= Hulme Hippodrome =

Theatre in Hulme, Manchester, England

Coordinates: 53.464321°N 2.249587°W

- Grand Junction Theatre; Second Manchester Repertory Theatre
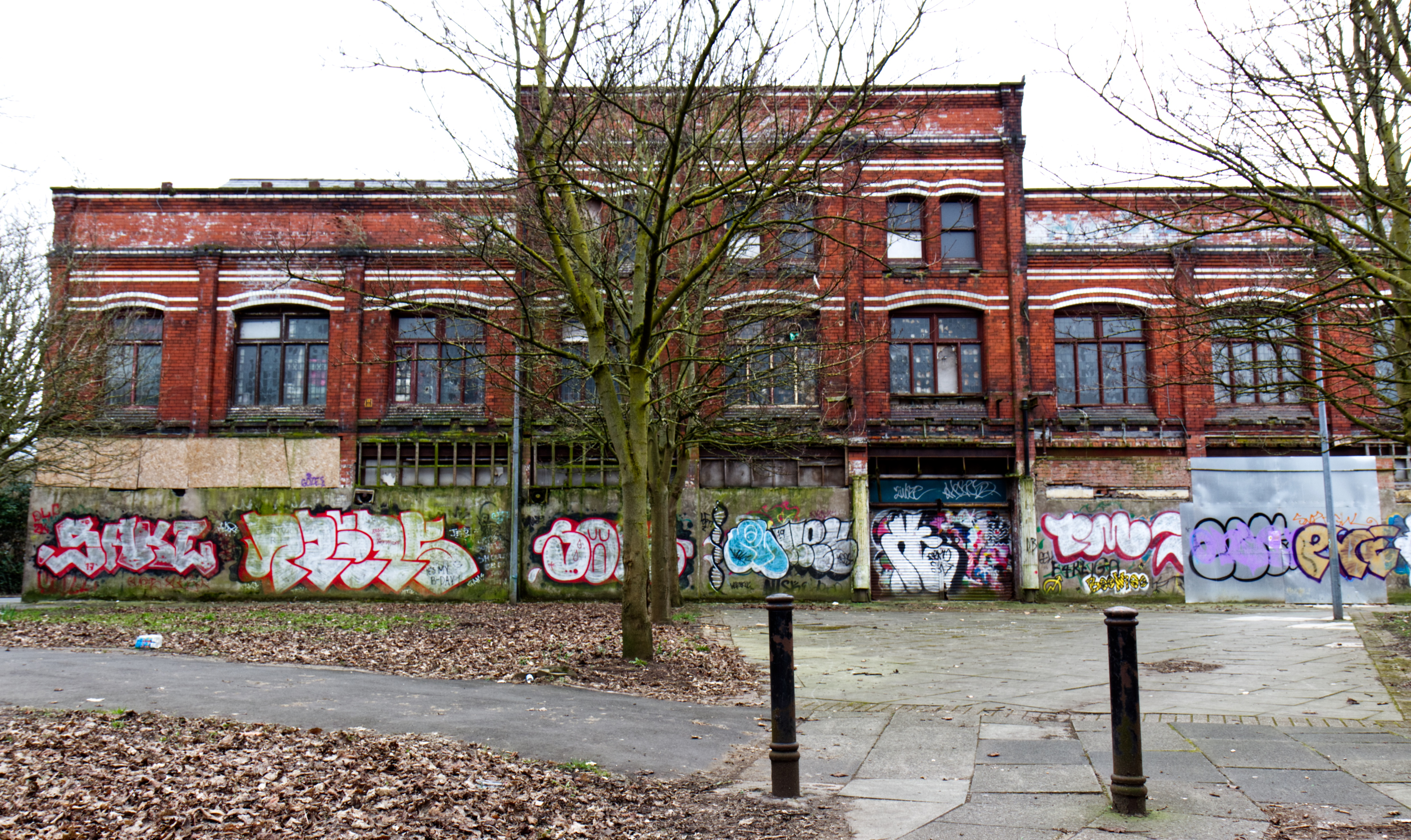
- Exterior of Hulme Hippodrome, 2021
- Address: Warwick Street, Hulme; Manchester M15 5EU; England

Construction
- Opened: 1901
- Demolished

Listed Building – Grade II
- Official name: Hulme Hippodrome
- Designated: 8 June 1977
- Reference no.: 1283070
- Architect: J. J. Alley

The Hulme Hippodrome in Manchester, England, is a shuttered Grade II listed building, a proscenium arch theatre with two galleries and a side hall. It was originally known as the Grand Junction Theatre and Floral Hall, and opened on 7 October 1901 on the former main road of Preston Street, Hulme, (now Clopton Walk) and with stage access is from Warwick Street. The Hulme Hippodrome theatre is located in the same building and shares a party wall with its small sibling theatre, The Playhouse. The Hippodrome was a music hall and variety theatre, a repertory theatre in the 1940s, and hired on Sundays for recording BBC programmes with live audiences between 1950 and 1956. In the 1960s and 1970s it was a bingo hall, and from 2003 used by a disgraced church. The theatre has been closed since 2018 and a campaign group exists to bring it back into use as a community resource, where the current owner is seeking permission to build apartments. Its local name in memoirs and records is 'Hulme Hipp'. Its national heritage significance includes being the venue for live recording the first three series of BBC programmes by the comedians Morecambe and Wise.

== Architectural details ==
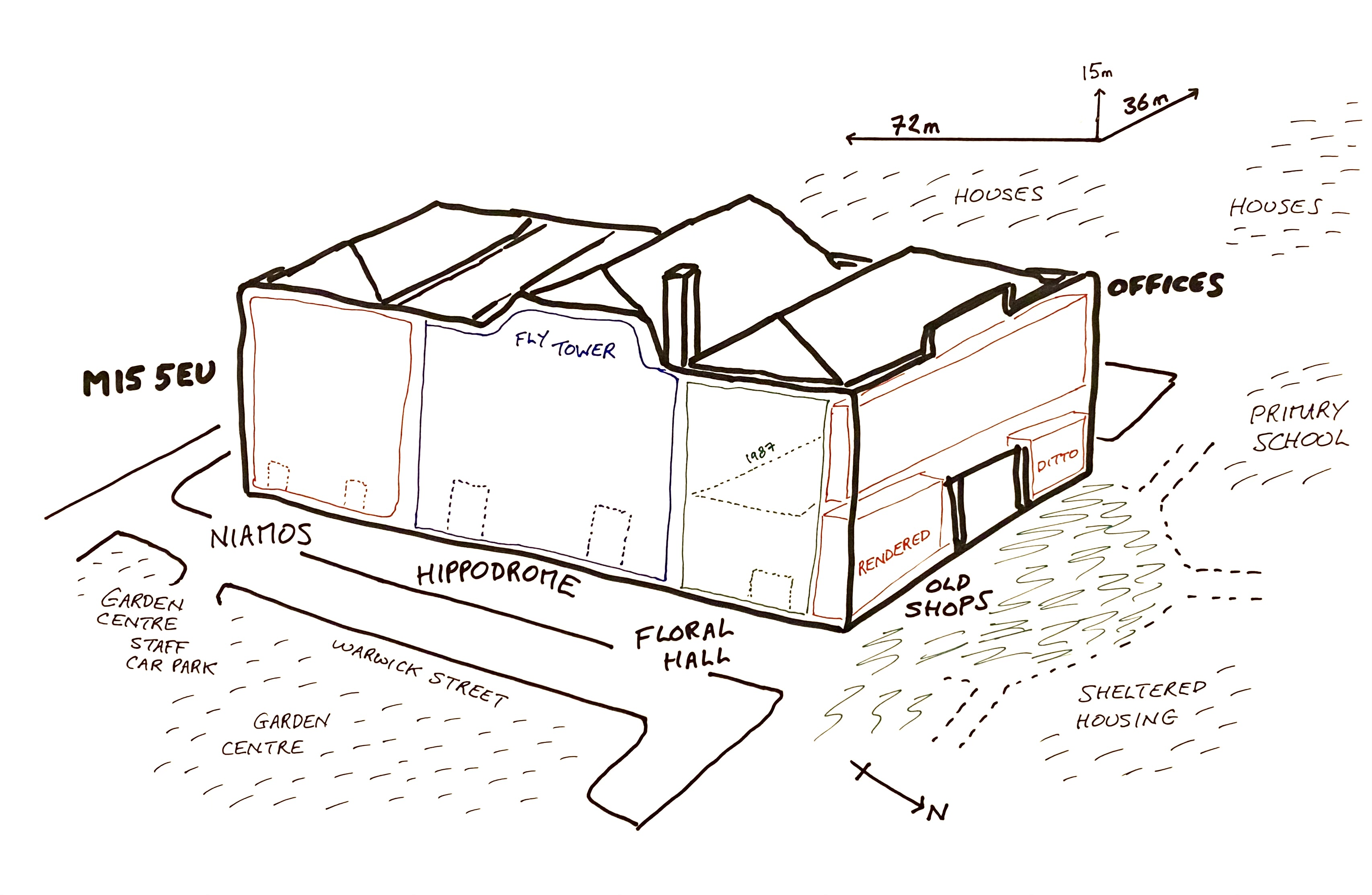
Sketch of entire building - both Hulme Hippodrome and Playhouse theatres

The Hippodrome and the conjoined smaller Playhouse Theatre in the same building were built at roughly the same time (1901, 1902) and they were part of the circuit of 17 theatres owned by William Henry Broadhead (1848-1931) located mostly in working class urban areas across North West England. The two venues were reportedly connected by an arcade (some researchers question this feature existed, but it has been confirmed in official files though small in scale). The extensive building was Broadhead's company headquarters. Various architectural drawings for the building exist in public archives, not all of which correspond with the eventual constructed form of the building. The architect was Joseph John Alley (1841–1912), however W.H. Broadhead had previously made his money as a builder and is suggested in research to have had a strong influence in the design and construction. The rectangular shape of the auditorium and the seating arranged in straight lines were distinctive to the Broadhead-built theatres. The frontage includes ornamentation with white glazed-brick bandings and pilaster strips, with (now faded) painted lettering. The motto of the Broadhead circuit was, "Quick, Clean, Smart and Bright".

=== Measurements and drawings ===
The property footprint is 1685 square metres (18,135 square feet, 0.4 acres); two and three storeys (15m height) plus a basement. The whole building footprint (both theatres) is 2506 square metres (26,975 square feet). The size of the building means that during heavy rain (8mm/hr) 20,000 litres of water (4,300 gallons) needs to be channelled and drained off the roof space per hour. The external ground measurements here are by wheel and by brick count for height. A recent and accurate 'measured survey' of the property is not known of, and permission to survey inside has been declined. Legacy drawings, often as part of an application pack for planning permission, are held in Manchester's public archives based in the Central Library, and a set showing floor plans, elevations and roof layout is available online.

=== Location, and 1960s area-wide demolitions and road changes ===
Since around 1965 onwards the Hippodrome has "lost its original relationship to the street network" because of the substantial 'slum' or area clearances in Hulme and across the inner city neighbourhoods of Manchester and Salford generally.

The Hulme Hippodrome frontage was originally on a main shopping street, Preston Street, and the theatre faced a T-junction being an imposing landmark at the end of Clopton Street, a main road that headed north towards the city centre (Ellis Street follows it part-way now). The theatre was served by trams and buses, including the 62 bus route from Heaton Park via Albert Square to Chorlton, and people from north Manchester would reportedly regularly attend the performances, including children from Prestwich travelling independently by this direct bus.

The roads were removed ('stopped up') in the problematic 1960s urban regeneration, around 1965. Clopton Street became Clopton Walk, a footpath going north towards the new Hulme Crescents. In the 1990s urban regeneration phase the Crescents were demolished and Clopton Walk was reduced in length. Outside the frontage of Hulme Hippodrome today are three footpaths and two cul-de-sacs that meet in a small semi-paved square, almost a courtyard, where Preston Street and Clopton Street were sited previously.

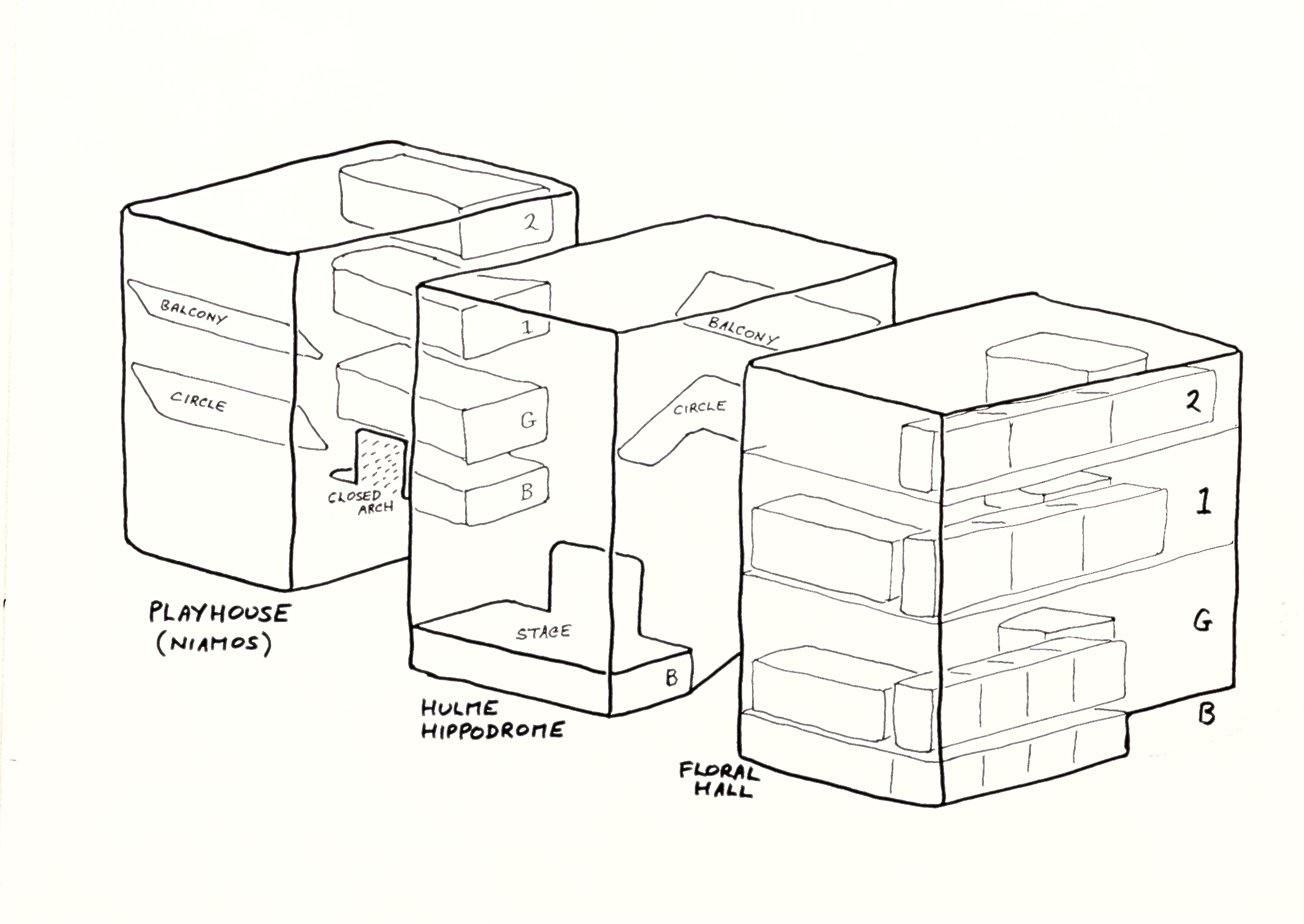
Sketch of the building's three interior sections.

Some of the older postcodes used for the building are no longer officially recognised, for example M15 5JJ, M15 5UP and M15 5FT.

=== Ease of 'get in' ===
In terms of its current relationship to the street network, the Hipp has theatre doors on a remaining eastern boundary cul-de-sac of Warwick Street, M15 5EU. The original tall stage doors, now partially bricked up, are an easy 'get in' and 'get out' for scenery because the pavement (sidewalk) was level with the stage. This meant that the raked seats in the stalls were at street level at the back (off Wilberforce Close) and slanted down to reach basement level at the front row (off Warwick Street).

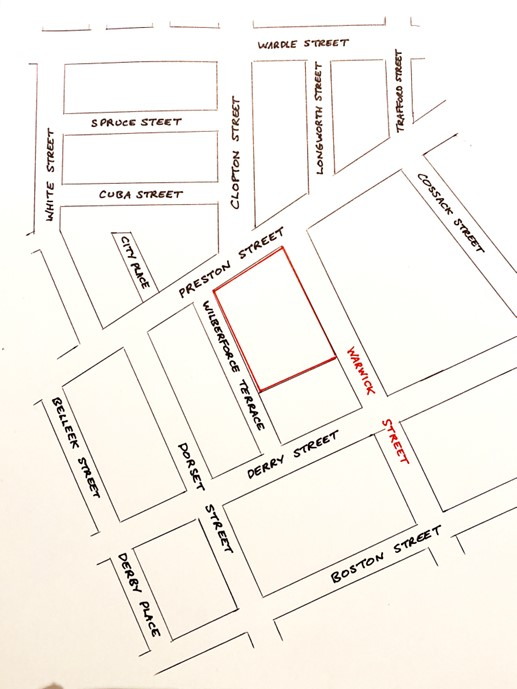
The streets around Hulme Hippodrome, up to 1950s

=== Stage and backstage ===
Without currently having access, written accounts of the stage dimensions vary slightly. In one account the stage depth is 10m, the width of the proscenium arch is 9m, and the fly tower/ fly loft / grid is 15m. In another account the same measurements would be 13.4m, 10m, 15.2m, and the stage width behind the arch would be 22m.

It is important to remember that WH Broadhead / JJ Alley designed the Hulme Hippodrome stage for drama, it was only five years later that it became used for variety shows. When WH Broadhead built the Royal Hippodrome in Preston a few years later (1905) as a variety theatre from the outset, the following points were made:

- "Although nothing was said at the time, the Broadhead policy was to get as many people into the building as possible and things were planned in such a way that, if entertainment did not prove profitable, there could be a fairly easy transfer to manufacture. The [Preston] stage suffered particularly. There were no flies [headroom above the stage to store backdrops etc] and there was a very steep rake [a steeply sloping stage] which, although it was helpful for one-man acts, was very demanding on those wanting to erect a stage set. Repertory companies were later to find this a real problem, as was the lack of any space for the painting of scenery."

Dressing rooms are located directly underneath the stage as a row of cubicle rooms with plumbing, with connecting stairs. Being used for use as a variety theatre or 'music hall' reportedly the stage wings are relatively shallow, and apparently with no scene dock for storage. Transfers between the stage sides were usually done behind the back cloth. There are reports of the stage floor being strengthened from below with steel props when heavy animals were to be included in the programme, and reports of ice shows where the water had to be rapidly frozen in situ on the Sunday for the week ahead.

From an illustrated article, the following captions to photographs add some useful details:

1. Only two rows of the dress circle are buried underneath the gallery overhang which is supported by pillars. The gallery front has a repetitive theme of musical instruments.
2. The [plasterwork] figure of Pan looks down from the upper corner of the proscenium arch. It looks as though he has heard a good joke from the stage.
3. This view from the corner of the gallery shows good sightlines. Some seats in various parts of the house would have had interference from pillars. Note the square proscenium (which matches the square auditorium).
4. The delicate Rococo plasterwork is shown to good effect. A short staircase gives access to the upper suite of open boxes. There are only open boxes as opposed to separate enclosed ones. (The interiors are very red simply because everything was red!)
5. Being intended for legitimate theatre, the house was equipped with a paint frame which was never taken out. Since the Playhouse next door appears never to have had one, it is possible that any cloths required were painted in the Hippodrome and transferred over.
6. The deep stage, intended for touring drama and musical productions, had over 60 lines which were tied off on cleats of an unusual shape. Note the platform on which the flymen stood to operate the lines.
7. In a shield high above the proscenium opening ... we can be seen the interwoven letters GJT which stood for Grand Junction Theatre. These were redundant when the theatre became the Hippodrome, and Mecca made further attempts to obliterate them with red paint.

=== Main auditorium ===
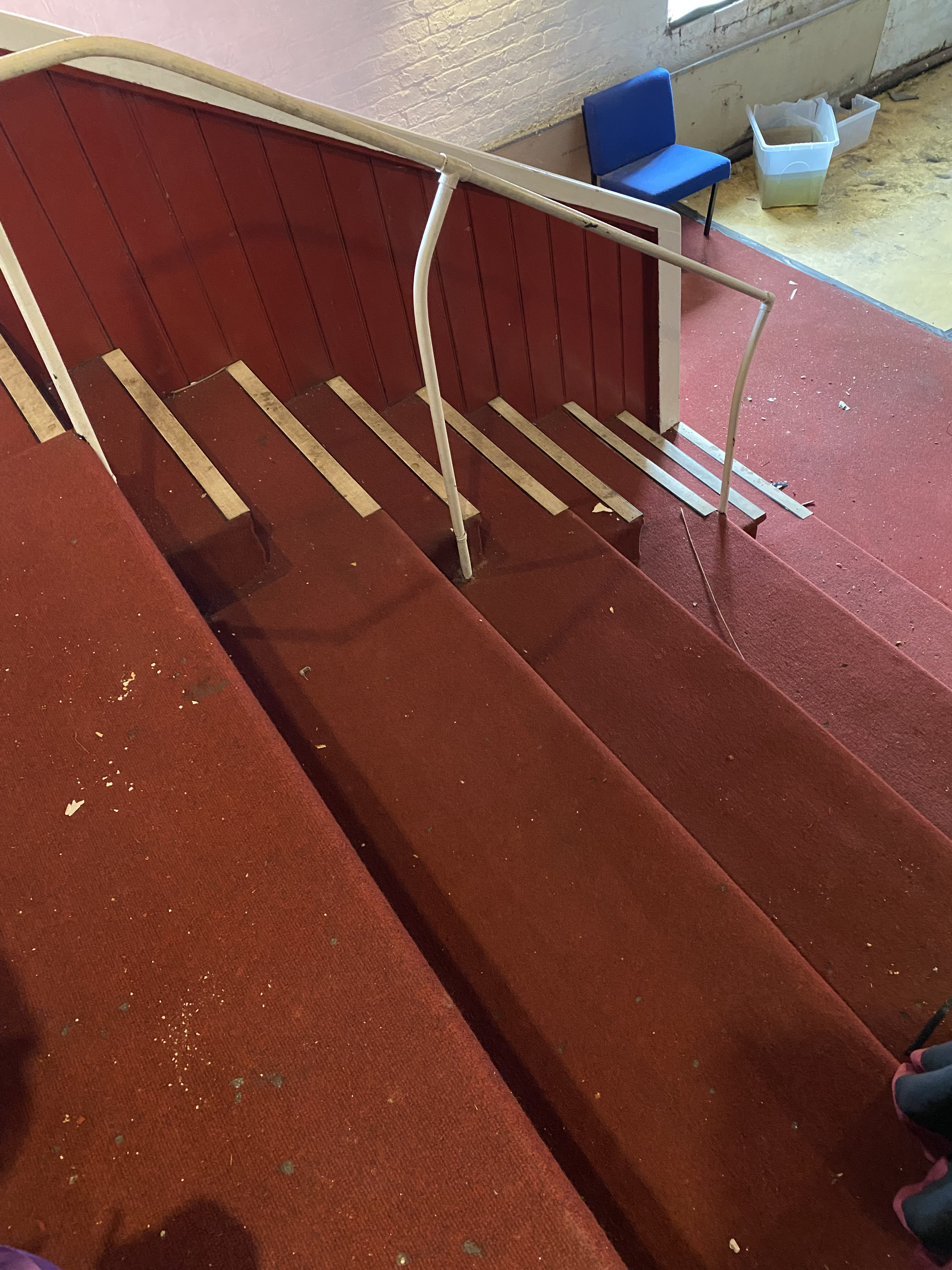
Original benches in the Upper Circle of The Playhouse (aka Niamos)

The main auditorium is a proscenium arch theatre with two galleries - named as the Circle (aka Grand Circle) and the Upper Circle (aka Balcony). The ground floor was divided by price, for example in 1944 advertised as Orchestra Stalls, Stalls, and Pit Stalls. (The ground floor of The Playhouse next door was divided as Stalls, and Pit.)

From posters, by the 1950s the original name of the Balcony had been changed to the Upper Circle, where the seats could not be pre-booked. The Balcony / Upper Circle contained the cheapest seats and its patrons had to use a separate entrance which led directly to a carpeted stairway up to the seats. People in the Balcony / Upper Circle could not circulate with other patrons, such as making use of the bar.

The ornate interior plasterwork was by Messrs Alberti, of Oxford Street, Manchester. The initial seating capacity was 3,300 (the most recent figures are 1,350 and 1,200) and unusually for a theatre the audience originally sat on straight benches, except for seven rows of individual tip-up seats in the centre block of the Circle. Benches were preferred by some theatre managers to squeeze in extra paying patrons for the popular shows. Gradually in later years more individual seats were installed in phases to replace the benches. The theatre's three-storey fly-tower is at the east side elevation next to Warwick Street with the backstage doors. Some additional doorways were reportedly added to this elevation around the 1960s to provide additional safety exits. This side also includes a square chimney with white glazed-brick decoration.

From a book listing details of English theatres, written largely in the late 1970s, where the Hipp was awarded 'three stars', the highest category used in this book:

- "A splendid music hall which has survived intact .... Built immediately alongside the Hulme Playhouse (1902). They share the same completely plain brick elevations, although the Hippodrome is at present swathed in [aluminium]-coated metal strip. It is an extraordinary experience to leave the world of concrete and tarmac, and to pass through this anonymous exterior into the riot of gilded Rococo plasterwork inside the magnificent auditorium (capacity approximately 1,200 by present standards). The basic design is very like the Playhouse next door, but apart from this and other, now demolished, theatres designed by Alley for the Broadhead circuit, the concept is quite unlike any other contemporary theatre or music hall. In the auditorium there are two balconies the upper one of eight straight rows spanning directly between the side walls, the lower one of nine straight rows in the centre, and side arms of four straight rows parallel with the side walls, diminishing to two. The ends are divided off to form a stage box on either side of the proscenium. Above each box is a further box, reached by a little staircase at the side of the balcony. The box and balcony fronts are very richly decorated with delicate Rococo plasterwork. The balconies are supported by iron columns with foliated capitals (some of them Gothic!). At the sides the columns are carried up from the balcony fronts to support the main ceiling which is coved and decorated with festoons at the sides and panelled in the centre. The proscenium ... is surprisingly formal, being flanked by giant fluted Ionic columns with an enriched straight entablature over, and a large central cartouche supported by putti."

A detail from a memoir of Mary Jordan, a woman who lived all her life in Hulme, notes that one of the exit routes from the Circle was by a ramp and not by stairs. This is confirmed by architectural drawings held in archives which show that the ramp was replaced by stairs in 1950.

- "One evening [my husband] Bill and I took our [son] Brian and my nephew Brian to the Hulme Hippodrome. How they enjoyed it! On coming out, my nephew Brian, running as usual, was in front of us. When you came out of the Hippodrome, you came down a long ramp to the street, made up from wooden boards which ran crosswise. Running down the slope, Brian gathered speed. Suddenly he decided to look back, probably to see where we were and in doing so he caught the toe of his shoe between the boards. Down he went, face first! By the time we had reached him somebody had already picked him up." This was around 1944.

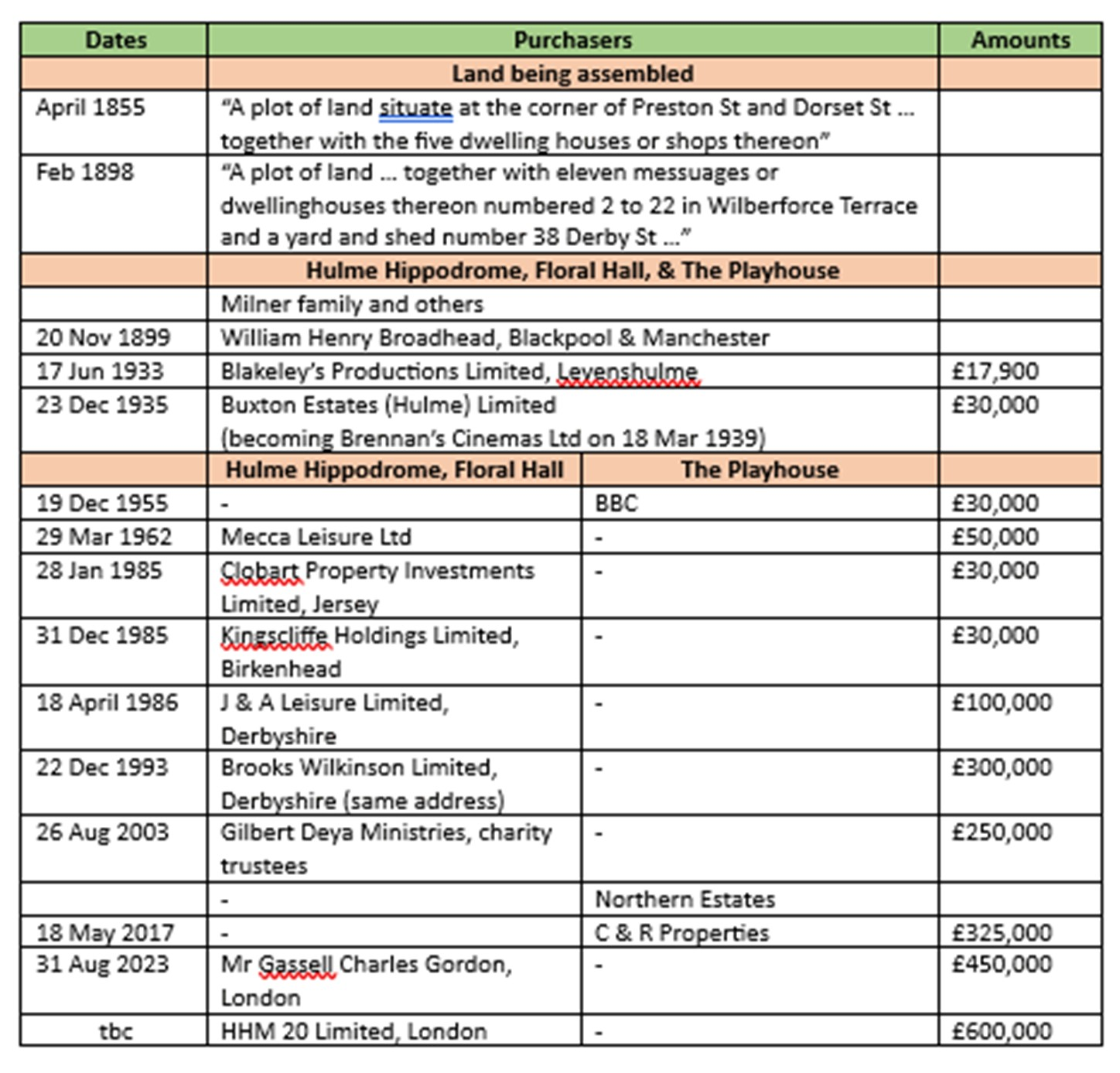
A table of ownership changes, dates and prices paid

=== A theatre with windows ===
One of the unusual features of Hulme Hippodrome was it was built with many windows facing Wilberforce Close, at the rear of the auditorium. These had internal shutters in a sliding sash arrangement to keep the auditorium dark during performances. Two reasons have been suggested for this unusual feature: during the cleaning of the auditorium during the day the owners could save money on gas lighting; and that if the theatre didn't work financially it would be easy to reuse the building as a factory or warehouse with a full number of windows.

=== Floral Hall, as modified ===
The Floral Hall was originally a full-height Edwardian atrium or conservatory with a glass apex roof for patrons to promenade indoors while waiting for the auditorium doors to open. The "early doors" system allowed patrons who paid an extra amount, advertised as a booked seat, to enter the building first and congregate, thus having access to the better seats before the standard-price patrons were admitted behind them. Initially while patrons waited in the Floral Hall there was a fish pond and an aviary (bird cage) to look at, according to architectural drawings in archives. There was also a bike storage area within the hall space.

In some research the design of this hall is described as "a rare failure" in the skills of W.H. Broadhead, leading to its re-design c. 1906:

- "One of Broadhead's greatest strengths was ... [his] perception that allowed him to make alterations to his houses if they were not as successful as planned. Nowhere was this demonstrated more thoroughly than in Hulme, when ... the Grand Junction closed its doors and began the transformation into the Hippodrome. The modifications were structural as well as nominal. In the new Hippodrome, a pass door remained at circle level to the now smaller Grand Junction, which enabled the waiting rooms created from the re-fashioning of the Floral Hall (a rare failure) to be accessible to all patrons. The remainder of this space was made into the main offices and garaging for the growing circuit."

Over the later years the atrium has been extensively modified, including division at first floor height with an additional floor and ceiling below, but with its original 1901 features reportedly retained behind the later fixtures. There were between one and three dates (1960s to 1987) for such first-floor conversions, as follows:

1. Maybe firstly in the 1960s, because architectural drawings exist in archives showing designs for a sweeping staircase up to a first floor unenclosed mezzanine-style area.
2. Maybe in December 1977 because a Listed Building Consent was granted for "internal alterations to social club", though this could have just related to the ground floor.
3. With more specific details in February 1987 a Listed Building Consent was granted for "alterations to form new lounge and 1st floor billiard / snooker room".

The glass apex roofing was replaced with corrugated sheets, reportedly metal, and this would have been done prior to June 1977 as no Listed Building Consent is on record.

From a book with listing details of English theatres, possibly compiled largely in the late 1970s, the details given are of an: "Unusually spacious foyer with delicate cast iron fretted balcony around four sides, the whole giving the effect of a mid-19th century concert room."

The Floral Hall could also be used as a waiting area for patrons of the Grand Junction / Playhouse, as follows: "In the new Hippodrome, a pass door remained at circle level to the now smaller Grand Junction, which enabled the waiting rooms created from the re-fashioning of the Floral Hall ... to be accessible to all patrons."

As well as bands performing on the main stage up to 1960, from details below it seems the Floral Hall (probably the ground floor function room) was later used for local music gigs in three phases: 1987-88; 2012–14; and 2017–18.

=== Frontage and shops ===
From archived plans, the original frontage was mostly shops with a small area to the north-west corner having an entrance to the theatre and a box office window to the street. In later years a shop in the central area was removed to create a more prominent theatre entrance. The four (possibly five, or six according to one drawing) small shops on Preston Street, odd numbers 47 to 53, were along the front of the building up to the north-east corner. Each shop unit had their own stairway to a self-contained basement. Known uses from oral histories and photographs include a shoe repairer, a hairdresser, and a tobacconist. The shop frontages were rendered over in 1971 and the units were reconfigured for use as storage areas with access via internal doorways.

A mercury arc rectifier made by Slatter & Co of London survives in the basement. These were typically used in commercial buildings that originally had a supply of DC (direct current) electricity to their plant equipment, so that when the local mains supply was converted to AC (alternating current) people could continue to use their older DC equipment. It was cheaper to buy a rectifier than to replace the DC plant equipment. The switch from DC to AC mains was mostly in the early 1900s. An alternative and more likely explanation for the existence of the rectifier is that it was needed to maintain the charge of the (DC) batteries in the fire system from the (AC) mains.

=== An arcade, canopy or veranda, 1901 ===
One of the changes of ownership was on 19 December 1955 and the Schedule to a title conveyance document held in the HM Land Registry files notes: "13 November 1901, Agreement (re column and portion of verandah)" and "30 November 1901 Agreement (re verandah)". Further details in a title document from 1933 are: "Agreement relating to an annual acknowledgement of £5 12s 6d for Verandahs in Warwick Street and Derby Street [later, Derry Street, now Chichester Road], Town Hall Manchester, 19 October 1926". There were also payments of 2s 6d for "Verandah and Column" and £1 1s 0d for "two electric signs", all same date. These side and end verandas are not seen in photographs from the late 1950s onwards, and it is possible they were removed during the early 1940s as part of the government's campaign to remove outdoor metalwork such as park railings for melting down to make wartime armaments.

=== Services and utilities ===
The heating system was a coal-fired boiler and brick chimney feeding hot water radiators, where the metal pipes were reportedly 10 cm (four inches) in diameter; and the emergency lights were powered by a bank of batteries running at 48 volts. When the two theatres separated legally in 1955 with the BBC purchase of The Playhouse, the deeds required the adjacent Hipp owners to continue to provide hot water for their radiators from October to May each year. There are one or more waste water pumps in the basement to feed the waste into sub-pavement sewers.

=== Early public transport ===
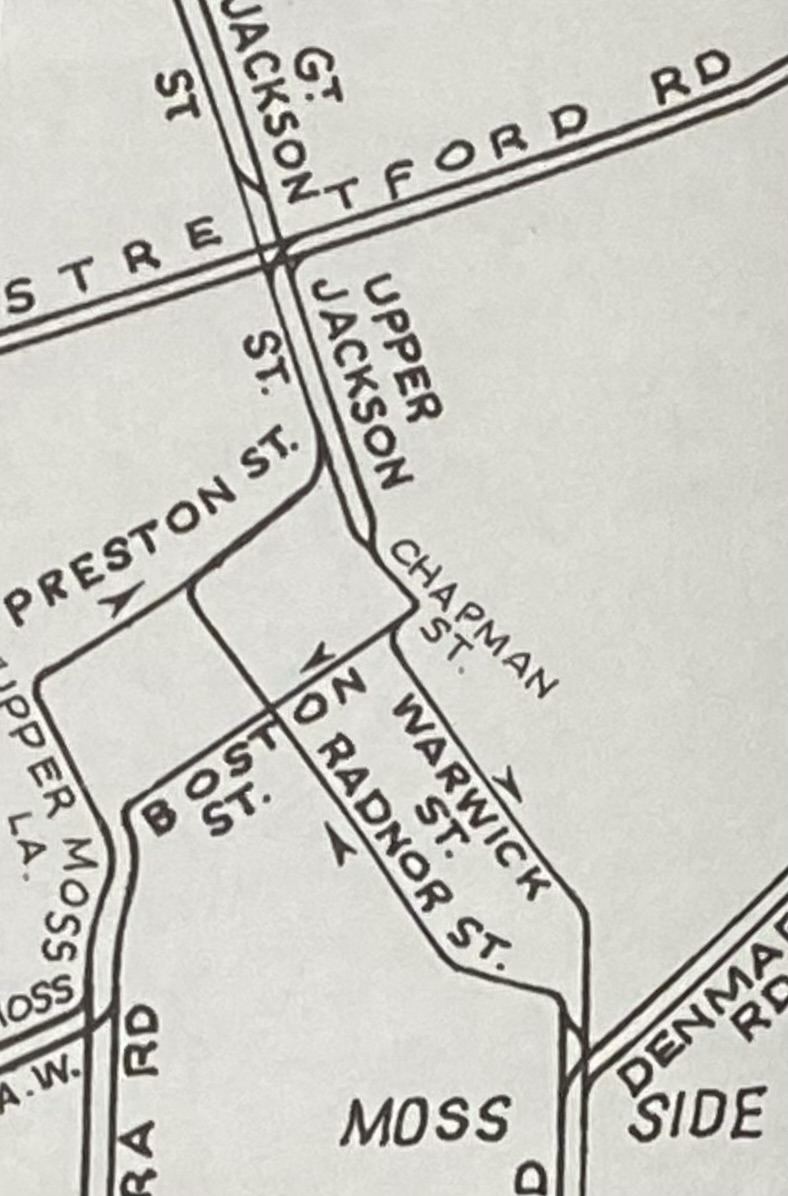
Trams outside the Hipp c.1900s to c.1930s

As late as winter 1905, horse-drawn buses still ran on the route between Chorlton-cum-Hardy and Hulme. These 'horse-drawn buses' used metal tracks set into the road. By replacing horses with overhead wire electrification, trams on rails on Manchester roads were first introduced in June 1901. The network peaked in 1928 and electric tram routes were gradually replaced by buses and trolley-buses.

The last tram routes ended in 1949 after a pause in decline during the war years. The map shown here indicates how trams ran one-way on Preston Street outside the Hippodrome, reportedly because the road wasn't wide enough for trams in both directions. An alternative explanation is that the tracks were placed in the centre of each road in a third, segregated lane to reduce delays from congestion around the shops. The Junction Pub / Hotel took its name from the junction where the tram lines split apart using parallel roads.

=== Refurbishments ===
From research to date including from plans sent to Manchester Council for approval and now held in their archive, the main refurbishments of the complex building appear to be as follows:

REFURBISHMENTS TIMELINE
Year	Summary	Capacity
1901	When first opened it was almost entirely with benches for seating, except right at the front of the ground floor. The (ground floor) Stalls seating was divided - the first five rows were the more expensive Orchestra Stalls, with a gated and staffed barrier separating them from the main Stalls seating behind them (1,500 seats according to a newspaper article on its opening week). Separate street entrances were used by these two groups. Some reports suggest that individual seats were also at the front of the Circle.	3,300
1906	Some of the benches in the Stalls were changed to individual seats at the time of the name swap, Floral Hall was "refashioned".	
1913	The last of the benches in the Stalls were changed to seats.	
1935	First bar was installed, on first floor, reportedly with two doorways to serve both auditoriums by using different interval timings.	
1940	The layout of the seats in the Stalls changed from straight lines to fan-shape; all benches in the Circle changed to seats, decorating, carpeting, new lights.	1,750
1950	The exit to street from the Circle changed from a ramped corridor to stepped corridor. [ All benches in the Upper Circle (aka Balcony, Galley) remain in situ. ]	1,530
1953	Fireproof corridor added to basement dressing rooms, new second exit added from stage to Warwick Street	
1955	Openings in the internal party wall were bricked up when The Playhouse was sold to the BBC to be used as a permanent studio.	
1962	Refit by Mecca for their use as a bingo hall; auditorium mostly left intact with Stalls seating removed and stage area has temporary wooden partitions.	
c. 1970s	Shop fronts are rendered over and repurposed as bingo storage rooms, and the glass apex roof to the Floral Hall is replaced with corrugated sheeting, probably asbestos cement.	
1977	The property is heritage listed as Grade II. Listed Building Consent is granted for internal alterations to the social club ("cabaret lounge") in the Floral Hall space, possibly including a "false wall" as reported by a subsequent owner.	
1982	A further refit by Mecca to the Floral Hall (the ground floor, effectively) with a cabaret bar and a mirror bar.	
1987	Floral Hall is further changed - being divided vertically with a new concrete first floor inserted, costing £120,000 for a lounge area downstairs with a kitchen "at the back" and the false wall removed; creating a new upstairs billiard / snooker room with 12 tables.	
2004	Two telecom antennas disguised as flagpoles are fixed to the building.	
2007	The external metal cladding is removed by Manchester City Council as dangerous.	
2009	The canopy and loose glass from high level windows are removed by Manchester City Council as dangerous.	

== Opening week ==
The following press article appeared at the end of the opening week:

- "The Grand Junction Theatre, the third of the district theatres which Messrs. Broadhead and Sons have provided for Manchester, was opened on Monday evening [7 October] in the presence of a crowded house. Placed in Preston-street, at a point about midway between Upper Jackson-street and Moss Lane, the new public place of entertainment will cater for the support of people not only in the crowded district of Hulme, but of the adjoining suburbs of Moss Side and Old Trafford. In form and size the interior of the building resembles the Queen's Theatre in Bridge-street, with the difference that the gallery is set back from the dress circle and does not overshadow it. Sitting accommodation is provided for 3,300 persons, the number assigned to the pit being no fewer than fifteen hundred. Not the least acceptable feature of the theatre is that a good view of the stage can be obtained from any part of it, and there is a general sense of comfort and space. Under the numerous electric lights the dress of cream and gold has a bright and attractive appearance, the warm colours of the curtain affording a grateful contrast. The Floral Hall, a spacious smoking lounge leading into the house, is a novel and welcome feature of theatrical architecture, and judging from Monday's experience extensive use will be made of it by the audience between the acts. These are the days of teetotal theatres in Manchester, and in the absence of the liquor licence persons who desire something stronger than tea, coffee, or ginger beer will have to go for it to the nearest public-house. As to the dramatic and musical fare it is similar to that provided at Messrs. Broadhead's other theatres, the Osborne and Metropole, and this week The Favourite, a sensational racing drama with real racehorses, furnishes the program, being interpreted by the author (Mr. Frank Adairs) and his company. This is to be followed on Monday by For the King, an historical play."

Manchester City News, Saturday 12 October 1901, p3

== c. 1906 name swap – Variety starts ==
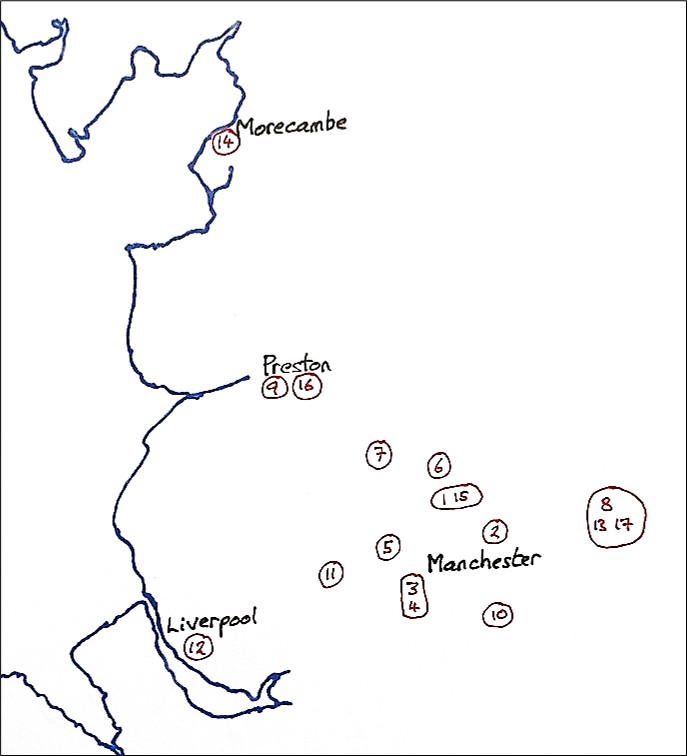
Map of Circuit of 17 Broadhead theatres across North West England, 1896-1931

Initially the larger of the two conjoined theatres staged mainly dramatic productions, while the smaller theatre presented variety performances, but due to the increasing popularity of variety theatre the names and functions of the two adjacent theatres were swapped over in 1906 or 1907: the formerly-named Hippodrome became known as the Grand Junction, and the variety performances and name were transferred to the larger theatre, now the new Hippodrome. The swap also replaced some benches in the Pit and Stalls areas with individual tip-up seats, the most expensive seats, prices ranging from tuppence (1p) to nine pence (4p). While some research states that the swap took place in 1905, a newspaper advertisement from June 1906 shows the original arrangement was still in place then, and an archived oral history interview with Bert Briggs states the swap took place in "1906-07".

The roots of variety theatre in the UK have been said in some research to be found in the vaudeville format that came from the USA. It extended the previous UK format of music halls, with the audience previously sat around tables with food and drink. Many researchers use 'music hall' in a broader way without the old seating format being the deciding factor, and this includes writings on the origins and early years of Hulme Hippodrome.

=== Overcrowding ===
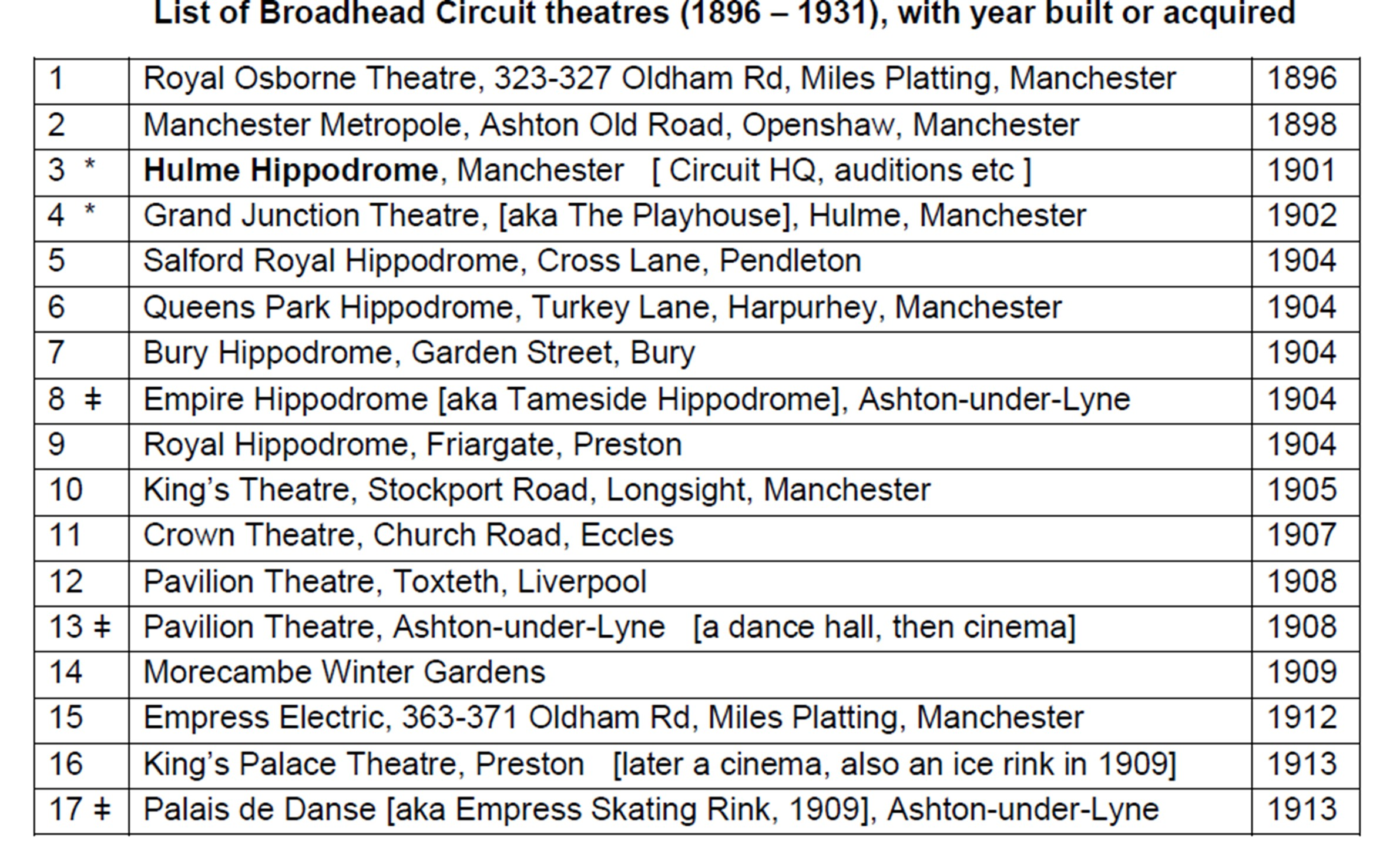
List of Broadhead Circuit theatres, 1896-1931

From a press report, on 20 February 1908 the Watch Committee of Manchester Corporation met in the Lord Mayor's Parlour in Manchester Town Hall in public to approve theatre licences and to hear complaints about overcrowding in theatres. WH Broadhead was in attendance asking for a licence concession to sell alcohol at Hulme Hippodrome and his other theatres. The packed public attendance had raised petitions and were complaining strongly about 'the queueing system' and instead they wanted 'the booking system'. One theatre (Prince's Theatre, Manchester) had 700 people reported as standing in the Pit area at times, along with blocked exit routes. The queueing system included what was known at the time as the "early doors" process which gave people a choice of the better seats in return for both paying higher prices and arriving early, and "late doors" referred to the cheaper prices for people who were let in later to take the remainder of the seats. However, people who had paid the early doors prices were complaining about having to wait for hours in bad weather and shopkeepers were complaining about so many people blocking 'their' pavements. For example, at the meeting "A young lady said she waited outside the [Prince's] theatre one evening for an hour and a quarter, paid a shilling, and then found there was no room." The theatre owners present at the meeting successfully resisted a change to having to adopt the booking system, but in return the committee's decision was that for "the music-halls, the Broadhead theatres, and the Gaiety Theatre the Committee again exacted a covenant from the [licence] applicants that they would not sell intoxicating liquors." This ban on alcohol sales remained until February 1935.

A memoir of a childhood in a nearby "slum" in inner Salford described the crowding and the associated use of benches in a similar venue:

- "Owner-managers of slum cinemas, out for every penny they could get, crushed their youngest patrons so rightly along the cheap benches that no child dared even get up for fear of losing his seat. In our establishment, even before the lights went out, retaining position could be difficult. Theoretically, no standing was allowed. The chucker-out would bring a small paying customer to an already packed bench, push his posterior against the end occupant and make room for the newcomer; but this sent pressure running along the row, and another child slid off the other end."

=== A 'number two' venue ===
Variety theatres in Britain were divided into a hierarchy of three national networks with the top being called 'number one'. This hierarchy collapsed in the mid-1950s "with remarkable speed." Artists were paid the most by number one venues, such as on the Moss Empires Theatres circuit, and once they started to get such bookings they would refuse booking requests from venues lower in the hierarchy. Number one venues were mostly in the West End theatre district in London and in some other city centres. Examples of a number one venue were the (First) Manchester Hippodrome on Oxford Road, and the Ardwick Empire (later the New Manchester Hippodrome) in Ardwick Green. Hulme Hippodrome was a number two venue (based on recollections of older people from Hulme who visited as children, knowing it was called a "second grade" variety theatre; and press comments).

Number three venues tended to be local independents or in the smaller circuits. Number one venues had larger orchestras, and with a wider range of musicians. A benefit of being designated as a lower number venue was that their audiences would often be the first to see new artists. Having all three types of 'number' theatres nearby added to the range of acts available to local communities, like having a choice of different TV channels. Audiences could also be set in their ways. In 1947 the Bristol Empire theatre, noted as a 'number two' theatre for its variety and revue shows, ran an experiment of showing eight plays. However the chronicler of the theatre reported that the working-class audiences stayed away and the middle-class audiences wouldn't come away from 'their' own theatres.

=== Variety era, Black artists at the Hipp ===
Research has been done into some of the notable black performers who appeared at Hulme Hippodrome in the variety era, including Harry Scott and Eddie Whaley, Cassie Walmer, Will Garland, Chris Gill, and Ike Hatch.

In June 1911 the following press preview was given:

- "A strong variety programme will be presented at the Hulme Hippodrome, the artists including Scott and Whaley, eccentric coloured comedians, the Hadji Mohammed [Arabian] Troupe of acrobats, and Jack Stephens and Company in a farcical skit entitled Shooting."

In June 1915 Will Garland, a Black American entertainer and later a producer, is mentioned in a press review:

- "There is a particularly strong company at the Hulme Hippodrome. King and Bennon lead the way with their well-known Messenger Boy and 'Some' Girl business. Will Garland's troupe of dancing entertainers are very amusing, and Olivia Madison gives clever impressions."

Will Garland was at Hulme Hippodrome again in March 1917 in Coloured Society.

=== Early artists and events at the Hipp ===
In November 1906 Hulme Hippodrome was a venue for a wrestling match, and a press report indicates the disorder that followed:

- Last night J Carroll, the British champion light-weight wrestler, met the German champion Peter Gotz, who offered £25 to any Englishman who was not thrown in thirty minutes. The scene was the Hulme Hippodrome, which was crowded. The conditions included the offer that if a throw were obtained against the German the money would be paid over. The contestants were on the mat for 22 minutes. The Englishman after three minutes had Gotz in difficulties, and almost gained the victory. The German recovered, and it was a hard and earnest struggle to the end, which was not at all satisfactory to the audience. Carroll was several times near throwing his opponent. Suddenly Gotz, with a leg hold, summersaulted Carroll, who appeared to fall on his side. The referee ruled otherwise, and the audience rose against the decision. An explanation was impossible in the noise, and the curtain was rung down.

In the week 15 to 20 February 1909 Harry Houdini performed at Hulme Hippodrome. From images of a publicity bill, during the "second house" on 17 February 1909 he was challenged to escape from a bespoke restraint made locally by Harry Foster, a saddler based at 4 Upper Jackson Street, Hulme - "horses carefully measured and neatly fitted". There are similar mutual-publicity examples from his performances in other areas.

Around 1910 it's reported that Stan Laurel appeared at the Hipp as a young man before going to America. His stage name at a young age was Stanley Jefferson, being a member of the Fred Karno troupe and reportedly making his professional debut in Manchester. He was on stage with Frank Lisbon and understudying Charlie Chaplin. In 1912 Stan Laurel moved to the USA as part of the Fred Karno company.

In 1915 Gracie Fields led in a variety revue called, Yes, I Think So, which premiered on the Broadhead circuit of theatres which included Hulme Hippodrome. She appeared also as a solo act in the last week of March 1915. The Tiller Girls dance company (formed in Manchester in 1889) performed at the Hulme Hippodrome (1912) as did Randolf Sutton (1930).

From May 1915 the following performance was reviewed:

- I've Seen the 'Arem is a burlesque of high quality, and at the Hulme Hippodrome it quickly finds favour. The fun is fast and furious, and the singing and dancing are also splendid. Dan Clark and Tommy Mostol and Jimmy Kurry are the principals. The Flying W.... [indistinct] in a comedy ariel act, and Warner, a dancing violinist, are also on the bill.

George Formby appeared at the Hulme Hippodrome between 1923 and 1935, including in his own revue, Formby Seeing Life (1925) which was described in The Manchester Programme as "a distinct success. He works hard, and as the simple looking lad from Wigan gets the better of most arguments."

Reportedly Max Miller played at the Hipp in February 1927 in a Fred Karno production, The Show. He appeared again alongside Ken Dodd in the 1950s, detailed below.

=== 1921 - Census details ===
The 1921 census was the first survey to record every person's place of work. These records are now public-domain under the 100-year rule. A search of this online database has shown 133 people as "employed by WH Broadhead", and nine people, mostly-different, when the search for the employer is worded as "Hulme Hippodrome", as shown in the table below. Performers may have listed their agent as the employer, rather than their venue on census day.

Name		Age	Home	Job title
James	Bell	42	Beswick	Operative House & Ship Painter & Decorator
Sidney	Haslan	39	Bradford (Mcr)	Stage Manager
Raymond	Furniss	54	Bury	Manager
JH	Morris	50	Chorlton	Electrical Engineer
Silvester	Smith	62	Hulme	Mechanical Engineer
Sidney	Willdig	15	Hulme	Errand Boy
John	Blagbrough	43	Moss Side	Theatrical Secretary
Ernest	Winstanley	48	Openshaw	House and Decorative Painter
William H	Isherwood	41	Winton	Theatrical Secretary

=== 1933 – new owner, Blakeley's Productions Ltd ===
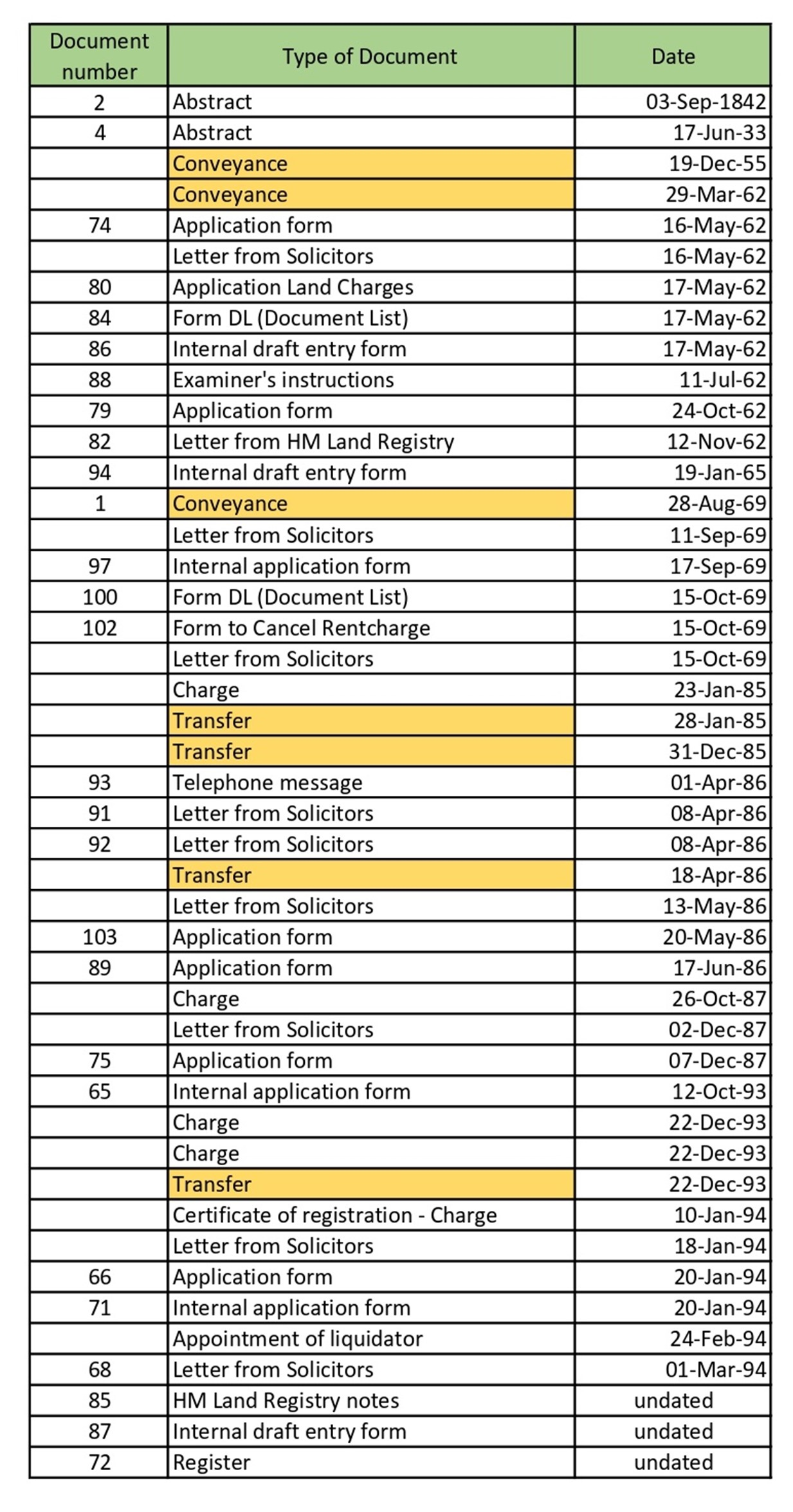
Hulme Hippodrome - Land Registry paper documents

Following the death of WH Broadhead in 1931 the theatre was sold to Blakeley's Productions Limited (aka Mancunian Films) on 17 June 1933 for £17,900, reportedly to help the family pay death duties. There is no evidence that the Hipp was used as a film studio at this time, it is the early stages in the work of the company, and it was sold on after two and a half years. This might be a time when the Hipp was used to show the new 'talkie' films instead or as well as variety shows being performed on stage. Apparently the Hipp became part of the Barrasford Circuit around 1933.

=== 1935 – first drinks bar ===
In February 1935 the Manchester Watch Committee permitted Hulme Hippodrome and a number of other local theatres to sell alcohol for the first time, limited to sales during one 15-minute intermission in each performance. Previously any theatre in Manchester with two shows each evening was not allowed to sell alcohol.

From architectural drawings, plans, held at HM Land Registry dated September 1955, they show a 'Mirror Bar' within the Hipp footprint which was used by Playhouse Circle patrons. Access was through entering double doors into an Ante Room which was above the exit corridor from the Hipp Balcony to Warwick Street, and turning left and up a few steps to enter the Mirror Bar. Some of these 1955 partitions in the plans may have been new, prompted by the legal separation of The Playhouse (sold to the BBC) from the Hipp.

From research interviews relating to the 1980s the bar was reportedly at the back of the Circle inside the Hippodrome auditorium, with a set of lockable double doors and privacy curtains at each end which allowed patrons to enter at different times from both The Playhouse and from the Hippodrome by having the intervals with staggered timings.

=== 1935 – new owner, Buxton Estates / Brennan's Cinemas Ltd ===
On 23 December 1935 the Hipp was sold to Buxton Estates (Hulme) Limited for £30,000. On 18 March 1939 the company name was changed to Brennan's Cinemas Ltd, known as the 'Brennan Circuit', although the lease to J & C Lever Theatre ran on to June 1940. A grandson of WH Broadhead, Alfred Burt-Briggs (1912-2004), wrote an unpublished memoir of the Broadhead Circuit and kept a family archive of papers relating to the 17 theatres.

From an account of variety theatre work, in the 1930s the Floral Hall next to the Hipp was used during the daytime for rehearsals and auditions, as described here:

- "If it was the Manchester area, the pantomime would probably be assembled and rehearsed in studios attached to the Hulme Hippodrome, where auditions would be held for extra parts and [speciality] acts. The pantomime might begin at the Hulme Hippodrome, before taking in the Salford Royal Hippodrome, the Liverpool Pavilion, and a couple more. Finally Wal [Butler, comedian and producer] and his stars, 'with an all star cast including your repertory favourites' would bring the show off the road at the end of the last week in January, before the theatres returned to their normal repertory."

From a newspaper report in 1933, Hulme Hippodrome and other theatres in Manchester had been closed for a "summer vacation" and would reopen on the Bank Holiday at the end of August. This was probably a regular arrangement each year.

In August 1934 the theatre management (GH Barrasford) published a celebratory advertisement in The Stage about the popularity of the play of the novel Love on the Dole by Walter Greenwood (1933), saying, "Last week at the Hippodrome, Hulme (the seventh week it has played Manchester this year) ... Total receipts £915-1-6". Wendy Hiller was the lead actor in this performance, it having transferred from the Prince's Theatre in Manchester. The play was first performed on 26 February 1934 by the Manchester Repertory Theatre company at their theatre in Rusholme, Manchester.

=== Plays and Variety ===
In February 1937 a further Walter Greenwood play was performed at the Hipp, Give Us This Day, based on his novel His Worship the Mayor. The play has previously been called, Special Area.

In his memoir, Randle Cutts could remember from his childhood seeing billboards for Duggie Wakefield, Billy Nelson, Chuck O'Neil and Jack Butler as a comedy troupe called The Boys from Manchester appearing at the Hipp.

An extensive coverage of the variety acts performing at Hulme Hippodrome between 1920 and 1940 was compiled by Roger Rolls and self-published as a book in 2000. His father was on the staff at the Hulme Hippodrome playing the violin in the resident 'orchestra', having learnt to play to regain work after being gassed in the First World War.

In 2016 Cicely Peover, 90, wrote about her memories of 'Hulme Hipp' from the 1930s when as a child where she would go to the:

- "first house on a Saturday night. Always in the circle ... my sister and I were with grandpa who loved 'variety' and brought a quarter of jellied almonds to eat during the show. Jugglers, acrobats, dancers, singers, the wonderfully funny Albert Modley, seals who played motor horns and even a circus. The aroma on that occasion was rather more pungent than the usual cosy, plushy theatre smell! Boxing Day would mean the annual panto when Eileen and I could wear a new 'best' winter dress." (A "quarter" was a quarter of a pound in weight, just over 100g)

== 1940s – (second) Manchester Repertory Theatre ==
On 8 July 1940 the theatre re-opened "after extensive decorating, re-seating, carpeting, re-lighting (stage and auditorium)" and being "under new management from 24 June 1940" according to a trade advertisement. The new owner was Hulme Hippodrome Ltd, with Mr WJ Boyle as managing director and Mr T Rawlinson as chairman. The refurbishment changed the seating capacity to 1,750 people, and it included spending "a large sum of money in modernising it. There is a complete and new system of stage lighting (Strand Electric), new draperies, etc." (from correspondence dated 21 January 1941).

However six months after their purchase the Hulme Hipp it closed on Saturday 18 January 1941, thus:

- "We have been compelled to close this theatre because of the serious effect the enemy action on Manchester has had upon business." (from correspondence dated 21 January 1941).

At some point after January 1941 the Hipp reopened, probably between 1942 and 1949, the productions were staged by the Manchester Repertory Theatre.

From a memoir including childhood in the war years,

- "For a time at the beginning of the war the performance times were staggered but this quickly gave way to normal times twice nightly. At Christmas and for the next month there was the usual Fortescue pantomimes mostly comprised of ... the normal repertory acting company. ... Immediately prior to the pantomime the company would probably perform a week of children's plays adapted from children's classics by a cast member. The pattern continued throughout the war but as things settled down the pantomimes became more variety orientated again. ... [During the war] Tin helmets and gas masks were carried and worn by Front of House personnel. The St Johns Ambulance Brigade attended every performance and if an air raid started, audiences could take shelter in the indicated street air raid shelter, though few seldom did and the performance continued as normally as possible to the accompaniment of the drone of bombers, bombs and anti-aircraft fire. Artistes and Front of House staff alike were obliged to do fire watching duty in the fire watching towers built on the roofs of the theatres, and had to extinguish incendiary bombs."

One press report partially dates this period by saying, "For a few years after the war it was a repertory theatre but it reverted to variety and revue", however the name had been used "as an alternative title since 1943" and then permanently from July 1946. The company advertised themselves as the Manchester Repertory Theatre, but sometimes "Second" was later added to the name to differentiate them from an earlier rep company active from 1907 to c. 1917. One example in September 1942 was their production of the play Double Door, originally from the US in 1933.

=== Frank H. Fortescue Players / Companies ===
There were at least two 'war plays' written by Zelda Davees, a local resident and a former rep actor: Wearing the Pants (1941); and Without Them We Perish (1944) based on the Manchester air raid and performed by the Frank H Fortescue's Famous Players. According to IMDb the play Wearing the Pants became a screenplay for the film Those People Next Door (1953). It was made by Mancunian Films in Rusholme at the film studios on Dickenson Road, later bought by the BBC in 1954 for TV productions.

Other Manchester Repertory Theatre advertised performances at Hulme Hippodrome were Married Blitz (June 1945) and The Chinese Bungalow (October 1945). From a press report in July 1946:

- "The Hulme Hippodrome has been used by Mr Frank H Fortescue's repertory companies for the last five years, and over 250 different plays have been performed. Plays are given twice nightly and are generally popular in appeal. The previous Manchester Repertory Theatre Ltd went into liquidation in 1940. Mr Armitage Owen, its director, then took some of the members of the company to North Wales, where (apart from occasional tours) they have been ever since. ... He added that it had always been his intention to keep the name of the Manchester Repertory Company alive until it could return to a theatre in Manchester."

Repertory theatre is the idea of a permanent company of actors performing in just one theatre with a learnt catalogue of plays performed in rotation for a week at a time. Before that acting companies had to tour, and usually with just one play. Because it was grounded in one place, rep theatre led to more working class culture appearing on the stage. It seems that the Broadhead circuit of theatres added a variation to this rep model; with its resident companies based at their 'home' theatres in Hulme Hippodrome, Bury Hippodrome and Queen's Park Hippodrome, (Harpurhey, 1904-1966) and where the companies toured locally within the circuit. An advantage of this rotation was each theatre was able to stage more than one pantomime story each season.

In a biography of a variety artist and comedian, Wal Butler, between 1920 and 1950 - The 12.40 From Crewe - Randle Cutts relates some details about the Fortescue company, as follows:

- "These [theatrical revues] were mounted by Frank H Fortescue and Terence Byron, who were both responsible for repertory [companies] and owned theatres. Not much is known about either. They were enigmas. Between them they were responsible for the employment of hundreds of artistes at any one time, thousands overall. They didn't pay fabulous wages, but for anyone who came under their wings, all the year round work was ensured. Frank H Fortescue was a Birmingham man, whose main area of acting as an impresario was in the North West [of England], although he put in companies all over the country. Exactly the same in every respect was Terence Byron, whose offices were at 35, Abingdon Street, Blackpool. They had an agreement between themselves that all revues, pantomimes and repertory plays would play one another's theatres, and they also had an agreement with the Broadhead organisation that these would work the "Bread and Butter" Circuit as well."

In his self-published memoir The Bread and Butter Tour - A Theatrical Journey Through The North West, Randle Cutts, described his visits in the post-war variety era to theatres in what was still regarded as the Broadhead Circuit. He said that artists who worked regularly on this circuit called it the "bread and butter tour", because although it didn't pay very much, they were continuously in work. Randle Cutts was a school teacher in Oldham and a theatre enthusiast whose father managed a building firm based in North Manchester employing around 120 people, holding the maintenance contract for the Hipp as well as other theatres.

The British theatre format of rep had been created in Manchester in 1907 by Miss Horniman as she was known, (Annie Horniman 1860-1937) when she transformed The Gaiety Theatre in Manchester city centre. Her 'project' lasted just under 10 years but it left a lasting mark and was adopted by theatres across Britain. It was known as the 'Manchester School' of drama.

There was a cross-over between rep actors and variety performers, for example Eric Sykes who was born in Oldham and worked in rep at Oldham Coliseum and other theatres also did some comedy work on stage, before being hired by Frankie Howerd to write his Variety Bandbox acts and then appearing on stage again for the BBC, now as a comedian himself.

=== 1940 – alleged theft ===
From a press report:

- "Two soldiers who said they deserted after the evacuation from France were charged at Manchester City Police Court yesterday with breaking and entering the Trocadero Cinema, Rusholme, the Hulme Hippodrome, and premises in Lancaster Road, Fallowfleld, and were committed for trial at the next Quarter Sessions. They ... lodged together in Carlton Street, Moss Side, Manchester. Detective Mitchell said that ... from the Hulme Hippodrome £9 10s in money, 2,000 cigarettes, two bottles of champagne, and spirits to the value of £20 10s 6d. were taken".

=== 1949/50 refurbishment ===
From 1950 the theatre was being used again for variety performances. This change followed a short closure for an internal refurbishment, unreliably reported as being paid for by Dorothy Squires (married to Roger Moore), although others more reliably attribute the funding to James Brennan, who had added The Playhouse to his property portfolio in 1950. This refurbishment reduced the seating capacity by 200, down to 1,530 seats. To clarify, the confusion with Dorothy Squires probably relates to her restoration of the Astoria Theatre in New Dock, Llanelly (her home town) with her then-husband Billy Reid, which became his property on their separation in 1951; her relationship with Roger Moore starting later around 1953.

A press report in March 1950 said:

- "The Hulme Hippodrome, which changed over to variety a short while ago, has already acquired a distinctive atmosphere of popularity. ... The audience did a lot towards making the show go with a swing, and, with the theatre renovated with plenty of comfortable red plush and gilt cherubs, one sensed a long-established tradition rather than a new venture, a feeling that it is still the music-hall which is the people's theatre."

The Ink Spots played at Hulme Hippodrome, 31 October to 5 November 1949, and The Gypsy, their greatest hit had been written by Billy Reid.

In May 1950 a theatre review reported that Hulme Hippodrome was "Still finding its feet [again] as a variety theatre".

However, as one theatrical biographer noted, "The world of popular theatre had changed during the war, never to be the same again. The old touring circuits gradually began to collapse, but at first it was 'business as usual' in the immediate post war boom."

In 1950 the theatre name reverted to being known as - Hulme Hippodrome.

In 1953 permission was given by the City of Manchester council to add a fireproof corridor from the basement dressing rooms to a new exit to Warwick Street.

== 1950s – BBC recordings at the Hipp (1950–1961) ==
=== 1950s – BBC general ===
The earliest known radio outside broadcasts from Hulme Hippodrome are from February 1950: starting with a long-running series Variety Fanfare; plus The Norman Evans Show later in the year; and a 30-minute excerpt of a performance of the Hipp's seasonal Cinderella pantomime, transmitted on 5 January 1951 starring Frank Randle and Josef Locke.

From the BBC Written Archives Centre, Caversham, a file of correspondence exists on venue hire details for recordings at Hulme Hippodrome, with around 24 titles of different programmes recorded between February 1950 and January 1961, mostly radio with some TV towards the end. These archive papers are not exhaustive, and relate to venue hire details with just the programme titles being included in venue booking letters rather than the details of the creative content of each programme. The BBC hired the Hulme Hippodrome auditorium on Sunday evenings when there were no public performances, to make radio (audio) recordings of variety acts for radio programmes (and possibly later for TV) such as the regional then national programme radio series, Variety Fanfare.

In the 1950s there were three BBC radio networks or 'services' - Home, Light, and Third. The Light Service and the Third Programme were national services, and the Home Service was also national but with six regional opt-outs, one being NEHS - the North of England Home Service. Some of the recordings made at the Hulme Hippodrome were for the NEHS regional opt-out slots in the Home Service, and some were made for the Light Service which was national.

Three significant BBC staff who were associated with Hulme Hippodrome in the early 1950s were Ronnie Taylor and John Ammonds (writers and producers) and Peter Pilbeam (sound engineer, later producer). From a book on the history of the BBC's Variety Department, in the post-war years there was a need for the BBC to find good recording venues because:

- "studio and rehearsal facilities remained little short of deplorable with outdated fittings and equipment" and "Geoff Lawrence, who worked in Variety [Department] in Manchester, remembered the 'good, healthy, constructive and positive atmosphere .. [with] a friendly rivalry about it.' He continued, 'We had a pretty good regional head of programmes who talked our language ... and we were allowed that delightful freedom to experiment'."

In another book, the then programme engineer Peter Pilbeam explained about his work recording acts inside the Hulme Hippodrome for BBC radio:

- "We had a permanent outside broadcast control room in the circle, which was in fact a garden shed. No sound insulation whatsoever, it was an impossible place get a decent balance out of anything. We heard more through the walls than we did from the loudspeaker. We did some good stuff there, though."

This control room was called a 'removable box' and it was required urgently by the BBC in February 1950, ordered ten days before it was needed, at a cost of £38.

Peter Pilbeam went on to be a BBC producer. As shown in a poster, he produced the first BBC radio performance by the Beatles with Pete Best on drums, on Teenagers Turn (later, Here We Go), recorded in the BBC's Playhouse studio on 7 March 1962, transmitted on 8 March 1962 (next door to Hulme Hippodrome). In total they appeared five times in this radio series.

The first series of You're Only Young Once (all recorded at Hulme Hippodrome) was produced by Ronnie Taylor, followed by his protege producer John Ammonds MBE (1924–2013) as the producer for the second and third series and beginning his long association with Morecambe and Wise. John Ammonds later produced and directed their BBC television shows from 1968 to 1974. With Ronnie Taylor he also produced many radio series at Hulme Hippodrome for other comedians including Ken Platt and Jimmy Clitheroe.

Known recording dates of titles at Hulme Hipp in 1950s:	50	51	52	53	54	55	56
Al Read Show, The			x	x	x	x	
Call Boy (aka The Clitheroe Kid)						x	x
Charlie Chester Show, The					x		
Cinderella (pantomime)		x					
Gracie Fields Programme		x					
Home James		x	x				
Judge for Yourself					x		
Keep 'Em Laughing						x	
Ken Platt Show (aka You're Welcome!)					x	x	x
Landscape in Melody, A					x		
Make Yourself at Home					x		
Mixed Blessings						x	
Norman Evans Show, The	x						
Northern Lights						x	
Ring That Bell						x	
Show Goes On, The						x	
Showtime			x				
Spice of Life			x	x			
Spotlight					x	x	
Tip Top Tunes		x					
Variety Fanfare	x	x	x	x	x		
What Makes a Star?					x		
You're Only Young Once (aka Morecambe and Wise Show)				x	x		

=== 1950s – BBC Variety Fanfare ===
In some reports, Variety Fanfare (1950–1954), started as a regional radio programme, though by August 1952 the Radio Times describes it as being broadcast on the (national) Light Service. Some reports have Variety Fanfare as the North's answer to London's Variety Bandbox. The radio series Northern Variety Parade started around 1956.

Produced for the BBC between February 1950 and June 1954, firstly by Bowker Andrews and then Ronnie Taylor, Variety Fanfare was a career-building radio series for many Northern comedians including Morecambe and Wise. There are also reports that these early 1950s radio performances by comedians included Bob Monkhouse, Ken Platt, and Al Read, with Frankie Vaughan as a warm-up artist. Tony Handcock performed in Variety Fanfare, transmitted on 20 June 1954. Ronnie Taylor's uncatalogued archive collection is held at the V&A, inaccessible until 2024 when their new archive building opens.

The BBC described Variety Fanfare in the Radio Times as, "high speed variety". The high speed variety format was developed in the UK in the 1930s, imported from the US vaudeville, where there were no pauses between acts and artists would be fined if they caused a 'stage wait'. "A gap between acts was known as a 'stage wait',... an unforgivable sin in any performance... In a No 1 theatre heads would roll!" Prior to the 1930s, variety in the UK included many long pauses, for example for costume changes in the wings mid-way as well as between acts.

=== 1950s – BBC Northern Variety Orchestra (NVO) at the Hipp ===
The BBC Northern Dance Orchestra (NDO) was based at The Playhouse and was created in 1956; which grew out of the BBC Northern Variety Orchestra (NVO) which was created on 1 April 1951 and played at the Hipp but is less researched to date. Analogue audio magnetic tapes of both orchestras are held in archives. The main change, apart from moving from the Hipp to The Playhouse next door, was the removal of the strings section as the NVO transitioned into the more famous NDO.

From a local history booklet in 1994, a musician who played in the NVO states:

- "The Northern Dance Orchestra had its origins in the Ray Martin Orchestra, which included singer Jimmy Young (and, incidentally, myself). Later on this became the BBC NVO - the Northern Variety Orchestra - and when Ray Martin left he was replaced as conductor by Vilem Tausky, who was followed later by Alyn Ainsworth. The NVO contained a string section led by the notable violinist Norman George, who had left the Hallé orchestra in 1950, and during the transition Norman was an ever-present stalwart. Then there was a switch in policy (a phenomenon known today as 'cuts'), the strings were eliminated and we saw the emergence of the NDO."

A photo of Albert Dyson, cellist, NVO has a catalogue note: "He played with the BBC Northern when they used to do the music for variety shows at the Hulme Hippodrome". It is held in the archives at Manchester Central Library.

=== 1950s – BBC & Al Read ===
Al Read's breakthrough radio broadcast was on 17 February 1950 on Variety Fanfare; produced by Bowker Andrews with Ronnie Taylor polishing his improvised sketch into a script. He previously had had stage fright, which may explain why the sketch was recorded in a studio, however it quickly led to his regular performances on stage in further Variety Fanfare episodes, recorded at Hulme Hippodrome. Nevertheless, when he appeared on stage for recordings the BBC stipulated to the venue managers that no-one could sit in the circle or balcony, only on the ground level in the stalls.

The Al Read Show was recorded at Hulme Hippodrome probably between 1952 and 1955 following a trial recording on 5 August 1951. A press article in 2001 was written as a 50-year retrospective about Al Read. Based on a set of self-published books by Mike Craig, Look Back With Laughter (1996) the article said:

- "When Al Read's brand of northern humour hit the airwaves... he became an overnight star. ... a BBC radio variety producer ... persuaded [Al Read] to repeat the stories on the show Variety Fanfare, produced each week at the Hulme Hippodrome. The spot was so successful that ... he was [later] engaged by the BBC as resident comedian on Variety Bandbox" recorded in London. He later played at the Adelphi Theatre in London and in several Royal Variety Shows.

In his autobiography published in 1985, Al Read says, "From the beginning I recorded my [monthly] radio shows at the Paris Pullman cinema, Regent Street." in London. From archived copies of correspondence between the BBC and Hulme Hippodrome the venue was booked for the "Al Read Show" on 6 December 1953, 17 January 1954, 20 March, 23 October and 6 November 1955, and 24 June 1956. This minority of recordings, as well as the trial in 1951, may have been while he was visiting family members in Salford.

=== 1950s – BBC & Ken Dodd ===
In "about 1951, 1952" Ken Dodd was playing on stage at the Hipp, as a 'guest artist' or stand-in as he later said, on contract to James Brennan, including appearing in the same bill as Ted Lune. Ken Dodd appeared on stage (ie non-BBC) at the Hipp in a revue called Lovely to Look At in the week of 19 October 1953 before turning professional in 1954.

It was around this time that Ken Dodd said he appeared on the same radio programme recorded at the Hipp as Max Miller, a hero of his, said to be in October 1953 but possibly the instance in March 1955. Max Miller had been 'demoted' to play 'number two' theatres for around 18 months after he deliberately over-ran his stage act at the Royal Variety Performance on 13 November 1950.

Ken Dodd went on to record in the Playhouse after it was purchased by the BBC as a permanent studio. Speaking on a radio programme in 2002, Ken Dodd recalled the following details:

- "[The BBC] midday musical, which they used to record on a Sunday evening, that's when I first got my first title. Jimmy Casey, James Casey. As he went on into the compere, he said, I know, 'Here is the nut from Knotty Ash', and then they laughed. And I said, what was that, what was that all about? It was the one joke that I can't see because I've lived there all my life and I can't see anything funny or laughable. But Knotty Ash! Didsbury? Yes. Clapham? Absolutely, but not Knotty Ash, I think it's beautiful. Then he got me a radio series called It's Great to be Young [in October 1958]. And that was my first radio series from the Hulme Playhouse [sic] produced by Jimmy Casey in it was Peter Goodwright. Judith Chalmers long before she was Wish You Were Here. Or there. Or anywhere." [and he added]
- "I played the Hulme Hippodrome as a sort of, I would fill in a guest artist if you want to put it politely, in about 1951, 1952. The gentleman who owned the Hippodrome was Jimmy Brennan, James Brennan. And he put me into one of these revues, and usually were 'bearskins and blushes,' Strip! Strip! Hooray! - all these sort of saucy titles. And on the first one, I played that with Ted Lune. Ted Lune was the top of the bill. And he was the first one to say, "Now, I've got a letter from me mum," and he used to read letters from his mum with all the jokes in. And that would be a full revue. All sorts of acrobats and jugglers and girls singing and whatnot. One more piece of history certainly for Ken Dodd at the Hulme Playhouses [sic]. I once had the honour of being on the same bill on the radio show as Max Miller, the Max Miller, the man, the granddaddy of all comedians, was on that bill and I was on with Max Miller and he was a lovely man. Very happy days, the Hulme Hippodrome."

Ken Dodd and Max Miller appeared in the same episode of the BBC radio programme recorded at the Hipp, The Show Goes On, recorded on 27 March 1955 and broadcast nationally on the Light Programme on 31 March 1955, and again in April 1955. Other artists in that episode included Morecambe & Wise and Violet Carson.

=== 1950s – BBC & Morecambe and Wise ===
In their first substantial series of radio broadcasts on the BBC, Morecambe and Wise featured in 45 episodes of Variety Fanfare from Hulme Hippodrome as contributors.

Morecambe and Wise soon had their first radio show of their own at the Hipp, You're Only Young Once (YOYO) originally for six episodes (broadcast: 9 Nov - 14 Dec 1953; Home Service, North region) then extended to nine episodes (broadcast: 22 Dec 1953 - 4 Jan 1954), all recorded at Hulme Hippodrome. The first series was produced by Ronnie Taylor, followed by his protege producer John Ammonds for the second and third series.

- YOYO series 1–9 November 1953 to 4 January 1954
- YOYO series 2–6 May 1954 to 24 June 1954
- YOYO series 3–1 October 1954 to 9 December 1954.In 2009.

Doreen Wise rediscovered a collection of recordings (magnetic tapes and acetate discs) at her home. Some were made at Hulme Hippodrome by the BBC sound engineers for Ernie Wise in addition to the BBC official recordings of some of their radio sessions. These recordings included all episodes in the first series of YOYO . Excerpts of this collection were rebroadcast on BBC Radio 4 in 2010.

Writing about this period, Eric Morecambe's son Gary wrote in 2023 about the YOYO series that:

- "Getting on the radio was a really big deal in the 1940s and '50s, as it would take the Queen's coronation in 1953 for television to really present any notable competition. Eric and Ernie had first appeared on radio in 1942, before moving on to Workers' Playtime, which gave them a much bigger listenership. From this they got an audition from a London producer for Variety Bandbox. This was a big breakthrough, and led to their own series, broadcast from Manchester, called You're Only Young Once - or YOYO, as inevitably it became known. Listening to what survives today, I'm struck by just how good they already were. These were men in their twenties, and yet the energy and timing that would mark them out so clearly in later years was already evident. The material might have been somewhat thin, but I've always believed that Morecambe and Wise were never purely about material. The key to them was always their relationship and their timing. They had what Kenneth Branagh once described to me as sing-song voices that all the great comedians have. And it's true. As you listen you're pulled in and along by the quick rhythm of their style, and find yourself smiling and even laughing out loud - and this on old 78 rpm vinyl copies of work recorded over seventy years ago."

After their first TV series, Running Wild in April - June 1954, criticised in press reviews, they returned to radio, to Ronnie Taylor and to Hulme Hippodrome to make a radio series in 1955, The Show Goes On, in the variety format with other artists including Ken Dodd (recorded: 27 March, 17 April 1955; broadcast: 31 March, 21 April 1955; and other dates, Light Programme [national]).

Morecambe and Wise also played at least three live acts to regular paying audiences at Hulme Hippodrome, Monday to Saturday, one time as second billing to the ventriloquist Dennis Spicer. One of the week-long stage performances by Morecambe and Wise was 6–11 December 1954 where they were top of the bill, with details in a printed programme.

=== 1955 – BBC moves next door to the Playhouse ===
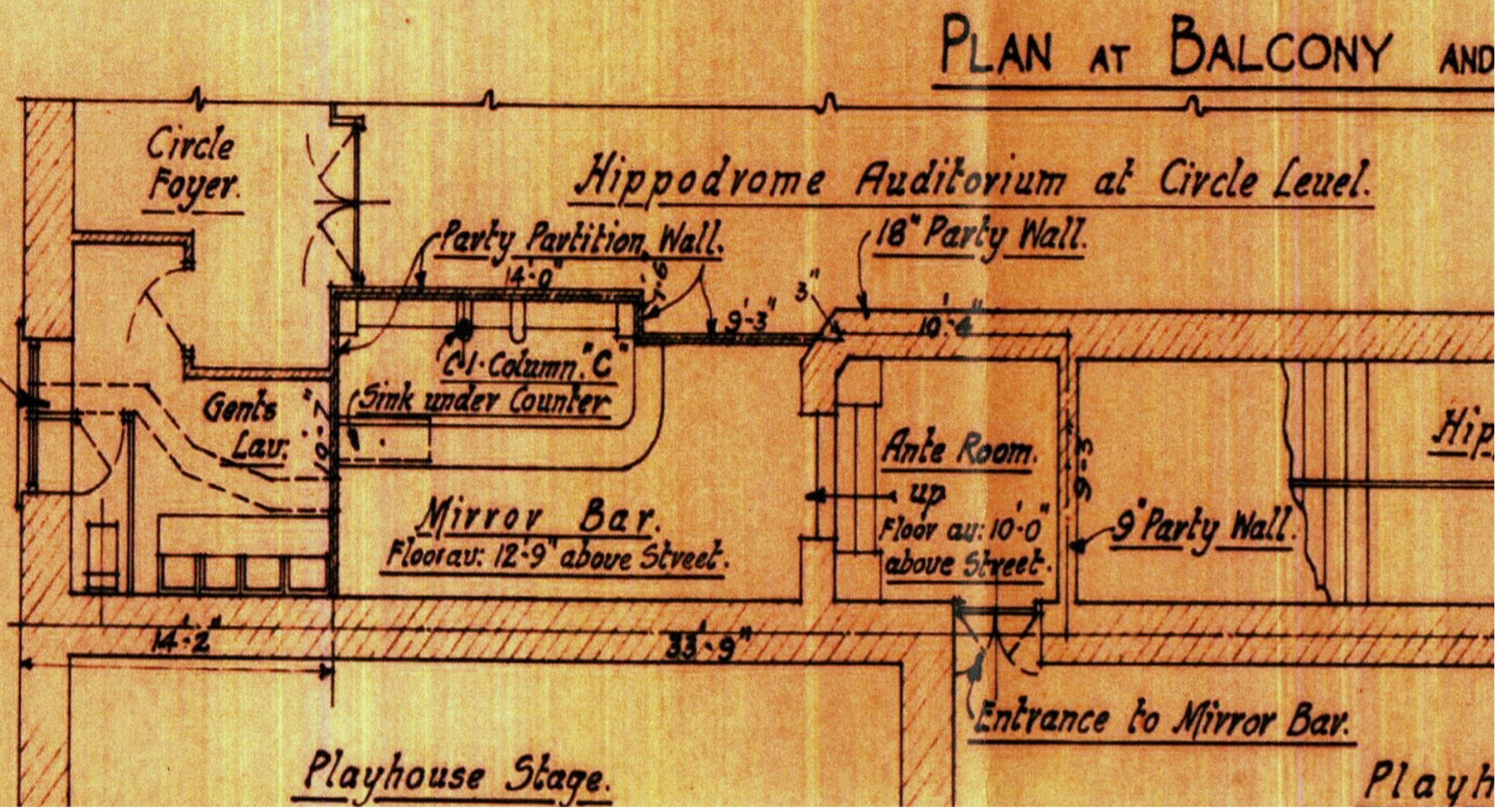
Extract from architectural drawing showing the new party wall, allocating the Mirror Bar to the Playhouse.

One of the last programmes (this one being for TV) known to have been recorded at Hulme Hippodrome which was broadcast on Sunday 2 October 1955, possibly live, was called, Northern Lights, and the listing details are: "The BBC North Region presents stars from show business with the Raymond Woodhead Singers [plus the] BBC Northern Variety Orchestra, conducted by Alyn Ainsworth before an invited audience in the Hulme Hippodrome, Manchester. Produced by Ronnie Taylor and Eric Miller."

In December 1955, the connecting doorways in the party wall between the conjoined theatres were bricked up when the BBC bought the Playhouse Theatre from James Brennan to use as a full-time radio and TV recording studio, using it for 30 years until around 1986.

There are records of the Call Boy programme (aka The Clitheroe Kid) being recorded ("filmed") for BBC TV, moving on from its previous radio format, on 12 December 1956 at Hulme Hipp.

The programme You're Welcome was also a one-hour "TV film" made in 1956 with the Northern Variety Orchestra, possibly at Hulme Hipp.

=== 1950s – oral history programme on both theatres, Radio 4 ===
On 2 April 2002 BBC Radio 4 broadcast episode 3 of 6 in the Palace of Laughter series, this episode being on The Playhouse and Hulme Hippodrome. It was produced by Libby Cross and presented by Geoffrey Wheeler, with interviews with Ken Dodd, Jimmy Casey, Johnny Roadhouse, Ronnie Taylor, and Roy Chappell. Clips used included Al Read, and Morecambe and Wise. A copy exists online and a transcript is available.

In October 1957 Jimmy Brennan told the BBC he was prepared to sell them Hulme Hippodrome to add to their 1955 purchase from him of The Playhouse theatre. He was asking for £60,000 with the shops, or £50,000 without the shops. In March 1959 a team of BBC officials inspected the premises. Their conclusion was that it would not be suitable acoustically for a 70-person orchestra because the stage would be too small, especially if there were "small choirs", and extending the stage into the auditorium would create 'two acoustics'. The offer to sell is declined by the BBC in April 1960.

== 1950s – variety and revue shows, rock and roll gigs ==
=== Strictly Northern ===
"So it was after 1950 when I first attended [the Hipp] and I was entranced. This was like no other theatre I had ever visited before, strictly northern in its approach rather than cosmopolitan and offering different shows and [artistes] that I had ever seen before. I wasn't to know at the time that I was about to witness the last glorious kick of the post war variety boom before the theatre closed its doors to live stage entertainment forever."

=== 1950s – variety artists on stage at the Hipp (non-BBC) ===
The popular Lancashire comedian Frank Randle (1901-1957) reportedly was responsible for £1,000 a week in box office takings at the Hipp in 1950, but by 1954 he owed the Inland Revenue £54,000.

On 17 September 1953 Shirley Bassey appeared with other singers in the touring show, Memories of Jolson. This was said to be her first professional tour as a singer. She next appeared in May 1954 in Harlem Jazz, where a newspaper review of her performance at Hulme Hippodrome said, "Shirley Bassey sings old and new blues tunes with real zip".

Barry Took made his premiere professional career appearance in August 1951 at the Hulme Hippodrome.

The increasing use of the revue format for a whole 2-hour performance was to save costs. The revue format booked and used all the artists as a single company, with each artist taking on multiple roles across the different slots. As Randle S. Cutts noted in his memoir:

- "Jimmy Brennan couldn't keep putting on the same names ad infinitum so he joined forces with Will Collins, a very experienced producer / agent, who had a host of names in his stable. For the first time at the Hippodrome Will Collins brought in top class pantomimes which ran longer, running several weeks. ... He was able to provide whole reviews with supporters."

During 2–7 March 1953 and again for the week of 18–23 April 1955 there was an Ice Show at the Hulme Hipp, using freezing equipment which had to be installed "with all possible speed" on the Sunday.

In October 1955 there was press coverage over a 'kangaroo' (possibly smaller, a wallaby) that went missing from the Hipp, as follows:

- An illusionist's kangaroo was captured by police after it had been seen hopping along Cornbrook Street, Old Trafford, Manchester, early yesterday. It waited in a city police cell to be bailed out by the Great Levante, who makes it disappear every night. Jo-Jo, who is six months old and two feet tall, vanishes regularly on the stage for the illusionist. On Monday he vanished completely from Hulme Hippodrome. Mr Levante's manager said: "He must have been taken, because he could not just wander about without being spotted."

Based on surviving printed programmes, an example from 1956 was an 11-act variety show which included the Wilson, Keppel & Betty dance act, and an example from 1957 was a revue - Toujour L'Amour, "a high speed Parisienne peep show" - which included Reg Varney as the lead performer.

=== 1950s – pantomimes ===
In the winter of 1955-56 from 26 December 1955 the pantomime at the Hipp was Cinderella, from a poster held at the National Fairground and Circus Archive at the University of Sheffield. In the winter of 1957-58 the pantomime at the Hipp was Babes in the Wood, starring the variety singer Mary Naylor. The following year, 1958–59, the panto season was Aladdin and His Wonderful Lamp, featuring The Mudlarks.

=== 1950s – rock 'n roll ===
In the later 1950s the theatre was used at times for Rock and Roll performances, sometimes within a wider variety programme. For example, from a poster, Art Baxter and His Rock and Roll Sinners were playing within an 11-acts programme on 11 February 1957, and appearing again on 8 April 1957.

The following Rock and Roll, Skiffle and other musical acts reportedly played at the Hulme Hippodrome, 1956 to 1959, however the listings include some confusions between Hulme Hipp and Manchester Hipp. The Chas McDevitt and the Terry Dene gigs have been corroborated with surviving printed programmes and posters for Hulme Hipp:

- The Hilltoppers, 27 August 1956
- Mitchell Torok, 18–23 March 1957
- Max Wall, 24–29 June 1957
- Chas McDevitt Skiffle Group, 5–10 August 1957
- Terry Dene; The Teenagers, 3–8 February 1958 (note: 28 October - 2 November 1957 was at Manchester Hippodrome).

In his book on skiffle during the mid-1950s, Billy Bragg wrote: "Jim Reno, owner of Reno's music store in Manchester, one of the largest in the north of England, declared, 'I cannot cope with the demand for guitars with young lads in here every day asking for them. One day last week I sold 100 guitars'."

However, some people at the time reported that the addition of rock 'n roll acts drove away the previously regular variety customers, though others also blamed TV for this audience decline. One contemporary account reported:

- "The final nail in the coffin of the variety theatres was the introductions of rock n' roll turns, which alienated the regular customers. No longer could standard variety acts be relied upon [to fill theatres], and regular patrons showed their displeasure by stamping out noisily through the crash doors [emergency exits] when these [musicians] appeared, never to return."

=== 1950s – circus animal acts ===
Performances (turns) that included animals were a regular feature in variety performances, and sometimes the whole programme would consist of animal acts from a visiting 'circus' or 'zoo'. For example, on 9–15 December 1957 the Hip Hip Zoo Ray performance by the Robert Brothers Circus was given twice each night (6.30pm, 8.30pm) "presenting animals from the four corners of the earth" including elephants, lions, llamas, ponies, kangaroos, cats and poodles. Other performances were given the Royal Italian Circus, the Chapmans Circus, the Royal Majestic Circus with Harry Benet, and the Royal Imperial Circus with Don Ross. At times the stage had to have its basement supports reinforced for the extra weight of these performances. From the same memoir as much of this circus information, "Circuses travelling by rail were just starting up again and that was also a big part of [the work by railway liaison and theatre staff in] attending to the animals, walking the elephants to the Hulme Hippodrome, stabling them under the railway arches etc."

This was a continuation of animal acts from previous times. For example, writing about pantomimes in the 1930s Randle Cutts noted that they often included animals:

- "There was a choice of several miniature circuses to include, like Wrights, Aliens or Gandeys. They brought ponies, dogs, monkeys etc. The ponies served the double purpose of pulling Cinderella's illuminated coach. The Circus might provide acrobats or a low-wire act as a 'spesh'. [speciality acts]"

=== 1950s – nudity ===
In terms of 'adult' entertainment being shown in variety theatres, it had been a component of shows for many years, and Hulme Hippodrome was no different. The advertising term often used was 'revue'. For example "Nudity was nothing new in variety. In 1937, an American striptease artist called Diana Raye was booked to appear ... at the [London] Palladium". Although this trend had started before the Second World War, the 1950s saw it increase, for example, there were "the low-budget touring nude revues that increasingly dominated the dying circuit in the 1950s. The name La Clique is an interesting choice of title, suggesting a show aimed at a select" clientele and hoping for a sophisticated image for the venues.

Specific examples of such shows at Hulme Hippodrome included, Don't Blush Girls, How To Undress (July 1939), Bon Soir, Mesdames - The Nudes Internationale (August 1950), Strip Tease Special, and Strip! Strip! Hooray! (both July 1958).

There are seniors within the Save Hulme Hippodrome campaign who have recorded in oral history sessions their memories from being young children living in Hulme in the 1950s and visiting the Hipp, often unaccompanied. These records include watching the act, Jane (Chrystabel Leighton-Porter), at a time before there were formal age-appropriate restrictions on who could attend performances. The seniors group also remember seeing the nude tableau vivant led by Phyllis Dixey.

However, there were also examples of informal child safeguarding behaviours at the time. Another senior from the Hulme community recalled,

- "In the early sixties my mum worked there as a cleaner. We would get free tickets for the amazing shows, sitting up in the balcony. Then when the dancing girls came on we were ushered out, and let back in the balcony when they were finished" - where 'dancing girls' was a euphemism used when speaking to children.

=== 1950s – Coronation Street actors ===
The TV programme Coronation Street started on ITV (Granada) in 1960, and at least three of its initial actors had worked previously in the 1950s at Hulme Hippodrome and other theatres. Violet Carson (as Ena Sharples) had previously played the piano at Hulme Hippodrome. Jill Summers (as Phyllis Pearce) had appeared as a comedian with a stage role as a railway porter in uniform and with a trolley and two suitcases as props, telling stories and jokes. Bill Waddington (as Percy Sugden) had appeared in pantomime as The Old Woman who Lived in a Shoe.

Another Coronation Street actor was Arthur Lowe, who also later starred in Dad's Army. He had acted in the army entertainments during the Second World War, and afterwards he joined the Frank H Fortescue Company at the Hulme Hippodrome, where he met his wife, Joan Cooper, the company's leading lady.

Don Estelle, the actor and singer, was born in Crumpsall, Manchester, and he first performed in front of a live theatre audience when singing the same song 12 times a week in the show The Backyard Kids at the Hulme Hippodrome in the early 1950s. In the 1960s he worked as an acting extra at Granada Television, throwing darts in the Rovers Return in Coronation Street. It was while working there that Arthur Lowe suggested he contact Jimmy Perry and David Croft, which got him a minor part in 1969 in the 10-year series of Dad's Army as a delivery worker and later the role of Gerald, a deputy ARP Warden. This work led to his leading role with the character of Lofty in Perry and Croft's series, It Ain't Half Hot Mum from 1974 to 1981.

== 1960s – Night Club, Mecca Bingo ==
The Hippodrome was probably last used as a variety theatre for the public in 1960. Possibly the last pantomime staged was Dick Whittington and his Cat from 24 December 1959 for five and a half weeks into January 1960.

=== A second bar ===
From an archived draft report to the Watch Committee dated 19 January 1960 the permission that had been given in 1935, allowing alcohol sales for the first time, was for a single bar "on the first-floor balcony to the Floral Hall" with a drinking area of 25 m2, which shortly afterwards had an approved increase of 45 m2; a total of 70 m2.

"A further application to increase this area [had been] refused by the Committee in August 1939." according to the background details in the 1960 report.

The report focussed on a proposal to the Committee to reduce the size of the first floor bar and the create a new bar on the ground floor of the Floral Hall, which was recommended for approval. It is possible that Jimmy Brennan applied for approval for a second bar in order to make the property more valuable when selling.

=== Bill Benny (1960 - 1962) ===
In November 1960 the Hipp was reportedly bought by Bill Benny (1918-1963) for £35,000. However, HM Land Registry has no record of this transfer of ownership; but it does record a sale on 29 March 1962 from Brennan's Cinemas Limited to Mecca Limited. Instead, Bill Benny might have had a short-term rental of the building which he embellished in press reports. There is evidence that he had use of the building, booking letters on his headed notepaper are held in BBC archives.

Bill Benny by then had retired as a professional wrestler and was working as a theatrical agent and promoter and was an alleged gangster. He used the Hipp for 'adult' entertainment and a number of archived black & white photographs exist from this era showing the exterior of the building with large posters for 'nude shows'. Probably from this time, "The Queen was visiting the area when a striptease show was showing. Her Majesty's Royal entourage was to pass posters advertising it. It was arranged that the title of the attraction should be blacked out so as not to offend Royalty."

Bill Benny was associated with the Quality Street Gang and with the criminal Jimmy Savile who managed the Mecca-owned Plaza Ballroom which was adjacent to Benny's Cabaret Club on Oxford Road.

For three months in 1961 (17 June - 15 Sept 1961) the Hulme Hipp was rented by the BBC (full-time, not just on Sundays) from Bill Benny for broadcasting light entertainment programmes while The Playhouse was being refurbished, with invited audiences.

On 29 March 1962 Bill Benny claimed to have sold the Hipp to Mecca Entertainments for use as a bingo hall, contrary to official records. He claimed he was paid in Mecca shares reportedly worth somewhere between £35,000 and £50,000. The same month the New Musical Express (NME) published a photograph of Bill Benny meeting in the USA with Vic Lewis, Elvis Presley and Colonel Tom Parker to try to arrange for Elvis to perform at a charity concert in the UK, which was unsuccessful.

=== 1962 – New owner: Mecca for bingo (until 1985) ===
After the purchase on 29 March 1962 the Hipp was initially renamed as Mecca Bingo Preston Street and later as the Mecca Social Club, though photographs show "Hippodrome" lettering on the aluminium cladding added during the 1960s and 1970s. The bingo evenings ended sometime after September 1980 (the date of the last new member registered, from an ex-staff account) and after some years as a social club and then a pool hall, the venue reportedly closed in 1988. One of the Hipp staff members was the mother of the singer Morrissey when they were living in Queen's Court near the Loreto convent before the Victorian-era houses there were demolished.

The 1962 purchase led to some internal changes, in particular the sloping auditorium had a wooden 'false' floor built to create a level surface for the change in layout from rows of theatre seating to a grid pattern of bingo tables with chairs around them. This new floor was almost level to the stage height. The stage was also 'boxed in' to make it smaller. These wooden constructions have since been removed. There were also two external changes: one of the shop units was converted to become a new and wider doorway for access to the bingo hall, and the booking office window at the front was made smaller.

In a press report a spokesperson for Mecca said,

- "it will be redecorated and will reopen in about five weeks ... The theatre was 'broken down and needing a lot of improvements,' but these would be carried out without destroying the character of the building. ... the theatre would be available for amateur operatic and dramatic societies which might want to stage Christmas pantomimes or musical shows."

From June to August 1968 there is correspondence held in Archives-Plus (in Manchester Central Library) which includes planning discussions between Mecca Ltd, BBC, and Manchester City Council planners on the details of a planned refurbishment scheme.

=== 1960s – "slum" clearances, largest number in Manchester ===
During the 1950s the government's slum clearance programmes resumed after the war, and in Manchester 68,000 houses were deemed to be unfit. When comparing slum clearance programmes in the six cities of Manchester, Leeds, Birmingham, Liverpool, Sheffield and Bristol, the figures suggested that for the five years ending June 1965, Manchester was ahead of the other cities in the number of houses either demolished or compulsorily purchased with a view to demolition. It wasn't until the late 1960s when the trauma and community harm of wide-area clearances were appreciated and policy and housing law changed towards funding refurbishment programmes, but too late for Hulme.

On 11 April 1962 there is a press report concerning the state of the houses around Hulme Hippodrome, saying it was "the biggest area to be recommended for slum clearance in Manchester since the war", leading to 1,280 homes being demolished by around 1965 and many of the old roads being 'stopped up' and removed. This urban renewal displaced many families who were the theatre's local audiences, before new residents returned to live in Hulme. The newspaper article mentions Hulme Hippodrome in particular:

- "The latest area includes the Playhouse Theatre, now used by the BBC, and the Hulme Hippodrome Theatre, which has just been taken over by Mecca Ltd, and is to be converted mainly as a hall for bingo and housey-housey. A corporation official said that they would not necessarily be affected by the clearance of neighbouring properties. Their future would be considered separately when the proposals to redevelop the area were considered."

As a consequence of these proposals, Preston Street which was the main road at the front of Hulme Hippodrome was removed ('stopped up') and only a footpath now remains from one of the pavements.

Many of the displaced residents still object to Hulme being called a "slum" in official reports, for example from an oral history project within the Save Hulme Hippodrome campaign. Reportedly many of the families living in Hulme were "removed by the Manchester Corporation to overspill estates on Langley Estate, Middleton and Darnhill Estate, Heywood". There was a further phase of other urban regeneration in Hulme in the 1990s, removing many of the 1960s buildings, yet still leaving the role of the 1901 Hulme Hippodrome unresolved.

In 2024 Simon Jenkins wrote about his memories from the slum clearances in Hulme and his days there as a young reporter:

- "One of my most depressing experiences was to witness the implementing of Rowland Nicholas's Manchester clearances from the city's Hulme district at the end of the 1960s. We [press] observers were invited to watch fleets of coaches lined up in the rain outside a community centre to transport the residents with their cases to new towns miles away. Hulme was undeniably a slum - the council had neglected it for decades - but these people had spent their lives attached to its streets, families and community of friends. They needed only heating and plumbing. No one asked them if they wanted to move. The community centre was full of bemused and miserable faces. We compared them to wartime refugees awaiting transportation. I do not recall a single smile. We later saw aerial photographs of their abandoned neighbourhood, a flattened landscape identical to that of wartime Warsaw after its bulldozing by the Wehrmacht. Apologists now say the architects meant well and thought they were offering Mancunians a better future. I find that hard to believe. Officials on the ground behaved as if they were only obeying orders. At Hulme, Hugh Wilson and Lewis Womersley, architect of Park Hill, designed a new estate of deck access Crescents, boasted as the biggest public housing project in Europe. It opened in 1972 to house 13,000 people. The Crescents came immediately under attack, described by the Architects' Journal as 'hideous, system-built deck-access blocks ... Europe's worst housing stock.' Within two years tenancies were declared 'for adults only'. The estate was crime-ridden and the police [allegedly] refused to visit it, claiming it was 'private'. Rents were not collected and by the late 1980s the new Hulme was abandoned as its tenants just walked away. ... [Between 1993 and 1995], just twenty years after their construction, the Hulme Crescents were demolished as uninhabitable. After £400 million (nearly £900 million today) had been spent trying to rescue it, the estate was turned over to the private sector. I know of no Inquiry in the Hulme fiasco. Any of Hulme's few once-slum terrace houses that managed to escape demolition now fetch £250,000 on the open market."

=== 1960s – Mecca Social Club, aluminium cladding, proposal to convert Floral Hall ===
In early 1966 Mecca are in discussions with Manchester City Council for planning permission to create a new 'Gaming Room' which will be the first floor of the Floral Hall, but apparently this type of conversion didn't happen until 1987 by new owners. Archived letters show a that such plans were submitted on 17 January 1966.

In 1968 there is further correspondence seeking planning permission to fix aluminium cladding to the building. The system described was Flexalum aluminium cladding with Luxaflex insulation between the brick walls and the aluminium slats. The BBC were invited to continue with the cladding around The Playhouse, but they said they didn't have funds for this. The cladding was removed as dangerous by Manchester City Council in June 2007.

== 1970s – Mecca Bingo, then Mecca Social Club ==
By 1971, from photographs the remaining shop frontages had been rendered over and the rooms were used for storage with new internal doorways. Few other reliable accounts of activities in the Hipp during the 1970s are currently available.

=== 1977 – Grade II Listed Building ===
In June 1977, the Hulme Hippodrome was recognised for its architectural importance and became a Grade II listed building. The building name given at this stage is "Mecca Social Club", and The Playhouse is also listed as Grade II the same day, with each referring to the other in terms of their 'group value'. At this point the glass apex roof of the Floral Hall atrium had been replaced with corrugated aluminium, and this change might have been the trigger event for listing the building.

The listing states that the principal reasons for Grade II listing are:

1. Building type: it is a good example of a large provincial theatre illustrative of the burgeoning demand for music hall and theatrical entertainment in the late-C19/early-C20;
2. Interior quality: the main auditorium is a richly detailed and flamboyant space decorated with ornate painted and gilded Rococo plasterwork;
3. Level of survival: despite later alteration occurring to the rest of the building the principal space of the main auditorium remains largely unaltered;
4. Design interest: the auditorium incorporates straight rows of seats to the balconies [Upper Circle]; an atypical arrangement in theatres at this time and a Broadhead Circuit theatre characteristic;
5. Historic interest: it was constructed for the Broadhead Circuit, one of the largest independently-managed theatre circuits in the country, and hosted numerous well-known early-mid C20 performers;
6. Group value: it has strong group value with the adjacent Grade II listed The Playhouse ... the two theatres together representing an unusual twin theatre arrangement.

=== 1977 – BBC TV feature ===
On 14 July 1977 the BBC Look North programme featured the Hulme Hippodrome, presented by Alistair Macdonald. The programme showed the exterior and the interior of the building following a recent internal "redecoration" to treat areas "covered in dust and grime", and that "very little repair work was needed". The notes states that the building had a "re-birth for a few hours ... as an old style music hall." The filming of the stage area shows the bingo signboards in place. The manager at the time is interviewed, and he lists some of the previous performers having been: Charlie Chaplin, Florrie Forde, Frankie Vaughan, Tessie O'Shea, and Flanagan and Allen.

On 7 December 1977 Manchester City Council gave Listed Building Consent for "internal alterations to social club" and the building was referred to as the "Mecca Social Club".

== 1980s – a social club, snooker hall, music gigs, going dark ==
In 1980 the last application from someone for bingo membership is reportedly shown in a company ledger, as 23 September 1980, though other reports state that the bingo continued well into the 1980s in the auditorium, alongside the operation of the social club in the Floral Hall.

=== 1982 – Social club alterations ===
In January 1982 Manchester City Council gave its Listed Building Consent for "internal alterations to social club" to the Floral Hall. A later owner of the Hipp considered this refurbishment to be as a response by Mecca to the 1981 urban riots.

=== 1985 – New owner: Mecca Entertainments sells to offshore company ===
On 28 January 1985 the Hipp was sold by Mecca Entertainments to a company based offshore in Jersey (Clobart Property Investments Limited, 1976-1987) who owned the Hipp until selling it at the end of the year. Correspondence with Jersey Archive confirms a dissolved company named Clobart Property Holdings Ltd but no details within their file regarding the Hipp.

In 1985 a trade magazine reported that an 8-week summer season of Saturday night cabaret shows was being organised by Arthur Fee, a theatre-minded businessman, saying "Variety comes back to the old bingo hall [where] Hulme Hippodrome will shortly be staging its first variety show in 25 years".

In an interview published in a book on the women involved in Factory Records, Nicki Kefalas recalled:

- I was interviewed for the radio and TV PR director job by all three founding members in different ways back in October 1985. ... Rob [Gretton] 'interviewed' me on the night his son Benedict was born. It involved going out on a bender with him and various people, including Hurricane Higgins, in a pool hall in Hulme. I stayed over at Rob and Lesley's that night and had a terrible hangover the next day, of course. I think I was the favourite candidate at that stage, to have been invited on the 'wetting the baby's head' night of celebrations. Nowadays, I think it'd be much more complicated, but back then, it was basically if you were in the right group of people, you could get somewhere. Somehow, I gravitated toward the right people who were interested in the same things as me.

=== 1986 – New owners: mostly Derbyshire, "The Hippodrome Social Club" ===
In the next eight years the ownership of the Hipp changes formally three times, but from an interview with a former director it is the same principal person from 1986 to 2003, and their father from 1985 to 1986:

- 31 December 1985, Kingscliffe Holdings Limited, Birkenhead
- 18 April 1986, J & A Leisure Limited, Derbyshire
- 22 December 1993, Brooks Wilkinson Limited, Derbyshire (same address, owned until 2003).

Brooks Wilkinson Ltd was a regional company based in Derbyshire that had been established in 1974 to own theatres, bingo halls and gambling venues. This purchase date by Brooks Wilkinson Ltd is supported by a schedule of transfers obtained from the Land Registry and from research interviews.

On 19 September 1986, J & A Leisure Ltd of Derbyshire issue a public notice as part of their application for a licence to sell alcohol within the Hipp. At this stage the venue is being advertised as "The Hippodrome Bingo and Social Club" but bingo was removed before the building re-opened after the internal alterations to the Floral Hall.

=== 1987 – New first floor and snooker hall ===
On 20 February 1987 Manchester City Council gave Listed Building Consent for "alterations to form a new lounge and first floor billiard / snooker room", and later in 1987 (possibly March 1987) the social club / snooker hall space was expanded by contracting the Jarvis construction company to install a concrete first floor, using the existing metal supports to the first floor balcony to take the weight of concrete plus 10 pool tables. The original features, minus the first floor balcony, are reportedly still in situ. The architects were KDP, based in Liverpool, and the works included removing a 'cabaret bar' with a 'false wall' that had been installed by the Mecca company, possible in 1982 as above, and now adding a new kitchen at the back. The total cost of this refurbishment was reportedly £120,000. At this point it was advertised as "The Hippodrome Social Club".

On 6 March 1987 Manchester City Council gave Planning Permission and Listed Building Consent for an "illuminated name sign on side elevation of social club".

In March 1987 the increased number of snooker tables was promoted in the local press: "The Hulme Hippodrome Social Club now has 10 full-size tables in the snooker lounge, open daily from 11am to 10pm."

=== 1980s and 1990s – Bookings ===
On 17 October 1987 Desmond Decker and the Aces played a gig at Hulme Hippodrome, as advertised by a flyer. Around the same time there was a gig at the Hipp by Edwin Starr, and reportedly the Hipp was used for practical work by the University of Salford for students of drama and film.

On 26 February 1988 a local listing says, "Big Ed and His Rockin' Rattlesnakes are back. Tonight they appear with Edward Barton at the Hulme Hippodrome."

On 10 March 1988 The Wild Panzis, Metal Monkey Machine, Slum Turkeys, and the Tunnel Frenzies play a gig at the Hipp, as advertised by a hand-drawn small poster.

Reportedly the Hipp was a film location for an episode in a Sherlock Holmes TV series starring Edward Woodward, which was possibly, Hands of a Murderer (1990).

In an interview in 2018, Mark Kermode said:

- "If someone did a rock family tree of all the bands that didn't make it in Manchester in the 1980s, it would go on for absolute miles. One of the weird things about [this] period was, particularly in Hulme where I lived, everyone was in a band; most people were in two or three at the same time. It was all incredibly internecine. I remember being in a friend's flat in Charles Barry Crescent, and A Guy Called Gerald was down one way, and Russians Eat Bambi were down that way, and Jamie who ran The Kitchen recording studio was upstairs – it was more like a crèche for musicians than it was a housing estate at that point. So, yes, it would make a brilliant family tree but it would be so hard to unravel."

Similarly, in his book on dance music the journalist and film-maker Ed Gillett said in forthright terms:

- "From 1987 to the Hulme Crescents' demolition in 1994, The Kitchen brought together all-night ravers, post-Beanfield free party crusties, rain-sodden punks and political radicals."

From a newspaper article in 2017, Beverley Gallier, partner of the late music mogul Alan Wise, a key figure in the birth of The Haçienda and Factory Records, said:

- "My partner Alan used to use this place as a music promoter. He put some of the first punk music on in Hulme. It really has a lot of significance."

=== 1980s – two armed robberies ===
From research interviews with people associated with this group of companies working in the 1980s, there were accounts of two armed robberies for cash in the pool and snooker hall where staff were threatened including one in June 1987 where one woman was coshed and £5,000 stolen.

=== 1988 – dark for 15 years ===
It seems from the material above that the Hulme Hippodrome main auditorium and the adjacent Floral Hall function rooms had all been 'dark' for 15 years, from sometime after March 1988 to August 2003. The metal cladding was still fitted to the Hipp at this stage, and reportedly it was possible for some children to climb into the Hipp through upper windows using the void space (gap) found between the brick wall and the metal outer skin held away from the wall by supports, used here as handholds.

== 1990s – Dark and missing out on regeneration ==
Manchester is a significant case study for urban regeneration area-based programmes. Starting with the City Challenge programme for Hulme in 1992, the city has undergone extensive regeneration (USA: urban renewal) initiatives over the years, with various stakeholders, including local and central government, private investors, and community organisations working in a contested area to co-produce a plan for a revitalised city and then transform it into a vibrant and sustainable urban centre.

=== 1992 – Hulme City Challenge ===
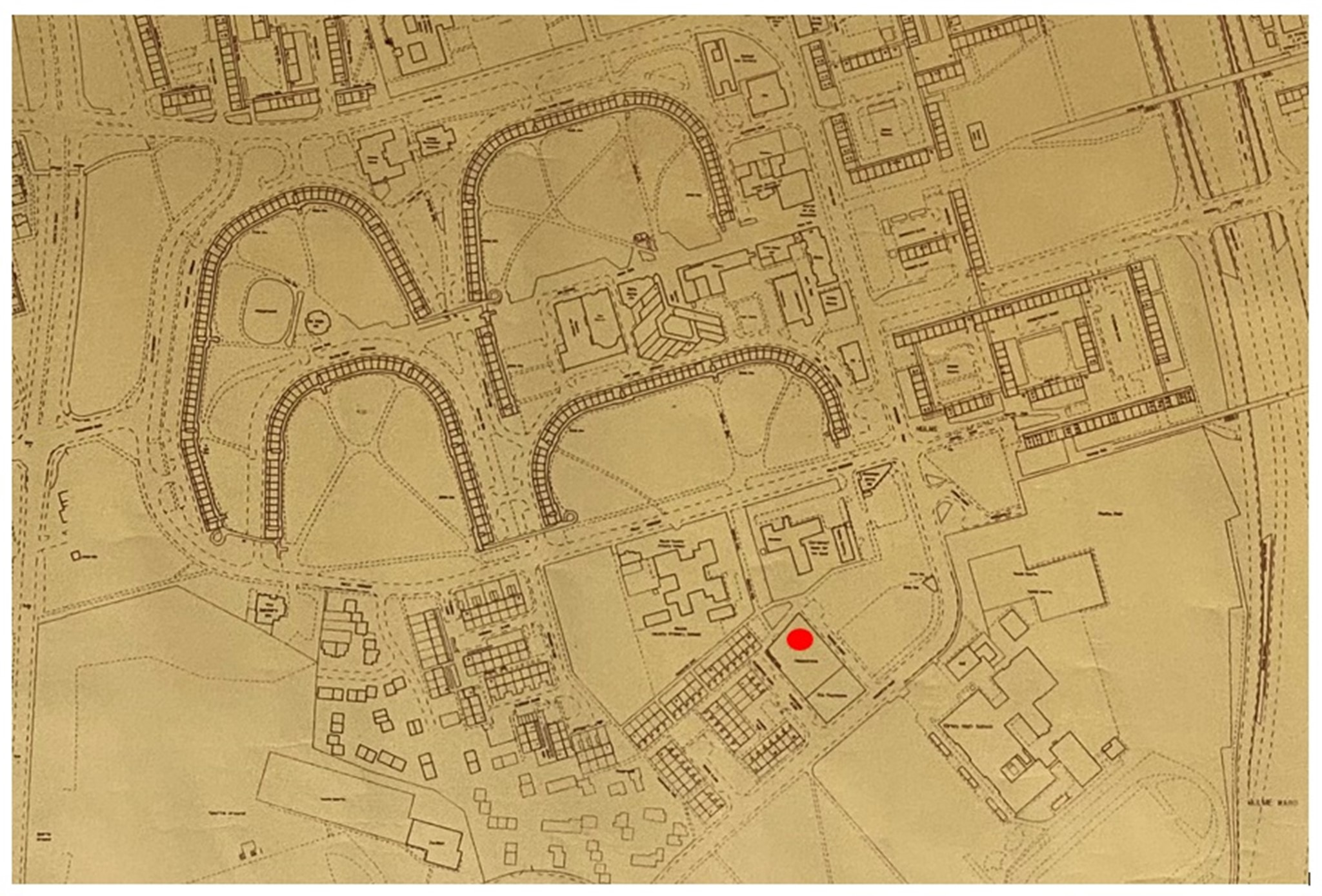
Hulme in 1992, at start of next urban regeneration programme

The City Challenge programme was announced by the UK government in May 1991 using a new competitive bidding model, where around 15 pre-selected areas would be funded if their five-year bids were judged to be worthy of funding. The programme value was £75 million a year for the five years.

In April 1992 the UK government awarded £37.5 million (all years) for the Hulme proposal made by Manchester City Council as the accountable body for the local partnership model. Manchester City Council then blended in other funding programmes (UK, EU, private and voluntary sectors) to assemble a multi-sector co-produced Moss Side & Hulme Partnership plan with £400 million to cover a footprint of 50 hectares (c. 125 acres) in the inner city. The flagship project was the demolition of the problematic Hulme Crescents and their replacement with flats and family houses.

The Moss Side and Hulme Partnership (1992-2003) was the successor to Hulme Regeneration Ltd.

=== 1992-95 – Manchester City of Drama 1994 Ltd ===
The Manchester City of Drama 1994 Ltd organisation commenced its preparatory operations in September 1992, and one of its early projects concerned Hulme Hippodrome. By February 1993 there were some initial suggestions for the organisation to buy Hulme Hippodrome as a venue for performances during 1994 and to become Manchester's only "number one touring theatre" (aka a receiving house). A budget of up to £40,000 was agreed, being £10,000 from Manchester Airport, £10,000 from Hulme Regeneration Ltd, and "up to" £20,000 from the NIA Centre based next door to the Hipp in The Playhouse theatre. A feasibility study costing £20,000 was commissioned from Boyden Southwood Associates Limited, Bristol, which was completed in August 1993. It was decided in September 1993 that "it would not be possible to progress [Hulme Hippodrome] quickly enough for City of Drama to use it as a venue next year". A later evaluation report stated that "the possibility of reopening Hulme Hippodrome ... lies with the [Manchester City Council] planners, Hulme Regeneration [Ltd] and potential private operators." A copy of this report is still being sought.

=== 1993 – URBED proposal ===
In April 1993 the URBED non-profit urban design consultancy (1976-2023) submitted a proposal to the regeneration programme team, "Bringing the Hulme Hippodrome Back to Life". This proposal was also linked to Manchester's status as City of Drama for 1994. MBL Architects who had been involved in the internal remodelling of The Playhouse for the Nia Centre were also part of the bidding team. The proposal suggests that a written brief had been issued to potential bidders.

The essence of the URBED proposal was to build a new tower on Warwick Street to be a new gateway entrance to the building, attractive from a distance, and to include some ancillary aspects in the tower such as a café and box office. This would be needed because the Hipp had "lost its original relationship to the street network" and the tower would be: "a tall lightweight structure ... linked into a new circulation route between the auditorium and the floral hall."

The bid summary was that the new tower would create: "a permanent beacon for the City of Drama, its 'Eiffel Tower' as a legacy to the city and a landmark for Hulme."

The proposal was to retain the fly tower, unlike in the recent remodelling work for the Nia Centre next door. It did identify some issues with "short term licensing and building regulation requirements".

Possibly because of these compliance issues with various regulations, and possibly because the Hipp's owners at the time maybe weren't willing to engage with the regeneration partnership and processes, the URBED proposal wasn't taken forward, however the analysis within the proposal has broadly remained relevant.

=== 1994 – Development Guide ===
The Hulme Guide to Development (June 1994) set the design principles of the 1990s urban regeneration of the area, a pioneering approach to urban design that has been much adapted by and for places elsewhere, nationally and internationally.

Hulme Hippodrome is discussed in three sections: History of Hulme, A Sense of Place, and on Landmarks.

- "A sense of place. Hulme still contains some remarkable public buildings, including the Zion Centre [Z-Arts], the Hippodrome, St Mary's Church, the North Hulme Centre, and a number of pubs." (p12).
- "Existing landmarks must be incorporated into Hulme's urban structure. Buildings such as North Hulme Centre, the Zion, St Mary's Church and the Hippodrome should be integrated into the urban fabric to serve their role as landmarks, end vistas and define important public spaces." (p27).

=== 1994 – Len Grant ===
From correspondence with Len Grant, a Manchester-based photographer specialising in documenting its regeneration: in 1994 he took a series of internal images of the auditorium which are now held in Manchester's Central Library, and it was on his own initiative rather than as a specific commission. His series of internal shots of the auditorium which are now held in Manchester's Central Library.

Probably sometime in the 1990s the building was reportedly placed on Manchester City Council's Buildings At Risk Register.

=== 1995 – David Plowright and Johnnie Hamp £10m proposal ===
There were press reports in 1995 of plans for "the restoration and re-opening of the Hulme Hippodrome [in 1996] as both a theatre and a Museum of British Music Hall" in an article by David Plowright, and "Former Granada chiefs David Plowright and Johnnie Hamp have been working on a £10m plan to bring the big names of comedy back to the 1,000 seat theatre." David Plowright had chaired the Manchester City of Drama 1994 organisation. This plan for the Hipp did not materialise. A copy of this plan is still being sought.

== 1999-2020 – church services and music gigs ==
=== 1999-2015 – Hipp in use by Gilbert Deya Ministries (religious charity) ===
Oral history reports suggest that the Gilbert Deya Ministries charity started hiring function rooms in the social club (ex Floral Hall) part of Hulme Hippodrome for services from around 1999. From details in the Land Register the building was bought from Brooks Wilkinson Ltd on 26 August 2003 for £250,000 by the Gilbert Deya Ministries (GDM) a controversial religious charity, being an unincorporated trust founded on 1 September 1995. The year following their purchase of the Hippodrome (3 February 2004) the charity gained planning permission and listed building consent from Manchester City Council for two mobile phone antennas disguised as flagpoles to be added at the top of the Warwick Street side wall.

The GDM charity has been officially investigated at least twice (2004 - 2006, and 2016 - ongoing) and possibly three times by the Charity Commission.

An evangelical church blending Christianity with some African cultures with a reported saying of "My Jesus kills witches", their services were held on the ground floor of the Floral Hall, adjacent to the main auditorium. The religious charity reportedly spent £200,000 on ad-hoc repairs to the Floral Hall portion of the building around 2015.

Following a scandal in the UK with press coverage in 2004 there was a contested and therefore delayed extradition of Gilbert Deya in August 2017 from the UK to Nairobi, Kenya to face trial on charges of child stealing. The charges were denied and the verdict on 17 July 2023 in Nairobi was of his acquittal due to insufficient evidence. From court papers, his wife Mary Deya had previously been arrested for "falsification of the [children's] birth certificates ... and pleaded guilty and [she was] sentenced to serve six months' imprisonment". From the same court papers, they reportedly divorced in 2017.

The charity has been associated with a complex cluster of short-life private companies, some with charity trustees as directors. There was a further press scandal in 2016.

Probably by September 2015 Hulme Hippodrome was no longer being used by the charity for services / events, leading up to the extradition of Gilbert Deya to Kenya in August 2017. Gilbert Deya died in a road accident in June 2025.

The contested sale of the Hipp on 25 November 2020 by some people in GDM, including a minority of trustees, to a south London property developer is detailed below. The details of the trustees of the charity were finally removed from the title deeds by the Land Registry on 31 August 2023.

=== 2004 – Bingo Jesus iconic sign ===
When the religious charity bought the building there was an existing Bingo rigid sign fixed high on the early 1970s metal cladding on the east wall facing Warwick Street. Probably in late 2003 or early 2004 based on surviving photographs, the charity fixed a banner at the same height beside that sign with the single word, Jesus. These two signs - Bingo Jesus - remained side by side until the signs were removed some years later (maybe 2007 from land charge details, or 2012), along with the underlying metal cladding, based on photographs. This combined signage became an iconic cultural reference for many people in Hulme, for example forming a permanent wall display in the Lass O'Gowrie pub (M1 7DB) and with a local psychedelic rock band naming themselves after the sign.

=== 2006-07 – Theatres at Risk registers; Theatres Trust, Historic England ===
Hulme Hippodrome has been listed in the national Theatres at Risk (TAR) Register since it was first compiled in 2006 by the Theatres Trust, a register which is updated annually.

On 4 June 2007 Manchester City Council makes their first of twelve interventions to safeguard the building citing "Dangerous Conditions" by using section 78 of the Building Act 1984. This first intervention is to "remove cladding from around the building and [remove] rendering on Warwick Street elevation." This might have prompted English Heritage (later, Historic England) to add Hulme Hippodrome to their list of theatres at risk in July 2007.

=== 2007-19 – Enforced repairs by the council, cladding and canopy removed ===
From 2007 Manchester City Council started to undertake remedial works to the building (using its section 78 powers in the Building Act 1984) which presumably the charity had declined to do, as shown in the Land Charges Register, including:

- June 2007 - to remove cladding from around building and rendering on Warwick Street elevation.
- October 2009 - to remove dangerous grills.
- November 2009 - to provide temporary fencing and remove canopy and loose glass from high-level windows.
- Spring 2014 - to add fencing and repairs to doors.
- August 2016 - to secure all the external fire exits, secure the Warwick Street entrance with two padlocks and secure the staircase to rear of ground floor hall.
- July 2019 - to secure two pairs of double doors at side of the building with steel sheets
- October 2019 - to remove rotten timbers, secure internal recess openings, to secure the property against unauthorised access, and to provide site security.

=== 2011-14 – Youth Village, music gigs ===
From early 2012 to 2014 the religious charity reportedly leased the upstairs room of the Floral Hall to a community youth group, Youth Village. Following on from the late 1980s there was a further period of music gigs at Hulme Hippodrome / Floral Hall, this time organised by the Youth Village project. For example 12 bands were listed as playing on 29 September 2012 - Trash Kit, Frazer King, Halo Halo, Poppycock, Paddy Steer, Warm Widow, Ill, Now, Salford Media City, Laser Dream Eyes, Jazzbo, and Hurt Douglas. The project's Facebook group, Hulme Hippodrome, was established in May 2012, now closed. The project held an Open Day in December 2012 for visitors to see the main auditorium as a 'hidden gem'.

=== 2012 – Attempt to upgrade the Listed Building rating to two star ===
In March 2012 a 73-page report was published that had been commissioned by English Heritage (before its reorganisation) and the Theatres Trust "to assess its significance and for reviewing the listing grading" made in 1977. In the Executive Summary (page 2) the report concluded:

- "In view of its highly decorative interior, it is recommended that the Hippodrome Theatre be considered for re-grading at Grade II* [two star]. It is also recommended, that in view of the rarity value of the two theatres to adjoin one another, that the Playhouse and Hippodrome are considered for upgrading together."

Unfortunately this recommendation for an upgrade was declined. Whether adding in the more recent research on the Hipp's national cultural significance for radio comedy in the early 1950s would have tipped the balance cannot be known.

=== c. 2015 – Section 215 Notice ===
Around 2015 Manchester City Council issued the Gilbert Deya Ministries charity a Section 215 Notice (Town and Country Planning Act 1990) to make various external improvements to the Hulme Hippodrome building, as stated in residents postings in Facebook at the time. In a newspaper report dated 4 August 2016 the charity claimed to have spent £200,000 in complying with this notice.

=== 2015 – Friends of Hulme Hippodrome & 1st ACV bid ===
Probably because the building had stopped being used by the GDM charity and was being fully neglected, the Friends of Hulme Hippodrome Facebook group (established 9 September 2015) had hoped to get the building listed as an asset of community value (ACV), which would have given the community group six months to raise the money needed to buy the building from the charity owner before it went out to general market. However the ACV application made on 29 February 2016 was turned down by Manchester City Council on 24 March 2016. A council spokesman said: "There would also be a significant cost to bring the building back into use—into the millions—and without a [business] plan in place it would be unfair for us to assume they could turn the building around."

=== 2016 – Dangerous Building, unsafe seating area ===
On 25 August 2016 a Dangerous Building notice issued by Manchester City Council was affixed to the building, dated from a contemporary photograph in Facebook. The previous day the council undertook an internal survey and recorded "Seating area within theatre appears unsafe structurally" within the statutory notice. Works done by the council were listed as, "secure all external fire exits, secure Warwick Street entrance with 2 padlocks and secure staircase to rear of ground floor" on the same date as the notice was affixed.

=== 2017-18 – Squatters ===
Squatters occupied the Hulme Hippodrome from around 28 May 2017 to around 19 February 2018, and used the venue for music gigs until the Greater Manchester Fire and Rescue Service issued Prohibition Notices in October 2017 and on 9 February 2018 against holding public events on the basis of inadequate means of escape for the audience. A court hearing concerning the enforcement of an eviction notice issued by the Gilbert Deya Ministries charity was held on 22 January 2018.

The squatters had occupied the Hulme Hippodrome saying they intended to bring it back into community use, and reportedly cleaning it up after years of neglect, though other accounts differ, including those of a community campaign to end the parties, which reportedly organised against them using the Friends of Hulme Hippodrome group on Facebook. However, from reports in the same group, during the initial weeks of the squat there were amicable 'tea and chat' events under gazebos outside the Hipp to talk with local residents.

On 18 February 2018 one of the 'squat parties' which included the bands: Yo Dynamo, I am six, and Denim & Leather; was video recorded by Paranoid Pictures. One report in a residents Facebook group describes this as the 'End of Squat' party which it reports ended in violent disorder.

A video about the squatting events called Occupying the Hulme Hippodrome was made by 'vj decoder'.

On 27 July 2019 Manchester City Council added a statutory notice to say, "Emergency call out: squatters have removed existing board up and have entered the building" and as a result undertook urgent works to "secure two pairs of double doors at side of building with steel sheets."

=== 2019 – Victorian Society ===
On 13 September 2019 the Hulme Hippodrome was named on the Victorian Society's list of the top ten most endangered buildings in England and Wales.

On 25 October 2019 Manchester City Council did further work to keep the building safe, which was to "remove rotten timbers, secure internal recess openings and secure property against unauthorised access".

=== Niamos, in The Playhouse next door ===
1955 - The Playhouse was sold by Brennan's Cinemas Limited to the BBC on 19 December 1955, this section being from Land Registry records.

The Playhouse was used initially as a TV and radio studio, but in its later years with the BBC it was only used for music rehearsals and for radio broadcasts. This was perhaps because BBC TV transitioned from black & white (monochrome) to colour broadcasts between July 1967 and 1969; and possibly the equipment at The Playhouse wasn't modernised from the old 405-lines format to the higher-definition 625-lines format thus explaining why TV recordings there were ended in the 1960s although radio recordings continued. Also, in 1967 the BBC acquired a large site nearby (1.5 km) on Oxford Road in Manchester and started to build New Broadcasting House, a major TV studios complex for the north of England that operated from 1976 to 2012.

1989 - It was sold by the BBC to the NIA Cultural Centre Ltd, (c/o Abasindi Co-operative, St Mary's Street, M15 5WA) for £50,000 on 22 September 1989.

1999 - The next owner was Northern Estates (Manchester) Limited, (Norbuck House, Buckhurst Road, Levenshulme, M19 2DS) who bought The Playhouse on 1 February 1999. The purchase was made by paying £65,000 to the Royal Bank of Scotland to repay a mortgage charge. During part of this period The Playhouse was tenanted by a religious group, the Fountain Gate Chapel.

2017 - The Playhouse was sold (at an auction on 18 May 2017 at the Macron Stadium, Bolton, for £325,000) and the property title was transferred in the Land Registry records on 15 June 2017. The ownership transferred from Northern Estates to GLC Estates Ltd. The Playhouse had been known as the NIA Centre (1991-1997) and currently is tenanted by and known as Niamos, a non-profit community organisation.

== Some common myths and inaccuracies ==
(A) Although Stan Laurel did appear at the Hipp around 1910, there are some incorrect reports of Laurel and Hardy appearing together in later years at Hulme Hippodrome. Laurel and Hardy did appear together on stage at four venues near to Hulme Hippodrome. The confusion might arise from their appearance at the similar-sounding Manchester Hippodrome in 1953. Details are:

1. New Oxford Picture House, Oxford Street (demolished 2017) on 2 August 1932;
2. Palace Theatre, Oxford Road, from 21 July 1947 for two weeks;
3. Salford Opera House; and
4. New Manchester Hippodrome Theatre, Ardwick Green (demolished 1964) on 2 November 1953, part of their final UK tour, Birds of a Feather.

(B) Some incorrect reports have Nina Simone playing at the Hulme Hippodrome, whereas she appeared next door in The Playhouse at an opening event of the NIA Centre on 2 May 1991.

=== Secret tunnel ===
(C) There were local stories of a 'secret tunnel' for artists to escape the crowds outside by going from the Hulme Hippodrome to nearby lodgings in the Junction Hotel, a pub with rooms. Some stories were that this tunnel reached further to the city centre. More recent reports indicate that there probably was a Victorian storm drain at sub-basement level with an unconfirmed doorway from the Hulme Hippodrome basement toilets, and the internal height of this drain and their form as a neighbourhood network might have led to the idea of them as a means of escape.

(D) Some rock and roll, skiffle, and other musical acts reportedly played at the Hulme Hippodrome, however the listings included some confusion between Hulme Hipp and the Manchester Hippodrome. In particular, The Quarrymen (aka Johnny and the Moondogs in 1959; later, The Beatles), reportedly played at Hulme Hipp on 15 November 1959 but this was the regional final of a TV talent show at the (New) Manchester Hippodrome in Ardwick Green, and not Hulme Hippodrome. Another source claims for this date: "As Johnny and the Moondogs, Lennon, McCartney and Harrison reach the final audition stage of Carroll Levis's TV Star Search [a talent programme made by the ABC commercial TV company] at the Empire Theatre, Liverpool." However, it seems that it was the preliminary auditions that were held at the Liverpool Empire on three dates in October, and it was the regional final that was held on 15 November 1959 in Manchester. There are reports that the three young musicians, at this point working as guitarists without a drummer, could not afford lodgings for the night so they had to return to Liverpool before they could be called back to the stage for the final votes which were based on the level of audience applause.

=== "Manchester Hippodrome" ambiguities ===
(E) In some research materials there can be some confusion between the Hulme Hippodrome and the two versions of Manchester Hippodrome. Working with the theatre architect Frank Matcham, Oswald Stoll opened two new performance venues in Manchester in 1904:

1. Manchester Hippodrome (1904-1935) on Oxford Street. The site was subsequently the Gaumont cinema and Rotters night club, and currently is an NCP car park.
2. Ardwick Empire (1904-1964) which was renamed the New Manchester Hippodrome Theatre when the 'old' one on Oxford Street closed in 1935. The 'new' one was at the junction of Higher Ardwick with Hyde Road. It was closed in 1961, demolished in 1964, and is currently a surface car park. After the 1930s reportedly it was used flexibly as both a cinema and for staged shows.

== 2020-2023 – Contested ownership ==
The property title is freehold and absolute. Up to January 2021 the property was listed with three GDM named trustees as proprietors. GDM was an unincorporated body with a trust deed. From January 2021 to August 2023 the property had the same three trustees in the titles deeds, but their ownership was in trust, and the property developer was listed as the beneficial owner, supported by the inclusion of a Unilateral Notice.

In summary, the property timeline for 2020-2023 was:

- 25 November 2020 - Contract for Sale made, in a way that was irregular in terms of the Charities Act.
- 11 January 2021 - Application signed to transfer the title deeds to the property developer, but Land Registry start to investigate.
- 10 February 2021 - Attempted auction of the property was abandoned.
- 10 February 2021 - The Charity Commission freeze the funds received from selling the Hipp, some is already unaccounted for.
- 2 September 2021 - The Charity Commission unfreeze the remaining funds but pass them to the interim managers.
- 30 September 2021 - Land Registry refuse the application for a transfer following an investigation.
- 12 October 2022 - The Charity Commission issues a section 69 order to force the transfer to the property developer.
- 31 August 2023 - The Land Registry transfers the title deeds to the property developer.

=== Contract for sale, November 2020 ===
Self-reportedly on 25 November 2020 a private individual who is a property developer and a disqualified director based in south London reportedly paid £450,000 to solicitors representing two persons claiming to be Gilbert Deya Ministries (GDM) charity trustees authorised to sell Hulme Hippodrome, by an exchange of a contract of sale or a purported contract of sale to be followed shortly by completion.

One of these two people was a named trustee in the title deeds, the second person was not, and no evidence was presented to show the consent of the sale by the other two named trustees in the title deeds. A transcribed audio-recorded meeting on 29 January 2021 included one of the other named trustees in the title deeds stating their non-consent to the sale. The third named trustee is understood to have moved residence out of the UK some years ago, GDM describing them as "retired" and records indicating a date of birth in 1948.

=== Attempted auction of the Hipp ===
The property developer attempted to sell Hulme Hippodrome at an online auction on 10 February 2021, being advertised as potentially suitable for redevelopment into apartments (contrary to the Planning Act as a listed building) with a guide price of £950,000. Within days of discovering the auction notice, the campaign Save Hulme Hippodrome (SHH) was created by concerned people from the community with the goal of bringing Hulme Hippodrome into community ownership in order to restore it as a community resource. The building was withdrawn from the auction following the first phase of campaigning, along with formal representations by the Theatres Trust and Manchester City Council to the auction house.

=== Transfer of proprietorship refused by the Land Registry in 2021 ===
On 11 January 2021 in the post-completion phase of the conveyancing of the property, the developer's solicitors attempted to register the sale with a transfer of ownership details at the Land Registry (form TR1), which the Land Registrar declined to accept due to apparent irregularities both with the charity's lack of probity and governance (as sellers) and within a related TR1 attempted transfer (as buyers). The property developer had attempted a further onward transfer of ownership from themselves to a new company HHM 20 Ltd on the same date (using a second TR1 form) with a stated value now at £600,000. (This second transfer cannot take effect until the first transfer has been accepted.) An appeal period was allowed by the Land Registry until 30 September 2021, and after considering some correspondence from the developer the decision by the Land Registry was confirmed - they rejected the first TR1 because the purported conveyance was void.

On the same date the Charity Commission stated, "Despite the failure by the charity to comply with some of the statutory requirements, the sale was valid as a result of the saving provisions in the Charities Act 2011." (by email, 30 September 2021).

=== Charity Commission freezes Hipp sale funds (section 76) ===
On 10 February 2021 the Charity Commission wrote to the conveyancing solicitors of GDM in order to freeze the money they were holding as clients funds from the sale of the Hipp. This was a section 76 order, and it stated that the frozen funds were £375,060-72p. With a reported sale price by solicitors to the Land Registry of £450,000 this suggests that around £75,000 had been withdrawn between November 2020 and February 2021, payments which will have included the 12 Specific Financial Charges registered by Manchester City Council for works undertaken to keep the building safe between June 2007 and October 2019.

On 2 September 2021 the solicitors were further instructed by the Charity Commission to 'unfreeze' the funds and to pay the remaining amount directly to the Interim Managers appointed by the Charity Commission, not to the charity trustees (by a further section 76 order).

=== Independent valuation ===
In August 2021 the campaign group Save Hulme Hippodrome commissioned an independent RICS compliant valuation of the building which has been shared with the authorities.

=== Charity Commission asks Land Registry to transfer Hipp to property developer (section 69) ===
On 12 October 2022 the Charity Commission issued a section 69 notice (Charities Act 2011) to the Land Registry seeking to remove any residual interest in the property by the charity and for a transfer of Hulme Hippodrome's ownership to the named private individual property developer.

=== Illegal use prevented ===
On 2 November 2022 the Greater Manchester Police service disrupted the installation of equipment in the basement intended for a cannabis farm, along with dangerous digging sideways under the pavement in Warwick Street to access high voltage cables. The value of the equipment seized was reported to be around £40,000.

=== The January 2021 first transfer of proprietorship completes in August 2023 ===
In the week commencing 24 July 2023 the Land Registry wrote to the solicitors of the Gilbert Deya Ministries charity asking for any objections before they enact a transfer notice issued by the charity's Interim Managers appointed by the Charity Commission to transfer Hulme Hippodrome to the property developer. This was a standard anti-fraud precautionary letter. On 31 August 2023 the property was finally transferred to the property developer with absolute title.

The last Specific Financial Charge registered against the property which was paid off by the proceeds of the sale in 2020 was a charge made for works on 25 October 2019. There have been a number of similar interventions by Manchester City Council since that date including re-securing forced entrances by covering them with sheets of perforated steel, charges which will be reimbursed by the proceeds of the next sale.

=== The January 2021 second transfer of proprietorship to HHM 20 Ltd begins in June 2024 ===
On 14 June 2024 an application was made to the Land Registry to change the named owner of the property from the private developer to the HHM 20 Ltd company (number 12917823) with a service address of Harson Estates Ltd, 291a Northborough Road, London SW16 4TR. This application included a further TR1 dated 4 April 2024 as a "confirmatory transfer". The application includes a request to remove the historical charity-related restrictions from the title deeds.

After investigations etc lasting over three years, in August 2024 the TR1 for HHM 20 Ltd was accepted by the Land Registry and the company was listed in the title deeds as the proprietor of Hulme Hippodrome.

== 2021 – The Save Hulme Hippodrome campaign starts ==
The SHH campaign started in January 2021 when the community became aware of the plans to sell the Hipp at an auction based in London, being advertised as suitable for apartments. The SHH campaign became a non-profit limited company in March 2021. The campaign's Facebook page has over 600 followers, there is regular use of social media and an Information Bulletin is produced for supporters and stakeholders. The activities include a heritage project with older supporters who recall visiting the Hipp as children in the 1950s, and extensive legal consultations and investigations.

=== Student placements and projects ===
The campaign group has worked with first degree architecture, drama and event management students, with a postgraduate heritage researcher, and with university teaching staff on a funded oral histories project with former residents of Hulme who were mass-displaced from the area in the 1960s.

In the spring of 2022 a group of students in the MSA Live 2022 course event at the Manchester School of Architecture (MSA) hand-made a detailed 1:100 wooden scale model of Hulme Hippodrome and Playhouse, bisected to show the interior layout of the two auditoriums and the Floral Hall, along with digital images of various potential future uses. One suggestion by the MSA students was to consider adding a flattened dome across the entire roof space to better drain the volumes of rainwater from the complex roof form with its many galleys and channels. The model was the centrepiece of an exhibition (2022-2023) about the Hipp at Manchester Central Library.

In the spring of 2024 there were four student projects associated with the Hipp:

- An MSA Live 2024 project of student architects
- A University of Manchester Film Studies student project making a 15-minute short film on the Hipp.
- A MMU Events Management student project to run two public events about the Hipp.
- Early discussions with MMU Early Years and Childhood Studies tutors and students on possible project designs.

=== Community engagement ===
An unusual aspect of the community engagement required in order to save this heritage building is that the older members of the community were all dispersed and disconnected from the area in the clearances during the 1960s, and such people report how it has taken decades to find the community connections with their neighbours and classmates again.

There have been nine events held to date. During the first year in 2021 the campaign held four events (3 July, 18 July, 4 Sept, 7 Oct) including community festivals with stalls, performances, and presentations of updates to supporters and an evening street party on Warwick Street to celebrate the building's 120th anniversary (7 Oct 2021), including a projection of short films on the east wall.

A Spring Festival was held by the campaign group on 6 March 2022. Further photographs were taken inside the building in 2021 by 'urban explorers'. Later in 2022 there was a launch event at Manchester Central Library (1 Nov) for an 8-month exhibition including displaying the scale model made by MSA students and other memorabilia, running to July 2023.

Events in 2023 have been scheduled for / delivered on 29 April, 20 May, 8 July and 9 November. In addition, presentations are being made and offered to the staff and committees of community-based organisations in the neighbourhood.

A regular Information Bulletin is produced by the campaign, for which supporters can freely register, averaging around 30 editions a year.

=== Cultural heritage ===
The campaign has a cultural heritage programme containing three main projects, and some of the results of these projects are summarised above:

1. Recording oral histories from current and former residents of Hulme who remember visiting the Hipp from the 1950s to the 2010s.
2. Visiting the formal and informal archives of various organisations for their traces of the history of the Hipp.
3. Desk and library research including historic images, source books, and contemporary newspaper accounts.

=== Internal conditions ===
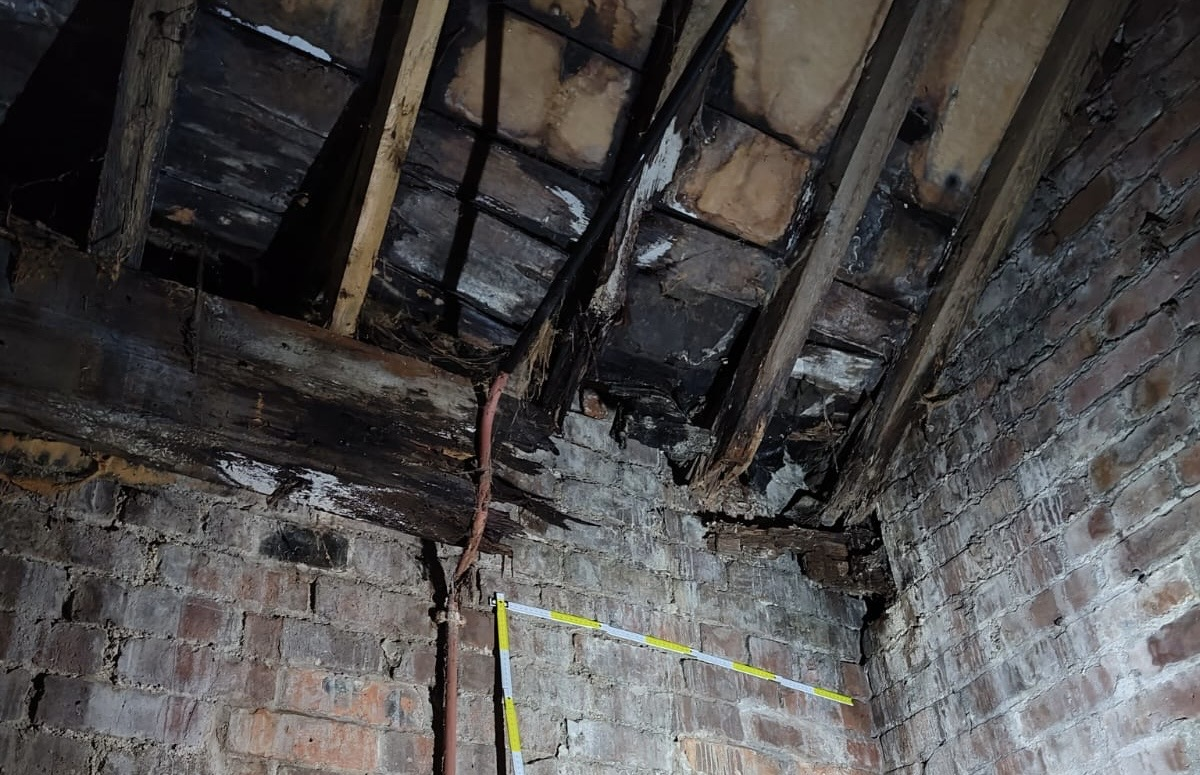
Wet rot in the roof timbers at the party wall, Nov 2023

Public access to the shuttered building has not been possible since around 2016. There is known rainwater ingress through holes in the roof and as a result of blocked downpipes and drainage. Previous visitors have reported some unsafe areas within parts of the building such as some of the wooden floors and stairways not bearing weight, probably due to patches of wet rot. Pigeon infestation has been observed from the exterior. Filmed visual surveys of the roof by drones commissioned by the campaign in March 2021 and December 2022 have shown multiple holes in the roof, and the continuing deterioration with an estimated 23 holes and openings in the roof in the later inspection. An inspection in November 2023 inside The Playhouse next door showed wet rot in roof timbers at the party wall junction with Hulme Hippodrome, with a loss of 80 cm as shown on the photograph here.

=== 2021 - 2nd ACV bid (asset of community value) ===
On 12 February 2021 the SHH campaign group made an application to Manchester City Council (MCC) to have Hulme Hippodrome listed as an Asset of Community Value, under section 88 of the Localism Act 2011. A similar bid by the previous campaigning Friends Group in 2016 had been unsuccessful. Following correspondence and checks the bid was accepted as valid on 25 June 2021, and after correspondence in July 2021 with the owner's lawyers the listing was approved by MCC on 17 August 2021. However the lawyers made further representations to MCC in November 2021 for a 'review' and the listing was withdrawn on 9 February 2022.

=== 2022 - 2nd Section 215 Disamenity Notice ===
Following on from the first Section 215 Disamenity Notice (Planning Act) issued around 2015, on 14 February 2022 Manchester City Council served a second Section 215 Disamenity Notice to all the alleged owners for 11 types of external remedial works, which was appealed by one of the alleged owners at Manchester Magistrates Court on 29 July 2022 and the Notice was held in abeyance pending a full hearing on 12 January 2023. The appeal by the property developer was dismissed by the court after a variation of the disamenity notice was agreed between the parties for 7 types of external remedial works to the disamenity or 'eyesores', and the property developer had to pay the legal costs of the council.

The publicly-issued revised Notice sets out a staged timetable (3, 6 and 18 months) requiring the following works to be done:

- remove vegetation
- repair leaks in gutters, downpipes etc
- remove green mould
- remove or cover graffiti, but not public art
- close up all window openings
- replace broken glass in windows
- replace missing brickwork.

In planning law these external improvements are not called "repairs" because a formal Repairs Notice served in the owner of a building can be much more wide-ranging, structural and detailed in scope and can be much more expensive to follow than external improvements to the look or amenity of a building.

The continuing issue of holes in the roof remains a major concern to the Save Hulme Hippodrome campaign, which may qualify as 'urgent works'.

=== 2023 - Junction Green masterplan consultation ===
In May 2023 the Save Hulme Hippodrome Ltd campaign produced an outline masterplan for the area around Hulme Hippodrome for consultation. In summary, the incoherent street layout from the 1960s is resolved into a linear series of three pocket parks (920, 520 & 630 m2). The Junction Green area is around 2.6 hectares (6.4 acres) bounded by Rolls Crescent, Old Birley Street, Chichester Road, Wilberforce Close and Rolls Crescent Primary School. It includes the Hulme Community Garden Centre, Niamos, Claremont elderly care centre, the Hulme Centre events venue, and two significant derelict heritage buildings - the Junction Hotel pub, and the Hulme Hippodrome and Playhouse theatres complex. A full survey of underground utilities was undertaken. This masterplan was the subject of a community engagement event held in Hulme Community Garden Centre on 29 April 2023.

In April 2026 the campaign to save the theatre was the subject of an extended article in The Guardian newspaper, 3500 words long.

== See also ==
- Listed buildings in Manchester-M15
