= List of British comedians =

British people who perform comedy

This is a list of comedians of British birth or famous mainly in Britain. Many of the comedy panel-game regulars and sitcom actors may not be regarded as comedians by some people but they are included here because this page uses the word "comedian" in its broadest possible sense. Fictional comedians are not included.

== Impressionists ==
- Terry Alderton (born 1970), Spitting Image
- Ronni Ancona (born 1966), Alistair McGowan's Big Impression
- Chris Barrie (born 1960), Spitting Image
- Stanley Baxter (1926–2025)
- Rory Bremner (born 1961)
- Faith Brown (born 1944)
- Rob Brydon (born 1965)
- Paul Burling (born 1969)
- Brian Conley (born 1961), Alive and Dangerous
- Kevin Connelly, Dead Ringers
- Phil Cool (born 1948)
- Jon Culshaw (born 1968), Dead Ringers, 2DTV
- Bobby Davro (born 1958)
- Dawn French (born 1957), French and Saunders
- Matt Forde (born 1982)
- Peter Goodwright (1936–2020)
- Mike Hayley
- Dave Lamb, 2DTV, Goodness Gracious Me
- Alistair McGowan (born 1964), Alistair McGowan's Big Impression
- Mark Perry, Dead Ringers, 2DTV
- Jan Ravens (born 1958), Dead Ringers, 2DTV
- Morgana Robinson (born 1982), The Morgana Show
- Jennifer Saunders (born 1958), French and Saunders
- Peter Serafinowicz
- John Sessions (1953–2020)
- Debra Stephenson (born 1972), The Impressions Show with Culshaw and Stephenson
- Tracey Ullman (born 1959)
- Mike Yarwood (1941–2023)

== Musical comedians ==
- Adèle Anderson (born 1952)
- Bill Bailey (born 1965)
- Les Barker (1947–2023)
- Mitch Benn (born 1970)
- Ivor Biggun, pseudonym of Doc Cox (born 1946)
- Harriet Braine
- Simon Brint (1950–2011), comic and composer of themes for numerous TV programmes
- Doc Brown (born 1980)
- Alex Horne (born 1978)
- Adam Buxton (born 1969), radio host and television/sketch comedy personality
- Jasper Carrott (born 1945)
- Edwyn Collins (born 1959), writer and performer on Channel 4's West Heath House and West Heath Yard
- Billy Connolly (born 1942)
- Bernard Cribbins (1928–2022)
- Ivor Cutler (1923–2006)
- Angus Deayton (born 1956), member of The Hee Bee Gee Bees
- Richard Digance (born 1949)
- Adrian Edmondson (born 1957)
- Graham Fellows, aka John Shuttleworth (born 1959)
- Noel Fielding (born 1973)
- Flanders and Swann (Michael Flanders 1922–1975; Donald Swann 1923–1994)
- Flo and Joan
- Jay Foreman
- Boothby Graffoe (born 1962)
- John Hegley (born 1953), also performs as half of the Popticians
- Rainer Hersch
- Hinge and Bracket
- Neil Innes (1944–2019)
- Sid Kipper (born Chris Sugden in 1952), also performed as half of the Kipper Family
- Andrew Lawrence
- Gary Le Strange, aka Waen Shepherd (born 1971)
- Tim Minchin (born 1975)
- Bill Oddie (1941–2026)
- Earl Okin (born 1947)
- Kev Orkian (born 1974)
- Mike Harding (born 1944)
- Rachel Parris (born 1984)
- Philip Pope, comic actor and composer of TV theme tunes
- Rowland Rivron (born 1958), drummer in comedy band Raw Sex and presenter of BBC Radio 2's Jammin
- Chris Sievey, aka Frank Sidebottom (1955–2010)
- Vivian Stanshall (1943–1995)
- Jim Tavaré (born 1963)
- Jake Thackray (1938–2002)
- Victoria Wood (1953–2016)

== Variety and music hall comedians ==
- Chesney Allen (1893–1982)
- Arthur Askey (1900–1982)
- Charles Austin (1878–1942)
- Hylda Baker (1905–1986)
- Michael Barrymore (born 1952)
- George Beauchamp (1862–1900)
- Harry Bedford (1873–1939)
- Billy Bennett (1887–1942)
- Issy Bonn (1903–1977)
- Max Bygraves (1922–2012)
- Frank Carson (1926–2012)
- Billy Caryll and Hilda Mundy
- Roy Castle (1932–1994)
- Clapham and Dwyer
- Collinson and Dean
- Tommy Cooper (1921–1984)
- Tom Costello (1863–1943)
- Jimmy Cricket (1945–2026)
- Leslie Crowther (1933–1996)
- Billy Danvers (1886–1964)
- Les Dawson (1931–1993)
- Ken Dodd (1927–2018)
- Charlie Drake (1925–2006)
- Dick Emery (1915–1983)
- Will Evans (1866–1931)
- Fayne and Evans
- Sid Field (1904–1950)
- Bud Flanagan (1896–1968)
- Cyril Fletcher (1913–2005)
- George Formby (1904–1961)
- Bruce Forsyth (1928–2017)
- Ken Goodwin (1933–2012)
- Haver and Lee
- Arthur Haynes (1914–1966)
- Dick Henderson (1891–1958)
- Dickie Henderson (1922–1985)
- Frankie Howerd (1917–1992)
- Roy Hudd (1936–2020)
- Rex Jameson ("Mrs Shufflewick") (1924–1983)
- Yootha Joyce (1927–1980)
- Jimmy James (1892–1965)
- Kenway and Young
- Jimmy Learmouth (1888–1921)
- Ray Martine (1928–2002)
- Bill Maynard (1928–2018)
- Max Miller (1894–1963)
- Spike Milligan (1918–2002)
- Nat Mills and Bobbie
- Bob Monkhouse (1928–2003)
- Morecambe and Wise (Eric Morecambe 1926–1984; Ernie Wise 1925–1999)
- Dave Morris (1896–1960)
- Murray and Mooney
- Des O'Connor (1932–2020)
- Tom O'Connor (1939–2021)
- Edmund Payne (1863–1914)
- Frank Randle (1901–1957)
- Revnell and West
- Ted Rogers (1935–2001)
- George Roper (1934–2003)
- Billy Russell (1893–1971)
- Suzette Tarri (1881–1955)
- Tommy Trinder (1908–1989)
- Vesta Victoria (1873–1951)
- Max Wall (1908–1990)
- Elsie and Doris Waters
- Jimmy Wheeler (1910–1973)
- Charlie Williams (1927–2006)
- Robb Wilton (1881–1957)
- Wee Georgie Wood (1894–1979)

== Radio comedians ==
- Michael Bentine (1922–1996), The Goon Show
- Dick Bentley (1907–1995), Take It From Here
- Tim Brooke-Taylor (1940–2020), I'm Sorry, I'll Read That Again, I'm Sorry I Haven't a Clue
- John Cleese (born 1939), I'm Sorry, I'll Read That Again
- Jenny Eclair (born 1960)
- Jimmy Edwards (1920–1988), Take It From Here
- Kenny Everett (1944–1995)
- Graham Fellows (born 1959), plays the characters Jilted John, John Shuttleworth and Brian Appleton
- John Finnemore (born 1977), Cabin Pressure, John Finnemore's Souvenir Programme
- Cyril Fletcher (1913–2005)
- Ronald Frankau (1894–1951)
- Graeme Garden (born 1943), I'm Sorry, I'll Read That Again, I'm Sorry I Haven't a Clue
- Jeff Green (born 1964)
- Joyce Grenfell (1910–1979)
- Deryck Guyler (1914–1999)
- Tony Hancock (1924–1968), Hancock's Half Hour
- Tommy Handley (1892–1949), It's That Man Again
- David Hatch (1939–2007), I'm Sorry, I'll Read That Again
- Leonard Henry (1890–1973)
- Jon Holmes (born 1973), Listen Against, The Now Show
- Kenneth Horne (1907–1969), Round the Horne, Beyond Our Ken
- Roy Hudd (1936–2020), The News Huddlines
- Jo Kendall (1938–2022), I'm Sorry, I'll Read That Again, I'm Sorry I Haven't a Clue
- Harry Korris (1891–1971)
- Bill Kerr (1922–2014), Hancock's Half Hour
- Victor Lewis-Smith (1959–2022), Loose Ends
- Betty Marsden (1919–1998)
- Spike Milligan (1918–2002), The Goon Show
- Robert Moreton (1922–1957)
- Chris Morris (born 1962), On the Hour
- Richard Murdoch (1907–1990), Much-Binding-in-the-Marsh
- Stephen Murray (1912–1983), The Navy Lark
- Joy Nichols (1925–1992), Take It From Here
- Bill Oddie (1941–2026), I'm Sorry, I'll Read That Again
- Hugh Paddick (1915–2000)
- Bill Pertwee (1926–2013), Beyond Our Ken, Round the Horne
- Jon Pertwee (1919–1996), The Navy Lark
- Leslie Phillips (1924–2022), The Navy Lark
- Dennis Price (1915–1973), The Navy Lark
- Ted Ray (1905–1977), Meet Me Tonight, Carry On Teacher
- Al Read (1909–1987)
- Peter Sallis (1921–2017), Living With Betty
- Harry Secombe (1921–2001), The Goon Show
- Peter Sellers (1925–1980), The Goon Show
- Mark Steel (born 1960), The Mark Steel Solution, The Mark Steel Revolution, The Mark Steel Lectures
- Kenneth Williams (1926–1988), Round the Horne

== Satirists ==
- Douglas Adams (1952–2001)
- Michael "Atters" Attree (born 1965)
- Ikenna Azuike (born 1979)
- John Bird (1936–2022), Bremner, Bird and Fortune
- Eleanor Bron (born 1938)
- Munya Chawawa (born 1992)
- Peter Cook (1937–1995)
- John Fortune (1939–2013), Bremner, Bird and Fortune
- Ian Hislop (born 1960), Private Eye
- Jon Holmes (born 1973)
- Rosie Holt
- Armando Iannucci (born 1963)
- Nish Kumar, The Mash Report, Hello America
- Victor Lewis-Smith (1959–2022), Inside Victor Lewis-Smith
- Chris Morris (born 1962), Brass Eye
- John Oliver (born 1977), Last Week Tonight with John Oliver
- William Rushton (1937–1996)
- Michael Spicer
- Mark Thomas (born 1963), The Mark Thomas Comedy Product
- Tom Walker, "Jonathan Pie"
- Andy Zaltzman (born 1974)

== Comedy panel game regulars ==
=== A ===
- James Acaster, Russell Howard's Good News Extra, Dave's One Night Stand, QI, Would I Lie To You?, As Yet Untitled, Big Fat Quiz
- Maisie Adam, Mock the Week, QI, Have I Got News for You
- Chris Addison, Mock the Week
- Ray Alan, Blankety Blank
- Simon Amstell, Never Mind the Buzzcocks, Popworld
- Clive Anderson, Have I Got News for You, QI
- Arthur Askey, Blankety Blank
- Richard Ayoade, The IT Crowd, The Mighty Boosh, Nathan Barley, As Yet Untitled, Big Fat Quiz

=== B ===
- Bill Bailey, Never Mind the Buzzcocks, Space Cadets, QI, Would I Lie To You?
- Angela Barnes, Mock the Week, As Yet Untitled
- Michael Barrymore, Blankety Blank, The Generation Game
- Lennie Bennett, Blankety Blank, Celebrity Squares, You Bet!
- Stan Boardman, Blankety Blank
- Frankie Boyle, Mock the Week, Argumental, QI, Would I Lie to You?
- Jo Brand, QI, Have I Got News for You, Would I Lie To You?, As Yet Untitled
- Russell Brand, The Big Fat Quiz of the Year
- Jen Brister, QI, Mock the Week
- Rory Bremner, Mock the Week, Whose Line Is It Anyway?
- Kevin Bridges, Stand Up for the Week, Michael McIntyre's Comedy Roadshow
- Marcus Brigstocke, Argumental, QI, As Yet Untitled
- Tim Brooke-Taylor, I'm Sorry I Haven't a Clue
- Faith Brown, Blankety Blank
- Janet Brown, Blankety Blank
- Rob Brydon, QI, Rob Brydon's Annually Retentive, The Big Fat Quiz of the Year, Would I Lie to You?

=== C ===
- Marti Caine, Blankety Blank
- Susan Calman, The News Quiz
- Judy Carne, Blankety Blank
- Alan Carr, The Sunday Night Project, The Friday Night Project, Alan Carr's Celebrity Ding Dong, Alan Carr: Chatty Man
- Jimmy Carr, 8 Out of 10 Cats, Distraction, QI, The Big Fat Quiz of the Year
- Frank Carson, Blankety Blank
- Craig Charles, Space Cadets
- Paul Chowdhry, 8 Out of 10 Cats, Live at the Apollo, Stand Up for the Week
- Bernie Clifton, Blankety Blank
- Norman Collier, Blankety Blank
- Daisy May Cooper, 8 Out of 10 Cats, Would I Lie to You?
- David Copperfield (comedian), Blankety Blank
- Alan Coren, The News Quiz, Call My Bluff
- Leslie Crowther, Blankety Blank
- Barry Cryer, I'm Sorry I Haven't a Clue

=== D ===
- Billy Dainty, Blankety Blank
- Jim Davidson, Blankety Blank
- Alan Davies, QI, As Yet Untitled, Big Fat Quiz, Would I Lie To You?
- Windsor Davies, Blankety Blank
- Bobby Davro, Blankety Blank
- Les Dawson, TV comic
- Angus Deayton, Would I Lie to You?, former chair of Have I Got News for You
- Jack Dee, It's Only TV...but I Like It, The Big Fat Quiz of the Year, I'm Sorry I haven't a Clue
- Hugh Dennis, Mock the Week
- Omid Djalili
- Ken Dodd, Blankety Blank

=== E ===
- Harry Enfield, Harry Enfield's Television Programme
- Arthur English, Blankety Blank
- Kenny Everett, Blankety Blank

=== F ===
- Noel Fielding, The Mighty Boosh, Never Mind the Buzzcocks, The Big Fat Quiz of the Year, The IT Crowd, Unnatural Acts, Nathan Barley
- Micky Flanagan, Mock The Week, Epic Win, 8 Out of 10 Cats, Was It Something I Said?
- Cyril Fletcher, Blankety Blank
- Stu Francis, Blankety Blank
- Clement Freud, Just a Minute
- Stephen Fry, QI, Fry and Laurie, Blackadder

=== G ===
- Graeme Garden, I'm Sorry I Haven't a Clue
- Dustin Gee, Blankety Blank
- Kerry Godliman, Mock the Week
- Dave Gorman, Rob Brydon's Annually Retentive, QI, Modern Life is Goodish
- Larry Grayson, Blankety Blank
- Jeff Green, Shoot the Messenger, Jo Brand's Hot Potatoes

=== H ===
- Terry Hall (ventriloquist), Blankety Blank
- Andy Hamilton, The News Quiz, Have I Got News for You, QI
- Nick Hancock (born 1962), They Think It's All Over
- Jeremy Hardy, The News Quiz, If I Ruled the World, QI
- Keith Harris (ventriloquist), Blankety Blank
- Rolf Harris, Blankety Blank
- Tony Hawks, I'm Sorry I Haven't a Clue
- Dickie Henderson, Blankety Blank
- Richard Herring, The 99p Challenge
- Ian Hislop, The News Quiz, Have I Got News for You
- Simon Hoggart, The News Quiz
- Rufus Hound, Argumental
- Russell Howard, Mock the Week, Russell Howard's Good News, The Russell Howard Hour
- Roy Hudd, Blankety Blank
- Lee Hurst, They Think It's All Over

=== I ===
- Richard Ingrams, The News Quiz
- John Inman, Blankety Blank

=== J ===
- Elis James, As Yet Untitled
- Milton Jones, Mock The Week, Live at the Apollo
- Peter Jones, Just a Minute
- Rosie Jones, QI, 8 Out of 10 Cats
- Phill Jupitus, Never Mind the Buzzcocks, QI
- Miles Jupp, Mock the Week, Have I Got News for You

=== K ===
- Sarah Keyworth, Mock the Week, 8 Out of 10 Cats
- Roy Kinnear, Blankety Blank
- Jonathan King, Blankety Blank
- Bobby Knutt, Blankety Blank
- Athena Kugblenu, Mock the Week
- Nish Kumar, Mock the Week, The News Quiz, QI

=== L ===
- Eddie Large, Blankety Blank
- Danny La Rue, Blankety Blank
- Lauren Laverne, Never Mind the Buzzcocks, Have I Got News for You, Mock the Week
- Laura Lexx, Mock the Week
- Syd Little, Blankety Blank
- Cariad Lloyd, QI, Would I Lie to You?
- Sean Lock, Have I Got News for You, QI, 8 Out of 10 Cats
- Josie Long, 8 Out of 10 Cats, Never Mind the Buzzcocks
- Zoe Lyons, QI, Mock the Week
- Humphrey Lyttelton, I'm Sorry I Haven't a Clue

=== M ===
- Lee Mack, Would I Lie to You?
- Henry McGee, Blankety Blank
- Don Maclean
- Una McLean, Blankety Blank
- Jason Manford, 8 Out of 10 Cats, Would I Lie to You?, Just a Minute, QI, Never Mind the Buzzcocks, Room 101, Celebrity Juice
- Alfred Marks, Blankety Blank
- Arthur Marshall, Call My Bluff
- Rory McGrath, They Think It's All Over
- Michael McIntyre, 8 Out of 10 Cats
- Paul Merton, Have I Got News for You
- Sarah Millican, QI, Would I Lie to You?
- David Mitchell, QI, Would I Lie to You?, Mock the Week, The Big Fat Quiz of the Year, The Bubble, The Unbelievable Truth
- Johnny More, Blankety Blank, Punchlines
- Diane Morgan, Would I Lie to You?, Have I Got News For You
- Robert Morley, Call My Bluff
- Frank Muir, Call My Bluff

=== N ===
- Derek Nimmo, Just a Minute
- Ross Noble, Have I Got News for You, QI

=== O ===
- Tom O'Connor (comedian), Blankety Blank

=== P ===
- Sara Pascoe, QI, Have I Got News for You
- Rachel Parris, Mock the Week, I'm Sorry I Haven't a Clue, QI
- Andy Parsons, Mock the Week, QI
- Lucy Porter, Mock the Week, Have I Got News for You, Never Mind the Buzzcocks
- Sue Perkins, Just a Minute, The News Quiz, The 99p Challenge

=== R ===
- Robin Ray, Call My Bluff
- Mike Reid, Blankety Blank
- Jon Richardson, 8 Out of 10 Cats
- Cleo Rocos, Blankety Blank
- Ted Rogers (comedian), Blankety Blank
- Jonathan Ross, They Think It's All Over, It's Only TV...but I Like It, Friday Night with Jonathan Ross, The Big Fat Quiz of the Year, The Jonathan Ross Show
- Suzi Ruffell, Mock the Week, QI
- Willie Rushton, Blankety Blank, I'm Sorry I Haven't a Clue

=== S ===
- Linda Smith, The News Quiz, QI
- Lou Sanders, QI, Would I Lie to You?, 8 Out of 10 Cats Does Countdown, 8 Out of 10 Cats
- Freddie Starr, Blankety Blank
- Mollie Sugden, Blankety Blank
- Isy Suttie, As Yet Untitled

=== T ===
- Jimmy Tarbuck, Blankety Blank
- Chris Tarrant, Blankety Blank
- Sandi Toksvig, Call My Bluff, chair of The News Quiz, QI
- Barry Took, The News Quiz

=== U ===
- Tracey Ullman, Blankety Blank

=== W ===
- Mark Watson, Mock the Week, Would I Lie To You, QI
- Robert Webb, Argumental
- Francis Wheen, The News Quiz
- Jack Whitehall, A League of Their Own, Dave's One Night Stand, Mock the Week, 8 Out of 10 Cats, QI
- June Whitfield, Blankety Blank
- Josh Widdicombe, Would I Lie To You, As Yet Untitled, 8 Out of 10 Cats Does Countdown, QI
- Joe Wilkinson, 8 Out of 10 Cats, 8 Out of 10 Cats Does Countdown, Live at the Electric
- Kenneth Williams, Just a Minute
- Barbara Windsor, Blankety Blank
- Bernie Winters, Blankety Blank

== Sketch show/alternative comedians ==
- The League Of Gentlemen
  - Mark Gatiss (born 1966)
  - Steve Pemberton (born 1967)
  - Reece Shearsmith (born 1969)
  - Jeremy Dyson (born 1966)
- Armstrong and Miller
  - Alexander Armstrong (born 1970)
  - Ben Miller (born 1966)
- Richard Ayoade (born 1977), Noel Fielding's Luxury Comedy
- James Bachman, That Mitchell and Webb Look, Sorry, I've Got No Head
- David Baddiel (born 1964), The Mary Whitehouse Experience, Fantasy Football League
- Matt Berry (born 1974), Snuff Box
- Sanjeev Bhaskar (born 1963), Goodness Gracious Me
- Katy Brand (born 1979), Katy Brand's Big Ass Show
- Jasper Carrott (born 1945)
- Craig Charles (born 1964)
- Olivia Colman (born 1974), Bruiser
- Brian Conley (born 1961)
- Hugh Dennis (born 1962), The Mary Whitehouse Experience
- Charlie Drake (1925–2006)
- Adrian Edmondson (born 1957)
- Kevin Eldon (born 1960), Fist of Fun, Big Train, Jam
- Dick Emery (1915–1983)
- Harry Enfield (born 1961), Harry Enfield and Chums
- Kenny Everett (1944–1995)
- The Fast Show
  - Caroline Aherne (1963–2016)
  - Simon Day (born 1962)
  - Charlie Higson (born 1958)
  - John Thomson (born 1969)
  - Arabella Weir (born 1957)
  - Paul Whitehouse (born 1958)
  - Mark Williams (born 1959)
- Noel Fielding (born 1973), Noel Fielding's Luxury Comedy
- Gregor Fisher (born 1953), Naked Video
- Martin Freeman, Bruiser
- Dawn French (born 1957), French and Saunders
- Stephen Fry (born 1957), A Bit of Fry & Laurie
- The Goodies
  - Tim Brooke-Taylor (1940–2020)
  - Graeme Garden (born 1943)
  - Bill Oddie (1941–2026)
- Anil Gupta, Goodness Gracious Me
- Arthur Haynes (1914–1966)
- Patricia Hayes (1909–1998)
- Lenny Henry (born 1958)
- Benny Hill (1924–1992)
- Harry Hill (born 1964)
- Matthew Holness (born 1975), Bruiser, Garth Marenghi's Darkplace
- Dom Joly (born 1967)
- Rufus Jones (born 1975)
- John Junkin (1930–2006)
- Hugh Laurie (born 1959), A Bit of Fry & Laurie
- Matt Lucas, Little Britain
- Rik Mayall (1958–2014)
- Spike Milligan (1918–2002)
- David Mitchell (born 1974), That Mitchell and Webb Look
- Monty Python
  - Graham Chapman (1941–1989)
  - John Cleese (born 1939)
  - Terry Gilliam (born 1940)
  - Eric Idle (born 1943)
  - Terry Jones (1942–2020)
  - Michael Palin (born 1943)
- Morecambe and Wise
  - Eric Morecambe (1926–1984)
  - Ernie Wise (1925–1999)
- Bob Mortimer (born 1959)
- Rob Newman (born 1964), The Mary Whitehouse Experience
- Not the Nine O'Clock News
  - Rowan Atkinson (born 1955)
  - Griff Rhys Jones (born 1953)
  - Mel Smith (1952–2013)
  - Pamela Stephenson (born 1949)
- Nicholas Parsons (1923–2020)
- Nigel Planer (born 1953)
- Steve Punt (born 1962), The Mary Whitehouse Experience
- Vic Reeves (born 1959)
- Peter Richardson (born 1951), The Comic Strip
- Jennifer Saunders (born 1958)
- Alexei Sayle (born 1952)
- Sensible Footwear
- Peter Serafinowicz (born 1972)
- Frank Skinner (born 1957)
- Smack the Pony
  - Fiona Allen (born 1965)
  - Doon Mackichan (born 1962)
  - Sally Phillips (born 1970)
- Laura Solon (born 1979), Ruddy Hell! It's Harry and Paul, Al Murray's Multiple Personality Disorder
- Meera Syal (born 1961), Goodness Gracious Me, The Kumars at No. 42
- Catherine Tate (born 1968), The Catherine Tate Show
- The Two Ronnies
  - Ronnie Barker (1929–2005)
  - Ronnie Corbett (1930–2016)
- Tracey Ullman (born 1959)
- David Walliams (born 1971), Little Britain
- Robert Webb (born 1972), That Mitchell and Webb Look, Bruiser
- Ellie White (born 1989)
- Harry Worth (1917–1989)

== Film ==
- Rowan Atkinson (born 1955), Mr Bean's Holiday, Mr Bean, Johnny English, Johnny English Reborn
- Russell Brand, St Trinians, Forgetting Sarah Marshall
- Bernard Bresslaw (1934–1993)
- Charlie Chaplin (1889–1977)
- John Cleese (born 1939), Monty Python films
- Sacha Baron Cohen (born 1971), Ali G, Borat, Brüno
- Robbie Coltrane (1950–2022)
- Steve Coogan (born 1965)
- Bernard Cribbins (1928-2022)
- Windsor Davies
- Ade Edmondson, Guest House Paradiso
- Lee Evans (born 1964)
- Marty Feldman (1933–1982), Young Frankenstein
- George Formby (1904–1961)
- Martin Freeman (born 1971)
- Nick Frost, Shaun of the Dead, Hot Fuzz
- Terry Gilliam (born 1940), Monty Python films
- Will Hay (1888–1949)
- Eric Idle (born 1943), Monty Python films
- Sid James (1913–1976), Carry On films
- Terry Jones (1942–2020), Monty Python films
- Stan Laurel (1890–1965), half of Laurel and Hardy
- Rik Mayall, Drop Dead Fred, Guest House Paradiso
- Michael Palin (born 1943), Monty Python films
- Monty Python
- Dudley Moore (1935–2002), Arthur, 10
- Bill Nighy (born 1949)
- Simon Pegg, Shaun of the Dead, Hot Fuzz
- Leonard Rossiter (1926–1984)
- Peter Sellers (1925–1980), Dr. Strangelove, Inspector Clouseau films
- Alastair Sim (1900–1976), Green for Danger, The Belles of St Trinian's
- Eric Sykes (1923–2012)
- Terry Thomas (1911–1990), The Green Man, Private's Progress, Brothers in Law
- Kenneth Williams (1926–1988), Carry On films
- Norman Wisdom (1915–2010)

== Theatrical comedians ==
- Arthur Lowe (1915–1982), played in the theatre from his debut in 1945 until his death in 1982
- Margaret Rutherford (1892–1972), started performing from 1925 at the Old Vic and continued her career till 1966

== Sitcom comedians ==
- Mark Addy (born 1964), Still Standing, Trollied
- Caroline Aherne (1963–2016), The Royle Family
- Emily Atack (born 1989), The Inbetweeners
- Rowan Atkinson (born 1955), Blackadder, The Thin Blue Line, Mr. Bean
- Helen Atkinson-Wood (born 1955), Blackadder the Third, Radio Active radio series
- Richard Ayoade (born 1977), Garth Marenghi's Darkplace, The IT Crowd
- Bill Bailey (born 1964), Spaced, Black Books
- Morwenna Banks (born 1961), The Thick of It, Ruddy Hell! It's Harry and Paul, Saxondale
- Ronnie Barker (1929–2005), Porridge, Open All Hours
- Chris Barrie (born 1960), Red Dwarf, The Brittas Empire
- Mathew Baynton (born 1980), Ghosts
- Norman Beaton (1934–1994), Desmond's, The Fosters
- Richard Beckinsale (1947–1979), Porridge, Rising Damp
- Matt Berry (born 1974), Garth Marenghi's Darkplace, The IT Crowd, The Mighty Boosh
- Jack Binstead (born 1996), Bad Education
- Simon Bird (born 1984), The Inbetweeners, Friday Night Dinner
- James Bolam (born 1935), The Likely Lads, Only When I Laugh
- Jo Brand (born 1957), Getting On, Going Forward
- Richard Briers (1934–2013), The Good Life, Ever Decreasing Circles
- James Buckley (born 1987), The Inbetweeners, Zapped, White Gold, I Feel Bad
- Kathy Burke (born 1964), Gimme Gimme Gimme
- Patrick Cargill (1918–1996), Father, Dear Father
- Natalie Casey (born 1980), Two Pints of Lager and a Packet of Crisps
- John Challis (1942–2021), Only Fools and Horses, The Green Green Grass
- Emma Chambers (1964–2018), The Vicar of Dibley
- Craig Charles (born 1964), Red Dwarf
- John Cleese (born 1939), Fawlty Towers
- Martin Clunes (born 1961), Men Behaving Badly, Reggie Perrin
- Michaela Coel (born 1987), Chewing Gum
- Ronnie Corbett (1930–2016), Sorry!
- Judy Cornwell (born 1940), Keeping Up Appearances
- Matthew Cottle (born 1967), Game On, Citizen Khan
- Michael Crawford (born 1942), Some Mothers Do 'Ave 'Em
- Jack Davenport (born 1973), Coupling
- Windsor Davies (1930–2019), It Ain't Half Hot Mum, Never the Twain
- Julia Davis (born 1966), Nighty Night
- Lucy Davis (born 1973), The Office, The Villains of Valley View
- Richard Dawson (1932–2012), Hogan's Heroes
- Angus Deayton (born 1956), Nighty Night, One Foot in the Grave
- Jack Dee, Lead Balloon, Josh, Bad Move
- Jamie Demetriou (born 1987), Stath Lets Flats
- James Dreyfus (born 1968), The Thin Blue Line, My Hero, Gimme Gimme Gimme
- Clive Dunn (1920–2012), Boys Will Be Boys, Dad's Army
- Paul Eddington (1927–1995), The Good Life, Yes Minister
- Adrian Edmondson (born 1957), The Young Ones, Bottom
- Jimmy Edwards (1920–1988), Whack-O!
- Barry Evans (1943–1997), Doctor in the House, Mind Your Language
- Simon Farnaby (born 1973), Ghosts
- Noel Fielding (born 1973), The Mighty Boosh, The IT Crowd
- James Fleet (born 1952), The Vicar of Dibley
- Jane Freeman (1935–2017), Last of the Summer Wine
- Martin Freeman (born 1971), The Office, Hardware
- Dawn French (born 1957), The Vicar of Dibley
- Nick Frost (born 1972), Spaced, Hyperdrive
- Robert Fyfe (1930–2021), Last of the Summer Wine
- Tony Gardner (born 1964), My Parents Are Aliens, Lead Balloon
- Ricky Gervais (born 1961), The Office, Extras
- Tamsin Greig (born 1966), Black Books, Green Wing
- Deryck Guyler (1914–1999), Please Sir!, Sykes
- Sarah Hadland (born 1971), Miranda, The Job Lot
- Tony Hancock (1924–1968), Hancock's Half Hour
- Blake Harrison (born 1985), The Inbetweeners, Kate & Koji
- Miranda Hart (born 1972), Miranda
- Nick Helm (born 1980), Uncle
- Julia Hills (born 1957), 2point4 Children
- Jane Horrocks (born 1964), Absolutely Fabulous, Trollied
- Martha Howe-Douglas (born 1980), Ghosts
- Karl Howman (born 1952), Brush Strokes
- Peter Howitt (born 1957), Bread
- Jessica Hynes (born 1972), Spaced
- Celia Imrie (born 1952), dinnerladies, After You've Gone
- John Inman (1935–2007), Are You Being Served
- Jameela Jamil (born 1986), The Good Place
- David Jason (born 1940), Only Fools and Horses, Open All Hours
- Danny John-Jules (born 1960), Red Dwarf
- Lesley Joseph (born 1945), Birds of a Feather
- Peter Kay (born 1973), Phoenix Nights, Max and Paddy's Road to Nowhere
- Gorden Kaye (1941–2017), 'Allo 'Allo!
- Penelope Keith (1940–2026), The Good Life, To the Manor Born
- Humphrey Ker (born 1982), American Auto
- Matt King (born 1968), Peep Show
- Jessica Knappett (born 1984), Drifters
- Belinda Lang (born 1953), 2point4 Children
- John Laurie (1897–1980), Juno and the Paycock, Dad's Army
- John Le Mesurier (1912–1983), Dad's Army
- Helen Lederer (born 1954), Absolutely Fabulous
- Jane Leeves (born 1961), Frasier, Hot in Cleveland
- Robert Lindsay (born 1949), Citizen Smith, Nightingales, My Family
- Maureen Lipman (born 1946), Agony, Agony Again
- Ralf Little (born 1980), The Royle Family, Two Pints of Lager and a Packet of Crisps
- Robert Llewellyn (born 1956), Red Dwarf
- Roger Lloyd-Pack (1944–2014), Only Fools and Horses, The Vicar of Dibley
- Arthur Lowe (1915–1982), Dad's Army, Bless Me Father
- Joanna Lumley (born 1946), Absolutely Fabulous
- Nicholas Lyndhurst (born 1961), Only Fools and Horses, Butterflies, Goodnight Sweetheart
- John Mahoney (1940–2018), Frasier
- Millicent Martin (born 1934), Frasier, Grace and Frankie
- Rik Mayall (1958–2014), The Young Ones, Bottom, The New Statesman
- Nichola McAuliffe (born 1955), Surgical Spirit
- Greg McHugh (born 1980), Gary: Tank Commander, Fresh Meat
- Will Mellor (born 1976), Two Pints of Lager and a Packet of Crisps
- Stephen Merchant (born 1974), The Office, Extras
- Buster Merryfield (1920–1999), Only Fools and Horses
- Ben Miles (born 1966), Coupling
- David Mitchell (born 1974), Peep Show
- Warren Mitchell (1926–2015), Till Death Us Do Part
- Diane Morgan (born 1975), Motherland, Rovers
- Neil Morrissey (born 1962), Men Behaving Badly
- Brian Murphy (1932–2025), Man About the House, George and Mildred, Last of the Summer Wine
- Al Murray (born 1968), Time Gentlemen Please
- Kunal Nayyar (born 1981), The Big Bang Theory
- Robin Nedwell (1946–1999), Doctor in the House
- Paul Nicholas (born 1945), Just Good Friends
- Gary Olsen (1957–2000), 2point4 Children
- Bill Owen (1914–1999), Last of the Summer Wine
- Geoffrey Palmer (1927–2020), The Fall and Rise of Reginald Perrin, Butterflies, As Time Goes By
- Katherine Parkinson (born 1977/1978), The IT Crowd
- Trevor Peacock (1931–2021), The Vicar of Dibley
- Simon Pegg (born 1970), Spaced
- Vicki Pepperdine (born 1961), Getting On, Bad Education
- Bill Pertwee (1926–2013), Dad's Army, It Ain't Half Hot Mum
- Sally Phillips (born 1970), Miranda, Parents
- Duncan Preston (born 1946), dinnerladies
- Lucy Punch (born 1977), Ben and Kate, Motherland, Bloods
- Caroline Quentin (born 1960), Men Behaving Badly, Kiss Me Kate
- Pauline Quirke (born 1959), Birds of a Feather, Office Gossip
- Adil Ray (born 1974), Citizen Khan
- Anne Reid (born 1935), dinnerladies
- Laurence Rickard (born 1975), Ghosts
- Charlotte Ritchie (born 1989), Fresh Meat, Ghosts
- Tony Robinson (born 1946), Blackadder
- Linda Robson (born 1958), Birds of a Feather
- David Roper (born 1944), The Cuckoo Waltz, Leave it to Charlie
- David Ross (born 1945), Yanks Go Home, Leave it to Charlie
- Leonard Rossiter (1926–1984), The Fall and Rise of Reginald Perrin, Rising Damp
- Patricia Routledge (1929–2025), Keeping Up Appearances
- Andrew Sachs (1930–2016), Fawlty Towers
- Peter Sallis (1921–2017), Last of the Summer Wine, First of the Summer Wine, Leave it to Charlie
- Jennifer Saunders (born 1958), Absolutely Fabulous
- Julia Sawalha (born 1968), Absolutely Fabulous
- Prunella Scales (1932–2025), Fawlty Towers, After Henry
- Joan Sims (1930–2001), Til Death Us Do Part, Sykes, On the Up, As Time Goes By
- Frank Skinner, Shane
- Kiell Smith-Bynoe (born 1989), Stath Lets Flats, Ghosts, Man Like Mobeen
- Sheridan Smith (born 1981), The Royle Family, Two Pints of Lager and a Packet of Crisps
- Isy Suttie (born 1978), Peep Show
- Eric Sykes (1923–2012), Sykes
- Liza Tarbuck (born 1964), Watching, The Big Breakfast, Linda Greene, Mount Pleasant, Saxondale
- Josephine Tewson (1931–2022), Keeping Up Appearances, Last of the Summer Wine, Shelley
- Joe Thomas (born 1983), The Inbetweeners, White Gold
- Catherine Tyldesley (born 1983), Scarborough
- Reg Varney (1916–2008), The Rag Trade, On the Buses
- Anjana Vasan (born 1987), We Are Lady Parts, Fresh Meat
- Jennifer Veal (born 1991), As the Bell Rings, Jessie
- Gary Waldhorn (1943–2022), Brush Strokes, The Vicar of Dibley
- Rudolph Walker (born 1939), Love Thy Neighbour, The Thin Blue Line
- Julie Walters (born 1950), dinnerladies
- Robert Webb (born 1972), Peep Show, The Smoking Room
- Charlie Wernham (born 1994), Bad Education
- Jack Whitehall (born 1988), Bad Education
- June Whitfield (1925–2018), Terry and June, Absolutely Fabulous
- Brian Wilde (1921–2008), Last of the Summer Wine, Porridge
- Ben Willbond (born 1973), Ghosts, The Thick of It
- Richard Wilson (born 1936), Only When I Laugh, One Foot in the Grave
- Penelope Wilton (born 1946), Ever Decreasing Circles
- Sir Norman Wisdom (1915–2010), Wit and Wisdom
- Victoria Wood (1953–2016), dinnerladies
- Mike Wozniak (born 1979), Man Down
- Matilda Ziegler (born 1964), Mr. Bean

== Spoof show comedians ==
- Caroline Ahern, The Mrs Merton Show
- Richard Ayoade, Man to Man with Dean Learner
- Sacha Baron Cohen, The 11 O'Clock Show, Da Ali G Show
- Steve Coogan, Knowing Me, Knowing You, Alan Partridge's Scissored Isle
- Daisy May Cooper, This Country
- Rebecca Front, On The Hour, The Day Today, Knowing Me, Knowing You
- Ricky Gervais, The Office
- Matthew Holness, Garth Marenghi's Darkplace
- Paul Kaye, aka Dennis Pennis
- Chris Langham, People Like Us
- Doon Mackichan, Brass Eye, Knowing Me, Knowing You
- Diane Morgan, aka Philomena Cunk
- Chris Morris (born 1965), Brass Eye, Blue Jam, The Day Today
- John Oliver, The Daily Show
- Peter Serafinowicz, Look Around You, Peter Serafinowicz Show
- Victoria Wood, Acorn Antiques

== Stand-up comedians ==
=== A ===
- Russ Abbot (born 1947)
- James Acaster (born 1985)
- Maisie Adam
- Will Adamsdale (born 1974)
- Terry Alderton (born 1970)
- Babatunde Aleshe
- Stephen K. Amos (born 1967)
- Avril Angers (1918–2005)
- Bennett Arron (born 1973)
- Sadia Azmat (born 1987)

=== B ===
- Bill Bailey (born 1964)
- Angela Barnes (born 1976)
- Julian Barratt (born 1968)
- Alistair Barrie
- Aaron Barschak (born 1966)
- Rob Beckett (born 1986)
- Ninia Benjamin
- Katherine Bennett (born 1976)
- Danny Bhoy (born 1974)
- John Bishop (born 1966)
- Bethany Black (born 1978)
- Adam Bloom (born 1971)
- Jo Brand (born 1957)
- Russell Brand (born 1975)
- Kevin Bridges (born 1986)
- Marcus Brigstocke (born 1973)
- Jen Brister (born 1975)
- Doc Brown (born 1977)
- Roy 'Chubby' Brown (born 1945)

=== C ===
- Rhona Cameron (born 1965)
- Alan Carr (born 1976)
- Jimmy Carr (born 1972)
- Jasper Carrott (born 1945)
- Jo Caulfield (born 1963)
- Ted Chippington (born 1962)
- Paul Chowdhry (born 1974)
- Bridget Christie (born 1971)
- Craig Charles (born 1964)
- Laurence Clark (born 1974)
- Julian Clary (born 1959)
- Roisin Conaty (born 1979)
- Billy Connolly (born 1942)
- Janice Connolly (born 1954)
- Phil Cool (born 1948)
- Nina Conti (born 1974)
- Lewis Costello (born 1993)
- Hal Cruttenden (born 1969)

=== D ===
- Jim Davidson (born 1954)
- Greg Davies (born 1968)
- Jack Dee (born 1961)
- Gary Delaney (born 1973)
- Les Dennis (born 1953)
- Ken Dodd (1927–2018)
- Joel Dommett (born 1985)
- Sophie Duker

=== E ===
- Ben Elton (born 1959)
- Phil Ellis (born 1981)
- Jo Enright (born 1968)
- Lee Evans (born 1964)

=== F ===
- Simon Fanshawe (born 1956)
- Noel Fielding (born 1973)
- Micky Flanagan (born 1962)
- Paul Foot (born 1973)

=== G ===
- Ed Gamble (born 1986)
- Ricky Gervais (born 1961)
- Rhod Gilbert (born 1968)
- Mo Gilligan (born 1988)
- Janey Godley (1961–2024)
- Kerry Godliman (born 1973)
- Dave Gorman (born 1971)
- Boothby Graffoe (born 1962)
- Ivo Graham (born 1990)
- Jeff Green (born 1964)

=== H ===
- Malcolm Hardee (1950–2005)
- Mike Harding (born 1944)
- Jeremy Hardy (1961–2019)
- Natalie Haynes (born 1974)
- Miranda Hart (born 1972)
- Richard Herring (born 1967)
- Wil Hodgson (born 1978)
- Dominic Holland (born 1967)
- Rufus Hound (born 1979)
- Russell Howard (born 1980)
- Frankie Howerd (1917–1992)
- Lee Hurst (born 1962)

=== I ===
- Robin Ince (born 1969)
- Suzy Eddie Izzard (born 1962)

=== J ===
- Roy Jay (1948–2007)
- Jimeoin (born 1966)
- Jimmy Jones (born 1938)
- Milton Jones (born 1964)
- Phill Jupitus (born 1962)

=== K ===
- Russell Kane (born 1975)
- Peter Kay (born 1973)
- Phil Kay (born 1969)
- Sarah Keyworth
- Shaparak Khorsandi (born 1973)
- Daniel Kitson (born 1977)

=== L ===
- Andrew Lawrence (born 1979)
- Stewart Lee (born 1968)
- Sean Lock (1963–2021)
- Josie Long (born 1982)
- Norman Lovett (born 1946)
- Joe Lycett (born 1988)

=== M ===
- Lee Mack (born 1968)
- Jason Manford (born 1981)
- Bernard Manning (1930–2007)
- Francesca Martinez (born 1978)
- Chris McCausland (born 1977)
- Michael McIntyre (born 1976)
- Stephen Merchant (born 1974)
- Sarah Millican (born 1975)
- Shazia Mirza (born 1976)
- John Moloney
- Bob Monkhouse (1928–2003)
- Eleanor Morton
- Simon Munnery (born 1967)
- Al Murray (born 1968)

=== N ===
- Ross Noble (born 1976)

=== O ===
- John Oliver (born 1977)
- Andrew O'Neill (born 1979)
- Kev Orkian (born 1974)
- Andi Osho (born 1973)

=== P ===
- Papa CJ
- Sara Pascoe (born 1981)
- Lee Peart (born 1990)
- Sue Perkins (born 1969)
- Lucy Porter (born 1973)

=== R ===
- Romesh Ranganathan (born 1978)
- Jon Richardson (born 1982)
- Matt Richardson (born 1991)
- Abi Roberts (born 1976)
- John Robins (born 1982)
- George Roper (1934–2003)
- Adam Rowe (born 1992)
- Suzi Ruffell (born 1986)

=== S ===
- Lou Sanders
- Ahir Shah
- Tom Simons (born 2004)
- Frank Skinner (born 1957)
- Daniel Sloss (born 1990)
- Gordon Southern
- Freddie Starr (1943–2019)
- Mark Steel (born 1960)
- Ian Stone (born 1963)

=== T ===
- Jimmy Tarbuck (born 1940)
- Ellie Taylor (born 1983)
- Mackenzie Taylor (1978–2010)
- Paul Taylor (born 1986)
- Dave Thompson (born 1960)

=== V ===
- Johnny Vegas (born 1970)
- Ava Vidal (born 1976)
- Andre Vincent (born 1964)
- Tim Vine (born 1967)
- Eros Vlahos (born 1995)

=== W ===
- Oliver Wakefield (1909–1956), "The Voice of Inexperience"
- Rick Wakeman (born 1949)
- Holly Walsh (born 1980)
- Seann Walsh (born 1985)
- Mark Watson (born 1980)
- Jack Whitehall (born 1988)
- Josh Widdicombe (born 1983)
- Joe Wilkinson (born 1975)
- Mike Wozniak (born 1979)

=== Y ===
- Gina Yashere (born 1974)

=== Z ===
- Andy Zaltzman (born 1974)

== Comedy double acts ==
- Adam and Joe
- Ant and Dec (aka P.J. & Duncan)
- Aynuk and Ayli
- Armstrong and Miller
- Baddiel and Skinner
- The Mighty Boosh (Julian Barratt and Noel Fielding)
- Bell & Spurling
- Cannon and Ball
- Carrington-Brown
- Billy Caryll and Hilda Mundy
- Cassetteboy
- Charters and Caldicott
- Chuckle Brothers
- Cissie and Ada
- Clapham and Dwyer
- Collinson and Dean
- Peter Cook and Dudley Moore (aka Derek and Clive and Pete and Dud)
- Cullen and Carthy
- Dan and Phil
- The Delightful Sausage
- Dick and Dom
- Mr Don & Mr George
- Elsie and Doris Waters
- Fayne and Evans
- Flanagan and Allen, also appeared as part of The Crazy Gang
- Flanders and Swann
- Francie and Josie
- Flanagan and Allen
- Ford and Sheen
- French and Saunders
- Frisky & Mannish
- Fry and Laurie
- Ricky Gervais and Stephen Merchant
- Goodbear
- Hale and Pace
- Harry and Paul (Harry Enfield and Paul Whitehouse)
- Haver and Lee
- Him and Me
- Hinge and Bracket
- Hope and Keen
- Horne & Corden
- Hudson and Pepperdine
- Kenway and Young
- The Krankies
- Laurel and Hardy (Stan Laurel was originally from Britain)
- Lee and Herring
- Little and Large
- Matt Lucas and David Walliams (Little Britain)
- Mark and Lard
- Max & Ivan
- Mel and Sue
- Mike and Bernie Winters
- Mitchell and Webb
- Morecambe and Wise
- Morris and Cowley
- Murgatroyd and Winterbottom
- Murray and Mooney
- National Theatre of Brent
- Nat Mills and Bobbie
- Naughton and Gold, also appeared as part of the Crazy Gang
- Nervo and Knox, also appeared as part of the Crazy Gang
- New Art Club
- Newman and Baddiel
- The Oblivion Boys
- John Oliver and Andy Zaltzman (The Bugle)
- Parsons and Naylor
- Patton Brothers
- Simon Pegg and Nick Frost
- Poluski Brothers
- Punt and Dennis
- Pustra/Vile-een's Vaudeville
- Reeves and Mortimer
- Revnell and West
- Rik and Ade (Bottom, The Dangerous Brothers)
- Ryan and Ronnie
- Sanford and Lyons
- Scott and Whaley
- Shaw and Lee
- Mel Smith and Griff Rhys Jones
- Straitjacket
- Struck Off and Die
- Totally Tom
- Trevor and Simon
- The Two Johns (John Bird and John Fortune)
- The Two Ronnies
- Watson & Oliver
- The Western Brothers
- Victoria Wood and Julie Walters

== Comedy triple acts ==
- Bremner, Bird and Fortune
- Daphne
- The Goodies
- The Goon Show
- The League of Gentlemen
- Pappy's
- The Penny Dreadfuls
- The Scaffold
- Sensible Footwear
- Three of a Kind (Lenny Henry, Tracey Ullman, David Copperfield)
- Willie, West and McGinty

== Poets with a comedic bent ==
- Pam Ayres (born 1947)
- Les Barker
- Penny Broadhurst
- Craig Charles
- John Cooper Clarke
- Ivor Cutler (1923–2006)
- Cyril Fletcher (1913–2005)
- John Hegley
- Tim Key
- Roger McGough
- Henry Normal
- Owen O'Neill
- Joshua Seigal
- Lemn Sissay
- Stanley Unwin (1911–2002)
- Rogan Whitenails

== Blog and internet humourists ==
- Ben Croshaw
- Michael Dapaah
- Amelia Dimoldenberg
- Mo Gilligan
- Daniel Howell
- Phil Lester
- Rhodri Marsden

== Cartoonists, caricaturists, etc. ==
- Barry Appleby (1909–1996), Skit and Skat, The Gambols
- George Cruikshank (1792–1878)
- Chris Donald (born 1960), Viz
- Carl Giles (1916–1995)
- James Gillray (1757–1815)
- William Hogarth (1697–1764)
- Gerald Scarfe
- Bill Tidy (1933–2023)

== Raconteurs and after-dinner speakers ==
- Barry Cryer (1935–2022)
- Lance Percival (1933–2015)
- Peter Ustinov (1921–2004)
- Rick Wakeman (born 1949)
- Kenneth Williams (1926–1988)

== See also ==
- List of British comedy films
- List of comedians
- Lists of British people
