= List of acts that have appeared on the Royal Variety Performance =

Also see List of Royal Variety Performances.

The following is a list of acts that have appeared on the Royal Variety Performance. It includes the years which each act appeared.

== 0-9 ==
- 42nd Street: 1985

== A ==
- a-ha: 1988
- Russ Abbot: 1988
- Three Aberdonians: 1938
- Philip Achille: 2007
- The Acrobats: 1984
- Adam and the Ants: 1981
- Edie Adams: 1962
- Tony Adams: 1982
- Errol Addison: 1932
- Adele: 2010
- Jules Adrian: 1945
- African Footprint: 2000
- Max Again: 1970
- Roberto Alagna: 1998
- Terry Alderton: 1999
- Charles Aldrich: 1912
- Michael Aldridge: 1955 (London)
- Aleggria House Troupe: 1997
- Peter Alex-Newton: 1985
- Fred Allandale: 1921
- Chesney Allen: 1951, 1954, 1980
- Les Allen: 1938
- Herb Alpert's Tijuana Brass: 1969
- The Amandis: 1955 (Blackpool)
- Scott Ambler: 1997
- Shirley Ambrose: 1958
- Stephen K. Amos: 2007
- Anastacia: 2002, 2009
- Clive Anderson: 1994
- Moira Anderson: 1969, 1978, 1982
- Victor Andre: 1928
- Eamonn Andrews: 1953
- Julie Andrews: 1948, 1958, 1977
- Brian Andro: 1984
- Paul Anka: 1977
- Josephine Anne: 1955 (Blackpool)
- Annie - the Musical: 1998, 2017
- The cast of Animal Crackers: 1998
- Antonio and his Spanish Ballet Company: 1958
- The Argentine Gauchos: 1989
- Armstrong and Miller: 2008
- Rob Ashley: 1938
- The Seven Ashtons: 1949
- Arthur Askey: 1946, 1948, 1952, 1954, 1955 (Blackpool), 1957, 1959, 1968, 1978, 1980
- Michael Aspel: 1985
- The Three Astaires: 1947
- A.C. Astor: 1928
- Eileen Atkins: 1984
- Rosalind Atkinson: 1938
- Rowan Atkinson: 1980, 1990
- Richard Attenborough: 1955 (London), 1990
- Winifred Atwell: 1952, 1957
- Madge Aubrey: 1932
- The Nine Avalons: 1945
- The cast of Avenue Q: 2006
- Pam Ayres: 1977
- Charles Aznavour: 1975

== B ==
- B*Witched: 1998
- Babes on Broadway: 1985
- Burt Bacharach: 1963
- Vernel Bagneris: 1981
- Alan Bailey: 1947
- Jim Bailey: 1992
- Cecil Bainbridge: 1923
- Josephine Baker: 1974
- Kenny Ball: 1961, 1978
- Michael Ball: 1989, 1991, 1992, 1997, 2007
- Kaye Ballard: 1950
- Scottish Ballet: 1978
- Bananarama: 1988
- Band of the Training Ship: 1946
- The Band that Jack Built: 1950
- John Barbirolli: 1959
- The Three Barbour Brothers: 1952
- The Barbour Brothers and Jean: 1955 (Blackpool)
- Lawrence Barclay: 1933
- Wilkie Bard: 1912
- John Barrowman: 2006, 2008
- Michael Barrymore: 1983, 1987, 1993
- Biddy Barton: 1938
- Sam Barton: 1919
- Jack Barty: 1938
- Count Basie and his Orchestra: 1957, 1975
- Alfie Bass: 1959
- Shirley Bassey: 1961, 1965, 1971, 1975, 1976, 1987, 1994, 2000, 2005, 2014
- The Bachelors: 1964, 1966
- BBC Northern Dance Orchestra: 1959
- Dick Beamish: 1946
- The Beatles: 1963
- Robert Beatty: 1955 (London)
- The Beautiful Game: 2000
- Gilbert Bécaud: 1966, 1976
- Daniel Bedingfield: 2003
- Bee Gees: 1993
- Harry Belafonte: 1977
- Arthur Bell: 1949
- The Bell Ringers: 1984
- The Bells: 1932
- Nicola Benedetti: 2005
- Billy Bennett: 1926, 1933, 1934
- Tony Bennett: 1965, 1994
- Jack Benny: 1950, 1961, 1965
- Barbara Bentham: 1946
- Michael Bentine: 1949
- Dick Bentley: 1954
- The Three Bentley Sisters: 1950
- George and Bert Bernard: 1948
- Veit Bethke: 1953
- Danny Bhoy: 2003
- Beverley Sisters: 1952, 1958, 1978
- Acker Bilk: 1961, 1978, 1981
- The cast of Billy: 1975
- Billy Elliot the Musical: 2004
- Birmingham Royal Ballet: 1999
- Cilla Black: 1964, 1969, 1993
- Joe Black: 1982
- Stanley Black and the Dance Orchestra: 1951
- Tom Blacklock: 1927, 1931
- The Black light theatre of Prague: 1970
- Blackpool Tower Ballet children: 1955 (Blackpool), 1959
- The Blackpool Tower Circusettes: 1948
- Vivian Blaine: 1953
- Joyce Blair: 1982
- Lionel Blair: 1961, 1968, 1976, 1978, 1980, 1990
- Norah Blaney: 1921
- Blast! (musical): 2000
- Newton Blick: 1955 (London)
- The Bluebell Girls: 1967
- The Bluebells: 1986
- Blue Man Group: 2005
- James Blunt: 2007, 2017
- Wally Boag: 1947
- Andrea Bocelli: 1999, 2005
- Alfie Boe: 2010
- The Bogannys: 1912
- Bolshoi Ballet: 1992
- Michael Bolton: 1997
- Bombay Dreams: 2002
- Bond the legend: 2002
- Boney M.: 1979
- Bon Jovi: 2007
- The Three Bonos: 1934
- Pat Boone: 1958
- Elayne Boosler: 1989
- Tony Booth: 1972
- Webster Booth: 1945
- David Bor: 1930
- Victor Borge: 1980, 1986, 1996
- Yamil Borges: 2004
- Frank Boston: 1934
- Eve Boswell: 1953
- Patti Boulaye: 1981
- Matthew Bourne's Swan Lake: 1997
- Simon Bowman: 1985
- Max Boyce: 1978
- Katie Boyle: 1954
- Boyzone: 1998
- Melvyn Bragg: 1989
- Wilfrid Brambell: 1963
- Russell Brand: 2007
- Betsy Brantley: 1985
- The cast of Bread: 1988
- Rory Bremner: 1986
- Rose Brennan: 1963
- Gerry Brereton: 1952
- Bernard Bresslaw: 1958
- Sarah Brightman: 1985, 1987, 1990
- Alan Brind: 1987
- The British Amateur Gymnastics Team: 1983
- Jon Jon Briones: 2014
- Ronnie Brody: 1955 (London)
- Bob Bromley and his puppets: 1946
- Pamela Bromley: 1955 (Blackpool)
- June Bronhill: 1958
- Jimmy Brooks: 1957
- Colette Brosset: 1955 (London)
- Brotherhood of Man: 1977
- Sam Browne: 1935, 1951
- Barbara Bruce: 1951
- Frank Bruno: 1989
- Dora Bryan: 1959
- Yul Brynner: 1979
- Michael Bublé: 2004, 2009
- Jack Buchanan: 1932, 1954
- Bucks Fizz: 1982
- Francis Bunn: 1963
- Lillian Burgess: 1926, 1928
- Alexandra Burke: 2009
- George Burns: 1961
- Donald Burr: 1952
- Geoffrey Burridge: 1985
- Reginald Burston: 1945
- Jane Burton: 1958
- Lance Burton: 1989
- Darcey Bussell: 1990, 1996, 2007
- Busted: 2003
- Earnest Butcher: 1922
- Jean Butler: 1999
- Red Buttons: 1979
- Sheila Buxton: 1959
- Max Bygraves: 1950, 1952, 1953, 1954, 1957, 1958, 1960, 1961, 1965, 1970, 1976, 1978, 1984, 1986
- Douglas Byng: 1955 (London)
- Ed Byrne: 1999
- Peter Byrne: 1945
- Jason Byrne: 2006

== C ==
- Montserrat Caballé: 1992
- The Cabana Accordion Six: 1946
- Simon Cadell: 1990
- Caesar Twins: 2005
- Marti Caine: 1978, 1979, 1986
- Michael Caine: 1990
- James Cairncross: 1955 (London)
- The Cairoli Brothers: 1946
- Charlie Cairoli with Paul: 1955 (Blackpool)
- Simon Callow: 1984
- Eddie Calvert: 1954
- Cambridge Buskers: 1981
- George Cameron: 1952
- Jean Campbell: 1953
- Cannon and Ball: 1987
- Capital Voices: 2004, 2006
- George Carden: 1955 (London)
- The George Carden Dancers: 1957, 1958
- The George Carden Ensemble: 1952
- Rudy Cardenas: 1962
- Cardini: 1933
- Odali Careno: 1930
- George Carl: 1974, 1983, 1987
- Elsie Carlisle: 1935
- Henry Carlisle: 1937
- Willie Carlisle: 1947
- The Carmenas: 1965
- George Carney: 1938
- Kate Carney: 1935, 1938
- Bal Caron Trio: 1966
- Harry Carpenter: 1989
- Carr & Parr: 1926
- Alan Carr: 2005
- Jimmy Carr: 2002, 2004, 2008
- Vikki Carr: 1967
- Pearl Carr: 1953
- José Carreras: 1985
- Frank Carson: 1986, 1992
- Billy Caryll: 1933
- Jim Casey: 1982
- Billy Castle: 1946
- Roy Castle: 1958, 1959, 1969, 1974, 1982, 1985, 1993
- The cast of Cats: 1992
- Peter Cavanagh: 1949
- The Cavendish Singers: 1951
- Christopher Cazenove: 1990
- Julia Channing: 1955 (London)
- Topsy Chapman: 1981
- Cyd Charisse: 1986
- The Charlivels: 1958
- Charlie Chester: 1946, 1980
- Charlie Chester and his Radio Gang: 1948
- Harry Champion: 1932, 1935, 1938
- Dawson Chance: 1976
- Carol Channing: 1972
- The Eight Charlies: 1963
- Cher: 2001
- Maurice Chevalier: 1949, 1952, 1961
- Chicago: 1997
- George H. Chirgwin: 1912
- Chilton & Thomas: 1930
- The Chinese Classical Theatre Company: 1955 (London)
- Chinese State Circus: 1992
- The Chongqing Troupe: 1988
- Paul Christian: 1958
- Christoper and Columbus: 1932
- Charlotte Church: 1999, 2001, 2005
- Diana Churchill: 1954
- Paul Cinquevalli: 1912
- Cirque du Soleil: 1995, 2000, 2001, 2003
- Clapham and Dwyer: 1938
- Petula Clark: 1968
- P.L. Clark: 1927, 1931
- The Clark Brothers: 1963, 1981
- The Dave Clark Five: 1965
- Petula Clark: 1986
- Thais Clark: 1981
- George Clarke: 1930, 1932, 1934
- Julian Clary: 2000, 2001
- Laddie Cliff: 1923
- Denise Clifford: 1945
- Bernie Clifton: 1979
- Jimmy Clitheroe: 1959
- Rosemary Clooney: 1962, 1987
- Martin Clunes: 2000
- Eric Coates: 1949
- Aileen Cochrane: 1959
- Peggy Cochrane: 1938
- The Band of the Coldstream Guards: 1952
- Alma Cogan: 1955 (London), 1957
- Cheryl Cole: 2010
- George Cole: 1982
- Natalie Cole: 2002
- Maurice Colleano: 1945
- Lesley Collier: 1978, 1982, 1986
- Norman Collier: 1971
- Joan Collins: 1985
- The Colstons: 1948
- Perry Como: 1974
- The Company: 1933
- Brian Conley: 1988, 1992, 1993, 1994, 1995, 1996
- Kenneth Connor: 1982
- Contact: 2002
- Tom Conti: 1992
- Russ Conway: 1959, 1960
- Steve Coogan: 1992, 1996
- Barbara Cook: 1997
- Peter Cook: 1965
- Phil Cool: 1998
- Adam Cooper: 1997
- Gladys Cooper: 1954
- Terence Cooper: 1958
- Tommy Cooper: 1953, 1957, 1964, 1967, 1971, 1977
- Jonathon Cope: 1996
- Coram: 1930
- Harry H. Corbett: 1963
- Ronnie Corbett: 1969, 1973, 1984, 1986, 1988, 1994, 2000, 2003
- The cast of Coronation Street: 1989
- Corps De Ballet: 1953
- The Corrs: 1999, 2001, 2015
- Joaquín Cortés: 1996
- Three Cossacks: 1935
- Billy Cotton and his Band: 1950, 1952, 1960
- Henry Cotton: 1953
- Yvonne Coulette: 1955 (London)
- Noël Coward: 1954
- Crompton: 1952
- Cicely Courtneidge: 1932, 1937, 1951
- Wendy Craig: 1978
- The Crastonians: 1938
- Joe Crastonian: 1947
- Gemma Craven: 1983
- Michael Crawford: 1975, 1992
- The Crazy Gang: 1933, 1937, 1948, 1951, 1952, 1954, 1955 (Blackpool), 1955 (London), 1957, 1960, 1961
- Martin Crewes: 2000
- Jimmy Cricket: 1984
- Walter Crisham: 1954, 1955 (London)
- Ida Crispi: 1912
- Annie Croft: 1921
- The Cromwells: 1948
- Raymond Crowe: 2007
- Leslie Crowther: 1970, 1978, 1982, 1984, 1987, 1990
- Bobby Crush: 1978
- Hal Cruttenden: 2009
- Jamie Cullum: 2003
- Jon Culshaw: 2001
- Peggy Cummins: 1954
- James Currie's Water Spectacle: 1947
- Mark Curry: 1990
- Tim Curry: 1982
- Sammy Curtis: 1946
- Paul Cutts: 1954
- Cynthia & Gladys: 1947
- Miley Cyrus: 2009
- Czechoslovak State Song and Dance Ensemble: 1968

== D ==
- The cast of Dad's Army: 1975
- The Dagenham Girl Pipers: 1938, 1947
- Dailey and Wayne: 1971
- Billy Dainty: 1974, 1980, 1982, 1983, 1984
- Olivia Dale: 1956
- Lorna Dallas: 1982
- Tyne Daly: 1986
- Michael Dalton: 1951
- Chappie D'Amato: 1945
- The Dancers: 1984
- Dance Theatre of Harlem: 1974, 1976
- The Dancin' Company: 1983
- Suzanne Danielle: 1982
- Paul Daniels: 1978, 1984, 1988
- Johnny Dankworth: 1962, 1977
- Alec Dane: 1934
- Billy Danvers: 1932, 1948
- Danya and Alvarez: 1953
- Dany Daniel & Edina: 2007
- Albert Darnley: 1921
- Craig David: 2001
- David and Dania: 2006
- Gloria Davidson: 1958
- Jim Davidson: 1979, 1981, 1996, 1997
- Arthur Davies: 1990
- Tessa Davies: 1963
- Tudor Davies: 1985
- Sammy Davis, Jr.: 1960, 1961, 1966, 1980
- Michael Davis: 1986
- Bobby Davro: 1987
- Anna Dawson: 1982
- Harry Dawson: 1953
- Les Dawson: 1973, 1979, 1987
- Darren Day: 1993
- Frances Day: 1951
- Jill Day: 1959
- Laurie Day: 1938
- Natasha Day: 2007
- Vera Day: 1955 (Blackpool)
- Alfie Dean: 1946
- Chris de Burgh: 1989
- Deep River Boys: 1952
- The Debonairs: 1950
- Roger De Courcey: 1976
- Kiki Dee: 1992
- De Groot: 1930
- Luis Alberto del Paraná: 1963
- Leo De Lyon: 1957
- Delya: 1945
- Michael Denison: 1954, 1990
- The Harry Dennis Dance Sexette: 1937
- Les Dennis: 1984
- Manitas de Plata and Company: 1968
- Florence Desmond: 1937, 1951
- Jerry Desmonde: 1945, 1946, 1954, 1957, 1958
- David Devant: 1912
- Jeanne Devereaux: 1935
- Steve Devereaux: 1985
- The Mary De Vere Dancers: 1951
- The Pamela Devis Dancers: 1970
- Dora de Winton: 1923
- Robert Dhery: 1955 (London)
- The Diamond Brothers: 1935
- Sandra Dickinson: 1978
- Marlene Dietrich: 1963
- Jayne and Adam Di Gatano: 1948
- Celine Dion: 1997
- The Dior Dancers: 1958, 1959
- Sacha Distel: 1967, 1971
- Diversity: 2009, 2012, 2016
- Bob Dixon: 1970
- Reg Dixon: 1949, 1952
- Reginald Dixon: 1955 (Blackpool)
- Omid Djalili: 2002, 2006
- Wayne Dobson: 1990
- Jamieson Dodd: 1923
- Ken Dodd: 1965, 1967, 1972, 1986, 1999, 2006
- Anton Dolin: 1928, 1935
- Plácido Domingo: 1990
- Lonnie Donegan: 1960, 1981
- Donovan: 1981
- George Doonan: 1945
- Val Doonican: 1967, 1968, 1986
- Lita D'Oray: 1938
- The Doriss Girls: 1970
- Diana Dors: 1955 (London), 1960
- Jack Douglas: 1966
- Gil Dova: 1964
- Anthony Dowell: 1983
- Bob Downe: 1995
- Charlie Drake: 1958, 1963, 1978, 1980, 1984
- Alfred Drake: 1955 (London)
- Simon Drake: 1992
- The Drambuie Kirklston Pipe Band: 2003
- Eleanor Drew: 1955 (London)
- Du Calion: 1919, 1922
- Bernard Dudley: 1923
- Duffy: 2008
- Dukes and Lee: 1975
- Colin Dunne: 1999
- Viviana Durante: 1994
- Jack Durrant: 1947
- Christian Duvalein: 1955 (London)
- Norah Dwyer: 1934

== E ==
- Shirley Eaton: 1954
- Sheena Easton: 1980, 1982
- The cast of EastEnders: 1986
- Eclipse 1998
- Paul Eddington: 1984
- Jack Edge: 1927, 1931
- Noel Edmonds: 1979
- Jimmy Edwards: 1951, 1952, 1953, 1955 (London), 1960
- Gus Elen: 1935
- El Granadas and Peter: 1946
- Duke Ellington and his Orchestra: 1973
- G. H. Elliott: 1925, 1948, 1958
- Peter Elliott: 1958
- Kerry Ellis: 2008
- John Ellison: 1952
- Elsa and Waldo: 1949
- Ben Elton: 2000
- Bella Emberg: 1988
- Dick Emery: 1973
- Empire Pool Festival Choir: 1953
- The World Cup winning England football team: 1966
- English National Ballet: 2007
- English National Opera: 2004
- Arthur English: 1951, 1980
- Enya: 1997
- Erasure: 1988
- David Essex: 1989
- Gloria Estefan: 1992, 2003
- Eternal: 1996
- Eugene's Magyar band: 1932
- David Evans: 1951
- Fred Evans: 1983, 1985
- Norman Evans: 1937, 1947, 1951
- Dame Edna Everage: 1984, 2013

== F ==
- Adam Faith: 1960
- Paloma Faith: 2017
- Fame – The Musical: 1997
- Gwen Farrar: 1921
- Fred Farrn: 1912
- Alice Faye: 1985
- Tony Fayne: 1951
- Marty Feldman: 1970
- Stuart Fell: 1984
- Felix Felton: 1958
- Joaquin Pérez Fernandes and his Latin American Company: 1951
- John Field: 1955 (Blackpool)
- Sid Field: 1945, 1946
- Brent Fields: 1946
- Fanny Fields: 1912
- Gracie Fields: 1928, 1937, 1947, 1950, 1951, 1952, 1957, 1964
- Frank Finlay: 1984
- Christine Finn: 1955 (London)
- Dudu Fisher: 1987
- Eddie Fisher with the BBC Northern Orchestra: 1955 (Blackpool)
- Five Star: 1987
- Bud Flanagan: 1947, 1951, 1954, 1957, 1960
- Flanagan and Allen: 1932, 1933, 1935, 1950, 1955 (Blackpool)
- Michael Flanders: 1963
- Tim Flavin: 1985
- The Flemings: 1922
- Cyril Fletcher: 1978, 1980
- Graham Fletcher: 1983, 1985
- Jimmy Fletcher: 1935
- Mr. Flotsam and Mr. Jetsam: 1927, 1931
- Flur na H-alba: 2003
- The Flying Banvards: 1919
- The Flying De Pauls: 1955 (Blackpool)
- Florence and Frederic: 1954
- The cast of Folies Bergère: 1989
- Rosemarie Ford: 1989
- Florrie Forde: 1935, 1938
- The Ford Motor Works Military Band: 1958
- Andy Ford: 1997
- Forever Plaid: 1993
- Hugh Forgie: 1966
- George Formby: 1937, 1955 (Blackpool)
- Bruce Forsyth: 1958, 1971, 1975, 1980, 1988
- Del Foss: 1935
- Teddy Foster: 1938
- Aline Fournier: 1933
- Roy Fox and his band: 1933
- Boy Foy: 1935
- Betty Frankiss: 1938
- Aretha Franklin: 1980
- Bill Fraser: 1959
- Nina & Frederik: 1961
- David Frost: 1989
- Stephen Fry: 1987, 1990
- Loie Fuller Band: 1923
- The Full Monty: 2001
- Funny Girls: 2004, 2005
- Will Fyffe: 1922, 1925, 1932, 1937

== G ==
- Christopher Gable: 1966
- Miklos Gafni: 1951
- Lady Gaga: 2009, 2016
- Zoe Gail: 1952
- Pamela Gale: 1958
- Helen Gallagher: 1950
- James Galway: 1979, 1984, 1987, 1990
- Barclay Gammon: 1912
- Ganjou Brothers and Juanita: 1933, 1937
- The Three Garcias: 1947
- Judy Garland: 1957
- Lesley Garrett: 1993
- Jill Gascoine: 1990
- Gaston and Andree: 1933, 1938
- Stephen Gately: 1998
- Gareth Gates: 2002
- Pearly Gates: 1981
- Anthony Gatto: 1984
- Dustin Gee: 1984
- Helen Gelzer: 1982
- Roy Genson: 1958
- Phillipe Genty and Company: 1973
- Muriel George: 1922
- Billy Geraghty: 1999
- Geraldo and his Tango Orchestra: 1933, 1955 (Blackpool)
- Ernie Gerrard: 1935
- Angela Gheorghiu: 1994, 1998
- Carroll Gibbons: 1951
- Mary Gibbs: 1921
- Debbie Gibson: 1993
- John Gielgud: 1990
- Gigi: 1985
- Beniamino Gigli: 1952
- Lewis Gilbert: 1923
- Rhod Gilbert: 2008
- Girls Aloud: 2004, 2012
- Gertie Gitana: 1948
- Peter Glaze: 1955 (Blackpool), 1982
- Evelyn Glennie: 1987
- Sharon Gless: 1986, 1992
- Paddy Glyn: 1959
- Tommy Godfrey: 1982
- Jimmy Gold: 1951
- Whoopi Goldberg: 2009
- The Golden Girls: 1988
- Bob Golding as Eric Morecambe: 2009
- Henry Goodman: 1997
- Delta Goodrem: 2004
- Ken Goodwin: 1971
- Peter Goodwright: 1987
- The Goofers: 1957
- Noele Gordon: 1949, 1974
- Philip Gould: 1985, 1992
- Nadezhda Gracheva: 1992
- Russell Grant: 1984
- Stéphane Grappelli: 1971, 1986
- George Graves: 1938
- Billy Gray: 1982
- Dolores Gray: 1947, 1949, 1987
- Dulcie Gray: 1954, 1990
- Larry Grayson: 1994
- Grease: 1993
- Gillian Gregory: 1983
- Band of the Grenadier Guards: 1990
- Beryl Grey: 1955 (Blackpool)
- 'Monsewer' Eddie Gray: 1933, 1946, 1951
- Ronnie Grearder: 1938
- The Great Alexander Troupe: 1948
- Buddy Greco: 1963
- Juliette Gréco: 1966
- Harry Green: 1954
- Hughie Green: 1971
- John Gregson: 1955 (London)
- Joe Greig: 1955
- Larry Gretton: 1963
- Mona Grey: 1927, 1931
- Griffith Brothers: 1923
- Lydia Griffiths: 1997
- Grigorovich Ballet of the Bolshoi Theatre: 1993
- Marion Grimaldi: 1958
- Josh Groban: 2004, 2008
- Grock: 1919
- Martin Guerre: 1996
- Guys and Dolls cast members: 1953, 1985, 2005
- Paul Gyngell: 1992
- Gypsy: A Musical Fable: 2001
- The Gypsy Boys Band: 1937

== H ==
- Larry Hagman: 1980
- The cast of Hairspray: 2007
- Halama and Konarski: 1946
- Binnie Hale: 1950, 1954
- Hale and Pace: 1987, 1995
- Bill Haley & His Comets: 1979
- The West End cast of Half a Sixpence: 1963
- Adelaide Hall: 1951
- Rena Hall: 1923
- Henry Hall and the BBC Dance Orchestra: 1934
- The Hallé Orchestra: 1959
- Johnny Hallyday: 1965
- Chico Hamilton Quartette: 1964
- Marvin Hamlisch: 1995
- Tony Hancock: 1958
- Tommy Handley 1923, 1938
- John Hanson: 1982
- The Alan Harding Dancers: 1987
- Cedric Hardwicke: 1934
- Robert Hardy: 1990
- Herbert Hare: 1954
- Howell Harger: 1930
- Dolly Harmer: 1927, 1931
- The Harmony Revellers: 1935
- Anita Harris: 1981, 1990
- Bob Harris: 1955 (London)
- Keith Harris: 1984
- Rolf Harris: 1967, 1978, 1985
- Richard Harris: 1982
- Rex Harrison: 1958
- Harrison & Fisher: 1935
- Harold Hart: 1938
- June Hart: 1934
- Russell Harty: 1985
- Harvey: 1949
- Harvey and the Wallbangers: 1984
- Bill Harvey: 1958
- Judith Harvey: 1958
- Ernest Hastings: 1919
- Will Hatton: 1938
- Jeremy Hawk: 1955 (London)
- Will Hay 1925, 1928, 1930, 1945
- Will Hay Jnr : 1930
- Sessue Hayakawa: 1923
- J. Milton Hayes: 1921, 1925
- Rick Hayes: 1926
- Arthur Haynes: 1961, 1965
- Hy Hazell: 1947
- Rupert Hazell: 1923
- David Healy: `1985
- Hear’Say: 2001
- Richard Hearne: 1938, 1954
- Ted Heath and his Band: 1948, 1954
- The Heavy Cavalry and Cambrai Band: 2007, 2009
- Dick Henderson: 1926, 1946
- Dickie Henderson: 1957, 1959, 1962, 1963, 1972, 1981
- Billy Hendrix: 1933
- Herschel Henlere: 1957
- Lenny Henry: 1981
- Paul Henry: 1983
- Ruthie Henshall: 1997
- Leslie Henson: 1954, 1955 (London)
- Doreen Hermitage: 1958
- Pat Heywood: 1955 (London)
- Marilyn Hightower: 1947, 1949
- Benny Hill: 1955 (London), 1959, 1960
- Harry Hill: 1997
- Vince Hill: 1982
- Vera Hilliard: 1930
- Marilyn Hill-Smith: 1990
- Adam Hills: 2009
- Ronnie Hilton: 1957, 1959
- Bobbie Hind and his all-British Sonara Band: 1923
- Dr Evadne Hinge and Dame Hilda Bracket: 1979, 1989
- Pip Hinton: 1958
- Thora Hird: 1954
- Jack Hobbs: 1933
- Edmund Hockridge: 1953
- Patricia Hodge: 1990
- Trio Hoganas: 1972
- Dominic Holland: 2000
- Jack Holland: 1934
- Jeffrey Holland: 1990
- Frank Holloway: 1947
- Stanley Holloway: 1935, 1958
- Celeste Holm: 1985
- Ethel Hook: 1919, 1925
- Hoops - The Boys: 1951
- Bob Hope: 1954, 1962, 1967, 1977
- Hope and Keen: 1965
- The Hope Repertory Company: 1954
- Rudy Horn: 1954
- Kenneth Horne: 1951
- Lena Horne: 1955 (London), 1964
- Jane Horrocks: 2000
- Hortobagyi Troupe: 1947
- Robert Horton: 1960
- The Houston Sisters: 1926
- Big Howard, Little Howard: 2007
- Simon Howe: 1986
- Frankie Howerd: 1950, 1954, 1960, 1966, 1969
- Bobby Howes: 1955 (London)
- Sally Ann Howes: 1951
- Roy Hudd: 1980, 1982, 1984
- Huddersfield Choral Society: 1986
- Dawn Hughes: 1958
- Finola Hughes: 1983
- Rod Hull and Emu: 1972
- Tony Hulley: 1946, 1947
- Engelbert Humperdinck: 1968
- The Hungarian State Dance Company: 1974
- Gloria Hunniford: 1982, 1985, 1986, 1992
- Michael Hunt: 1945
- George Hurd: 1925
- Johnny Hutch and the Seven Volants: 1951
- Bea Hutten: 1935
- The Three Huxster Brothers: 1927, 1931
- Jack Hylton: 1954
- Jack Hylton and his band: 1926, 1928, 1932, 1934

== I ==
- Frank Ifield: 1962, 1965
- Enrique Iglesias: 2002, 2007
- Julio Iglesias: 1988
- Il Divo: 2005
- Ilford Girls Choir: 1952
- John Inman: 1978, 1981, 1982
- Italia Conti Academy of Theatre Arts Choir: 1994
- Paulette Ivory: 1998

== J ==
- David Jacobs: 1984
- Jack Jackie: 1946
- Nat Jackley: 1946, 1950
- The Jackson 5: 1972
- Jack Jackson: 1952
- Janet Jackson: 1990
- Joe Jackson: 1935
- J.W. Jackson's Twelve English Dancers: 1925
- Hattie Jacques: 1958, 1960, 1963
- Jamelia: 2004, 2006
- Dick James: 1953
- Jimmy James: 1953
- Paddy James: 1958
- Terry James: 1958
- Dr Trevor James: 1997
- Cassidy Janson: 2017
- Eddie Jaye: 1923
- Jean Louis Bert and Ilonka: 1959
- Stephen Jefferies: 1986
- Joy Jeffries: 1935
- Roy Jeffries: 1945
- Joan Jemison: 1958
- Katherine Jenkins: 2005, 2007, 2009, 2012
- The West End casts of Jersey Boys: 2008
- George Jessel: 1955 (London)
- Jethro: 2001
- Jimmy Jewel: 1946, 1952, 1955 (Blackpool), 1959
- Elton John: 1972, 2001, 2004, 2015
- Bill Johnson: 1947, 1949
- Gil Johnson: 1946
- Teddy Johnson: 1957
- Ulrika Jonsson: 1998
- Jo, Jac and Joni: 1953
- Jolson: 1995
- Allan Jones: 1950
- Aled Jones: 1986
- Emrys Jones: 1955 (London)
- Jack Jones: 1972, 1982
- Ria Jones: 1992, 1994
- Tom Jones: 1967, 1969, 1987, 1996
- Vinnie Jones: 2001
- David Jordan: 2007
- The Jukebox Company: 1983
- Jump: 2006

== K ==
- Kafka: 1934
- Natasha Kaplinsky: 2004
- Lola Karsavina: 1923
- William Kat: 1938
- Katrina and Joan: 1923
- Karen Kay: 1982
- Peter Kay: 1998
- Beryl Kaye: 1945
- Danny Kaye: 1948, 1980
- Dave Kaye: 1951
- Gloria Kaye: 1958
- Ian Kaye: 1958
- Stubby Kaye: 1953
- The Kaye Sisters: 1957, 1965, 1978
- Ronan Keating: 1998, 2000, 2002
- Howard Keel: 1954, 1982, 1984, 1990
- Gene Kelly: 1983
- Matthew Kelly: 1984
- Larry Kemble: 1928
- Kris Kemo: 1975
- Fred Kemp: 1923
- Tony Kemp: 1983
- Marie Kendall: 1932
- Conn Kenna: 1926
- Grace Kennedy: 1980, 1983
- Nigel Kennedy: 1989
- The Nigel Kennedy Ensemble: 1002
- Sarah Kennedy: 1983
- Betty Kent: 1938
- Kentwood Junior School Choir: 1992
- Carol Kenyon: 1995
- David Kernan: 1979
- The Keyboard Quintette: 1951
- Chaka Khan: 2009
- Kharum: 1922
- Daphne Kiernander: 1948
- Reginald Kilbey: 1930
- Bobbie Kimber: 1947
- The King and I: 2000
- The King Brothers: 1958
- The King Sisters: 1978
- Barbara King: 1985
- Dave King: 1955 (London)
- Hetty King: 1958
- Kathy Kirby: 1964
- Alan King: 1977
- Neville King: 1965
- Wayne King: 1975
- Nat King Cole: 1960
- Iris Kirkwhite: 1932
- Patricia Kirkwood: 1952, 1955 (London)
- Kirsta and Kristel: 1948
- Kit and The Widow: 1986
- Eartha Kitt: 1958, 1962, 1987
- Yuri Klevtsov: 1992
- Beverley Knight: 2017
- Peter Knight's Merry Makers: 1953
- Koba and Kalee: 1946
- Diana Krall: 2002
- The Krankies: 1978
- KwaZulu: 1975
- Charlie Kunz: 1951

== L ==
- The West End cast of La Cage Aux Folles: 2008
- Laine Theatre Arts Dancers: 1994, 1998, 2003
- Cleo Laine: 1962, 1977, 1980
- Frankie Laine: 1954
- Robert Lamont: 1958
- Robert Lamouret: 1946
- George Lane: 1937
- Lupino Lane: 1938, 1955 (Blackpool), 1955 (London)
- Bonnie Langford: 1982, 1983, 1990
- Chris Langham: 1982
- Lang Lang: 2007
- Diane Langton: 1978, 1982
- Mario Lanza: 1957
- La Pia: 1915
- Danny La Rue: 1969, 1972, 1978
- Latin American Formation Team: 1986
- Latona, Graham and Chandel: 1955 (London)
- Harry Lauder: 1912
- Laurel and Hardy: 1947
- Fay Laurie: 1958
- Hugh Laurie: 1987
- Jack La Vier: 1937
- Stephanie Lawrence: 1981, 1985
- The Syd Lawrence Orchestra: 1970
- Ruth Lawson: 1958
- Evelyn Laye: 1933, 1938
- Andy Leach: 1997
- Brenda Lee: 1964
- Mary Lee: 1938
- Peggy Lee: 1980
- Jan Leeming: 1982, 1985
- Jacques Legras: 1955 (London)
- Adele Leigh: 1958
- Lemar: 2004
- Ute Lemper: 1997
- Fay Lenore: 1954
- Rula Lenska: 1985
- Les 7 Doigts de la Main: 2009
- Les Ballets Trockadero de Monte Carlo: 2008
- Les Charlivels: 1949
- The Two Leslies: 1938
- Les Misérables: 1987
- Alfred Lester: 1912, 1923
- Harry Lester and his Hayseeds: 1946
- Levanda: 1947
- Levanda and the Nine Diamonds: 1932
- Jerry Lewis: 1966, 1989
- Len Lewis: 1937
- Leona Lewis: 2008
- Shari Lewis: 1969
- The Six Lias from round about Regent Street: 1935
- Liberace: 1959, 1960, 1972
- Liberty X: 2002
- Len Liggett: 1953
- Marianne Lincoln: 1946
- The West End cast of The Lion King: 1999, 2008
- Maureen Lipman: 1985
- Moira Lister: 1954
- Little Angels Children’s Folk Ballet of Korea: 1971
- Little Doreen: 1932
- Little and Large: 1977
- Little Tich: 1912
- Littlewoods Girls Choir: 1955 (Blackpool)
- Andrew Lloyd Webber: 1981
- Julian Lloyd Webber: 1981, 1989
- David Lober: 1950
- Josef Locke: 1952
- Johnny Lockwood: 1949
- Cecilia Loftus: 1912
- Jimmy Logan: 1957
- Johnny Logan: 1987
- London Choral Society: 1992
- London Community Gospel Choir: 1992, 1993
- Norman Long: 1927, 1931
- Robert Longden: 1982
- Joe Longthorne: 1989
- Jennifer Lopez: 2001
- Violet Loraine: 1919
- Los Diablos Del Bombo: 1972
- Los Paraguayos: 1963
- Los Reales del Paraguay: 1976
- Joe Loss and his Orchestra: 1963, 1980
- Dennis Lotis: 1957
- Marie Louise: 1947
- Demi Lovato: 2014
- Arthur Lucan: 1934
- Jonathan Lucas: 1950
- Ronn Lucas: 1987
- Lulu: 1967, 1981, 1986, 1993, 1994, 2009
- Alan and Blanche Lund: 1946, 1951
- Ted Lune: 1959
- The Luton Girls Choir: 1948
- Kenny Lynch: 1981
- Ralph Lynn: 1923
- Vera Lynn: 1951, 1952, 1957, 1960, 1975, 1986, 1990
- Carole Lynne: 1950, 1951
- Jeff Lynne's ELO: 2015
- Ben Lyon: 1957

== M ==
- Lee Mack: 2002
- Shirley MacLaine: 1977
- Ross MacManus: 1963
- Aimi MacDonald: 1968
- Mack & Mabel: 1995
- Boyd MacKenzie: 1958
- Ruth Madoc: 1982, 1986
- Mr Magoo: 1984
- Will Mahoney: 1935
- Natalia Makarova: 1983
- Freddie Malcom: 1947
- Henry Mancini: 1966, 1980, 1984
- Jason Manford: 2009, 2017
- Barry Manilow: 1992, 1998, 1999, 2006
- Ethel Manners: 1938
- Jill Manners: 1945
- Mantovani: 1958
- Ennio Marchetto: 1998, 2004
- Marimba Band 1923
- Mariora: 1947
- Alicia Markova: 1957
- Alfred Marks: 1953, 1957
- Jean Marsh: 1984
- George Marshall: 1989
- Jessica Martin: 1987
- Millicent Martin: 1964, 1979, 1982
- Willie Martin: 1958
- Marvo and Dolores: 1966
- Jasper Maskelyne: 1932
- Jackie Mason: 1988, 1996, 2001
- Monica Mason: 1983
- Valerie Masterson: 1986
- Mireille Mathieu: 1967, 1969, 1981
- Jessie Matthews: 1935
- Sheila Matthews: 1950
- Susan Maughan: 1963
- Ekaterina Maximova: 1979
- Lisa Maxwell: 1990
- Brian May: 2008
- Clarice Mayne: 1912, 1919
- Sylvester McCoy: 1982
- Martine McCutcheon: 1998
- Hugh McDermott: 1955 (London)
- Ami McDonald: 1982
- Jane McDonald: 2000
- Ray McDonald: 1949
- Malcolm McEachern: 1921
- Geraldine McEwan: 1990
- Brian McFadden: 2004
- McFly: 2005
- Debbie McGee: 1988
- Alistair McGowan: 1995
- Paddy McGuinness: 2009
- The McGuire Sisters: 1961
- Michael McGuire: 1987
- Michael McIntyre: 2008
- Kenneth McKellar: 1966
- Virginia McKenna: 1979
- Julia McKenzie: 1979, 1983
- Craig McLachlan: 1993
- Stewart McPherson: 1948
- Geraldine McQueen: 2008
- Kitty McShane: 1934
- The cast of Me and My Girl: 1938, 1984
- Michael Meacham: 1955 (London)
- Robert Meadmore: 1990, 2001
- Meat Loaf: 2006
- The Mecca Formation Dancers: 1958
- The Carlo Medini Six: 1933
- Medlock and Marlowe: 1952
- Michael Medwin: 1959
- The Melachrino Strings: 1948
- Paul Melba: 1974
- Katie Melua: 2003
- G. S. Melvin: 1921, 1932, 1938
- William and Joe Mendel: 1933
- Men in Coats: 2002
- The Frank and Kay Mercer Latin American Formation Team: 1983
- Ethel Merman: 1982
- Steve Merritt: 1983
- Billy Merson: 1921, 1923
- The Merry Macs: 1950
- Mike Michaels: 1992
- Bette Midler: 2009, 2014
- Mika: 2009
- Ann Miller: 1988
- Max Miller: 1937, 1950
- Patina Miller: 2009
- Spike Milligan: 1965
- Hayley Mills: 1990
- John Mills: 1990
- Nat Mills and Bobbie: 1946
- Tim Minchin: 2011
- Liza Minnelli: 2004
- Borrah Minnevitch's Harmonica Rascals: 1947, 1949
- Kylie Minogue: 1988, 2000, 2002, 2010, 2012, 2015
- The Black and White Minstrels: 1962
- The cast of Miranda: 2017
- The Mirthful Jovers: 1922
- Miss Saigon: 1991
- Arthur Mitchell: 1976
- The Eight Mitchell Singers: 1959
- George Mitchell Choir: 1951, 1954, 1957, 1958
- The George Mitchell Glee Club: 1950
- Guy Mitchell: 1954
- Margo Mitchell: 1958
- Mary Mitchell: 1958
- Roy Mitchell: 1945
- Warren Mitchell: 1972
- Albert Modley: 1955 (Blackpool)
- The Moiseyev Dance Company: 1964
- Momix - The White Widow: 2007
- Mona and Oliver & The Girls: 1947
- Bob Monkhouse: 1960, 1986, 1988, 1996, 2002
- Matt Monro: 1966
- Kelly Monteith: 1983
- Ron Moody: 1968, 1985
- Dudley Moore: 1965
- Kathryn Moore: 1955 (Blackpool)
- Roger Moore: 1990
- Diana Moran: 1983
- Gillian Moran: 1954
- Morecambe and Wise: 1955 (Blackpool), 1961, 1964, 1968
- Kenneth More: 1958
- José Luis Moreno: 1973
- Harry Moreny: 1946
- Ivor Moreton: 1951
- The Stuart Morgan Dancers: 1938
- Terence Morgan: 1955 (London)
- Patricia Morison: 1951
- Karl Morley: 1958
- Jonathon Morris: 1990
- Lily Morris: 1927, 1931
- James Morrison: 2006
- Morriston Orpheus Choir: 1957
- Doretta Morrow and Company: 1955 (London)
- Moscow State Circus: 1996
- Moscow State Folk Dance Company: 1955 (London)
- Nana Mouskouri: 1973, 1986
- Stella Moya: 1945
- The Mudlarks: 1958
- Irek Mukhamedov: 1990
- Stephen Mulhern: 1997
- Samantha Mumba: 2001
- Hilda Mundy: 1933
- Richard Murdoch: 1951
- Olly Murs: 2013
- Jim Henson's Muppets: 1977, 1993
- Richard Murdoch: 1980
- Murray and Mooney: 1934, 1938
- Al Murray - The Pub Landlord: 2001, 2003, 2007
- Pam Murray: 1953
- Pete Murray: 1982
- Rob Murray: 1952
- Ruby Murray: 1955 (London)
- Kacey Musgraves: 2015
- The Myrons: 1948

== N ==
- Naldi: 1930
- National Youth Jazz Orchestra: 1978
- Naturally 7: 2008
- Oscar Natzka: 1946
- Naughton and Gold: 1932, 1933, 1935, 1946, 1947, 1950, 1951
- Mary Naylor: 1946
- The cast of Neighbours: 1988
- Billy Nelson: 1945
- Nadia Nerina: 1963, 1966
- Nervo and Knox: 1925, 1930, 1932, 1933, 1935, 1947, 1950, 1951
- The New Dollys: 1971
- Raymond Newell: 1937
- Bob Newhart: 1964
- Anthony Newley: 1987
- The New Seekers: 1971
- Wayne Newton: 1966
- Nicholas Brothers: 1948
- Paul Nicholas: 1984, 1985, 1986, 1989
- Billy Nicholls: 1945
- Dandy Nichols: 1972
- Joy Nichols: 1949, 1952
- David Nixon: 1958, 1978
- Trevor Noah: 2014
- Eva Noblezada: 2014
- The Nolan Sisters: 1978
- Noni & Horace: 1928
- Peter Noone & Herman's Hermits: 1970
- Gloria Nord: 1953
- Denis Norden: 1984
- Norman and Ladd: 1950
- Northern Ballet Theatre: 1989
- Notre Dame de Paris: 2000
- Rudolf Nureyev: 1973, 1977

== O ==
- Dara Ó Briain: 2004
- Agnes O'Connell's London Irish Girl Pipers: 1968
- Des O'Connor: 1969, 1995
- Tom O'Connor: 1976
- Talbot O'Farrell: 1925, 1938, 1948
- Mary O'Hara: 1978
- Chuck O'Neil: 1945
- Hilary O'Neil: 1987
- Sheila O'Neill: 1953, 1983
- Tessie O'Shea: 1946
- Cicely Oates: 1934
- Ocklynge Junior School Choir: 1992
- Oklahoma!: 1998
- Pierre Olaf and Company: 1955 (London)
- The cast of Oliver!: 1994
- Vic Oliver: 1945, 1952
- Omagh Community youth choir: 2000
- Omar: 1933
- David Omer: 2004
- On the Town: 1985
- On Your Toes: 1984
- One Direction : 2012, 2014, 2015
- Only Men Aloud!: 2008
- The Oriental Swan: 2003
- Ozzy Osbourne: 2004, 2005
- Sharon Osbourne: 2004
- Donny Osmond: 2001, 2003
- Our House: 2002
- Vladimir Ovchinnikov: 1987
- Bill Owen: 1984

== P ==
- Elaine Paige: 1981, 1990, 1995, 2000
- Roni Page: 1985
- The Palace Girls: 1912
- The Palladium Boys & Girls: 1946, 1954
- The Palladium Girls: 1930, 1932
- Sherman Fisher's Palladium Girls: 1933, 1934, 1935, 1937
- Gaston Palmer: 1930
- Paper Lace: 1974
- Norrie Paramor's Big Ben Banjo Band: 1957
- Merle Park: 1983
- Phil Parke: 1949
- Larry Parker: 1975
- Louis Parker: 1923
- Jack Parnell and his Orchestra: 1954, 1971, 1974, 1977
- Pas de deux: 1979
- Joe Pasquale: 1993, 1995, 1997, 1999, 2005
- The Passing Zone: 1994
- Nigel Patrick: 1954
- Sir Les Patterson: 1984
- Luciano Pavarotti: 2003
- Jack Payne and his BBC band: 1930
- Jack Payne's Orchestra: 1938
- Sarah Payne: 1985
- Tom Payne: 1930
- Billy Pearce: 1994
- Donald Peers: 1950
- Peking Opera: 1986
- The Pendragons: 1995
- Penn & Teller: 2011
- Pepe and his friends: 1978
- Itzhak Perlman: 1981
- The Billy Petch Dancers: 1963
- Peter, Paul and Mary: 1965
- Andi Peters: 1997
- Clarke Peters: 1983
- Sylvia Peters: 1951
- Peters and Lee: 1973
- The Five Petleys: 1921
- The Phantom of the Opera: 1987
- Van Phillips: 1945
- Carolyn Pickles: 1986
- Wilfred Pickles: 1949
- Wilfred and Mabel Pickles: 1955 (Blackpool)
- The cast of Pickwick: 1963, 1993
- The Pietro Brothers: 1959, 1966
- Pilobolus: 2009
- Pinky and Perky with Jan and Vlasta Dalibor: 1963
- Pipifax and Penlo: 1912
- The Pirate King: 1982
- The Pirates of Penzance: 1982
- Gene Pitney: 1966
- Nigel Planer: 1997
- Bert Platt: 1934
- Christine Pocket: 1958
- David Poe: 2009
- Su Pollard: 1985, 1986
- Andre Portasio: 2005
- Gillie Potter: 1930, 1938
- Paul Potts: 2007
- Lorna and Toots Pound: 1922
- Sandy Powell: 1935, 1970, 1980
- Chris Power: 1982
- Michael Praed: 1982
- Harry Prescott and his seven Hindustans: 1930
- Pearl Primus and her Company: 1951
- Arthur Prince: 1912, 1919, 1922
- The Producers: 2004
- Johnny Puleo: 1949
- The Puppini Sisters: 2006
- The Pussycat Dolls: 2008

== Q ==
- 1st Battalion The Liverpool Scottish (T.A.) (Queen's Own Cameron Highlanders): 1955 (Blackpool)
- Pauline Quirke: 1996

== R ==
- Jack Radcliffe: 1951
- The Radio Revellers: 1948
- Syd Railton: 1935
- Rambert Dance Company: 1998
- Alan Randall: 1986
- Elsie Randolph: 1954
- Esther Rantzen: 1978, 1982
- Johnnie Ray: 1955 (London), 1987
- Lynette Ray: 1958
- Ted Ray: 1948, 1949, 1952
- Al Read: 1954, 1955 (Blackpool), 1959
- Ralph Reader's Gang Show: 1937, 1957, 1964
- Rebla: 1921
- Reggie Redcliffe: 1946
- Amanda Redman: 1982
- Arthur Reece: 1935
- Brian Reece: 1954, 1955 (London), 1957
- Angharad Rees: 1984, 1990
- Sonia Rees: 1960
- Joan Regan: 1955 (Blackpool)
- Tomasz Reichelt: 2005
- Beryl Reid: 1985
- Mackenzie Reid: 1953
- Renee and Godfrey: 1921
- Ethel Revnell: 1937, 1953
- Dorothy Reynolds: 1955 (London)
- Rhos Male Voice Choir: 1975
- Griff Rhys Jones: 1988, 1992
- Anneka Rice: 1990
- Reva Rice: 1992
- Tim Rice: 1981, 1992
- Buddy Rich: 1969
- Cliff Richard: 1959, 1973, 1988, 1990, 1995, 1999, 2004, 2005
- Cliff Richard & The Shadows: 1960, 1962, 1964, 1981, 2008
- Juanita Richards: 1933
- Lionel Richie: 2000
- Shane Richie: 2004
- André Rieu and the Johann Strauss Orchestra: 2009
- Diana Rigg: 1989
- Right Said Fred: 1992
- Rihanna: 2008
- Amber Riley: 2017
- LeAnn Rimes: 1999
- Angela Rippon: 1982, 1986
- The cast of Riverdance: 1994, 1995
- Joan Rivers: 1996, 2007
- Harry Robertson: 1959
- Liz Robertson: 1982, 1985
- George Robey: 1912, 1919, 1934
- Eric Robinson Orchestra & Singers: 1954
- Robson & Jerome: 1995, 1996
- Linda Robson: 1996
- The Rockin' Berries: 1967
- Lord Rockingham's XI: 1959
- Rock Steady Crew: 1983
- Anton Rodgers: 1982
- Ginger Rogers: 1969
- Ted Rogers: 1968, 1974
- Romanian National Dance Company and Orchestra: 1967
- The Roly Polys: 1983
- Ronnie Ronalde: 1953
- Mickey Rooney: 1988
- Rosarito: 1937
- Clarkson Rose: 1928
- Julian Rose: 1930
- Jonathan Ross: 1997
- The Three Ross Sisters: 1946
- Norman Rossington: 1959, 1985
- Rostal and Schaefer: 1970
- Round the Horne Revisited: 2004
- Thomas Round: 1958
- Gareth Rowan: 1994
- Derek Roy: 1948
- Harry Roy and his band: 1935
- Royal Albert Hall Orchestra: 1923
- Royal Ballet School: 1983, 1999
- Band of the Royal Marines: 1949
- Royal Variety Performance Dancers: 2000, 2004
- Rita Rudner: 1992
- Billy Russell: 1933, 1947, 1954
- Fred Russell: 1932, 1952
- Max Russell: 1958
- Russian Blue Bird Players: 1923
- Marion Ryan: 1959
- Peggy Ryan: 1949

== S ==
- Alessandro Safina: 2001
- The Three Sailors: 1934
- Peter Sallis: 1984
- Lea Salonga: 1991
- The Mike Sammes Singers: 1969
- George Sampson: 2008
- Kenneth Sandford: 1955 (Blackpool)
- John Sanger: 1949
- Lon Satton: 1992
- H. Gordon Saunders: 1930
- Mervyn Saunders: 1947
- Lily Savage: 1998
- Telly Savalas: 1975
- Scènes de ballet: 1969
- Schaller Brothers: 1954
- Phillip Schofield: 1992
- Jacqui Scott: 1992
- Selina Scott: 1989
- ScottishPower Pipe Band: 2003
- Kenny Seagrove: 1989
- Seal: 2007
- The Searchers: 1981
- Harry Secombe: 1951, 1957, 1958, 1962, 1963, 1969, 1975, 1978, 1987, 1993
- The Seekers: 1966
- P. T. Selbit: 1922
- Peter Sellers: 1954, 1965
- Bruce Seton: 1955 (London)
- Lynn Seymour: 1973
- Three Shades: 1947
- The Shaolin Monks: 1999
- Reginald Sharland: 1921, 1923
- Buster Shaver and his trio of Lilliputians: 1948
- Martin Shaw: 1985
- Sandie Shaw: 1967
- George Shearing: 1987
- Anne Shelton: 1953, 1959, 1978
- Ned Sherrin: 1979
- Scott Sherrin: 1983
- Ella Shields: 1948
- Jake Shimabukuro: 2009
- Kaho Shimada: 1987
- Dinah Shore: 1950
- Showaddywaddy: 1978
- Show Boat: 1985
- The Showgirls: 1955 (Blackpool)
- Victor Silvester and his Ballroom Orchestra: 1958
- Jean Simmons: 1985
- Joan Sims: 1954
- The cast of Sister Act the Musical: 2009
- The Skating Willers: 2005
- Peter Skellern: 1982, 2000
- Frank Skinner: 1994
- Sky High Corps De Ballet: 1948
- The Skyrockets Orchestra: 1948
- Wayne Sleep: 1978, 1983, 1990
- The cast of The Sleeping Beauty: 1963
- James Smillie: 1983
- Faryl Smith: 2009
- The Five Smith Brothers: 1950, 1955 (Blackpool)
- Mel Smith: 1988, 1992
- Will Smith: 2004
- Don Smoothey: 1982
- The Soldiers: 2009
- Zoltan Solymosi: 1994
- Debroy Somers and his band: 1927, 1931
- The cast of The Sound of Music: 2006
- The cast of Spamalot: 2006
- Johnnie Spence and his Orchestra: 1969
- Peggy Spencer: 1986
- Grace Spero: 1945
- Spice Girls: 1997, 1998, 2012,
- Dennis Spicer: 1964
- Dave Spikey: 2005
- Victor Spinetti: 1982
- Dusty Springfield: 1965
- Dougie Squires' Second Generation: 1973
- Paul Squires: 1980
- Teddy St. Denis: 1938
- Stanelli & Douglas: 1928
- Stanley and Mae Quartette: 1934
- Cyril Stapleton with the BBC Show Band: 1955 (London), 1958
- Star for a Night: 2000
- Alvin Stardust: 1981
- The Stargazers: 1955 (London), 1958
- Freddie Starr: 1970, 1989
- Isla St Clair: 1982
- Anthony Steel: 1954
- Tommy Steele: 1963, 1966
- Tommy Steele and his Steelmen: 1957
- Gwen Stefani: 2004
- Pamela Stephenson: 1982
- Steps: 1999, 2020
- Stetson: 1932
- Rachel Stevens: 2003
- Allan Stewart: 1987, 1995
- Amii Stewart: 1979
- Andy Stewart: 1961, 1962, 1978
- Donald B. Stewart: 1954
- Rod Stewart: 2006
- Richard Stilgoe: 1982, 2000
- Stomp: 1998, 2002
- Rene Strange: 1946
- David Strassman: 1996
- Strathclyde Police Pipe Band: 2003
- Elaine Stritch: 1979, 2002
- Una Stubbs: 1972, 1980
- The Stupids: 1971
- Sugababes: 2006
- Diana Ross and The Supremes: 1968
- Randolph Sutton: 1948
- Donald Swann: 1963
- Eric Sykes: 1963
- Frederick Sylvester: 1921

== T ==
- Andre Tahon and Company: 1968
- Take That: 1994, 2006, 2008, 2010, 2018
- Talk of the Town Girls and Boys: 1958
- Valerie Tandy: 1947, 1951
- Ray Tanva: 1958
- Tanya: 1967
- Jimmy Tarbuck: 1964, 1981, 1987, 1992, 2007
- Chris Tarrant: 1992
- Catherine Tate: 2005
- Harry Tate: 1912, 1919, 1925, 1938
- Jim Tavare: 1992, 1994, 1998
- Teatro: 2007
- Kiri Te Kanawa: 1990, 2007
- The Temperance Seven: 1961
- Bryn Terfel: 2000, 2005
- Terry's Juveniles: 1950
- The Alec Thomas Quartet: 1947
- Terry-Thomas: 1946, 1952
- Billy Thorburn: 1951
- Tiller Girls: 1926, 1932, 1938, 1948, 1949, 1950, 1951, 1952, 1953, 1954, 1955 (Blackpool), 1957, 1959, 1960, 1964, 1984
- Vesta Tilley: 1912
- Christopher Timothy: 1982
- Louis Tomlinson: 2015, 2017
- Vittorio Togo: 1933
- Topol: 1982
- Mel Tormé: 1987
- Totò: 1930
- Bobby Tranter: 1946, 1947
- Mr & Mrs Tree: 1925
- Bruce Trent: 1954
- Ann Trevor: 1923
- Tommy Trinder: 1945, 1947, 1950, 1955 (London), 1980
- Jack Tripp: 1955 (Blackpool)
- Trix Sisters: 1922
- George Truzzi: 1955 (Blackpool)
- Sophie Tucker: 1962
- Tommy Tune: 1983
- Joan Turner: 1954
- Tina Turner: 1989
- Shania Twain: 2002
- Twiggy: 1983

== V ==
- Henri Vadden: 1946
- Caterina Valente: 1970
- Valente Valente: 1968
- Dickie Valentine: 1957
- Francis Van Dyke: 1973
- Denise Van Outen: 2001, 2004
- Olga Varona: 1947
- Sylvie Vartan: 1965
- Vladimir Vasiliev: 1979
- Frankie Vaughan: 1957, 1958, 1961, 1985
- Malcolm Vaughan: 1957
- The Veterans: 1969
- Vesta Victoria: 1932, 1938
- The Victoria Palace Girls and Boys: 1955, 1955 (Blackpool)
- The Victoria Palace Girls: 1927, 1928, 1931, 1951
- Vik and Fabrini: 1996
- The Villams: 1971
- Tim Vine: 2000
- Vladimir: 1997
- Arthur Vollum: 1946

== W ==
- Lisa Waddingham: 1989
- Bill Waddington: 1955 (Blackpool)
- Cherry Wainer: 1959
- Douglas Wakefield: 1945
- Celestine Walcott-Gordon: 2000
- Roy Walker: 2009
- David Wall: 1982, 1983
- Max Wall: 1930, 1950
- The Wallabies: 1946
- Ian Wallace: 1952
- Nellie Wallace: 1948
- Shani Wallis: 1954
- Tom Walls: 1923
- Bradley Walsh: 1993, 1999, 2005
- The Wall Street Crash: 1980, 1982
- Thorley Walters: 1954
- Amanda Waring: 1985
- Jack Warner: 1953
- John Warner: 1955 (London)
- Jacqueline Warrell: 1958
- Warren, Latona and Sparks: 1948, 1952
- Jeff Warren: 1952
- Ben Warriss: 1946, 1952, 1955 (Blackpool), 1959, 1980
- Dionne Warwick: 1970
- Dennis Waterman: 1982, 1985
- Elsie and Doris Waters: 1934, 1938
- Lovelace Watkins: 1971
- Adam Watkiss: 2001
- Dilys Watling: 1978
- Russell Watson: 2001
- Dorothy Elizabeth Webb: 1953
- Marti Webb: 1986
- Tom Webster: 1922
- Elisabeth Welch: 1979, 1985
- Harry Weldon: 1922
- Doreen Wells: 1985
- Ruth Welting: 1975
- Chen Wen: 2003
- Señor Wences: 1937
- Matt Wesson: 2025
- Gracie West: 1937
- Kanye West: 2007
- Hayley Westenra: 2003
- The Western Brothers: 1935
- Westlife: 1999, 2000, 2003
- Jimmy Wheeler: 1954
- Albert Whelan: 1927, 1931
- Dawn White and her Glamazons: 1954
- Joyce White: 1958
- Kay White: 1970
- Sheila White: 1983
- Willard White: 1990
- David Whitfield: 1954, 1957
- June Whitfield: 1978
- The cast of Wicked: 2006
- The Wiere Brothers: 1951
- Brian Wilde: 1984
- Marty Wilde: 1959, 1981
- Colm Wilkinson: 1991, 2010
- Edmund Willard: 1955 (London)
- Andy Williams: 1970
- Bransby Williams: 1926, 1938
- John Williams: 1977
- Mark Williams: 2000
- Myles Williams: 1935
- Ylvia 'Kuuma' Williams: 1981
- Roy Willis: 1938
- Gary Wilmot: 1985, 1987, 1994
- Osmund Wilson: 1934
- Precious Wilson: 1981
- Robert Wilson: 1947
- Terry Wilson: 1959
- Wilson, Keppel and Betty: 1933, 1945, 1947
- Robb Wilton: 1926,
- Anona Winn: 1938, 1951
- Bernie Winters: 1982, 1984, 1987, 1990
- Mike & Bernie Winters: 1962
- Norman Wisdom: 1952, 1954, 1958, 1960, 1985
- Terry Wogan: 1984, 1994
- Donald Wolfit: 1954
- Hua Wong: 2003
- Eva May Wong: 1947
- Georgie Wood: 1927, 1931
- Victoria Wood: 1986
- Eli Woods: 1982
- Edward Woodward: 1989
- Billie Worth: 1952
- Harry Worth: 1958, 1960, 1980
- Belinda Wright: 1959
- Helen Wright: 1958
- Hannah Wyatt: 1935

== X ==
- Wen Xiaoyan: 2003

== Y ==
- Yana: 1958
- Mike Yarwood: 1972, 1975, 1976, 1987
- Erica Yorke: 1951
- Mary Young: 1937
- Will Young: 2002, 2005
- The Young Generation: 1971
- Jelke Yuresha: 1959

== Z ==
- Anatoliy Zalevsky: 2001
- Lena Zavaroni: 1976
- Paul Zerdin: 1999, 2002, 2009
- Anne Ziegler: 1945
- The West End cast of Zorro: 2008
- The Zoris: 1947
