= Straitjacket (disambiguation) =

A straitjacket is a garment used for restraint.

Straitjacket may also refer to:

- Straitjacket (comedy duo), a comedy team from England
- Strait Jacket, a novel series by Ichirō Sakaki

== Film ==
- Strait-Jacket, a 1964 Columbia Pictures film starring Joan Crawford
- Straight-Jacket, a 2004 gay-themed romantic comedy film
- Strait Jacket, a 2007 Japanese video series based on the novel series, produced by Feel

== Music ==
- "Straitjacket" (song), a 2023 song by Lena Meyer-Landrut
- Los Straitjackets, an American instrumental band
- The Straightjackets, band led by Delbert McClinton
- "Straight Jacket", a 2018 single by Canadian rock band Theory of a Deadman

== Other ==
- Straitjacket, a professional wrestling hold
