= Fayne =

Fayne is a surname. Notable people with the surname include:

== People ==
- Dorothy Fayne (1889–1976), British actress
- Tony Fayne (1924–2009), English comedian
- Mark Fayne (born 1987), American ice hockey player

== Characters ==
- George Fayne, a character in the Nancy Drew Mystery Stories series
- Michael Fayne, character in V Wars
