= Jimmy Learmouth =

English music hall comedian

- Born: James Fryer; 10 April 1888; Newcastle upon Tyne, England
- Died: 14 April 1921 (aged 33); Broadstone, Dorset, England
- Occupation: Comedian
- Years active: 1910–1921

Jimmy Learmouth (born James Fryer; 10 April 1888 – 14 April 1921) was an English music hall comedian.

== Biography ==
He was born in Newcastle upon Tyne in 1888 (though some sources state Gateshead, and give different years). He began giving public performances by 1910, and moved to London where he developed his singing and dancing skills, and was spotted by a theatre manager who gave him a role in a pantomime at the London Hippodrome. Performing with a large false moustache attached to his face, he found immediate success as a comedian, and performed in music halls around the country in shows such as Harry Day's Keep to the Right.

By 1913, it was reported that he was "one of the greatest comedians of this century", "in tremendous demand", and "excruciatingly funny". His bill matter described him as "The Inimitable Comedian". The writer J. B. Priestley described him as "the funniest man I ever saw... a droll of unique quality.... [He] simply walked round and round the stage, the yell of laughter going on and on." According to Priestley, he performed "improvised passages of tomfoolery... His manner highly personal, unlike any other comedian's, was one in which innocence and impudence were somehow blended." Music hall historian Simon Hampton has suggested that Learmouth was the model for the character Tommy Beamish in Priestley's novel Lost Empires. Comic entertainer Arthur Askey also described Learmouth as "the funniest comedian... forgotten now, but in my opinion... he was the greatest...".

Learmouth married Ruby Riley, from Sydney, Australia, in London in 1916, and continued to appear in shows around the country. Sources describe him as a heavy drinker, with a compulsion for washing his hands. He collapsed while performing on stage in Sheffield in 1921, and spent some time in a nursing home in Broadstone, Dorset, before his death there at the age of 33. He was buried at Kensal Green Cemetery in London.
