= Carrington-Brown =

British music and comedy duo

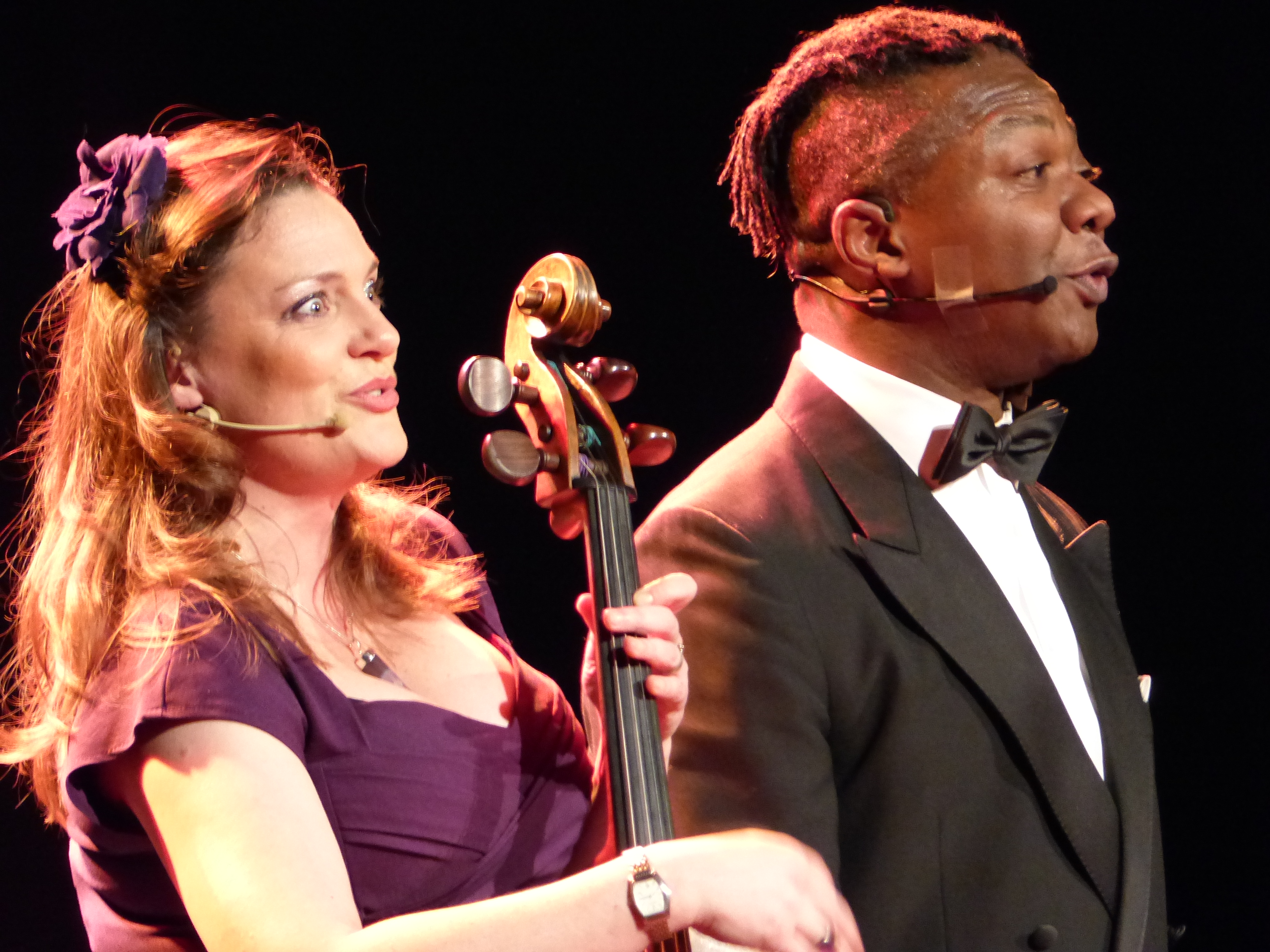
- Carrington-Brown in Schwerter, 2015

Background information
- Origin: England
- Genres: Comedy, Music
- Years active: 2007–present
- Members: Rebecca Carrington, Colin Brown, Joe
- Website: www.carrington-brown.com

Carrington-Brown are a British music and comedy duo formed in 2007 by cellist and singer Rebecca Carrington and singer-actor Colin Brown. They perform in a wide variety of musical styles spanning pop, Bollywood, opera and jazz and have been described as "elegant musical stand-up".

== Background ==
Carrington won a scholarship to study at The Royal Northern College of Music and then went on to complete her Masters of Music at Rice University in Houston, Texas. It was whilst studying in the USA that Carrington first became involved in the comedy scene. She soon began performing at comedy clubs such as The New York Comedy Club and The Comedy Store, LA. She went on to perform on numerous high-profile television and radio programs, plus festivals all over the UK and Europe. Prior to Carrington-Brown, she performed with many orchestras, such as the London Symphony Orchestra, London Philharmonic Orchestra, Royal Philharmonic Orchestra, the Philharmonia and the BBC Symphony Orchestra. It was during this time that she was encouraged to step out of the orchestra and on to the solo stage. As a freelance cellist she has played on film soundtracks, including Harry Potter and Lord of the Rings and recorded with artists such as Aretha Franklin, Paul McCartney, David Byrne and Jill Scott.

Brown began his performing career at the age of 25 when he was cast in the West End production of Carmen Jones. He went on to perform across varying genres on the stage, in film and television, radio and as a voice over artist. Brown has played roles in productions such as La Cage Aux Folles, Smokey Joe’s Café, Driving Miss Daisy and Les Enfants du Paradis with the Royal Shakespeare Company. In 1996, he became a member of the British a cappella group The Magnets, performing with them for over 10 years during which time they toured supporting Lisa Stanfield, Tom Jones and Michael Ball. Brown studied acting at the Rose Bruford Acting School in 1997, whilst continuing to perform professionally. In 2006, Brown joined Robbie Williams for his Close Encounters World Tour as a backing vocalist.

Carrington and Brown met in Edinburgh in 2004 whilst they were both performing at the Fringe Festival and soon decided that they should become a duo. Brown spent a year directing Carrington in her one-woman show, which she took to Edinburgh in 2005 and 2006, but by 2007 they were performing together.

They currently live in Berlin and perform internationally.

== Career ==
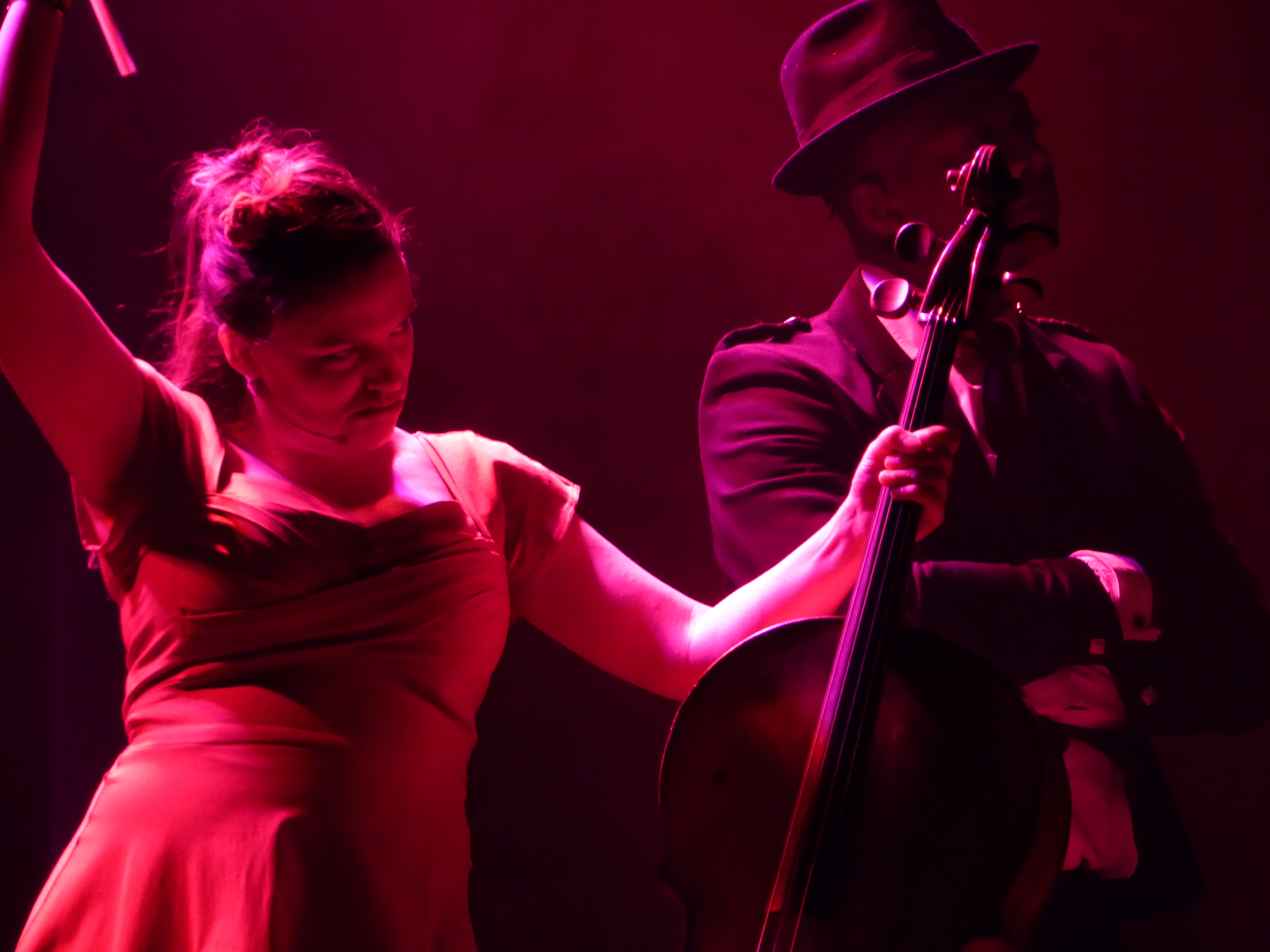
Carrington-Brown at the Schwerter Kleinkunstpreis presentation, 2015

"Me & My Cello" was the original one-woman show that Carrington created in 1996, but after meeting they wrote Brown into the show. It began as a musical journey around the world with Carrington’s cello, Joe and after Brown joined the show he brought in the bagpipes, which he had learnt in the Boy’s Brigade in London from the age of 11.

Since their first show in 2007, "Me & My Cello", they have written and performed 8 shows in total for which they have won numerous international prizes. These include an orchestra show "Comedy Meets Classics and an Operetta, Turnadot. Since performing together as Carrington-Brown they have performed all across Germany, Switzerland, Austria, France, Spain, the Netherlands, Finland, Poland, Croatia, the UK, the US, Canada, India, Brazil and South Africa, performing in English, German, French and Spanish.

In February they were invited to appear on Britain’s Got Talent for ITV in the UK. They have also been featured on many different TV shows in Europe, including an exclusive Arte Documentary, which was featured on Lufthansa inflight Entertainment and Euromaxx.

They have performed their show in such venues as the Concertgebouw Amsterdam, Köln Philharmonie, Tonhalle Zürich, Konzerthaus Vienna, Bonn Opernhaus, Olympia Paris and have performed in festivals such as the Avignon, Edinburgh, Cape Town Comedy, Rheingau and Ludwigsburger Schlossfestspiele.

== Awards ==
Year	Location	Award
2018	Germany	The Moerser Comedy Prize
2009/2014	Germany	The Schwerter Kleinkunstpreis
2009	Germany	Zeck Internet Prize
2008	Germany	The Golden Rose Audience Prize (Rosenau, Stuttgart)
2007	Germany	WDR Prix-Pantheon Prize
2007	Germany	Best Musical Comedy Act (Lindener Spezial Club, Hannover)
2007	France	Prix du Public (Festival de Rocquencourt)
2007	France	Prix d’un Sponsor (Festival de Rocquencourt)
2007	France	Prix Special du Jury (Festival de Rocquencourt)
2007	France	Prix du Public (Festival de Versailles)
2006	Switzerland	Schnee Stern Prize (Arosa Humor Festival)
1996	US	MasterCard Talent Search
