= Rene Strange =

English comic entertainer

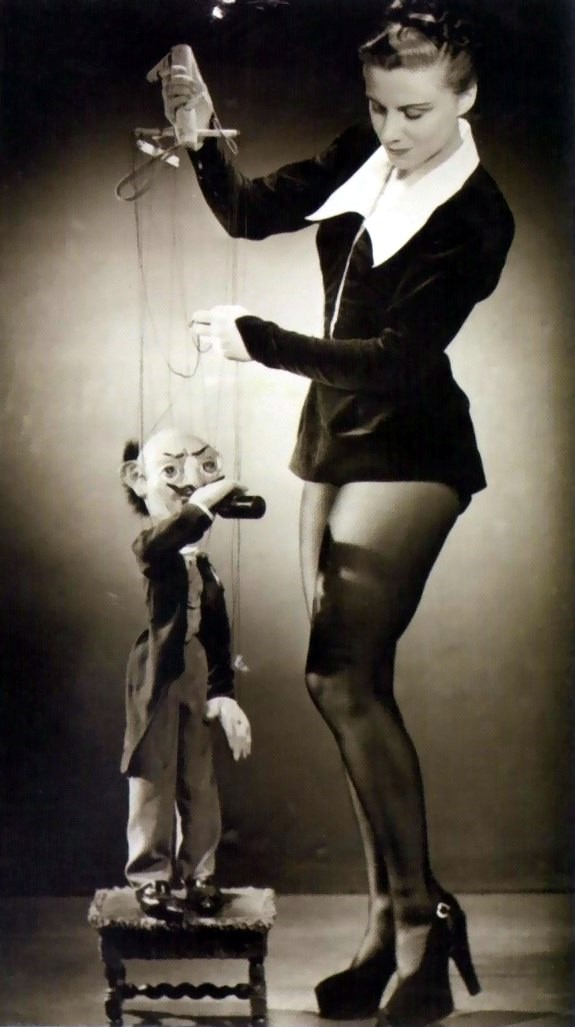
- Rene Strange and a marionette.
- Other names: Renee Strange
- Occupations: Entertainer, puppeteer
- Father: Leslie Strange

Rene Strange, also known as Renee Strange (fl. 1940s–50s), was a comic entertainer known as the "singing cartoonist" and for her risqué show using marionettes, which she performed wearing black stockings. She appeared as part of variety performances, on ice, and in pantomime.

== Early life ==
Rene Strange was the daughter of Leslie Strange, originally known as Wilfred St Clair, who performed comic Dickensian pieces and impersonated famous figures of his time such as Adolf Hitler and Stan Laurel.

== Career ==
Strange's act included drawing caricatures while singing, for which she became known as "the singing cartoonist," and the use of marionettes to perform comic routines to which she added a risqué element by wearing black stockings that showed off her legs.

In 1940, Strange was filmed by British Pathé drawing a caricature of Winston Churchill and singing a patriotic song. She appeared in the Royal Variety Performance in 1946. In 1951, she was filmed by British Pathé performing with puppets Annie Pride of the Rockies; Mr Bertram, an inspector of forms who inspects Rene's legs; and Samoa the Hula Hula Girl.

In 1952, she appeared with Norman Wisdom in a Val Parnell and Bernard Delfont production Paris to Piccadilly, described as a new Folies Bergère revue, at the Prince of Wales Theatre in London. The same year, she also appeared in Pulling Strings with Ann Hogarth, operator of Muffin the Mule, in a film for New Realm Pictures produced by Harold Bairn.

Strange's marionettes employed adult themes and in 1953 she commissioned Bob Pelham of Pelham Puppets to make the Opera Singer with a heaving bosom, the Drunken Singer with wobbly legs, the Choirboy who had a halo but also a catapult, the Can-Can Dancer, and a Strip-tease Artist.

In 1955, she performed with her marionettes at Liseberg amusement park in Gothenburg, Sweden, as part of a variety performance headlined by the trampoline act Paulette and Renee that also featured plate-spinners and shadowgraphs. In 1958, she starred with Benny Hill, Jack Beckitt, and Peter Vernon in a production at the Floral Theatre, Scarborough.

She was principal boy in pantomime, and appeared in ice shows and "ice pantomimes".
