= Billy Danvers =

English comedian (1886–1964)

- Born: William Mikado Danvers; 16 January 1886; Liverpool, England
- Died: 20 March 1964 (aged 78); Manchester, England
- Occupations: Comedian, variety performer
- Years active: 1890–1964

William Mikado Danvers (16 January 1886 – 20 March 1964) was an English comedian and variety show performer.

== Life and career ==
He was born in Liverpool, the son of James Danvers (1855-1915), a well-known singer with the D'Oyly Carte Opera Company, and his wife Annie (née Dobbs). At the time of his birth, they were appearing in a touring show of Gilbert and Sullivan's The Mikado, with James in the title role, and gave their son the operetta's name.

Billy Danvers first appeared on the music hall stage at the age of four, with his father and Little Tich at Newcastle. He then formed a double act with Frank Bass, and made his first London appearance in 1911. Described as "a red-nosed comic of the old school", and billed as "Cheeky, Cheery and Chubby", he became a successful solo comedian in the 1920s and 1930s. He appeared in revues, variety shows, pantomimes (often as "Buttons"), and musical comedies, and performed in New York as well as throughout Britain. He also made many appearances on BBC Radio. In 1942, Pat Hillyard, Assistant Director of Variety at the BBC, instructed all programme producers to scrutinise Danvers' performances, to make sure that he did not "slip anything in on the night".

From 1948, described as "Always Merry and Bright", Danvers toured as part of Don Ross's successful show Thanks for the Memory, and appeared in that year's Royal Variety Performance. He made further appearances in the 1964 Thanks for the Memory tour, but died in Manchester shortly after the end of the tour, at the age of 78.
