= Murray and Mooney =

English comedy double act

Signed photograph - Mooney is on the left

Harry Murray (born Harry Church; 1891–1968) and Harry Mooney (born Harry William Goodchild; 8 October 1889–28 September 1972) comprised the English comedy double act of Murray and Mooney.

They grew up in Richmond, Surrey, and started working together in 1909, with a break for the First World War. After the war, they became established as a classic comedy double act, and performed widely around the country during the 1920s and 1930s. Their bill matter stated that "Even their relatives think they're funny".

They established a format in which Mooney would interrupt Murray, the straight man, and start a joke with the words "I say, I say, I say...", an idiom which they are credited with popularising, though it had been used previously by others. After hearing the punchline, Murray would conclude by saying "I don't wish to know that – kindly leave the stage." The format became well-known and stereotypical, and was often satirised by later performers. While some critics claimed that Murray and Mooney performed "awful jokes delivered at high speed", others have described them as a "classic double act.. [who were] guardians of a tight and restricted format", and in 1935 a critic in The Stage wrote that they "caused so much mirth as to interfere with their business".

The duo appeared at two Royal Variety Performances, in 1934 and 1938. They also appeared regularly in BBC radio broadcasts in the 1930s and during the Second World War.

After Mooney and Murray split up in the mid-1940s, Mooney worked as a double act with Victor King, Mooney and King, continuing into the early 1950s.
