= Lee Peart =

English comedian, actor, and presenter

Lee Peart (born 16 July 1990) is an English comedian, actor, and presenter.

== Early life and education ==
Peart grew up in Cleethorpes and attended The Humberston School in Humberston.

He studied performing arts at the University of Salford, where he graduated with 1st Class Honours.

== Career ==
=== Comedy ===
In 2011, Peart became a regular on the UK comedy circuit while studying for his degree. In 2012 he took part in the BBC New Comedy Award and Chortle Student Comedian of the Year Award.

Peart replaced comic Helen Keeler for a gig in 2015 after she was dropped for "being a woman". Taking a stand against sexism in comedy, Peart and fellow comics refused to perform unless Keeler was reinstated.

In 2017, Peart became the warm-up on ITV's daily magazine panel-show Loose Women.

In October 2021, he spoke out regarding the stereotypes he has received as an openly gay stand-up comic, stating audiences "expect a certain style of comedy based purely on his sexuality". He also notes that as a gay comic he felt he always has to address his sexual identity, stating "If we don't, we'll never have the audience on our side, they'll always be on edge."

In 2022, Peart supported Jason Manford on his UK stand-up tour.

On 3 July 2022, it was announced that Loose Women will bring back their studio audience for the first time since the COVID-19 pandemic, and Peart would be returning as their resident warm-up. It was announced in 2025 that he would be leaving the show amidst budget cuts across ITV Daytime.

In 2023/2024, Peart supported Judi Love on her UK tour.

In 2024, he supported Lloyd Griffith on his UK tour, and he supported Ellie Taylor on her 2025 UK tour.

Since 2025, he and Alan Carr have co-hosted the podcast Bottoms Up! with Alan Carr & Lee Peart - a wine based podcast aimed at making the wine world more accessible.

=== Acting ===
Peart toured the UK in 2016 with Three Days and Three Minutes with Larry, a play about the life of British comedian Larry Grayson.

=== Radio ===
Peart regularly contributes on Talkradio, and was previously a presenter on Gaydio. In 2025, he co-hosted a Christmas radio show on Virgin Radio alongside comedian Alan Carr.

== Personal life ==
Peart is openly gay and a vocal supporter of LGBT equality. He has connections working with George House Trust and Manchester Pride. In 2012, during Manchester Pride, he hosted a candlelit vigil in honour of those who have died of HIV/AIDS. He described the vigil as "one of the most amazing experiences of my career to date". In 2022, Peart appeared on Good Morning Britain discussing the importance of Pride.
