= Nat Mills and Bobbie =

- Born: Nathaniel Miller; 15 January 1900; Stepney, London, England; Roberta Maude Esther Macauley; 19 November 1901; Edinburgh, Scotland
- Died: 13 August 1993 (aged 93); Manchester, England; 20 January 1955 (aged 53); London, England

Comedy career
- Years active: 1923–1955

Nat Mills and Bobbie were a British husband-and-wife comedy double act, active between the 1920s and 1950s. Nat Mills was born Nathaniel Miller (15 January 1900 – 13 August 1993), and Bobbie was born Roberta Maude Esther Macauley (19 November 1901 – 20 January 1955).

== Biography ==
Mills was born in Stepney, London, of Russian Jewish ancestry, and following a childhood accident only had the use of one arm, a fact which he hid from later audiences. He first appeared in pantomime in 1913, before joining a touring concert party, and then going solo as an impressionist. Macauley was born in Edinburgh, started as a child actress, and then sang and danced in musical revues. They met in London in 1923, and formed a double act, performing together at the Empire Theatre in Woolwich in 1929. They established a personal as well as professional relationship, and after several years performing together they married in 1937.

They were successful from the start as a comedy duo, billed as "The Rare Pair". Their comedy was based around mutual misunderstandings, particularly over Bobbie taking figures of speech literally, asking irrelevant questions, and constantly interrupting monologues by the increasingly exasperated Mills. Their catch phrase was "Let's get on with it!", spoken by Mills "in a drawn-out, whining voice". According to Denis Gifford: "Unlike all the other double-acts in the business, neither played the 'straight man', both were equally idiotic."

They incorporated comic dancing and songs into their act. According to Mills, they were the first to popularise the song "There's a Hole in My Bucket", and Mills also wrote songs including "Nice People", later adopted by Flanagan and Allen. They played in pantomimes and variety shows, and toured widely in the 1930s, performing successfully in the United States, Australia and South Africa as well as around Britain. They also became popular on BBC Radio, and broadcast regularly during the Second World War, when they also toured as part of ENSA.

They performed at the first post-war Royal Variety Performance in 1946, and continued to be popular until Bobbie's death in 1955, aged 53. Mills continued to perform for a short time as a solo act, but retired from show business in the mid-1950s. He moved to Manchester, where he worked in his brother's carpet business, but remarried and continued to appear at functions organised by the charity, the Grand Order of Water Rats. He died in Manchester in 1993, aged 93.
