= Rogan Whitenails =

Rogan Whitenails (born Martyn Sutton; 1971 in Chester, UK) is a British poet, fabulist and barotermatismophobia sufferer.

== Barotermatismophobia ==
Combining "baro" (Greek for "gravity") and "termatismos" (meaning "to stop"), Whitenails devised the word "barotermatismophobia" to denote the hitherto undocumented fear of gravity suddenly failing to transmit its force, leading to what the poet describes as a "cataclysmic ascension", whereby everybody and everything is catapulted off the Earth's surface into outer space.

== Motifs, style and imagery ==
Gravity giving up is the motif of much of his work, but he also writes a great deal about the town of Woking, where he lived between 2001 and 2004. Woking's large Toys "Я" Us store and its adjoining multi-storey car park are featured in several of his writings. "Three people threw themselves off the top of the multi-storey car park in as many years as I was there. And the wolf-whistling, that was chilling", replied Whitenails, after he was asked in a radio interview about the town.

In 2026, Whitenails claimed to have experienced paranormal activity whilst staying at a hotel in Stratford with his family.

Further motifs are empathy and apparitionism; his style often relies on paring down metaphors, mostly via rhyming couplets.

He has had four idiosyncratic collections published: Failure Crawled up my Leg (1998, 2002), Gravity is a Babe Lost in the Wood of Ubiquity (2005), Ghostly Sightings of the Pornographic Lady (2008) and Apparitionist (2017).
