= Kenway and Young =

Kenway and Young were a British comedy duo popular in the 1930s and 1940s. They were a married couple, Helen Hemmings Young (née McCartney; 23 March 1905 – 25 June 2001), who performed as Nan Kenway, and Douglas Joseph Young (19 December 1900 – 29 November 1972), who also wrote their scripts.

== Careers ==
Helen "Nellie" McCartney was born in Newcastle, New South Wales, Australia. She studied music at the Sydney Conservatorium, and won a piano scholarship to the London College of Music, moving to England in 1924. There, she took elocution lessons because of her accent, and as a result developed an interest in performing on stage. She joined Ronald Frankau's "Cabaret Kittens" concert party, and at an engagement in Newquay met Douglas Young. He had been born in London, and worked in the City and on a newspaper, before taking to the stage. They started working together, making their first appearances on experimental BBC television programmes in 1932, and married the following year.

Unlike many earlier performers, they built up their popularity through radio appearances, rather than stage work. They developed an act, scripted by Young, consisting of short comic sketches in which they represented various characters, and also highlighted Kenway's piano playing. As a pianist, she was said to be responsible for popularising the Concerto Symphonique by Litolff. They made many appearances on BBC radio during the 1930s, particularly on the show Trolley Bus, in which they appeared as the characters Mr Grice – a food-obsessed old rustic character, with the catchphrases "Very tasty! Very sweet!" and "It makes yer think!" – and Mrs Yatton, landlady of the Startled Hare. In 1940, they had their own series, Very Tasty – Very Sweet. They also appeared, developing the same characters, in the popular satirical revue programme Howdy Folks?, written by Douglas Young and Eric Barker. The show continued through the war years, and in later years teamed Kenway and Young with Kenneth Horne.

As well as their frequent radio appearances during the Second World War, they toured France, India and south east Asia as part of ENSA, and were the opening act at the special Radio Command Performance held in 1942 to celebrate Princess Elizabeth's sixteenth birthday. They also continued to tour on the British theatre variety circuit. They toured Australia in 1949, and continued to make occasional radio appearances on both the BBC and Radio Luxembourg in the early 1950s, their final radio show being in 1954.

Douglas Young died in Surrey in 1972, aged 71. Kenway continued to live in Surrey, and died in 2001, aged 96, in Dorking.
