= Sensible Footwear =

British comedy trio

Sensible Footwear was a British comedy group comprising Alex Dallas, Alison Field, and Wendy Vousden. Their shows incorporated elements of stand-up comedy, sketch comedy, and musical comedy.

== Career ==
Dallas, Field, and Vousden met as amateurs at a festival for women's theater in London, England in 1982. They created Sensible Footwear that same year. The name was suggested by a friend, as an in-joke to other women for whom "sensible footwear" described a type of shoe that was not the norm. They debuted at the Edinburgh Festival Fringe in 1982.

After struggling to break through the misogyny of the male-dominated British comedy scene, in 1989 they emigrated to Canada, where they became legal permanent residents. Though they mostly performed in fringe theaters and small venues across Canada, they also appeared on Canadian radio and television, and performed in a select number of prominent venues across Canada and the United States. They largely wrote their material individually before coming together to discuss what they had written.

== Influences and comedic philosophy ==
The members of Sensible Footwear cite sitcoms, especially British ones, as their primary influences. They learned the comedic form from shows such as Bewitched and I Love Lucy, then honed their feminist voice alongside shows like Absolutely Fabulous. They intended to perform in such a way that women are "the norm," and can feel represented by the comedy. Their goal was to appeal to every audience, making sure that marginalized groups including queer people and women could feel seen by their material. Their humor aimed to be neither too self-deprecating nor too provocative; rather, they tried to strike a happy medium. Vousden said in a 1994 interview: "If you make fun of yourself then other people aren't going to mind about having their vulnerable spots made fun of either."

They self-identified as feminist but did not advertise themselves as such, since feminism had been associated with a lack of humor.

== Critical reception ==
Performing in Britain, the group initially received little critical acclaim. Dallas said in an interview, "In Britain we're thought of as feminist women, so how could we possibly be funny?" This reaction sparked their move to Canada.

In Canada (and the northern United States), they became an instant success within the fringe theater scene, with news of their shows largely traveling by word of mouth. Critics were impressed with the group's sharp wit and crisp, well-timed delivery, as well as their ability to joke about anything. Some critics took offense to the group's occasional vulgarity and use of profanity, while others applauded their masculine comedy style, which differed from that of other female comedians of the day.

A critic in the Ann Arbor News, describing the group as "comedic terrorists," remarked that when he first saw them perform their humor was too cynical. However, on seeing them perform a less cynical set several months later, he described their work as "less crisp and snappy."
