= Jimmy Wheeler =

English comedian

- Born: Ernest Alfred Henry Remnant; 16 September 1910; Battersea, London, England
- Died: 8 October 1973 (aged 63); Brighton, Sussex, England
- Occupation: Comedian
- Years active: 1929–1973 see

Ernest Alfred Henry Remnant (16 September 1910 – 8 October 1973), known professionally as Jimmy Wheeler, was a British variety theatre comedian and pioneer of radio and television. Earlier in his career he worked with his father in the double act Wheeler and Wilson.

== Life and career ==
He was born in Battersea, London, and as a child had violin lessons and learned to dance. His father was music hall entertainer Ernest Remnant (1884–1957), who performed with Frank Wheeler in the double act Wheeler and Wilson, named after a manufacturer of sewing machines.

After Frank Wheeler died, the young Ernest – who had become known as Jimmy after fellow entertainer George Formby Sr introduced him as 'Lucky Jim', and who had held various other jobs including laboratory assistant and straight actor – took over as "Wheeler" to his father's "Wilson". From 1929, father and son performed a popular variety act in character as a sailor and railway porter, combining comic cross-talk with slapstick, music and songs. They appeared on radio, and in early experimental television transmissions in 1932, and the double act was filmed in 1938.

Starting as a solo act in 1949, Jimmy Wheeler established himself as a popular comedian in his own right. A burly man with a moustache, he used a violin as part of his stage act, in the style of Jack Benny. His style was described as "gruff... the archetypal beer-stained bash comic..", and "the epitome of the boozy, four-ale bar story teller". Some of his stage and radio acts were humorous résumés of well-known operas, which he entitled 'Hopra for the Higgerant' ('Opera for the Ignorant', with typical added Cockney-type aitches). His catchphrase, at the end of his act, was "Aye aye, that's yer lot". Wheeler was popular in London and the South of England, but his act was sometimes less well received in Northern England and Scotland.

He appeared regularly on television in the 1950s, tailoring his act to fit the requirements of the new medium while maintaining the same style. From 1956, he had his own series, The Jimmy Wheeler Show, on BBC TV, which ran for three series. Though Wheeler wrote much of his own material, there were additional contributions from Talbot Rothwell, Sid Colin, and John Antrobus.

Wheeler was known as a heavy drinker. Roy Hudd noted that "stories about him are legion", though "most.. are unprintable." He died in Brighton in 1973, aged 63.

His catchphrase "Aye aye, that's yer lot" was sometimes used by later musicians including Ian Dury and Ray Davies.
