= Straitjacket (comedy duo) =

English comedy duo

Straitjacket were a comedy duo from North East England, who wrote original comedy sketches. A lot of their material was transferred to the screen by the original three members: Tom Bennett, Keith Dickinson and Ian Todd. Keith left the group in July 2007, leaving Tom and Ian to continue as a duo until October 8 when they split to pursue solo ventures.

The original three were reunited after a long period apart and decided to do their own brand of comedy with a blend of darkness, randomness and the surreal. This original blend of comedy helped establish them as regular contributors to BBC Radio 1 show The Milk Run.

They contributed to a sketch show on E4 called 'Dog Face' and produced sketch shows for the screen which were regularly seen in the Newcastle area and at comedy festivals across the United Kingdom. North East music talent also contributed their material to Straitjacket, establishing a unique soundtrack for the sketch shows.

Straitjacket attracted praise from press both locally and nationally. In 2006 the group was discovered by Naomi Odenkirk who introduced them to her husband Bob Odenkirk who championed their comedy in America, entering their work into festivals and screenings.

Straitjacket had their work screened at the Montreal Just For Laughs Comedy Festival in 2007 introduced by Bob Odenkirk and David Cross and in September 2007 they won Channel4's 4Talent Award designed to find the “UK's most exciting young creative talent.”

In 2008, Straitjacket finished developing a TV pilot with Bob Odenkirk, titled ‘Straitjacket: Reel Life.’

Tom Bennett is currently developing sitcoms and recording voiceovers.

== Reviews ==
"The next great sketch show." (Bob Odenkirk) Straitjacket Official Page

"Would grace any TV sketch show." (Henry Normal) 4Laughs Review

"Straitjacket have a dark and surreal style of their own that comes somewhere near Lee and Herring." ThreeWeeks Edinburgh Review

"Catch them before they hit the big time" The Crack
