= Fayne and Evans =

English comedy popular in 1940s to 1950s

Fayne and Evans were an English comedy duo who were popular in the late 1940s and 1950s. They were Tony Fayne (born Anthony Terence Alfred Senington; 18 January 1924–30 November 2009) and David Evans (David Frank Evans; 10 March 1922–14 February 1980).

== History ==
They were both born in Bristol, and studied together at Bristol Cathedral School. Together, they devised a routine of impersonations, and won a talent contest in 1940, after which they appeared on Jack Payne's BBC radio show, Your Company is Requested. They were called up for military service, and both served in the Fleet Air Arm, but did not meet up again until they were both working as insurance clerks in 1948, and decided to revive their act.

They appeared on Variety Bandbox in 1949, and frequently on the BBC Light Programme from then on. As well as performing their own routines, they acted as comperes on other shows. According to entertainment historian Richard Anthony Baker, "They were fast, they were sophisticated and they were unique. At the start of their act, they asked their audience to imagine two radio sets side by side. They then performed a sports commentary in complete unison, mimicking well-known sportsmen and commentators with deadly accuracy." In another routine, "speaking in unison, they presented their view of how radio might have sounded in the sixteenth century..". They performed together in the 1951 Royal Variety Performance and the film London Entertains, and supported Judy Garland at her shows at the London Palladium, also in 1951.

The pair split up in 1958, perhaps as a result of Evans' problems with alcohol. Fayne continued his career in entertainment, joining up with another old school friend, Philip Evans, to make comedy records such as Brit. Inst. (British Institutions Explained) (1961) and Fayne Agayne (1963). He also succeeded Nicholas Parsons as straight man to comedian Arthur Haynes, and then, for twenty years, worked as straight man to Norman Wisdom in succession to Jerry Desmonde.

Evans died in Bristol in 1980, aged 57, after some years of alcoholism. Fayne died in New Milton, Hampshire, in 2009, aged 85.
