= Bill matter =

Descriptive phrase identifying acts performing in vaudeville

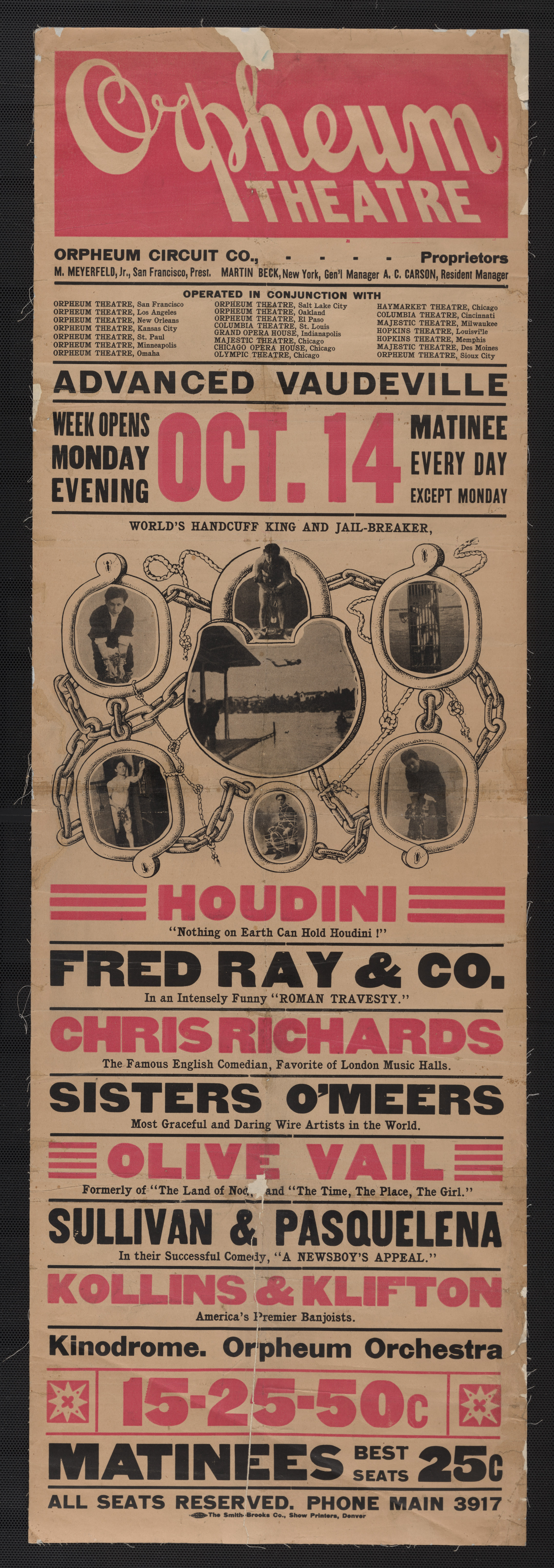
Vaudeville poster showing a bill matter beneath each performer's name, such as "Nothing on Earth Can Hold Houdini!"

In the American vaudeville and British music hall traditions, the bill matter was the identifying phrase used in advertising material to describe and summarize the appeal and attributes of each performer or group of performers. Each was considered as a trademark, not to be used by other performers. Examples in Britain included George Robey, "The Prime Minister of Mirth"; G. H. Elliott, "The Chocolate Coloured Coon"; Max Miller, "The Cheeky Chappie"; and Billy Bennett, "Almost a Gentleman".

According to writer Michael Kilgarriff: "The heydays for these showbiz strap-lines were the inter-war years, for prior to 1914 performers saw little need for a personalised slogan, contenting themselves with such bald descriptions as 'Singer', 'Comedian', or 'Dancer'". By the 1950s, the use of bill matter was seen as old-fashioned.
