= Eric Potts =

Scottish actor, writer and director (born 1965)

- Born: 13 September 1965 (age 61); Irvine, Ayrshire, Scotland
- Occupations: Actor; writer; director
- Years active: 1984–2026
- Criminal charge: Making and distributing indecent images of children
- Criminal penalty: 26 months in prison, suspended for 30 months; 10 years on sex offenders' register

Eric Potts (born 13 September 1965) is a Scottish former actor, writer and director. He appeared in Coronation Street as the eccentric baker Diggory Compton, the father of Molly Compton, and Brookside as Wrexham Football Club Supporter, Mr Moore.

In October 2026, he pleaded guilty to making and distributing indecent images of children. On 13 November, he was given a 26-month suspended jail sentence and was added to the sex offenders' register.

== Career ==
Originally from Irvine, Ayrshire, Scotland, Eric transferred from law studies at Glasgow University to train at the Bristol Old Vic Theatre School from 1984 to 1987, then went on tour with the Theatre of Poland. Early television credits included Peak Practice and The Smiths, and then in 1998 he began a two-year stint as oddball character Mr Moore in Brookside. Subsequent appearances were in Heartbeat, The Royal, Last of the Summer Wine and Steel River Blues. In 2005 Eric also had a part in Rochdale-based film The Jealous God and an episode of Doctor Who, while still being active in theatre.

One of his earliest roles was Big Ears in the UK Tour of Noddy Live.

Potts appeared in the pantomime Dick Whittington, alongside Dame Edna Everage in December 2011 at the New Wimbledon Theatre, London.

In 2013, he played Les Dawson in Cissie and Ada: A Hysterical Rectomy, based upon the characters Cissie and Ada.

He has starred in pantomime as Widow Twankey in Aladdin and in 2013 as Sarah the Cook in Dick Whittington at the Manchester Opera House.

He directed the UK tour of See How They Run for the Reduced Height Theatre in 2014 starring Warwick Davis.

In 2015, he played Sarah the Cook in Dick Whittington at the Liverpool Empire alongside Warren Donnelly, Sally Lindsay and Kurtis Stacey.

In 2017, he appeared alongside Lee Ryan and Zoe Birkett in Snow White and The Seven Dwarfs and again with Zoe Birkett, Louie Spence and Robin Askwith in Aladdin playing Widow Twankey in 2018 and both times at the Darlington Hippodrome for Qdos Entertainment.

In 2018, he was in the Liverpool Empire Theatre with the musical By The Waters of Liverpool.

== Child sex offences and conviction ==
In October 2025, Potts was arrested on suspicion of possession and distribution of indecent images of children. He admitted to making and distributing indecent images of children in October 2026. The charges included making images between May 2015 and October 2025, consisting of five category A images, 16 category B images and 60 category C images, and distributing five images through Telegram. Following his guilty plea, the BBC announced they had removed the episode of Still Game that featured him from iPlayer. On 13 November 2026, Potts was sentenced to 26-months in prison, suspended for 30-months, and placed on the sex offenders' register.

== Filmography ==
=== Film ===
Year	Film	Role	Notes
1995	The Smiths	Geezer	Television film
2000	Between Two Women	Mr. Hathershaw	
2004	Christmas Lights	David Draper	Television film
2005	The Jealous God	Trummery	
2013	Oz the Great and Powerful	Dancing Munchkin	

=== Television ===
Year	Film	Role	Notes
1989	Coronation Street	Colin Dearing	Guest role; 1 episode
1995	Peak Practice	Compere	Episode: "Coming Out"
1996	Coronation Street	Mr. Saxton	Guest role; 1 episode
1998	Coronation Street	Council Official	Guest role; 1 episode
1998–1999	Brookside	Mr. C.B. Moore	Recurring role; 17 episodes
2000	Coronation Street	Court Clerk	Guest role; 1 episode
2001	Heartbeat	Harry Dobson	Episode: "Home Sweet Home"
2003	The Royal	Mr. Pearce	Episode: "Sister of Mercy"
2003	Last of the Summer Wine	Landlord	Episode: "The Man Who Invented Yorkshire Funny Stuff"
2004	Steel River Blues	Dorian Lewis	Episode: "Steel River"
2005	Doctor Who	Oliver Charles	Episode: "Aliens of London"
2005–2006	Coronation Street	Diggory Compton	Series regular; 50 episodes
2007	Get a Grip	Husband	Episode: "Episode 5"
2007	Still Game	Mr. Henderson	Episode: "Recipe"
2008	The Royal Today	Geoff Witter	Episode: "Episode 10"
2008	Dear Green Place	McKenzie	Episode: "Industrial Daftness"
2012	Emmerdale	Mr. Wilkie	Guest role; 1 episode
2012	Mount Pleasant	Taxi Driver	Episode: "Series 2, Episode 6"
2014	Citizen Khan	Mr. Shepherd	Episode: "A Khan Family Christmas"
2018	Casualty	Damian Montserrat	Guest role; 1 episode
2018	Emmerdale	Chaplain	Recurring role; 3 episodes
2019	Demonologist for Hire	Gary	Episode: "The Case of the Residential Evil"
