= Mother's Ruin =

1994 British television sitcom

- Genre: Sitcom
- Written by: John Stevenson
- Directed by: John Stroud
- Starring: Roy Barraclough; Dora Bryan; Julia Deakin; Kay Adshead; Jason Done; Bernard Latham
- Composer: Matt O'Casey
- Country of origin: United Kingdom
- Original language: English
- No. of series: 1
- No. of episodes: 6

Production
- Executive producer: Andy Harries
- Producer: Tony Wood
- Running time: 30 minutes
- Production company: Granada Television

Original release
- Network: ITV
- Release: 29 May – 10 July 1994

Mother's Ruin is a British sitcom that first aired on ITV and was broadcast for one series, consisting of six episodes, between 29 May and 10 July 1994. It starred Roy Barraclough as Leslie Flitcroft, a grumpy health store manager, and Dora Bryan as Kitty Flitcroft, his maddened but snooty mother. The show was produced by Granada Television for the ITV network. It has been repeated on Forces TV and Rewind TV.

== Premise ==
With a plot reminiscent of Sorry!, this was a sitcom written especially for Roy Barraclough who was cast as Leslie Flitcroft, the henpecked 50-year-old son of mother Kitty (Dora Bryan), on whose behalf he manages the family-owned health and homeopathic food store Nurse Nature. Leslie is desperate to run off with his woman-friend of some ten years standing, Wendy Watson (Kay Adshead), but his mother continually destroys his plans and keeps him under her wing.

Kitty, a former stage actress, denies old age with a combined diet of primrose oil and gin. Wendy, a single mother of teenage son Clive (Jason Done), grows increasingly tired of waiting for Leslie to confront his mother, and Brucella (Julia Deakin), the lank-haired plain-Jane shop assistant, is considered by Kitty as ideal daughter-in-law material.

== Cast ==
- Roy Barraclough as Leslie Flitcroft
- Dora Bryan as Kitty Flitcroft
- Julia Deakin as Brucella Pashley
- Kay Adshead as Wendy Watson
- Jason Done as Clive Watson
- Bernard Latham as Mr. Wildman

== Episodes ==
No.	Title	Directed by	Written by	Airdate
1	"Episode 1"	John Stroud	John Stevenson	29 May 1994
Leslie H Flitcroft is worried that the name of the family health shop that he runs, "Nurse Nature", is attracting people mistaking it for a massage parlour. His mother, Kitty, thinks business is business.
2	"Episode 2"	John Stroud	John Stevenson	5 June 1994
It's Leslie's 50th birthday and Kitty's attempts to wreck his relationship with Wendy take an unexpected turn.
3	"Episode 3"	John Stroud	John Stevenson	12 June 1994
When Leslie tries to make a clean breast of it at Ernie Potts' betting shop, he winds up with far more than he bargained for.
4	"Episode 4"	John Stroud	John Stevenson	19 June 1994
Leslie finds out his elderly mother has been humiliating him for her sport.
5	"Episode 5"	John Stroud	John Stevenson	26 June 1994
One of Kitty's old flames comes back into her life.
6	"Episode 6"	John Stroud	John Stevenson	10 July 1994
Brucella Pashley's moment arrives, at last. [Note: There was one week break on 3 July 1994 due to football coverage of the 1994 FIFA World Cup tournament.]

== Reception ==
According to Adam's Nostalgic Memories, "This is yet another entry in the "were there any decent 90s ITV sitcoms?" series, and it must be said that this was one of the worse ones, but somehow, all of the episodes are on YouTube. Mother's Ruin was a sitcom that starred Roy Barraclough. This is someone who had a long and successful career, and he is best-remembered for being in a comedy double-act alongside Les Dawson, and for playing Alec Gilroy in Coronation Street."
