= Mee-mawing =

Speech with exaggerated movements

Coordinates: 53°49′N 2°16′W

Mee-mawing was a form of speech with exaggerated movements to allow lip reading employed by workers in weaving sheds in Lancashire in the nineteenth and twentieth centuries. The noise in a weaving shed rendered hearing impossible so workers communicated by mee-mawing which was a cross between mime and lip reading. To have a private conversation when there were other weavers present, the speaker would cup their hand over their mouth to obscure vision. This was very necessary as a mee-mawer would be able to communicate over distances of tens of yards. It was said that each mill had its own dialect.

The British comedian Hylda Baker used mee-mawing as part of her stage and radio act in the 1950s and in the 1970s and 1980s, Les Dawson and Roy Barraclough used this as part of their Cissie and Ada act.

== See also ==
- Queen Street Mill
