= Colin Edwynn =

English actor

- Born: Colin Edwin Thompson; 23 September 1933; Manchester, Lancashire, England, UK
- Died: 31 October 2018 (age 85); Luton, Bedfordshire, England, UK
- Occupation: Actor
- Years active: 1966-2009
- Spouse: Elizabeth A A Quickfall (m.1959)

Colin Edwynn (23 September 1933 – 31 October 2018) was an actor who appeared as PC Jimmy Conway in the British television soap opera Coronation Street between 1967 and 1972.

== Career ==
He appeared in several episodes of the long running BBC Radio comedy The Clitheroe Kid as Mr Humphrey Brocklebank and worked with Les Dawson in his long-running radio show Listen to Les. He has also appeared in the television series Bergerac, Out of the Blue, Wycliffe and Heartbeat. Edwynn also made an appearance in one episode of the sitcom Dinnerladies.

From 1981 he ran the Queen's Head pub in Tebworth, Bedfordshire.

== Personal life ==
Born as Colin Edwin Thompson, on becoming an actor he changed his name to Colin Edwynn - his surname made up of the name of his idol actor Ed Wynn.

In 1959 he married Elizabeth Quickfall. They had two sons together. His wife predeceased him. Edwynn died in Luton, Bedfordshire on 31 October 2018 aged 85.

== Filmography ==
=== Film ===
| Year | Title | Role | Notes |
|---|---|---|---|
| 1970 | Dick Turpin - and the Legend of Black Bess | Dick Turpin | |
| 1974 | Who Killed Lamb? | Michael | |
| 1974 | Miss Julie | House Servant | |
| 1997 | The Missing Postman | Alfie | |

=== Television ===
| Year | Title | Role | Notes |
|---|---|---|---|
| 1980 | Lady Killers | Dr. James Scott | Episode: "Suffer Little Children" |
| 1988 | First of the Summer Wine | Landlord | Episode: "The Great Indoors" |
