= Meemaw =

Meemaw or Mee-maw may refer to:

- meemaw or mee-mawing, speaking with exaggerated mouth movements to allow lip reading.
- Meemaw or Maw-maw, an affectionate term for a grandmother.
- Constance Tucker ("Meemaw"), a character on The Big Bang Theory franchise.
