= Oh, Doctor Beeching! =

British television sitcom (1995–1997)

- Titlescreen featuring an LMS Ivatt Class 2
- Created by: David Croft; Richard Spendlove
- Written by: David Croft; Richard Spendlove; John Stevenson; Brian Leveson; Paul Minett; John Chapman
- Directed by: Roy Gould
- Starring: Paul Shane; Jeffrey Holland; Su Pollard; Julia Deakin; Stephen Lewis; Perry Benson; Barbara New; Terry John; Paul Aspden
- Country of origin: United Kingdom
- Original language: English
- No. of series: 2
- No. of episodes: 20 (including pilot)

Production
- Executive producer: David Croft
- Producers: David Croft; Charles Garland
- Running time: 30 minutes

Original release
- Network: BBC1
- Release: 14 August 1995 – 28 September 1997

Oh, Doctor Beeching! is a British television sitcom written by David Croft and Richard Spendlove, and produced for the BBC. After a pilot for the programme was broadcast on 14 August 1995, full production saw the sitcom running for two series from 8 July 1996 to 28 September 1997.

The series focuses on the staff of the fictional Hatley railway station, whose lives are disrupted by the arrival of a new station master on the same day that news breaks out over proposed plans by Dr Richard Beeching to close many branch lines and their respective stations. Filming of the sitcom included exterior shots taken at Arley railway station on the Severn Valley Railway, and featured many of the same actors who had performed before in Hi-de-Hi! and You Rang, M'Lord?, including Paul Shane, Jeffrey Holland, and Su Pollard.

Oh, Doctor Beeching! was the last sitcom to be written by Croft, who agreed to produce it for the BBC after initially cutting ties with the corporation over private disagreements. Despite initial good viewing figures when it began, the sitcom was axed following extensive problems competing with other programming on the BBC, including major news coverage in 1997.

== Production ==
Following his work on You Rang, M'Lord?, David Croft severed his ties with the BBC in 1993, after criticising the network for not giving his latest sitcom any repeats on television – something he felt would have helped to build up its audience and improved its appeal. In response to this, the BBC decided to promise him full productive control for a new sitcom, focused on the lives of railway staff at a rural station during the 1960s. Croft agreed to the BBC's offer, and was partnered with Richard Spendlove, who had extensive history with the railways, rather than previous creative collaborators Jimmy Perry and Jeremy Lloyd.

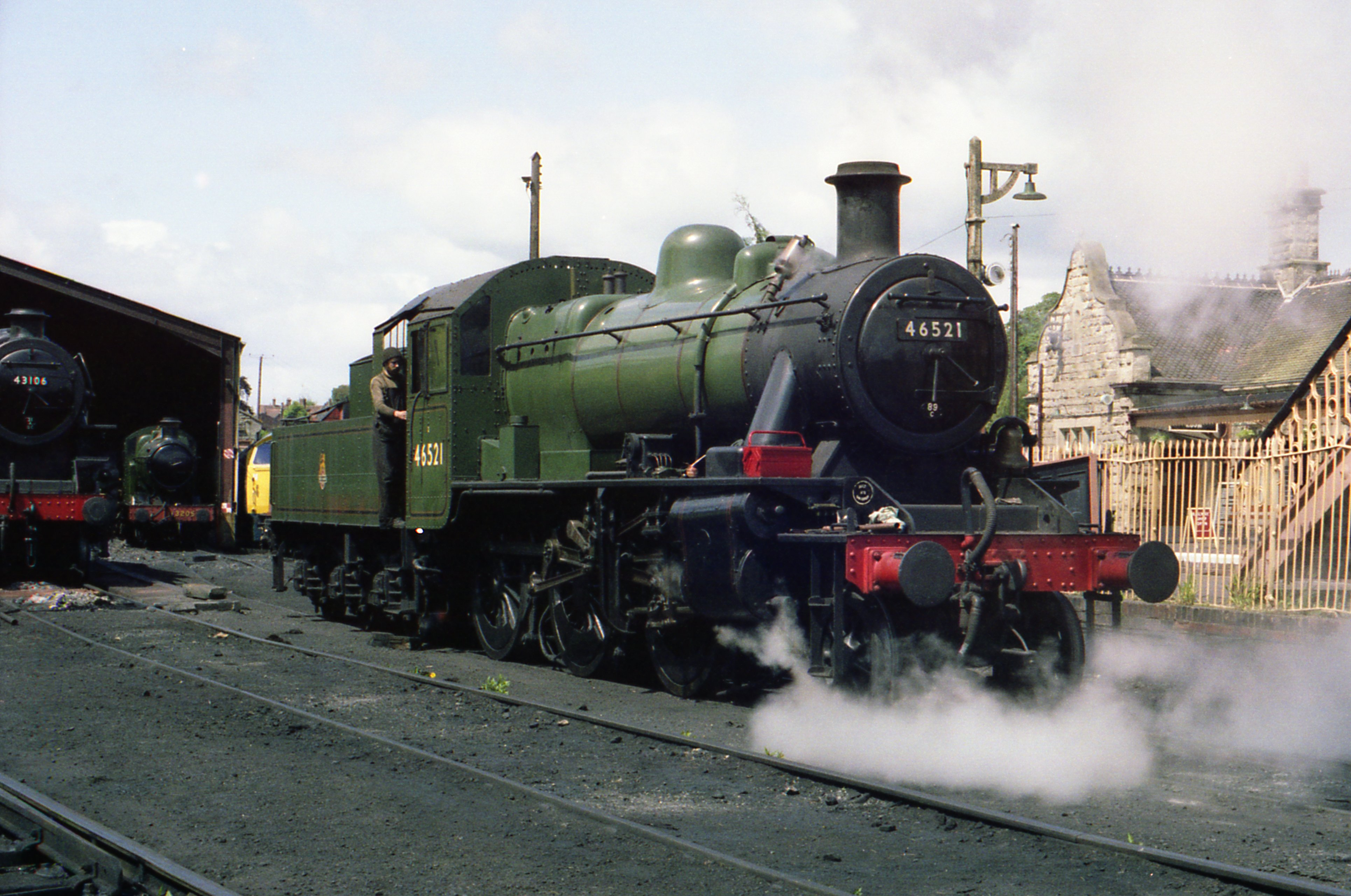
"Blossom", the locomotive featured in the series.

A pilot for the sitcom was produced and aired in 1995 and proved a success with viewers, leading the BBC to commission Croft and Spendlove to produce a series; though broadcast of the sitcom's first series was delayed for a year. Much of the sitcom's filming required exterior shots with a location that would fit in with the 1960s, leading production staff to make use of the Severn Valley Railway due to its preservation work, both for a LMS Ivatt Class 2 2-6-0 locomotive (No 46521), as well Arley railway station, though the cost for this meant that the BBC was required to provide a large budget for the sitcom compared to other programming at the time.

Much of the cast who featured in the series were recruited from Croft's previous work on both Hi-de-Hi! and You Rang, M'Lord?, with guest appearances from a number of Croft's other works with his former partner Jimmy Perry; Spendlove himself also made several appearances in the programme.

== Premise ==
Oh, Doctor Beeching! focuses on the small fictional branch line railway station of Hatley, which has been disorganised since the retirement of its previous station master. Jack Skinner, the station's porter, does what he can to keep the station operational as its acting station master, alongside his family, friends and colleagues, including his wife May, who runs the buffet; Gloria, the Skinners' daughter, who volunteers when not teaching lessons; Harry Lambert, who serves as the local signalman; Ethel Schumann, an eccentric and easily flustered booking clerk; Wilfred, Ethel's somewhat dimwitted son, who serves as the station dogsbody; and Vera Plumtree, a local volunteer whose husband worked on the railway. In addition, the station often provides a respite for a regular train crew consisting of engine driver Arnold Thomas, his inexperienced fireman Ralph (who is training to be a driver himself), and flirtatious train guard Percy, whom Ethel is besotted with at times.

By 1963, the station is deemed in need of improvement, so a new station master, Cecil Parkin, is sent to oversee this. Parkin is a stern, but keen man who wishes to bring the station up to standards. However, his arrival presents a dilemma for May, who had a romantic fling with him while dating Jack, before the couple's marriage, and that she has no idea that Parkin still loves her even after they parted ways around the time of the Second World War. From the first episode, after Parkin arrives, the station staff receive news of a story printed in the papers in which Dr Richard Beeching has written a report to the British government recommending the closure of many branch lines and rural stations, with Parkin deciding to do whatever he can to prove the station and the line can run efficiently (while secretly having meetings with May), despite Jack disliking his presence and ideas.

== Main cast ==
Cecil R. Parkin (Jeffrey Holland) Stationmaster – the new stationmaster at Hatley who appears midway through the first episode. He is a perfectionist and is determined to make the station the best on the line. On the surface, he seems refined, but it turns out that he knows the station's buffet manager because they had a passionate affair, which was going on behind her boyfriend (later husband) Jack Skinner's back. Parkin still has lecherous thoughts about her and in several episodes he tries his best to get her to leave Jack. The station staff react to him in different ways; most are tolerant of him, but Jack and Harry, the signalman, take an intense dislike to him, which only slightly mellows as the series goes on.

Jack Skinner (Paul Shane) Head Porter and Deputy Stationmaster – Skinner is deeply in love with his beautiful wife, May, but gets very jealous whenever she comes into close contact with other men, especially Cecil, whom he makes no secret of his dislike for. He is an ex-soldier with a limp from a wound he supposedly received during the war, but in episode 9 it is revealed that his leg was actually wounded when he was thrown out of a pub and the landlord's wife slammed the door on his foot, although Ethel changed the story to him jumping on a German tank to shove a land mine down it and a big German trapped his foot in the door.

Ethel Schumann (Su Pollard) Ticket Clerk – Schumann is scatter-brained and sometimes muddles her words. She often gets frustrated with Jack for his jealousy of May. She is also a flirt – she has a son from her marriage to a now deceased American soldier named Earl, whom she frequently refers to in the earlier episodes. She is desperate for another boyfriend and frequently makes advances towards the station's guard, Percy, who appreciates her advances, but seems more interested in the regular commuter, Amy. She is the only person May informs of her wartime fling with Cecil.

Harry Lambert (Stephen Lewis) Signalman – Lambert is the eternally miserable signalman who never smiles and often sees the down side of things. He hates his job and the "ruddy trains". Because few trains serve Hatley, he operates numerous illegal sidelines from his box: growing vegetables, mending bikes and clocks, rearing farm animals (pigs, turkeys and chickens) for the staff's dinners, giving haircuts and taking bets. The staff know about these sidelines but keep quiet as they are beneficiaries from them and Cecil would put a stop to them if he found out. There is a recurring gag, where Harry will say, "if they poke their noses around, they will get the flat end o' my tongue", that person comes and he starts sucking up to them. He often resists Vera's advances.

May Skinner (née Blanchflower) (Julia Deakin) Buffet Manageress – Skinner had a passionate affair with Cecil Parkin before she married Jack, which ended when Cecil was called up to serve in the Army. She appears to genuinely love Jack, but she seems to still have buried feelings for Cecil. She frequently resists Cecil's advances, but occasionally relents, even letting him kiss her in Episode 10, but states that it must never happen again. In early episodes it is hinted that Cecil is the father of her daughter, Gloria, but this is proved to be false in Episode 11. The character of May was played by Sherrie Hewson in the original pilot episode shown in August 1995. Because of her role in Coronation Street, Hewson was unable to continue with the role of May in the series proper, so the character was recast to Julia Deakin. When the pilot episode was repeated as the first episode of the first series in July 1996, Hewson's scenes as May were reshot with Deakin in the role.

Vera Plumtree (Barbara New) Cleaner – She helps the staff by cleaning their homes and washing linen for them. She has a lot in common with Ethel: she muddles her words and frequently talks about her unnamed late husband, who was an engine driver. She is fond of Harry, but he is not interested in her.

Wilfred Schumann (Paul Aspden, credited as Paul Aspen) Porter – Ethel's son. Most of the time he comes across as extremely stupid. He is often verbally abused and hit around the head by Jack. Wilfred joins the Army in one episode so as to allow Ethel to elope with her new American airmen boyfriend, but she ends the relationship. Wilfred was born in 1946, making him 17.

Gloria Skinner (Lindsay Grimshaw) – Jack and May's daughter. A rebellious teenager, very fond of short skirts and the company of older men. Jack is over-protective and will let no man in the station take Gloria out. Gloria was born in February 1945, making her 18.

Percy (Terry John) Guard – the main station flirt. He flirts with every woman he comes into contact with, except Vera. But he seems to prefer Amy above others: he takes her out on several dates during the series, often leaving Ethel in the lurch. It is said in Episode 14 that he keeps promising to take Ethel out, but never does.

Arnold Thomas (Ivor Roberts) Train Driver – An older train driver. He is the star of the penultimate episode, where he goes to great lengths to make sure he is not sacked. He has a wife called Jessica, who appears to be forgetful. He alludes to her in almost every episode, but she only appears briefly in an uncredited role in Episode 13. The actress was Ivor Roberts' real life wife also.

Ralph (Perry Benson) Fireman and Trainee Driver – Ralph works with Arnold and the two often engage in comic banter. Ralph can be as daft as Wilfred and is slow at learning to drive – but he drives the train perfectly in the final episode. One episode centres around him – in Episode 14 he threatens to go on strike. It is also revealed that he has a crush on Gloria.

Amy (Tara Daniels), best school friend of Gloria's, she appears in most of the episodes. She is often the object of Percy's desires.

Mr Orkindale (Richard Spendlove) District Inspector – Senior to Parkin, calls staff by Christian names and fancies May. Dislikes Mr Parkin as much as everyone else and in Episode 17 cheats him out of a place on the bowls club outing just so he can have a few extra drinks.

=== Guest appearances ===
Other actors who had previously collaborated with David Croft made guest appearances in the series. Former Hi-de-Hi! regular Felix Bowness made a number of appearances as relief train guard Bernie Bleasdale. Windsor Davies appeared in the final episode as the mayor of Clumberfield, when the station staff re-enacted the station's opening for its 100th anniversary. James Pertwee, son of the actor Bill Pertwee, also made an appearance as a photographer in this final episode. Sally Grace appeared in Episode 7 as Mr Parkin's fiancée, Edna. Hugh Lloyd made an appearance in one episode as a chauffeur.

== Title and music ==
The title is a reference to the 1892 music hall song "Oh! Mr Porter" and the 1937 Will Hay film Oh, Mr Porter!. A modified version of the song was sung during the end credits by actress Su Pollard:

Oh, Dr Beeching what have you done?
There once were lots of trains to catch, but soon there will be none,
I'll have to buy a bike, 'cos I can't afford a car,
Oh, Dr Beeching what a naughty man you are!

== Episodes ==
=== Series overview ===
Series	Episodes	Originally released	
Series	Episodes	First released	Last released
Pilot		14 August 1995	
1	9	1 July 1996	27 August 1996
2	10	29 June 1997	28 September 1997

=== Pilot (1995) ===
No. overall	No. in series	Title	Directed by	Written by	Original release date
1	-	"Pilot"	Roy Gould	David Croft and Richard Spendlove	14 August 1995
In 1963, Hatley station comes under the supervision of a new efficient station master, Cecil Parkin. To his surprise, he finds the station buffet is run by his former lover May Blanchflower, who is now married to station porter Jack Skinner, and has a daughter she hints could be Cecil's. As staff prepare for his regime, news soon arrives about Dr Beeching's plans for Britain's railways that could leave Hatley under threat of possible closure. Note: Sherrie Hewson portrayed the character of May in the pilot; when the series was produced, the actress was replaced by Julia Deakin. The plot of the pilot would be re-used for the episode "All Change" when the series was officially produced.

=== Series 1 (1996) ===
No. overall	No. in series	Title	Directed by	Written by	Original release date
2	1	"All Change"	Roy Gould	David Croft and Richard Spendlove	1 July 1996
3	2	"Talking Turkey"	Roy Gould	David Croft and Richard Spendlove	8 July 1996
Parkin faces his first real test when Hatley's signalman, Harry Lambert, panics and has to stop a train from running over a turkey he was raising for next Christmas dinner. Not impressed, Parkin intends to hold a meeting to discuss what to do, leaving Harry concerned over the future of his side businesses he runs between signalling for trains, including hairdressing, greengrocery, and betting.
4	3	"The Train Now Standing…"	Roy Gould	David Croft and Richard Spendlove	15 July 1996
Parkin decides that Hatley should become a more sophisticated station, and requests its speaker system be re-established, despite Jack now believing it may work. After he proves ineffective for making announcements with it, Parkin asks Ethel Schumann to handle it. While she proves reliable, the system becomes a handful when Jack reveals the speakers are not working, and trying to rectify it just makes things worse.
5	4	"A Moving Story"	Roy Gould	David Croft and Richard Spendlove	22 July 1996
The station staff are asked by Parkin to help him with moving his furniture into the Station Master's house, after it arrives in Hatley. As they help out, Ethel's neighbour Vera Plumtree arranges a bath for Parkin to enjoy upon settling in. Meanwhile, May is forced to confess to Ethel her involvement with the station master, leaving her friend with a moral dilemma to deal with.
6	5	"The Late Mr Buckly"	Roy Gould	David Croft and Richard Spendlove	29 July 1996
Jack is surprised when a coffin arrives at Hatley containing the body of one Mr Buckly. To his annoyance, Ethel's son Wilfred burned a delivery note that could help them know what to do with it. Until the coffin can be collected, Jack attempts to keep it out of sight of passengers, as well as Parkin, which soon creates a whirlwind of problems.
7	6	"Horse Play"	Roy Gould	David Croft and Richard Spendlove	5 August 1996
Wilfred fails to properly manage one of Harry's signals, causing its light box wick to catch fire and chaos to unfold in fixing it. Parkin buys expensive lingerie for May to express his continued love for her, but Ethel has to lie to Jack about the present when Vera mentions this to him. Hatley is expecting a horse to arrive at the station, but are shocked when a lion turns up instead.
8	7	"Past Love"	Roy Gould	John Stevenson	12 August 1996
Harry asks the staff to help him conceal a pig at the station, having brought it in for their Christmas dinner without Parkin's knowledge. Fortunately, the station master has to head off for a meeting, but while away, Ethel is surprised when his fiancée, tax inspector Edna Taylor, turns up to check up on him since their engagement six years ago. When she finds letters he wrote, Edna is determined to confront him over a love affair he might be having.
9	8	"Job Opportunity"	Roy Gould	John Stevenson	19 August 1996
May gets a surprise when she is offered a job at Loxley station's refreshment room by its manager Fred Foster. After she leaves for her interview, both Jack and Parkin agree they do not want her to go, and eagerly seek to sabotage her plans when she seeks to impress with her own buffet work. Harry is just as interested to meet Fred, as he was the man who caused Harry's wife to leave him several years ago.
10	9	"Sleeping Around"	Roy Gould	David Croft and Richard Spendlove	27 August 1996
Jack and May's daughter, Gloria, chastises Parkin when he gets her to respect her father more, after she and a friend are found to have spent the night in his house. Meanwhile, as Hatley's staff prepare for the annual Saturday dance in town, Jack is shocked when he finds the railway's head office intends to have him undergo a medical examination for a leg condition, even though he has been exaggerating it since World War II.

=== Series 2 (1997) ===
No. overall	No. in series	Title	Directed by	Written by	Original release date
11	1	"No Milk for the Minister"	Roy Gould	David Croft and Richard Spendlove	29 June 1997
There is a crisis when May has no milk in her buffet and the Minister of Transport decides to pay a visit. Mr Parkin has installed a "Position Closed" sign in the booking office, which Ethel has trouble getting to grips with. Mr Skinner sets out to get revenge on Mr Parkin when the latter suggests that he take the day off following his drastic overreaction to Mr Parkin's solution to the milk problem.
12	2	"Father's Day"	Roy Gould	David Croft and Richard Spendlove	6 July 1997
May is placed in an awful predicament when Parkin makes clear he wants to be a part of Gloria's life, despite the fact there is no clear evidence he could be her father. She later confides in Ethel the situation she is in, only for May to learn Jack has become highly suspicious of Parkin's behaviour to her and intends to make his life a misery through any means he wishes to use.
13	3	"The Gravy Train"	Roy Gould	Paul Minett and Brian Leveson	13 July 1997
Jack is surprised when he comes across a suitcase dumped by the track after a train pulls in. When he opens it, he finds it contains hundreds of five pound notes, and is eager to spend some on gambling. May becomes concerned for his freedom when Percy, the train's guard, reveals a group of forgers were arrested by the police on the train, and that they are trying to find the forged notes they were supposed to be carrying with them.
14	4	"The Van"	Roy Gould	David Croft and Richard Spendlove	20 July 1997
Parkin informs the Hatley staff that he has been appointed by the railways to be the Station Master of three smaller stations on their line, and has been given a railway van for this job. Unfortunately, he cannot drive, and the van is rather a problematic vehicle when Jack and Ethel ask to use it for some minor jobs. Then the pair have to take along Arnold, a local train driver, back home when he fears something has happened to his wife.
15	5	"Lucky Strike"	Roy Gould	John Chapman	27 July 1997
Local train fireman Ralph is placed in an awkward position when his uncle informs him he intends to start up strike action, despite the local union not approving of this. Parkin is not happy to learn of this, and reveals he intends to fire anyone who goes along with this, leading Arnold to seek help in convincing his fireman against it. This leads May to convince Gloria and Jack to make allowances that can convince Ralph to change his mind.
16	6	"Love is a Very Splendid Thing"	Roy Gould	David Croft and Richard Spendlove	17 August 1997
Ethel returns to Hatley in a blissful mood, singing one of the hit songs from a musical she had watched at the cinema. She confides in May that she has become smitten with an American airman and is contemplating a future with them. While the Hatley staff are concerned for her wellbeing, Wilfred is not too happy and decides to join the army to try to impress his mother. But both soon receive news that upends their plans. Notes: Guest stars Mac McDonald.
17	7	"Action Stations"	Roy Gould	John Stevenson	7 September 1997
Parkin is surprised when a chauffeur for Lady Lawrence informs them that his employer is to come to the station to meet Dr Beeching. Naturally, he is eager for the station to make a good impression, and so has the Hatley staff spruce up everything, before arranging a rehearsal session to ensure everyone knows what to do when their VIP turns up, unaware her ladyship is meeting someone else. Notes: Guest stars Hugh Lloyd
18	8	"A Bowl in the Hand"	Roy Gould	John Chapman	14 September 1997
May gets accidentally left behind when the staff head off for the annual Hatley Bowls Club outing, except for Parkin, who delights in this. Ethel soon notices but fails to prevent Jack learning of this. Fuelled by his jealousy, he is soon trying to find a way to get home fast, even if it means taking control of the train, much to Ethel's displeasure when she serves the outing's buffet car. Notes: This episode was originally scheduled for broadcast on 31 August 1997, but had to be postponed in the wake of the death of Diana, Princess of Wales, after the BBC suspended most of their programming that day to provide extensive live news coverage of her death.
19	9	"A Pregnant Pause"	Roy Gould	Paul Minett and Brian Leveson	21 September 1997
Following an awkward day of training to become accustomed to driving diesel locomotives, Arnold gets a call from head office and assumes he is going to be fired, leading him to take drastic steps to ensure this does not happen. Meanwhile, May confides in Jack that she thinks she is pregnant, leaving her husband concerned about whether the time is right for them to have another baby.
20	10	"Ton Up"	Roy Gould	David Croft and Richard Spendlove	28 September 1997
After Wilfred finds an old newspaper concerning the station, Parkin discovers that Hatley station is about to mark the 100th anniversary of its opening. As such, he arranges a celebration, including period clothing for the staff, and Hatley's mayor attending proceedings with the newspaper covering the event. But the planned street party certainly is a trumpeting success in a way, when Jack fails to secure the meat for a barbeque. Notes: Guest stars Windsor Davies as the Mayor.

== Home media releases ==
The first series was released on VHS and DVD in 2004, while the second series on DVD only, in 2005. The packaging of the first series misleadingly stated that it "included the pilot"; in reality, it contained the revised first episode and not the original version of the pilot. Edits are made to certain episodes because of copyright music issues.

A complete box set containing both series and all 19 episodes (also including the original pilot) was made available, distributed by Acorn Media UK in 2009. It was later discontinued, but it was made available again in 2017.
