= Listen to Les =

Listen to Les is a long-running comedy sketch show on BBC Radio 2 starring Les Dawson, which was written and produced by James Casey (variety artist). The show was broadcast on BBC Radio 2, with the first episode airing on 11 August 1974, and it ran until 17 March 1985.

Dawson performed various deadpan monologues and played in a number of recurring character sketches including "At Home with the Desponds", "The Sophisticates" and "Cissy and Ada" supported by other performers including Daphne Oxenford, Colin Edwynn, Roy Barraclough and Eli Woods, with additional 'juvenile' roles voiced by local radio personalities Tony Filer and Chris Buckley.

Every show ended with Dawson calling upon the studio audience to join him in a singalong with a popular or classic song, which he would deliberately play badly at the piano, to great comic effect.
