= Stephen Woodcock =

Stephen Woodcock may refer to:

- Steven Woodcock (born 1964), English actor
- Stephen Woodcock (politician), New Hampshire politician
- Steven Woodcock (film director) (born 1961), British film director, writer, and producer
