= Daphne Oxenford =

English actress (1919–2012)

- Oxenford presenting Listen with Mother at the BBC in 1950
- Born: Daphne Margaret du Grivel Oxenford; 31 October 1919; North Finchley, Middlesex, England
- Died: 21 December 2012 (aged 93); Northwood, London, England
- Resting place: Breakspear Crematorium, Ruislip, London, England
- Education: Embassy Theatre
- Occupation: Actress
- Years active: 1949–2008
- Spouse: David Marshall (m. 1951; died 2003)
- Children: 2

Daphne Margaret du Grivel Oxenford (31 October 1919 – 21 December 2012) was an English actress, known for her early stage roles, and later her radio and television work. She was the voice ("Are you sitting comfortably ...?") of BBC radio's Listen with Mother from its inception in 1950 to 1971.

She was part of the original cast of ITV TV series soap opera Coronation Street in 1960, playing the role of spinster Esther Hayes, and appearing during the first three years of the show (with subsequent guest returns).

Oxenford also had notable TV guest roles including the sitcom Man About the House (1973) as Mrs. Plummer and in EastEnders (1990) as Alice Dutton, and featured in the mini-series The Children of Green Knowe (1986), as Mrs. Oldknow.

== Early life and early career ==
Oxenford was born in North Finchley, England on 31 October 1919, to chartered accountant Dudley Oxenford and his wife Marie (née du Grivel), a writer of historical fiction.

== Early career ==
She first appeared on stage at the age of thirteen and trained at the Embassy School of Acting in Swiss Cottage, North London. She was briefly employed by a bank before working in censorship during World War II while performing in revues in her spare time. At the end of the war she toured with ENSA before returning to revues in London.

After her marriage she moved to Manchester and appeared regularly at the Library Theatre and the Royal Exchange Theatre as well as in the West End. In 1947 she successfully auditioned for Joyce Grenfell, who became a close friend and godmother to Oxenford's daughter.

== Radio and television ==
Among her most high-profile roles was the voice – "Are you sitting comfortably ...?" – for BBC radio's Listen with Mother from 1950 to 1971; she was also a reader on the newspaper review programme What the Papers Say for more than thirty years. One of the original cast members of Coronation Street, she played Esther Hayes from 1960 to 1963, 1971 and 1972. She played Mrs Patterson, the owner of the village shop, in the popular sitcom To the Manor Born. In the 1970s and early 1980s, she was part of Listen to Les The Les Dawson Radio Show on Radio 2, and performed in The Clitheroe Kid radio comedy series from time to time. She played Chrissy's mother in three episodes of Man About the House (1973–76).

Other TV credits include: The Sweeney, The Duchess of Duke Street, Yanks Go Home, Juliet Bravo, Drop The Dead Donkey, The Children of Green Knowe and Hetty Wainthropp Investigates. She also voiced several of the female kid characters in Cosgrove Hall's The Wind in the Willows. In 1987 she appeared in the Doctor Who serial Dragonfire. She filmed a scene as an elderly Agatha Christie for the 2008 episode The Unicorn and the Wasp, but was cut from the final broadcast version, though it later featured on the DVD release. In 2006, she guest-starred in the audio drama Sapphire and Steel: Cruel Immortality. She appeared in three episodes of Midsomer Murders (2004–2008) as Muriel, Cully's grandmother. Her film credits include That'll Be the Day (1973), All Creatures Great and Small (1975) and Sweet William (1980). Her voice was used for a Listen With Mother programme in 1977 for the sitcom Rising Damp.

== Personal life ==
Oxenford lived at The Close off Wainwright Road, Altrincham, for 50 years. She was married to David Marshall from 1951 until his death in February 2003. They had two daughters, one of whom, Sophie Marshall, was a former casting director at the Royal Exchange Theatre. Following the death of her husband, she lived at Denville Hall, where she died on 21 December 2012, aged 93.
