= Who Killed Lamb? =

- Genre: Drama
- Created by: Michael Zagor and Anthony Skene
- Written by: Anthony Skene
- Directed by: David Cunliffe
- Starring: Stanley Baker; Denis Lill; David Swift; Derek Francis; Barbara Leigh-Hunt; Simon Turner; Peter Sallis; Eve Karpf
- Country of origin: United Kingdom
- Original language: English
- No. of episodes: 1

Production
- Running time: 65 minutes

Original release
- Network: ITV
- Release: 16 March 1974

Who Killed Lamb? is a 1974 TV play starring Stanley Baker as a Scotland Yard detective investigating a murder in Oxford. It was made by Yorkshire Television in association with David Paradine Productions Ltd. for ITV, and was screened on 16 March 1974.

== Plot ==
Octavius Lamb, a member of the Oxford community is killed, and nobody can think why. A police inspector named Detective Inspector Jamieson is called in to solve the case and asks everyone who knew Octavius and his family. He asks many people to see if they know anything about his death such as his wife, his son, his janitor and the people that worked for his business.

== Cast ==
- Stanley Baker as Detective Inspector Jamieson
- Denis Lill as Sgt. Beck
- David Swift as Insp. Havelock
- Derek Francis as Octavius Lamb
- Barbara Leigh-Hunt as Madeleine
- Simon Turner as Steven
- Peter Sallis as Lloyd
- Eve Karpf as Miss Compton
- Cheryl Hall as Amy
- Mona Hammond as Nurse
- Melinda Sheridan as Receptionist
- Miles Anderson as P.C. Hanworth
- Dennis Blanch as P.C. York
- Colin Edwynn as Michael
- Anthony Roye as Doctor Robson
- Ingrid Hafner as Mary
- Gillian Raine as Miss Bennett
- John Challis as Casson
- Bruce Boa as Professor Friedland
- Artro Morris as Mr. Humber
- Anthony Bailey as Sgt. Latimer
- Cyril Shaps as Mr. Lavender
- Sheelagh Wilcocks as Mrs. Lavender
- Michael Hawkins as Bardon

== DVD release ==
The play is included on the 2007 Network DVD release of the film Hell Drivers, which also starred Stanley Baker. It is also included on the 2008 Network DVD release of Thriller (1973–1976), as Who Killed Lamb? was incorrectly billed on 16 March 1974 as being an episode of Thriller on ITV.
