= Andrew Dunn (actor) =

British actor

- Born: Leeds, West Riding of Yorkshire, England
- Occupation: Actor
- Years active: 1986–present
- Spouse: Andrina Caroll
- Children: 1

Andrew Dunn is an English actor, possibly best known for his roles of Kevin Butcher in the ITV crime drama The Knock from 1994 until 1997, and the role of Tony in the BBC sitcom dinnerladies between 1998 and 2000. He later played Roger Stiles in Coronation Street from 2007 to 2008. He was born in Leeds, West Riding of Yorkshire, but was brought up in North Shields, eight miles (13 km) east of Newcastle upon Tyne, before leaving for London at the age of 20. He trained as a teacher but decided he wanted to act. He later moved to York.

== Early life ==
He was born in Leeds, but then the family moved to North Shields when he was nine. He attended Whitehouse Primary School and then Marden High School in Cullercoats, and then Tynemouth Sixth Form College, where he became interested in drama.

== Career ==
Dunn has appeared in numerous television series including perhaps his best known roles to date, Kevin Butcher in The Knock and as Tony in dinnerladies. In addition he has also appeared in The Bill, Holby City, 55 Degrees North, Heartbeat, and Coronation Street in 2003. He had a lead role playing Hardy in the British feature film Between Two Women (2000) and also appeared in the British feature film The Jealous God (2005).

In December 2006, Dunn rejoined the cast of Coronation Street as Roger Stiles, a plumber and new love interest for Janice Battersby. On 29 September 2008, it was announced Dunn had been axed from Coronation Street; he made his final appearance on 8 October 2008.

From 1999 until at least 2006, Dunn played the recurring role of Alastair Campbell in the political satire Bremner, Bird & Fortune. Dunn reprised his role as Alastair Campbell in the BBC Radio 4 play The Iraq Dossier, written by David Morley, which was broadcast on 2 March 2013.

Dunn joined previous cast members of dinnerladies in March 2009 to perform a stage version of the hit show.

Dunn received an honorary degree of letters from York St John University on 13 November 2009.

Dunn appeared in the BBC series Doctors on 24 March 2011, playing Owain Brumpton. In September 2014, Dunn began playing the role of Gerald in the touring production of The Full Monty.

== Filmography ==
=== Television ===
Year	Title	Role	Notes
1987	The Ritz	Skodge	6 episodes
1992	London's Burning	"Two Rods" Eddie	Episode: "#5.1"
1994–1997	The Knock	Kevin Butcher	27 episodes
1998–2000	dinnerladies	Tony Martin	
2003	Midsomer Murders	Constable Crabbe	Episode: "The Green Man"
2003	Gifted	DC Fairchild	Television film
2003	Doctor Who: Scream of the Shalka	Max	
2004	No Angels	Mr. Morgan	Episode: "#1.1"
2004–2005	55 Degrees North	Police Sergeant Rick Astel	14 episodes
2005–2018	Doctors	Owain Brumpton, P.C. Mickey Bell, Des Broad, Dennis Hewitt, Tom Bowyer, Geoff Aspland, Martin Lightfoot	8 episodes
2006	Bremner, Bird and Fortune	Alistair Campbell	Episode: "#9.1"
2006	Dalziel and Pascoe	Jack Farraday	Episode: "Glory Days"
2006	Blue Murder	Eddie Carter	Episode: "Steady Eddie"
2007–2008	Coronation Street	Roger Stiles	66 episodes
2010	Law & Order: UK	Martin Douglas	Episode: "Masquerade"
2011	My Family	Martin	Episode: "Darts All, Folks"
2026	Dear England	Sam Allardyce	1 episode

=== Film ===
Year	Title	Role	Notes
2000	Between Two Women	Geoff Hardy	
2002	Ali G Indahouse	Police Officer	
2005	The Jealous God	Matthew	
2007	Popcorn	Max	
2009	Mr. Right	Alex's Father	

=== Theatre ===
- dinnerladies – 2009, stage adaptation of the popular BBC sitcom, York Theatre Royal and the Darlington Civic Theatre
- 'Art' – 2006, York Theatre Royal
- iShandy – 2013, York Theatre Royal
- The Railway Children – 2015, Kings Cross Theatre

=== Video games ===
- Xenoblade Chronicles 3 as Consul O
