= Alec Gilroy =

Fictional character from Coronation Street

- Coronation Street character
- Portrayed by: Roy Barraclough
- Duration: 1972, 1975, 1986–1992, 1995–1998
- First appearance: Episode 1194; 26 June 1972
- Last appearance: Episode 4534; 30 December 1998
- Introduced by: Eric Prytherch (1972); Susi Hush (1975); Bill Podmore (1986); Sue Pritchard (1995); Brian Park (1996)
- Book appearances: Coronation Street: The Complete Saga
In-universe information
- Occupation: Wine Bar Owner; Pub landlord
- Father: Reg Gilroy
- Mother: Mabel Gilroy
- Sisters: Edna Gilroy
- Half-sisters: Brenda Gilroy
- Wife: Joyce Crosby (backstory); Bet Lynch (1987–1999)
- Daughters: Sandra Arden
- Granddaughters: Vicky McDonald

Alec Gilroy is a fictional character from the British ITV soap opera Coronation Street, played by Roy Barraclough. The character made several appearances in the show as a small-time talent agent, the first in 1972, and later as a series regular from 1986 to 1992. He reappeared briefly in July 1995, and returned for a longer stint between April 1996 and December 1998. Alec is best known for his tempestuous marriage to long-running character Bet Lynch (Julie Goodyear).

== Development ==
=== Departure (1992) ===
In 1988, with his contract due to expire, Barraclough decided to quit the programme, citing typecasting as a reason for his departure. His exit storyline was in early planning stages when he had a surprise change of heart, as Bill Podmore recalls: "He insisted on leaving before he became better known as Alec Gilroy than Roy Barraclough, and all my efforts to dissuade him failed. Suddenly, out of the blue, he had a change of heart and the scriptwriters were spared the task of inventing a plausible exit for Alec. Barraclough references this in a 1990 interview: "For the foreseeable future, I will continue playing Alec because I'm enjoying it, but two years ago I thought I was going to pack it all in. The actor's instinct is to do it, move on and tackle another challenge. With soap, once you have established the character, it's just a case of learning a different situation each week. There's nothing else to explore. But Granada outlined all sorts of interesting ideas they had to develop the character and it sounded smashing."

Barraclough remained non-committal about his future with Coronation Street, a situation not helped by the addition of a third weekly episode in October 1989. Barraclough said: "It's damned hard work. If you're featured prominently in a storyline for five or six weeks, the pressure begins to get to you and the strain really starts to tell. It's very much bed and work. At the moment it's OK, but one could foresee a time when it could all get too much. I spent my life permanently tense." In 1992, Barraclough quit the Street, and this time he did not change his mind. Although he expressed a desire for Alec to be killed off, writers instead chose to send him away to Southampton to resume his entertainment career, believing that Bet's new status as a separated woman had dramatic potential.

=== Reintroduction and final departure ===
When Julie Goodyear decided to leave her role as Bet Lynch after 25 years in 1995, Roy Barraclough was persuaded to return as Alec for a storyline which saw the Gilroys reunite to stop Vicky marrying Steve McDonald. The story saw Bet and Alec pick up where they left off, entertaining viewers with their bickering one last time. Alec next appeared in direct-to-video Coronation Street - The Feature Length Special, also in 1995, before returning to the regular programme full-time from April 1996 onwards. In September 1998, tabloids carried the story of Barraclough's resignation from the Street, with the Daily Mirror carrying a quote from the actor: "It's true I've told them I want to go at the end of my six-month contract. It's hard work these days and I've just completed a 19-week stint at the studios." His final episode aired in December 1998. Barraclough ruled out a return to the soap in 2012 stating: "You can't go back and recreate it, because it was a special time on the Street, it was heavily focused on comedy back then and all that has changed. You could be a bit of a caricature if you went back now." He later stated in 2014: "I don't watch the show, it has changed so much now from what it was, it doesn't have a hold on me like it used to. The characters have changed and it has drifted away from what it used to be, there was a lot of comedy then."

== Storylines ==
Alec is introduced as the manager of a Working Men's Club, but soon progresses to being a theatrical agent with acts such as Rita Littlewood (Barbara Knox) under his control. In 1986, Alec takes over the Graffiti Club on Rosamund Street, which enjoys increased trade, due to the fire at the Rovers Return. Through this, Alec meets Bet Lynch (Julie Goodyear). It was after meeting Bet, that Alec becomes a regular in Coronation Street. Bet and Alec eventually marry, and jointly take over the running of The Rovers Return. The relationship between the couple sometimes struggles due to Alec's greed and desire to better himself, however the couple gets closer again after Bet has a miscarriage in early 1988.

Alec is mugged in September 1988, which causes Bet to wonder if he is operating an insurance fiddle. Cecil Newton (Kenneth Alan Taylor) and the police suspect the same, but on this occasion Alec has been telling the truth. He is deeply hurt that nobody believes him. Alec and Bet have a falling out with the brewery in 1990 and are temporarily evicted but later return to the relief of the regulars. In 1991, Alec finds out his daughter Sandra and her husband Tim, have been killed in a car crash leaving their only daughter Vicky an orphan. Alec and Bet are appointed Vicky's legal guardians and, much to Alec's relief, Bet treats Vicky as a daughter and they form a close bond. Vicky later visits the street during the summer holidays and forms a relationship with Steve MacDonald which both Alec and Bet disapprove of.

In mid-1992, Alec is offered a senior position with Sunliners Cruises; he consults Bet and they initially agree to sell the pub back to the brewery and move down to Southampton. In early September, Bet gets cold feet and backs out to stay on as manager of The Rovers to which Alec is furious, eventually leaving without her in front of the whole pub. Bet is heartbroken and pines after Alec for some time.

Alec later returns in July 1995 to visit his granddaughter Vicky (Chloe Newsome), revealing that he is now the regional manager of Sunliners. Alec still disapproves of Vicky's fiancé, Steve McDonald (Simon Gregson), believing that Steve is only after Vicky because of her money. Alec tries to bribe Steve into calling the wedding off and leaving Vicky, but is unsuccessful. Vicky severs ties with her grandfather and leaves for St. Lucia with Steve where they marry. Alec refuses to say goodbye to them and returns to Southampton, although he patches up his relationship with Bet and they part as friends.

Alec then returns permanently in April 1996, to support Vicky when she goes on trial with Steve, for conspiracy to pervert the course of justice. In May 1997 he is made redundant from Sunliners. This doesn't keep Alec down for too long, however, as he begins a partnership with Jack (Bill Tarmey) and Vera Duckworth (Liz Dawn) at The Rovers Return, since Alec helps bail Jack and Vera out of a VAT bill.

In July 1998, Alec saves Rita's (Barbara Knox) life after discovering her unconscious from carbon monoxide poisoning in her flat, due to a faulty gas fire that Steve had fitted. The two subsequently become close, and Alec proposes to Rita. She accepts the proposal and when they both get cold feet, Alec decides to fit a door between their adjoining flats. They are both happy with the arrangement, ignoring the sniggers from other residents of the street.

Relations between Alec and the Duckworths soon become very strained and they finally agree to dissolve their partnership, with Alec paying £30,000 for Jack and Vera's share of the business. However, Alec allows them to continue living and working at the Rovers. This arrangement doesn't work out, and when Jack and Vera want to spend Christmas in Blackpool, Alec refuses. They ignore him and still go, causing Alec to change the locks. Rita thinks that Alec has gone too far, contacting the Duckworths in Blackpool and apologising. A three-day siege takes place, with no one willing to back down. When Alec discovers it was Rita who phoned the Duckworths, he feels totally betrayed, and shows that money meant far more to him than affection, ending their relationship. To Rita's dismay Alec boards up the doorway between their flats.

When Vicky unexpectedly turns up at Christmas 1998, it gives Alec the chance to contemplate his life and reassess his priorities. Alec suggests to Vicky that he can go into partnership with her, at her new wine bar in Brighton. Alec jumps at the chance to get away, selling the Rovers to Natalie Barnes (Denise Welch), and leaving the street.

== Reception ==
The character has been described as "squat and snivelling", and not one of the "better choices" of Bet. He has also been described as being "Bet's long-suffering inamorata".
