= Mother-in-law joke =

Comedy trope focused on a mother-in-law

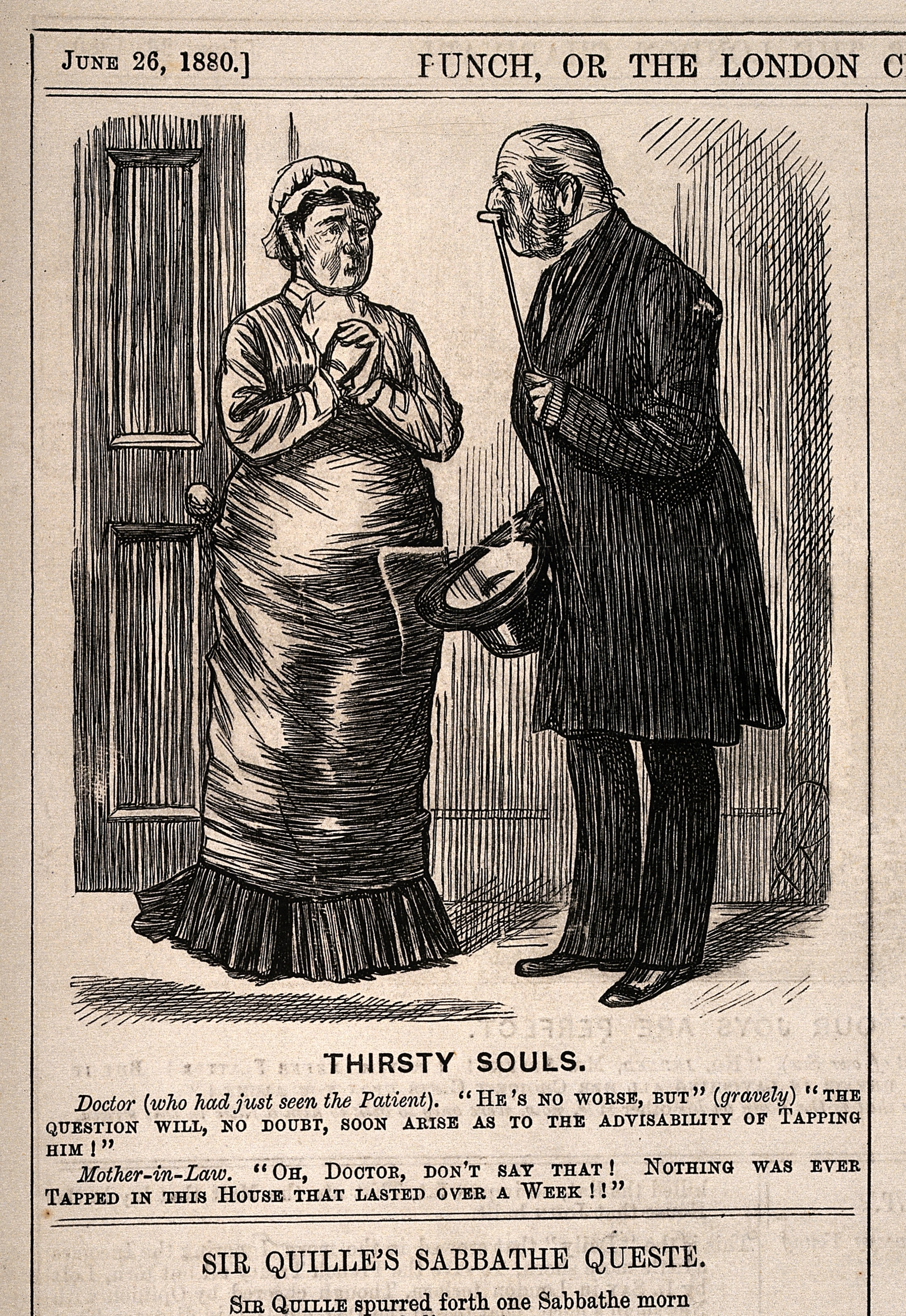
A doctor informs his patient's mother-in-law that he may need to resort to tapping – she misunderstands him as meaning tapping alcohol. Wood engraving by Charles Keene, 1880.

Humour and jokes about one's mother-in-law (the mother of one's spouse) are a mainstay of comedy. The humour is based on the premise that the average mother-in-law considers her son-in-law to be unsuitable for her daughter (or daughter-in-law unsuitable for her son) and may be rude, overbearing, obnoxious, and unattractive.

British comedians such as Les Dawson and Jim Davidson have often used them, and many television sitcoms have featured stereotypical mothers-in-law.

There is evidence that this joke dates back to Roman times: Satire VI by Juvenal says that one cannot be happy while one's mother-in-law is still alive. Most of the mother-in-law jokes are easily translatable to other languages and are easily understandable in most European cultures.

In a book on cartooning written by Dave Breger, the author lists a series of "tired gags", and gives a suggestion on how to exploit them. In his illustration, Breger and his wife go to a museum and see a Tyrannosaurus skeleton. Mrs. Breger says, "And no funny remarks, please, about that Mother called or something..."

A study of mothers-in-law by Pamela Cotterill found that "they tended not to be upset by jokes because they seemed so far fetched they couldn't apply to them, but they didn't find them funny". Cotterill also found that daughters-in-law did not find them funny either, largely because they saw that one day the jokes could be applied to them.

The jokes are considered offensive by some. A widely reported case is that of the London borough where, in 2010, a workshop leaflet called "Cultural Awareness: General Problems" advised against using them. The leaflet states that "mother-in-law jokes, as well as offensively sexist in their own right, can also be seen as offensive on the grounds that they disrespect elders or parents."

== Portrayals ==
The stereotype is often portrayed on film and in popular entertainment. Some examples include:

- Viola Fields (Jane Fonda) in the film Monster-in-Law.
- Marie Barone (Doris Roberts) in the sitcom Everybody Loves Raymond, who is extremely meddlesome and incessantly makes conceited remarks to her daughter-in-law Debra.
- Adele Delfino (Celia Weston) on the television series Desperate Housewives.
- Endora (Agnes Moorehead) in the sitcom Bewitched is a witch who is not happy with the decision of her daughter to marry a normal human, and often insults her son-in-law Darrin or places spells on him with her magic.
- Norma Speakman (Liz Smith) in the sitcom The Royle Family, who enjoys baiting son-in-law Jim.
- Olivia Jefferson (Zara Cully) in the sitcom The Jeffersons often puts down her daughter-in-law Louise.
- Mrs. Marcus (Ethel Merman) in the film It's a Mad, Mad, Mad, Mad World frequently berates her son-in-law, Russell Finch (Milton Berle), complains almost constantly, and annoys most of the other characters in the film.
- Mrs. Gibson (Ethel Owen) in various episodes of the TV show The Honeymooners frequently insults her son-in-law Ralph by making jokes about his weight, telling Alice about other men who have courted her before she married Ralph in front of him and saying things that make him mad enough that he shouts at her to get out of the house.
- Pearl Slaghoople in the animated series The Flintstones often ponders why her daughter Wilma had to marry Fred Flintstone.
- Madge Harvey (Sheila Reid) in the sitcom Benidorm frequently irritates her son-in-law Mick.

== Other ==
The plant Dracaena trifasciata is sometimes referred to as "mother-in-law's tongue".

== See also ==
- Maternal insult
- "Mother-in-Law (song)", a 1961 song written by Allen Toussaint and performed by Ernie K-Doe
