= Richard Spendlove =

British radio presenter and television writer (born 1939)

- Occupations: Radio presenter/producer; television writer
- Known for: Oh Doctor Beeching!

Richard Spendlove MBE is a British radio presenter/producer and television writer.

== Life and work ==
Spendlove worked for British Railways for 35 years, and in 1963 was appointed Relief Station Master at Ely in Cambridgeshire. He retired from the railways in 1989 at the age of 50, to pursue a career in broadcasting.

With David Croft he wrote and created a BBC TV comedy series, Oh, Doctor Beeching!, which ran on BBC One between 1995 and 1997.

From 1989 until 2017, Spendlove worked for BBC Local Radio as the host of his long-running Saturday night music and phone-in show, which was simulcast from BBC Radio Cambridgeshire and also broadcast on the Eastern Counties radio stations, Radio Norfolk, Radio Suffolk, Radio Essex, BBC Three Counties Radio, Radio Northampton and Radio Kent. In January 1994, an Early day motion tabled in the House of Commons after a break in its broadcasting received a total of fifteen signatures. It was believed to be the longest running phone-in chat show on British Radio.

Spendlove was awarded the MBE for "Services to Regional and Local Radio Broadcasting" in 2000.

In 2016, the BBC was critical of his use of his show to gain support for a convicted Royal Marine murderer.
