= Cissie and Ada =

Fictional characters

- Les Dawson (right) and Roy Barraclough (left) as Cissie and Ada on The Les Dawson Show (BBC, 1978)
- Created by: Les Dawson and Roy Barraclough
- Portrayed by: Roy Barraclough and Les Dawson respectively

In-universe information
- Alias: Cissie Braithwaite and Ada Shufflebotham; Cissie Braithewaite and Ada Sidebottom
- Gender: Female
- Nationality: British

Cissie and Ada, in full Cissie Braithwaite and Ada Shufflebotham (or Sidebottom), (Note: Ada's surname is recorded both as Sidebottom and as Shufflebotham in various sources. The Guardian records it as Shufflebotham in "The Guide: Hard as Males" (9 August 2008, p. 8) as does The Daily Mirror in "Football: It's Time for Liverpool and Chelsea to ... Show Some Dignity" (20 April 2008, p. 55). However, The Independent, in "The Ten Best Drag Acts" (27 June 2006, p. 24) uses Sidebottom.) are a comedy drag act featuring two fictional housewives from Northern England (or, more specifically, Lancashire). The act was created and played by the comedian Les Dawson and the comic actor Roy Barraclough on television in the 1970s and 1980s.

== Act ==
Cissie and Ada sketches featured the two women gossiping. Their comedic mannerisms included stoical pursing of lips and constantly heaved bosoms. Cissie and Ada became a hit with the British public.

== History ==
Dawson explained that this mouthing of words (or "mee-mawing") was a habit of Lancashire millworkers trying to communicate by lip reading over the tremendous racket of the looms. Millworkers then resorted to this practice in daily life to discuss delicate subjects.

The pair created the characters in rehearsals, in homage to the music hall star Norman Evans, who appeared in drag in a 1950 film, Over the Garden Wall, playing the lead character, Fanny Lawton. They were persuaded by the producer to use them in sketches in the show Sez Les. Although Dawson needed persuading to don drag, and Barraclough was nervous that he would not be able to match Dawson's talent for ad-libbing, the characters became permanent features of the show.

Barraclough recalled that his characterisation of Cissie "was drawn from an aunt of mine who always thought she was slightly above the rest of the family, Auntie Annie. You know, she would always have a sherry. And the rest of the family always took the piss out of her." Key to Dawson's portrayal of Ada was a handbag "tightly clutched to the waist in a manner suggesting infinite disapproval".

The characters were revisited by the pair in a series of commercials for fresh cream cakes in 1984. They were portrayed in animation (voiced by Dawson and Barraclough) in television advertisements for the Post Office in the early 1990s.

=== Stage show ===
A new play written by Graham Warrener, (incorporating Cissie and Ada original sketches from Dawson's BBC days, written by Terry Ravenscroft), and directed by JJ (John-Jackson) Almond, Cissie And Ada: An Hysterical Rectomy, began a UK tour at the Grand Theatre, Blackpool on 15 July 2013, in Les Dawson's hometown. The show starred Eric Potts as Ada/Les, Steve Nallon as Cissie/Roy, Steven Arnold as the writer and Natasha Magigi as the dresser.

== Critical reception ==
In 2006, Sir Ian McKellen, writing in The Independent, named them the tenth best drag act ever created, commenting that they "were as real as the crones in the Rover's Return".

== See also ==
- Cross-dressing in film and television
- List of drag groups
