= Barbara Marten =

British actress (born 1952)

- Born: Barbara Mason; 31 January 1952 (age 74); Leeds, West Riding of Yorkshire, England
- Other name: Barbara Kenny
- Occupation: Actress
- Years active: 1985–present
- Spouse: Mike Kenny
- Children: 3

Barbara Marten (born 31 January 1952) is a British actress. She is most known for playing Eve Montgomery in Casualty. She has appeared in various soaps, including EastEnders and Brookside, as well as many other drama serials, such as Harry, The Bill and Band of Gold.

== Early life ==
Marten was born in Leeds, West Riding of Yorkshire, and grew up in County Durham. She went to the all-girls William Newton School in Norton, then Stockton and Billingham Technical College. She went to drama school at the London Academy of Music and Dramatic Art as a teenager for three years, and later said that it put her off becoming an actress. Marten trained as a teacher in Birmingham and taught for two years before being drawn back to the stage.

After becoming involved with a theatre group in Coventry, Marten joined a newly formed theatre group in Doncaster. They toured Yorkshire, performing plays about various subjects, including the St Leger, and another about battered wives.

== Career ==
In 1996, Marten appeared at the National Theatre in Helen Edmundson's adaptation of Leo Tolstoy's War and Peace. She has also appeared in various other plays such as Hamlet, Who’s Afraid of Virginia Woolf? (at Manchester Royal Exchange), The Winter's Tale (at the Royal Exchange), Get Up & Tie Your Fingers (Customs House), The Awkward Squad (West End), Heldenplatz (Arcola), The Enemies Within, Some Kind of Hero (at the Young Vic), The Glass Menagerie (Lyceum, Edinburgh), Everything Is Possible: The York Suffragettes (York Theatre Royal) and a touring production of An Inspector Calls.

From 1997 to 1999, she played the part of nurse Eve Montgomery in Casualty. Since then, she has appeared in many TV dramas, receiving much acclaim for her work in dramas such as Bob & Rose and Fat Friends. Marten played the lead role of Ellen in the film Between Two Women (2000), and then in A Passionate Woman (2010) as Moira. She appeared in the 2012 series Public Enemies.

Marten then played Hannah Greg in the period television drama series The Mill (between 2013 and 2014) which was about life at Quarry Bank Mill during the Industrial Revolution.

Marten appeared as Elizabeth I in the fantasy television series A Discovery of Witches, and has played Sylvia Chambers on the drama thriller television series The Devil's Hour since 2022. In 2024, Marten began portraying Sister Avila in the HBO science fiction series Dune: Prophecy.

== Personal life ==
Barbara and her husband, Mike Kenny, (writer of The Railway Children play) have three sons, Theo, Josh and Billy. Marten met Kenny in the 1980s, while acting in a student pantomime in Birmingham, when they were studying to become teachers. They have lived in York since 2004, having previously lived in Leeds. The children have studied at the Steiner School at Fulford.

== Filmography ==
=== Television ===
Year	Title	Role	Notes
1985	The Practice	Barbara Quinn	4 episodes
1985–1989	Brookside	Margaret Jefferson	9 episodes
1988	Christabel	Freda	1 episode
1988	Screen Two	Marlene	1 episode
1988	The Ruth Rendell Mysteries	Katharine Freeman	1 episode
1989	Screen One	Bill's wife	1 episode
1989	The Fifteen Streets	Hannah Kelly	(TV Movie)
1989, 1997–1999	Casualty	Eve Montgomery / Tamara Redpath (1 episode)	39 episodes
1990	Shoot to Kill	Stella Stalker	(TV Movie)
1992	The Life and Times of Henry Pratt	Ada Pratt	(TV Mini-Series), 1 episode
1992	In Suspicious Circumstances	Mrs. Browning	(TV Series), 1 episode
1993	Love and Reason	Mel Lynch	(TV Mini-Series), 3 episodes
1993–1995	Harry	Rita Salter (Harry's ex-wife)	15 episodes
1995–2006	The Bill	Laura Meadows / Joan Barnwood / Barbara Dean	12 episodes (10 episodes as Laura Meadows)
1995	Band of Gold	Mrs. Richards	3 episodes
1995	Medics	Barbara Lawson	1 episode
1996	Goodbye My Love	Jean Humphry	(TV Movie)
1997	The Sherman Plays	Gwen John	(TV Series), 1 episode
2000	Badger	Marie	1 episode
2000	Where the Heart Is	Frances Barrow	1 episode
2000–2002	Fat Friends	Liz Ashburn	3 episodes
2001	Bob & Rose	Carol Cooper	6 episodes
2002	Flesh and Blood	Barbara	(TV Movie)
2002	A Is for Acid	Emily Haigh	(TV Movie)
2003	The Debt	Gwen Dresner	(TV Movie)
2003	In Search of the Brontës	Tabitha Aykroyd	(TV Movie)
2005	Rome	Diviner	1 episode
2005	The Royal	Assistant Matron Thelma Parker	1 episode
2005	EastEnders	D.S. Haydon or DS Haydon	7 episodes
2005	Faith	Doreen	(TV Movie)
2006	Goldplated	Beth White	8 episodes
2006	Silent Witness	Mary Duncan	3 episodes
2007	Dalziel and Pascoe	Louise Roach	2 episode
2008	Heartbeat	Margaret Watson	1 episode
2008	Florence Nightingale	Fanny, Florence's mother	(TV Movie)
2009	Waking the Dead	Penny Cain	2 episodes
2009	Doctors	Liz Frobisher	1 episode
2009	The Street	Nessa	1 episode
2009	Law & Order: UK	Phillipa Keegan	1 episode
2010	A Passionate Woman	Moira	1 episode
2010	Five Days	Ellie Gooding	1 episode
2011	Walk Like a Panther	Margaret Bolton	1 episode
2011	In with the Flynns	Mrs. Cooper	1 episode
2012	Vera	Diane Barton	1 episode
2012	Kidnap and Ransom	Janet Taylor	3 episodes
2012	Whitechapel	Adelina Grace	1 episode
2012	Public Enemies	Kathy Whiteley	3 episodes
2013	Frankie	Jean Winters	1 episode
2013–2014	The Mill	Hannah Greg	10 episodes
2018	Mrs Wilson	Mrs. McKelvie	2 episodes
2019	Riviera	Edith Moreau	2 episodes
2019	Sanctuary	Margot	8 episodes
2021	A Discovery of Witches	Queen Elizabeth I	2 episodes
2021	Angela Black	Sally	1 episode
2022–present	The Devil's Hour	Sylvia Chambers	8 episodes
2023	Dalgliesh	Janet Carpenter	2 episodes
2024	My Lady Jane	Granny	3 episodes
2024	Dune: Prophecy	Sister Avila	6 episodes
2026	Slow Horses	Anne	Episode: "Lost and Found"

=== Film ===
Year	Title	Role	Notes
1987	A Month in the Country	Mrs. Sykes	Irish drama film
1989	Home Run	Bill's wife	
2000	Between Two Women	Ellen Hardy	
2010	Capture Anthologies: Fables & Fairytales	Margaret Travis	(Video)
2010	Oranges and Sunshine	Mary	
2015	Hamlet	Gertrude	
2020	The Turning	Mrs. Grose	
2022	The Twin	Helen	
2026	The Idiot(s)		
2026	Digger	Beatrice Compson	

== Awards ==
In 2018, she was nominated for a Drama Desk Award for Outstanding Featured Actress in a Play for her role in People, Places and Things at National Theatre/St. Ann's Warehouse.
