= Julia Deakin =

English actress (born 1952)

- Born: Julia Margaret Deakin; 20 May 1952 (age 74); Gainsborough, Lincolnshire, England
- Occupation: Actress
- Spouse: Michael Simkins

Julia Margaret Deakin (born 15 May 1952) is an English actress. She is known for her roles in the sitcoms So Haunt Me (1992–1994), Oh, Doctor Beeching! (1996–1997) and Spaced (1999–2001). Her film appearances include Hot Fuzz (2007) and High-Rise (2015).

== Early life ==
Deakin was born in Gainsborough, Lincolnshire, where her parents Wyn and Bill were shopkeepers.

She attended Gainsborough High School for Girls (became part of Queen Elizabeth's High School in 1983), a girls' grammar school. She started French and Drama teacher training near Manchester, then attended Mountview Theatre School.

== Career ==
In theatre, she played Mrs. Sowerberry in Cameron Mackintosh's large-scale West End revival of Oliver! at the London Palladium in 1994, and can be heard singing the song "That's Your Funeral" (with David Delve) on the cast recording.

On television, Deakin played Stella Tulley in Side by Side and Marsha, the ageing divorcée landlady, in the sitcom Spaced (1999).

Deakin earlier appeared in the television sitcom Oh, Doctor Beeching! (1996–1997), where she played the role of May Skinner, replacing Sherrie Hewson from the original pilot. She appeared as Carole Copeland, Dominick's adoptive mother, in 33 episodes of Holby City over 2015-2021. She has also made many single television appearances, including playing Jill, the receptionist from Pear Tree Productions, in one episode of the first series of I'm Alan Partridge, a rural dominatrix in Doc Martin as well as roles in Midsomer Murders and Coronation Street. She appeared in the sketch comedy series Big Train alongside fellow Spaced cast members Simon Pegg and Mark Heap. She plays Dr. Jean in the Alan segments on Modern Toss. She played Luella's mother, Genevieve Shakespeare in "The Envious Court", Shakespeare & Hathaway: Private Investigators S2:E9 (2019).

She has appeared on radio, as Eva Tattle in The Maltby Collection. She also guest starred in the Doctor Who audio drama Terror Firma for Big Finish Productions. And appeared in an episode of Agatha Raisin with Penelope Keith.

She portrayed Daphne Andrews in House of Anubis. Her character left in series two.

== Film ==
Deakin had a cameo in the feature film Shaun of the Dead (2004) and played the pub landlady Mary Porter in the film Hot Fuzz (2007) by Simon Pegg and Edgar Wright. In 2009 she was cast as Maggie, a Brighton mother in Ben Wheatley's British crime film Down Terrace. She later appeared in Ben Wheatley's 2015 cinema adaptation of High-Rise as Jean, the assistant to protagonist Dr. Laing.

== Personal life ==
She is married to actor and author Michael Simkins.

== Filmography ==
=== Television roles ===
Year	Title	Role	Notes
1979	Follow the Star	Angel / Villager	TV film
1983	Birth of a Nation	Deputy Headmistress Grunsell	TV film
1983	The Kenny Everett Television Show	House keeper	Episode: #2.4
1986	God's Chosen Car Park	Nancy Dean	TV film
1986	Unnatural Causes	Pamela	Episode: "Evensong"
1987	Worlds Beyond	Ellie	Episode: "The Eye of Yemanja"
1987	Vanity Fair	Madame de Saint Amour	Episode: "Our Friend the Major"
1988	Clarence	Angela	Episode: #1.1
1988	Casualty	Jill	Episode: "Welcome to Casualty"
1989	Coronation Street	Secretary	
1989	4 Play	Judy	Episode: "Family"
1989–2004	Coronation Street	Brenda Fearns / DP's Secretary	22 episodes
1991–2007	The Bill	Annie Thomas / Mrs. Brigazzi / Manageress	3 episodes
1992	So Haunt Me	Carole Dawlish ("Carole with an E")	
1992	Side by Side	Stella Tulley	
1992	Haggard	Agnes	Episode: "Mad Jack"
1992	Boon	Frank	Episode: "Deadline"
1992–1994	So Haunt Me	Carole Dawlish	8 episodes
1994	Mother's Ruin	Brucella Pashley	5 episodes
1994	Wycliffe	Stephanie Vinter	Episode: "The Last Rites"
1996–1997	Oh, Doctor Beeching!	May Skinner	19 episodes
1997	Spark	Ursula Craig	3 episodes
1997	I'm Alan Partridge	Jill	Episode: "Alan Attraction"
1998	Big Train		Episode: #1.3
1998	The Canterbury Tales	The Prioress (voice)	
1999	Hope and Glory	Jude Jakes	Episode: #1.4
1999–2001	Spaced	Marsha Klein	14 episodes
2001–2021	Holby City	Carole Copeland / Molly Mackie / Lynn Joseph / Annabelle Garston	26 episodes
2000	Heartburn Hotel	Jules	Episode: "Hero"
2000	The Sleeper	Valerie	
2002	Dalziel and Pascoe	Chloe Miles	Episode: "Mens Sana"
2004	If...	Justice Snowdon	
2004	Animated Tales of the World	Wang Bao's Mother (voice)	Episode: "The Magic Gourd"
2005	Doc Martin	Gloria Rix	Episode: "Old Dogs"
2005	Midsomer Murders	Valerie Smeeton	Episode: "Midsomer Rhapsody"
2005	The Brief	Faith Gilespie	Episode: "The Architect's Wife"
2006–2013	Doctors	Janette Treadwell / Laura Maidment / Sandra Millard / Lynne Spice / Margaret Wheeler	5 episodes
2007	The Peter Serafinowicz Show	Various	Episode: #1.2
2008	Hancock & Joan	Landlady	TV film
2008	The Wrong Door		Episode: "The Smutty Aliens"
2008	Clive Hole	Clever Hooker	TV short
2009	Plus One	Juney Pearce	Episode: "I Do a Lot of Work for Charity"
2009	No Heroics	Lynda	Episode: "Origin, Tonic"
2010	Hounded	Queen Gertrude	Episode: "Queen Mu"
2010	Whites	Heather Critch	Episode: #1.4
2010	The First Men in the Moon	Mrs. Fitt	TV film
2011	Coming of Age	Aunty Olwen	Episode: "Penguin"
2011	Comedy Showcase	Mrs. Kay	Episode: "Coma Girl"
2011	Little Crackers	Sister Aquinas	Episode: "Sally Lindsay's Little Cracker: My First Christmas Number One"
2011–2012	House of Anubis	Daphne Andrews	54 episodes
2012	Scott & Bailey	Scary Mary Jackson	Episode: #2.6
2012	Starlings	Lizzie	Episode: #1.5
2012	Bad Sugar	Dilys	TV film
2013	Big Bad World	Shirley	6 episodes
2013	Badults	Carol	Episode: "Girls"
2013	Breathless	Kathleen	Episode: #1.3
2014	The Midnight Beast	Sylvia	3 episodes
2014	Alt	Liz	TV film
2014	The Life of Rock with Brian Pern	WPC Karen Bovis	Episode: "Jukebox Musical"
2015	I Live with Models	Susan Markovitz	Episode: "Trip"
2016	Mid Morning Matters with Alan Partridge	Caller	4 episodes
2016	Boomers	Sally	Episode: "Naming Ceremony"
2016	BBC Comedy Feeds	Helen	Episode: "Fail"
2017	Back	Ellen	Episode: "Pilot"
2017	Loaded	Pauline	Episode: "Watto's Mum"
2017	Comedy Playhouse	Thanet Janet	Episode: "Static"
2018–2019	Shakespeare & Hathaway: Private Investigators	Genevieve Shakespeare	2 episodes
2019	Dad's Army: The Lost Episodes	Lady Chairman	Episode: "The Loneliness of the Long Distance Walker"
2020	The Windsors	Carole Middleton	
2021	Inside Beverly Hills: Land of Rich and Famous	Narrator	Voice role

=== Film roles ===
Year	Title	Role	Notes
1986	Mr. Love	Melanie	
1990	Dancin' Thru the Dark	Bernadette King	
1994	Staggered	Brenda	
2000	Liam	Auntie Aggie	
2002	Pure	Mrs. Rawlings	
2004	Shaun of the Dead	Yvonne's Mum	
2004	Between Two Women	Alice	
2004	The Tale of Tarquin Slant	Mrs. Slant	Short film
2006	Scoop	Sid's Co-Passengers	
2007	Hot Fuzz	Mary Porter	
2009	Down Terrace	Maggie	
2012	The Sweeney	Older Woman	
2013	The World's End	B&B Landlady	
2013	Having You	Mrs. Haughton	
2015	High-Rise	Jean	
2018	Lifeline	The Supervisor	Short film
2018	The Snarling	Yvonne Mayor - Reporter	
2018	Mausoleum	Julia	Short film
2020	Rebecca	Lady Crowan	
2020	Talk Radio	Pauline	Short film
2022	Mind-set	Charity Pat	
