= Fast Friends (game show) =

- Directed by: Sylvie Boden
- Presented by: Les Dawson
- Country of origin: United Kingdom
- Original language: English
- No. of series: 1
- No. of episodes: 14

Production
- Running time: 30 minutes

Original release
- Network: BBC One
- Release: 30 March – 28 June 1991

Fast Friends is a short-lived game show that aired for one series on BBC One in 1991. Hosted by Les Dawson, it was an adaptation of an unsold pilot produced for US television in 1984 by Jay Wolpert.

== Gameplay ==
Two teams of thirty people sat on stage. Les would ask who they had elected as their team captain and the captains would come up on stage.

Each captain had thirty seconds in order to select four people for their team. The seconds would appear on what Dawson termed 'The Bridge' just above the set. The catch was that the captain had to split the thirty seconds into four different time limits and then choose which friend would answer the question. If they were wrong, they had to select someone else. If they were successful, that friend would be on the team. If they were unsuccessful and the time run out, that friend would not be on the team.

In the next round, the 'friends' and captains were all asked individual multi-choice questions. If the friends were right, they would stay on the team; if they are wrong, however, they would be sent, in Dawson's words, "off to the dump dock". However, a lifeline was offered, whereby if the captain was correct, the friend remained. The captain was never sent to the Dump Dock, but if he/she gave a wrong answer, he/she had to select a friend to send there. The first captain to lose all his/her friends lost the game, but everyone received a Fast Friends address book to take home.

In the final round, the winning captain was joined by all his/her friends once again and they were given a selection of answers to a question on the video wall. Only one of the answers was incorrect and this must be avoided in order to ensure victory. Each of the friends would suggest an answer and the captain would decide whether to go with it or choose an alternative answer. If the team could choose all the correct answers, the captain won a holiday; otherwise, everyone won a mini-TV and of course the address book. The captain also won £25 for each correct answer, and the friends who gave correct answers that the captain accepted also won £25.

== American version ==
The original unsold pilot was shot on 28 November 1984 hosted by Bob Goen. Additionally, unlike the British version with thirty people, the American version consisted of thirty-two audience members instead.
