= The Ritz (TV series) =

1987 British TV series

- Created by: John Godber
- Starring: Andrew Dunn; Julia Ford; Kate Layden; Richard James Lewis; Shona Lindsay; Andrew Livingston; Cheryl Prime; Paul Rider; Richard Ridings; Mark Addy
- Opening theme: "Puttin' On the Ritz"
- Country of origin: United Kingdom
- No. of episodes: 6

Production
- Producer: Chris Parr
- Running time: 45–51 mins

Original release
- Network: BBC 2
- Release: 24 April – 29 May 1987

The Ritz is a six-part BBC television series that aired in 1987. It was a comedy/drama set in a nightclub, where three bouncers—Chike played by Paul Rider, Skodge played by Andrew Dunn and Kenny played by Andrew Livingstone—helped to protect the newly formed Ritz night club from a rival club owner, Mad Mick, played by Richard Ridings.

== Production ==
The series was written and co-directed by John Godber; his co-director was Martin Shardlow and was based on John Godber's stage play 'Putting On The Ritz' which premiered at the Leicester Haymarket Theatre in 1986. The same cast from the stage show appeared in the TV series. The series also spawned a one episode spin-off called The Continental.

Andrew Dunn later starred in Victoria Wood's sitcom Dinnerladies as Canteen Manager Tony, his fellow Ritz bouncers both made one-off appearances in the series, Paul Rider as the escaped criminal The Blender in the episode "Fog" and Andrew Livingstone played Norman the agoraphobic breadman in one first series episode "Monday".

== Cast ==
- Richard James Lewis ... Eric
- Andrew Dunn ... Skodge
- Paul Rider ... Chike
- Andrew Livingston ... Kenny
- Martin Ronan ... Gary
- Mark Addy ... Tony
- Richard Ridings ... Mad Mick
- Julia Ford ... Carol

== Episodes ==
No.	Title	Directed by	Written by	Original release date
1	"Monday – Grand Opening Night: Eric's Dream"	John Godber and Martin Shardlow	John Godber	24 April 1987
Eric has sunk all his redundancy money into buying The Ritz disco, unaware that the previous owners lasted a mere five hours due to intimidation from the rival local disco-owner, Mad Mick and his entourage.
2	"Tuesday – Women Free Night: Skodge's Nightmare"	John Godber and Martin Shardlow	John Godber	1 May 1987
Cheryl the box office girl arrives and causes quite a stir. Eric is not sure of Skodge's motives and becomes less so during the evening. He discovers that Elaine is Mad Mick's girlfriend.
3	"Wednesday – Over Twenty-Five's Night: Chike's Nightmare"	John Godber and Martin Shardlow	John Godber	8 May 1987
The Ritz throbs to the hits of yesteryear, with Chike on the door as bouncer, but he has family problems.
4	"Thursday – Page Three Night"	John Godber and Martin Shardlow	John Godber	15 May 1987
Gorgeous Gary is late, and not so gorgeous when he arrives. Carol wonders if she's on the shelf at 24. Tony, unfulfilled by the role of chef, itches to show his hidden talents. Eric, his brain teeming with ideas, has booked a special attraction.
5	"Friday – Fancy Dress Night: Kenny's Nightmare"	John Godber and Martin Shardlow	John Godber	22 May 1987
Tonight is fancy dress night down at the Ritz and Kenny is determined to find a woman. Will this be Kenny's night to find romance?
6	"Saturday – St Valentine's Day Dance"	John Godber and Martin Shardlow	John Godber	29 May 1987
To conclude an action-packed week at the Ritz, a night of hearts and flowers. But the tension mounts. Eric feels certain that Mad Mick's arrival is imminent. But when will he come and what will he do when he arrives?
