= Chloe Newsome =

English actress

- Born: Chloe Newsome; 1 December 1976 (age 48); Sheffield, Yorkshire, England
- Occupation: Actress
- Years active: 1989–present
- Known for: Coronation Street (1991–1996, 1998)

Chloe Newsome (born 1 December 1976) is an English actress who is best known for starring in the long-running ITV soap opera Coronation Street, appearing on and off between 1991 and 1998. She was the second actress to portray the role of Vicky McDonald, after Helen Warburton played the character for four episodes in 1990.

== Career ==
Since spending the majority of her teen years working on Coronation Street, Newsome has concentrated on a wide variety of stage work over the last decade. Other screen appearances include The Bill, Sharpe's Waterloo, The Life and Crimes of William Palmer, Children's Ward and the 2005 film adaptation of John Braine's novel The Jealous God.

Because of the irregular nature of acting work, Newsome has taken temporary office employment between jobs.

== Filmography ==
=== Film ===
Year	Title	Role	Notes
2005	The Jealous God	Clare	
2011	Lost Christmas	Alice	

=== Television ===
Year	Title	Role	Notes
1990	Children's Ward	Thea Bartlett	9 episodes
1991–1996, 1998	Coronation Street	Vicky McDonald	Series regular, 256 episodes
1997	Sharpe's Waterloo	Paulette (Whore)	Episode: "Sharpe's Waterloo"
1998	The Life and Crimes of William Palmer	Eliza Tharm	2 episodes
1998	The Bill	Jacky Marsh	Episode: One Small Step – (S14 E51)
1999	Coronation Street: After Hours	Vicky McDonald	Main role, 6 episodes

=== Radio ===
Year	Title	Role	Notes
2020	Agatha Christie’s The Lie	Nell Reeves	BBC Radio 4

=== Theatre ===
- Alphabetical Order as Lesley, Hampstead Theatre, 16 April – 16 May 2009 (Michael Frayn)
- The Hollow as Midge, UK Tour (Bill Kenwright Ltd national tours); 2006 (Agatha Christie)
- And Then There Were None (Agatha Christie)
- Dangerous Corner (J. B. Priestley)
- The Importance of Being Earnest for Ian Dickens Productions (Oscar Wilde)
- Emma (for John Adams at Basingstoke)
- Pride and Prejudice
- The Sneeze (Anton Chekhov)
- Othello (the Good Company) (William Shakespeare)
- The Taming of the Shrew, Kirkstall Abbey, Leeds; 2005 (William Shakespeare)
- A Midsummer Night's Dream, Kirkstall Abbey, Leeds; 2005 (William Shakespeare)
- Twelfth Night, Stafford Castle and Kirkstall Abbey (William Shakespeare)
- The Young Idea (Noël Coward)
- Shooting Star, Chester Gateway (director: Frith Banbury)
- Treehouses, The Union, Southwark
- Wait Until Dark
- Spring and Port Wine West Yorkshire Playhouse, Leeds
