= Parent-in-law =

Parent of one's spouse

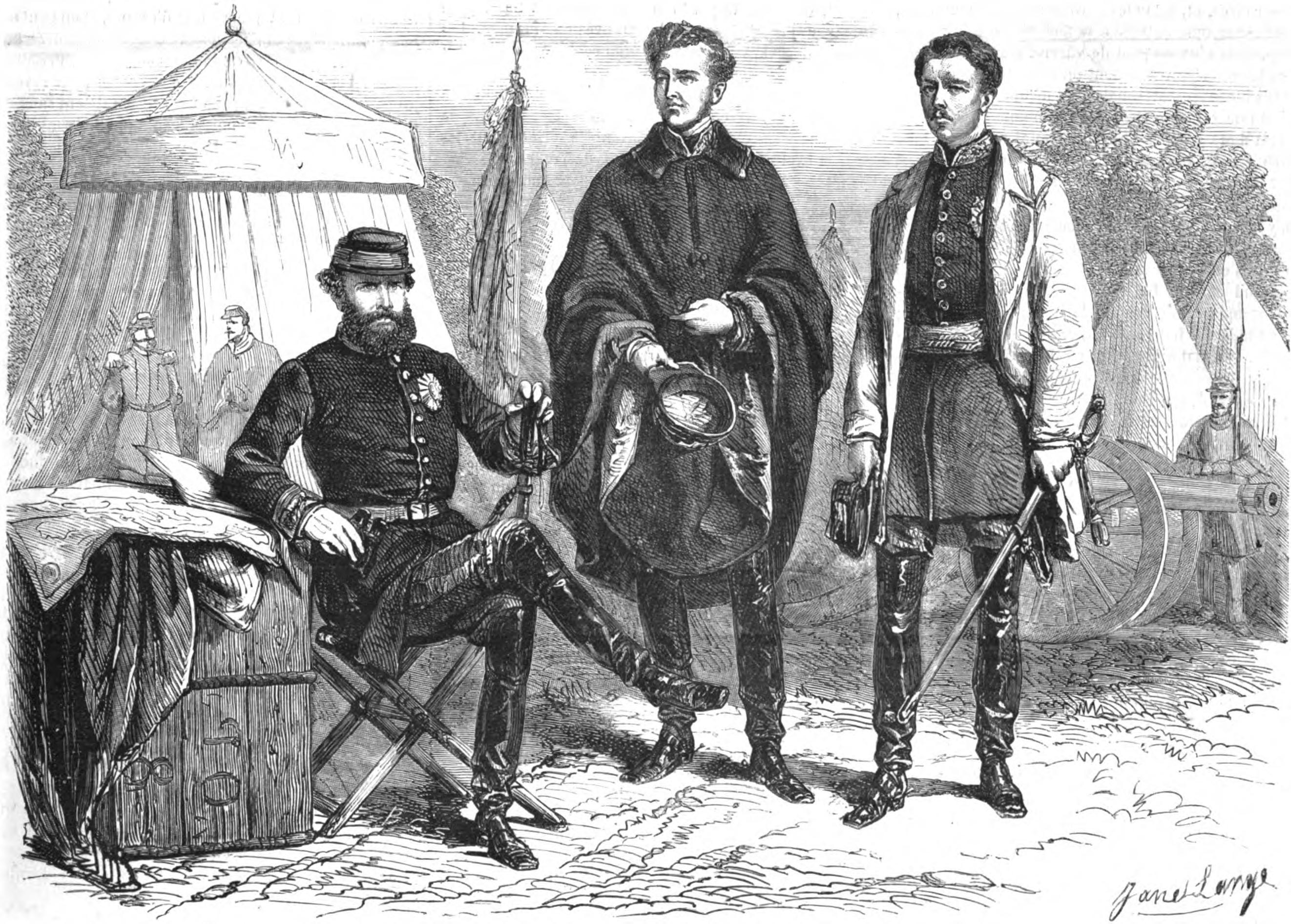
Emperor Pedro II of Brazil (seated) with his two sons-in-law, Princes Ludwig August of Saxe-Coburg and Gotha and Gaston of Orléans, during the Paraguayan War, 1865

A parent-in-law is a person who has a legal affinity with another by being the parent of the other's spouse. Many cultures and legal systems impose duties and responsibilities on persons connected by this relationship. A person is a child-in-law to the parents of the spouse, who are in turn also the parents of those sibling-in-laws (if any) who are siblings of the spouse (as opposed to spouses of siblings). Together, the members of this family affinity group are called the in-laws.

== Fathers-in-law ==
A father-in-law is the father of a person's spouse. Two men who are fathers-in-law to each other's children may be called co-fathers-in-law, or, if there are grandchildren, co-grandfathers.

== Mothers-in-law ==
A mother-in-law is the mother of a person's spouse. Two women who are mothers-in-law to each other's children may be called co-mothers-in-law, or, if there are grandchildren, co-grandmothers.

In comedy and in popular culture, the mother-in-law is stereotyped as bossy, unfriendly, hostile, nosy, overbearing and generally unpleasant. They are often depicted as the bane of the husband, who is married to the mother-in-law's daughter. A mother-in-law joke is a joke that lampoons the obnoxious mother-in-law character.

Some Australian Aboriginal languages use avoidance speech, so-called "mother-in-law languages", special sub-languages used when in hearing distance of taboo relatives, most commonly the mother-in-law.

A type of dwelling, usually guest accommodations within a family home, that may be used for members of the extended family, is sometimes referred to as a mother-in-law suite.

== Parent-in-law relationships ==
Parent-in-laws are often viewed as either a source of conflict or a source of support in a marriage relationship. Jealousy, competition, differences, and disillusioned expectations can cause conflict to arise in these relationships. The perception of parent-in-laws as negative influences on your marriage leads to the characterization of female in-laws as particularly difficult. The stereotyped mother-in-law joke finds humor in the reality of conflict with in-laws. Positive influences have also been noted as in-laws can be a found family for partners/child-in-laws who are not as close to their own family.

While it is sometimes thought that conflict with in-laws will have a disastrous effect on the future of a marriage, the degree of connection to parents-in-law has not been found to influence the success of a marriage. Lack of success of a marriage may be due not to conflict with parents-in-law, but on whether the couple are on the same page about conflicts. There may be discordant perceptions between spouses about their relationships with their in-laws; disagreements on those connections may harm marriage outcomes.

== See also ==
- Affinity (law)
- Marriage
- Mother-in-law apartment
- Mother-in-law house
- Mother-in-law joke
