= The Jealous God (film) =

The Jealous God is a 2005 feature film set in the 1960s by British writer-director Steven Woodcock. It is based on the 1964 novel by John Braine, its opening scenes filmed in a Bradford grammar school where he once studied.

== Main cast ==
- Jason Merrells as Vincent
- Chloe Newsome as Clare
- Mairead Carty as Laura
- Denise Welch as Maureen
- Pamela Cundell as Mrs. Roselea
- Andrew Dunn as Matthew
- Marcia Warren as Mrs. Dungarvan
- William Ilkley as Paul
- Robert Duncan as Robert
- Tony Barton as Jack Herning
- Judy Flynn as Ruth
- Roy Walker as Monsignor
- Rob Parry as Frank Rooney
- Rebecca Manley as Delia
- Steven Woodcock as the confessional priest

== Production and reception ==
While Woodcock's movie Between Two Women was cinematic and intellectual in tone The Jealous God, set in the early 1960s, is more commercially retro-styled, like an actual 1960s melodrama. The poster that promoted the film outside British movie houses was painted by New York City magazine artist Basil Gogos to look like a 1960s movie poster. Film critic Rich Cline was one of the few reviewers who perceived:

"The story is filmed in a straightforward style with as few frills as possible. Woodcock immaculately recreates 1960s-style filmmaking, right down to a prudish tone that avoids actually mentioning any shocking issues by name and pans to the wallpaper when things get remotely steamy. The camera work is like a TV show - lots of moody close-ups and almost no stylistic flourishes besides a gritty recreation of the period. It's extremely effective - like travelling back in time, but with the added resonance of modern actors who combine knowing sensitivity with the overwrought drama."

Critic Michael Brooke, who had also read the source novel, saw it differently:

"Woodcock takes a selfconsciously ‘heritage cinema’ approach, best illustrated by a railway station featuring immaculately restored trains courtesy of the Keighley and Worth Valley Railway. Although the period detail is convincing, this fetishising of surface elements arguably does Braine a disservice. His novel was a sincere attempt at capturing the (then) here and now, but Woodcock's reconstruction too often feels preserved in aspic."

== Marketing ==
Because of its nostalgic tone Between Two Women found favour among an older mainstream audience. Woodcock consulted with cinema managers marketed The Jealous God as middlebrow art for people over 45 and women who read romantic novels. Its release was accompanied by a media campaign that targeted older Sunday night TV viewers. The Basil Gogos poster resembles the cover of a mass market 1960s romantic paperback.
