= Sez Les =

British TV comedy series (1969–1976)

- Starring: Les Dawson; Roy Barraclough; John Cleese
- Country of origin: United Kingdom
- Original language: English
- No. of series: 11
- No. of episodes: 68

Production
- Producer: Yorkshire Television

Original release
- Network: ITV
- Release: 30 April 1969 – 30 November 1976

Sez Les is a British sketch comedy show that starred Les Dawson. It was produced by Yorkshire Television, and aired on ITV from 1969 to 1976. Les Dawson and Roy Barraclough (who was a cast member from series four onward) regularly performed together as the characters Cissie and Ada. John Cleese appeared in a few sketches in series 3 and appeared regularly in series 8 and 9. Other cast members included Norman Chappell, Brian Glover, Brian Murphy, and Kathy Staff. Music for series 1-5 and 7-8 was provided by Syd Lawrence and his orchestra.

== Cast ==
Cast member	Series										
Cast member	1	2	3	4	5	6	7	8	9	10	11
Les Dawson	Yes	Yes	Yes	Yes	Yes	Yes	Yes	Yes	Yes	Yes	Yes
Brian Murphy	Yes	Yes	No	No	No	No	No	No	No	No	No
Roy Barraclough	No	No	No	Yes	Yes	Yes	Yes	Yes	Yes	Yes	Yes
Brian Glover	No	No	No	No	Yes	Yes	No	No	No	No	No
John Cleese	No	No	Yes	No	No	No	No	Yes	Yes	No	No
Norman Chappell	No	No	No	No	No	No	No	No	No	No	Yes
Kathy Staff	No	No	No	No	No	No	No	No	No	No	Yes

== Broadcast history ==
According to Barfe and IMDb, the broadcast episodes were as follows:

- Series 1: 6×30 min, 30 April – 18 June 1969
- Series 2: 6×30 min, 10 September – 19 November 1969
- Series 3: 4×30 min, 16 August – 6 September 1971
- Series 4: 6×30 min, 13 January – 17 February 1972
- Series 5: 7×45 min, 29 July – 9 September 1972
- Series 6: 6×30 min, 30 October – 4 December 1972
- Series 7: 7×30 min, 28 July – 8 September 1973
- Series 8: 7×30 min, 25 January – 8 March 1974
- Series 9: 7×30 min, 28 June – 9 August 1974
- Series 10: 4×60 min, 2 January, 25 February – 10 March 1976
- Series 11: 7×30 min, 19 October – 30 November 1976

All of series 1 and episodes 1–5 of series 2 were made in black and white. All others were made in colour. Timings are given including advertising breaks: the actual running times are several minutes shorter.

Most episodes followed a 'variety' format, including musical and dance numbers with various musical guests. An exception is Series 6, which although treated by IMDb and video label Network as part of the series, bears a different title, Les Sez and consists only of comic sketches and standup. Series 11 also lacks musical and dance items.

Most episodes were directed by David Mallet, later a prominent director of music videos. The exceptions were Series 6, directed by Bill Hitchcock, and Series 10–11, directed by Vernon Lawrence.

A Christmas special aired in 1973, and a New Year special in 1976.

All episodes of series one and two are missing, and are believed to have been wiped. The remaining episodes survive in the archive and have been released on DVD by Network.

== Video releases ==
- Sez Les, Volume 1 (October 2008), series three and four
- Sez Les, Volume 2 (25 May 2009), series five and six
- Sez Les, Volume 3 (8 February 2010), series seven and eight, plus the 1973 Christmas special
- Sez Les, Volume 4 (7 May 2012), series nine, ten, and eleven, plus the 1976 New Year special
