= The Last of the Baskets =

British ITV sitcom (1971–1972)

- Genre: Sitcom
- Created by: John Stevenson
- Written by: John Stevenson (12 episodes); Andy Mayer (1 episode)
- Directed by: Bill Podmore
- Starring: Arthur Lowe
- Country of origin: United Kingdom
- Original language: English
- No. of series: 2
- No. of episodes: 13

Production
- Producer: Bill Podmore
- Running time: 25 minutes
- Production company: Granada Television

Original release
- Network: ITV
- Release: 10 May 1971 – 14 February 1972

The Last of the Baskets is a British television sitcom produced by Granada Television and starring Arthur Lowe that ran for two series in the early 1970s. It was written by John Stevenson, with one episode (Series 2, Episode 5, "The Hound of the Baskets") written by Andy Mayer.

Created by John Stevenson, the programme was about a factory worker Clifford Basket (played by Ken Jones) who inherited a title of the Earl of Clogborough, the remaining estate of which is a rundown mansion at Little Clogborough-in-the-Marsh and a faithful servant Bodkin played by Arthur Lowe.

== Cast ==
- Redvers Bodkin – Arthur Lowe
- Clifford Basket – Ken Jones
- Mrs Alfreda Basket – Patricia Hayes

== Series overview ==
Series	Episodes	Originally released	
Series	Episodes	First released	Last released
1	6	10 May 1971	21 June 1971
2	7	3 January 1972	14 February 1972

== Episodes ==
=== Series 1 (1971) ===
No. overall	No. in series	Title	Directed by	Written by	Original release date
1	1	"End of the Peer"	Bill Podmore	John Stevenson	10 May 1971
2	2	"Well Done, Good and Faithful Servant"	Bill Podmore	John Stevenson	17 May 1971
3	3	"I Gotta Horse"	Bill Podmore	John Stevenson	24 May 1971
4	4	"For I'm to Be Queen of the May"	Bill Podmore	John Stevenson	7 June 1971
5	5	"For Richer, for Poorer"	Bill Podmore	John Stevenson	14 June 1971
6	6	"Do Unto Others..."	Bill Podmore	John Stevenson	21 June 1971

=== Series 2 (1972) ===
No. overall	No. in series	Title	Directed by	Written by	Original release date
7	1	"It's a Living"	Bill Podmore	John Stevenson	3 January 1972
8	2	"Since Then I Have Used No Other"	Bill Podmore	John Stevenson	10 January 1972
9	3	"Good Queen Bess Slept Here"	Bill Podmore	John Stevenson	17 January 1972
10	4	"A Chip Off the Old Block"	Bill Podmore	John Stevenson	24 January 1972
11	5	"The Hound of the Baskets"	Bill Podmore	Andy Mayer	31 January 1972
12	6	"Nice Work If You Can Get It"	Bill Podmore	John Stevenson	7 February 1972
13	7	"A Tisket, a Tasket"	Bill Podmore	John Stevenson	14 February 1972
