= The Jealous God =

1964 novel by John Braine

- First edition cover
- Author: John Braine
- Publisher: Eyre & Spottiswoode
- Publication date: 1964

The Jealous God is a 1964 novel by John Braine. The story, set in an Irish Catholic community of Yorkshire circa in the 1960s, follows a 30-year-old man and his attempts at liberating himself from his domineering mother. The title refers to his mother's wish that her "favorite" son, despite being in his thirties already, pursue the career path of a clergyman. The book was adapted into a film in 2005.

== Summary ==
Vincent Dungarvan is a history teacher at a Catholic school for boys. While his two brothers Matthew and Paul have been married with children for many years, Vincent is still single and living at home with his widowed mother, who is also a teacher. At 30, he is still a virgin. He has gone out with one or two Catholic girls but rejected them when he found them too superficial and boring.

One day, in the local library, he encounters Laura, a new librarian. Fascinated by her good looks and driven by (as he sees it) sinful desire, he is for once able to overcome his shyness and asks her out. Laura accepts, and they immediately fall in love with each other and start dating on a regular basis. However, he prefers not to tell his possessive mother about her, let alone invite her home.

In the course of the following weeks, Vincent's life is shattered by a number of revelations concerning Laura. He is disappointed when she tells him that she is a Protestant and that she has stopped going to church altogether. Furthermore, through a deliberate indiscretion by Laura's flatmate Ruth, he learns that Laura is divorced. For him as a Catholic, this means that he is seeing a married woman, which significantly increases his guilt and helplessness about the situation. Accordingly, they break up.

Soon afterwards, Vincent loses his virginity to Maureen, his sister-in-law, while his brother Matthew has gone out and the children are asleep. On the following morning, back at his mother's, he recollects what happened the previous evening:

[…] He had deliberately denied himself the one pleasure that had the power to transform his very notion of pleasure; he had committed all the other sins because of indolence or indifference, never stopping to calculate the price. He smiled; it was the same for the sin you enjoyed as the sin that you didn't.

To spend the day talking to schoolboys about James I was, he reflected over his scrambled eggs, an anticlimax […]. He smiled to himself: if he had been a savage he'd have been entitled to wear some special insignia […].

"I'm glad you're so cheerful," his mother said.

"It was something in the Guardian," he said.

That very day, Vincent has an appointment with a senior clergyman about his vocation and once and for all makes up his mind not to become a priest. He also decides to see Laura again. In the meantime she has settled down in a flat of her own, and this is where they have sex for the first time, without Vincent confessing to Laura that he has recently had sex with his own sister-in-law. When, some weeks later, Maureen announces that she is pregnant again, he is afraid that he might be the father of her baby. Out of jealousy, Maureen writes Laura's ex-husband Robert an anonymous letter, urging him to make up with his wife again. Vincent and Laura split up again as Laura is not certain about her husband's intentions.

In the end two instances of deus ex machina resolve the complicated situation. First, Maureen has a miscarriage, freeing Vincent. Then Robert commits suicide, paving the way for a Catholic wedding between Vincent and Laura, who are planning to leave the past behind and start a new life somewhere else.

== Film ==
The novel was adapted as a feature film by writer-director Steven Woodcock and released in 2005. Jason Merrells played Vincent, Denise Welch played Maureen, and Mairead Carty played Laura. Other actors featured were Marcia Warren (Mrs. Dungarvan), Andrew Dunn (Matthew) and Roy Walker (the Monsignor).

== See also ==
- The British Museum Is Falling Down
- How Far Can You Go?
- A Severed Head

== See also ==
- The Jealous God
- 1964 in literature
