= Between Two Women (2000 film) =

- Directed by: Steven Woodcock
- Written by: Steven Woodcock
- Starring: Barbara Marten; Andrina Carroll; Andrew Dunn
- Cinematography: Gordon Hickie
- Release date: 2004
- Running time: 92 minutes

Between Two Women is a 2004 historical film by British writer-director Steven Woodcock. It tells the story of Ellen, a factory worker's wife trapped in an unhappy marriage amidst the grime and industrial noise of northern England.

== Plot ==
Working class Ellen (Barbara Marten) makes friends with her young son's middle-class schoolteacher, Kathy, also known as Miss Thompson (Andrina Carroll). As the two bond over Ellen's son Victor's outstanding talent for drawing, a relationship blossoms between the two women. Ellen's husband constantly criticises Ellen and Victor, and their relationship is shown to be hostile and abusive. Ellen's husband, a mill worker, cannot see the value of the art Victor creates and is distrustful of his wife. He is also hurt and embarrassed when a piece of Victor's work sells for almost as much as he earns from his monthly wage. Ultimately, with no warning, Kathy moves away – but writes to Ellen. They meet and admit their feelings for one another.

Ellen's marriage with her husband completely breaks down, and the latter moves out of the family home. Calmer than he had been, he states that she is still his wife and he will still come home to visit. The film ends with Ellen and Victor taking a train to meet Kathy, implying hope for the future.

== Cast ==
- Barbara Marten as Ellen Hardy
- Andrina Carroll as Kathy
- Andrew Dunn as Geoff Hardy
- Bruce Alexander as Mr. Butterworth, Headmaster
- Genevieve Atlas as School Secretary (billed as Genny Atlas)
- Tony Barton as Tom
- Robert Beal as Postman
- Duggie Brown as Mr. Britchenor
- Benjamin Campbell as Britchenor
- Glenn Cunningham as Journalist
- Julia Deakin as Alice
- Anne Dobell as Woman in Guest House
- Dinah Handley as Landlady
- William Ilkley as Frank
- Pauline Jefferson as Mrs. Parkin, Teacher
- Eileen O'Brien as Mrs. Walker
- Margaret Pardoe as Cleaning Woman
- Alan Partington as Mr. Pugh, Teacher
- Eric Potts as Mr. Hathershaw
- Michael Rookledge as Man on Beach
- Paul Shane as Mayor
- Michael Wardle as Man in Guest House
- Lori Wells as Mrs. Britchenor
- Frank Windsor as Mr. Walker
- Edward Woodcock as Victor

== Style ==
The stifling social conventions of the 1950s are at the root of the movie's poetic and very understated style. In the DVD documentary The Making of Between Two Women (only on UK DVD) Steven Woodcock says that Miss Thompson was originally intended to be a man but he couldn't get the story to work. He claims not to have based the story of the two women on anything that happened to him in real life but that it came as a flash of inspiration when he woke up one morning.

The movie is in the tradition of the British northern-set kitchen sink drama and is a homage to the British New Wave of the late 1950s and early 1960s, being filmed in the same naturalistic way, drawing on Cinéma vérité and using entirely real locations. The main difference is that the theme of a lesbian relationship across the class divide in a gritty working class setting would have been unlikely to be acceptable in the 50s.

== Background and production ==
The movie was shot mostly in and around Huddersfield and Rochdale during the summer and autumn of 1999. The film won Best Feature Film Award at the Hollywood-backed New York Lesbian & Gay Film Festival soon after release. It has been screened in Hollywood at the Directors Guild of America. It has been shown on British TV more than 250 times.

Despite a British setting and cast, the film was released on DVD by Image Entertainment in America before the UK, to some good reviews in Variety and the Los Angeles Times.

== US vs UK versions ==
The Region 2 UK version (79 mins) is shorter than the Region 1 US version (93 mins) and is the preferred version of the director. The UK version also contains the behind-the-scenes documentaries, giving nearly an hour of extras with the trailer.

The second documentary on the UK DVD is about deleted scenes and in it Woodcock explains why he remastered the movie in 2005 and cut it back by about 15 minutes for the 2006 British release. He advises he thought these scenes of interaction between the two women worked in the novel but slowed the story down on screen. The documentary also shows complete scenes and parts of scenes that were filmed but not included in either the US or UK versions of the movie.

Ellen's son Victor was played by Edward Woodcock, the director's son in real life.
