= Mark Addy =

English actor (born 1964)

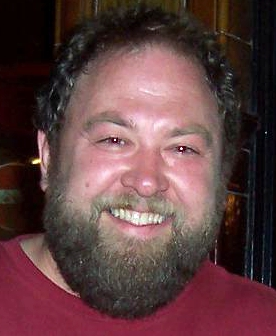
- Addy in 2006
- Born: Mark Ian Addy; 14 January 1964 (age 62); York, England
- Education: Royal Academy of Dramatic Art (GrDip)
- Occupation: Actor
- Years active: 1987–present
- Spouse: Kelly Biggs (m. 1996)
- Children: 3

Mark Ian Addy (born 14 January 1964) is an English actor best known for his roles as DC Gary Boyle in the sitcom The Thin Blue Line (1995–1996), Bill Miller in the American TV comedy Still Standing (2002–2006), Andy Richmond in Trollied (2011–2013), King Robert Baratheon in the first season of Game of Thrones (2011), and as Dave Horsefall in the film The Full Monty (1997) and its sequel TV series (2023).

For his debut film role in The Full Monty, Addy earned a BAFTA Award nomination for Best Actor in a Supporting Role. His other notable film roles include Fred Flintstone in The Flintstones in Viva Rock Vegas (2000), Roland in A Knight's Tale (2001), Friar Tuck in Robin Hood (2010), Mr. Bakewell in Downton Abbey (2019), and Richard Buckley in The Lost King (2022).

== Early life ==
Addy was born in York, where his family has lived since at least 1910 when his paternal great-grandfather was recorded there. His father, Ian, spent his working life as a glazier at York Minster. Addy was educated at Joseph Rowntree School in York. He furthered his acting education by attending the Royal Academy of Dramatic Art in London, graduating with an Acting Diploma in 1984. Whilst still at school, Addy had three weeks of work experience at the York Theatre Royal, and loved it so much that continued working there, eventually deciding acting was to be his career goal.

== Career ==
Addy made his first television appearance in 1987 in The Ritz, followed in 1988 by A Very Peculiar Practice, followed by television performances in shows such as Heartbeat, Band of Gold, Married... with Children, Peak Practice, Too Much Sun, Sunnyside Farm, Trollied and The Syndicate.

He portrayed Bill Miller (using an improvised American accent) in the CBS sitcom Still Standing from 2002-2006 (88 episodes) and portrayed Detective Boyle in the second series of the British sitcom The Thin Blue Line. He also appeared on ITV1's comedy drama series Bonkers, and another ITV comedy drama, Bike Squad, in early 2008 as Sergeant John Rook.

In 2009, Addy starred with Fay Ripley in a series of adverts for the relaunched Tesco Clubcard.

In 2011, he portrayed King Robert Baratheon in the HBO series Game of Thrones. Addy's audition for the role was, according to showrunners David Benioff and D. B. Weiss, the best they saw. Although Robert was a main character in the series beginning, the king's enthusiasm for "drinking, whoring, and fighting" eventually took its toll, and Addy's character was killed off in season 1 after a hunting incident with a wild boar.

He portrayed Hercules, one of the main characters in the BBC One fantasy drama series Atlantis, which started airing on 28 September 2013 in the UK. In the BBC television drama New Blood (2016), featuring young detectives from the Serious Fraud Office and the London Police Service, Addy played D.S. Derek Sands.

In film, Addy had a leading role in The Full Monty (1997), and portrayed Fred Flintstone in the 2000 film The Flintstones in Viva Rock Vegas. He portrayed Mac McArthur in the 1998 film Jack Frost. In 2001, he portrayed Roland in A Knight's Tale and a butler to Chris Rock's character in the film Down to Earth. In Down to Earth, his character was an American who was pretending to be British.

Addy portrayed David Philby in The Time Machine and made an appearance as the Ship Captain in Around the World in 80 Days with Jackie Chan and Steve Coogan, and made an appearance as Friar Tuck in Ridley Scott's 2010 film Robin Hood.

In 2018, he portrayed Paltraki in the Doctor Who episode "The Battle of Ranskoor Av Kolos".

In 2019, he appeared in the Downton Abbey movie as Mr. Bakewell, who owns the shop from which Mrs. Patmore buys her supplies; a character who was mentioned in the television series but hadn't yet appeared onscreen.

In 2020, he portrayed DS Stan Jones in the detective drama series White House Farm.

In 2023, Addy starred as David Coake, causing issues on the Kinloch Bravo oil rig in The Rig, in a cast that included Iain Glen, Emily Hampshire, and Martin Compston.

=== Stage ===
Addy portrayed Kevin Snell in the 2006 revival of Donkeys' Years at the Comedy Theatre in London. In 2007–08 he has appeared at the National Theatre as Dogberry in Much Ado About Nothing alongside Zoe Wanamaker, and as Hjalmar Johansen in the Tony Harrison play Fram, also at the Royal National Theatre.

In 2011, he portrayed Vladimir, an NKVD officer, in Collaborators at the National Theatre, which also featured in the National Theatre Live programme, where live performances are broadcast to cinemas around the world. In 2016, Addy appeared in Richard Bean's The Nap at Sheffield Crucible with Jack O'Connell and Ralf Little, directed by Richard Wilson.

== Honours ==
On 20 July 2019, Addy was awarded an honorary doctorate from the University of York, having given a speech at the Roses Varsity opening ceremony a few months prior.

== Acting credits ==
=== Film ===
| Year | Title | Role | Notes |
|---|---|---|---|
| 1990 | Dark Romances Vol. 2 | Sam | |
| 1996 | Bruised Fruit | Angel | Short film |
| 1997 | The Full Monty | David "Dave" Horsfall | Screen Actors Guild Award for Outstanding Performance by a Cast in a Motion Picture; Nominated—BAFTA Award for Best Actor in a Supporting Role; Nominated—Satellite Award for Best Supporting Actor in a Motion Picture – Comedy or Musical |
| 1998 | Closer | | Short film |
| 1998 | Jack Frost | Mac MacArthur | |
| 1999 | The Last Yellow | Frank | |
| 2000 | The Announcement | Andy | |
| 2000 | The Flintstones in Viva Rock Vegas | Fred Flintstone | |
| 2000 | Married 2 Malcolm | Malcolm | |
| 2001 | Down to Earth | Cisco | |
| 2001 | A Knight's Tale | Roland | |
| 2002 | The Time Machine | David Philby | |
| 2002 | Heartlands | Ron | |
| 2003 | The Order | Thomas Garrett | |
| 2004 | Around the World in 80 Days | Steamer Captain | |
| 2009 | Red Riding: In the Year of Our Lord 1983 | John Piggott | |
| 2010 | It's a Wonderful Afterlife | DI Smythe | |
| 2010 | Robin Hood | Friar Tuck | |
| 2010 | Barney's Version | Detective O'Hearne | |
| 2018 | The More You Ignore Me | Keith | |
| 2018 | Mary Poppins Returns | Clyde the Horse | Voice |
| 2018 | Elsewhere | Terry | Short film |
| 2018 | The Runaways | Reith | |
| 2019 | Downton Abbey | Mr. Bakewell | |
| 2020 | Swan | Ian | Short film |
| 2022 | The Lost King | Richard Buckley | |
| 2025 | The Choral | Mr. Fyton | |
| 2026 | Mother's Pride | Paxman | |

Key
| † | Denotes films that have not yet been released |

=== Television ===
| Year | Title | Role | Notes |
|---|---|---|---|
| 1987 | The Continental | | |
| 1987 | The Ritz | | Episode: "Monday" |
| 1988 | A Very Peculiar Practice | Mal Prentis | 2 episodes |
| 1990 | The Bill | Matthew Holden | 2 episodes |
| 1992 | Married... with Children | Lower Uncton Local | 2 episodes |
| 1994 | Between the Lines | PC | Episode: "Unknown Soldier" |
| 1995 | Band of Gold | DC Sherrington | 3 episodes |
| 1995 | Peak Practice | Alec Kitson | Episode: "A Normal Life" |
| 1995 | Ghostbusters of East Finchley | DC Newley | 2 episodes |
| 1995–1996 | Heartbeat | Norman Greengrass | 2 episodes |
| 1996 | Out of the Blue | Robbo | Episode: "2.6" |
| 1996 | The Thin Blue Line | D.C. Boyle | 7 episodes |
| 1996 | Respect | Joe Carr | Television film |
| 1997 | The Heart Surgeon | Phil Mycroft | Television film |
| 1997 | Sunnyside Farm | Ken Sunnyside | TV series |
| 1999 | The Flint Street Nativity | Ass | Television film |
| 2000 | Too Much Sun | Nigel Conway | 6 episodes |
| 2002–2006 | Still Standing | Bill Miller | 88 episodes |
| 2007 | Bonkers | Tony Barker | 6 episodes |
| 2008 | Bike Squad | Sgt. John Rook | Television film |
| 2010 | National Theatre Live | Squire Max Harkaway | Episode: "London Assurance" |
| 2011 | Game of Thrones | Robert Baratheon | Main cast; 7 episodes (series 1); Nominated—Scream Award for Best Ensemble; Nominated—SAG Award Outstanding Performance by an Ensemble in a Drama Series |
| 2011 | Great Expectations | Pumblechook | |
| 2011–2013 | Trollied | Andy Richmond | Main cast: Series 1–3 (27 episodes) |
| 2013 | The Syndicate | Alan | |
| 2013–2015 | Atlantis | Hercules | 25 episodes |
| 2014 | Remember Me | Rob Fairholme | 3 episodes |
| 2016 | Jericho | Earl Bamford | |
| 2016 | New Blood | DS Derek Sands | |
| 2016 | Borderline | Himself | |
| 2016 | Young Hyacinth | Daddy | |
| 2018 | Doctor Who | Paltraki | Episode: "The Battle of Ranskoor Av Kolos" |
| 2019 | Vera | Tony Briggs | Episode: "Cuckoo" |
| 2020 | White House Farm | DS Stan Jones | 6 Episodes |
| 2020 | Moving On | Josh | Episode: "Man of Steel" |
| 2020 | The Salisbury Poisonings | Ross Cassidy | TV series |
| 2021 | Hansel and Gretel: After Ever After | Englebert | Television film |
| 2022 | Sherwood | Ron St. Clair | |
| 2023 | The Full Monty | David "Dave" Horsfall | Miniseries |
| 2023–2025 | The Rig | Coake | |
| 2024 | Dune: Prophecy | Evgeny Harkonnen | 2 Episodes |
| 2026 | Ellis | Elliott Quinn | 2 Episodes |
| 2026 | Good Omens | Harry the Fish | Series 3 |

=== Theatre ===
| Year | Title | Role | Venue |
|---|---|---|---|
| 2011 | Collaborators | Valdimir | National Theatre |
| 2016 | The Nap | Bobby Spokes | Crucible Theatre |
| 2019 | Hangmen | Harry Wade | Atlantic Theatre Company |
| 2020 | Hangmen | Harry Wade | Golden Theatre |
| 2025 | The Unlikely Pilgrimage of Harold Fry | Harold Fry | Chichester Festival Theatre |
| 2026 | The Unlikely Pilgrimage of Harold Fry | Harold Fry | Theatre Royal Haymarket |

=== Video games ===
| Year | Title | Role | Notes |
|---|---|---|---|
| 2018 | World of Warcraft: Battle for Azeroth | Daelin Proudmoore | |
| 2020 | Chivalry 2 | Narrator | Trailer only |

=== Audio books ===
| Year | Title | Role | Notes |
|---|---|---|---|
| 2025 | Harry Potter and the Philosopher's Stone (Full-Cast Audio Edition) | Rubeus Hagrid | |
| 2025 | Harry Potter and the Chamber of Secrets (Full-Cast Audio Edition) | Rubeus Hagrid | |
| 2026 | Harry Potter and the Prisoner of Azkaban (Full-Cast Audio Edition) | Rubeus Hagrid | |
| 2026 | Harry Potter and the Goblet of Fire (Full-Cast Audio Edition) | Rubeus Hagrid | |
| 2026 | Harry Potter and the Order of the Phoenix (Full-Cast Audio Edition) | Rubeus Hagrid | |
| 2026 | Harry Potter and the Half Blood Prince (Full-Cast Audio Edition) | Rubeus Hagrid | |
| 2026 | Harry Potter and the Deathly Hallows (Full-Cast Audio Edition) | Rubeus Hagrid | |

== Awards and nominations ==
| Year | Group | Award | Work | Result | Ref |
|---|---|---|---|---|---|
| 1998 | 51st British Academy Film Awards | Best Actor in a Supporting Role | The Full Monty | Nominated | |
| 1998 | Chlotrudis Awards | Best Supporting Actor | The Full Monty | Nominated | |
| 1998 | MTV Movie & TV Awards | Best Dance Sequence | The Full Monty | Nominated | |
| 1998 | Online Film & Television Association | Best Breakthrough Performance - Male | The Full Monty | Nominated | |
| 1998 | 2nd Golden Satellite Awards | Best Supporting Actor – Musical or Comedy | The Full Monty | Nominated | |
| 1998 | Screen Actors Guild Awards | Outstanding Performance by a Cast in a Motion Picture (shared) | The Full Monty | Won | |
| 2004 | Young Artist Awards | Most Popular Mom & Pop in a Television Series (shared with Jami Gertz) | Still Standing | Nominated | |
| 2012 | Screen Actors Guild Awards | Outstanding Performance by an Ensemble in a Drama Series (shared) | Game of Thrones | Nominated | |
| 2020 | CinEuphoria Awards | Merit - Honorary Award (shared) | Game of Thrones | Won | |
