= John Stevenson (scriptwriter) =

British screenwriter (1937–2023)

- Born: 10 May 1937; Manchester, England
- Died: 5 September 2023 (aged 86)
- Occupations: Screenwriter; journalist
- Years active: 1958–2006
- Television: Coronation Street
- Spouses: Barbara Sutcliffe (m. 1957, divorced); Sheila McGregor (m. 1977, divorced); Myra Davies (m. 1985)
- Children: 5

John Stevenson (10 May 1937 – 5 September 2023) was a British screenwriter who, between 1976 and 2006, was a regular writer on Britain's longest-running soap opera, Coronation Street.

== Early life ==
Stevenson was born in Manchester in 1937. He attended the London School of Economics and was originally a newspaper journalist. He wrote for the Oldham Evening Chronicle from 1958 to 1964, and then worked as an entertainment journalist and theatre critic for the Daily Mail, based in Manchester.

== Television writing ==
Stevenson moved into screenwriting after producer Peter Eckersley showed him a sitcom pilot entitled Her Majesty's Pleasure, and asked him to come up with story ideas. Stevenson worked on the show during its run from 1968 to 1969, writing with Leslie Duxbury. He continued to write comedy through the 1970s, with his credits including The Last of the Baskets, How's Your Father? and Yanks Go Home He co-wrote the popular comedy-drama Brass with Julian Roach in the 1980s and in 1994, the sitcom, Mother's Ruin, starring Roy Barraclough. However, this was not a ratings success and only ran for one series.

In 1976, Stevenson began writing for Coronation Street, where he worked on 447 episodes over the next thirty years.

== Personal life and death ==
Stevenson married Barbara Sutcliffe in 1957; they had two children and later divorced. In 1977, he married Sheila McGregor, though their marriage also ended in divorce. He married Myra Davies in 1985; they had three children and remained together until Stevenson's death, from complications of Alzheimer's disease, on 5 September 2023, at the age of 86.

== Awards ==
Stevenson won the Special Achievement Award at the 2005 British Soap Awards.
