= Steven Woodcock (film director) =

- Born: July 13, 1961 (age 64); Huddersfield, West Riding of Yorkshire, England
- Education: Manchester University (Industrial Design)
- Alma mater: Batley School of Art and Design
- Occupations: Film director, writer, producer
- Notable work: Between Two Women, The Jealous God
- Spouse: Julie Woodcock

Steven Woodcock (born 13 July 1961) is a British film director, writer, and producer. He has made two movies set in north England, Between Two Women and The Jealous God. They are similarly set in the 1950s and 1960s and resemble each other in production while differing in tone and narrative style.

Woodcock has written at least one book under his own name, the novel Between Two Women, on which he based a film screenplay. In the DVD documentary, The Making of Between Two Women, he gives a tour of the main set for his third feature film, Flight into Camden, to explain his filming methods on this adaptation of the award-winning novel by David Storey.

== Early life ==
Steven Woodcock grew up in Huddersfield, West Riding of Yorkshire, England. He lived in Berry Brow and Milnsbridge, the latter an industrialized suburb to the west of Huddersfield centre where British Prime Minister Harold Wilson grew up. Many scenes in his films were shot in and around where he once lived. Milnsbridge's imposing railway viaduct and part of Market Street are seen at the start of Between Two Women as are mills and factory chimneys (since the filming the mills have been converted into apartment blocks). Other locations in Huddersfield have included Fartown, Longwood, Beaumont Park, Holmfirth, Linthwaite, Marsden and a mill at Newsome. Scenes were also shot in nearby Bradford, Halifax and Keighley.

Woodcock attended Berry Brow Junior School as a boy, then Newsome High School and Sports College between 1972 and 1977 and Greenhead College from 1977 to 1979. He then went to Batley School of Art and Design and Manchester University where he studied industrial design. His father had died when he was a boy, so his mother brought him up alone until she died when he was 20.

== Later career ==
Throughout his childhood Woodcock wanted to work in movie and TV special effects. To try to get into the industry he made special effects films on 16mm in his spare time while at university. He said he was ridiculed by his school teachers when he was a teenager for intending to work for Thunderbirds producer Gerry Anderson. He did so at age 21, designing and building special effects models for the TV show Terrahawks. He was not given a screen credit, so secretly signed his large initials and date of birth with Letraset on the sides of his spaceship models. He also worked on blockbuster movies such as Aliens at Pinewood Studios, and the TV show The Wind in the Willows. For over ten years he ran a model and special effects company, mainly serving advertising agencies.

== Other work ==
Woodcock wrote for the Yorkshire Post newspaper as an editorial columnist on the opinion pages. Some of his newspaper and magazine articles are illustrated with his own dramatic black and white art photographs, possibly explaining why his movies are well shot. His writing ranges from straight socio political commentary through issues about morality (the major theme in his films) and the arts. He wrote an off-the-wall piece about why such a prolific weed as the dandelion is his favourite flower.

Woodcock was interviewed in a 12-page article in 2007 by the Gerry Anderson fan magazine, FAB. In it he said he'd made the movies he made because they were easier to finance than big budget action or sci-fi films, which he'd always wanted to make. At the time of the interview he was developing an action TV show with a British TV channel and he said it was more like the American CSI cop shows than his films.

In February 2006, Woodcock and his co-producer wife Julie were featured in a prime-time documentary at 7.30pm on ITV1 called My Northwest, in which they are interviewed about their films while clips from the Odeon premiere of The Jealous God were shown.
