= Roy Barraclough =

British actor (1935–2017)

Roy Barraclough MBE
- Born: 12 July 1935; Preston, Lancashire, England
- Died: 1 June 2017 (aged 81); Ashton-under-Lyne, Greater Manchester, England
- Resting place: Hollinwood Cemetery, Oldham, Greater Manchester, England
- Occupation: Television actor
- Years active: 1964-2017
- Known for: Role of Alec Gilroy in Coronation Street

Roy Senior Barraclough (12 July 1935 – 1 June 2017) was an English comic actor. He was best known for his role as Alec Gilroy, the devious, mournful landlord of the Rovers Return in the long-running British TV soap Coronation Street, and for the double-act Cissie and Ada with comedian Les Dawson.

== Career ==
Roy Barraclough began his career as a draughtsman, taking time off to work as an entertainer in a holiday camp on the Isle of Wight. Combining his day job with local amateur theatre for several years, he was eventually offered a full-time acting contract by repertory theatre producer Nita Valerie with her company in Huddersfield. Barraclough regularly appeared on stage and at times played piano in the pit, including for comedienne Hylda Baker.

Barraclough later joined the repertory company at Stoke (appearing alongside Ben Kingsley) and then Oldham in 1966, appearing alongside Barbara Knox and Anne Kirkbride, who later both became colleagues on Coronation Street. Whilst at Oldham he made his first TV appearances for Granada Television, including Coronation Street in 1964.

In 1969, he was cast as Harry Everitt in Yorkshire Television's first soap opera Castle Haven with Kathy Staff as his on-screen wife. Although the soap only lasted a year, Barraclough became a regular guest actor on Yorkshire TV shows.

Throughout the 1970s, he formed a partnership with comedian Les Dawson. They played two gossipy old ladies '...of a certain age...': Dawson playing Ada Shufflebotham, and Barraclough playing Cissie Braithwaite, the more 'refined' of the two. Barraclough also had a significant role playing Mr. Cobbledick in the children's TV show Pardon My Genie. He also made guest appearances in the sitcoms The Lovers, Rising Damp and George and Mildred.

Barraclough made occasional appearances in Coronation Street in 1972 and 1975, playing the sleazy Alec Gilroy, theatrical agent to night club singer Rita Littlewood. He returned permanently in 1986 and a marriage to Bet Lynch was included in his character's narrative. After several departures and comebacks, Barraclough finally left Coronation Street for good at the end of 1998.

In 1986 he guest starred as 'Hickory Dickory-Dock' the town crier, in the second series of children's TV show T-Bag (T-Bag Strikes Again).

He was the subject of This Is Your Life in 1987 when he was surprised by Eamonn Andrews.

In 1994, Barraclough appeared in the sitcom, Mother's Ruin, in which he played a bachelor dominated by his belligerent mother (Dora Bryan). He made a guest appearance in Last of the Summer Wine (2005), playing opposite both Bryan and his friend Kathy Staff, and appeared in a variety of TV shows including Casualty (1999), Peak Practice (1994 and 2001) and Funland (2005). Later the same year, he appeared in Heartbeat as Ellis.

In 2009, he played the vicar in the BBC drama All the Small Things and from 2012 to 2013 he played Maurice in Last Tango in Halifax. In 2016, he played Mr Grainger in a one-off revival episode of Are You Being Served?.

On stage, Barraclough appeared in musicals (The Boy Friend and Gypsy), straight drama (Death of a Salesman) and Christmas shows and pantomimes. He created the role of Santa in the lavish stage musical Santa Claus, which he reprised for several Christmases.

In the 2006 New Year Honours, Barraclough was appointed a Member of the Order of the British Empire (MBE) for services to drama and to charity in the region of North West England.

== Personal life ==
Barraclough was homosexual, and was in a long-term relationship with Mark Llewellin.

== Death ==
Barraclough died aged 81, at the Willow Wood Hospice in Ashton-under-Lyne, Greater Manchester, on 1 June 2017, following a short illness.

== Selected Filmography ==
Year	Title	Role	Notes
1965	It's Dark Outside	Barman	Episode: "Specimens Walk on Their Hind Legs Too"
1967	City '68	Estate Agent	Episode: "The Waiting Game"
1968	Gazette	Photographer	Episode: "It's All Happening"
1968	Tom Grattan's War	Coastguard	Episode: "The Wreckers"
1969	Castle Haven	Harry Everitt	107 episodes
1970	Nearest and Dearest	Vicar	Episode: "An Open-and-Shut Case"
1970	The Lovers	Waiter	Episode: "A Pipe and a Moustache"
1970	Queenie's Castle	Herbert Cooney	Episode: "Just Good Friends"
1970	Z-Cars	George Todd	Episode: "It Could Happen to a Nicer Girl: Part 1"
1971	Hadleigh	Schooner	Episode: "Breakdown"
1971	Never Mind the Quality, Feel the Width	Barman	Episode: "There's No Smoke, Without Fire"
1971	Play for Today	Claud	Episode: "The Piano"
1972	Man at the Top	Reporter	Episode: "The Foreman's Job at Last"
1972	Public Eye	M.C.	Episode: "Horse and Carriage"
1972	The Last of the Baskets	The Rev. Henry Smock	Episode: "Its a Living"
1972 - 1973	Pardon My Genie	Mr. Cobbledick	26 episodes
1972 - 1976	Sez Les	Various	9 episodes
1972 - 1975, 1986 - 1998	Coronation Street	Alec Gilroy	850 episodes
1973	Billy Liar	Bernard Dobson	Episode: "Billy and the Monster"
1975	Dawson's Weekly	Roy	5 episodes
1976	The Slipper and the Rose	Tailor	Film
1977	George and Mildred	Henry	Episode: "No Business Like Snow Business"
1977	The XYY Man	Charlie	Episode: "The Missing Civil Servant"
1978	Rising Damp	Barman	Episode: "Pink Carnations"
1979 - 1980	The Dawson Watch	Cissie	19 episodes
1980	Spooner's Patch	Landlord	Episode: "Spooner's Box"
1981 - 1987	The Les Dawson Show	Various	20 episodes
1982	The Bounder	Assistant	Episode: "Suspicion"
1984	Bergerac	Hodge	Episode: "The Company You Keep"
1984	Foxy Lady	Man from Chappels Music Publishers	Episode #2.2
1986	Car Trouble	Man with Dog	Film
1986	Lost Empires	Albert Brentwood	2 episodes
1986	The Return of the Antelope	Professor	Episode: "The Lost Park"
1986	T-Bag Strikes Again	Hickery	2 episodes
1994	Cadfael	Walter Aurifaber	Episode: "The Sanctuary Sparrow"
1994	Mother's Ruin	Leslie Flintcroft	6 episodes
1994	Peak Practice	Joe Wilson	Episode: "Power Games"
1994	Woof!	The Great Demento	Episode: "The Great Demento and Rex"
1999	Bostock's Cup	Arthur Swarbrick	TV movie
1999	Casualty	Arthur Lyle	Episode: "Face Value"
1999	Dr Willoughby	The Funnel	Episode: "Awards"
2000	The Mrs Bradley Mysteries	Dr. Simms	Episode: "Death at the Opera"
2001	Barbara	Vernon	Episode: "Mate"
2001	Peak Practice	Mayor Joss Brown	Episode: "Private Eyes, Public Eye"
2004	A Thing Called Love	Harold Waterman	6 episodes
2004	Revolver	Various	5 episodes
2004	The Basil Brush Show	Kindly Man	Episode: "It's a Wonderful Brush"
2005	Funland	Onan Van Kneck	10 episodes
2005	Heartbeat	Ellis	Episode: "Off the Rails"
2005	Holby City	Leslie Sharpe	Episode: "The Honeymoon is Over"
2005	Last of the Summer Wine	Crowcroft	Episode: "Has Anyone Seen a Peruvian Wart?"
2008	Doctors	Stan Jameson	Episode: "Cat Fight"
2009	All the Small Things	Rev. Barticle	5 episodes
2012 - 2013	Last Tango in Halifax	Maurice	4 episodes
2013	A Ghost Story for Christmas	Hodgson	Episode: "The Tractate Middoth"
2015	Pompidou	Albert	Episode: "Hunger"
2016	Are You Being Served?	Mr. Grainger	TV movie
