= Les Dawson =

English comedian (1931–1993)

- Born: Leslie Dawson; 2 February 1931; Collyhurst, Manchester, England
- Died: 10 June 1993 (aged 62); Whalley Range, Manchester, England
- Resting place: Lytham Park Cemetery and Crematorium, Lytham St Annes, Lancashire, England
- Occupations: Comedian; actor; writer; presenter; pianist
- Years active: 1956–1993
- Spouse(s): Margaret Rose Plant (m. 1960; died 1986) Tracy Roper (m. 1989)
- Children: 4

Leslie Dawson (2 February 1931 – 10 June 1993) was an English comedian, actor, writer, presenter, and pianist. He was known for his deadpan style, curmudgeonly persona, musical routines, and jokes about his mother-in-law and wife.

== Early life ==
Les Dawson was born in Collyhurst, Manchester, on 2 February 1931, the only child of bricklayer Leslie Dawson (2 August 1905 – 10 April 1970) and Julia Nolan (14 January 1908 – 29 September 1957), who was of Irish descent. His first job was in the parcels department of the Manchester Co-op. He worked briefly as a journalist on the Bury Times. and then as an apprentice electrician, before being called up for National Service, first at Catterick Garrison, Yorkshire in 1949, furthered in Germany with the 2nd Dragoon Guards (Queen's Bays).

== Early career ==
Dawson moved to Paris to find inspiration as a writer, to earn money to live, he found work as a pianist in a brothel. Making a living as a pianist evolved into comedy, when he got laughs from deliberately bad piano-playing by playing "all the wrong notes in exactly the right order" At the age of 36, he became disillusioned with show business and was considering an alternative career, until he appeared on Hughie Green's talent show Opportunity Knocks in 1967.

== Comedy career ==
Television series in which he appeared included the panel game Jokers Wild (1969–73) hosted by Barry Cryer, Sez Les (1969–76) and Dawson's Weekly (1975), all for Yorkshire Television. After joining the BBC, his TV projects were The Dawson Watch (1979–80), written by Andy Hamilton and Terry Ravenscroft, The Les Dawson Show (1978–89), written by Terry Ravenscroft, and the quiz show Blankety Blank, which he presented from 1984 until its cancellation in 1990. Dawson starred in Listen to Les on BBC Radio 2 in the 1970s and 1980s, He also hosted the short-lived gameshow Fast Friends which aired on BBC One in 1991.

Dawson made many appearances on BBC Television's variety show, The Good Old Days, in the 1970s and 1980s. Dawson co-hosted Prince Edward's charity television special The Grand Knockout Tournament in 1987. When Richard Wilson turned down the part of Victor Meldrew in the BBC sitcom One Foot In The Grave, writer David Renwick considered Dawson for the role, but Wilson changed his mind before it was offered.

In 1991, Dawson starred in the BBC television production of Nona, an adaptation of the 1977 play La Nona ("Grandma") by Roberto Cossa for the Performance series. Performing in drag, he was cast as a 100-year old, compulsive eater in a Buenos Aires household.

Dawson was the subject of This Is Your Life on two occasions, in December 1971 when Eamonn Andrews surprised him on Opportunity Knocks, and again 21 years later, in what would be one of his last television appearances, when he was surprised by Michael Aspel on stage at the Theatre Royal, Plymouth, at the curtain call of the pantomime Dick Whittington in December 1992. His final TV appearance was on the LWT series Surprise, Surprise hosted by Cilla Black, in which he sang a comic rendition of "I Got You Babe" with a woman from the audience who wanted to sing with him. The episode was aired shortly after his death.

Dawson was a heavy smoker and drinker. When not working he would often drink a bottle of whisky and smoke 50 cigarettes a day. Dawson was initiated into the famous show business fraternity, the Grand Order of Water Rats and served as that order's "King Rat" in 1985.

Dawson also wrote novels. He told his second wife, Tracy, "Always remind them – I was a writer too."

=== Routines and image ===
Dawson's style as a comic was world-weary, lugubrious and earthy. Some of his routines featured Roy Barraclough and himself as elderly Lancashire women, Cissie Braithwaite and Ada Shufflebotham. Barraclough's character Cissie had pretensions of refinement and corrected Ada's malapropisms or vulgar expressions. As authentic characters of their day, they spoke some words aloud but mouthed others, particularly those pertaining to bodily functions and sex. The characters were based on those Les Dawson knew in real life. He explained that this mouthing of words (or "mee-mawing") was a habit of Lancashire millworkers communicating over the loud noise of looms, then resorted to in daily life for indelicate subjects. To further portray the reality of northern, working-class women, Cissie and Ada would sit with folded arms, occasionally adjusting their bosoms by a hoist of the forearms. Many Cissie and Ada sketches were written by Terry Ravenscroft. This was also typical of pantomime dame style, an act copied from his hero, Norman Evans and his act Over the Garden Wall.

Dawson was portly and often dressed in John Bull costume. In his later BBC television shows he introduced a troupe of fat dancing ladies called the Roly Polys.

He was a talented pianist but developed a gag in which he played a familiar piece such as Beethoven's Moonlight Sonata and then introduced hideously wrong notes (while keeping the tune recognisable) without appearing to realise, smiling unctuously and relishing the accuracy and soul of his own performance.

Having broken his jaw in a boxing match, he could pull grotesque faces by pulling his jaw over his upper lip. This is described in the first volume of Dawson's autobiography A Clown Too Many.

== Personal life and death ==
Dawson was married to his first wife, Margaret, from 25 June 1960 until her death on 15 April 1986 from cancer. They had three children: Julie, Pamela and Stuart. Dawson nearly died in February 1985 from a failing prostate gland, complicated by blood poisoning. On 3 September 1988, he suffered a heart attack in Blackpool and spent nine days in hospital. He married his second wife, Tracy Roper, on 6 May 1989; she was 17 years younger. They had a daughter, Charlotte, who was born on 3 October 1992. He died suddenly, aged 62, on 10 June 1993 from a heart attack, during treatment for a heart complaint at St Joseph's Hospital in Longsight, Manchester.

== Legacy ==
On 23 October 2008, 15 years after his death, a bronze statue by Graham Ibbeson was unveiled by his widow Tracy and daughter Charlotte in the ornamental gardens next to the pier in St Anne's-on-Sea, Lancashire, where Dawson lived for many years.

In the Comedians' Comedian, a three-hour programme on UK's Channel 4 on 1 January 2005, Dawson was 37th in the top 50 comedians of all time, voted by fellow comedians and business insiders.

The BBC broadcast, on BBC Two, The Many Faces of Les Dawson, a retrospective, on Christmas Eve 2011.

On 1 June 2013 ITV broadcast Les Dawson: An Audience with That Never Was. The programme featured a Pepper's ghost projection of Dawson, presenting content for a 1993 edition of An Audience with... to be hosted by Dawson but unused due to his death two weeks before recording. The show served as a tribute and featured celebrities including Bruce Forsyth, Cilla Black, Terry Wogan and Ken Dodd. Also among the audience were Dawson's widow Tracy and daughter Charlotte.

On 10 February 2014, the BBC reported that Dawson's daughter Charlotte had found a 110-page "unpublished story of love and mystery, titled An Echo of Shadows, [that] was written under the name Maria Brett-Cooper...".

In 2020, Les Dawson's early years in Paris were portrayed in Sky Arts' series Urban Myths in the episode Les Dawson's Parisienne Adventure, with Mark Addy as the older Les and John Bradley as young Les.

In 2022, Jon Culshaw portrayed Dawson as part of The Edinburgh Assembly's Fringe programme.

== Books ==
Fiction

- Card for the Clubs (1974)
- The Spy Who Came... (1976)
- Cosmo Smallpiece Guide to Male Liberation (1979)
- The Amy Pluckett Letters (1982) / Hitler Was My Mother-in-Law (1984)*
- A Time Before Genesis (1986)
- Come Back with the Wind (1990)
- Well Fared, My Lovely (1991)
- The Blade and the Passion (1993)

Non-fiction

- Les Dawson's Lancashire (1983)
- A Clown Too Many (autobiography, 1985)
  - Title changed for paperback release.
- No Tears for the Clown (autobiography, 1992)
- Malady Lingers on and Other Great Groaners (1982)
- Les Dawson Gives Up (1989)
- The Les Dawson Joke Book (1979)
- Les Dawson's Secret Notebooks (2007)

== Television ==
- Comedy Playhouse: State of the Union (1968)
- Opportunity Knocks (1967) and (1990)
- Fast Friends (1991)
- Blankety Blank (1984–90; 124 episodes)
- Sez Les (1969–76)
- Jokers Wild (1969–73)
- The Loner (1975)
- The Dawson Watch (1979–80)
- The Les Dawson Show (1978–89)
- The Grand Knockout Tournament
- Nona in Performance (British TV series) (1991)

Preceded by Terry Wogan	Host of Blankety Blank; 1984–1990	Succeeded by Paul O'Grady as Lily Savage
