= List of Royal Variety Performances =

This is a list of Royal Variety Performances, gala evenings held annually in the United Kingdom, which are attended by senior members of the British royal family. Initially, the reigning monarch would attend the show but in more recent years, the senior members attending have alternated, with Queen Elizabeth II attending less and less frequently as her reign progressed. King Charles III attended his first Royal Variety Performance as monarch in 2024.

== Performances ==
Where no town or city is noted in the venue column in the following table, it means that the venue is situated in London.

=== 1910s ===
Consumer broadcasting had yet to be invented.

No.	Date	Venue	Acts	Royal(s) present	Ref
(Note: Named the Royal Command Performance.)	1 July 1912	Palace Theatre	Pipifax and Penlo, Barclay Gammon, The Palace Girls, George H. Chirgwin, The Bogannys, Fanny Fields, Paul Cinquevalli, Harry Tate, Ida Crispi and Fred Farrn, Vesta Tilley, La Pia, Little Tich, Arthur Prince, Alfred Lester, Clarice Mayne, Charles Aldrich, George Robey, David Devant, Wilkie Bard, Harry Lauder, Cecilia Loftus	King George V, Queen Mary and Edward, Prince of Wales	
1 (Note: Renamed the Royal Variety Performance. The orchestra was conducted by Edward Elgar.)	28 July 1919	London Coliseum	The Flying Banvards, Ernest Hastings, George Robey and Violet Loraine, Sam Barton, Arthur Prince, Harry Tate, Clarice Mayne, Grock, Du Calion, Ethel Hook	King George V and Queen Mary	

=== 1920s ===
All of the gala evenings until 1926 were un-broadcast and had no main presenter.

No.	Date	Venue	Acts	Royal(s) present	Ref
2 (Note: The first time that the Royal Variety Performance became an annual event.)	25 November 1921	The Hippodrome	Frederick Sylvester & Co, Norah Blaney and Gwen Farrar, G. S. Melvin, Renee and Godfrey, Malcolm McEachern, Rebla, The Peep Show with Annie Croft, Reginald Sharland, Fred Allandale, Albert Darnley and Mary Gibbs, J. Milton Hayes, Billy Merson, The Five Petleys	King George V and Queen Mary	
3	12 December 1922	The Hippodrome	The Flemings, Will Fyffe, Kharum, Du Calion, Lorna and Toots Pound, P. T. Selbit, Muriel George and Earnest Butcher, Tom Webster, Arthur Prince, Harry Weldon, Trix Sisters, The Mirthful Jovers	King George V, Queen Mary and Queen Maud of Norway	
4	13 December 1923	London Coliseum	Bobbie Hind and his all-British Sonara Band, Rupert Hazell, Katrina and Joan, the Griffith Brothers, The Samurai with Lola Karsavina, Sessue Hayakawa, Lewis Gilbert, Ann Trevor and Dora de Winton, Royal Albert Hall Orchestra, Brighter London with Billy Merson, Reg Sharland, Eddie Jaye, Bernard Dudley, Laddie Cliff and Rena Hall, Russian Blue Bird Players, Alfred Lester, Loie Fuller Band, Marimba Band, The Disorderly Room with Tom Walls, Ralph Lynn, Tommy Handley, Jamieson Dodd, Cecil Bainbridge and Fred Kemp, Louis Parker, Barclay Gammon	King George V and Queen Mary	
5	12 February 1925	Alhambra Theatre	George Hurd, Mr & Mrs Tree, Will Hay, Ethel Hook, J. Milton Hayes, J.W. Jackson's Twelve English Dancers, G. H. Elliott, Will Fyffe, Nervo and Knox, Talbot O'Farrell, Harry Tate and Company	King George V and Queen Mary	
6 (Note: The first Royal Variety Performance to broadcast. The BBC provided live radio coverage.)	27 May 1926	Alhambra Theatre	The Twelve Famous Tiller Girls, Dick Henderson, Robb Wilton, Lillian Burgess, Jack Hylton and his famous band, Conn Kenna, Carr & Parr, Bransby Williams, The Houston Sisters, Billy Bennett, Rick Hayes	King George V and Queen Mary	
7	27 May 1927	Victoria Palace Theatre	P.L. Clark, Mona Grey, Norman Long, The Victoria Girls, Jack Edge, Debroy Somers and his band, Albert Whelan, Lily Morris, Georgie Wood, Dolly Harmer, Tom Blacklock, Mr. Flotsam and Mr. Jetsam, The Three Huxster Brothers	King George V and Queen Mary	
8	13 December 1928	London Coliseum	Larry Kemble, Stanelli & Douglas, The Victoria Girls, A.C. Astor, Lillian Burgess, Noni & Horace, Victor Andre, Clarkson Rose, Anton Dolin, Gracie Fields, Will Hay, Jack Hylton and his band	King George V and Queen Mary	

=== 1930s ===
No.	Date	Radio broadcast	Venue	Acts	Royal(s) present	Ref
9	22 May 1930	22 May 1930; BBC National Programme	London Palladium	Sixteen Palladium Girls, Harry Prescott and his seven Hindustans, Tom Payne and Vera Hilliard, George Clarke, Julian Rose, De Groot with David Bor, Reginald Kilbey & Gillie Potter, Max Wall, Chilton & Thomas, Howell Harger, Naldi, Nervo and Knox, Coram, Odali Careno, Totò, Will Hay with Will Hay Jnr and H. Gordon Saunders, Gaston Palmer, Jack Payne and his BBC band	King George V and Queen Mary	
10	11 May 1931	11 May 1931; BBC National Programme	London Palladium	P.L. Clark, Mona Grey, Norman Long, The Victoria Girls, Jack Edge, Debroy Somers and his band, Albert Whelan, Lily Morris, Georgie Wood, Dolly Harmer, Tom Blacklock, Mr. Flotsam and Mr. Jetsam, The Three Huxster Brothers	King George V and Queen Mary	
11	30 May 1932	30 May 1932; BBC National Programme	London Palladium	Stetson, Christoper and Columbus, The Bells, Levanda and the Nine Diamonds, Billy Danvers, George Clarke with Madge Aubrey, Flanagan and Allen, Eugene's Magyar band, Jack Buchanan, Will Fyffe, Errol Addison, Iris Kirkwhite, Nervo and Knox, Naughton and Gold, J. Sherman Fisher's Palladium Girls, Lawrence Tiller Girls, G. S. Melvin, Jasper Maskelyne, Cicely Courtneidge, Jack Hylton and his band, Little Doreen, Harry Champion, Vesta Victoria, Fred Russell, Marie Kendall	King George V and Queen Mary	
12	22 May 1933	—N/a	London Palladium	The London Palladium Crazy Gang (Nervo and Knox, Flanagan and Allen, Naughton and Gold, Eddie Gray, Billy Caryll, Hilda Mundy, Lawrence Barclay), J. Sherman Fisher's Palladium Girls, Omar, Billy Russell, Geraldo and his Tango Orchestra, Gaston and Andree, the Ganjou Brothers and Juanita Richards with Billy Hendrix, Aline Fournier and Vittorio Togo, Cardini, The Company, The Carlo Medini Six, Wilson, Keppel and Betty, William and Joe Mendel, Billy Bennett, Evelyn Laye, Jack Hobbs, Roy Fox and his band	King George V and Queen Mary	
13	8 May 1934	8 May 1934; BBC National Programme	London Palladium	Kafka, Stanley and Mae Quartette, The Three Bonos, Frank Boston, J. Sherman Fisher's Palladium Girls, The Three Sailors, Arthur Lucan and Kitty McShane, Elsie and Doris Waters, Cedric Hardwicke, Osmund Wilson, Cicely Oates, George Robey, Henry Hall and the BBC Dance Orchestra, Jack Holland and June Hart, Murray and Mooney, George Clarke, Bert Platt, Alec Dane, Norah Dwyer, Billy Bennett, Jack Hylton and his band	King George V and Queen Mary	
14 (Note: Held in the presence of King George V and Queen Mary in their Silver Jubilee year. It was the last show that King George V attended as he died in January 1936.)	29 October 1935	—N/a	London Palladium	Hannah Wyatt, Jeanne Devereaux, Nervo and Knox, Naughton and Gold, Flanagan and Allen, Ernie Gerrard, The Six Lias from round about Regent Street, The Diamond Brothers, Joe Jackson, Stanley Holloway, Anton Dolin, Jessie Matthews, J. Sherman Fisher's Palladium Girls, The Western Brothers, Harrison & Fisher, Myles Williams, The Harmony Revellers, Bea Hutten, Syd Railton, Del Foss, Boy Foy, Sandy Powell with Jimmy Fletcher and Joy Jeffries, Three Cossacks, Elsie Carlisle and Sam Browne, Will Mahoney, Arthur Reece, Kate Carney, Gus Elen, Florrie Forde, Harry Champion, Harry Roy and his band	King George V and Queen Mary	
15	29 October 1937	15 November 1937; BBC National Programme	London Palladium	From London Rhapsody, Len Lewis, George Lane, Raymond Newell, Henry Carlisle, Serge Ganjou, Henry Carlisle, Mary Young, Rosarito, George Ganjou, The Gypsy Boys Band, Norman Evans, Florence Desmond, Señor Wences, George Formby, Cicely Courtneidge with the Harry Dennis Dance Sexette and the Sherman Fisher Girls, Max Miller, Jack La Vier, Ethel Revnell and Gracie West, Ralph Reader's Gang Show, The London Palladium Gang Show, Gracie Fields, Will Fyffe	King George VI and Queen Elizabeth	
16 (Note: The last show until after World War II. The finale involving about 150 performers was the biggest ever for a Royal Variety Performance.)	9 November 1938	—N/a	London Coliseum	The Crastonians, The Two Leslies, Murray and Mooney, Evelyn Laye, Renée Houston and Donald Stewart, Ken Davidson and Hugh Forgie, From Running Riot – Richard Hearne and Rosalind Atkinson, The Stuart Morgan Dancers with Lita D'Oray, Harold Hart, William Kat, Jack Payne's Orchestra, Peggy Cochrane, Mary Lee, Betty Kent, Biddy Barton, Teddy Foster, Ronnie Grearder, Rob Ashley, The Dagenham Girl Pipers, Three Aberdonians, Les Allen, Laurie Day, Roy Willis, Will Hatton, Ethel Manners, Elsie and Doris Waters, The John Tiller Girls, the cast of Me and My Girl (Lupino Lane, George Graves, Betty Frankiss and Teddy St. Denis), Jack Barty, George Carney, Claphan and Dwyer, Harry Champion, Kate Carney, Will Fyffe, Florrie Forde, Marie Kendall, Gaston and Andree, Tommy Handley, G. S. Melvin, Talbot O'Farrell, Gillie Porter, Harry Tate, Vesta Victoria, Bransby Williams, Anona Winn	King George VI and Queen Elizabeth	

=== 1940s ===
No.	Date	Radio broadcast	Venue	Acts	Royal(s) present	Ref
17	5 November 1945	5 November 1945; BBC Light Programme	London Coliseum	Roy Mitchell, Jill Manners, The Nine Avalons, Jules Adrian, Grace Spero, Beryl Kaye, Vic Oliver, Maurice Colleano, George Doonan, Will Hay, Douglas Wakefield, Chuck O'Neil, Billy Nicholls, Peter Byrne, Michael Hunt, Billy Nelson, Roy Jeffries, Delya, Sid Field, Jerry Desmonde, Stella Moya, Denise Clifford, Wilson, Keppel and Betty, Webster Booth and Anne Ziegler, Tommy Trinder, Chappie D'Amato, Van Phillips, Reginald Burston.	King George VI, Queen Elizabeth, Princess Elizabeth and Princess Margaret	
18	4 November 1946	—N/a	London Palladium	From High Time – The Girls, Tony Hulley, Barbara Bentham, Brent Fields, Billy Castle, Bobby Tranter and Mary Naylor, The Cairoli Brothers, Nat Jackley with Harry Moreny, Dick Beamish, Arthur Vollum, Sammy Curtis, Bob Bromley and his puppets, Terry-Thomas Dance Ensemble with Alan and Blanche Lund, Gil Johnson, the Three Ross Sisters, Halama and Konarski, The Cabana Accordion Six, Nat Mills and Bobbie, Robert Lamouret, Arthur Askey, Harry Lester and his Hayseeds, Tessie O'Shea, Charlie Chester, Dick Henderson, Jimmy Jewel, Charlie Naughton, Jimmy Gold, Eddie Gray, El Granadas and Peter, Jack Jackie, Koba and Kalee, Reggie Redcliffe, Rene Strange, Henri Vadden, Sid Field with Jerry Desmonde, Alfie Dean, The Wallabies and the Palladium Boys & Girls, Ben Warriss, Marianne Lincoln, Oscar Natzka, Band of the Training Ship.	King George VI, Queen Elizabeth, Princess Elizabeth and Princess Margaret	
19	3 November 1947	—N/a	London Palladium	Hy Hazell, The Alec Thomas Quartet, Marilyn Hightower, Three Shades, Valerie Tandy, Bobbie Tranter, Tony Hulley, The Three Astaires, Hortobagyi Troupe, Billy Russell, Wilson, Keppel and Betty, Norman Evans, Borrah Minnevitch's Harmonica Rascals, Mervyn Saunders, Mona and Oliver & The Girls, Wally Boag, Bud Flanagan, Jimmy Nervo, Teddy Knox, Charlie Naughton, Jimmy Gold, Frank Holloway, Willie Carlisle, Freddie Malcom, Jack Durrant, Robert Wilson, The Dagenham Piper Girls, Vic & Joe Crastonian, James Currie's Water Spectacle, Alan Bailey, Terri Carol, Cynthia & Gladys, The Three Garcias, Levanda, Marie Louise, Mariora, Olga Varona, Eva May Wong, Bobbie Kimber, Dolores Gray & Bill Johnson, Laurel and Hardy, The Zoris, Tommy Trinder, Gracie Fields.	King George VI, Queen Elizabeth, Princess Elizabeth, Princess Margaret and Philip Mountbatten	
20	1 November 1948	—N/a	London Palladium	The Blackpool Tower Circusettes, The Cromwells, Kirsta and Kristel, The Myrons, Warren Latona and Sparks, Charlie Chester and his Radio Gang, Daphne Kiernander, Sky High Corps De Ballet, Jayne and Adam Di Gatano, The Colstons, Nicholas Brothers, The 24 John Tiller Girls, Ted Ray, Sid Field, George and Bert Bernard, Stewart McPherson, Randolph Sutton, Nellie Wallace, Billy Danvers, Ella Shields, Talbot O'Farrell, Gertie Gitana, G. H. Elliott, Ted Heath and his Band, Derek Roy, The Radio Revellers, The Melachrino Strings, Julie Andrews, The Luton Girls Choir, The Great Alexander Troupe, Arthur Askey, Buster Shaver and his trio of Lilliputians, The Crazy Gang, Danny Kaye, The Skyrockets Orchestra.	King George VI and Queen Elizabeth	
21	7 November 1949	—N/a	London Coliseum	John Sanger, Arthur Bell, Eric Coates, Phil Parke, Johnny Lockwood, Les Charlivels, Joy Nichols, Michael Bentine, Bill Johnson, Peter Cavanagh, Marilyn Hightower, Elsa and Waldo, Peggy Ryan and Ray McDonald, The Tiller Girls, Reginald Dixon, Band of the Royal Marines, Harvey, The Seven Ashtons, Wilfred Pickles, Dolores Gray, Borrah Minnevitch's Harmonica Rascals featuring Johnny Puleo, Maurice Chevalier, Noele Gordon, Ted Ray.	King George VI, Queen Elizabeth, Princess Elizabeth and Princess Margaret	

=== 1950s ===
No.	Date	Radio broadcast	Venue	Acts	Royal(s) present	Ref
22	13 November 1950	—N/a	London Palladium	Tommy Trinder, Sheila Matthews, The 20 John Tiller Girls, The Three Bentley Sisters, The Debonairs, Terrys Juveniles, Hall, Norman and Ladd, Max Bygraves, Billy Cotton and his Band, Frankie Howerd, The Five Smith Brothers, Kaye Ballard, Helen Gallagher, Carole Lynne, Allan Jones, The Merry Macs, Gracie Fields, The George Mitchell Glee Club, Jonathan Lucas, David Lober, Donald Peers, Jack Benny, Dinah Shore, Binnie Hale, Nat Jackley, Naughton and Gold, Max Wall, Nervo and Knox, Max Miller, Flanagan and Allen, The Band that Jack Built.	King George VI and Queen Elizabeth	
23	29 October 1951	—N/a	Victoria Palace Theatre	The Gang and 'Monsewer' Eddie Gray, The Cavendish Singers, The John Tiller Girls, Erica Yorke, The Victoria Palace Girls, The Marie De Vere Dancers, Vera Lynn, Harry Secombe, The Wiere Brothers, Stanley Black and the Dance Orchestra, Tony Fayne, David Evans, Richard Murdoch, Kenneth Horne, Arthur English, Sally Ann Howes, Jimmy Edwards, Florence Desmond, Norman Evans, Alan and Blanche Lund, Pearl Primus and her Company, Hoops – The Boys, Joaquin Pérez Fernandes and his Latin American Company, The Mary De Vere Dancers, Johnny Hutch and the Seven Volants, Sam Browne and his Singers, The Keyboard Quintette (Carroll Gibbons, Billy Thorburn, Ivor Moreton and Dave Kaye, Charlie Kunz), Patricia Morison, Barbara Bruce, Nervo and Knox, Naughton and Gold, Bud Flanagan, Miklos Gafni, Vera Lynn and Michael Dalton, Frances Day, Florence Desmond, Sally Ann Howes, Adelaide Hall, Sylvia Peters, Carole Lynne, Valerie Tandy, Anona Winn, Chesney Allen, Jimmy Gold, Gracie Fields, George Mitchell Choir, Jack Radcliffe, Cicely Courtneidge.	Queen Elizabeth and Princess Margaret (Note: King George VI was too ill to attend.)	
24	3 November 1952	9 November 1952; BBC Light Programme	London Palladium	The Victoria Palace Tiller Girls, The Three Barbour Brothers, Medlock and Marlowe, Crompton, Three Monarchs, Tony Hancock, Billy Cotton and his Band, Norman Wisdom, Winifred Atwell, Vic Oliver, Beverley Sisters, Deep River Boys, Billie Worth, Jeff Warren, Donald Burr, The Crazy Gang, Gracie Fields with the Ilford Girls Choir and the George Carden Ensemble, Warren, Latona and Sparks, Rob Murray, Terry-Thomas, Gerry Brereton, John Ellison, George Cameron, Ted Ray, Beniamino Gigli, Arthur Askey, Max Bygraves, Zoe Gail, Reginald Dixon, Patricia Kirkwood, Jimmy Edwards, Jack Jackson, Vera Lynn, Jewel and Warriss, Josef Locke, Joy Nichols, Fred Russell, Maurice Chevalier, Ian Wallace, The Band of the Coldstream Guards.	Queen Elizabeth II and Philip, Duke of Edinburgh	
25	2 November 1953	—N/a	London Coliseum	Peter Knight's Merry Makers, Harry Dawson, Jean Campbell, Pearl Carr, Dick James, Mackenzie Reid and Dorothy Elizabeth Webb, Alfred Marks, Edmund Hockridge, Tommy Cooper, Eve Boswell, Jack Warner, Stubby Kaye with members of the cast of Guys and Dolls, Jo, Jac and Joni, Anne Shelton, Max Bygraves, Sheila O'Neill and Veit Bethke, Danya and Alvarez, Gloria Nord, Len Liggett and Pam Murray with members from the Corps de Ballet and the Empire Pool Festival Choir, John Tiller Girls, Ethel Revnell, Henry Cotton, Jimmy James, Ronnie Ronalde, Vivian Blaine, Jimmy Edwards, Eamonn Andrews.	Queen Elizabeth II, Philip, Duke of Edinburgh and Princess Margaret	
26	1 November 1954	—N/a	London Palladium	Fay Lenore and the Palladium Boys & Girls, Schaller Brothers, George Mitchell Choir, Jimmy Wheeler, Eric Robinson Orchestra & Singers, Eddie Calvert, Joan Turner, Richard Hearne, Howard Keel, Chesney Allen, Arthur Askey, Max Bygraves, Bud Flanagan, Billy Russell, Donald B. Stewart, Brian Reece, Harry Green, Katie Boyle, Jack Hylton, Al Read, Norman Wisdom, Gillian Moran, Herbert Hare, Florence and Frederic, The Crazy Gang with Paul Cutts and Shirley Eaton, David Whitfield, Frankie Laine, Jack Parnell and his Orchestra, Ted Heath and his music, Dawn White and her Glamazons, John Tiller Girls, Rudy Horn, Noël Coward, Diana Churchill, Jack Buchanan, Joan Sims, Frankie Howerd, Gladys Cooper, Binnie Hale, Peter Sellers, Donald Wolfit, Elsie Randolph, Thora Hird, Leslie Henson, Dick Bentley, Michael Denison, Nigel Patrick, Thorley Walters, Anthony Steel, Brian Reece, Walter Crisham, Bruce Trent, Peggy Cummins, Shirley Eaton, Dulcie Gray, Shani Wallis, Bob Hope with Moira Lister, Jerry Desmonde and the Hope Repertory Company.	Queen Elizabeth II and Philip, Duke of Edinburgh	
27	13 April 1955	—N/a	Opera House Theatre, Blackpool (Note: The first Royal Variety Performance to be held outside London.)	Reginald Dixon, Lupino Lane, George Truzzi, Peter Glaze, Kenneth Sandford, Pamela Bromley, Vera Day, The John Tiller Girls, The Victoria Palace Girls and Boys, Kathryn Moore, The Flying De Pauls, The Barbour Brothers and Jean, The Amandis, The Crazy Gang, Morecambe and Wise, Bill Waddington, Josephine Anne, The Showgirls, Arthur Askey, Geraldo and his Orchestra, Jewel and Warriss, Littlewoods Girls Choir, Joan Regan, Alma Cogan, The Five Smith Brothers, George Formby, 1st Battalion The Liverpool Scottish (T.A.) (Queen's Own Cameron Highlanders), Beryl Grey with John Field, Jack Tripp with the John Tiller Girls, children from the Blackpool Tower Ballet, Charlie Cairoli with Paul, Wilfred and Mabel (Pickles), Albert Modley, Flanagan and Allen, Eddie Fisher with the BBC Northern Orchestra, Al Read.	Queen Elizabeth II and Philip, Duke of Edinburgh	
28	7 November 1955	—N/a	Victoria Palace Theatre	Tommy Trinder, Latona, Graham and Chandel, The Victoria Palace Boys and Girls, Dave King and Julia Channing, The Crazy Gang, Ruby Murray, Benny Hill with Olivia Dale, Jeremy Hawk and Ronnie Brody, Patricia Kirkwood with Robert Beatty, Douglas Byng, George Carden, Walter Crisham, John Gregson, Bobby Howes, Hugh McDermott, Terence Morgan and Brian Reece, Cyril Stapleton with the BBC Show Band and The Stargazers, Lena Horne, John Warner, Eleanor Drew, Dorothy Reynolds, Newton Blick, Yvonne Coulette, James Cairncross, Michael Meacham, Christine Finn, Michael Aldridge, Pat Heywood, Joseph Greig, Bob Harris, Johnnie Ray, Robert Dhery, Colette Brosset, Jacques Legras, Christian Duvalein, Pierre Olaf and Company, Alfred Drake, George Jessel, Doretta Morrow and Company, Leslie Henson, Jimmy Edwards, Richard Attenborough, Diana Dors, Edmund Willard, Bruce Seton, Emrys Jones, Lupino Lane, The Chinese Classical Theatre Company, Moscow State Folk Dance Company. Channing Pollock	Queen Elizabeth II and Philip, Duke of Edinburgh	
29	18 November 1957	—N/a	London Palladium	The Kaye Sisters, Max Bygraves, The George Carden Dancers, The George Mitchell Singers, The Goofers, Jimmy Logan, Harry Secombe with the Morriston Orpheus Choir, The Crazy Gang, Leo De Lyon, Gracie Fields, Dickie Henderson, Count Basie and his Orchestra, Ralph Reader and his Gang Show, Judy Garland, Jimmy Brooks, Bud Flanagan, Ben Lyon, Jerry Desmonde, Alfred Marks, Brian Reece, Mario Lanza, Norrie Paramor's Big Ben Banjo Band, Ronnie Hilton, Dickie Valentine, Malcolm Vaughan, Teddy Johnson, Dennis Lotis, Frankie Vaughan, David Whitfield, Herschel Henlere, Arthur Askey and Vera Lynn, Alicia Markova, Alma Cogan, The John Tiller Girls, Tommy Cooper, Winifred Atwell, Tommy Steele and his Steelmen.	Queen Elizabeth II and Philip, Duke of Edinburgh	
30	3 November 1958	9 November 1958; BBC Light Programme	London Coliseum	Talk of the Town Girls and Boys, The Stargazers, Yana and Max Bygraves, Shirley Ambrose, Margo Mitchell, Dawn Hughes, Terry James, Mary Mitchell, Gloria Kaye, Judith Harvey, Fay Laurie, Jane Burton, Christine Pocket, Jacqueline Warrell, Helen Wright, Gloria Davidson, Doreen Hermitage, Joan Jemison, Paddy James, Joyce White, Ruth Lawson, Roy Genson, Robert Lamont, Ray Tanva, Ian Kaye, Bill Harvey, Willie Martin, Karl Morley, Boyd MacKenzie, Peter Elliott, Paul Christian, The King Brothers, The Mudlarks, Beverley Sisters, The Charlivels, Tony Hancock, Cyril Stapleton and his Show Band, Frankie Vaughan, Bruce Forsyth, Bernard Bresslaw, Antonio and his Spanish Ballet Company, Roy Castle, Harry Secombe, Harry Worth, Lynette Ray, Hattie Jacques, Max Russell, G. H. Elliott, Hetty King, The George Carden Dancers, The George Mitchell Singers, The Ford Motor Works Military Band, The Dior Dancers, Victor Silvester and his Ballroom Orchestra, The Mecca Formation Dancers, David Nixon, Charlie Drake, Pat Boone, Mantovani, Adele Leigh, Eartha Kitt, Kenneth More, Norman Wisdom, Jerry Desmonde, Pip Hinton, Marion Grimaldi, Pamela Gale, Felix Felton, Terence Cooper, June Bronhill, Thomas Round, Rex Harrison, Julie Andrews, Stanley Holloway.	Queen Elizabeth II and Philip, Duke of Edinburgh	
31	23 June 1959	28 June 1959; BBC Light Programme	Palace Theatre, Manchester	Paddy Glyn, The Eight Mitchell Singers, The 20 John Tiller Girls, The Pietro Brothers, Marty Wilde, Cliff Richard, Harry Robertson, Lord Rockingham's XI, Cherry Wainer, Benny Hill, Al Read with Jimmy Clitheroe, Jean Louis Bert and Ilonka, The Dior Dancers, Belinda Wright, Jelke Yuresha, Jimmy Jewel and Ben Warriss, Roy Castle, BBC Northern Dance Orchestra with Sheila Buxton, Russ Conway, Ronnie Hilton, Jill Day, Marion Ryan, Dickie Henderson, Dora Bryan, Aileen Cochrane, Anne Shelton, Terry Wilson, Blackpool Tower Ballroom Children's Ballet, Michael Medwin, Alfie Bass, Bill Fraser, Ted Lune, Norman Rossington, Liberace, Arthur Askey, The Hallé Orchestra conducted by Sir John Barbirolli.	Queen Elizabeth the Queen Mother	

=== 1960s ===
No.	Date	Television broadcast	Venue	Host	Acts	Royal(s) present	Ref
32	16 May 1960	22 May 1960; ATV	Victoria Palace Theatre	—N/a	Max Bygraves, Nat King Cole, Russ Conway, Billy Cotton and his Band, The Crazy Gang, Sonia Rees, Sammy Davis, Jr., Lonnie Donegan, Diana Dors, Jimmy Edwards, Adam Faith, Bud Flanagan, Benny Hill, Robert Horton, Frankie Howerd, Hattie Jacques, Liberace, Vera Lynn, Bob Monkhouse, Cliff Richard & The Shadows, Tiller Girls, Norman Wisdom, Harry Worth, Ivor Emmanuel	Queen Elizabeth II and Prince Philip, Duke of Edinburgh	
33	6 November 1961	12 November 1961; ATV	Prince of Wales Theatre	—N/a	Acker Bilk, Kenny Ball & The Temperance Seven, Shirley Bassey, Jack Benny, George Burns, Lionel Blair, Max Bygraves, Maurice Chevalier, The Crazy Gang, Sammy Davis, Jr., Arthur Haynes, The McGuire Sisters, Morecambe and Wise, Nina & Frederik, Andy Stewart, Frankie Vaughan	Queen Elizabeth the Queen Mother	
34	29 October 1962	4 November 1962; BBC TV	London Palladium	—N/a	The Black and White Minstrels, Rudy Cardenas, Rosemary Clooney, Dickie Henderson, Frank Ifield, Eartha Kitt, Cleo Laine, Johnny Dankworth, Cliff Richard & The Shadows, Harry Secombe, Andy Stewart, Sophie Tucker, Mike & Bernie Winters Bob Hope with Edie Adams	Queen Elizabeth II and Prince Philip, Duke of Edinburgh	
35	4 November 1963	10 November 1963; ATV	Prince of Wales Theatre	—N/a	Harry Secombe (Television Presentation), The Clark Brothers, Luis Alberto del Paraná, Los Paraguayos, Charlie Drake, Tessa Davies, Susan Maughan, The Beatles, Dickie Henderson, Francis Brunn, Buddy Greco, Nadia Nerina, The Sleeping Beauty Cast, Joe Loss & His Orchestra, Larry Gretton, Ross MacManus, Rose Brennan, The Billy Petch Dancers, Wilfrid Brambell, Harry H. Corbett, Pinky & Perky, Jan & Vlasta Dalibor, Eric Sykes, Hattie Jacques, Michael Flanders, Donald Swann, Marlene Dietrich, Tommy Steele, & West End Half a Sixpence Cast, Harry Secombe & Pickwick cast	Queen Elizabeth the Queen Mother and Princess Margaret, Countess of Snowdon	
36	2 November 1964	8 November 1964; BBC1	London Palladium	—N/a	The John Tiller Girls, Tommy Cooper, The Bachelors, Gil Dova, Cilla Black, Millicent Martin, Kathy Kirby, Brenda Lee, Dennis Spicer, Morecambe and Wise, Gracie Fields, The Moiseyev Dance Company, Ralph Reader's Gang Show, Jimmy Tarbuck, Cliff Richard & The Shadows, Bob Newhart, Lena Horne with the Chico Hamilton Quartette	Queen Elizabeth II	
37	8 November 1965	14 November 1965; ATV	London Palladium	—N/a	Shirley Bassey, Tony Bennett, Jack Benny, Max Bygraves, The Carmenas, The Dave Clark Five, Peter Cook, Ken Dodd, Johnny Hallyday, Arthur Haynes, Hope and Keen, Frank Ifield, The Kaye Sisters, Neville King, Spike Milligan, Dudley Moore, Peter, Paul and Mary, Peter Sellers, Dusty Springfield, Sylvie Vartan	Queen Elizabeth II and Prince Philip, Duke of Edinburgh	
38	14 November 1966	20 November 1966; BBC1	London Palladium	Des O'Connor	The Bachelors, Bal Caron Trio, Gilbert Bécaud, The World Cup winning England football team, Sammy Davis, Jr., Jack Douglas, Hugh Forgie, Christopher Gable, Nadia Nerina, Juliette Gréco, Frankie Howerd, Jerry Lewis, Kenneth McKellar, Henry Mancini, Marvo and Dolores, Matt Monro, Wayne Newton, The Pietro Brothers, Gene Pitney, The Seekers, Tommy Steele	Queen Elizabeth the Queen Mother and the Earl of Snowdon	
39	13 November 1967	19 November 1967; ATV	London Palladium	—N/a	The Bluebell Girls, Tanya, Rolf Harris, Lulu, Sandie Shaw, Val Doonican, Tommy Cooper, Romanian National Dance Company and Orchestra, The Rockin' Berries, Ken Dodd, Vikki Carr, Mireille Mathieu, Tom Jones, Bob Hope	Queen Elizabeth II and Prince Philip, Duke of Edinburgh	
40	18 November 1968	24 November 1968; BBC1	London Palladium	Des O'Connor	Aimi MacDonald and Lionel Blair, Arthur Askey, Valente Valente, Frankie Howerd and Mike Yarwood, Sacha Distel, Czechoslovak State Song and Dance Ensemble, Ted Rogers, Manitas de Plata and Company, Engelbert Humperdinck, Agnes O'Connell's London Irish Girl Pipers, Val Doonican, Petula Clark, Ron Moody, Andre Tahon and Company, Diana Ross and The Supremes	Queen Elizabeth the Queen Mother, Charles, Prince of Wales, Princess Anne, Princess Margaret, Countess of Snowdon and the Earl of Snowdon	
41	10 November 1969	16 November 1969; ATV	London Palladium	Des O'Connor	Des O'Connor, The Veterans, Roy Castle, Cilla Black, Danny La Rue, Shari Lewis, Harry Secombe, Ginger Rogers, Buddy Rich, Moira Anderson, Scènes de ballet, Ronnie Corbett, Mireille Mathieu, Herb Alpert's Tijuana Brass, Frankie Howerd, Johnnie Spence and his Orchestra, The Mike Sammes Singers, Tom Jones	Queen Elizabeth II and Prince Philip, Duke of Edinburgh	

=== 1970s ===
No.	Date	Television broadcast	Venue	Host	Acts	Royal(s) present	Ref
42	10 November 1970	15 November 1970; BBC1	London Palladium	Max Bygraves	The Pamela Devis Dancers, Peter Noone & Herman's Hermits, Freddie Starr, Peter Rostal and Paul Schaefer (piano duet), Sandy Powell and Kay White, Max Bygraves, Dionne Warwick, The Doriss Girls, The Syd Lawrence Orchestra, Leslie Crowther and Sheila Bernette, The Black Theatre of Prague, Caterina Valente, Marty Feldman and Tim Brooke-Taylor, Andy Williams.	Queen Elizabeth the Queen Mother and Princess Margaret, Countess of Snowdon	
43	15 November 1971	21 November 1971; ATV	London Palladium	Bruce Forsyth	The Young Generation, The Villams, Bruce Forsyth, Dailey and Wayne, The Stupids, Lovelace Watkins, Norman Collier, Hughie Green, The Little Angels of Korea, Jack Parnell and his Orchestra, The New Seekers, The New Dollys, Ken Goodwin, Sacha Distel, Stéphane Grappelli, Tommy Cooper, Shirley Bassey.	Queen Elizabeth II	
44	30 October 1972	5 November 1972; BBC1	London Palladium	Dickie Henderson	Los Diablos Del Bombo, Dickie Henderson, Los Paraguayos, Mike Yarwood, Elton John, Danny La Rue, Liberace, Trio Hoganas, Rod Hull and Emu, The Jackson 5, Jack Jones, Ken Dodd, Warren Mitchell, Tony Booth, Una Stubbs, Dandy Nichols, Carol Channing.	Queen Elizabeth the Queen Mother, Princess Margaret, Countess of Snowdon and Princess Anne	
45	26 November 1973	2 December 1973; ATV	London Palladium	Dick Emery	Shaw Taylor (Television Presentation), Dougie Squires' Second Generation, Dick Emery, Francis Van Dyke, Cliff Richard, Phillipe Genty & Company, Les Dawson, Rudolf Nureyev, Lynn Seymour, José Luis Moreno, Peters & Lee, Ronnie Corbett, Duke Ellington & His Orchestra.	Queen Elizabeth II and Prince Philip, Duke of Edinburgh	
46	18 November 1974	24 November 1974; BBC1	London Palladium	Noele Gordon	Noele Gordon, A Salute to Vaudeville, Ted Rogers, The Hungarian State Dance Company, Billy Dainty, Josephine Baker, Paul Melba, Dance Theatre of Harlem, Paper Lace, George Carl, Roy Castle, Perry Como, Jack Parnell and his Orchestra.	Queen Elizabeth the Queen Mother	
47	10 November 1975	16 November 1975; ATV	London Palladium	Bruce Forsyth	Bruce Forsyth, Michael Crawford as Frank Spencer, KwaZulu, Kris Kremo (juggler), the cast of Dad's Army (musical), Count Basie Orchestra, Larry Parker (comedy magician), Janet Brown (impressionist as Margaret Thatcher), Michael Crawford and the cast of Billy, Dukes and Lee, Ruth Welting, Telly Savalas, Charles Aznavour, Rhos Male Voice Choir, Harry Secombe, Vera Lynn.	Queen Elizabeth II and Prince Philip, Duke of Edinburgh	
48	15 November 1976	15 November 1976; BBC1 (Note: The first Royal Variety Performance to be televised live.)	London Palladium	Max Bygraves	Lionel Blair, Dance Theatre of Harlem, Los Reales Del Paraguay, Roger De Courcey, Lena Zavaroni, Arthur Mitchell, Gilbert Bécaud, Tom O'Connor, Dawson Chance, Wayne King, Mike Yarwood, Shirley Bassey.	Queen Elizabeth the Queen Mother	
49 (Note: The Silver Jubilee Royal Variety Gala.)	21 November 1977	29 November 1977; ATV	London Palladium	Bob Hope	Bob Hope, Julie Andrews, Paul Anka, Pam Ayres, Harry Belafonte, Brotherhood of Man, Tommy Cooper, Alan King, Cleo Laine and Johnny Dankworth, John Williams, Little and Large, Shirley MacLaine, Jim Henson's Muppets, Rudolf Nureyev (with Yoko Morishita), Jack Parnell	Queen Elizabeth II, Prince Philip, Duke of Edinburgh and Charles, Prince of Wales	
50	13 November 1978	13 November 1978; BBC1	London Palladium	David Jacobs	Arthur Askey, Lionel Blair, Leslie Crowther, Bobby Crush, Charlie Drake, Cyril Fletcher, Rolf Harris, John Inman, David Nixon, Beverley Sisters, Marti Caine, Wendy Craig, Sandra Dickinson, Esther Rantzen, Dilys Watling, June Whitfield, Pepe and his friends, Paul Daniels, Harry Secombe, The King Sisters, Mary O'Hara, Showaddywaddy, Danny La Rue, The Krankies, Andy Stewart, Moira Anderson, Scottish Ballet, National Youth Jazz Orchestra, Acker Bilk, Kenny Ball, Max Bygraves, The Kaye Sisters, The Nolan Sisters, Anne Shelton, Wayne Sleep, Lesley Collier, Diane Langton, Max Boyce, Gracie Fields	Queen Elizabeth the Queen Mother	
51	10 November 1979	2 December 1979; ATV	Theatre Royal, Drury Lane	—N/a	Elaine Stritch, Gemma Craven, Jim Davidson, Tommy Cooper, James Galway, Red Buttons, Ned Sherrin, Millicent Martin, David Kernan, Julia McKenzie, Marti Caine, Elisabeth Welch, Dr Evadne Hinge and Dame Hilda Bracket, Noel Edmonds, Amii Stewart, Boney M., Bill Haley & His Comets, Bernie Clifton, Vladimir Vasiliev and Ekaterina Maximova, Pas de deux, Les Dawson, Yul Brynner, Carol Channing (Note: Carol Channing was not listed in the programme, nor is she listed on the EABF website, however her presence is verified by video of the programme posted to YouTube.) and Virginia McKenna	Queen Elizabeth II	

=== 1980s ===
No.	Date	Television broadcast	Venue	Host(s)	Acts	Royal(s) present	Ref
52	17 November 1980	23 November 1980; BBC1	London Palladium	—N/a (Note: The broadcast was introduced by Angela Rippon in 1980 and David Jacobs in 1982 rather than a traditional on-stage host.)	The Joe Loss Orchestra, Una Stubbs and Lionel Blair, Roy Hudd, Arthur Askey, Chesney Allen and Billy Dainty, Charlie Chester, Charlie Drake, Arthur English, Cyril Fletcher, Richard Murdoch, Sandy Powell, Tommy Trinder, Ben Warriss, Paul Squires, Bruce Forsyth, Grace Kennedy, Sheena Easton, Rowan Atkinson, Wall Street Crash, Harry Worth, Cleo Laine, Henry Mancini, Peggy Lee, Victor Borge, Aretha Franklin, Sammy Davis, Jr., Larry Hagman, Mary Martin, Danny Kaye	Queen Elizabeth the Queen Mother	
53	23 November 1981	29 November 1981; ATV	Theatre Royal, Drury Lane	Dickie Henderson	Shaw Taylor (Television Presentation), Robert Hardy (Introduction), Thais Clark, Vernel Bagneris, Ylvia Williams, Topsy Chapman, Patti Boulaye, Pearly Gates, Precious Wilson, The Clark Brothers, Kenny Lynch, Jim Davidson, Lenny Henry, Patrick Moore, Itzhak Perlman, John Inman, Henry Cooper, Tim Rice, Lonnie Donegan, Marty Wilde, Acker Bilk, The Searchers, Donovan, Lulu, Mike Yarwood, Suzanne Danielle, Alvin Stardust, Adam & The Ants, The Shadows, Cliff Richard, Cambridge Buskers, Anita Harris, Jimmy Tarbuck, Andrew Lloyd Webber, Stephanie Lawrence, Julian Lloyd Webber, Elaine Paige, Leslie Caron, Mireille Mathieu, Moulin Rouge Can-Can Dancers	Queen Elizabeth II	
54	8 November 1982	14 November 1982; BBC1	Theatre Royal, Drury Lane	—N/a	Richard Harris, Chris Power and Howard Keel, Helen Gelzer, Anna Dawson, Tony Adams, The Pirates of Penzance, The Pirate King, Roy Hudd, Christopher Timothy, Louis Benjamin, Peter Glaze, Tommy Godfrey, Billy Gray, Lesley Collier, David Wall, Richard Stilgoe, Don Smoothey, Ami McDonald, Ruth Madoc, Isla St Clair, Kenneth Connor, Leslie Crowther, Billy Dainty, John Inman, Pete Murray, Bernie Winters, Karen Kay, Suzanne Danielle, Joyce Blair, John Hanson, Gloria Hunniford, Jan Leeming, Esther Rantzen, Vince Hill, Diane Langton, Lorna Dallas, Dennis Waterman, Liz Robertson, Topol, Wall Street Crash, Anton Rodgers, Bonnie Langford, Sylvester McCoy, Michael Praed, Chris Langham, Peter Skellern, James Casey, Roy Castle, Eli Woods, George Cole, Pamela Stephenson, Tim Curry, Sheena Easton, Moira Anderson, Bucks Fizz, Victor Spinetti, Amanda Redman, Robert Longden, Jack Jones, Angela Rippon, Millicent Martin, Frankie Howerd, Ethel Merman	Queen Elizabeth the Queen Mother	
55	7 November 1983	13 November 1983; LWT	Theatre Royal, Drury Lane	Gene Kelly	Scott Sherrin, Gillian Gregory, Royal Ballet School, Bonnie Langford, The Frank and Kay Mercer Latin American Formation Team, The Jukebox Company, Steve Merritt, Mark Donnelly. Michael Barrymore, Wayne Sleep, Graham Fletcher, Fred Evans, Tony Kemp, Sarah Kennedy, Billy Dainty, Monica Mason, Merle Park and David Wall, Kelly Monteith, Sheila White, Grace Kennedy, Clarke Peters, Finola Hughes, The Roly Polys, Paul Henry, Sheila O'Neill, Gemma Craven, James Smillie, Julia McKenzie, Twiggy, Tommy Tune, Diana Moran, The British Amateur Gymnastics Team, Rock Steady Crew, George Carl, The Dancin' Company, Natalia Makarova, Anthony Dowell	Queen Elizabeth II	
56	19 November 1984	25 November 1984; BBC1	Victoria Palace Theatre	Max Bygraves	Dame Edna Everage, Frank Thornton, Leslie Crowther, Billy Dainty, Paul Nicholas, Bernie Winters, Jimmy Cricket, The Dancers, Mr Magoo, Brian Andro, Stuart Fell, The Acrobats, Anthony Gatto, Keith Harris, Denis Norden, The Bell Ringers, Les Dennis and Dustin Gee, Sir Les Patterson, Angharad Rees, Matthew Kelly, Charlie Drake, Russell Grant, Frank Finlay, Simon Callow, Eileen Atkins, Jean Marsh, Harvey and the Wallbangers, Paul Eddington, The Tillers, Ronnie Corbett, On Your Toes, Roy Hudd, Terry Wogan, James Galway, Henry Mancini, Bill Owen, Peter Sallis, Brian Wilde, David Jacobs, Howard Keel, Paul Daniels, Members of the cast of Me and My Girl	Queen Elizabeth the Queen Mother, Charles, Prince of Wales, Diana, Princess of Wales and Lady Sarah Armstrong-Jones	
57	7 November 1985	1 December 1985; LWT	Theatre Royal, Drury Lane	—N/a (Note: Voiceover by Robin Houston who introduced the programme.)	Babes on Broadway, Show Boat, Gary Wilmot, The Screen Goddesses (Sarah Payne, Rula Lenska, Gloria Hunniford and Stephanie Lawrence), Rolf Harris, Louis Benjamin, Jean Simmons, Guys and Dolls (David Healy, Betsy Brantley and Norman Rossington), On the Town (Tim Flavin, Graham Fletcher, Peter Alex-Newton and Elisabeth Welch), Triplets (Michael Aspel, Jan Leeming, Russell Harty), 42nd Street (Philip Gould, Alice Faye, Roy Castle and Fred Evans), Doreen Wells and Tudor Davies, Ron Moody, Sarah Brightman, Norman Wisdom, Su Pollard, Joan Collins, Roni Page, Steve Devereaux, Celeste Holm and Paul Nicholas, Frankie Vaughan and Barbara King, Martin Shaw and Simon Bowman, Liz Robertson, Gigi (Beryl Reid, Amanda Waring, Geoffrey Burridge), Dennis Waterman and Maureen Lipman, José Carreras	Queen Elizabeth II and Prince Philip, Duke of Edinburgh	
58	24 November 1986	29 November 1986; BBC1	Theatre Royal, Drury Lane	Peter Ustinov	Alan Randall, Sue Lawley, Su Pollard and Ruth Madoc, Kit and The Widow, Marti Webb, Bob Monkhouse, Marti Caine, Angela Rippon, Petula Clark, Rory Bremner, Peking Opera, Victoria Wood, The Bluebells, Carolyn Pickles, Stéphane Grappelli, Nana Mouskouri, Victor Borge, Frank Carson, Valerie Masterson, Max Bygraves with the cast of EastEnders, Lulu, Michael Davis, Ronnie Corbett, Paul Nicholas, Lesley Collier, Stephen Jefferies, Peggy Spencer, Latin American Formation Team, the cast of Only Fools and Horses (David Jason, Nicholas Lyndhurst and Buster Merryfield), Cyd Charisse, Simon Howe, Tyne Daly, Sharon Gless, Ken Dodd, Huddersfield Choral Society, Val Doonican, Gloria Hunniford, Aled Jones	Queen Elizabeth the Queen Mother and Sarah, Duchess of York	
59	23 November 1987	29 November 1987; LWT	London Palladium	—N/a (Note: Various guest stars stepped in to introduce specific acts)	Anthony Newley, The Alan Harding Dancers, Jessica Martin, Gary Wilmot, Peter Goodwright, Hilary O'Neil, Allan Stewart, Bernie Winters, Leslie Crowther, George Carl, Bobby Davro, Johnny Logan, Les Dawson, The Roly Polys, Danny La Rue, Dolores Gray, Cannon & Ball, Eartha Kitt, Richard Branson, Hale & Pace, James Galway, Jimmy Tarbuck, Kenny Lynch, Shirley Bassey, Five Star, Ronn Lucas, Les Misérables (Dudu Fisher, Kaho Shimada & Michael McGuire), Stephen Fry, Hugh Laurie, Mel Tormé, George Shearing, Michael Barrymore, Sarah Brightman, Mike Yarwood, Johnnie Ray, Rosemary Clooney, Harry Secombe, Tom Jones	Queen Elizabeth II and Prince Philip, Duke of Edinburgh	
60	24 November 1988	26 November 1988; BBC1	London Palladium	Ronnie Corbett and Bruce Forsyth	Ronnie Corbett, Erasure, Bruce Forsyth, Mickey Rooney and Ann Miller, The Chongqing Troupe, Brian Conley, Kylie Minogue, The cast of Neighbours, Mel Smith and Griff Rhys Jones, Cliff Richard, the cast of Bread, Jackie Mason, Julio Iglesias, Bananarama, a-ha, The Golden Girls, Bob Monkhouse, Russ Abbot, Bella Emberg, Paul Daniels and Debbie McGee	Queen Elizabeth the Queen Mother and Princess Margaret, Countess of Snowdon	
61	20 November 1989	25 November 1989; ITV	London Palladium	John Mills	Michael Ball, David Essex, Janet Jackson, Rosemarie Ford, Paul Nicholas, Lisa Waddingham, George Marshall, the cast of Coronation Street, Chris de Burgh, Nigel Kennedy, Freddie Starr, Melvyn Bragg, Frank Bruno, Harry Carpenter, David Frost, Hinge and Bracket, Diana Rigg, Selina Scott, Kenny Seagrove, Edward Woodward, Tina Turner, Northern Ballet Theatre, Elayne Boosler, Joe Longthorne, Julian Lloyd Webber, the cast of Folies Bergère, The Argentine Gauchos, Lance Burton, Jerry Lewis, Paula Abdul	Queen Elizabeth II and Prince Philip, Duke of Edinburgh	

=== 1990s ===
No.	Date	Television broadcast	Venue	Compere	Acts	Royal(s) present	Ref
62 (Note: Billed as "A Royal Birthday Gala" to celebrate the 90th birthday of the Queen Mother.)	19 July 1990	4 August 1990; BBC1	London Palladium	John Gielgud	Sir John Mills, Wayne Dobson, Sir John Gielgud, Lisa Maxwell, Hayley Mills, Lionel Blair, Jeffrey Holland, Angharad Rees, Christopher Cazenove, Robert Meadmore, Bonnie Langford, Anneka Rice, Dannii Minogue, Mark Curry, Jonathon Morris, Anita Harris, Jill Gascoine, Band of the Grenadier Guards, Geraldine McEwan, Wayne Sleep, Stephen Fry, Michael Denison and Dulcie Gray, Marilyn Hill-Smith, Arthur Davies, James Galway, Bernie Winters, Leslie Crowther, Simon Cadell, Patricia Hodge, Robert Hardy, Dame Vera Lynn, Howard Keel, Willard White, Roger Moore, Michael Caine, Dame Kiri Te Kanawa, Rowan Atkinson, Cliff Richard, Sir Richard Attenborough, Darcey Bussell, Irek Mukhamedov, Elaine Paige, Plácido Domingo	Queen Elizabeth the Queen Mother, Queen Elizabeth II, Prince Philip, Duke of Edinburgh and Princess Margaret, Countess of Snowdon	
63	20 November 1991	30 November 1991; ITV	Theatre Royal, Drury Lane	David Frost	Diana Ross, Kenny Andrews, Michael Ball, Simon Bowman, Linda Mae Brewer, Beverly Craven, Jim Dale, Les Dawson, Clinton Derricks Carroll, John Diedrich, Mike Doyle, Chip Esten, Rosemarie Ford, Ann Howard, Roy Hudd, Lisa Hull, Gloria Hunniford, Eric Idle, Barry James, Peter Land, Cherida Langford, Patti Lupone, Jillie Mack, Gareth Marks, Jackie Mason, Paul J. Medford, Claire Moore, Julia McKenzie, Omar Okai, Elaine Paige, Billy Pearce, The Roly Polys, Frances Ruffelle, Lea Salonga, Ned Sherrin, Scott Sherrin, Wayne Sleep, Dig Wayne, Marti Webb, Colm Wilkinson, Sandy Strallen, Susan-Jane Tanner, The Cast of 'Buddy', The Dagenham Girl Pipers, The London Community Gospel Choir, The Sixites Tiller Girls, The Stephen Hill Singers, The Sylvia Young Theatre School, The Young Voronezh Balalaikas, the Cast of Les Misérables, the Cast of Cats, the Cast of The Phantom of the Opera, the Cast of Miss Saigon, the Cast of Evita. Featuring a tribute to Cameron Mackintosh: 'Hey, Mr. Producer!'	Queen Elizabeth II	
64	7 December 1992	12 December 1992; BBC1	Dominion Theatre	Leslie Caron	The cast of Cats, Kiki Dee with Ria Jones, Jacqui Scott, Philip Gould, Paul Gyngell, Brian Conley, Phillip Schofield and the children of Ocklynge Junior School & Kentwood Junior School Choirs, Reva Rice and Lon Satton, Jimmy Tarbuck, Chinese State Circus, Chris Tarrant, Gloria Estefan, Steve Coogan, Jim Bailey, Mel Smith and Griff Rhys Jones, Barry Manilow, Michael Ball, London Community Gospel Choir, Jim Tavaré, The Nigel Kennedy Ensemble, Sharon Gless, Mike Michaels, Tim Rice, Montserrat Caballé, Rita Rudner, Tom Conti, Bolshoi Ballet with Yuri Klevtsov and Nadezhda Gracheva, Gloria Hunniford, Michael Crawford with the London Choral Society	Charles, Prince of Wales and Diana, Princess of Wales	
65	15 November 1993	20 November 1993; ITV	Dominion Theatre	Cilla Black	Grease with Craig McLachlan and Debbie Gibson, Cilla Black, Frank Carson, Jim Henson's Muppets, Right Said Fred, Lesley Garrett, Brian Conley, Simon Drake, Grigorovich Ballet of the Bolshoi Theatre, Bee Gees, Forever Plaid, Bradley Walsh, Darren Day, Joe Pasquale, Lulu, Pickwick with Sir Harry Secombe and Roy Castle, Michael Barrymore, London Community Gospel Choir	Queen Elizabeth II and Prince Philip, Duke of Edinburgh	
66	28 November 1994	3 December 1994; BBC1	Dominion Theatre	Brian Conley	Bruce Forsyth, Ria Jones, Laine Theatre Arts Dancers, Italia Conti Academy of Theatre Arts Choir, Ronnie Corbett, The Passing Zone, Lulu, Billy Pearce, the cast of Oliver!, Dame Shirley Bassey, Gary Wilmot, Jim Tavare, Gareth Rowan, Clive Anderson, Angela Gheorghiu, Viviana Durante and Zoltan Solymosi, Frank Skinner, Larry Grayson, Tony Bennett, Terry Wogan, the cast of Riverdance, Take That	Charles, Prince of Wales	
67 (Note: This performance was held on the same night that the controversial BBC Panorama interview with Diana, Princess of Wales aired on BBC One.)	20 November 1995	25 November 1995; ITV	Dominion Theatre	Des O'Connor	Carol Kenyon, Bruce Forsyth, Allan Stewart, Robson & Jerome, The Pendragons, Mack & Mabel, Alistair McGowan, Marvin Hamlisch, Bob Downe, Elaine Paige, Cirque du Soleil, Hale and Pace, the cast of Riverdance, Joe Pasquale, Jolson – Brian Conley, Cliff Richard Olivia Newton-John	Queen Elizabeth II	
68	28 October 1996	10 November 1996; BBC1	Dominion Theatre	Bob Monkhouse	Bob Monkhouse, Moscow State Circus, David Strassman, Eternal, Pauline Quirke and Linda Robson, Robson & Jerome, Steve Coogan, Victor Borge, Joaquín Cortés, Brian Conley, Jim Davidson, Vik and Fabrini, Darcey Bussell and Jonathon Cope, Joan Rivers, Martin Guerre, Jackie Mason, Tom Jones, the cast of The Brittas Empire	Charles, Prince of Wales	
69	30 November 1997	6 December 1997; ITV	Victoria Palace Theatre	Des O'Connor	Chicago featuring Ruthie Henshall, Henry Goodman, Ute Lemper and Nigel Planer, Joe Pasquale, Enya, Barbara Cook and Michael Ball, Darius Matthews and Daddy's Little Princess, Jonathan Ross, Andy Leach, Stephen Mulhern, Alan Brazil & the Four Poster Beds, Andy Ford, Lydia Griffiths, Vladimir, Fame – The Musical, Dr Trevor James, Andi Peters, Spice Girls, Cirque du Soleil, Harry Hill, Michael Bolton, Matthew Bourne's Swan Lake featuring Adam Cooper and Scott Ambler, Jim Davidson, Celine Dion, The Two Ronnies	Queen Elizabeth II and Prince Philip, Duke of Edinburgh	
70	6 December 1998	20 December 1998; BBC One	Lyceum Theatre	Ronan Keating and Ulrika Jonsson	Paulette Ivory, Laine Theatre Arts Dancers, Lily Savage, B*Witched, Peter Kay, Eclipse, Oklahoma!, Jim Tavaré, Martine McCutcheon, Stephen Gately, Barry Manilow, Annie – the Musical, Phil Cool, Boyzone, Rambert Dance Company, Ennio Marchetto, Roberto Alagna and Angela Gheorghiu, Stomp, Spice Girls	Charles, Prince of Wales	
71	1 December 1999	4 December 1999; ITV	Birmingham Hippodrome	Brian Conley	The Royal Ballet Sinfonia, Jean Butler and Colin Dunne, The Corrs, Steps, Bradley Walsh, Billy Geraghty, Paul Zerdin, Charlotte Church, Ed Byrne, Westlife, Birmingham Royal Ballet, Ken Dodd, The Shaolin Monks, Terry Alderton, Andrea Bocelli, LeAnn Rimes, Lennox Lewis, Barry Manilow, Cliff Richard, The Lion King	Queen Elizabeth II	

=== 2000s ===
No.	Date	Television broadcast	Venue	Presenter(s)	Acts	Royal(s) present	Ref
72	5 December 2000	17 December 2000; BBC One	Dominion Theatre	Brian Conley	Hey Pachuco – Martin Crewes and the RVP Dancers, Jane McDonald, Ben Elton, Kylie Minogue, Blast!, Jane Horrocks, Julian Clary, Martin Clunes, Omagh Community Youth Choir, Mark Williams, Cirque du Soleil, Tim Vine, Ronan Keating, The King and I, Elaine Paige, Notre Dame de Paris, Ronnie Corbett, Dame Shirley Bassey, African Footprint, Richard Stilgoe and Peter Skellern, Celestine Walcott-Gordon, Bryn Terfel, Dominic Holland, Lionel Richie, The Beautiful Game and Westlife.	Charles, Prince of Wales	
73	26 November 2001	28 November 2001; ITV	Dominion Theatre	Julian Clary	Hear'Say, Jethro, Cher, Anatoliy Zalevsky, Adam Watkiss, Samantha Mumba, Vinnie Jones, Charlotte Church and Robert Meadmore, Alessandro Safina, Denise van Outen, Lily Savage, Cilla Black, Barbara Windsor, Donny Osmond, Jon Culshaw, Craig David, The Full Monty, Cirque du Soleil, Al Murray – The Pub Landlord, The Corrs, Russell Watson, Jennifer Lopez, Gypsy: A Musical Fable, Jackie Mason and Elton John.	Queen Elizabeth II and Prince Philip, Duke of Edinburgh	
74	2 December 2002	15 December 2002; BBC One	Hammersmith Apollo	—N/a (Note: Various comedians and performers introduced acts throughout the evening)	Bond, Will Young, Liberty X, Paul Zerdin, Brian Conley, Stomp, Men in Coats, Diana Krall and Natalie Cole, Bombay Dreams, Jimmy Carr, Kylie Minogue, Our House, Lee Mack, Elaine Stritch, Contact, Omid Djalili, Enrique Iglesias, Bob Monkhouse, Gareth Gates, Ronan Keating, Anastacia and Shania Twain.	Charles, Prince of Wales	
75	24 November 2003	26 November 2003; ITV	Edinburgh Festival Theatre (Note: The first Royal Variety Performance to be held in Scotland.)	Cat Deeley	Strathclyde Police Pipe Band, ScottishPower Pipe Band, The Drambuie Kirklston Pipe Band, Laine Theatre Arts Dancers, Flur na H-alba, Rachel Stevens, Ronnie Corbett, Daniel Bedingfield, The Oriental Swan (Hua Wong, Chen Wen and Wen Xiaoyan), Busted, Danny Bhoy, Hayley Westenra, Fiona Phillips, Donny Osmond, The Osmonds, Thoroughly Modern Millie, Gloria Estefan, Al Murray – The Pub Landlord, Jamie Cullum, Katie Melua, Cirque du Soleil, Frank Bruno, Westlife and Luciano Pavarotti.	Queen Elizabeth II and Prince Philip, Duke of Edinburgh	
76	14 December 2004	15 December 2004; BBC One	London Coliseum	Shane Richie	Shane Richie, Natasha Kaplinsky, Funny Girls, Jamelia, Jimmy Carr, Brian McFadden and Delta Goodrem, Round the Horne Revisited, Girls Aloud, The Producers, Josh Groban, Ennio Marchetto, Michael Bublé, Lemar, Elton John, Billy Elliot the Musical, Dara Ó Briain, Royal Variety Dancers and Capital Voices, Denise van Outen, David Omer and Yamil Borges, Will Smith, Sharon Osbourne, Ozzy Osbourne, Gwen Stefani, Liza Minnelli, English National Opera and Cliff Richard	Charles, Prince of Wales	
77	21 November 2005	11 December 2005; ITV	Wales Millennium Centre, Cardiff	Michael Parkinson and Sharon Osbourne	"Seventy-six Trombones" led by Bradley Walsh, Blue Man Group, Katherine Jenkins, Catherine Tate, Charlotte Church, David Walliams, Guys and Dolls, The Skating Willers, Il Divo, Alan Carr, Will Young, Funny Girls, Andre Portasio, Cliff Richard, Ozzy Osbourne, Nicola Benedetti, Tomasz Reichelt, Caesar Twins, Dave Spikey, McFly, Andrea Bocelli and Bryn Terfel and Dame Shirley Bassey	Queen Elizabeth II and Prince Philip, Duke of Edinburgh	
78	4 December 2006	12 December 2006; BBC One	London Coliseum	Jonathan Ross	John Barrowman with The Puppini Sisters and Capital Voices, the cast of Spamalot, Omid Djalili, the cast of The Sound of Music, Sugababes, Meat Loaf, Jamelia, David and Dania, Jason Byrne, Take That, the cast of Wicked, Barry Manilow, the cast of Avenue Q, James Morrison, Jump, Ken Dodd, Rod Stewart and Michael McIntyre	Charles, Prince of Wales and Camilla, Duchess of Cornwall	
79	3 December 2007	9 December 2007; ITV	Liverpool Empire Theatre	Phillip Schofield and Kate Thornton	The Heavy Cavalry and Cambrai Band, Seal, Viva la Diva (Katherine Jenkins and Darcey Bussell), Al Murray – The Pub Landlord, Enrique Iglesias, Big Howard, Little Howard, the cast of Hairspray, James Blunt, Russell Brand, English National Ballet, Raymond Crowe, David Jordan, MOMIX – The White Widow, Paul Potts, Dame Kiri Te Kanawa, Bon Jovi, Lang Lang, Kanye West, Joan Rivers, Dany Daniel & Edina, Teatro, Stephen K. Amos, Philip Achille, Jimmy Tarbuck and Natasha Day	Queen Elizabeth II and Prince Philip, Duke of Edinburgh	
80	11 December 2008	17 December 2008; BBC One	London Palladium	Various (Note: Graham Norton, Tess Daly, Andrew Lloyd Webber, Emma Bunton, Mathew Horne, James Corden, Tom Daley, Myleene Klass, Jimmy Tarbuck, Craig Revel Horwood, Arlene Phillips, Len Goodman, Bruno Tonioli, Josh Hartnett, Rebecca Adlington, Brendan Fraser, Christine Bleakley, Adrian Chiles, Connie Fisher, John Barrowman, Pete Waterman, Nicki Chapman, Neil Fox and Peter Kay)	Jimmy Carr, Brian May and Kerry Ellis, John Barrowman, Josh Groban, Leona Lewis, Rhod Gilbert, Rihanna, Les Ballets Trockadero de Monte Carlo, Armstrong and Miller, The Pussycat Dolls, Naturally 7, Duffy, Take That, Only Men Aloud!, George Sampson, Michael McIntyre, Geraldine McQueen, Cliff Richard and The Shadows, the West End casts of Jersey Boys, La Cage Aux Folles, The Lion King and Zorro	Charles, Prince of Wales and Camilla, Duchess of Cornwall	
81 (Note: The first Royal Variety Performance to be staged in Blackpool since 1955. Ticket sales had to be suspended early due to overwhelming demand.)	7 December 2009	16 December 2009; ITV	Opera House Theatre, Blackpool	Peter Kay	Michael Bublé, Alexandra Burke, Hal Cruttenden, Miley Cyrus, Diversity, Adam Hills, Lady Gaga, Bob Golding, Roy Walker Les 7 Doigts de la Main, Katherine Jenkins, Paddy McGuinness, Jason Manford, Pilobolus featuring the music of David Poe, Mika, Bette Midler accompanied by Jake Shimabukuro, André Rieu, Faryl Smith and The Soldiers, Paul Zerdin, the Heavy Cavalry and Cambrai Band, the cast of Sister Act the Musical, with Whoopi Goldberg and the cast of Here Come the Girls (Anastacia, Lulu and Chaka Khan)	Queen Elizabeth II and Prince Philip, Duke of Edinburgh	

=== 2010s ===
No.	Date	Television broadcast	Venue	Presenter	Acts	Royal(s) present	Ref
82	9 December 2010	16 December 2010; BBC One	London Palladium	Michael McIntyre	Adele, John Bishop, Susan Boyle, Chelsea Pensioners, Cheryl Cole, Jamie Cullum & Rumer, Ray Davies & Paloma Faith, Micky Flanagan, Lee Mack, Sarah Millican, Kylie Minogue, N-Dubz, Spelbound, Take That, Russell Watson & Principal Dancers from The Royal Ballet (Lauren Cuthbertson & Nehemiah Kish), Daniel Whiston, Jack Whitehall and the casts of Les Misérables (led by Samantha Barks, and the Valjeans to commemorate the 25th Anniversary with Alfie Boe, Colm Wilkinson, Simon Bowman and John Owen-Jones) and The Wizard of Oz (Danielle Hope and the Carmel Thomas Youth Singers)	Charles, Prince of Wales and Camilla, Duchess of Cornwall	
83	5 December 2011	14 December 2011; ITV	The Lowry, Salford Quays, Greater Manchester	Peter Kay	Tony Bennett, Barry Manilow, Cee Lo Green, Jason Manford, Pixie Lott, Jai McDowall, Leona Lewis, Hayley Westenra, Rolando Villazón, Penn & Teller, Greg Davies, Jimeoin, Tim Minchin, David Garrett, Omid Djalili, Sam Wills, Nicole Scherzinger & the Phantoms from The Phantom of the Opera (Ramin Karimloo, Simon Bowman, John Owen-Jones, and Earl Carpenter), Il Divo, Base Berlin, Mick Miller, the cast of Singin' in the Rain (led by Adam Cooper), and the Royal Variety Drumming Ensemble (Kodō, The Dhol Foundation, Stomp, 3RUN, and the Royal Marines Corps of Drums)	Anne, Princess Royal	
84	19 November 2012	3 December 2012; ITV	Royal Albert Hall	David Walliams	Robbie Williams, Heather Headley, Kylie Minogue, Bruce Forsyth, Girls Aloud, Rod Stewart, One Direction, Andrea Bocelli, Katherine Jenkins, Placido Domingo, Neil Diamond, Alan Carr & David Walliams, Ashleigh and Pudsey, Rhod Gilbert, Bill Bailey, Jimmy Tarbuck, Ronnie Corbett, Alicia Keys, Des O'Connor, Ballet Revolución, Nicola Benedetti, Bradley Walsh, China's Three Tenors (Dai Yuqiang, Wei Song, & Warren Mok), Matilda the Musical, and an ensemble of the "Best of Britain's Got Talent" (Diversity, Spelbound, Stavros Flatley, and Paul Potts)	Queen Elizabeth II and Prince Philip, Duke of Edinburgh	
85	25 November 2013	9 December 2013; ITV	London Palladium	John Bishop	Olly Murs, Robbie Williams, Gary Barlow, Attraction, Dame Edna Everage, the cast of Charlie and the Chocolate Factory the Musical, Bryn Terfel, Jessie J, Mary J. Blige, Jimmy Carr, Torvill and Dean, Chas & Dave, the cast of I Can't Sing! The X Factor Musical, Caro Emerald, Flavia Cacace, Gareth Malone & Voices, Hal Cruttenden, Jason Byrne, John Newman, Rizzle Kicks, Seann Walsh and the cast of Stephen Ward the Musical	Charles, Prince of Wales and Camilla, Duchess of Cornwall	
86	13 November 2014	8 December 2014; ITV	London Palladium	Michael McIntyre	Bette Midler, Dame Shirley Bassey, Ellie Goulding, Collabro, McBusted, Demi Lovato, Jack Whitehall, Simply Red, Russell Kane, Ed Sheeran, the cast of Miss Saigon, Pumeza, Alfie Boe, Sarah Millican, Ladysmith Black Mambazo, Trevor Noah, Rod Woodward, Stephen Mulhern, La Soiree and One Direction	Prince William, Duke of Cambridge and Catherine, Duchess of Cambridge	
87	13 November 2015	8 December 2015; ITV	Royal Albert Hall	Jack Whitehall	Beverley Knight, Brandon Flowers, Chris Ramsey, Cirque du Soleil, The Corrs, Sir Elton John, Jeff Lynne's ELO, Josh Groban, Jules, Matisse & Friends, Kacey Musgraves, Kylie Minogue, Little Mix, the cast of Mary Poppins, Matt Forde, One Direction, The Play That Goes Wrong, Ricky Martin and Romesh Ranganathan	Prince Harry	
88 (Note: Sheridan Smith was due to appear but withdrew following the death of her father.)	6 December 2016	13 December 2016; ITV	Hammersmith Apollo	David Walliams	ABC, the cast of An American in Paris, Gary Barlow and the cast of The Girls, Rob Beckett, Leslie Caron, Chuckle Brothers, Cirque du Soleil, Bernie Clifton, Alan Davies, Diversity, DNCE, Escala, Tom Fletcher, Barry Gibb, Richard Jones, Joe Lycett, OneRepublic, Amber Riley, Emeli Sandé, Sting, Robbie Williams, Lady Gaga	Charles, Prince of Wales and Camilla, Duchess of Cornwall	
89	24 November 2017	19 December 2017; ITV	London Palladium	Miranda Hart	The cast of 42nd Street, Tom Allen, the cast of Annie, Michael Ball, the cast of Benidorm, James Blunt, Alfie Boe, Circus Abyssinia, Paloma Faith, Kelsey Grammer, Cassidy Janson, The Killers, Beverley Knight, Jason Manford, the cast of Miranda, Tokio Myers, Amber Riley, The Script, Seal, Louis Tomlinson, Colin Cloud	Prince William, Duke of Cambridge and Catherine, Duchess of Cambridge	
90	19 November 2018	11 December 2018; ITV	London Palladium	Greg Davies	Alex Horne, The Horne Section, Take That, the cast of Hamilton, George Ezra, Clean Bandit, MARINA, the cast of Tina – The Tina Turner Musical, Andrea and Matteo Bocelli, Lost Voice Guy, Rick Astley, Rhod Gilbert, Cirque du Soleil, Sigrid, Sheku Kanneh-Mason, Circus 1903, Ed Gamble, Rose Matafeo, Gad Elmaleh and Rod Woodward	Prince Harry, Duke of Sussex and Meghan, Duchess of Sussex	
91	18 November 2019	10 December 2019; ITV	London Palladium	Rob Beckett and Romesh Ranganathan	Colin Thackery, Rod Stewart, Lewis Capaldi, Kerry Godliman, Emeli Sandé, Mabel, Harry Connick Jr, Luke Evans, Come from Away, Groan Ups, Frank Skinner and Robbie Williams	Prince William, Duke of Cambridge and Catherine, Duchess of Cambridge	

=== 2020s ===
No.	Date	Television broadcast	Venue	Presenter	Acts	Royal(s) present	Ref
92	29 November 2020	8 December 2020; ITV	Opera House Theatre, Blackpool	Jason Manford	Captain Sir Tom Moore with Michael Ball and the NHS Choir, Gary Barlow, Samantha Barks, Celeste, Melanie C, Sheridan Smith, Steps, Stephen Mulhern, Marisha Wallace, The Black Blues Brothers, Jon Courtenay, Jo Caulfield, Daliso Chaponda	None (Note: First time in the event's history that no royal family or audience members were present due to the COVID-19 pandemic. The then Prince of Wales instead appeared virtually via a pre-recorded message to the show's cast.)	
93	18 November 2021	19 December 2021; ITV	Royal Albert Hall	Alan Carr	Cast of Moulin Rouge, James Blunt, Anne-Marie, Bill Bailey, Years & Years, Messoudi Brothers, Elvis Costello, Cast of Matilda, Gregory Porter, Chris McCausland, Cirque Du Soleil, Keala Settle, Judi Love, Josh Widdicombe, Sir Rod Stewart, Ed Sheeran	Prince William, Duke of Cambridge and Catherine, Duchess of Cambridge	
94	1 December 2022	20 December 2022; ITV	Royal Albert Hall	Lee Mack	Andrew Lloyd Webber, Gary Barlow, London Youth Choir, Nile Rodgers, Chic, George Ezra, Ellie Goulding, Sam Ryder, Becky Hill, Cast of Cabaret, Cirque du Soleil, Rita Wilson, Gregory Porter, Frank Skinner, David Baddiel, Lightning Seeds, The Ehrlich Brothers, Fatma Said, Gifford Circus, Al Murray, Maisie Adam, Omid Djalili, Axel Blake, Cast of Newsies	Prince Edward, Earl of Wessex and Forfar and Sophie, Countess of Wessex and Forfar	
95	30 November 2023	17 December 2023; ITV	Royal Albert Hall	Bradley Walsh	Cher, Crazy For You, Derren Brown's Unbelivable, Disney 100 Medley, Samantha Barks, Ellie Taylor, Hannah Waddingham with the Eno Chorus, Lang Lang and Lucy Illingworth, Mavelo, McFly, Melanie C and Ben Forster, National Youth Choir, Paloma Faith, Rick Astley, Rosie Jones, Simon Brodkin, Sister Act ft. Beverley Knight, The Little Big Things, Tom Allen, Viggo Venn, Welsh Guards Band, Zara Larsson	William, Prince of Wales, Catherine, Princess of Wales, Victoria, Crown Princess of Sweden and Prince Daniel, Duke of Västergötland	
96	22 November 2024	15 December 2024; ITV	Royal Albert Hall	Alan Carr and Amanda Holden	Penn & Teller, Sydnie Christmas, casts of Oliver!, Starlight Express and The Devil Wears Prada, Nemo, James Bay, Sophie Ellis-Bextor, Stephen Mulhern, Cirque Du Soleil, English National Ballet, Ellie Taylor, Matt Forde, Scott Bennett, Larry Dean, Change and Check Choir led by Marti Pellow, The Comedy About Spies, Marisha Wallace	King Charles III (Note: Queen Camilla was expected to attend but was absent due to illness)	
97	19 November 2025	21 December 2025; ITV	Royal Albert Hall	Jason Manford	Jessie J, Harry Moulding, the cast of Les Miserables also including - Michael Ball, Matt Lucas, Katy Secombe, Bradley Jaden, Killian Donnelly, the cast of Paddington, Katherine Jenkins, Madness, Laufey, Sir Stephen Fry, Tom Davis, Mick Miller, cast of the BBC's Dead Ringers, Sir Bob Geldof, Midge Ure, cast of Just For One Day, the cast of Kinky Boots featuring Johannes Radebe, Adrian Stoica	William, Prince of Wales and Catherine, Princess of Wales	
98	20 November 2026		Royal Albert Hall	Jason Manford	Idina Menzel, Stephen Schwartz, the cast of The Greatest Showman, Hawkstone Farmers Choir, Vanessa Williams, Jack Savoretti, Andrea Bocelli, Billy Elliot the Musical, Avenue Q, the cast of Jesus Christ Superstar led by Sam Ryder, Ramadhani Brothers, Cirque Alice, Milton Jones, Phil Wang, Operation Mincemeat, Alfie Boe	King Charles III and Queen Camilla	
