= Changing of the Guard =

The Changing of the Guard or The Change of the Guard may refer to:

- Guard mounting, a formal ceremony in which sentries providing ceremonial guard duties at important institutions are relieved by a new batch of sentries

== Music ==
- The Changing of the Guard (album), a 2010 album by Starflyer 59
- Changing of the Guard (T. S. Monk album), 1993
- "Changing of the Guards", a 1978 song by Bob Dylan
- "The Changing of the Guard", a 1931 song composed by Mr. Flotsam and Mr. Jetsam and performed by Mr. Jetsam the same year
- "Changing of the Guards", a song by Pusha T
- "Changing of the Guard", a song by the band Exodus from their album Impact Is Imminent
- "The Changing of the Guard", a song by Marquis of Kensington
- "Change of the Guard", a song by Steely Dan from their album Can't Buy a Thrill
- "Changing of the Guard", a song by The Style Council from their album Confessions of a Pop Group

== Other uses ==
- The Changing of the Guard (film), a 1962 French-Italian comedy film
- "The Changing of the Guard" (The Twilight Zone), a 1962 episode of The Twilight Zone
- The Changing of the Guard (novel), the eighth book in the Star Wars Jedi Quest series
