= Flotsam and Jetsam =

Flotsam and Jetsam may refer to:

- Flotsam, jetsam, lagan and derelict, refuse found in the ocean.

== Fictional characters ==
- Flotsam and Jetsam (The Little Mermaid), two characters in The Little Mermaid
- Flotsam and Jetsam, two police officers in the Hollywood Station series by Joseph Wambaugh

== Literature ==
- "Flotsam and Jetsam", a chapter of The Two Towers by J. R. R. Tolkien
- "Flotsam and Jetsam", a short story by W. Somerset Maugham

== Music ==
- Flotsam and Jetsam (band), a thrash metal band from Phoenix, Arizona
  - Flotsam and Jetsam (Flotsam and Jetsam album), 2016
- Flotsam and Jetsam (EP), a 2006 EP by Mystery Jets
- "Flotsam and Jetsam", a song by Peter Gabriel from eponymous second album
- Flotsam and Jetsam (Peter Gabriel album), 2019 compilation album

== Television ==
- "Flotsam and Jetsam" (Being Human), an episode of Being Human
- "Flotsam and Jetsam", a Series F episode of the television series QI (2009)

== Film ==
- Flotsam and Jetsam (film), a 2022 film by Chang Tso-chi

== See also ==
- Flotsam (disambiguation)
- Flotsam Jetsam, a compilation album by Robert Wyatt
- Jetsam (disambiguation)
- Mr. Flotsam and Mr. Jetsam, an Anglo-Australian musical comedy duo of the 1920s and 1930s
