= Bentley Collingwood Hilliam =

British singer, songwriter, and musician (1890–1968)

- Also known as: B. C. Hilliam
- Born: Bentley Collingwood Smailes; 6 November 1890; Scarborough, North Yorkshire, England
- Died: 19 December 1968 (aged 78)
- Occupations: Musician; singer; songwriter
- Formerly of: Mr. Flotsam and Mr. Jetsam

Bentley Collingwood Hilliam (né Smailes; 6 November 1890 – 19 December 1968), usually credited as B. C. Hilliam, was an English singer, songwriter and musician, and the first-named member of the comedy duo Mr. Flotsam and Mr. Jetsam (Mr. Jetsam was Malcolm McEachern).

== Early life ==
Hilliam was born in Scarborough, North Yorkshire, in 1890, as Bentley Collingwood Smailes. He began his career as an entertainer at local functions, under the name Lloyd Holland, and also attended the local boys' school, Scarborough College, from 1902 to 1906. Hilliam wrote a series of odes for the school magazine under the pseudonym Aimless, an anagram of Smailes. He later changed his name permanently from Smailes to Hilliam.

During World War I, Hilliam served as a Lieutenant in the Canadian Engineers.

== Career ==
As Mr. Flotsam and Mr. Jetsam, Hilliam wrote most of the duo's songs, played the piano, and sang in a "light, high tenor voice". The duo's only film appearance is in the prelude of the 1936 Tod Slaughter melodrama The Crimes of Stephen Hawke.

Hilliam also wrote music and lyrics, such as Ladies of Leamington, and was musical director for the stage play Buddies, also starring in his own concert-party shows, Flotsam's Follies, whose cast included a young Tony Hancock.

Hilliam appeared as a castaway on the BBC Radio programme Desert Island Discs on 3 August 1959.

== Personal life ==
He married Mona C. Barrett-Lennard, his second wife, in December 1926 in Lambeth, London.

In 1935, Hilliam appeared in court after his first wife attempted to have him declared bankrupt for failure to pay alimony. His address was given as residing at Cadnam, Hampshire, England, and formerly West Hill, Highgate, London. On 23 May 1935, a conditional order of discharge was made. The case continued, with an adjournment in October of that year, when his address was given as Robin Grove, West Hill.

== Bibliography ==
- Flotsam's Follies: The Autobiography of B C Hilliam. Arthur Barron. 1948.
