= Jetsam (disambiguation) =

Jetsam is any cargo that is intentionally discarded from a ship or wreckage.

Jetsam may also refer to:

- Jetsam Moraine, in Antarctica
- Jetsam (film), a 2007 British thriller
- "Jetsam" (short story), a short story by Kerry Greenwood
- Mr. Jetsam or Malcolm McEachern, part of the Australian musical comedy duo Mr. Flotsam and Mr. Jetsam

== See also ==
- Flotsam and Jetsam (disambiguation)
