= Al Read =

British radio comedian (1909–1987)

- Born: Alfred Read; 3 March 1909; Broughton, Salford, Lancashire, England
- Died: 9 September 1987 (aged 78); Northallerton, North Yorkshire, England
- Occupations: Comedian, businessman

Alfred Read (3 March 1909 – 9 September 1987) was a British radio comedian active throughout the 1950s and 1960s. Originally a businessman, he has been described as highly influential on British comedy.

== Early life ==
Read was born in Broughton, Salford, Lancashire. On leaving school he worked at the family meat-processing firm, E. and H. Read Ltd, initially as a salesman before becoming a director in his early 20s. He always wanted to perform - on one occasion, when he was 18, he performed impressions of Maurice Chevalier in clubs in Bolton before being found by his father and having to return to work as a meat-products salesman. After his father died he started running the family business while continuing to take opportunities to entertain at local dinners and in clubs.

== Early business career ==
He became a prosperous and well-respected local businessman. In the Second World War his company won a lucrative contract with the NAAFI to supply sausages, enabling him to spend more time in the evenings as an after-dinner speaker. He honed his skills with carefully observed characterisations ranging from drunks to know-alls and cheeky children. After moving to Lytham St Annes he spent time playing golf, where he met many of the show business figures who performed in nearby Blackpool, and started active attempts to develop a second career as a comedian. In 1948 he paid a local theatre producer to let him perform in a show on the South Pier, but the performance was unsuccessful owing to Read's stage fright and he returned to his business interests.

== Comedy career ==
In early 1950 he hosted a dinner for business contacts in Manchester and entertained them with some of his monologues and dialogues in which he played both voices. His humour was observational and was about Northern English working class people, often in a domestic situation. According to writer Graham McCann: "Most professional comedians, before Al Read, concentrated on telling gags and/or short but obviously contrived tall tales. Here, in stark contrast, was someone talking about the kind of experience that most people in the audience had endured, except he was exaggerating it just enough to make the listeners laugh not only at the protagonists but also at themselves." The response to Read was so good that it was overheard by another guest coincidentally staying at the same hotel, regional BBC Radio producer Bowker Andrews, who invited him to perform the routine on his radio show Variety Fanfare. Broadcast on 17 February 1950 from the Hulme Hippodrome in Manchester, it launched Read's comedy career.

Read quickly became popular on regional and then national radio broadcasts, such as Variety Bandbox and Workers' Playtime. Unusually for the time, his humour reflected everyday life, situations and characters, widely recognisable and only slightly exaggerated for comic effect. According to McCann: "His ability to flit back and forth between speakers and personalities was impressive in itself, but the seemingly effortless yet unfailingly precise rhythms of his speech, and the deftness of his key turns of phrase, were even more remarkable." McCann described him as "pioneering", with an "immense" influence on British comedy.

In 1951 he was invited by bandleader Henry Hall to star in the summer season at Blackpool's Central Pier, and the King invited him to perform at Windsor Castle. He recorded monthly editions of his programme, The Al Read Show, in advance, allowing him to diverge from the usual radio variety show format. It featured guest performers including Jimmy Edwards and Pat Kirkwood. The programme was one of the most popular radio comedy shows in the UK in the 1950s and 1960s. Up to 35 million people listened to it each week. The introduction to his radio show was usually "Al Read: introducing us to ourselves"; and he himself described his work as "pictures of life". His catchphrases "Right, Monkey!" and "You'll be lucky – I say, you'll be lucky!", and "And he was strong", were well known. The Al Read Show series was recorded as outside broadcasts from the Hulme Hippodrome, rented on Sundays by the BBC, with archived papers dating recordings between 1952 and 1955.

In 1954 he appeared high on the bill at the Royal Variety Performance at the London Palladium, and in 1959 he appeared with comedian Jimmy Clitheroe in the Royal Northern Variety Performance, in the presence of the Queen Mother, at the Palace Theatre, Manchester. The American comedian Bob Newhart came to an arrangement with Read to adapt and perform some of his routines, with the result that some of the material originally written and developed by Read, such as "The Driving Instructor", became associated more with Newhart.

In 1963 Read headed a six-part variety series for ITV called Life and Al Read, made and videotaped by ABC Television and shown on Sunday afternoons in many ITV regions. The first edition shown by ABC had monologues by Al entitled "The Railway Station", "A Mayfair Cocktail Party", "The Wife in her Kitchen", and "How to Park a Motor Car"; and his special guests were Shani Wallis and The King Brothers. A second series of seven episodes followed in October 1964 but was only shown wholly in the two ABC regions, with Ulster Television showing the first five episodes. Read appears to have changed his approach for this series. "A policeman, an engine driver, a bus conductor, a canteen manageress, a goalkeeper ... these are the roles undertaken by Al Read in his new series 'Life and Al Read' starting on ITV tomorrow. For the first time in his career, he will be dreaming the various parts he portrays." In 1966 a BBC TV series called Al Read Says What a Life! was broadcast. However Read's humour did not transfer very well to television, with a critic in The Stage commenting: "I'm only interested in what he has to say – I don't care what he looks like." His final TV series, It's All In Life, in 1973, was also unsuccessful, and Read returned to radio for a final series in 1976.

== Later life ==
He retired from performance in the 1970s while continuing to run his business interests from homes in Yorkshire and Spain. In 1984 a further series of radio shows, Such Is Life, was broadcast, drawing on privately recorded routines from earlier years since the BBC recordings had been destroyed. Read published an autobiography, It's All in the Book, the same year.

== Death ==
Read died in hospital in Northallerton, Yorkshire, in 1987, aged 78, following a series of strokes.

== The Al Read Show (Radio) ==
Radio series summaries taken from Radio Times Genome listings alongside broadcast dates as detailed in 'Radio Comedy 1938-1968' by Andy Foster and Steve Furst (1996, Virgin Publishing, Ltd). These have been arranged to fit into monthly or weekly broadcasting patterns with all broadcast on the Light Programme except where indicated. Autobiographical and compilation series also included.

Series Title	No of Episodes	First Broadcast	Details
The Al Read Show	1	18/09/1951	With Jimmy Edwards, Pat Kirkwood, The Kordites, Northern Variety Orchestra Conducted by Vilem Tausky. Produced by Ronnie Taylor.
The Al Read Show	5	21/09/1952 22/10/1952 04/12/1952 29/12/1952 19/02/1953	Approximate monthly episodes, broadcast along with repeats on varying days and times. Featuring Jimmy Edwards, Louise Traill, The Kordites and the Augmented Northern Variety Orchestra conducted by Vilem Tausky. Produced by Ronnie Taylor.
The Al Read Show	4	08/10/1953 05/11/1953 26/01/1954 15/02/1954	Approximate monthly episodes, broadcast along with repeats on varying days and times. Featuring the Lifetimers and the Augmented Northern Variety Orchestra Conducted by Vilem Tausky. Produced by Ronnie Taylor.
The Al Read Show	6	02/09/1954 26/10/1954 25/11/1954 04/01/1954 25/01/1954 22/02/1955	Approximate monthly episodes, broadcast along with repeats on varying days and times. Featuring musical guests and the Augmented Northern Variety Orchestra conducted by Alyn Ainsworth. Produced by Ronnie Taylor.
The Al Read Show	7	02/09/1955 25/09/1955 08/11/1955 07/12/1955 22/12/1955 14/02/1956 01/04/1956	Approximate monthly episodes, broadcast along with repeats on varying days and times. Featuring musical guests and the Augmented Northern Variety Orchestra conducted by Alyn Ainsworth. Produced by Ronnie Taylor.
The Al Read Show	1	11/09/1956	Featuring Rawicz and Landauer, The Coronets, Geraldo and his Orchestra. Produced by Ronnie Taylor.
The Al Read Show	4	02/12/1956 09/12/1956 16/12/1956 22/12/1956	Weekly episodes (Sunday at 10:30, repeats various) followed by Christmas Show (Wed at 13:10, repeated Sat 29th at 21:30). Featuring The Kordites and the BBC Northern Variety Orchestra, conducted by Alyn Ainsworth. Produced by Ronnie Taylor.
The Al Read Show	3	02/02/1957 03/03/1957 24/03/1957	Approximate monthly episodes, broadcast along with repeats on varying days and times. Featuring The Kordites and the BBC Northern Variety Orchestra, conducted by Alyn Ainsworth. Produced by Ronnie Taylor.
The Al Read Show	4	23/09/1957 21/10/1957 18/11/1957 25/12/1957	Approximate monthly episodes, broadcast along with repeats on varying days and times. Featuring The Kordites and the BBC Northern Variety Orchestra, conducted by Alyn Ainsworth. Produced by Ronnie Taylor.
The Al Read Show	13	29/09/1958 to 22/12/1958	Weekly episodes, broadcast Monday at 21:00 (episodes 3 and 9 at 20:30), repeated following Sunday at 18:30. With The Allegros and the BBC Northern Dance Orchestra conducted by Alyn Ainsworth. Produced by Ronnie Taylor. Second repeat of episodes 1 to 12 in the following year, from 21 March to 6th June 1969. Episode 6 (3rd Nov 1958) repeated on 7 Sept 1959 as part of 'The Best of the Best' celebration.
Al Read '64	13	27/09/1964 to 20/12/1964	Weekly episodes, broadcast Sunday 18:30 and repeated the following Friday at 20:00. With The Morgan James Duo (E1-6), The Seekers (E7-13), Alan Wheatley (E1), Ronnie Taylor (E1), Valerie Masters (E2), Toni Endon (E3), Jackie Trent (E4), Donna Douglas (E5), Anne Taylor (E6), Rosemary Squires (E7), Sheila Buxton (E8), Ronnie Carroll (E9), June Marlow (E10), Craig Douglas (E11), Patsy Anne Noble (E12) and Susan Lane (E13).
The Al Read Show	13	12/12/1965 to 06/03/1966	Weekly episodes, broadcast on BBC Radio 2, Sunday at 13:30 and repeated the following Thursday at 20:00. With Rawicz and Landauer (E1/2/4/5/6/7/8), The Raindrops (E1/2/5/6/10), Julie De Marco (E3), Terry Burton (E4), Bettine Le Beau (E4), The Hollies (E7/8), Susan Maughan (E9), The Countrymen (E9), Paul Andrews (E10), Janie Marden (E11), The New Faces (E11), Anita Harris (E12/13), The Barron Knights (E12/13) and Woolf Phillips and His Orchestra (E1-13). Devised by Al Read, written by Ronnie Taylor, produced by Bill Worsley
The Al Read Show '68	6	14/01/1968 to 18/02/1968	Weekly episodes, broadcast on BBC Radio 2, Sunday at 14:00 and repeated the following Wednesday at 19:45. With Clinton Ford (E1/2/3), Julie Rogers (E4), Anita Harris (E5), Jackie Trent (E6) and The New Faces (E1-6). Script by Ronnie Taylor, orchestra directed by Neil Richardson, produced by John Browell.
The Al Read Show	6	05/10/1969 to 09/11/1969	Weekly episodes, broadcast on BBC Radio 2, Sunday at 14:00 and repeated on Monday at 20:45. Second repeat of series in May/June 1970 on BBC Radio 4. With guest singing star Helen Shapiro (E1), The Karlins (E2), Lois Lane (E3), Julie Rogers (E4), Barbara Law (E5), Rosemary Squires (E6) and George Bradley and His Orchestra (E1-6). Script by Ronnie Taylor, produced by John Browell.
Al Read Expo	10	19/07/1970 to 20/09/1970	Weekly episodes, broadcast on BBC Radio 2, Sunday at 14:01 and repeated on Monday at 20:15. With Julie Rogers (E1-10), Max Harris and His Amazing Dance Band (E1-8), Geoff Alderson and His Orchestra (E9-10). Written by Ronnie Taylor, produced by John Browell.
Al Read Classics	6	04/04/1976 to 09/05/1976	Weekly episodes re-recorded from original scripts. With Kenny Ball and his Jazzmen (E1/2), Alex Welsh and his Band (E3/4) and The Settlers (E5/6). Script by Ronnie Taylor, produced by John Browell. Broadcast on BBC Radio 2, Sunday at 14:02 and repeated Saturday at 19:02.
Such is Life	4	07/01/1987 to 28/01/1987	Al Read looks through the pages of his 1985 autobiography ‘It's All in the Book’. Producer Mike Craig, BBC Manchester. Broadcast on Wednesday at 22:00 and repeated posthumously March/April 1988.
The Al Read Show	3	07/10/1995 14/10/1995 28/10/1995	Compilation series, broadcast Saturday at 19:00. Produced by Mike Craig.
The Al Read Show	4	26/11/1998 03/12/1998 10/12/1998 17/12/1998	Second compilation series, broadcast Thursday at 21:00.

Surviving editions held by the BBC Sound Archive:

First Broadcast	Repeated	Description
25 November 1954	4 July 2004; 13 March 2005; 30 April 2006; 24 June 2007; 6 January 2008	Dad! Dad! Is that Al Read? He's a classic comedy act, isn't he, Dad? Vintage humour from November 1954, isn't it, Dad?
25 January 1955	No repeat	
15 November 1955	11 July 2004; 20 March 2005; 7 May 2006; 1 July 2007; 13 January 2008	The sausage maker from Salford turned king of the comedy catchphrase stars in this episode first broadcast in 1955.
6 February 1966	12 November 1998; 18 July 2004; 27 March 2005; 14 May 2006; 8 July 2007; 20 January 2008	The sausage maker from Salford turned king of the comedy catchphrase stars in this episode, first broadcast in 1966, featuring his best-loved characters and timeless humour.
October 1995	26 November 1998; 27 July 2004; 3 April 2005; 21 May 2006; 15 July 2007; 27 January 2008	Al Read with all you ever needed to know about health, courting, marriage, kids and football, from the northern comic's monologues of the 1950s.
October 1995	3 December 1998; 1 August 2004; 10 April 2005; 28 May 2006; 22 July 2007; 3 February 2008	Ken Bruce introduces the Northern comic's monologues from the 1950s. Arriving home late, Al's efforts to relax are thwarted by his wife.
October 1995	10 December 1998; 8 August 2004; 17 April 2005; 4 June 2006; 29 July 2007; 10 February 2008	Right Monkey! A collection of Al Read's 1950s monologues. Al lifts the lid off horse racing. Compiled in October 1995 by Mike Craig.
October 1995	17 December 1998; 15 August 2004; 24 April 2005; 11 June 2006; 5 August 2007; 17 February 2008	Classic comedy from Salford's favourite son. Al Read looks at the very British institutions of hospitals, the post office and noisy neighbours. From December 1998.
October 1995	24 December 1998; 22 August 2004; 1 May 2005; 18 June 2006; 12 August 2007; 24 February 2008	Al Read gives his views on the fire brigade, the joys of driving and the morning after the night before. From December 1998.
