= G. S. Melvin =

Scottish pantomime dame and comedian

- Born: George Spence Melvin; 20 February 1886; Aberdeen, Scotland
- Died: 2 December 1946 (aged 60); Datchet, Buckinghamshire, England
- Occupation(s): Comedian, pantomimist
- Years active: 1890s–1946

George Spence Melvin (20 February 1886 – 2 December 1946) was a Scottish music hall comedian and noted pantomime dame.

== Biography ==
Melvin was born in Old Machar, Aberdeen, Scotland. His father was a stage actor and producer, and Melvin first appeared on stage at the age of five doing a parody of his father's act. Later, he performed as an Irish comedian under the name Hugh Donovan and collaborated with his father in the Garden and the Melvin Quintet before going solo.

Reverting to his birth name, he made his first London appearance in 1908, and was seen by an American agent who booked him on a tour of the Orpheum Circuit of vaudeville theatres. He made further tours of the U.S. in 1912 and 1924, and also performed in South Africa. Theatre historian Roy Busby described Melvin as "a clever artiste [who] appealed to both broad and subtle tastes in comedy; he was a great quick-change artist and a burlesque comedian... His music hall characters ranged from a Victorian dandy to a Clydeside stoker... ".

Melvin was also a popular pantomime dame, especially at the Theatre Royal, Drury Lane. During the 1920s he developed a style of female impersonation, parodying hikers, girl guides, cyclists, and other devotees of outdoor activities. His songs included "I Like to Jump Upon a Bike", "Gladys, The Girl Guide", and "I'm Happy When I'm Hiking" (written by Ralph Butler and Raymond Wallace), which was adopted as a hikers' anthem. He performed in the Royal Variety Performances in 1921, 1932, and 1938.

He drowned in 1946, at the age of 60, in floods on the River Thames at Datchet in Buckinghamshire (now Berkshire) whilst appearing at the Drury Lane Theatre. His body was recovered downstream several weeks later.

== Sources and external links ==
- The Impresarios Wylie–Tate
