= Caesar Twins =

Polish theatrical-gymnastics team

The Caesar Twins (born September 19, 1980 in Bydgoszcz, Poland) are a theatrical-gymnastics team made up of Pierre Caesar and Pablo Caesar.

== Early life ==
Pierre and Pablo are identical twins born in Bydgoszcz, Poland. The brothers began gymnastics at 5 years old. At age 17, they became Youth World Champions in acrobatic sports.

== Career ==
At 18, they started performing in a modern German circus. In 2002, while performing an act called "Wheel of Death", Pablo fell 16 meters to the floor. As reported by newspapers at the time, some people in the audience at first thought the fall was part of the act. In reality, Pablo was severely injured and required extensive surgery and months of rehabilitation. He persevered with his brother as a training partner, and together they brought Pablo back into gymnastic fitness, rebuilding his muscles and coordination.

In 2004, the Caesar Twins starred in the cabaret La Clique, at which they officially premiered their renewed twin act. They went on to the Edinburgh Festival Fringe that year, where they returned in 2005, selling out their entire run, and again in 2006, featuring a dual twin show with the Lombard Twins.

The duo's self-titled show runs about 90 minutes, offering an entertaining combination of aerial and ground gymnastics, tricking the audience, especially about which twin is which, and telling their own life stories, including Pablo’s 2002 fall and rebirth through recovery. The show ends with a unique routine, in which the two brothers do a gymnastics routine in and around a large, clear acrylic glass bowl onstage, symbolically representing their ongoing journey together, which began in utero in the "salt bath" of their mother’s womb.

The Caesar Twins have played throughout Europe and in Australia. Their appearances in Great Britain have included the Royal Variety Show, Edinburgh Festival Fringe, London’s Comedy Theatre, and Brighton Festival Fringe. Until spring 2009, they will perform during a Jamie Oliver theatre/meal show in Frankfurt, Germany.

== Personal life ==
The brothers are 1.63 m (5 feet 4 inches) tall, with blond hair. They have twin tattoos, of a puma, encircling one biceps, with Pablo’s on his right arm and Pierre’s on his left to form mirror images in their act. They make a point of dressing identically down to the last detail.
