= Flotsam (disambiguation) =

Flotsam is goods from a sunken vessel that have floated to the surface of the sea, or any floating cargo that is cast overboard.

Flotsam may also refer to:

- Flotsam Moraines, moraines in Antarctica
- Flotsam (David Wiesner book), a children's book by David Wiesner
- Flotsam (novel), a 1939 novel by Erich Maria Remarque
- Flotsam (film), a 2015 Philippine romance film
- Flotsam (video game), a survival simulation video game
- Flotsam Island, a place in the Monkey Island series of graphical adventures

== See also ==
- Flotsam and Jetsam (disambiguation)
