= Dream Street (musical) =

Dream Street was a musical that ran in Las Vegas from 1983 through 1987. Produced by Nancy and Ronnie Horowitz, conceived and written by Mark Donnelly, and choreographed and directed by Steve Merritt, Dream Street was a "compilation" musical, made up of well-known songs strung together with a simple narrative. It dealt with the longings and dreams of a group of children whose neighborhood was being gentrified and who were forced to move out.

The show was originally staged at the Dunes, where it ran for three years. It then moved to the Desert Inn, where it ran for another two years. In 1984, the show won the Eppie award for "Best Show of the Year". After its run in Vegas, the show briefly toured America, performing in such cities as Dallas, Chicago and St. Louis, ending with a run at Harrah's Atlantic City.

Merritt and Donnelly became well known in Las Vegas after Donnelly was nicknamed "The Eyes of Dream Street" by the Las Vegas Sun and a photo of his eyes was plastered on newspapers and billboards all over town. Merritt, whose athletic choreography was unusual for audiences who were used to the "walking about" dancing popular in Vegas shows of the time, went on to choreograph many other shows, including the 1989 Academy Awards Show.

Dream Street owed at least part of its success to its cast, including Forrest Gardner, George Solomon, Monica Pege, Jeffrey Thomas, David Dash, Tony Kishman and Scherrie Payne (of The Supremes). The show was also home to many gifted young dancers, including Michael Fullington, Jerry Evans, Christine Scadina, Lezlie Mogell, Charles McGowan and Macarena Gandarillas, who made the most of Merritt's tough, gritty style.

== See also ==
- Chippendales#History – Merritt and Donnelly choreographed and wrote Chippendales shows
