= Dennis Spicer =

British ventriloquist

Dennis George Spicer (13 January 1935–16 November 1964) was a British ventriloquist who appeared on British television, and in variety in its twilight years.

He was born at Hillingdon County Hospital in Middlesex but he grew up mainly in Coventry. He started ventriloquism at the age of eight and had his first booking aged ten. He worked the clubs and cabaret circuit with his dummies: mainly James Green and Maxwell Monkey, but also Sexy Rexy the Wolf, Puppy Doll the Poodle, Rikki Tikki the Tiger, the Ugly Duckling and Russian Bear. Eventually he began appearing on British television, the first time in 1955. He was also well known in America, with five performances on the Ed Sullivan Show between 1962 and 1964. He appeared on the Royal Variety Performance on 2 November 1964 with a corgi as a dummy and Kenny Baker as a vent dummy which comes to life.

He died in his Reliant Sabre 6 sports car on the A1, near RAF Wittering, near Stamford, Lincolnshire, on 16 November 1964. Although the vehicle was a write off his dummy, James Green, which was also with him in the back of the car, remained unscathed. He left a wife, June, and a son, Robin. The Queen sent a tribute to the funeral.
