= List of British big band leaders =

This is a list of British big band leaders (rather than British dance band leaders).

== A ==
- Alyn Ainsworth (BBC Northern Dance Orchestra)
- John Arthy (Pasadena Roof Orchestra)
- Bill Ashton (National Youth Jazz Orchestra)

== B ==
- Kenny Baker
- Chris Barber
- Ivy Benson
- Tito Burns

== C ==
- Phil Collins (The Phil Collins Big Band)
- Laurence Cottle (Laurence Cottle Big Band)
- Ben Cottrell (Beats & Pieces Big Band)

== D ==
- Joe Daniels
- John Dankworth
- Chris Dean (Syd Lawrence Orchestra)
- Eric Delaney

== E ==
- Ray Ellington

== F ==
- Greg Francis (The New Squadronaires Orchestra)

== G ==
- Michael Garrick
- Calum Gourlay

== H ==
- Tubby Hayes
- Ted Heath
- Jools Holland (Jools Holland's Rhythm and Blues Orchestra)
- Jack Hylton (The Jack Hylton Orchestra)

== J ==
- Jack Jackson
- Laurie Johnson

== K ==
- Basil Kirchin

== L ==
- Syd Lawrence
- Vic Lewis
- Joe Loss
- Don Lusher (The Don Lusher Big Band)

== M ==
- Ken Mackintosh

== N ==
- Ray Noble (The Ray Noble Orchestra)

== P ==
- Jack Parnell
- Harry Parry

== R ==
- Edmundo Ros
- Harry Roy (Harry Roy & his Band)

== S ==
- Cyril Stapleton (BBC Show Band)

== T ==
- Billy Ternent
- Stan Tracey

== W ==
- Don Weller
- John Wilson (John Wilson Orchestra)
- Eric Winstone
