= Billy Dainty =

British comedian (1927–1986)

- Born: William Hooper Frank John Dainty; 22 February 1927; Dudley, Worcestershire, England
- Died: 19 November 1986 (aged 59); Godalming, Surrey, England
- Occupation: Comedian
- Children: 1

William Hooper Frank John Dainty (22 February 1927 – 19 November 1986) was a British comedian, dancer, physical comedian and pantomime and television star.

== Early life ==
Dainty was born in Wolverhampton Street, Dudley, Worcestershire. His father kept a shop at the front of the family home. He made his stage debut as the only boy dancer in a troupe of girls. Later, his family moved to London, where he took tap-dancing lessons from the American-born hoofer Buddy Bradley. He then won a scholarship to the Royal Academy of Dramatic Art where he trained as a comedian. From childhood he had the ambition to be a professional dancer, but he became well known for the funny walks which formed part of his well-loved comedy act.

== Career ==
In 1942 at the age of 15, he made his stage debut in the pantomime Mother Goose, starring Norman Evans and Patricia Burke, where he played the back end of a dancing pantomime donkey called "Asbestos". His next part was as a chorus boy in Strike a New Note at the Prince of Wales Theatre, with Sid Field and Jerry Desmonde, along with the newly formed pairing of Morecambe and Wise.

Called up for national service in 1945, he toured the Far East with the Stars in Battledress for two years. His first work after the war was in a show called Gaytime in Torquay. He spent the next two decades in variety theatre, before getting his TV break on Sunday Night at the London Palladium in the late 1950s.

After appearing in over a dozen pantomimes, often in unremarkable or unfulfilling roles, Dainty was finally persuaded, in 1964, to play the pantomime dame opposite Harry Worth's Old King Cole at the Bristol Hippodrome, where he was hailed a huge success. He also played the dame at the London Palladium in Dick Whittington with the then rising star Tommy Steele. He was proclaimed as "one of the last of the genuine music-hall performers" and as "one of the outstanding artists of his generation".

In 1975, he had his own Thames Television series Billy Dainty, Esq. Between 1975 and 1980 he starred with Rod Hull and Emu, in Emu's Broadcasting Company on BBC1 in which he would often appear as the character the Duchess of Gladstone, a send-up of Queen Elizabeth II. Dainty also had a large following of radio listeners, who tuned-in to his shows, including Stick a Geranium in Your Hat.

On 14 January 1979, Dainty taped a guest spot on Star Turn, a BBC children's programme, on which one of the other guests was Kenneth Williams. In that day's entry in The Kenneth Williams Diaries, Williams quotes scriptwriter John Law describing Dainty as "a terrible provincial comic" (although Williams personally liked him). After reading Dainty's obituary in the newspaper, Williams said: "It caused quite a pang! He was such a delight. A warm and kind-hearted man with humour and an extraordinary gift for the delicate and the deft touch in comedy".

Throughout this time, his pantomime career blossomed. But halfway through the next decade he had to pull out of Aladdin in Nottingham because of poor health.

=== Repertoire ===
Dainty's repertoire of silly walks was unrivalled at the time. He could travel down the stage on his left foot, with his right leg raised throughout. He was also known for his impersonations of fellow stars, including parodies of Shirley Bassey, Fred Astaire and a ballet dancer, whom he called Rudolph Nearenough, based loosely on Rudolph Nureyev. He embodied the authentic, original and exuberant spirit of the old style music hall tradition; the theatre was his domain – although he also successfully moved into television. He was notably successful in Royal Variety shows and was reputed to be a particular favourite of Queen Elizabeth the Queen Mother. Although he was described as looking like a 'plumber's mate', he was in fact an extraordinarily skilled dancer; his nimble footwork and bursts of physical activity always surprised and delighted his audience.

== Death ==
He died on 19 November 1986, aged 59, of prostate cancer at his home Cobblers in Godalming, Surrey.

== Personal life ==
Dainty was married and had one son, Laurence. The family had lived at 'Gaytime', Thatcher Avenue, Torquay, and 'High Hopes', at Ruislip, before moving to Godalming.
