= Topsy Chapman =

American musician (1947–2022)

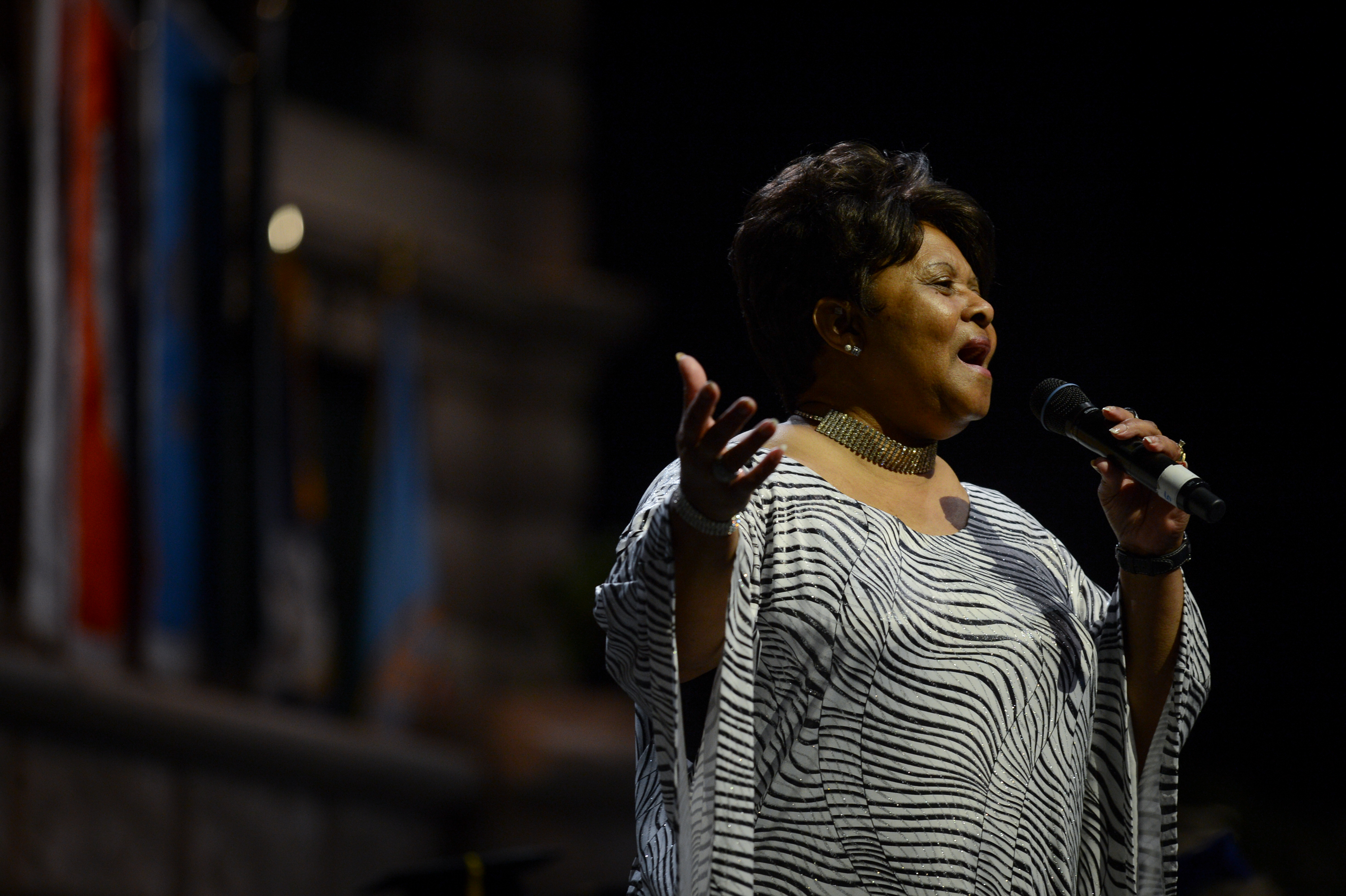
Chapman performing in 2013

Topsy Chapman (1947–2022) was a Jazz and Gospel musician from New Orleans, Louisiana.

== Early life ==
Chapman was born in Kentwood, Louisiana. She sang and played piano at the age of 3 and was considered a musical prodigy. By the age of 6 or 7, she was earning money performing in churches.

== Career ==
Chapman moved to New Orleans when she was 17 where she led her family's Gospel group, The Chapmans. Playwright and director, Vernel Bagneris, recruited the group to appear in his production on 'One Mo' Time'. The show ran at Toulouse Theatre and later premiered Off-Broadway.

Chapman performed with her daughters, Yolanda Robinson and Jolynda Phillips, under the group name Topsy Chapman and Solid Harmony.

Chapman often performed at New Orleans Jazz Fest and was well known in the New Orleans music scene.

In 2013, Chapman appeared in the Academy Award-winning film 12 Years a Slave, performing "Roll Jordan Roll" with Chiwetel Ejiofor.

== Death ==
Chapman died in 2022.
