= Reginald Burston =

English conductor and musical director

Reginald Bradshaw Burston (16 September 1897 – 22 April 1968) was an English conductor and musical director who made his career in light opera, musicals and broadcasting.

Burston spent three years as musical director of the D'Oyly Carte Opera Company's smaller touring ensemble presenting Gilbert and Sullivan in medium-sized towns and cities in the mid-1920s. Thereafter, he worked mostly in the West End, conducting long-running shows by Noël Coward and later, Rodgers and Hammerstein. He was also a frequent broadcaster for the BBC.

== Life and career ==
=== Early years ===
Burston was born in North Malvern, Worcestershire on 16 September 1897, the son of James Bradshaw Burston and his wife, Elizabeth née Griffiths. Burston senior was an amateur musician and introduced his son to the symphonies of Haydn and Beethoven. Burston was educated at the King's School, Worcester and Oxford University, where he graduated Bachelor of Arts. Before becoming a professional musician he wanted to become a clergyman; he studied theology and philosophy, but became attracted by a musical career.

Burston's first appointment was as assistant musical director to Frederick G. Lloyd's repertory company, which presented five light operas, including Les cloches de Corneville, Merrie England, La Cigale and Dorothy. The musical director left early in the tour and Burston took over, "finishing up with five well-known light operas from memory and plenty of valuable experience".

Joining the D'Oyly Carte Opera Company in 1924, Burston served briefly as assistant musical director to Harry Norris with the principal repertory company, before succeeding Percy Rendell as musical director of the D'Oyly Carte "New" company, which toured smaller towns and cities. His repertoire with the company comprised Cox and Box, H.M.S. Pinafore, Patience, Iolanthe, The Mikado, Ruddigore, The Yeomen of the Guard and The Gondoliers. His singers included Marjorie Eyre, Sydney Granville, Martyn Green and Leslie Rands. He retained the post until Rupert D'Oyly Carte disbanded the New company in June 1927.

=== West End and BBC ===
Burston had a variety of jobs in light music between leaving D'Oyly Carte and being recruited by Charles B. Cochran as musical director of Noël Coward's Bitter Sweet. The production ran in London from July 1929 to May 1931. In October 1931 Burston was again engaged by Cochran as musical director of Coward's Cavalcade at the Theatre Royal, Drury Lane; the show ran for 405 performances. He conducted the first night of Coward's Words and Music but then handed over the baton to the composer. For Coward's Conversation Piece in 1934 Burston was musical director throughout the run of 177 performances.

For the BBC, Burston was director of music for the Midland region and conducted the BBC Midland Orchestra in numerous broadcasts in the 1930s. Later, he conducted many broadcasts of Music Parade and Music While You Work.

=== War and post-war ===
During the Second World War Burston was musical director for Wild Rose, a West End revival of Sally, starring Jessie Matthews. When the Rodgers and Hammerstein musicals came to Drury Lane, Burston, by then the musical adviser for the Stoll Theatre Corporation, conducted the London runs of Oklahoma! (from April 1947, 1,543 performances), Carousel (from June 1950, 566 performances), South Pacific (from November 1951, 792 performances), and The King and I (from October 1953, 946 performances). In October 1947, during the run of Oklahoma!, Burston married Sarah Simmons. He was the musical director for the West End production of Bells Are Ringing (270 performances from November 1957). One of his last appearances was conducting the music for the memorial service for W. Macqueen-Pope at St Paul's Covent Garden in July 1960.

Burston retired to Mildenhall in Suffolk, and died in a hospital at Bury St Edmunds on 22 April 1968, aged seventy.

=== Recordings ===
In the recording studio, Burston conducted numbers from Bells are Ringing, Bitter-Sweet, Carousel, Conversation Piece, The King and I, Oklahoma!, South Pacific and Wild Rose.

== Sources ==
- Gaye, Freda, ed. (1967). Who's Who in the Theatre (fourteenth ed.). London: Sir Isaac Pitman and Sons. OCLC 5997224.
- Green, Stanley (1977). Encyclopedia of the Musical Theatre. London: Cassell. ISBN 0-304-29930-8.
- Mander, Raymond; Mitchenson, Joe (1957). Theatrical Companion to Coward. London: Rockliffe. OCLC 903874732.
- Rollins, Cyril; R. John Witts (1962). The D'Oyly Carte Opera Company in Gilbert and Sullivan Operas: A Record of Productions, 1875–1961. London: Michael Joseph. OCLC 504581419.
- Seeley, Robert (1989). London Musical Shows on Record, 1889–1989: A Hundred Years of London's Musical Theatre. Harrow: General Gramophone Publications. ISBN 978-0-90-247030-9.
