= Steve Merritt =

American dancer and choreographer (1945–1993

- Born: Steve Thomas Michaels Ferraro; January 17, 1945; San Jose, California, U.S.
- Died: January 26, 1993 (aged 48); Los Angeles, California, U.S.
- Other name: Steve Thomas Merritt
- Occupations: Choreographer; Dancer
- Years active: mid-1960s – late-1980s
- Notable work: Dream Street; 61st Academy Awards opening number

Steve Thomas Merritt (January 17, 1945 – January 26, 1993) was an American dancer and choreographer.

Together with Nancy and Ronnie Horowitz and Mark Donnelly, Merritt created the musical Dream Street, which played in Las Vegas from 1983 to 1987. Merritt and Donnelly also conceived the Broadway-style format for the Chippendales show. In 1989, Merritt choreographed the opening number of the 61st Academy Awards presentation.

He was born as Steve Thomas Michael Ferraro in San Jose, California, in 1945. He moved to Los Angeles in the mid-1960s and studied dance under David Winter while working as a dancer on a local television show called The Farmer John Dance Show.

He created the Solid Gold Dancers and performed on Casey Kasem's weekly Top Forty Countdown television show.

== Death ==
Merritt died of AIDS in 1993 at age 48 leaving his mother, father, a brother, a sister, a half-brother and a half-sister.
