= Syd Lawrence =

English bandleader (1923–1998)

- Born: Sidney George Lawrence; 26 June 1923; Shotton, Flintshire, Wales
- Died: 5 May 1998 (aged 74) Manchester, England

Sydney George Lawrence (born Sidney George Lawrence; 26 June 1923 – 5 May 1998) was a British bandleader, who became famous in the UK for his orchestra's Big Band sound, which drew on the 1940s style of music of Glenn Miller and Count Basie, amongst others.

== Career ==
Born in Wilmslow, Cheshire, England, in 1923, Lawrence was a talented trumpet player during World War II. He wrote and arranged music. He was based in Cairo during the war years, playing and arranging for the RAF service bands. After he left the armed forces, he played with some of the leading British dance bands of the 1940s, finally being invited to join the BBC Northern Dance Orchestra in 1953. He stayed with this band for sixteen years playing alongside fellow trumpet player Stan Hibbert.

In 1967, Lawrence teamed up with several of his colleagues at the Northern Dance Orchestra to play the music that he was most enthusiastic about, that of Glenn Miller. Early concerts at the Mersey Hotel in Manchester were a success, and larger venues were found to play in as the reputation of his band grew.

Respected comedian Les Dawson discovered the Syd Lawrence Orchestra playing in a bar. He liked them so much, that he wanted them to play backing music for his show Sez Les. He begged Yorkshire Television to give them a chance and they did. And so the Syd Lawrence Orchestra was given their first real break on TV and a regular spot on the comedy show. As the music became more popular, Lawrence and his band started touring around the UK, which they did with great success for many years.

In 1969 he signed with Philips Records and the band's first release was on the low-price Contour label (catalogue no. 6870 550), selling at 10/6d. Titled "Syd Lawrence with the Glenn Miller Sound", and credited to The Syd Lawrence Orchestra, it was recorded at Strawberry Studios on 23 and 25 September 1969. It had ten tracks, all being songs or tunes previously recorded by Miller between 1939 and 1942; some being slightly extended or rearranged. The Orchestra went on to record about fifteen long playing albums, usually at the Strawberry Recording Studios in Stockport, along with radio and television appearances on variety shows. He appeared with his band on 3-2-1 and also occasionally was a vocalist.

Lawrence retired from touring in 1994 and died of an aneurysm in 1998. Following his death, the Syd Lawrence Band continued on and still tours. The orchestra was led by Bryan Pendleton, and is currently led by Chris Dean. In 2011 it was voted the Best Big Band in the Land for the 11th consecutive year.
