= Malcolm McEachern =

Australian opera singer (1883–1945)

Walter Malcolm Neil McEachern (1 April 1883 – 17 January 1945) was an Australian bass singer who enjoyed a successful career in the United Kingdom, both as a concert soloist and as one half of the comic musical duo Flotsam and Jetsam.

== Personal life ==
McEachern was born in Albury, New South Wales, the sixth of 13 children of Archibald Hector McEachern and his wife, Rebecca Mary. On 2 February 1916, McEachern married pianist Hazel Hogarth Doyle, who later became his accompanist and provided the musical direction for his career. Hazel came from a musical family: her mother Florence was a pianist and the violinist Bessie Doyle was a sister.

He was a Freemason, and a member of the Savage Club Lodge in London.

== Career and death ==
During World War I, McEachern went on a tour of Australia with the great Australian soprano Nellie Melba. Also in the touring company were Ella Caspers, Ada Crossley and Marie Narelle.

In 1921 McEachern went to England with his wife, where he was hailed as one of the world's best bass vocalists. He was especially acclaimed as an oratorio singer although his voice was equally well suited to the demands of opera; but unlike his finest contemporary rival among English-language basses, Norman Allin, he elected not to pursue a career in that particular art form. McEachern did appear, however, in an array of staged Gilbert and Sullivan Savoy operettas under the batons of the famous conductors Sir Henry Wood and Sir John Barbirolli.

In early 1926, McEachern forged a light-entertainment collaboration with Bentley Collingwood Hilliam, a pianist from Yorkshire. Their act proved to be a great success with British audiences and they became famous as Mr. Flotsam and Mr. Jetsam.

McEachern was diagnosed with cancer of the oesophagus and died after an operation in London on 17 January 1945. His name is commemorated in Australia by McEachern Crescent in the Canberra suburb of Melba.

== Recordings ==
McEachern made a total of 187 studio recordings, including pieces of music from opera, operetta and oratorio as well as a number of popular songs of the day. These records display the impressive depth, power and tonal richness of his voice and the excellence of his technique.

One of his English-language 78-rpm discs, made with his countryman Harold Williams, of "The Gendarmes' Duet" from Jacques Offenbach's Geneviève de Brabant, is considered to be a classic recording. Produced in 1933, it has been re-issued many times since and is available on CD.

In 1983 EMI Records Australia together with The National Library of Australia released 49 of McEachern's recordings as a 3 LP record compilation transferred from 78 rpm pressings manufactured in Australia.

== Bibliographies ==
- B. and F. Mackenzie, Singers of Australia (Melb, 1967); 'Death of Mr. McEachern', Times (London), 18 Jan 1945, p 6; Sydney Morning Herald, 18 Jan 1945; 'Obituary', Times (London), 19 Jan 1945, p 8.
- Print Publication Details: Peter Burgis, 'McEachern, Walter Malcolm Neil (1883–1945)', Australian Dictionary of Biography, Volume 10, Melbourne University Press, 1986, pp 264–265.
