= Royal Variety Performance =

Variety show in the United Kingdom

- Also known as: Royal Command Performance
- Genre: Variety show
- Created by: Royal Variety Charity
- Presented by: See list for presenters
- Starring: See list for acts and performers
- Country of origin: United Kingdom
- Original language: English
- No. of episodes: 97 (1 upcoming) (list of episodes)

Production
- Production locations: Various (historically); Royal Albert Hall (since 2021)
- Production companies: BBC (even years, 1960–2010); Associated Television (odd years, 1961–1979); London Weekend Television (odd years, 1981–2003); Granada Productions (odd years, 2005–2009); ITV Studios (all years, 2011–present)

Original release
- Network: BBC Radio (Note: Originally unbroadcast before 1926, the programme was carried on the BBC National Programme by 1930 and later transferred to the BBC Light Programme in 1945.)
- Release: 27 May 1926 – 28 June 1959
- Network: ITV (Note: ATV from 1960–1981, LWT from 1982–1987, ITV from 1989–present) (1960–present); BBC One (Note: BBC TV in 1962, BBC1 from 1964–1996, BBC One from 1998–2010) (1962–2010)
- Release: 16 May 1960 – present

Related
- Tonight at the London Palladium

The Royal Variety Performance is a televised variety show held annually in the United Kingdom to raise money for the Royal Variety Charity (of which King Charles III is life-patron). It is attended by senior members of the British royal family. The evening's performance is presented as a live variety show, usually from a theatre in London and consists of family entertainment that includes comedy, music, dance, magic and other speciality acts.

The Royal Variety Performance traditionally begins with the entrance of the members of the royal family followed by the singing of the national anthem, "God Save the King", which was also performed by the participating acts as a traditional end to Royal Variety Performances; with the exception of 2020 due to the coronavirus pandemic, as a result of which, "As If We Never Said Goodbye" opened that year's show instead, sung by that year's host, Jason Manford. After each performance, the performer bows twice, one to the audience and then to the Royal Family.

== Background and founding ==
The first performance, on 1 July 1912, was called the Royal Command Performance, and this name has persisted informally for the event. This was held in the Palace Theatre, Shaftesbury Avenue, London, in the presence of King George V and Queen Mary. After correspondence with theatre impresario Sir Edward Moss, the King said he would command a Royal Variety show in his coronation year, 1911, provided the profits went to the Variety Artistes' Benevolent Fund, as the Royal Variety Charity was then known. It was planned to be in the Empire Theatre, Edinburgh, part of the vast Moss Empires group, but the building caught on fire a month before the show. After the death of Moss, Sir Alfred Butt was chosen as the impresario and it was staged in 1912. This was a lavish occasion, and his London Palace Theatre was lavishly decorated, complete with some three million rose petals.

=== Artists, performers and broadcasts ===
Top performers included Vesta Tilley, Sir George Robey, David Devant, Anna Pavlova, Harry Lauder and Cecilia Loftus. The organisers did not invite Marie Lloyd, because of a professional dispute. Her act was deemed too risqué and her three public, unsuccessful marriages were thought to make her unfit to perform in front of royalty. She held a rival performance in a nearby theatre, which she advertised was "by command of the British public". The name of the event was changed to prevent possible royal embarrassment. The Royal Variety Performance became an annual event at the suggestion of King George V from 1921 and from 1926 the British Broadcasting Corporation began to broadcast it on radio.

From 1928 to 1938, the impresario-producer and manager of the London Palladium, George Black, took over the presentation of the Royal Variety Performance. He would also facilitate as compere at the shows. His first production was held on 1 March 1928 at the London Coliseum and from 1930 to 1937 he held the shows at the London Palladium. His 1938 show returned to the London Coliseum. Throughout World War II from 1939 to 1944 no shows were presented. The show resumed in 1945 after the war ended.

From 1960 to 2010, the BBC and ITV broadcast a recorded version of the show, alternating the production between their two main channels, with the BBC producing and televising the 'even years' and ITV televising the 'odd years'. In both 1976 and 1978, the BBC broadcast the show live. The show was staged mainly in a West End theatre. Prior to 1999, only two shows were staged outside London (1955 in Blackpool and 1959 in Manchester), but in 2003, 2005, 2007 and 2009, Royal Varieties were aired on ITV from regional theatres outside London. ITV secured exclusive rights to televise the show in 2011. The show has been frequently staged in the London Palladium theatre, and in the 1950s and 1960s a television show based on the same idea, called Sunday Night at the London Palladium and hosted by many entertainers, including Bruce Forsyth, ran for over 20 years.

A wide range of acts has performed at the Royal Variety Performance, including Laurel and Hardy in 1947, The Beatles in 1963, the Supremes in 1968 and the Blue Man Group in 2005. Max Bygraves and Cliff Richard are two of the most frequent performers, having appeared at least 14 and 13 times each respectively between 1950 and 2008. The Beatles appeared at the 1963 show, when John Lennon delivered the line "For our last number I'd like to ask your help: Will the people in the cheaper seats clap your hands? And the rest of you, if you'll just rattle your jewellery."

The money raised by the Royal Variety Performance provides most of the funding for the Royal Variety Charity (formerly the Entertainment Artistes' Benevolent Fund) and its care-home for retired members of the entertainment profession and their dependents, Brinsworth House.

In 1974, Noele Gordon presented the Royal Variety Performance making her the first female presenter of the show.

== Performances ==
After the first Royal Variety Performance on 1 July 1912 presented by Sir Alfred Butt, it was seven years before the next show, on 28 July 1919 held at the Coliseum Theatre presented this time by Sir Oswald Stoll. The orchestra was conducted by Edward Elgar. In 1921 it moved to the Hippodrome, and was held in November. It was the first time that the Royal Variety Performance became an annual event. In 1923 it moved to the Coliseum Theatre. Then after a gap in 1924, moved to the Alhambra Theatre in February 1925, where it remained in 1926, held on 27 May. It was the first Royal Variety Performance to be broadcast, with the BBC providing live radio coverage.

In 1927 there was another move, this time to the Victoria Palace Theatre, with J. A. Webb the compère. The 1928 show, on 13 December, was held at the Coliseum Theatre. The next show, on 22 May 1930, moved to the London Palladium with George Black and Val Parnell compèring. It was the start of seven successive years at the venue.

In 1935 the Royal Variety Performance was held in the Silver Jubilee year of King George V and Queen Mary. This was the last time King George V attended – he died three months later, in January 1936.

There have been two Royal Scottish Variety Performances, both attended by Queen Elizabeth II, and presented by Howard & Wyndham Ltd in Glasgow's Alhambra Theatre, which Sir Alfred Butt had opened, in 1958 and 1963.

The Children's Royal Variety Performance was devised by entertainer Rod Hull in 1981 and took place in London until 1994 in aid of NSPCC, all attended by Princess Margaret who was president of the NSPCC. The first year's performers included the "Tiswas" team of Lenny Henry, Chris Tarrant and Sally James, pop band Adam and the Ants, former Blue Peter presenters Lesley Judd, John Noakes and Peter Purves (who performed a number from The Wizard of Oz together), magician Paul Daniels as well as Rod Hull himself.

In 1990, A Royal Birthday Gala to celebrate the 90th birthday of Queen Elizabeth the Queen Mother, was staged at the London Palladium on 19 July, replacing the traditional November/December Royal Variety Show that year. In place of the traditional show, a special programme called Thirty Years of the Royal Variety Performance aired on BBC One on 29 December 1990. It was hosted by Bruce Forsyth and took a look back at the BBC's television broadcasts of the programme over 30 years, with clips from the archives. After this variation, from 1991, the traditional variety, show returned.

In 2018 the show was hosted by comedian Greg Davies and performed six months after the marriage of Prince Harry, Duke of Sussex who attended it with his new wife. This year's aftershow party and banquet was held with entertainment from magicians, such as Jay & Joss and popular band, The Masqueraders.

However in 2020, due to the coronavirus pandemic, a virtual version was held, opening with a virtual message from the then Prince of Wales followed by "As If We Never Said Goodbye" sung by that year's host Jason Manford.

The Royal Variety performance of 2023, held in the Royal Albert Hall, was hosted by Bradley Walsh. The headline act was performed by Cher.

== Britain's Got Talent ==
Since 2007, one act of the Royal Variety show has been selected by the British public through the ITV television talent show Britain's Got Talent. A public telephone vote decides the most popular act in each semi-final, which then progresses to the final, along with a second act chosen by the judges. The grand final is then broadcast live and all the acts perform again for the public vote.

=== Winners ===
- 2007: Paul Potts – pop opera tenor
- 2008: George Sampson – street dancer
- 2009: Diversity – street dance group
- 2010: Spelbound – gymnastics squad
- 2011: Jai McDowall – singer
- 2012: Ashleigh and Pudsey – musical canine freestyle
- 2013: Attraction – shadow theatre group
- 2014: Collabro – singing group
- 2015: Jules O'Dwyer & Matisse – musical canine freestyle
- 2016: Richard Jones – magician
- 2017: Tokio Myers – pianist
- 2018: Lee Ridley (Lost Voice Guy) – comedian
- 2019: Colin Thackery – singer
- 2020: Jon Courtenay – comical singer and pianist
- 2022: Axel Blake – comedian
- 2023: Viggo Venn – comedian
- 2024: Sydnie Christmas – singer
- 2025: Harry Moulding – Magician
- 2026: The Hawkstone Farmers Choir - Choir

== Venues ==
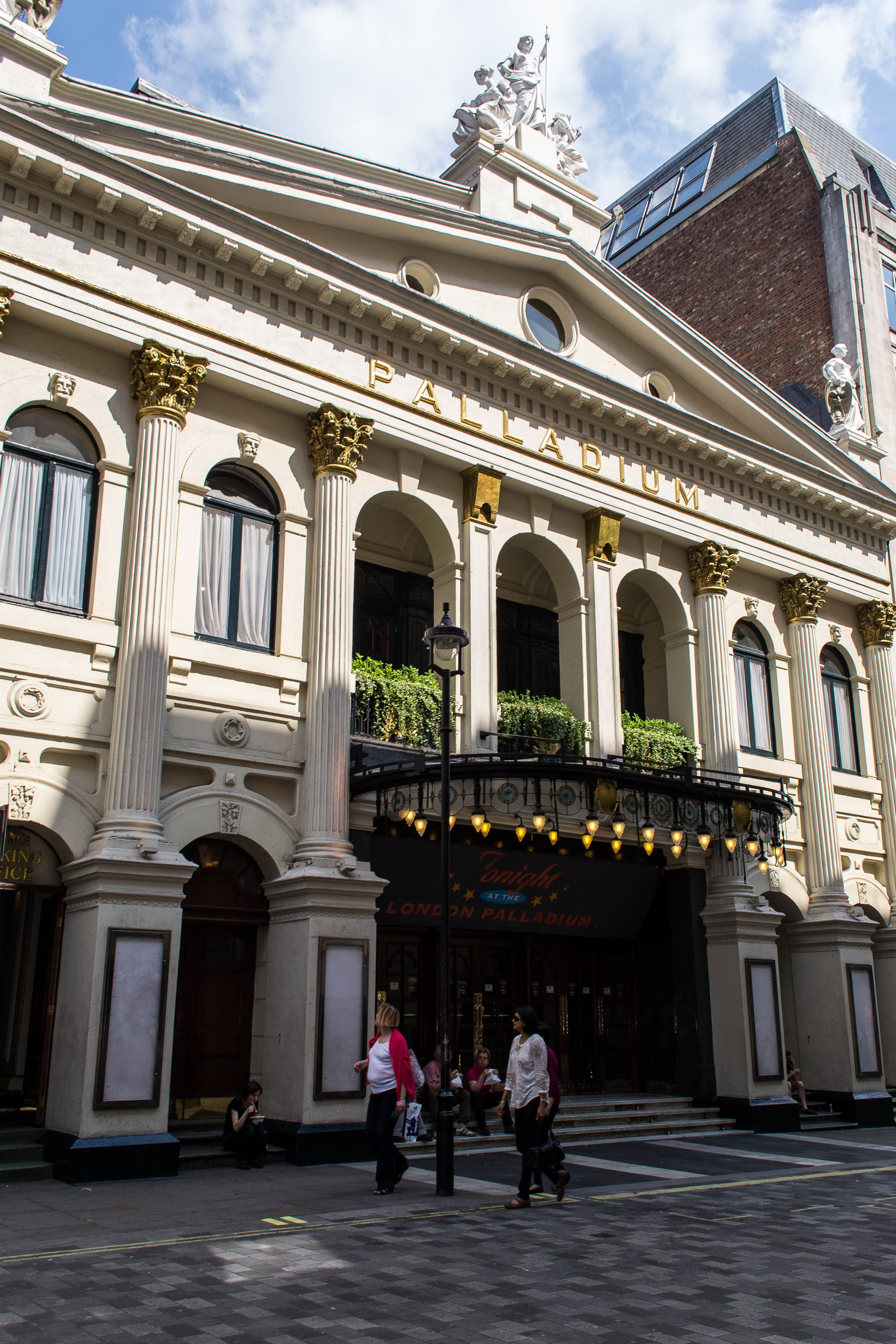
The London Palladium, where the performance has most often been held.

There have been a total of 17 theatres that have staged the 93 Royal Variety Performances, and the 1912 Royal Command Performance. Out of the total of 93 shows, 75 have been in London theatres and seven in other cities and towns.

Note: Where no town or city is noted in the theatre column in the following table, the venue is situated in London.

Theatre	No.	Years
London Palladium	43	1930–1937, 1946–1948, 1950, 1952, 1954, 1957, 1962, 1964–1978, 1980, 1987–1990, 2008, 2010, 2013–2014, 2017–2019
London Coliseum	10	1919, 1923, 1928, 1938, 1945, 1949, 1953, 1958, 2004, 2006
Royal Albert Hall	8	2012, 2015, 2021–2026
Theatre Royal, Drury Lane	7	1979, 1981–1983, 1985–1986, 1991
Dominion Theatre	7	1992–1996, 2000–2001
Victoria Palace Theatre	6	1927, 1951, 1955, 1960, 1984, 1997
Opera House Theatre, Blackpool	3	1955, 2009, 2020
Hippodrome, London	2	1921–1922
Alhambra Theatre	2	1925–1926
Prince of Wales Theatre	2	1961, 1963
Hammersmith Apollo	2	2002, 2016
Palace Theatre, London	1	1912
Palace Theatre, Manchester	1	1959
Lyceum Theatre	1	1998
Birmingham Hippodrome	1	1999
Edinburgh Festival Theatre	1	2003
Wales Millennium Centre, Cardiff	1	2005
Liverpool Empire Theatre	1	2007
The Lowry, Salford Quays, Salford	1	2011

== Royal Family attendance ==
A total of 17 members of the royal family have attended the 86 Royal Variety Performances, and the 1912 Royal Command Performance.

Name	No.	Years
Queen Elizabeth II (Note: Attended four times as Princess Elizabeth)	39	1945–47, 1949, 1952–58, 1960, 1962, 1964–65, 1967, 1969–71, 1973, 1975, 1977, 1979, 1981, 1983, 1985, 1987, 1989–90, 1993, 1995, 1997, 1999, 2001, 2003, 2005, 2007, 2009, 2012
Queen Elizabeth the Queen Mother (Note: Attended as Queen Elizabeth between 1937 and 1951 and as The Queen Mother from 1959 onward)	26	1937–38, 1945–51, 1959, 1961, 1963, 1966, 1968, 1970, 1972, 1974, 1976, 1978, 1980, 1982, 1984, 1986, 1988, 1990–91
Prince Philip, Duke of Edinburgh	26	1947, 1953–55, 1957–58, 1960, 1962, 1965, 1967, 1969–70, 1973, 1975, 1977, 1979, 1985, 1987, 1989–90, 1993, 1997, 2003, 2005, 2007, 2009, 2012
King Charles III (Note: Attended 16 times as Prince Charles)	18	1968, 1977, 1984, 1992, 1994, 1996, 1998, 2000, 2002, 2004, 2006, 2008, 2010, 2013, 2016, 2020, (Note: Virtual message) 2024, (Note: Queen Camilla originally planned to join the King but cancelled due to illness) 2026
King George V	15	1912, 1919, 1921–23, 1925–28, 1930–35
Queen Mary	15	1912, 1919, 1921–23, 1925–28, 1930–35
King George VI	8	1937–38, 1945–50
Princess Margaret, Countess of Snowdon	7	1949, 1951, 1963, 1968, 1970, 1972, 1988, 1990
William, Prince of Wales	6	2014, 2017, 2019, 2021, 2023, 2025
Catherine, Princess of Wales	6	2014, 2017, 2019, 2021, 2023, 2025
Queen Camilla (Note: Attended five times as Camilla, Duchess of Cornwall)	6	2006, 2008, 2010, 2013, 2016, 2026
Anne, Princess Royal	3	1968, 1972, 2011
Prince Harry, Duke of Sussex	2	2015, 2018
Diana, Princess of Wales	2	1984, 1992
Antony Armstrong-Jones, Earl of Snowdon	2	1966, 1968
Lady Sarah Armstrong-Jones	1	1984
Prince Edward, Duke of Edinburgh	1	2022
Sophie, Duchess of Edinburgh	1	2022
Meghan, Duchess of Sussex	1	2018
Sarah Ferguson (Note: Attended as Duchess of York)	1	1986
Queen Maud of Norway	1	1922
Victoria, Crown Princess of Sweden	1	2023
Prince Daniel, Duke of Västergötland	1	2023

== Television coverage ==
The performance is broadcast on television throughout the world and is considered by many to be a tradition of the Christmas and New Year holiday season, particularly within the 56 countries of the Commonwealth of Nations. For example, in Norway the programme is broadcast on NRK following the chimes of midnight each New Year's Eve with Norwegian subtitles and in New Zealand, Australia, South Africa, the Caribbean Islands and the Bahamas it is broadcast during the afternoon of Christmas Day, every year. In Canada, it has aired on CBC variously on Boxing Day, New Year's Eve or New Year's Day.

ITV is contracted by the Royal Variety Charity for TV production and in the UK is the sole broadcaster, having shared that responsibility with the BBC between 1960 and 2010.

=== Ratings ===
In the 1960s, the televised edition of the show was the number one rated show for the entire year in the UK in 1960–1963, 1965, and 1967–1968, with the show ranked 6th in 1964, 3rd in 1966, and 2nd in 1969.

In the 1970s, the show topped the annual rankings in 1975 and ranked 8th in 1970, 4th in 1971, 9th in 1976 and 3rd in 1977.

Ratings sourced from BARB.

Airdate	Viewers (millions)	Broadcaster	Overnight share
20 December 1998	11.24	BBC One	—N/a
4 December 1999	10.60	ITV	41.0%
17 December 2000	7.92	BBC One	—N/a
28 November 2001	11.55	ITV	47.0%
15 December 2002	8.19	BBC One	30.9%
26 November 2003	8.56	ITV	36.8%
15 December 2004	6.60	BBC One	31.0%
11 December 2005	9.82	ITV	36.8%
12 December 2006	7.98	BBC One	33.7%
9 December 2007	7.78	ITV	27.2%
17 December 2008	7.75	BBC One	31.7%
16 December 2009	9.56	ITV	37.4%
16 December 2010	8.90	BBC One	33.0%
14 December 2011	7.61 (Note: 6.75 million on ITV, 564,000 on ITV HD and 293,000 on ITV +1)	ITV	29.2%
3 December 2012	9.24 (Note: 8.05 million on ITV, 767,000 on ITV HD and 422,000 on ITV +1)	ITV	33.7%
9 December 2013	8.30 (Note: 7.07 million on ITV, 832,000 on ITV HD and 398,000 on ITV +1)	ITV	31.3%
8 December 2014	7.64 (Note: 6.31 million on ITV, 919,000 on ITV HD and 413,000 on ITV +1)	ITV	28.7%
8 December 2015	4.94	ITV	24.3%
13 December 2016	5.13	ITV	22.0%
19 December 2017	4.86	ITV	22.1%
11 December 2018	5.01	ITV	21.7%
10 December 2019	5.06	ITV	—N/a
8 December 2020	4.27	ITV	—N/a
19 December 2021	4.74	ITV	—N/a
20 December 2022	3.60	ITV	—N/a
17 December 2023	4.05	ITV	—N/a
15 December 2024	3.49	ITV	—N/a
21 December 2025	4.08	ITV	—N/a

== See also ==
- Royal Command Performance
- List of Royal Variety Performances
