= Mr. Flotsam and Mr. Jetsam =

Anglo-Australian comedy duo (1920s–1930s)

Flotsam and Jetsam
- Origin: England; Australia
- Genres: Comic songs
- Years active: 1920s–1930s
- Past members: Bentley Collingwood Hilliam; Malcolm McEachern

Mr. Flotsam and Mr. Jetsam were an Anglo-Australian musical comedy duo of the 1920s and 1930s. Mr. Flotsam's real name was Bentley Collingwood Hilliam (1890–1968) and Mr. Jetsam's real name was Malcolm McEachern (1883–1945). Hilliam wrote most of their songs, played the piano and sang in a light, high tenor voice. By contrast, McEachern had one of the deepest bass voices on record. Their material consisted of comic songs with rapid-fire delivery and songs with mild social commentary, as well as sentimental songs.

They are sometimes considered a precursor of Flanders and Swann.

== Songs in their repertoire ==
- "Simon the Bootlegger"
- "The Alsatian and the Pekinese"
- "The Changing of the Guard"
- "Is 'E an Aussie"
- "I Want to be a Military Man"
- "King Canute"
- "Little Betty Bouncer"
- "What's the Matter With Rachmaninoff?"
- "The spooning of the knife and fork"

The song "Is 'E an Aussie" features during the end credits for the 2013 film The Purge.

McEachern, though, appears without Hilliam as Abdullah in the 1934 film Chu Chin Chow where his deep voice is heard to great effect.
