= Dickenson Road Studios =

Former church and BBC television studio in Manchester, England

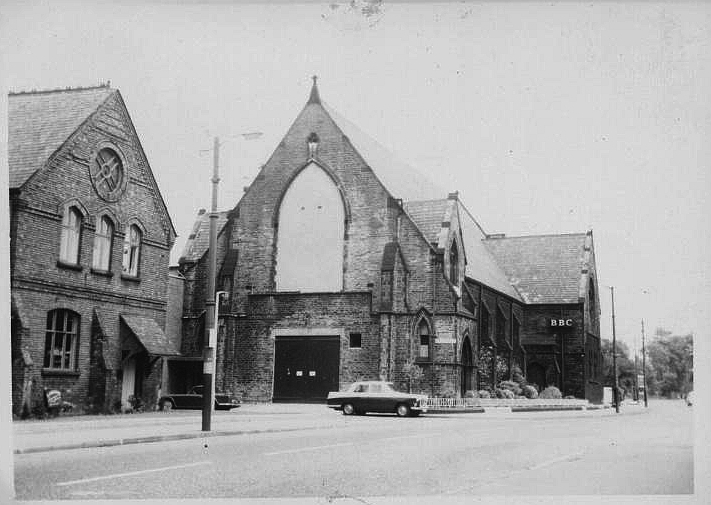
- BBC Dickenson Road Studios, c. 1965

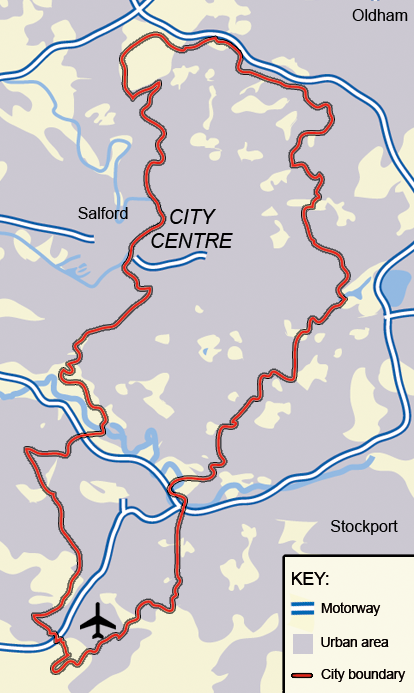
- Location within Greater Manchester Location within Manchester
- Former names: Dickenson Rd Wesleyan Methodist Church

General information
- Status: Demolished
- Type: Converted church/film and television studio
- Architectural style: Gothic Revival
- Location: Dickenson Road, Rusholme, Manchester, UK
- Coordinates: 53.4524°N 2.2197°W
- Construction started: 1862
- Opened: 1862 Church opened; 1947 converted to film studio
- Closed: 1975
- Demolished: 1975
- Owner: Wesleyan Methodist Church (1862–1937); Mancunian Films (1947–1954); BBC (1954–1975)

Design and construction
- Architects: William Haley & Son
- Known for: Broadcast of the first episodes of Top of the Pops

Dickenson Road Studios was a film and television studio in Rusholme, Manchester, in north-west England. It was originally set up in 1947 in a former Wesleyan Methodist chapel by the film production company Mancunian Films and was acquired by BBC Television in 1954. The studio was used for early editions of the music chart show Top of the Pops between 1964 and 1966.

The studio closed in 1975, when the BBC moved to New Broadcasting House on Oxford Road and the building was demolished.

== History ==
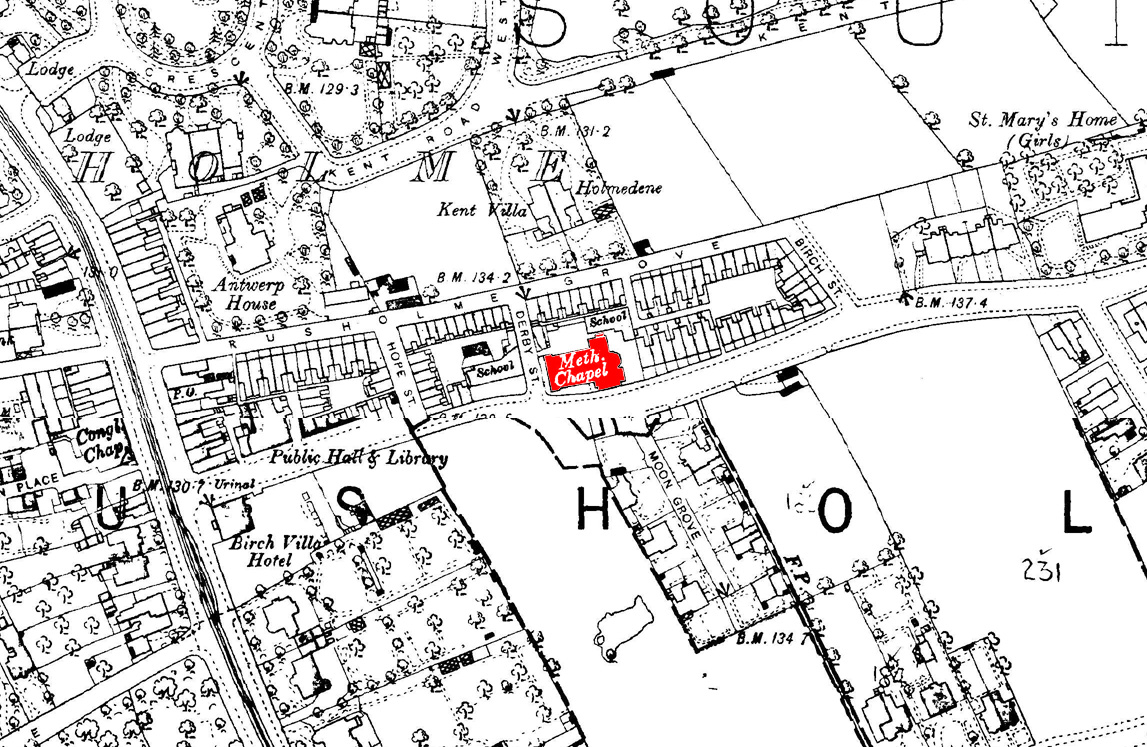
Dickenson Road Methodist chapel on an 1899 map

Dickenson Road Wesleyan Methodist Church was built in 1862 at a cost of £4,000, designed in a Geometric Decorated Gothic Revival style by the Manchester architects William Haley & Son. The gable-fronted building had a high-pitched roof surmounted with a decorated stone cross. It was divided into a nave and transepts. At the eastern end was an apse with three stained-glass windows, and there were future plans to extend the building further. The exterior was faced in Pierrepoint and Hollington stone.

The Wesleyan Methodists were a branch of the Nonconformist Christian denominations that developed from the religious teachings of John Wesley. In 1932, the Wesleyans merged with the Primitive Methodist and the United Methodist Churches to form the Methodist Church of Great Britain. As a result of this merger, many churches and chapels closed, and Dickenson Road Church closed to worship in 1937.

=== Mancunian Films ===
In the 1930s, British film producer John E. Blakeley was expanding his film production business, Blakeley's Productions Ltd. Despite the low production values of filming in unsatisfactory rented spaces, the company's film releases had helped to launch the career of the variety entertainer George Formby. Blakeley's films relaunched his company as Mancunian Films.

Focussing on the northern market, Blakeley decided to establish his own studio in Manchester. In 1947, he purchased the disused church on Dickenson Road and converted the building into a two-stage film studio at a cost of £70,000, creating the first British film studio outside south-east England. The studio received funding from the National Film Finance Corporation (NFFC), which provided grants to support independent British studios.

Dickenson Road Studios were officially opened in 1947 at a ceremony attended by "John E." and Mancunian screen stars George Formby, Frank Randle, Norman Evans, Dan Young and Sandy Powell. The new production operation earned the nickname "the Hollywood of the North", or alternatively "Jollywood", on account of its output of comedy films. Critics of Mancunian's productions dubbed the studio the "Corn Exchange", a humorous reference to the Corn Exchange in Manchester ("corn" being a slang term for unoriginal, poor-quality humour).

The first production there was Cup-tie Honeymoon in 1948, starring Sandy Powell and featuring future Coronation Street stars Pat Phoenix and Bernard Youens. It was filmed at the Dickenson Road Studios, with location filming taking place at Maine Road football stadium. Over the next six years, the films featured northern favourites Frank Randle, Josef Locke, Diana Dors and Jimmy Clitheroe. The studio, often worked on shoestring budgets, was profitable, but Blakely decided to retire when he reached 65. Mancunian Films continued under Blakeley's son Tom for many years, providing facilities for Hammer Horror productions (Hell Is a City, 1960) and making a number of B-movies.

Mancunian Films productions after 1948 included:

- Cup-tie Honeymoon (1948)
- International Circus Review (1948)
- Holidays with Pay (1948)
- Showground of the North (1948)
- Somewhere in Politics (1948)
- What a Carry On (1949)
- School for Randle (1949)
- Over the Garden Wall (1950)
- Let's Have a Murder (1950)
- Love's a Luxury (1952)
- Those People Next Door (1952)
- It's a Grand Life (1953)

=== BBC Television ===
Artists who made their Top of the Pops debuts at Dickenson Road Studios

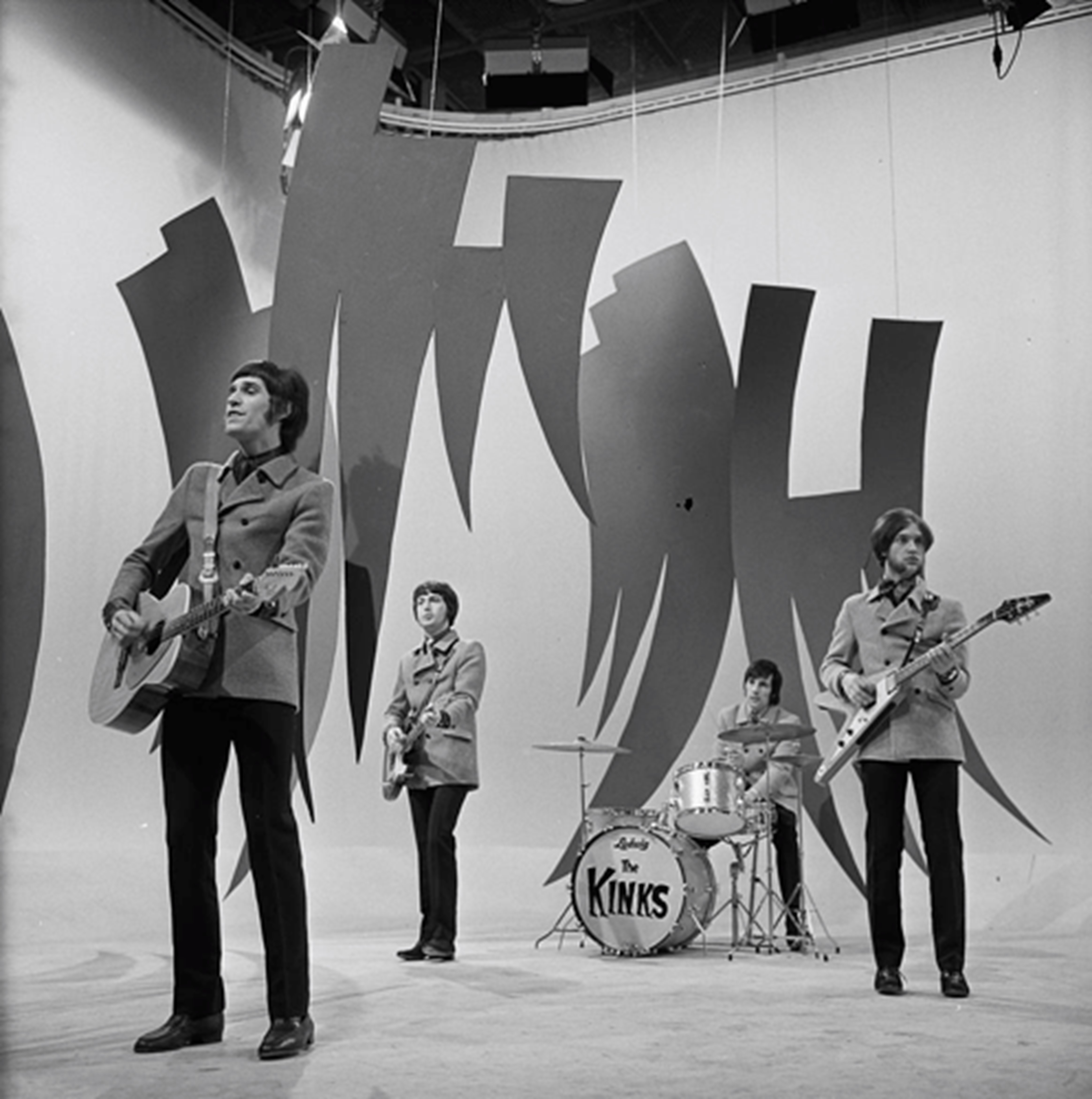
The Kinks (pictured playing on Dutch TV, 1967)

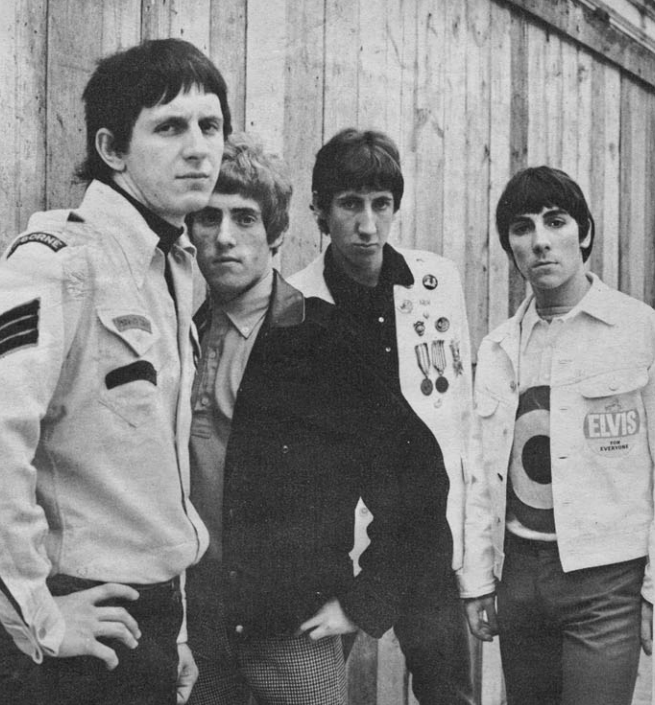
The Who (1965 publicity photo)

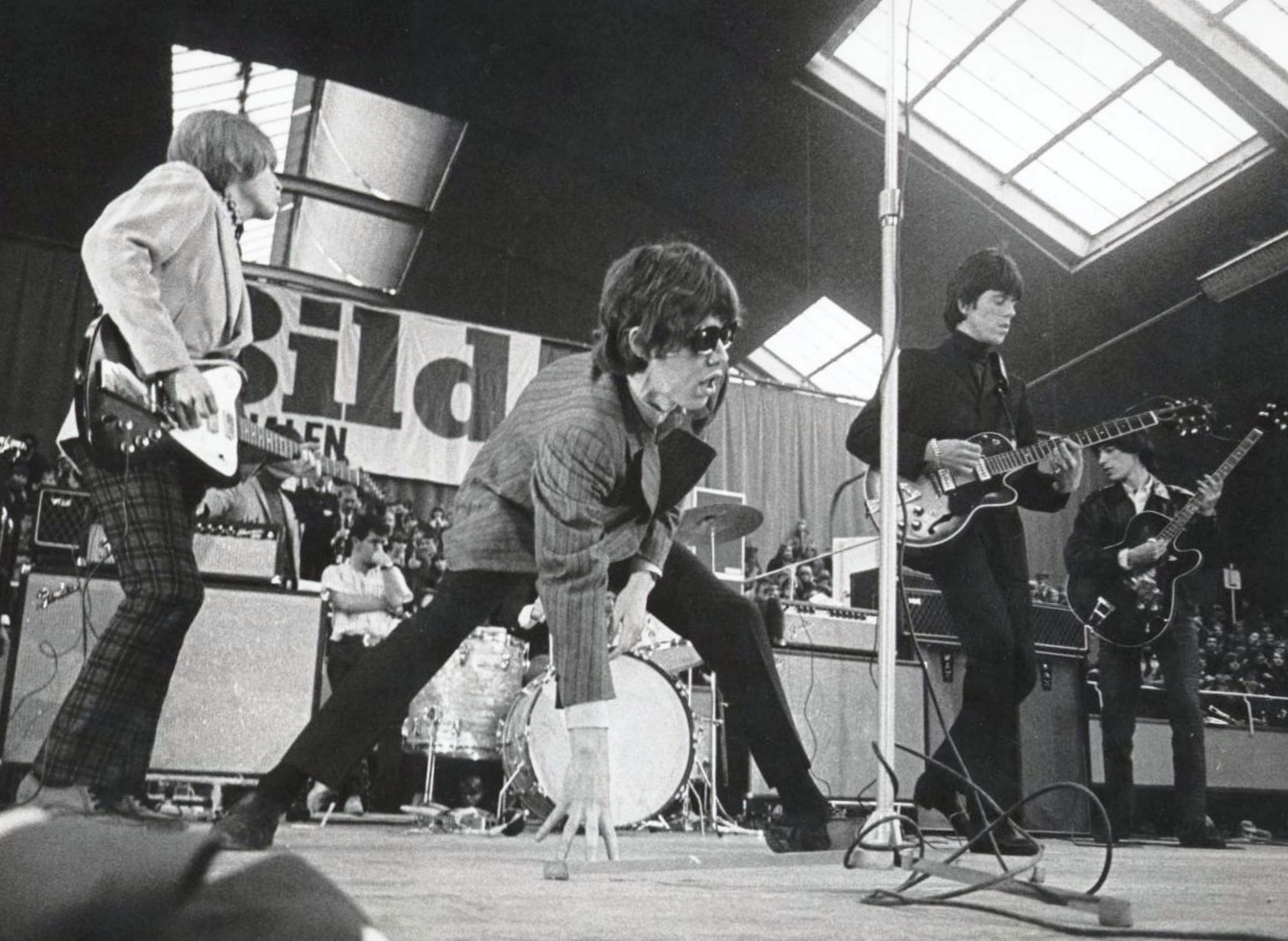
The Rolling Stones (pictured playing live in Sweden in 1966)

In the 1950s the growing reach of television affected the size of cinema audiences, and as the mass media market evolved, numerous film studios were taken over by emerging television broadcasters. In London, the BBC acquired Lime Grove Studios from Gainsborough Pictures in 1949 and Ealing Studios in 1955. Dickenson Road Studios was bought from Mancunian by the BBC in 1954, and it became the first regional BBC Television studio outside London. Programmes made by the BBC at the studios included series starring comedian Harry Worth and variety programmes, and the studio became the production headquarters for BBC television drama in the North, being used for the production of early plays by television writers such as Alan Plater. The studio possessed no recording facilities; the pictures were fed by landline down to London for recording and were then played back for checking at the studio.

The first episode of the pop music television show Top of the Pops was broadcast from Dickenson Road Studio on 1 January 1964, presented by Jimmy Savile and Alan Freeman and produced by Johnnie Stewart. The programme opened with the Rolling Stones performing "I Wanna Be Your Man", and featured Dusty Springfield singing "I Only Want to Be with You" and the Hollies performing "Stay". It concluded with a recording of "I Want to Hold Your Hand" by the Beatles, played over a montage of film clips. The programme was broadcast from Studio A at Dickenson Road for three years, hosted by presenters such as Savile, Freeman, Pete Murray and David Jacobs. It also featured Samantha Juste as the "disc girl", the female DJ who played the week's hit records on a record turntable live on-air. Early Top of the Pops episodes were broadcast live, and to begin with, performers mimed to their own records. This practice was not always successful; when the Swinging Blue Jeans were broadcast miming to their version of "Hippy Hippy Shake" in 1964, the record was played at the wrong speed, disrupting the performance. (Note: After later intervention by the Musicians' Union, songs were either performed live accompanied by an orchestra or to a specially recorded backing track.)

During the time the programme was broadcast from Dickenson Road Studios, many popular acts performed there; the Kinks made their Top of the Pops debut at Dickenson Road on 19 August 1964 with "You Really Got Me"; the Who debuted on 11 March 1965 with "I Can't Explain"; the Merseybeats, Gerry and the Pacemakers, Peter and Gordon, the Fourmost, the Small Faces, Ken Dodd, Val Doonican, Them, Cliff Richard and the Animals were also among the early acts to appear there. Due to the limitations of the building, the Beatles did not appear in person on the show; their performances were pre-recorded at the Riverside Studios in London. (Note: The Beatles' only live appearance on Top of the Pops was at BBC Television Centre on 16 June 1966, when they performed "Paperback Writer" and "Rain".) No archive recordings remain in existence of the first broadcasts from Dickenson Road, it is not known if the earliest episodes were ever recorded. However, the photographer Harry Goodwin (born in Fallowfield, Manchester) took many photographs of stars who performed at Dickenson Road Studios in the 1960s, including shots of James Brown and Stevie Wonder. Goodwin's weekly fee of £30 was considered very low; Mick Jagger of the Rolling Stones advised him to demand more, but as a compromise, Johnnie Stewart gave Goodwin a weekly mention on the programme's closing credits.

Performers and production staff have remarked on the experience of hosting the leading pop celebrities of the day at such an unglamorous location as a former church in the North. The then production secretary of Top of the Pops, Frances Line, recalled the unusual sight of television cameras moving up and down the interior of an old church. Performers on the show often had to make a long journey from London by British Rail, but as the programme gained viewers, BBC budgets extended to flying the stars from Heathrow Airport. At the end of the live broadcast, performers would then take taxis to catch the evening flight back to London. Ground staff at Manchester Airport grew accustomed to dealing with pop stars checking in late.

Bobby Elliott, drummer with the Hollies, remembered that he travelled north with his group in a van. His impression of Dickenson Road Studios was: "Quite cosy. Great little canteen with friendly ladies who served tea in proper cups on saucers." The crowded canteen was usually packed with stars, which sometimes resulted in conflict. After a dinner lady asked for autographs from members of the Swinging Blue Jeans, the band became embroiled in a fist-fight over a biro with Mick Jagger and Keith Richards of the Rolling Stones.

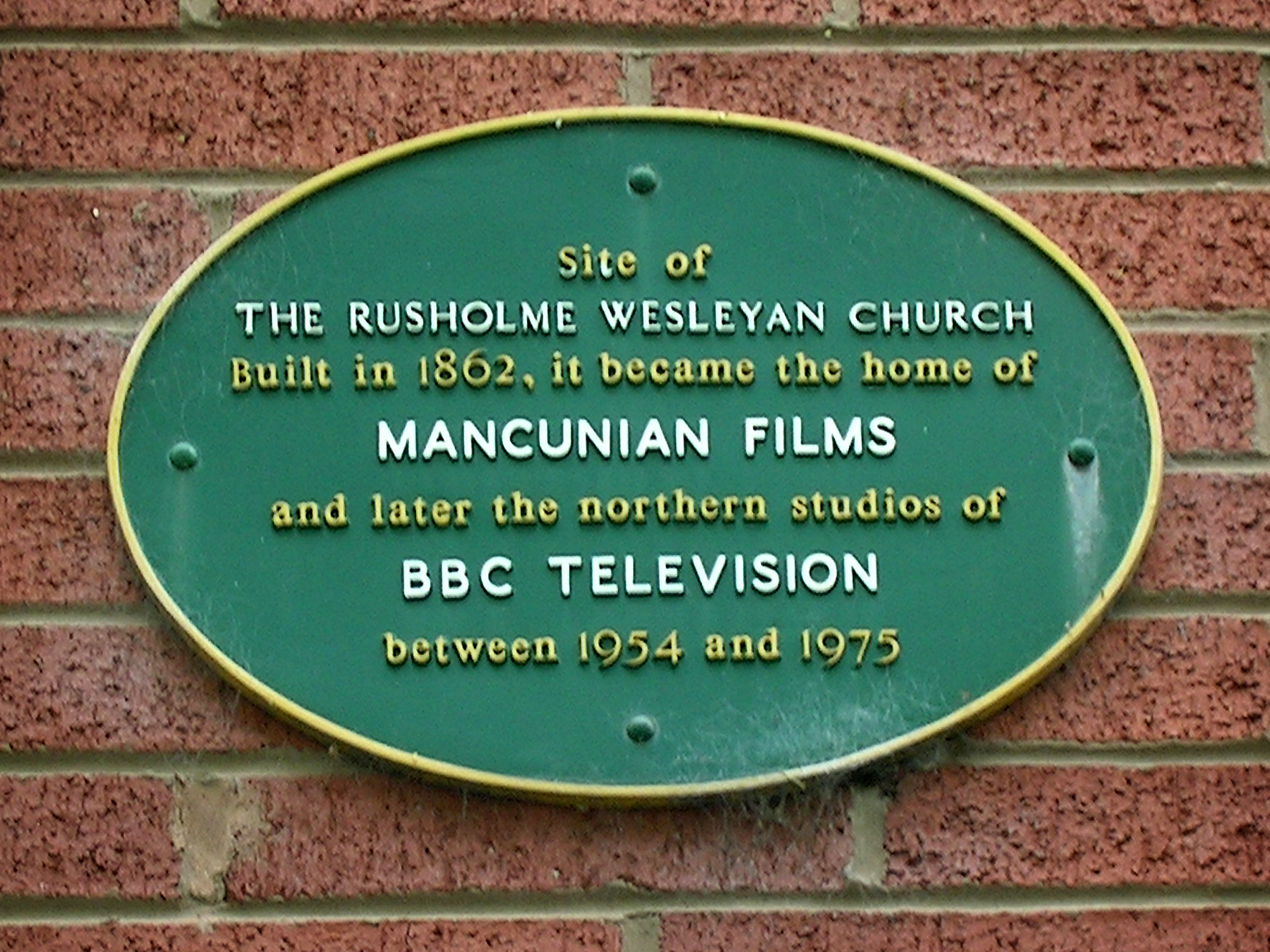
A plaque on a house wall marks the former site of Dickenson Road Studios.

The studios remained the home of Top of the Pops until 1966, when the show moved to a larger facility at Lime Grove Studios in London. These studios gave Johnnie Stewart more flexibility in the way the show was presented, with larger sets and the ability to attract a more trendy "Swinging London" studio audience. The first broadcast of Top of the Pops from Lime Grove went out on 20 January 1966.

Eventually the BBC's operations at Dickenson Road were transferred to the BBC's new building at New Broadcasting House on Oxford Road. The Dickenson Road building was demolished in 1975. Today the site is occupied by houses, to one of which a plaque that commemorates the history of Dickenson Road Studios is affixed.

== See also ==
- List of BBC properties
- List of British film studios
- List of performances on Top of the Pops
- Longsight Free Christian Church
