= List of BBC properties =

The British Broadcasting Corporation (BBC) operates from numerous properties across the United Kingdom and has historically occupied several others. Broadcasting House in London serves as the corporation's headquarters, with numerous other divisions also based in London and various locations throughout the UK. Since 2007, the BBC has been expanding its presence at MediaCityUK in Salford, resulting in the relocation of several departments there. Additionally, the corporation maintains production bases in Belfast, Birmingham, Bristol, Cardiff, and Glasgow. Beyond the UK, the BBC owns news bureaus and relay stations internationally.

== Current properties ==
=== England ===
Name	Location	Television services	Radio services	Other
Barnsley Digital Media Centre	Barnsley		Local studio for BBC Radio Sheffield	
Barnstaple Civic Centre	Barnstaple		Local studio for BBC Radio Devon	
BBC Broadcasting House (Cumbria)	Barrow-in-Furness		Local studio for BBC Radio Cumbria	
550 Thames Valley Park Drive	Reading		Local studio for BBC Radio Berkshire	
Bedford County Hall	Bedford	Local studio for BBC East	Local studio for BBC Three Counties Radio	
The Mailbox	Birmingham	BBC Midlands	BBC Radio WM	In addition to local and regional stations, is the headquarters for BBC England, the Regions Broadcast Support Centre, English Regions Technology, BBC HR, BBC Academy, BBC Radio 1 and Asian Network Newsbeat and BBC Asian Network and Radio 4 Drama (The Archers)
The Tea Factory	Digbeth, Birmingham	BBC Midlands	BBC WM	From 2027, all departments based at The Mailbox will relocate here. Currently under construction.
BBC Drama Village	Birmingham	BBC Studios		Studio centre for BBC Birmingham Network Production Unit. Located on University of Birmingham Selly Oak campus.
Wharfinger's House, 122 Fazeley Street	Digbeth, Birmingham	BBC Studios		Post production centre for BBC Studios network production, relocated from Drama Village to support Masterchef and other network production outside of drama
BBC Blackburn	Blackburn		BBC Radio Lancashire	Also known by address: Darwen Street.
Boston Business Centre	Boston		Local studio for BBC Lincolnshire	
BBC Brighton	Brighton		BBC Sussex	Also named Imperial House.
BBC Broadcasting House (Bristol)	Bristol	BBC West, BBC News	BBC Radio Bristol	
Bridgewater House	Bristol			Home to the BBC Natural History Unit, Countryfile and the BBC Bristol Network Production Unit.
Bromsgrove District Council House	Bromsgrove		Local studio for BBC Hereford and Worcester	
Burton upon Trent Town Hall	Burton upon Trent		Local studio for BBC Radio Derby	
BBC Broadcasting House (Cambridge)	Cambridge	BBC Look East (west opt-out)	BBC Radio Cambridgeshire	
Canterbury Christ Church University	Canterbury		Local studio for BBC Radio Kent	
BBC Broadcasting House (Carlisle)	Carlisle		BBC Radio Cumbria	
Sun Pier Chambers	Chatham	Local studio for BBC South East	Local studio for BBC Radio Kent	
BBC Broadcasting House (Chelmsford)	Chelmsford		BBC Essex	
BBC Chesterfield	Chesterfield		Local studio for BBC Radio Sheffield	
Mercantile House	Colchester	Local studio for BBC London	Local studio for BBC Essex	
Priory Place	Coventry		BBC CWR	
Dunsfold Aerodrome	Cranleigh			Production facility for Top Gear.
BBC Crawley	Crawley			Office use.
Crewe Municipal Buildings	Crewe		Local studio for BBC Radio Stoke	
Darlington Town Hall	Darlington		Local studio for BBC Tees	
BBC Broadcasting House (Derby)	Derby		BBC Radio Derby	
Portfolio House	Dorchester		Local studio for BBC Radio Solent	
Wood Norton	Evesham			Home of BBC Monitoring (1939–1943), home to BBC Academy since 1943. ViLOR (Virtualisation of Local Radio) Node North
BBC Broadcasting House (Exeter)	Exeter		Local studio for BBC Devon	
Accelerator Building, University of Sussex	Falmer			Production facility for Bang Goes the Theory.
BBC Broadcasting House (Gloucester)	Gloucester		BBC Radio Gloucestershire	
BBC Grimsby	Grimsby		Local studio for BBC Radio Humberside	
University of Surrey	Guildford		BBC Surrey	Premises located on university campus.
Claremont House	Harrogate		Local studio for BBC Radio York	
Hartlepool Civic Centre	Hartlepool		Local studio for BBC Tees	
Creative Media Centre	Hastings		Local studio for BBC Sussex	
Crowsley Park	Henley-on-Thames			Receiving station for BBC Monitoring.
Portcullis House	Hull	BBC Yorkshire and Lincolnshire	BBC Radio Humberside	
BBC Broadcasting House (Ipswich)	Ipswich		BBC Radio Suffolk	
BBC Kendal	Kendal		Local studio for BBC Radio Cumbria	
North Lynn Business Village	King's Lynn		Local studio for BBC Radio Norfolk	
BBC Lancaster	Lancaster		Local studio for BBC Radio Lancashire	
Royal Pump Rooms	Leamington Spa		Local studio for BBC CWR	
BBC Broadcasting Centre (Leeds)	Leeds	BBC Yorkshire	BBC Radio Leeds	Also known as Quarry Hill.
Leek Town Hall	Leek		Local studio for BBC Radio Stoke	
BBC Leicester	Leicester		BBC Radio Leicester	
BBC Broadcasting House (Dunstable)	Dunstable		BBC Three Counties Radio	
BBC Broadcasting House (Lincoln)	Lincoln	Local studio for BBC Yorkshire and Lincolnshire	BBC Radio Lincolnshire	
BBC Liverpool	Liverpool		BBC Radio Merseyside	Also known by address: College Lane/Hanover Street
BBC Park Western	London			Production facility for Silent Witness. (Production is scheduled to move to the West Midlands in early 2024). Home of BBC Newsgathering Operations, responsible for outside broadcasts for BBC News.
BBC Elstree Centre	London			Studio centre
Wogan House	London		BBC Radio 2, BBC Radio 6 Music, BBC Club	Formerly known as Western House
10 Hammersmith Grove	London			Home to UKTV
Broadcasting House	London	BBC One, BBC Two, BBC Three, BBC Four, BBC News (UK), BBC News International, BBC London	BBC Radio 1, BBC Radio 1Xtra, BBC Radio 3, BBC Radio 4, BBC Radio 4 Extra, BBC Radio London, BBC World Service	Headquarters of the BBC. Home of BBC News, BBC Television and BBC Radio.
BBC Maida Vale	London			Studio Centre. Home of BBC Symphony Orchestra and recording studios.
BBC Archive Centre	London			Home to the BBC Archives.
Queen Elizabeth Hall	London			Small area leased as a technical facility for recording events.
Royal Festival Hall	London			Small area leased as a technical facility for recording events.
Four Millbank	London	BBC Parliament		Parliamentary studio, leased from ITV, BBC News Politics, auxiliary studio for BBC News (UK), BBC News International, BBC Radio 4, BBC Radio 5 Live and BBC World Service.
BBC Television Centre	London			Former home of BBC Television. Mostly sold for development, but part let to BBC Worldwide and some BBC Studios staff. Home to BBC Studioworks and BBC Studios.
BBC White City (Broadcast Centre & Lighthouse)	London			Large office and production centre.
Maiden House	Maidenhead			Sublet to Atos
Ryedale House	Malton		Local studio for BBC Radio York	
Mansfield Civic Centre	Mansfield		Local studio for BBC Radio Nottingham	
Matlock Town Hall	Matlock		Local studio for BBC Radio Derby	
BBC Broadcasting House (Middlesbrough)	Middlesbrough		BBC Tees	
Pace Studios	Milton Keynes	Local studio for BBC East	Local studio for BBC Three Counties Radio	
Perry Building, The Open University	Milton Keynes			Programme production offices for BBC and Open University co-productions.
BBC Broadcasting Centre	Newcastle upon Tyne	BBC North East and Cumbria	BBC Radio Newcastle	
Riverside Centre	Newport, Isle of Wight		Local studio for BBC Radio Solent	
Northallerton County Hall	Northallerton		Local studio for BBC Tees	
BBC Broadcasting House (Northampton)	Northampton		BBC Radio Northampton	
The Forum	Norwich	BBC East	BBC Radio Norfolk	
BBC Nottingham	Nottingham	BBC East Midlands	BBC Radio Nottingham	
BBC Broadcasting House (Oxford)	Oxford	BBC Oxford opt-out region	BBC Radio Oxford	
Oldway Mansion	Paignton		Local studio for BBC Radio Devon	
Kings Chambers	Peterborough	Local studio for BBC East	Local studio for BBC Radio Cambridgeshire	
BBC Broadcasting House (Ingledene)	Plymouth	BBC South West	BBC Radio Devon	
Gunwharf Quays	Portsmouth		Local studio for BBC Radio Solent	
Thames Valley Park	Reading	Local studio for BBC South	BBC Radio Berkshire	
Redditch Town Hall	Redditch		Local studio for BBC Hereford and Worcester	
Rugby Art Gallery and Museum	Rugby		Local studio for BBC CWR	
MediaCityUK	Salford	BBC North West, CBBC, CBeebies, BBC Manchester, BBC North West Tonight, BBC Breakfast, BBC Sports Centre news room, BBC Sport, BBC News (UK), BBC News International	BBC Radio 5 Live, BBC Radio 5 Sports Extra, BBC Radio Manchester, BBC Radio 6 Music (programmes)	Headquarters of the BBC North Group Division, home to BBC Children's and Education, BBC Philharmonic, BBC Research North Lab, BBC Learning, BBC Future Media, BBC Vision North, BBC support teams, BBC Blue Peter, BBC Stargazing (science production). BBC News (regional production & sport)
Beckett House	Salisbury	Local studio for BBC South	Local studio for BBC Radio Wiltshire	
Scarborough Art Gallery	Scarborough	Local studio for BBC Yorkshire	Local studio for BBC Radio York	
BBC Scunthorpe	Scunthorpe		Local studio for BBC Radio Humberside	
BBC Sheffield	Sheffield		BBC Radio Sheffield	
BBC Broadcasting House (Shrewsbury)	Shrewsbury		BBC Radio Shropshire	
BBC Broadcasting House (Southampton)	Southampton	BBC South	BBC Radio Solent	
Gamble Institute and Central Library	St Helens, Merseyside		Local studio for BBC Radio Merseyside	
Stafford County Buildings	Stafford		Local studio for BBC Radio Stoke	
Cheapside	Stoke-on-Trent		BBC Radio Stoke	
Shakespeare Centre Library	Stratford-upon-Avon		Local studio for BBC CWR	
David Puttnam Media Centre	Sunderland		Local office for BBC Newcastle inside newsroom at University of Sunderland	
BBC Broadcasting House (Swindon)	Swindon		BBC Wiltshire	
Bedes House	Taunton	Local studio for BBC West	BBC Somerset	
Hazeldene House, Telford Shopping Centre	Telford	Local studio for BBC Midlands	Local studio for BBC Radio Shropshire	
Trowbridge Council Offices	Trowbridge		Local studio for BBC Wiltshire	
Phoenix Wharf	Truro		BBC Radio Cornwall	Also known as Phoenix Wharf.
The Great Hall	Tunbridge Wells	BBC South East	BBC Radio Kent	
The Colosseum	Watford			Host venue of BBC Concert Orchestra and frequently occupied for production of Friday Night is Music Night.
Post Office Chambers	Whitehaven	Local studio for BBC North East and Cumbria	Local studio for BBC Radio Cumbria	
Newhampton Arts Centre	Wolverhampton	Local studio for BBC Midlands	Local studio for BBC Radio WM	
BBC Broadcasting House (Worcester)	Worcester		BBC Hereford and Worcester	
BBC Broadcasting House (York)	York		BBC Radio York	

=== Northern Ireland ===
Name	Location	Television services	Radio services	Other
Armagh Planetarium	Armagh		Network studio for BBC Radio Ulster and BBC Radio Foyle	
Ballymena Museum & Town Hall	Ballymena	Network studio for BBC Northern Ireland	Network studio for BBC Radio Ulster and BBC Radio Foyle	
BBC Blackstaff House	Belfast			Studio for BBC Northern Ireland
BBC Broadcasting House (Belfast)	Belfast	BBC Northern Ireland	BBC Radio Ulster	Home to BBC Northern Ireland National Production Centre
Ferguson House	Coleraine		Network studio for BBC Radio Ulster and BBC Radio Foyle	
BBC Derry	Derry		BBC Radio Foyle	Also known by address: Northland Road
St. Patrick Centre	Downpatrick		Network studio for BBC Radio Ulster and BBC Radio Foyle	
Intec Centre	Enniskillen		Network studio for BBC Radio Ulster and BBC Radio Foyle	
Newry Council Offices	Newry		Network studio for BBC Radio Ulster and BBC Radio Foyle	
Sketrick House	Newtownards	Network studio for BBC Northern Ireland	Network studio for BBC Radio Ulster and BBC Radio Foyle	
BBC Omagh	Omagh		Network studio for BBC Radio Ulster	

=== Scotland ===
Name	Location	Television services	Radio services	Other
BBC Ayr	Ayr	Network studio for BBC Scotland	Network studio for BBC Radio Scotland and BBC Radio nan Gàidheal	Also known by address: Churchill Tower
BBC Broadcasting House (Aberdeen)	Aberdeen	Network studio for BBC Scotland	Network studio for BBC Radio Scotland and BBC Radio nan Gàidheal	
Liniclate Community School	Benbecula			Recording studio
BBC Production Village	Dumbarton			studio Centre for BBC Scotland Network Production Unit.
Elmbank	Dumfries	Network studio for BBC Scotland	Network studio for BBC Radio Scotland	
BBC Dundee	Dundee		Network studio for BBC Radio Scotland	
The Tun	Edinburgh	Network studio for BBC Scotland	Network studio for BBC Radio Scotland	
BBC Pacific Quay	Glasgow	BBC Scotland, BBC Alba	BBC Radio Scotland and BBC Radio nan Gàidheal	Home to BBC Scotland Network Production Centre, BBC News (technology & science)
Glasgow North Trading Estate	Glasgow			Ancillary use
BBC Broadcasting House (Inverness)	Inverness	Network studio for BBC Scotland, BBC Alba	Network studio for BBC Radio nan Gàidheal	
Commercial Union House	Kirkwall		BBC Radio Orkney	
BBC Shetland	Lerwick		BBC Radio Shetland and Network studio for BBC Radio Scotland	
BBC Oban	Oban			Ancillary use
Clydesdale Bank Building	Portree	Network studio for BBC Scotland		
BBC Selkirk	Selkirk		Network studio for BBC Radio Scotland	
Cottrell Building, University of Stirling	Stirling			Office use for BBC Scotland.
Rosebank	Stornoway	Network studio for BBC Alba	Network studio for BBC Radio Scotland and BBC Radio nan Gàidheal	

=== Wales ===
Name	Location	Television services	Radio services	Other
Aberystwyth University	Aberystwyth	Network studio for BBC Cymru Wales	Network studio for BBC Radio Cymru and BBC Radio Wales	On Aberystwyth University's Penglais campus
BBC Bangor	Bangor	Network studio for BBC Cymru Wales	Network studio for BBC Radio Cymru and BBC Radio Wales	Also known as Bryn Meirion.
BBC New Broadcasting House (Cardiff), 3 Central Square	Cardiff	BBC Cymru Wales	BBC Radio Wales and BBC Radio Cymru	BBC News Science, Environment & Climate Change, Broadcasts commenced in 2020
BBC Hoddinott Hall (Wales Millennium Centre)	Cardiff			Home of BBC National Orchestra of Wales
St David's Hall	Cardiff			BBC National Orchestra of Wales is orchestra in residence of property.
Roath Lock	Cardiff Bay		Studio centre for BBC Cymru Wales Drama productions	Home of Casualty and Pobol y Cwm.
Priory House	Carmarthen	Network studio for BBC Cymru Wales	Network studio for BBC Radio Cymru and BBC Radio Wales	
Pembrokeshire College	Haverfordwest		Local studio for BBC Radio Wales and BBC Radio Cymru	
Hotel Metropole	Llandrindod Wells		Local studio for BBC Radio Wales and BBC Radio Cymru	
Ladywell House	Newtown		Local studio for BBC Radio Wales and BBC Radio Cymru	
BBC Penrhyndeudraeth	Penrhyndeudraeth		Local studio for BBC Radio Cymru and BBC Radio Wales	
BBC Dylan Thomas House (Swansea)	Swansea	Network studio for BBC Cymru Wales	Network studio for BBC Radio Cymru and BBC Radio Wales	
Centre for the Creative Industries, Glyndŵr University	Wrexham	Network studio for BBC Cymru Wales	Network studio for BBC Radio Wales and BBC Radio Cymru	

=== British Crown dependencies ===
Name	Location	Television services	Radio services	Other
BBC Television House	Saint Sampson, Guernsey	Local studio for BBC Channel Islands opt-out	BBC Radio Guernsey	
Broadcasting House (Douglas)	Douglas, Isle of Man			
BBC Jersey	Saint Helier, Jersey	BBC Channel Islands opt-out	BBC Radio Jersey	

=== International ===
In addition to the domestic bases, the BBC has numerous bases internationally to monitor the global news organisations and to gather news stories. The BBC itself does not publish the exact location of each of their news bureau in case of attack or harassment of staff because of their employment by the broadcaster, which aims to be politically neutral.

City	Country	Services	Purpose
Abidjan	Ivory Coast	Part of BBC World Service	Newsgathering and production
Abuja	Nigeria	Part of BBC World Service	Newsgathering and production
Accra	Ghana	Part of BBC World Service	Newsgathering and production
Addis Ababa	Ethiopia	Part of BBC World Service	Newsgathering and production
Almaty	Kazakhstan	Part of BBC World Service	Newsgathering and production
Amman	Jordan	Part of BBC World Service	Newsgathering and production
Baghdad	Iraq		Newsgathering and production
Baku	Azerbaijan		Monitoring for Global News Division
Baku	Azerbaijan	Part of BBC World Service	Newsgathering and production
Bangkok	Thailand		Newsgathering and production
Beijing	China		Newsgathering and production
Beirut	Lebanon		Newsgathering and production
Berlin	Germany		Newsgathering and production
Bishkek	Kyrgyzstan	Part of BBC World Service	Newsgathering and production
Boston	United States	Part of BBC World Service	Newsgathering and production
Brussels	Belgium		Office Work, newsgathering and production
Buenos Aires	Argentina	Part of BBC World Service	Newsgathering and production
Bujumbura	Burundi	Part of BBC World Service	Newsgathering and production
Cairo	Egypt		Newsgathering, production and monitoring
Cairo	Egypt	Part of BBC World Service	Newsgathering and production
Casablanca	Morocco	Part of BBC World Service	Newsgathering and production
Chennai	India	Part of BBC World Service	Newsgathering and production
Colombo	Sri Lanka		Newsgathering and production
Dakar	Senegal	Part of BBC World Service	Newsgathering and production
Damascus	Syria	Part of BBC World Service	Newsgathering and production
Dar es Salaam	Tanzania	Part of BBC World Service	Newsgathering and production
Delhi	India		Newsgathering, Production and Monitoring
Dhaka	Bangladesh	Part of BBC World Service	Newsgathering and production
Dubai	United Arab Emirates	Part of BBC World Service	Newsgathering and production
Dublin	Republic of Ireland		Office work and Newsgathering
Dushanbe	Tajikistan	Part of BBC World Service	Newsgathering and production
Gaza	Palestinian territories		Newsgathering and production (Temporarily closed due to 2023 Israel-Gaza War)
Geneva	Switzerland		Newsgathering and production
Havana	Cuba		Newsgathering and production
Herat	Afghanistan		Monitoring for Global News Division
Hong Kong	Hong Kong	Part of BBC World Service	Newsgathering and production
Islamabad	Pakistan	Part of BBC World Service	Newsgathering and production
Istanbul	Turkey		Newsgathering and production
Jakarta	Indonesia	Part of BBC World Service	Newsgathering and production
Jerusalem	Israel		Newsgathering and production
Johannesburg	South Africa		Newsgathering and production
Kabul	Afghanistan		Newsgathering and production
Kabul	Afghanistan	Part of BBC World Service	Newsgathering, production and monitoring
Kampala	Uganda	Part of BBC World Service	Newsgathering and production
Karachi	Pakistan	Part of BBC World Service	Newsgathering and production
Kathmandu	Nepal	Part of BBC World Service	Newsgathering and production
Khartoum	Sudan	Part of BBC World Service	Newsgathering and production
Kyiv	Ukraine		Monitoring for Global News division
Kyiv	Ukraine	Part of BBC World Service	Newsgathering and production
Kigali	Rwanda	Part of BBC World Service	Newsgathering and production
Kinshasa	Democratic Republic of Congo	Part of BBC World Service	Newsgathering and production
Kolkata	India	Part of BBC World Service	Newsgathering and production
Kuala Lumpur	Malaysia		Newsgathering and production
Kuwait City	Kuwait	Part of BBC World Service	Newsgathering and production
Lagos	Nigeria		Newsgathering and production
Lahore	Pakistan	Part of BBC World Service	Newsgathering and production
Los Angeles	United States		Newsgathering and production
Mazar-i-Sharif	Afghanistan	Part of BBC World Service	Newsgathering and production
Mexico City	Mexico	Part of BBC World Service	Newsgathering and production
Miami	United States	Part of BBC World Service	Newsgathering and production
Monrovia	Liberia	Part of BBC World Service	Newsgathering and production
Moscow	Russia		Newsgathering, Production and Monitoring
Nairobi	Kenya	production studio for BBC News Africa, Focus on Africa	Newsgathering and production
Nairobi	Kenya		Monitoring for Global News Division
New York	United States	BBC America	Newsgathering and production
New York (United Nations)	United States		Newsgathering and production
Paris	France		Newsgathering and production
Peshawar	Pakistan	Part of BBC World Service	Newsgathering and production
Pristina	Kosovo	Part of BBC World Service	Newsgathering and production
Rabat	Morocco	Part of BBC World Service	Newsgathering and production
Ramallah	Palestinian territories		Newsgathering and production
Riyadh	Saudi Arabia	Part of BBC World Service	Newsgathering and production
Rome	Italy		Newsgathering and production
São Paulo	Brazil	Part of BBC World Service	Newsgathering and production
Seoul	South Korea		Newsgathering and production
Shanghai	China		Newsgathering and production
Singapore	Singapore	BBC News (UK), BBC News International	Newsgathering and production, studio for Newsday, Asia Business Report
Skopje	North Macedonia	Part of BBC World Service	Newsgathering and production
Tashkent	Uzbekistan		Monitoring for Global News Division
Tbilisi	Georgia		Monitoring for Global News Division
Tehran	Iran		Newsgathering and production
Tirana	Albania	Part of BBC World Service	Newsgathering and production
Tiraspol	Moldova		Monitoring for Global News division
Tokyo	Japan		Newsgathering and production
Washington, D.C.	United States	BBC News (UK), BBC News International	Newsgathering and production studio for BBC World News America
Yaoundé	Cameroon	Part of BBC World Service	Newsgathering and production
Yerevan	Armenia		Monitoring for Global News division

In addition to the above properties, the BBC also own radio relays including the Limassol BBC Relay on Cyprus.

== Former properties ==
Historically, the BBC has used a number of different properties that have been sold or vacated by the corporation.

Name	Location	Television services	Radio services	Other
Pebble Mill Studios	Birmingham	BBC Midlands (1971–2004)	BBC Radio Birmingham, later BBC Radio WM (1971–2004)	Studio centre and home to BBC Birmingham network production unit.
Broad Street	Broad Street, Birmingham	BBC Midlands (1964–1971)		
Carpenter Road	Edgbaston, Birmingham			Home of BBC Birmingham network production centre (c.1950–1971)
Bournemouth International Centre	Bournemouth	Local studio for BBC South	Local studio for BBC Radio Solent	Closed as of 2019
National Science and Media Museum	Bradford	Local studio for BBC Yorkshire	Local studio for BBC Radio Leeds	
Broadway Methodist Chapel	Broadway, Roath, Cardiff	BBC Cymru Wales television studios (1955–1966)		
Stacey Road	Stacey Road, Roath, Cardiff	BBC Cymru Wales television studios (1959–1966)		
Baynton House, Cardiff	Llandaff, Cardiff	BBC Cymru Wales (1952–1966); BBC One Wales (1952–1966); BBC Two Wales (1952–1966)	BBC Radio Wales (1952–1966); BBC Radio Cymru (1952–1966)	The main headquarters for BBC Cymru Wales between 1952 and 1966. Broadcasts ceased in 1975 when it was demolished to make way for Broadcasting House's E-Block extension.
Broadcasting House, Cardiff	Llandaff, Cardiff	BBC Cymru Wales (1966–2020); BBC One Wales (1966–2020); BBC Two Wales (1966–2020)	BBC Radio Wales (1978–2020); BBC Radio Cymru (1977–2020)	The main headquarters for BBC Cymru Wales between 1966 and 2020. Broadcasts ceased in September 2020, with most operations having moved to BBC Cymru Wales New Broadcasting House in Central Square, Cardiff.
Ty Oldfield	Cardiff			Offices and administration, located across the road from Broadcasting House, Llandaff. Closed in 2019. Site awaiting redevelopment.
Warwick Road	Coventry		BBC CWR (1990–1995)	
Queen Margaret Drive	Glasgow	BBC Scotland until 2007	BBC Radio Scotland and BBC Radio nan Gàidheal until 2007	Home to BBC Scotland Network Production Centre from creation until 2007
2 Whitefriars Court	Great Yarmouth		District office and studio for BBC Radio Norfolk from 1984 until 2017	Used for live reports, interviews with guests from the Great Yarmouth area and the preparation of pre-recorded items by the Great Yarmouth district reporter. Also occasionally used for full live programmes. At one point in its history it was the base for three staff; a receptionist, a producer and a reporter. Latterly, it was a one-person operation staffed only by the district reporter.
17 Kingsmead Square	Bath		Local studio for BBC Radio Bristol	
Shiretown House	Hereford		Local studio for BBC Hereford and Worcester	Closed Christmas 2016.
9 Chapel Street	Hull	BBC Yorkshire and Lincolnshire (2001–2004)		
Langley OB Base	Langley, Berkshire			Home to BBC TV Outside Broadcasts (2007–2008) when it was then purchased by SiS Live. The SiS TV outside broadcast operation closed down in 2014. BBC Radio outside broadcast also occupied the site (2007–2014) before moving to Park Royal.
Alexandra Palace	London	BBC Television Service (1936–1956)		Studios used for BBC TV until the station moved to Lime Grove in 1956. Was also the base for BBC TV News, until it moved to Television Centre in 1969, and for Open University broadcasts. Closed in 1981.
BBC Henry Wood House	London			Contained some activities of the BBC Audio and Music and BBC Research departments.
Bush House	London		BBC World Service (1941–2012)	
Egton House	London		BBC Radio 1 (1967–1996)	Connected to adjacent Broadcasting House through a subway, and as a result often thought of as part of Broadcasting House. Demolished in 2003 to make way for the new Egton Wing of Broadcasting House.
Yalding House	London		BBC Radio 1 (1996–2013); BBC Radio 1Xtra	
Brock House	London			Former administration building
Golders Green Hippodrome	London			Radio studio and concert hall and home to the BBC Concert Orchestra between 1969 and 2003
Langham Hotel	London			Supported BBC Broadcasting House nearby. Home to the BBC record library between 1965 and 1986.
16 Langham Street	London			BBC Radio Comedy and Writers Room
180 Great Portland Street	London			Former headquarters of BBC Trust
Lime Grove Studios	London			
1-2 Marylebone High Street	London	BBC Publishing (later BBC Enterprises, then BBC Worldwide), including BBC Software		
35 Marylebone High Street	London	Radio Times / The Listener / BBC Publishing (later BBC Enterprises, then BBC Worldwide), BBC London (2001–2009)	BBC London 94.9/GLR/BBC Radio London (late 70's-2009)	
Paris Theatre	London			Radio Theatre used between the early 1960s and 1995
Savoy Hill House	London			Home of the British Broadcasting Company and the subsequent corporation 1923 and 1932, when the BBC moved to Broadcasting House.
BBC Kendal Avenue	Acton, London			Former outside broadcast base, sold to developers in 2007 when the outside broadcast base was moved to Langley. Demolished and redeveloped.
Ironworks Development	Bow, London	BBC News Channel; BBC World News; BBC Sport	BBC Radio 5 Live; BBC World Service	Small temporary studio used during the 2012 Summer Olympics
Windmill Road	Brentford, London			Home to the BBC Television and Sound Archive until 2011. Gave its name to the 1980s BBC2 show Windmill, which looked at archive material held at Windmill Road.
Camden Palace	Camden Town, London			Radio studio between 1945 and c.1970.
BBC Villiers House	Ealing, London			Former offices, including BBC Education, BBCs Finance and Accounting Services. Sublet to University of West London since Autumn 2013.
Ealing Studios	Ealing, London			Studio Centre. Home to BBC Film Department between 1955 and 1995. Sold off in 1995.
BBC Victoria Road	North Acton, London			Former home to the BBC Television Rehearsal Rooms and the Costume and Wigs Department. Known as the "Acton Hilton" by many of the actors who rehearsed there. Demolished in Summer 2010.
BBC Television Theatre	Shepherd's Bush, London			Studio Centre bought in 1953 and vacated in 1991. In 1994, the building re-opened under its original name of The Shepherd's Bush Empire
BBC Woodlands	White City, London	BBC Enterprises (later BBC Worldwide)		Former home to the BBC's commercial services, such as programme sales, videos, DVDs, LPs, CDs, books, magazine, computer software and merchandising.
BBC White City (White City One, Media Centre, Energy Centre, Garden House)	White City, London			Former home of several production teams and administration departments.
BBC Centre House	White City, London			Former home to BBC Research South Lab
Old Broadcasting House	Leeds	BBC North (1968–2002), BBC Yorkshire (2002–2004)	BBC Radio Leeds (1968–2004)	
New Broadcasting House	Manchester	BBC North West (1981–2011)	BBC Radio Manchester (1975–2011)	Previously also home to BBC Manchester Network Production Unit, BBC Philharmonic and BBC Religion and Ethics department
Dickenson Road Studios	Rusholme, Manchester	BBC North (1954–1975)		Former base of Mancunian Films
Longsight Free Christian Church	Longsight, Manchester			Outside broadcast unit garage
Old Broadcasting House	Piccadilly, Manchester	BBC North West (1929–1981)		
Broadcasting House	Newcastle	BBC North East and Cumbria		
St. Catherine's Close	Norwich	BBC East		Base for the BBC regional service in the East of England from 1956 to 2003, prior to the service moving to The Forum.
Lighthouse Arts Centre	Poole		Local studio for BBC Radio Solent	Closed as of 2019
Caversham Park	Reading	Local studio for BBC South	BBC Radio Berkshire	Former home of BBC Monitoring and of the BBC Written Archive
South Western House	Southampton	BBC South (1961–1991)	BBC Radio Solent (1970–1991)	Former railway hotel occupied by BBC South until move into Broadcasting House (Southampton) in 1991.
Kingswood Warren	Tadworth, Surrey			Home to BBC Research, and its predecessors, between 1948 and 2010.

== See also ==
- BBC
- BBC Television
- BBC Radio
