= Over the Garden Wall (1950 film) =

British comedy by John E. Blakeley

- Directed by: John E. Blakeley
- Written by: Harry Jackson; John E. Blakeley
- Produced by: John E. Blakeley
- Starring: Norman Evans; Jimmy James; Dan Young
- Cinematography: Ernest Palmer
- Edited by: Dorothy Stimson
- Music by: F.M. Whitefoot; Billy Butler
- Production company: Mancunian Films
- Distributed by: Mancunian Films
- Release date: 20 November 1950
- Running time: 94 minutes
- Country: United Kingdom
- Language: English

Over the Garden Wall is a 1950 British "B" comedy film directed by John E. Blakeley and starring Norman Evans, Jimmy James and Dan Young. It was written by Harry Jackson and Blakeley. Although made on a low budget, the film often topped double bills at cinemas in the North of England because of the popularity of the performers.

== Plot ==
Working class couple Fanny and Joe are determined to give their daughter Mary and her husband a posh home-coming party. Trouble arises when the son of Joe's boss turns up and shamelessly flirts with their daughter.

== Cast ==
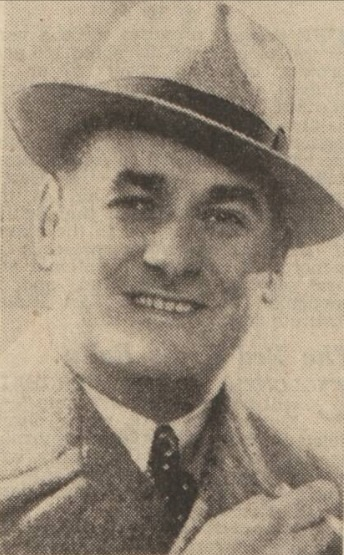
Comedian Norman Evans appears in drag in the lead role as housewife Fanny Lawton

- Norman Evans as Fanny Lawton
- Jimmy James as Joe Lawton
- Dan Young as Dan
- Alec Pleon as Alec
- Sonya O'Shea as Mary Harrison
- Frederick Bradshaw as Ken Smith
- Agnes Bernelle as Val Westwood
- Neville Brook as Mr. Smith
- John Wynn as Tony Harrison
- Patrick Baring
- Billy Howard
- Langley Howard
- Eli Woods as Eli

== Production ==
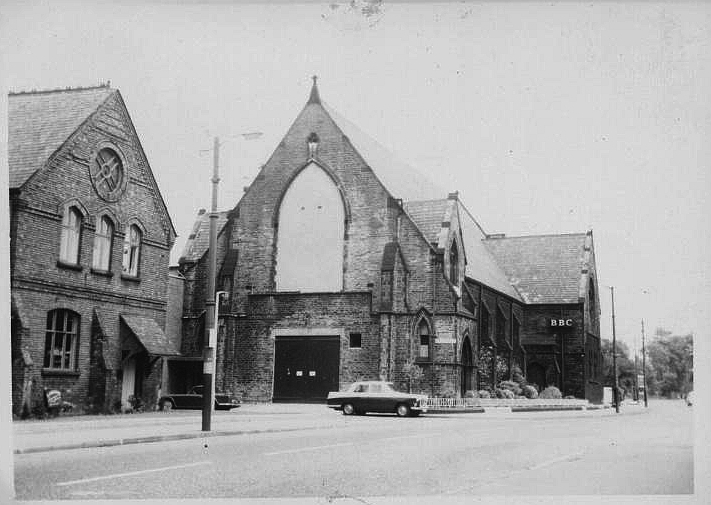
Over the Garden Wall was filmed at Dickenson Road Studios in Rusholme, Manchester

Over the Garden Wall was produced by Mancunian Films. It was filmed entirely at Dickenson Road Studios in Rusholme, Manchester.

For the lead character, comedian Norman Evans reprised his popular stage character act Fanny Fairbottom. He had previously played this role in the 1944 film, Demobbed, in which his Fanny character appears as a pantomime dame in a comedy burlesque concert staged by a group of demobilised soldiers. Fanny appears in a monologue sketch entitled "Over the Garden Wall" gossping with an unseen neighbour, Mrs Jones.

Evans' monologue comedy routine gained popularity, and he appeared as Fanny Fairbottom in a BBC Radio programme, also titled Over the Garden Wall, which was broadcast on the BBC Light Programme between 1948 and 1950.

== Reception ==
When it was released, Over the Garden Wall enjoyed considerable success. Although most Mancunian productions were only popular in the North of England, Over the Garden Wall attracted audiences in the South, being screened at a large number of cinemas on the Granada Theatres, Odeon and ABC circuits, notably in popular seaside resorts.

Despite its popularity, the Over the Garden Wall film was poorly regarded at the time by the National Film Finance Corporation (NFFC), who decided to withdraw financial support from Mancunian Films. The NFFC chairman, Lord Reith, expressed dissatisfaction with the quality of Mancunian's comedy productions; of Over the Garden Wall , Reith said it was not "of as high a quality as the Corporation would have wished".

Kine Weekly called the film a "disjointed knockabout comedy", adding "the picture tries to set off its corny cracks against a romantic background, but the tangled love interest is so clumsily handled that unintentional laughs are more numerous than intentional. At best, third-rate music hall, flatly photographed."

In British Sound Films: The Studio Years 1928–1959 David Quinlan rated the film as "poor", writing: "The stars spend too much time off-screen in this extension of Norman Evans's famous variety act. Interesting that when it was reissued ten years later, 40 minutes were taken out of it. Nobody complained."

== Legacy ==
Norman Evans' appearance in drag as Fanny Lawton was an influential performance in the history of female impersonation on-screen, and his character later inspired the comedian Les Dawson with his comedy drag act as Cissy Braithwaite.
