= Bernard Youens =

English actor (1914–1984)

- Born: Bernard Arthur Popley; 28 December 1914; Hove, Sussex, England
- Died: 27 August 1984 (aged 69); Salford, England
- Occupations: Actor, announcer
- Years active: 1956–1984
- Employer: ITV
- Television: Coronation Street (1964–1984)
- Spouse: Edna Swallow (m. 1937)
- Children: 5

Bernard Arthur Popley (28 December 1914 – 27 August 1984), better known by his stage name Bernard Youens, was an English character actor of stage and television, and briefly appeared in radio plays and had cameos in film. He was also a TV announcer and is perhaps best remembered for his portrayal of Stan Ogden in the serial soap opera Coronation Street from 1964 until his death in 1984.

== Early years ==
Born in Hove, Sussex, Youens began his stage career as a 16-year-old after becoming assistant stage manager at the Players Theatre in Newcastle upon Tyne. Youens was from a working class family who had no theatre connections. He went on to spend much of the 1930s honing his craft in repertory theatre. His acting career was interrupted by World War II, during which he served as a corporal with the 1st Battalion, Loyal Regiment (North Lancashire) in North Africa and Italy. He was wounded by shrapnel in his right leg in Anzio in February 1944. He returned to rep after the war, while also working as a publican, bread salesman, van driver and a labourer.

== Stage ==
Youens was a member of Frank Fortesque's Players after the war. Bernard "Bunny" Graham (Youens used Graham as a stage name at the time; Bunny was his wife's pet name for him) appears in the film Cup-tie Honeymoon, a Mancunian Films production, with Betty Jumel. This was the first film to be shot at their Rusholme Studio in Manchester, with exteriors filmed at Maine Road football ground and Abney Hall in Cheadle. In the film, veteran comedian Sandy Powell performed one of his stage sketches, The Soldier's Return Home, with a young actress, Pat Pilkington, later known as Pat Phoenix who played Elsie Tanner in Coronation Street. Despite dreadful reviews, the film was a success in the North West.

== Television ==
Youens became a continuity announcer in May 1956 for Granada Television, which had just been launched, in which his velvet-voiced tones were in marked contrast to the character for which he would gain national attention. Youens also took minor roles in several ITV series at the time, and radio plays such as William Wilberforce on the BBC Home Service in October 1959 although he declined the chance to audition for Coronation Street when it was launched, preferring the security of his announcer's role, before eventually passing an audition. His first words were "A pint of mild and 20 fags, missus" in June 1964. His role resulted in him often being engaged to open fetes and stores (such as the reopened FW Woolworth in South Shields in 1970.)

When asked what he thought when a national British newspaper had dubbed his character "the uncrowned king of the non-working classes", he replied: "Stan is my creation and I am proud of him." Youens was delighted to meet Sir John Betjeman, then the Poet Laureate, who had for many years expressed a desire to meet "Hilda and her ghastly husband". Meet they did, and Youens often commented that Betjeman, bounding around the studios meeting everyone "like a schoolboy" was a fond memory. Lord Olivier also expressed a wish to appear in the programme. Olivier's schedule precluded an intended uncredited appearance in a January 1978 episode, and, in the bar at Granada TV, Youens told him, "I'm so sorry I couldn't appear opposite you", to which Olivier replied: "Not as sorry as I am." In May 1982, Youens met the Queen when she visited the set of Coronation Street. On 23 January 1984, he and Jean Alexander attended a showbusiness reception at 10 Downing Street with other Coronation Street actors.

== Illness and death ==
A heavy smoker, Youens suffered a heart attack in 1972, and then on 30 October 1975 suffered a stroke which left him with a speech difficulty, though speech therapy eradicated some of this. The writers brought in Eddie Yeats (Geoffrey Hughes) as a lodger for Stan and Hilda. This reduced Youens's dialogue and allowed him to continue as a regular character until early 1984. His final Coronation Street appearance was on 7 March 1984. Having suffered most of his later life with severe arthritis in the neck and knees, Youens was taken into hospital on 2 April 1984 with the condition and over the next three months his health deteriorated rapidly. He suffered a second stroke on 12 May 1984. Subsequently in July he contracted gangrene in his left leg, resulting in amputation. The explanation for his absence from Coronation Street was that he had been admitted to hospital after becoming ill, on the doctor's orders after Hilda collapsed from exhaustion to the strain of looking after him as his health deteriorated. Youens died peacefully in his sleep at Salford Royal Hospital on 27 August 1984 after suffering a heart attack. He was 69. The decision to kill off the Stan Ogden character was made soon after Youens died, and on 21 November 1984 it was revealed onscreen that the character had died in hospital.

== Family ==
Youens married Edna Swallow, known as "Teddy", in Halifax on 21 September 1937. They had two daughters and three sons. His youngest son, Michael, was a film cameraman on many episodes of Coronation Street. Edna died in 2001, aged 88.

== Filmography ==
year	role	title
1948	Cup-Tie Honeymoon (film)	Coalman
1948	Somewhere in Politics (film) (credited as Bernard Graham)	Bank Manager
1948	International Circus Review (film) (credited as Bunny Graham)	
1955	Love and Kisses (TV series) (credited as Bernard Graham)	Terence Steel
1958	The Verdict is Yours (TV series)	
1959	Skyport (TV series)	
1964	ITV Play of the Week (TV series)	
1964–1984	Coronation Street	Stan Ogden
1969–1970	All Star Comedy Carnival (TV movie)	Stan Ogden
