= Joyanne Bracewell =

British High Court Judge (1934–2007)

Dame Joyanne Winifred Bracewell, DBE, FRSA (5 July 1934 – 9 January 2007) was the most senior judge of the Family Division of the High Court of Justice at the time of her death, after the President of the Family Division.

== Personal life ==
Bracewell was born on 5 July 1934 in Burnage, Manchester. She was the daughter of Jack Bracewell, the director of a cotton manufacturing company, and Lilian (née Gibson) Bracewell.

She was a child actress, appearing on Children's Hour in productions of E. Nesbit's plays and in two comedy films made in Manchester in 1948, Cup-tie Honeymoon and Holidays with Pay. After being educated mostly at home, she studied at the University of Manchester, receiving her LLB in 1954 and her LLM in 1956.

On 12 September 1963, she married Roy Copeland, a gifted jazz musician. They adopted two children, Philippa and Adam.

== Career ==
She was called to the Bar at Gray's Inn in 1955 and did her pupillage at the Bar from 1955 to 1956 with Godfrey Heilpern. She then became a tenant of his chambers in Manchester. As women were not able to attend bar mess dinners, she was elected to the circuit at the business court instead. She was a Member of the Northern Circuit from 1955 to 1990, and was appointed QC in 1978.

== Judicial career ==
She was a Recorder of the Crown Court between 1975 and 1983, and was a Circuit Judge on the Northern Circuit from 1983 to 1986, moving to the Western Circuit from 1986 to 1990. In 1990, she became the fifth woman to be appointed as High Court judge, after Elizabeth Lane, Rose Heilbron, Margaret Booth, and Elizabeth Butler-Sloss. As is customary, she was created Dame Commander of the Order of the British Empire (DBE). She was largely responsible for drafting, and oversaw the introduction of, the Children Act 1989, serving as Family Law Division Liaison Judge in the Royal Courts of Justice from 1990 to 1997; she was also Chair of the Children Act Advisory Committee from 1993 to 1997. She worked on the Annual Report and the Handbook of Best Practice in Children Act Cases (1997).

She was involved in many high-profile cases. In 2004, she was praised by Fathers4Justice as "one of the more enlightened members of the judiciary" after she gave a residence order to a father whose former wife repeatedly refused him access, in defiance of earlier court orders. In February 2006, she ruled that two children should live with their mother's former same-sex partner, after the mother took the children to live in a different county, in defiance of a shared residence order. Her order was upheld by the Court of Appeal but overturned by the House of Lords. Her proposals for early intervention were codified in the Children and Adoption Act 2006.

She was awarded an honorary LLD by Manchester University in 1991, and was appointed Fellow, Royal Society of Arts in 1994. She was a consulting editor for Butterworth's Family Law Service from 1989 until her death, and editor in chief of The Family Court Practice from its first publication in 1993.

== Death ==
Dame Joyanne Bracewell died of metastasized breast cancer on 9 January 2007, aged 72, at St Margaret's Hospice, Yeovil, Somerset. She was survived by her husband and children.
