= Jumel (surname) =

Jumel is a surname. Notable people with the surname include:

- Betty Jumel (1901–1990), British variety hall entertainer and actress
- Eliza Jumel (1775–1865), American socialite
- Sébastien Jumel (born 1971), French politician
