= Dodging the Dole =

1936 British film by John E. Blakeley

- Directed by: John E. Blakeley
- Written by: Arthur Mertz
- Produced by: John E. Blakeley
- Starring: Roy Barbour; Dan Young; Jenny Howard; Barry K. Barnes
- Production company: Mancunian Films
- Distributed by: Mancunian Films
- Release date: July 1936
- Running time: 95 minutes
- Country: United Kingdom
- Language: English

Dodging the Dole is a 1936 British musical comedy film directed by John E. Blakeley and starring Roy Barbour, Dan Young and Jenny Howard. It was made by Mancunian Films at Highbury Studios and Southall Studios.

== Synopsis ==
An exasperated clerk at a labour exchange tries to find jobs for two idle scroungers.

== Cast ==
- Roy Barbour – The Simplicity of Genius
- Dan Young – The Charming Fool
- Jenny Howard – The Generator of Electric Radiance
- Barry K. Barnes – The Dole Dodger
- Fred Walmsley – The Lancashire Favourite
- Tot Sloan – The Little Bundle of Fun
- Bertha Ricardo – Dainty and Demure

== Bibliography ==
- Low, Rachael. Filmmaking in 1930s Britain. George Allen & Unwin, 1985.
- Wood, Linda. British Films, 1927-1939. British Film Institute, 1986.
