= Jimmy James (comedian) =

English comedian and actor (1892–1965)

- Born: James Casey; 20 May 1892; Portrack, Stockton-on-Tees, County Durham, England
- Died: 4 August 1965 (aged 73); Blackpool, Lancashire, England
- Occupations: Music hall, stage, film, radio and television comedian and comedy actor
- Spouse(s): Isabelle Darby, son James Casey

Jimmy James (born James Casey; 20 May 1892 – 4 August 1965) was an English music hall, film, radio and television comedian and comedy actor. James had limited use for jokes as such, preferring to say things in a humorous manner, sometimes in surreal situations and as such was seen by some as well ahead of his time. He was often hailed as a "comedians' comedian".

== Biographical details ==
He was born as James Casey on 20 May 1892, the eldest of four sons of Jeremiah Casey, an iron puddler or steelmaker, and Polly Gartland. Many sources state he was born in Portrack, Stockton-on-Tees, although other sources consider that he was born in South Bank, Middlesbrough, and moved to Stockton-on-Tees at the age of seven in 1899. At the age of ten he won a boy soprano contest at the Stockton Hippodrome and shortly afterwards ran away, hitching a ride to Darlington to join a travelling show. The police located him a few years later at the age of twelve by which time he had become a seasoned performer. His father, an amateur clog dancer himself, encouraged his son's show business talents.

At the Sunderland Empire James met Isabelle Darby, a music hall dancer and they married in 1921; they had one son, James Casey junior.

Although James appeared on stage as a convincing drunk, often with a cigar or cigarette in his mouth, he was teetotal and did not smoke off stage. His weaknesses were gambling and his famed generosity which may account for his declared bankruptcies in 1936, 1955 and 1963.

James was last on stage in 1964, retiring that year. He died in Blackpool of pulmonary congestion on 4 August 1965 following a heart attack and is buried in Oxbridge Cemetery, Stockton-on-Tees. Interviewed by Marty Feldman in the late 1960s, comedian Eric Morecambe spoke in glowing terms about James:

He had that thing that broke all barriers with an audience. He was loved by the pros – professionals – and loved by the audience. Now Jimmy had this fantastic gift, that he was liked and loved – this is an important word – was loved – by both. One of the few comedians that all the comics used to stand on the side and watch. One of the greats.

Jimmy James's son James Casey (1922–2011) was a radio light entertainment producer at the BBC in Manchester, writing and producing shows including The Clitheroe Kid starring Jimmy Clitheroe, The Ken Dodd Show, Listen to Les starring Les Dawson, and The Enchanting World of Hinge and Bracket.

== Career ==
James began his stage career in 1904, joining Willy Netta's Singing Jockeys, a singing group, as "Terry, the blue-eyed Irish boy" with popular songs of the day and gained experience with a number of other juvenile troupes. In the First World War 1914 to 1918 James was a sergeant in the Northumberland Fusiliers but was invalided out after being gassed on the Western Front.

James appeared in Stockton as a double act with his great uncle Jimmy Howells and they were known as The Two Jimmies.

James became a comedian by chance. In 1925, he took over for one night at Longton, Stoke-on-Trent, standing in when the regular comedian walked out. His next big break came when he took over from a young Max Miller who had walked out of a show. In 1929, James was talent spotted at the Sunderland Empire by impresario George Black, taken to London and by 1930 he was appearing at the London Palladium, earning £100 a week and he also appeared at the London Coliseum.

In the 1940s, James developed one of the funniest stage routines in variety history with his two stooges, Bretton Woods, later known as Eli Woods, "Our Eli", and Hutton Conyers, played by members of the Casey family and more famously from 1956 to 1959 by a young Roy Castle. Eli Woods's real name was Jack Casey and he was James's nephew. Bretton Woods was named after the ski resort near Mount Washington, New Hampshire, USA, that gave its name to a United Nations Monetary and Financial Conference resulting in the Bretton Woods Agreement during July 1944. James named the character of Hutton Conyers after seeing a signpost on the Great North Road to the small village of Hutton Conyers, north-east of Ripon in Yorkshire.

=== Film ===
In James's first film for Mancunian Films in 1950, he starred with Norman Evans in Over the Garden Wall with Evans playing the role of his wife. His second film was Those People Next Door where he and Eli reprise James's drunk routine.

=== Stage ===
With his act James toured the musical halls, theatres and clubs around the country. He appeared at the Royal Variety Performance in 1953 and stole the show with his routine The Chipster—a lecture on the occupational hazards of preparing chips.

While at Barnsley Catholic Club James found Bernard Manning an agent, who was able to find him a job as a singer with a band.

=== Radio ===
In 1952, James starred on BBC radio in, firstly, the comedy series Don't Spare the Horses and, subsequently, in 1954 in the comedy series The Mayor's Parlour which was written for him by his son in collaboration with Frank Roscoe.

=== Television ===
In 1956, James appeared on television in his own series, Home James, and Meet the Champ in 1960 as a boxing promoter, as well as making appearances in many TV programmes including the Billy Cotton Band Show, Northern Showground (1956), Showtime (1959–61), Comedy Bandbox (1962–63) and Saturday Bandbox (1962).

== James's main sketches ==
- The drunk sketch—a variant of this appeared in the film Over the Garden Wall.
- The shoebox or Elephant-in-the-box routine.
- The chipster sketch—a lecture on the occupational hazards of preparing chips.

== Filmography ==
- Stars on Parade (1936) as himself.
- Those People Next Door (1953) as Joe Lawton starring Jack Warner and with Eli Woods.
- Over the Garden Wall (1950) with Norman Evans and Eli Woods.
