= Under New Management =

- Directed by: John E. Blakeley
- Written by: Story And Scenario: Roney Parsons; Anthony Toner; Comedy Sequences devised & arranged by: Arthur Mertz
- Produced by: John E. Blakeley
- Starring: Nat Jackley; Norman Evans; Dan Young; Betty Jumel; Nicolette Roeg
- Cinematography: Geoffrey Faithfull
- Edited by: V. Sagovsky
- Music by: Percival Mackey
- Production company: Mancunian Films
- Distributed by: Butcher's Film Service (U.K.)
- Release date: 25 May 1946 (U.K.)
- Running time: 90 minutes
- Country: United Kingdom
- Language: English

Under New Management (also known as Honeymoon Hotel) is a 1946 British comedy film directed by John E. Blakeley and starring Nat Jackley, Norman Evans and Dan Young. It was written by Roney Parsons and Blakeley (as Anthony Toner).

The screenplay concerns a chimney sweep inherits a hotel and calls on a number of ex-army friends to staff it. The film was one of a number of films at the time dealing with the contemporary issue of demobilisation following the end of the Second World War.

== Plot ==
Chimney sweep Joe inherits a dilapidated hotel which, with the help of former army chums as staff, he starts to turn around. A pair of devious property developers however, attempt to buy the hotel from him, knowing that the land is due to be redeveloped, and to increase in value when an airport is built nearby.

== Cast ==
- Nat Jackley as Nat
- Norman Evans as Joe Evans
- Dan Young as Dan
- Betty Jumel as Betty
- Nicolette Roeg as Brenda Evans
- Cavan O'Connor as the strolling vagabond
- Michael Taylor as Reg Allen
- Tony Dalton as Tony
- Marianne Lincoln as Marianne
- Bunty Meadows as Bunty
- Lynda Ross as speciality act
- John Rorke as Father Flannery
- Aubrey Mallalieu as John Marshall
- G. H. Mulcaster as William Barclay
- Babs Valerie as bride
- Hay Petrie as bridegroom
- Lily Lapidus as hotel guest
- Gordon McLeod as Mr. Allen
- Joss Ambler as hotel manager
- David Keir as Colonel
- John Allen as Norman Wade
- Dick Beamish as hotel servant
- Arthur Wollum as hotel servant
- Donovan Octette as speciality act
- Mendel's Female Sextette as speciality act
- Percival Mackey Orchestra as themselves

== Reception ==
The Monthly Film Bulletin wrote: "The film is rather long-drawn out and over-acting by the principals often makes the comedy seem rather forced."

Kine Weekly wrote: "Fruity slapstick comedy ... An elaborate benefit concert featuring Cavan O'Connor and other turns, sandwiched between the breezy knockout fooling and the pleasing vocal asides help mellow the film's ripe, not to say ribald, gags and lines. Norman Evans's 'visit to the Dentist' sketch is one of the comedy highlights. Towards the finish the fun thins a little but in spite of its crazy continuity and hefty footage, the show is good music hall."

Picturegoer wrote: "Slapstick comedy dealing with ex-Serviceman who, in spite of the activities of a crooked solicitor, put a de-requisitioned hotel on its feet. It's broad in its humour and contains a number of well-known music-hall turns, including the Strolling Vagabond. Boiled down to essentials, it is actually a celluloid music-hall show, with all the cast working hard to make a success of their various turns."

== Bibliography ==
- Mundy, John. The British musical film. Manchester University Press, 2007.
