= Dan Young =

British comedian (1899–1970)

Daniel Daly Young (19 April 1899 – 1970) was a British comedian and film actor. He featured in a number of Mancunian Films productions often appearing with Frank Randle.

== Selected filmography ==
- Dodging the Dole (1936)
- Calling All Crooks (1938)
- Somewhere in England (1940)
- Somewhere in Camp (1942)
- Somewhere on Leave (1943)
- Demobbed (1944)
- Under New Management (1946)
- Holidays with Pay (1948)
- Cup-tie Honeymoon (1948)
- School for Randle (1949)
- Over the Garden Wall (1950)
- It's a Grand Life (1953)
