= Demobbed (1944 film) =

British comedy by John E. Blakeley

- Directed by: John E. Blakeley
- Written by: Story and scenario: Roney Parsons; Anthony Toner original story: Julian Cantor; Max Zorlini comedy sequences devised and arranged by: Arthur Mertz
- Produced by: F.W. Baker; John E. Blakeley
- Starring: Norman Evans; Nat Jackley; Dan Young; Betty Jumel
- Cinematography: Geoffrey Faithfull
- Edited by: Ted Richards
- Music by: Percival Mackey
- Production companies: Mancunian Films & Butcher's Film Service (co-production)
- Distributed by: Butcher's Film Service (U.K.)
- Release date: 19 June 1944 (U.K.)
- Running time: 96 minutes
- Country: United Kingdom
- Language: English

Demobbed is a 1944 British comedy film directed by John E. Blakeley and starring Norman Evans, Nat Jackley, Gus McNaughton and Dan Young. It was written by Roney Parsons and Anthony Toner from an original story by Julian Cantor and Max Zorlini.

== Plot ==
A group of demobbed ex-soldiers find work at a company that makes scientific instruments. When things start to go missing, Norma, a company secretary, enlists their help in tracking down the thieves.

== Cast ==
- Norman Evans as Norman
- Nat Jackley as Nat
- Dan Young as Dan
- Betty Jumel as Betty
- Tony Dalton as Billy Brown
- Jimmy Plant as Graham
- George Merritt as James Bentley
- Fred Kitchen as Black
- Arthur Hambling as Curtis
- Gus McNaughton as Capt. Gregson
- Marianne Lincoln as Marianne
- Anne Firth as Norma Deane
- Neville Mapp as John Bentley
- Webster Booth as himself
- Anne Ziegler as herself
- Sydney Bromley as BBC announcer
- Kay Lewis as Norman Evan's partner
- Freddie Watts as landlord of the Red Lion
- Edgar Driver as the bookie
- Noel Dainton as Police Inspector
- Marjorie Gresley as the mother
- Angela Glynne as the child

== Critical reception ==
The Monthly Film Bulletin wrote: "The film might prove amusing to those who like music-hall turns, a Hawaiian dance being quite funny, but during some of the other acts the humour is so grotesque as to make one feel quite uncomfortable."

Kine Weekly wrote: "Rowdy, good-humonured musical comedy burlesque covering the hectic misadventures of four crazy ex-privates in Civvy Street. There is not much of a plot, but the principal comedians make a lively and versatile team, the well-timed music and dance-hall sequences are bright, the climax carries a kick and the technical presentation is above reproach. ... True, the mixture of slapstick, song and music-hall is occasionally rough and ready, but enthusiastic teamwork and first class technical presentation, nevertheless, permit the whole to merge into good-hearted, entertainment-filled comedy burlesque."

TV Guide called it an "Occasionally okay slapstick comedy."
