= Love's a Luxury =

1952 British film

- Directed by: Francis Searle
- Written by: Edward V. Hole (play); Guy Paxton (play); Elwyn Ambrose; Hugh Wakefield
- Produced by: Tom Blakeley
- Starring: Hugh Wakefield; Derek Bond; Michael Medwin
- Cinematography: Ernest Palmer
- Edited by: Dorothy Stimson
- Production company: Mancunian Films
- Distributed by: Mancunian Films
- Release date: 15 December 1952
- Running time: 89 minutes
- Country: United Kingdom
- Language: English

Love's a Luxury, also known as The Caretaker's Daughter, is a 1952 British second feature comedy film directed by Francis Searle and starring Hugh Wakefield, Derek Bond and Michael Medwin. It was written by Elwyn Ambrose and Hugh Wakefield based on the stage play of the same name by Edward Hole and Guy Paxton, and was made by the Manchester-based Mancunian Films.

== Plot ==
A theatre producer and an actor try and have a quiet week in a country cottage. Their efforts are thwarted by the arrival of a variety of wives, girlfriends and scoutmasters.

== Cast ==
- Hugh Wakefield as Charles Pentwick
- Derek Bond as Robert Bentley
- Michael Medwin as Dick Pentwick
- Helen Shingler as Mrs. Pentwick
- Zena Marshall as Fritzi Villiers
- Bill Shine as Clarence Mole
- Patricia Raine as Molly Harris
- Grace Arnold as Mrs. Harris

== Critical reception ==
Monthly Film Bulletin said "An absurd farce, with impersonations, misunderstandings and dressing-ups galore; people who find these funny will no doubt find them funny."

Kine Weekly wrote: "Adapted from a stage play, it contains everything from straight comedy to slapstick and female impersonation, but hard as Its popular principal players strive, they are unable completely to conceal its lack of originality and brevity. Lively in parts, but uneven as a whole, it should nevertheless tickle suburban, provincial and industrial fans. Its basic formula always has."

In British Sound Films: The Studio Years 1928–1959 David Quinlan rated the film as "mediocre", writing: "Typically long and hoary Mancunian farce."
