= School for Randle =

1949 British film by John E. Blakeley

- Directed by: John E. Blakeley
- Written by: Harry Jackson; Frank Randle; John E. Blakeley
- Produced by: John E. Blakeley
- Starring: Frank Randle; Dan Young; Alec Pleon; Terry Randall
- Cinematography: Ernest Palmer
- Edited by: Dorothy Stimson
- Music by: Fred Harris
- Production company: Mancunian Films
- Distributed by: Mancunian Films
- Release date: 1949
- Running time: 89 minutes
- Country: United Kingdom
- Language: English

School for Randle is a 1949 British comedy film directed by John E. Blakeley and starring Frank Randle, Dan Young and Alec Pleon. It was written by Randle, Harry Jackson and Blakeley. It was made at the Manchester Studios, and was one of a string of cheaply made and profitable films starring Randle during the era. The title is a reference to the Richard Brinsley Sheridan play The School for Scandal.

A school caretaker turns out to be the father of one of the pupils.

== Plot ==
Former Music-Hall act "Flatfoot" Mason is caretaker at a school where one of the pupils, and unbeknownst to her, is his daughter, Betty; who was put up for adoption when his wife died. She is now a teenager and this causes concern, as the staff feel "Flatfoot" is being over attentive to her. Told to pay her less attention, "Flatfoot" reluctantly obeys, but Betty thinks he's rejecting her and decides to run away to make her name in show business. Along with fellow caretakers, "Flatfoot" tracks her down to a seedy cabaret club. In disguise as a Chinese acrobatic troupe, "The Three Who Flungs", "Flatfoot" and friends attempt to persuade Betty to come home.

== Cast ==
- Frank Randle as "Flatfoot" Mason
- Dan Young as Clarence
- Alec Pleon as Blockhead
- Terry Randall as Betty Andrews
- Hilda Bayley as Mrs. Andrews
- Frederick Bradshaw as Mr. Andrews
- Jimmy Clitheroe as Jimmy
- Maudie Edwards as Bella Donna
- John Singer as Ted Parker
- Elsa Tee as Miss Weston

== Critical reception ==
Kine Weekly wrote: "The story is too negligible to be taken seriously, and one must accept the almost pantomime atmosphere and expect little else. If may be recommended mainly for patrons in northern and industrial areas. ... The story provides a scrappy background for the antics of the three comedians, much of whose humour is of the pie-in-the-eye variety. Chief drawback is the film's ambitious length."

In British Sound Films: The Studio Years 1928–1959 David Quinlan rated the film as "average", writing: "Usual Randle slapstick antics; some good belly-laughs, but on the longish side."
