= Betty Jumel =

British entertainer and actress (1901–1990)

- Norman Evans, Betty Jumel & Terry-Thomas in London Palladium's Humpty Dumpty (1951)
- Born: Amy Ada Beatrice Grimshaw; 5 May 1901; Fairhaven, Lytham St Annes, Lancashire, England
- Died: 14 October 1990 (aged 89); Hove, Sussex, England
- Occupation(s): Variety hall and film entertainer
- Spouses: Victor Arnley (m. 1926; died 1949) Giuseppe ("Bill") Castagnoli (m. 1956; died 1971)

Betty Jumel (5 May 1901 – 14 October 1990) was a British variety hall entertainer and actress.

== Early life ==
Betty Jumel was born Amy Ada Beatrice Grimshaw in Fairhaven, Lytham St Annes, Lancashire in 1901. She was only 10 years old when she made her first stage appearance, alongside her father Harold Jumel, who toured an act round the music halls entitled The Four Jumels. Her father taught her to sing and dance, as well as how to best throw her voice – almost from her infancy. When the family disbanded before the First World War, the young Betty Jumel joined her father's double act, in which her main role was to play the piano, dance and sing.

Fairly pretty and very small for her age, Jumel made the most of her youthful look and often wore a lace dress and ringlets during performances – which completed her girlish features. When her father enlisted, Jumel became a soubrette working in end-of-pier variety shows in the North of England.

== On her own ==
With already a wealth of experience behind her, Jumel created her own comedy material, notably three solo turns under the heading A Bundle of Fun. In one of these scenarios, she played a fairy in a take-off of the ballet Swan Lake. In others she used her singing talent to comedy effect as an opera singer, or a concert pianist whose only ability was to play only the wrong notes. Becoming successful in her own right, it was not long before other performers eventually persuaded her to let them join her – and consequently, she appeared on a number of occasions with the gangling and ungainly Nat Jackley in a much-loved turn called 'At the Ball'. Jackley's angular body contrasted marvellously with Jumel's small figure in an overtight ball gown, which was split up one side to reveal her funny, wafer-thin legs. In 1959 she appeared in an early broadcast on the very long running BBC TV programme, The Good Old Days, performing a chaotic routine as an Opera singer in a theatrical costume which fell apart while she fell about the stage in the time honoured tradition of music hall.

Jumel spent her life on tour in variety halls. She was known for her unfailing instinct for the mildly grotesque, as she interrupted herself during a piano recital, or took a drink of water from a vase of wilting flowers. Over more than half a century of performing her craft resulted in her simple, but brilliantly timed acts making her renowned wherever she went. Such was her comic timing that she also appeared in pantomimes in the winter and concert parties in the summer.

== Success ==
Her first West End appearance was a Lyceum review Good Company in 1933 by Albert Burdon and Dan Leno Jnr. and during the Second World War she entertained the forces with ENSA in Egypt.

She appeared in a number of films in the 1940s, appearing alongside Will Hay, Sandy Powell and Norman Evans. She also appeared in pantomime with Evans in Humpty Dumpty which was so successful that it ran from Christmas Eve to Easter. She and Evans also paired up for a radio series Good Evans.

== Personal life ==
Betty Jumel was married, first to Victor, one of the Arnley Brothers – who performed a variety act in the 1920s. Their daughter Georgina, broke with family tradition by becoming a legitimate actress. Some years after the death of her first husband, she married an Italian acrobat Bill Castagnoli, who predeceased her.

Her daughter, actress Georgina Victoria Symondson, (known professionally as Georgina Jumel), married actor Terence Morgan, on the 23rd. of March 1947, in Westminster Register Office. They had one daughter, Lyvia Lee Morgan.

The comedienne who was billed as 'The Bundle of Fun', and one of the last survivors of the variety halls, died in 1990 at the age of 89.

== Filmography ==
- Demobbed (1944)
- Under New Management (1946)
- Cup-tie Honeymoon (1948)
