= Holidays with Pay =

1948 film by John E. Blakeley

- Directed by: John E. Blakeley
- Written by: Frank Randle; John E. Blakeley; Mavis Compston; Harry Jackson
- Produced by: John E. Blakeley
- Starring: Frank Randle; Tessie O'Shea; Dan Young; Josef Locke
- Cinematography: Ben R. Hart
- Edited by: Dorothy Stimson
- Music by: Albert W. Stanbury
- Production company: Mancunian Films
- Distributed by: Butcher's Film Service
- Release date: 1948
- Running time: 95 minutes
- Country: United Kingdom
- Language: English

Holidays with Pay is a 1948 British second feature ('B') comedy film directed by John E. Blakeley and starring Frank Randle, Tessie O'Shea and Dan Young. It was written by Randle, Blakeley, Mavis Compston and Harry Jackson. The film follows the Rogers family as they go on holiday to Blackpool and enjoy a series of adventures.

== Plot ==
The Rogers family visit Blackpool for their annual holidays, and have difficulty finding rooms; but are befriended by a wealthy young man who takes them to stay in his haunted mansion. The family become entangled in a plot by the young man's grasping cousin to murder him for the family inheritance. However, all ends happily with the young man marrying the Rogers eldest daughter, Pamela.

== Cast ==
- Frank Randle as Jack Rogers
- Tessie O'Shea as Pansy Rogers
- Dan Young as Phil Rogers
- Josef Locke as himself
- Sally Barnes as Pamela Rogers
- Sonny Burke as Michael Sandford
- Bert Tracy as Ephraim Rogers
- Joyanne Bracewell as Joyanne Rogers

== Critical reception ==
The Monthly Film Bulletin wrote: "The story, giving a cross-section of British life, has possibilities, but is far too long. As at present shown, however, there is too much padding, and the story is stretched so that it seems nothing but a peg on which to hang a series of cross-talk acts indulged in on the slightest provocation by the three stars. The humour is of the slapstick, rough-and-ready kind which is unlikely to appeal, at least in such over-generous doses, to sophisticated audiences."

Kine Weekly wrote: "Riotous in places, it has everything to gain by drastic pruning."

The Spinning Image wrote: "The film as a whole is more cheap than cheerful. What makes it worthwhile is seeing the energy of Randle when he is allowed free-rein. He must have been able to work a theatre audience brilliantly by the flash of an eye or a knowing grin. It's a great pity that his performances haven't been better preserved for posterity (we have only one sound recording of him working live in 1938)."
