= Norman Evans =

British actor (1901–1962)

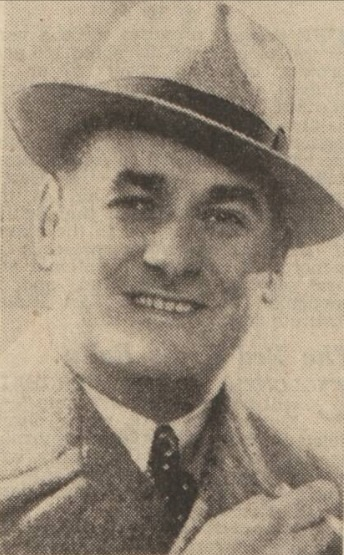
- From the Daily Mail, 21 July 1939
- Born: 11 June 1901; Rochdale, Lancashire, England
- Died: 25 November 1962 (aged 61); Blackpool, Lancashire
- Occupation: Comedian

Norman Evans' grave, Blackpool

Norman Evans (11 June 1901 – 25 November 1962) was an English stage and radio comedian, best remembered for his sketches and programmes entitled "Over the Garden Wall".

== Biography ==
Evans was born in Rochdale, Lancashire, and started his working life as a commercial traveller, while also taking part in amateur dramatic groups. He gained a local reputation for his after-dinner speeches, and decided to become an entertainer, initially appearing at local functions and concert parties. In 1934 he was reportedly discovered by fellow Rochdale entertainer Gracie Fields, though in fact he had already been seen by impresario Oswald Stoll. He had his first London appearance alongside a young Betty Driver, and gained a place on national variety tours, where he was an immediate success. According to writer Michael Kilgarriff, his "broad boisterous comedy and warmth of personality swiftly elevated him to lasting stardom."

The act for which he is best remembered was "Over the Garden Wall", in which he played Fanny Fairbottom, a toothless hatchet-faced Lancastrian housewife gossiping over a garden wall. The caricature was reportedly based on his mother. The one-sided conversations would embrace local gossip, including scandal about the neighbours and personal medical complaints, including silently mouthing words deemed too rude to be spoken out loud, and accompanied with a range of facial contortions and glances round for supposed eavesdroppers.

The routine provided the basis for a BBC radio series, Over the Garden Wall (at first called Meet Our Joe), broadcast in three series, in 1942, 1948, and 1949/50, in which Betty Jumel played the part of his neighbour, and for several films including one of the same title in which Jimmy James played the part of Evans' husband. It was also the inspiration for Les Dawson and Roy Barraclough's later Cissie and Ada characters. Another famous stage sketch was "The Dentist" in which Evans played both patient and dentist, and in which he employed a large screen through which only silhouettes could be seen.

Evans became a very popular pantomime dame, considered to be "the greatest... since Dan Leno", and was the only one in that role to receive top billing at the London Palladium. He also toured with a stage show, "Good Evans", and made the first of a successful series of U.S. appearances in New York in 1949, followed by a season at the El Capitan Theatre in Hollywood the following year and an appearance on the Ed Sullivan Show. He made three appearances in Royal Variety Performances, in 1937, 1947, and 1951.

In May 1955, Evans lost his right eye in a serious car accident while driving near Preston. The accident was caused after he swerved trying to avoid a black cat. Despite the accident, he had his first television series, Saturday Comedy Hour, in 1956. His final summer season was at Butlin's Holiday Camp, Pwllheli in 1962. He wrote to Clarkson Rose, another top pantomime dame: "Working in a Butlin theatre is a terrific experience, and although I've not been too well, I've never been happier in my life".

Norman Evans died in November 1962, in Blackpool, and is buried in Carleton Cemetery. The headstone of his grave is a low wall built from natural gritstone blocks. His epitaph (preceding birth and death dates) reads "His last garden wall".

== Filmography ==
- Demobbed (1944)
- Under New Management (1946)
- The Calendar (1948)
- Over the Garden Wall (1950)
