= Longsight Free Christian Church =

Historical Unitarian chapel

Coordinates: 53.4596°N 2.2047°W

Longsight Free Christian Church was a Unitarian chapel, located in Longsight, Manchester, at the junction of Plymouth Grove and Birch Lane.

== History ==
The foundation stone was laid on 23 September 1882 by the Reverend William Gaskell.

The church was opened on 7 June 1883, having been built at a cost of £3,000. The Reverend William Gaskell conducted the opening ceremony. The architecture of the church was in the early English Gothic style. The exterior walls were built of grey stone with Yorkshire stone dressings. The eastern wall of the church facing Birch Lane, featured a large stained glass window dedicated to the memory of John Ashton Nicholls. The architect was William Telford Gunson.

== Later history ==
The church was closed in 1948, after which the building was sold to the BBC and converted into a garage for outside broadcast unit vehicles. The BBC used the building until the 1970s. The church has since been demolished.

== See also ==
- Dickenson Road Studios
