= Nat Jackley =

English comic actor (1909–1988)

- Born: Nathaniel Tristram Jackley Hirsch; 16 July 1909; Sunderland, England
- Died: 17 September 1988 (aged 79); Coventry, England
- Occupations: Actor, entertainer
- Years active: 1944–1987
- Spouses: Hazel Roberts (m. 1933) Marianne Lincoln (m. 1949) Pamela Rushworth (m. 1979)
- Relatives: Mary Lee (sister-in-law)

Nat Jackley (born Nathaniel Tristram Jackley Hirsch; 16 July 1909 – 17 September 1988) was an English comic actor who starred in revue, variety, film and pantomime from the 1920s to the mid-1980s. His trademark rubber-neck dance, skeletal frame and peculiar speech impediment made him a formidable and funny comedian and pantomime dame. His later years were spent as a character actor in film and television, and appearing in pantomime. Jackley appeared in three Royal Variety shows, topping the bill in summer shows throughout Britain's seaside resorts and in London.

== Early life ==
A native of Sunderland, he was born into a theatrical family. His father George Jackley (1885–1950) was a comic actor who was the leading comedian for the Melville Brothers at the Lyceum Theatre during the interwar years. George himself was the son of Nathan Jackley who, with his own troupe, The Jackley Wonders, performed in circuses throughout Europe and the United States. Nat's brother David was an actor, while another brother, Ronald, performed in variety with his wife, singer Mary Lee. Nat began his showbusiness career at the age of eight, in the circus.

Upon leaving school, Jackley worked as a seed packer, later recalling: "I'd just left school and I had an idea I wasn't going to be any good in show business, so I went as a dispatch clerk for a seed firm. I used to have to supply all these farms with seed potatoes and things. One farm wanted a lorryload of seed potatoes and then a lady got on wanting just one packet of polyanthas narcissi. Well, I got the addresses mixed up and the woman got the lorryload of seed potatoes and the farm got the flower seeds and I got the sack. So I went back on the stage again."

== Career ==
Nat Jackley began his career in the 1920s as a double act with his sister Joy, and later joined The Eight Lancashire Lads. He teamed up as the 'straight man' to comedian Jack Clifford, but they later swapped roles. In addition to his first wife, he worked with several other feeds, but ultimately made his career as a headlining solo comedian. Like many artists of the time, he entertained troops during World War II.

In 1950, Jackley appeared on television in the programme The Symbol of Entertainment Supreme, consisting of extracts from shows running in Blackpool at the time, including the revue Out of this World, which he was appearing in at the Opera House. Although he made many appearances on radio and television, the only time Jackley had his own show on television was with the pair of specials Nat's in the Belfry on BBC TV in 1956. The same year, he appeared in the musical variety film Stars in Your Eyes, co-starring with Pat Kirkwood and Bonar Colleano. In 1957, he appeared in a film for television, Revels of 1957, which again gathered together sections of contemporary Blackpool.

Jackley appeared on television in The Beatles' Magical Mystery Tour film in 1967 as Happy Nat the Rubber Man. A scene in which he featured did not make the final cut, and he appears only in a non-speaking role as a passenger on the coach, but his name does appear in the end credits. In the latter stages of his career, he became a character actor, appearing in such films as The Ploughman's Lunch (1984). Other later credits included Jingle Bells (a Play for Today) (1973), the one-off Thames special Bentine (1975), Angels (1976), Victoria Wood's Talent (1979), The Spoils of War (1980), Tales of the Unexpected, A Midsummer Night's Dream, as Snout, The Old Boy Network as himself, Dancing Country, a 1981 BBC2 Playhouse presentation, The Chinese Detective (1982), Juliet Bravo (1983), Threads (1984), Dramarama and Minder (both 1985), and Lizzie's Pictures (1987).

In 1978, Jackley had his first record released, on which he sang two of his own songs, "Kiss Me Underneath The Mistletoe" and "Wave To Me".

He appeared in some fifty pantomimes, the last being in Newcastle in 1980. He was subsequently the subject of the television programme This Is Your Life on 10 April 1980. He was surprised by presenter Eamonn Andrews at Euston station in London. Amongst those paying tribute to Jackley were Dickie Henderson, Tessie O'Shea and Beryl Reid.

== Personal life and death ==
Jackley was married three times. His first wife was Hazel Roberts, whom he married in Stoke Newington in 1933. In 1949, Jackley married Marianne Lincoln in Marylebone, London. She was a scriptwriter, providing some of his material, and became his comedy foil. Author and actor Michael Kilgarriff later wrote of Jackley that he was "one of the sweetest-natured men we have ever encountered". Commenting on his marriage to Lincoln, he wrote, "How sad it was, during our pantomime run at the New Cardiff, to see the distress and embarrassment caused this artiste by his abusive and violent first wife, Marianne Lincoln, who at the Palace Pier Theatre, Brighton, pushed her husband down the stairs. Eventually, the ex-soubrette's alcoholic disruptiveness caused her to be banned both from the theatre and the local hostelry, a not infrequent occurrence wherever her unfortunate spouse was playing. One management wouldn't even have Mrs Jackley in the same town."

His third and final marriage to Pamela Rushworth proved to be happier, with the couple settling in Coventry, Warwickshire, where they were married in 1979.

Jackley was a member of the Freemasons. He died of cancer in Coventry, two months after his 79th birthday.

== Stage appearances ==
- Jack and the Beanstalk (1974), pantomime at the Bradford Alhambra with Charlie Drake and Jack Smethurst
- Mother Goose (1975), pantomime at the Hull New Theatre
- Babes in the Wood (1960), pantomime at the Empire Palace, Leeds
- This'll Make You Laugh (1956), revue with Tessie O'Shea, Sabrina and Arthur Worsley
- Singing in the Reign (1952), summer revue at the Queen's Theatre, Blackpool with Josef Locke
- Aladdin (1951), pantomime at the London Casino with Jean Carson and Julie Andrews
- The Third Annual 'Latin Quarter' Revue (1951), revue at the London Casino with Jean Carson
- Off The Record (1950), revue at the Victoria Palace Theatre, London with Eddie Calvert and Arthur Worsley
- Out of this World (1948), revue at the London Palladium with Frankie Howerd and Binnie Hale, later at the Opera House, Blackpool
- High Time (1946), revue at the London Palladium

== Filmography ==
- Return to Waterloo (1985) as Old Soldier
- Threads (1984) as Man in Graveyard
- The Ploughman's Lunch (1983) as Mr. Penfield
- Yanks (1979) as Postman
- Mrs. Brown, You've Got a Lovely Daughter (1968) as Pub Singer
- Magical Mystery Tour (1967) as The Rubber Man
- Stars in Your Eyes (1956), as Jimmy Knowles
- Under New Management (1946) (aka Honeymoon Hotel) as Nat
- Demobbed (1944) as Nat
