= Cup-tie Honeymoon =

1947 British film by John E. Blakeley

- Directed by: John E. Blakeley
- Written by: John E. Blakeley and Arthur Mertz
- Produced by: John E. Blakeley
- Starring: Sandy Powell; Dan Young; Betty Jumel; Patricia Phoenix
- Cinematography: Geoffrey Faithfull
- Edited by: Dorothy Stimson
- Distributed by: Mancunian Films
- Release date: 1947
- Running time: 93 minutes
- Country: United Kingdom
- Language: English

Cup-tie Honeymoon is a 1947 British film directed by John E. Blakeley and starring Sandy Powell, Dan Young and Betty Jumel. It was written by Blakeley and Arthur Mertz.

== Plot summary ==
A business man's son has to choose between playing for his father's team and their rivals in a football match. He does the right thing and romantically impresses his father's secretary.

== Cast ==
- Sandy Powell as Joe Butler
- Dan Young as Cecil Alistair
- Betty Jumel as Betty
- Pat McGrath as Eric Chambers
- Violet Farebrother as Mary Chambers
- Frank Groves as Jimmy Owen
- Joyanne Bracewell as Pauline May
- Vic Arnley as grandad
- Harold Walden as himself
- Barry K. Barnes as grumpy customer
- Pat Phoenix as Mrs. Butler (credited as Patricia Pilkington)
- Bernard Youens as coalman (uncredited)
- David Edwin Vivian Coker Callan as policeman

== Production ==
Filmed in Rusholme, Manchester, much of the shooting took place on local streets and at the nearby Maine Road stadium. It was the first film to be made at the Dickenson Road Studios by the Mancunian Film Corporation.

== Reception ==
The Monthly Film Bulletin wrote: "The film covers cup ties, interspersed with song, dance and love, and there is a lot of slapstick comedy which makes the audience laugh. In fact, it is a farce pure and simple, and a rather painful one at that. Even that grand comic Violet Farebrother is unable to produce anything but indulgent smiles; and those provincial favourites Sandy Powell and Dan Young do their best with a badly constructed story."

Kine Weekly wrote: "The film is on a pretty safe pitch in dealing with football and the machinations of unscrupulous gamblers give sturdy background to its topical and crazy story. Popular romance provides the feminine touch, while the antics of Joe and the fellow inmates of his boarding house furnish most of the slapstick interludes. The humour is far from subtle, but the show is little the worse for concentrating on belly laughs. Its only real fault, and that's common to most British productions, is its length."

== Cultural impact ==
Release of the film coincided with the start of the 1947 football season.
