= Rusholme =

Area of Manchester, England

Coordinates: 53.4544°N 2.2247°W

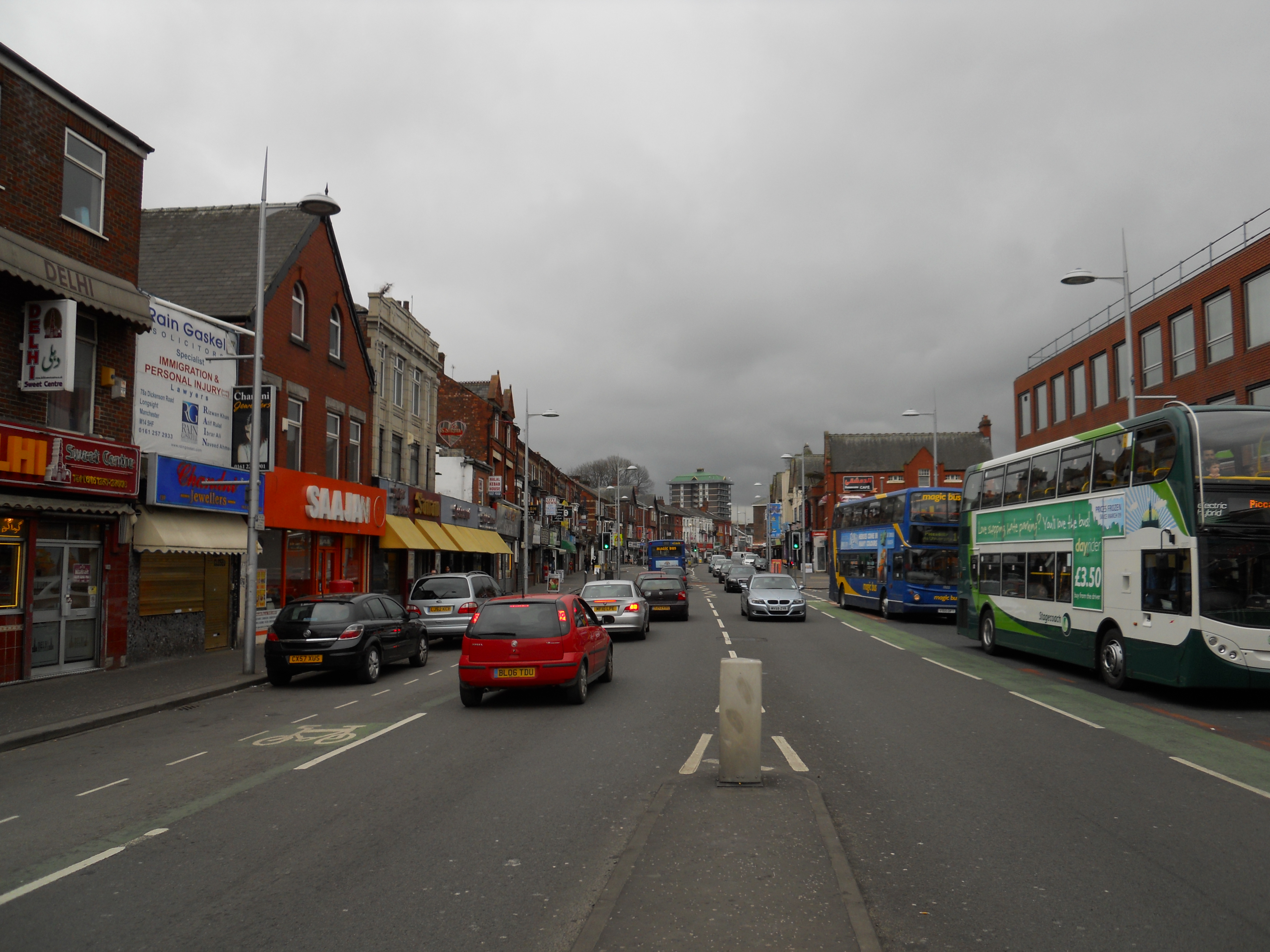
- Wilmslow Road in Rusholme

- Location within Greater Manchester
- Population: 13,643 (2011)
- OS grid reference: SJ850953
- Metropolitan borough: Manchester
- Metropolitan county: Greater Manchester
- Region: North West
- Country: England
- Sovereign state: United Kingdom
- Post town: MANCHESTER
- Postcode district: M14
- Dialling code: 0161
- Police: Greater Manchester
- Fire: Greater Manchester
- Ambulance: North West
- UK Parliament: Manchester Rusholme
- Councillors: Shams Syed (Green); Ahmed Ali (Labour); Jill Lovecy (Labour)

Rusholme (/ˈrʌʃoʊm/) is an area of Manchester, in Greater Manchester, England, two miles (three kilometres) south of the city centre. The population of the ward at the 2011 census was 13,643. Rusholme is bounded by Chorlton-on-Medlock to the north, Victoria Park and Longsight to the east, Fallowfield to the south and Moss Side to the west. It has a large student population, with several student halls and many students renting terraced houses, and suburban houses towards Victoria Park.

== History ==
=== Toponymy ===
Rusholme, unlike other place names in Manchester with the suffix ‑hulme/holme is not a true water meadow. Its name derives from ryscum, the dative plural of the Old English rysc, a "rush" meaning at the rushes. The name was recorded as Russum in 1235, Ryssham in 1316 and Rysholme in 1551.

=== Early history ===
Late in the Roman occupation of Britain, a hoard of about 200 gold coins was hidden in the valley of the Gore Brook. These date from the 2nd and 3rd centuries CE and were found where Birchfields Road crosses the brook in the 1890s. They are now held in the Manchester Museum.

The name Rusholme first appears in the mid-13th century, when "Russum" is mentioned. A house is known to have existed at Platt at that time, which was replaced by a larger one of black-and-white construction. This remained the home of the Platts until the present classical building replaced it in the mid-18th century. An early record of the Platt estate mentions the Nico Ditch, an 8th or 9th-century Anglo-Saxon linear earthwork running east–west through the area and probably marking an administrative boundary. Tales of battles between Danes and Normans associated with the road names Danes Road and Norman Road are not accepted by historians. Another black-and-white hall at Birch was probably built in the 16th century.

The south-eastern part of Rusholme around the former church of St James is known as Birch-in-Rusholme. It takes its name from the Birch family who acquired land in this area in the 12th century and built Birch Hall and a small family chapel, the Birch Chapel.

The economy of the area was dependent on agriculture until the 18th century; however during the 17th and 18th centuries there was a growth of cottage industries such as spinning, weaving and brickmaking.

=== Social history ===
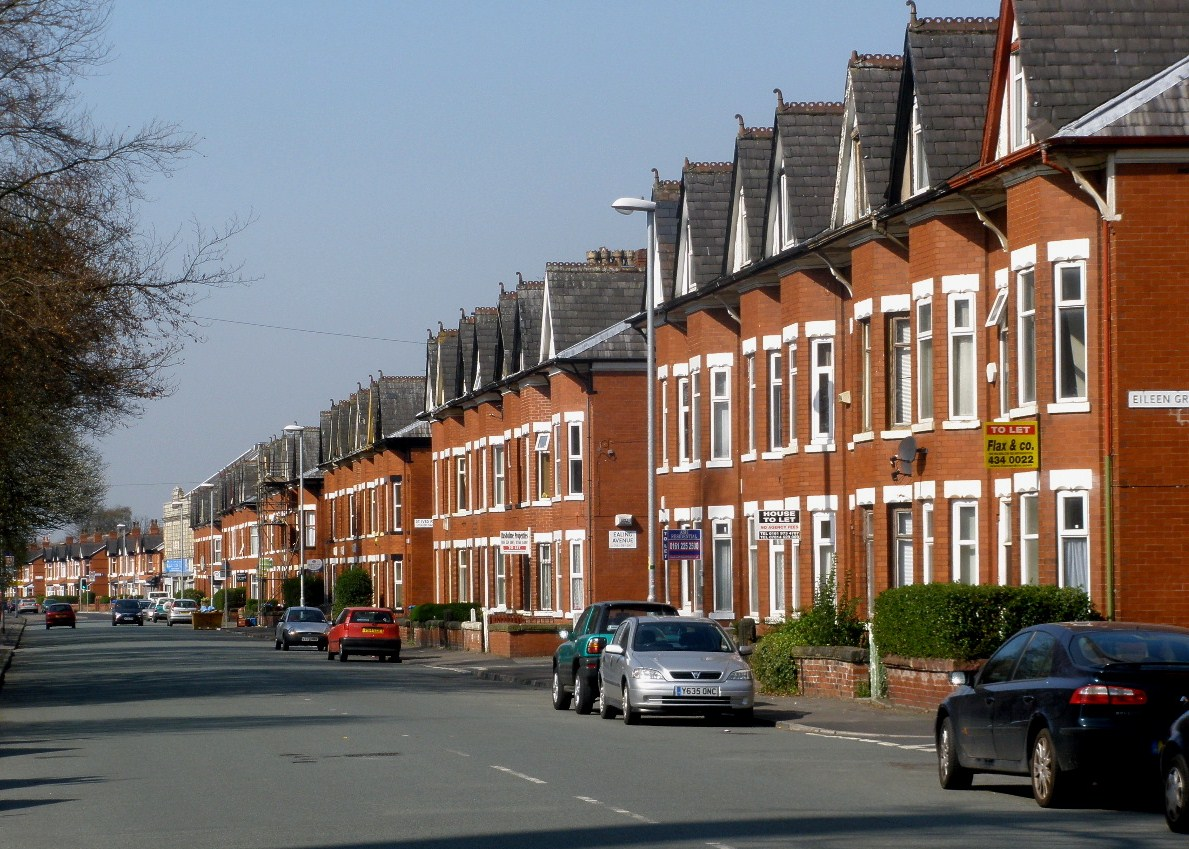
Platt Lane in Rusholme

Over the Victorian era, there were several different socio-political meanings of Rusholme. Primarily, it was a township based around a general area known as Rusholme since at least the 13th century. The area grew into a township, and by the beginning of the 19th century, it had its own government responsible for public health, roads, policing, poor relief, and other local government tasks. Rusholme was originally a politically autonomous entity, which was vital to its self-conception as a discrete area even after its incorporation into Manchester. Low-cost terraced housing built between 1880 and 1930 dominates the landscape, along with a sprawling council housing estate from the interwar period.

=== Political history ===
Richard Cobden, William Royle (author of a history of the township), and Thomas Lowe (1815–1892) were long-time residents. Lowe began working as a baker and became a flour dealer, later a nurseryman and finally the proprietor of a dairy. Prime Minister H. H. Asquith was married here in 1877 to Miss Helen Melland.

The Conservative Dame Kathleen Ollerenshaw was for 26 years one of the councillors for Rusholme on Manchester City Council, before becoming Lord Mayor of Manchester in 1975–1976. Other local politicians included ward councillor Paul Shannon, a Liberal Democrat and former deputy leader of the Manchester City Council Liberal Democrat group who was defeated by Ahmed Ali (Labour) in May 2012. Rabnawaz Akbar was elected as a Labour councillor for Rusholme ward in May 2010. Councillor Akbar served on the Citizenship and Inclusion Committee.

== Governance ==
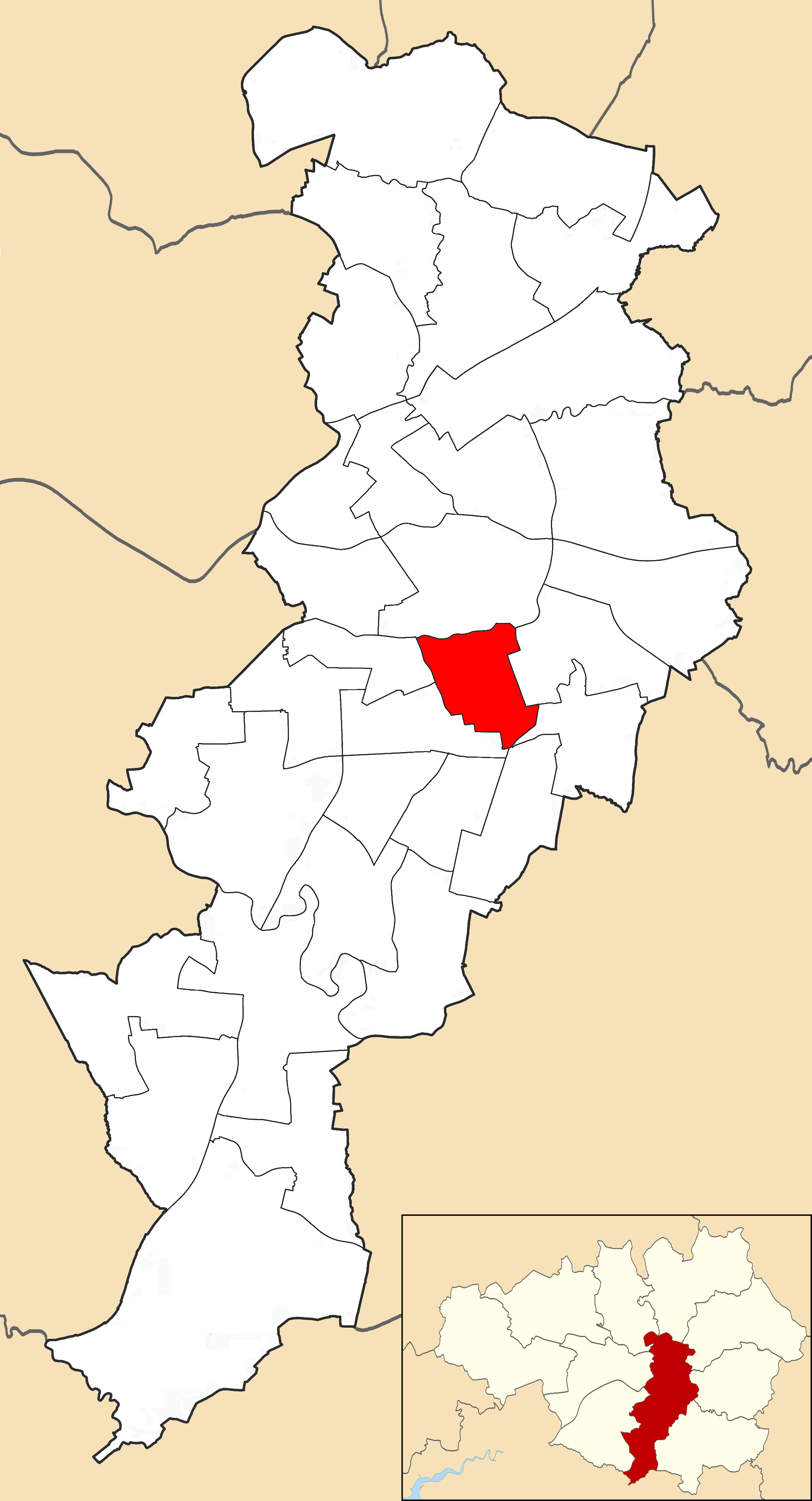
Rusholme electoral ward within Manchester City Council.

Rusholme was formerly a township in the parish of Manchester, in 1866 Rusholme became a separate civil parish, on 26 March 1896 the parish was abolished to form South Manchester. In 1891 the parish had a population of 10,696.

It is served in Westminster by the MP for Manchester Rusholme, currently Afzal Khan.

Councillors

Rusholme is represented on Manchester City Council by three councillors, Ahmed Ali (Lab), Jill Lovecy (Lab) and Shams Syed (Grn).

Election	Councillor	Councillor	Councillor
2018	Ahmed Ali (Lab)	Jill Lovecy (Lab)	Rabnawaz Akbar (Lab)
2019	Ahmed Ali (Lab)	Jill Lovecy (Lab)	Rabnawaz Akbar (Lab)
2021	Ahmed Ali (Lab)	Jill Lovecy (Lab)	Rabnawaz Akbar (Lab)
2022	Ahmed Ali (Lab)	Jill Lovecy (Lab)	Rabnawaz Akbar (Lab)
2023	Ahmed Ali (Lab)	Jill Lovecy (Lab)	Rabnawaz Akbar (Lab)
2024	Ahmed Ali (Lab)	Jill Lovecy (Lab)	Rabnawaz Akbar (Lab)
2026	Ahmed Ali (Lab)	Jill Lovecy (Lab)	Shams Syed (Grn)

indicates seat up for re-election. indicates seat won in by-election.

== Geography ==
The community is surrounded by Fallowfield to the south, Moss Side to the west, Victoria Park to the east and Chorlton-on-Medlock to the north.

=== Platt Fields Park ===
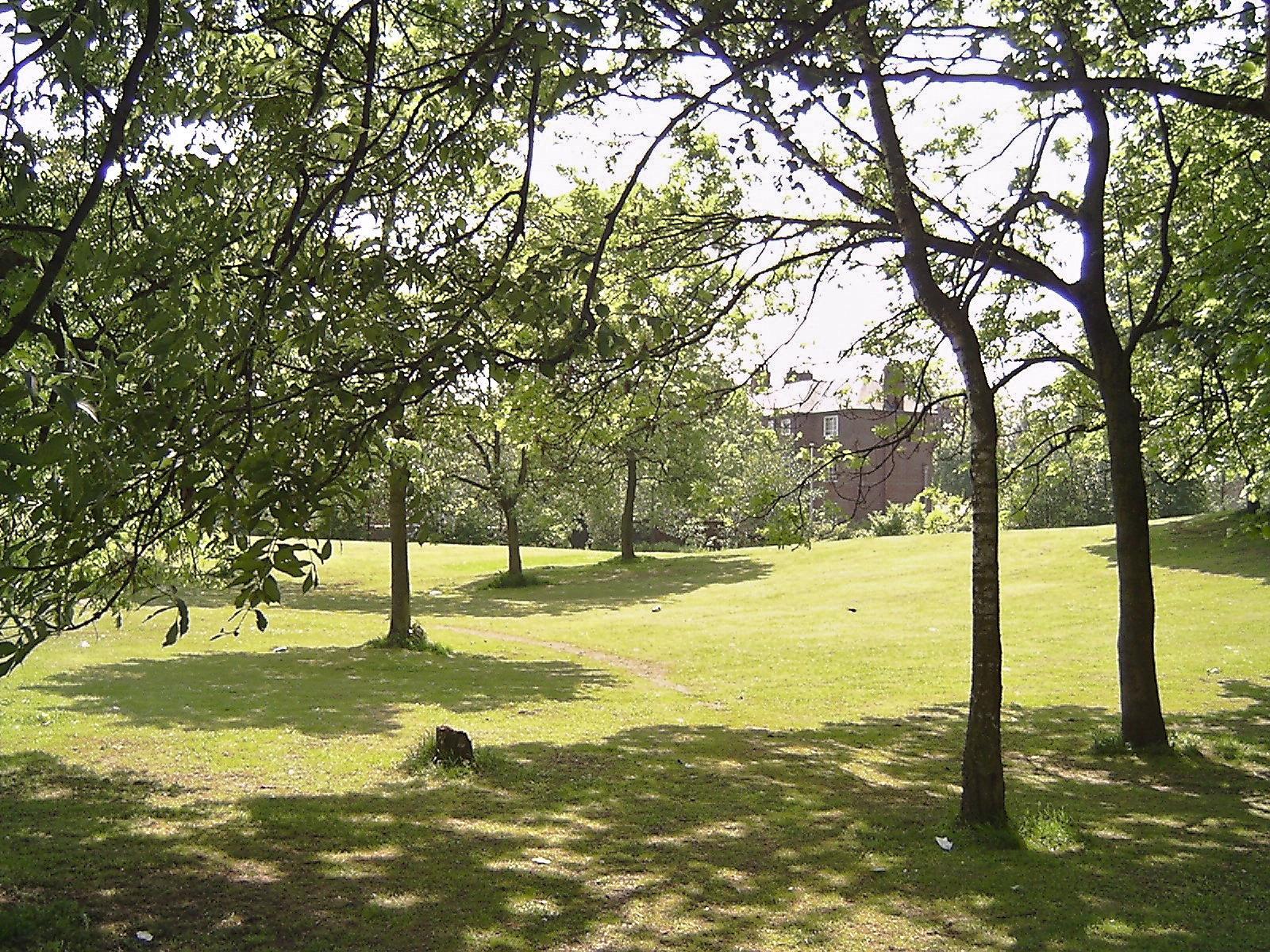
A view of Platt Fields Park

A large public park in the south-west, it opened in 1910 and proved popular; it was maintained by a team of up to 50 gardeners until the second half of the 20th century. The centrepiece is a large pleasure lake used for boating and fishing. The grounds contain Platt Hall, several formal gardens, and three dedicated show fields for outdoor events. In 2010, Platt Fields Park received a Green Flag Award for achieving the national standard for parks and green spaces.

== Churches ==
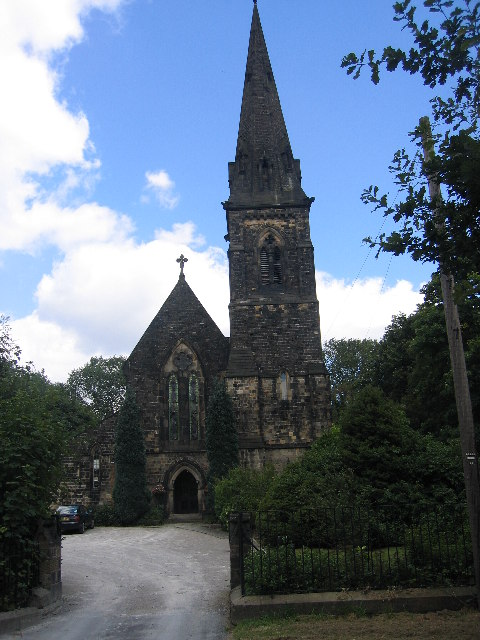
St James House (the former chapel of St James)

The Anglican Church of the Holy Trinity is in Platt Lane. At Birch in Rusholme is the now disused, much older chapel of ease of St James (formerly known as Birch Chapel). The present building was built in 1845–1846 to replace an earlier chapel of 1595. The architect was J. M. Derick and it is in Gothic Revival style. The south-west tower is topped by a broach spire; the aisle arcades have five bays. Since its conversion into a nursing home it has been known as St James House. The Housing Group of the St James', Birch, Fellowship investigated housing conditions in Chorlton-on-Medlock in 1931.

In Thurloe Street is the Roman Catholic Church of St Edward. The architect was E. W. Pugin and the church was built in 1861–1862. It is small and the exterior sober; the planned south-west tower was never built and there is an apse at the east end. The arcades have short polished granite columns.

A Wesleyan Church once stood on Dickenson Road near the junction with Wilmslow Road. It was designed in the Gothic Revival style by the architects William Hayley & Son, and opened in 1862. The chapel closed to worship in 1937 and after some years in use as a film and television studio, it was demolished in 1975.

== Culture and cultural references ==
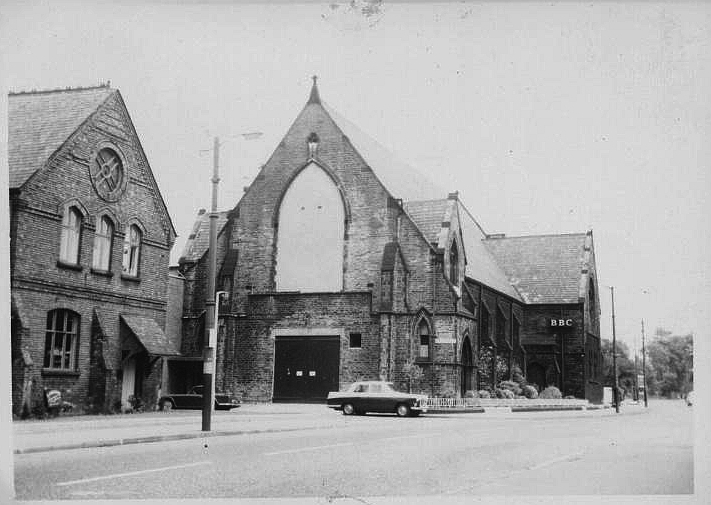
Dickenson Road Studios, the former Wesleyan chapel and film studio on Dickenson Road

John Ruskin gave the lectures later published as Sesame and Lilies in 1865 at Rusholme Town Hall.

In 1947 the disused Wesleyan church on Dickenson Road was converted into a film studios by Mancunian Films. Between 1947 and 1954 the company produced many feature films at Dickenson Road Studios, including the first Manchester-made feature film, Cup-Tie Honeymoon starring Sandy Powell and Pat Phoenix. Many Mancunian productions were filmed in local streets. In 1963 the BBC bought the studios as its northern base and on New Year's Day 1964 the first edition of Top of the Pops was broadcast from the Rusholme premises, presented by Jimmy Savile and opening with the Rolling Stones performing "I Wanna Be Your Man". Top of the Pops was broadcast from Rusholme until 1967, when the show moved to a larger facility at Lime Grove Studios in London. In 1975 the BBC transferred its operations to the New Broadcasting House in Oxford Road and the Dickenson Road chapel building was demolished. Today, a commemorative plaque affixed to a house marks the site of it.

Rusholme was mentioned in the song "Rusholme Ruffians" by the Smiths on their 1985 album Meat Is Murder. According to the Smiths' singer, Morrissey: "[The song] is about going to a fair and being stabbed."

Mint Royale's 1999 album On the Ropes contained a track titled "From Rusholme with Love".

Rusholme was the home of the second indoor ice-skating rink in England, after the London Glaciarium, although this has since been replaced by a grocery store, having spent many years as a cabaret venue (Oceans 11).

== Social and economic conditions ==
=== Social conditions ===
Rusholme is one of the south Manchester areas, along with Moss Side, Longsight, Hulme and Old Trafford, to have suffered from gang-related gun crime and gang activity. However, shooting incidents had declined by the 2000s.

=== Wilmslow Road ===
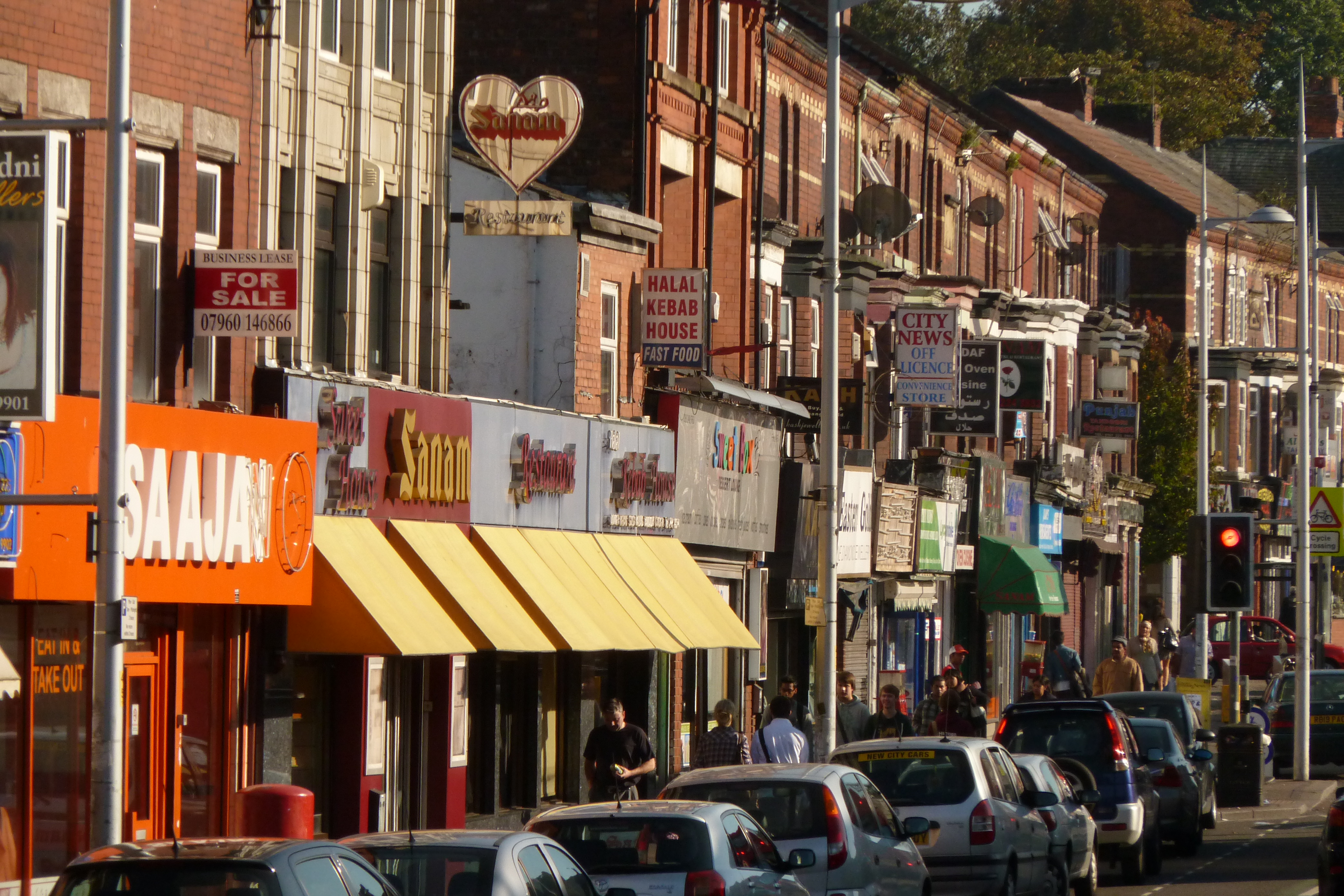
Wilmslow Road (B5117), Rusholme

Wilmslow Road is part of the B5117, a thoroughfare running from Parrs Wood north into the city centre, traversing the campuses of the University of Manchester and Manchester Metropolitan University. It forms part of what is the busiest bus route in Europe, with many stops being serviced by a bus ran by the Bee Network every 60 to 90 seconds during peak times. A section of this road known locally as the Curry Mile contains at least 70 restaurants, takeaways and kebab houses specialising in the cuisines of South Asia and the Middle East. Appleby Lodge is a 1930s block of flats opposite Platt Fields Park.

== Notable people ==
The cricket writer and music critic Neville Cardus (1888–1975) was born in Rusholme, as were musicians Roy Harper (born 1941) and Marc Riley (born 1961), actors Alan Badel (1923–1982) and Tina O'Brien (born 1983), and the novelist and dramatist Ian Hay: John Hay Beith (1876–1952). Others include Marguerite Addy, a Spanish Civil War nurse and Second World War spy. The Irish singer-sonwriter Christy Moore lived here in the 60s.

== See also ==
- Listed buildings in Manchester-M14
- "Rusholme Ruffians", a song from the 1985 studio album Meat Is Murder by English rock band the Smiths
