= Mancunian Films =

British film production company

Coordinates: 53.452398°N 2.220274°W

- Mancunian Films production logo

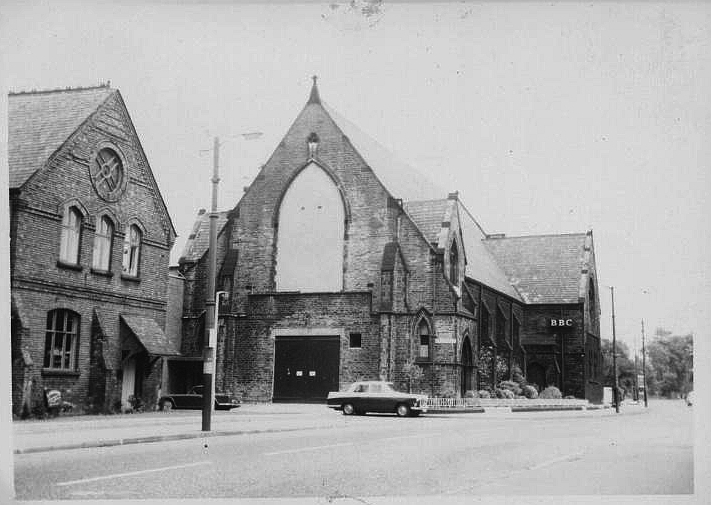
- Dickenson Road Studios, Manchester (pictured c. 1965 after sale to the BBC)
- Formerly: Blakeley's Productions, Ltd
- Traded as: The Mancunian Film Distributors, Ltd
- Industry: Film production company
- Genre: Comedy films, light entertainment
- Founded: 1934
- Founder: John E. Blakeley
- Defunct: 1954
- Fate: (Studio sold to the BBC)
- Headquarters: London and Manchester, United Kingdom
- Number of locations: 2

Mancunian Films was a British film production company first organised in 1933. From 1947 it was based in Rusholme, a suburb of Manchester, and produced a number of comedy films, mostly aimed at audiences in the North of England.

== History ==
Founded by John E. Blakeley, the company produced films in London on extremely low-budgets. From property records at HM Land Registry, on 17 June 1933 Blakeley's Productions Limited, 148 Slade Lane, Levenshulme in Manchester bought Hulme Hippodrome for £17,900, selling it on 23 December 1935. Blakeley's first studio consisted of a single soundstage in a loft space in London above a taxi garage. Whenever the filmmakers wanted to shoot a scene, they would first have to signal the mechanics below to stop working, so the noise from below wouldn't register on the soundtracks. Blakeley's first production was Boots! Boots! (1934), starring the variety entertainer George Formby in his first released film. Production values were so low that some scenes were filmed in semi-darkness, to hide the lack of set decorations. Despite the limitations, the debut film was a huge success in the regions, recouping Blakeley's investment several times over and launching George Formby as Britain's leading screen comedian. Within the year "Blakeley's Productions, Ltd." had become "The Mancunian Film Distributors, Ltd". Blakeley initially used facilities like Riverside Studios; the films were released via Butcher's Films.

=== Dickenson Road Studios ===
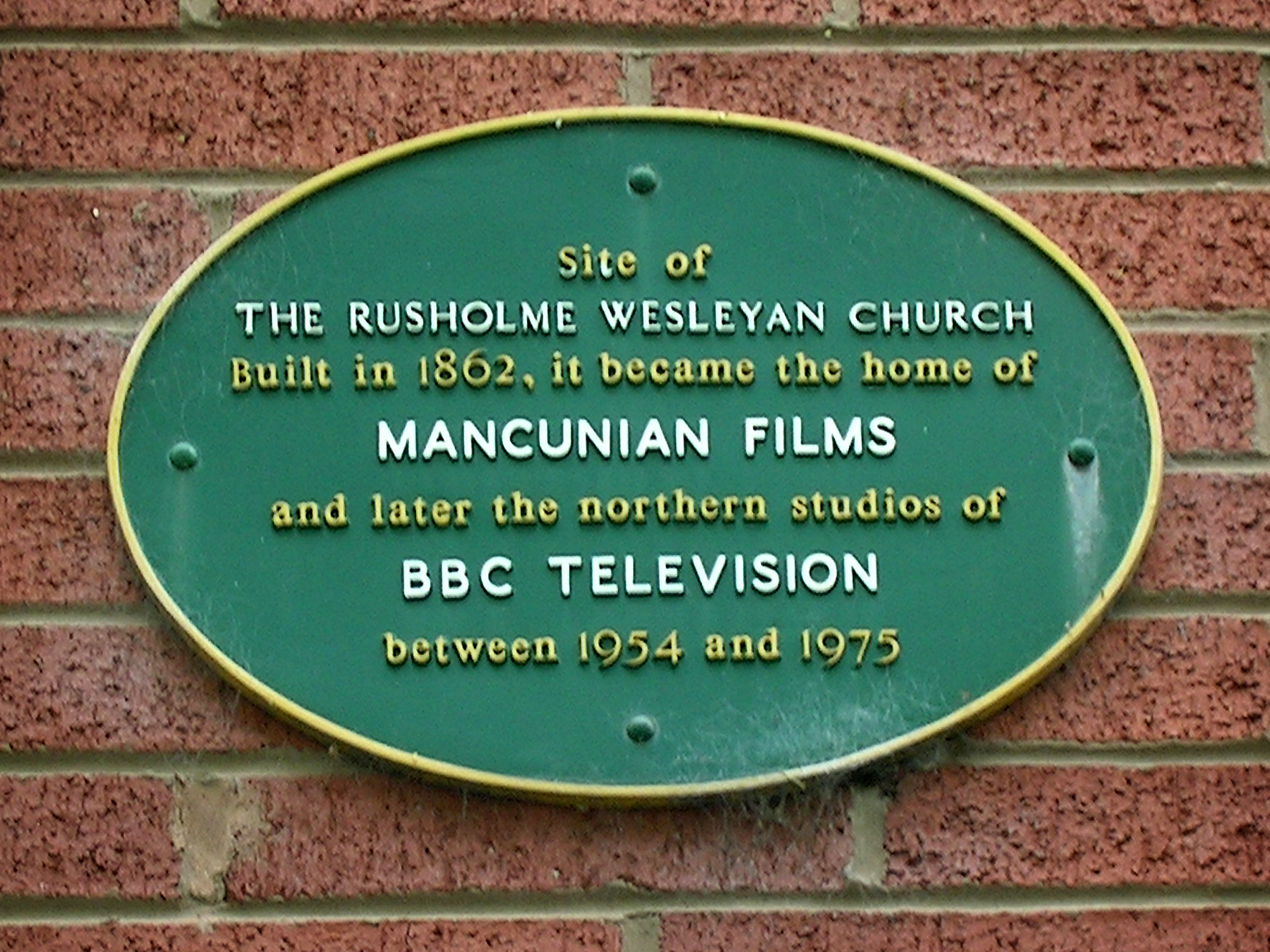
A plaque on a house wall marks the former site of Dickenson Road Studios

Escalating costs and a desire to cater for the robust tastes of northern industrial audiences led to the establishment of the two-stage facility at Dickenson Road Studios, a former Methodist Chapel on Dickenson Road in Rusholme, the only film studio outside the South East. The buildings were converted at a cost of £70,000 in 1947, with funding from the National Film Finance Corporation (NFFC), which provided grants to support independent British studios.

Beginning with Cup-tie Honeymoon (1948) starring Sandy Powell, over the next six years the films went on to feature northern favourites Frank Randle, Josef Locke, Diana Dors, and Jimmy Clitheroe. The Mancunian Films production operation earned the nickname "the Hollywood of the North", or alternatively "Jollywood", on account of its output of comedy films. Critics of Mancunian's productions dubbed the studio the "Corn Exchange", a humorous reference to the Corn Exchange in Manchester ("corn" being a slang term for unoriginal, poor-quality humour).

The studio, often working on shoestring budgets, was profitable. The cinematographic expertise developed in Manchester formed the foundations of Granada Television.

In 1950, the NFFC demanded that Blakeley repay its £50,000 loan. The NFFC chairman, Lord Reith, expressed dissatisfaction with the quality of Mancunian's comedy productions; of Over the Garden Wall (1950), Reith said it was not "of as high a quality as the Corporation would have wished". This created a funding crisis for the studio, but Blakeley managed to raise the necessary monies from profits on his movies and by hiring out the facilities at Dickenson Road to other production companies such as Hammer Horror for filming B-movies. After overcoming these difficulties, Blakely decided to retire when he reached 65, and handed control of Mancunian Films to his son Tom Blakely.

In the 1950s, the growing reach television and the decline of cinema's audience size, led to many film studios being converted to for television broadcasts. In London, the BBC acquired Lime Grove Studios from Gainsborough Pictures in 1949, and Ealing Studios in 1955. Dickenson Road Studios was bought from Mancunian by the BBC in 1954, and it became the first regional BBC Television studio outside London. Programmes made by the BBC at the studios included series starring comedian Harry Worth and variety programmes. The first episode of the pop music television show Top of the Pops was broadcast from Dickenson Road Studio on 1 January 1964, presented by Jimmy Savile and opening with The Rolling Stones performing "I Wanna Be Your Man". The studios remained the home of Top of the Pops until 1967, when the show moved to the larger facility at Lime Grove. The Dickenson Road building was demolished in 1975 after operations were transferred to the BBC's new building at New Broadcasting House on Oxford Road.

=== Mancunian Films Library ===
Mancunian Films Library, in storage at Kay Laboratories, was lost in a fire in 1980. Mike Blakeley, cameraman and grandson of John E. Blakeley, was reported to be attempting to find and restore all of Blakeley's films in 2003. Working with CP Lee of the University of Salford in promoting the detailed history of the Mancunian Film Studio via film screenings and facts about Mancunian Films and its actors.

== Selected filmography ==
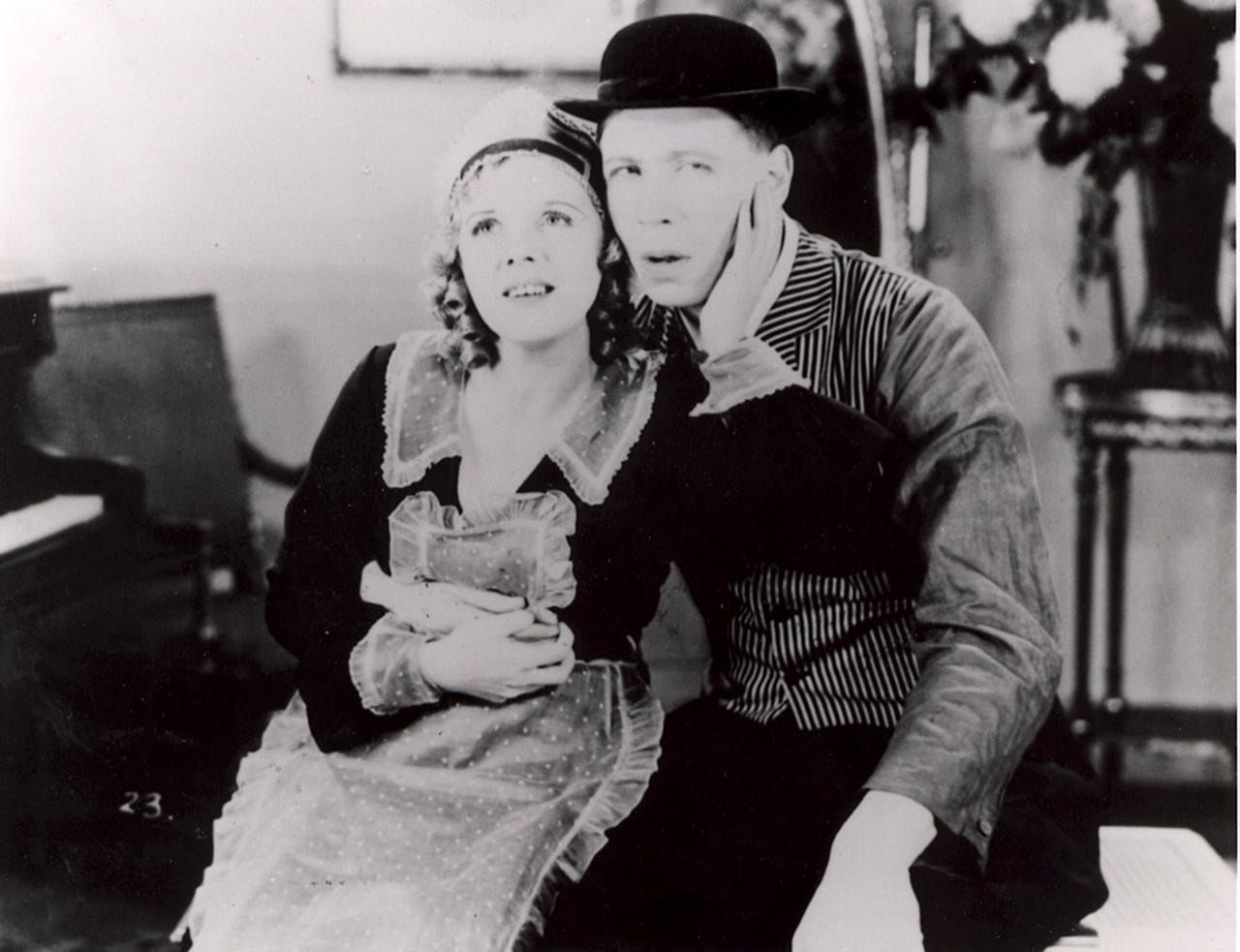
George Formby and his wife Beryl Formby in Mancunian's 1934 production Boots! Boots!

- Boots! Boots! (1934)
- Off the Dole (1935)
- Cup-tie Honeymoon (1948)
- International Circus Review (1948)
- Holidays with Pay (1948)
- Showground of the North (1948)
- Somewhere in Politics (1948)
- What a Carry On (1949)
- School for Randle (1949)
- Over the Garden Wall (1950)
- Let's Have a Murder (1950)
- Love's a Luxury (1952)
- Those People Next Door (1952)
- It's a Grand Life (1953)

== Bibliography ==
- Williams, Philip Martin & David L. (2001) New Edition(2006) Hooray for Jollywood - The Life of John E. Blakeley & The Mancunian Film Corporation ISBN 978-0-9518012-9-1
- Montgomery, J. (1969) Comedy Films, 1894-1954 ISBN 0-04-791018-6

== See also ==
- Media in Manchester
