= It's a Grand Life =

1953 British film by John E. Blakeley

- British theatrical poster
- Directed by: John E. Blakeley
- Written by: H. F. Maltby; Frank Randle
- Produced by: John E. Blakeley
- Starring: Frank Randle; Diana Dors
- Cinematography: Ernest Palmer
- Edited by: Dorothy Stimson
- Distributed by: Mancunian Films
- Release date: November 1953
- Running time: 102 minutes
- Country: United Kingdom
- Language: English

It's a Grand Life, also known as As You Were, is a 1953 British film described in its opening titles as a comedy burlesque. It was directed by John E. Blakeley and stars Frank Randle and Diana Dors.

Randle, who made his final film appearance in It's a Grand Life, had previously starred in a series of World War II army comedies: Somewhere in England (1940), Somewhere in Camp (1942), Somewhere on Leave (1942), Somewhere in Civvies (1943) and Somewhere in Politics (1948).

== Scenario ==
The film contains a series of sketches set in army life in the Essex Regiment in the post-World War II era, mostly involving Randle as an accident-prone private.

One of the subplots involves a glamorous Women's Royal Army Corps corporal who is pursued by her company sergeant major. Other set pieces include a wrestling match with Jack Pye and a drill sequence.

== Cast ==
- Frank Randle as Private Randle
- Diana Dors as Corporal Paula Clements
- Dan Young as Private Young
- Michael Brennan as Sergeant Major O'Reilly
- Jennifer Jayne as Private Desmond
- John Blythe as Private Philip Green
- Anthony Hulme as Captain Saunders
- Charles Peters as Private Rubenstein
- Arthur White as Private Prendergast
- Leslie Gould
- Kevin Peters
- Ian Fleming as Mr. Clements
- Ruth Taylor as Mrs. Clements
- Jack Pye as himself, wrestler
- Bill Gernon as himself, wrestler
- Cab Cashford as himself, wrestler
- Carl Van Wurden as himself, wrestler
- Winifred Atwell as herself, guest artiste
- Peter Mullings as dance hall manager (uncredited)
- George Jackson as jeep driver (uncredited)

== Production ==
It's a Grand Life was one of several low-budget comedies featuring Dors in the era. She was paid £1,000 for five weeks' work. Dors later said that she "loathed the script and everything about it" but that her manager and husband Dennis Hamilton insisted that she take the role. Dors also claimed that Randle's drinking and temperament had delayed production.

The film was shot in Manchester.

== Reception ==
The Monthly Film Bulletin wrote: "The slight story is no more than a peg on which to hang a series of music-hall sketches, which will be recognised by those who are familiar with Randle's stage work. They have a certain rustic humour, but most of the gags and business have worn rather thin with the years, though they may still be appreciated by less sophisticated audiences. Winifred Attwell makes a guest appearance."

In the Radio Times, Tony Sloman called the film a "quaint and cheap army caper," and wrote of Randle, "If you've never seen him, give this a chance you might find he'll tickle your fancy. But if you have an aversion to music-hall stars on celluloid, give up, for Randle has neither the wit of George Formby nor the warmth of Gracie Fields, and by the time this movie was made he was looking tired and rather grubby."
