= Jimmy Clitheroe =

Comic entertainer (1921–1973)

- Jimmy Clitheroe
- Born: James Robinson Clitheroe; 24 December 1921; Clitheroe, Lancashire, England
- Died: 6 June 1973 (aged 51); Blackpool, Lancashire, England
- Resting place: Carleton Crematorium and Cemetery, Blackpool, Lancashire, England
- Occupations: Comedian, actor, musician
- Height: 4 ft 2 in (1.27 m)

James Robinson Clitheroe (24 December 1921 – 6 June 1973) was an English comic entertainer. He is best remembered for his long-running BBC Radio programme, The Clitheroe Kid (1956–1972).

== Early years ==
Jimmy Clitheroe was born on Christmas Eve 1921 in Clitheroe, Lancashire, England, to weavers Emma Pye and James Robert Clitheroe, who had married in 1918. His place of birth was his maternal grandparents' home at 58 Wilkin Street (now called Highfield Road). His childhood was spent in the mill village of Blacko, near Nelson, where he lived at 14 Spout Houses, a row of terraced houses below Blacko Tower. He attended the Council School until the age of 12 and transferred to Barrowford Board School for his final two years, in an era when education was compulsory only up to the age of 14.

An only child, he was named after his mother's younger brother, James Robinson Pye. Born in Clitheroe in 1894, Pye was killed in action in the First World War.

According to newspapers in 1938, Clitheroe was 3 feet 6.5 inches (1.08 m) tall at the age of 16. Although his father was over 6 feet (1.8 m) tall, Jimmy never grew any taller than 4 feet 2 inches (1.27 m) – about the average height for an eight- or nine-year-old boy. His small size was thought to be caused by his thyroid gland being damaged at birth during a forceps delivery. According to author Robert Ross, however, Jimmy's short stature was due to a rare genetic disorder, and until later life he could easily pass for an 11-year-old, which was the character he played on stage, in his early films, and on radio and television.

== Career ==
Unable to work in the weaving sheds with his parents, being too short to reach the looms, Clitheroe worked for a time in a bakery in Nelson. He also toured the variety theatres in Yorkshire and Lancashire from 1937 as a boy accordionist, as well as playing the xylophone and saxophone. He later bought a caravan to use when touring the various towns in which he was appearing at the theatre. He made his pantomime debut in 1938, alongside the bumptious "Two Ton" Tessie O'Shea. In pantomime he was usually cast as Buttons, Tom Thumb, or Wishee Washee. He moved into films from 1940 (thanks to a chance meeting with "top of the bill" stars Arthur Lucan and Kitty McShane) and radio from 1954 (initially on the BBC's regional Home Service North, and subsequently on the nationwide BBC Light Programme), then television from 1963 (with ITV, produced by ABC Television in their Manchester studios).

During the 1940s, Clitheroe appeared in pantomime and summer season dates, and in films, with stars of the day including Arthur Lucan (as Old Mother Riley), George Formby, Vera Lynn, and Frank Randle. In 1959, he was invited to take part in the Royal Command variety show, in the presence of the Queen Mother.

His long-running radio programme on the BBC, The Clitheroe Kid, was broadcast from 1956 until August 1972. His catchphrase was "Don't some mothers 'ave 'em!" Two versions of the radio series were produced for television on the ITV network: That's My Boy! (which ran for seven episodes in 1963), followed by Just Jimmy (which ran for five years, between 1964 and 1968). His mother in Just Jimmy was played by Mollie Sugden, who had worked with Clitheroe in his stage shows.

Clitheroe owned a bookmaker's shop on Springfield Road, Blackpool, and the Fernhill Hotel at Preesall. He appeared on the Blackpool stage from 1936 until 1971. The Clitheroe Kid was cancelled by the BBC in August 1972 after a 16-year run.

== Personal life ==
From 1960 onwards, Clitheroe lived in a bungalow at 118 Bispham Road in Blackpool with his mother, to whom he was devoted. His father had died on 9 January 1951, from complications arising from injuries sustained in the First World War. Jimmy was godfather to co-star Diana Day's daughter. She named her son James after him. Clitheroe never married.

For many years he drove a Mercedes car that had been specially adapted to allow his feet to reach the pedals. Appearing to be an underage driver, he could seldom complete a journey without attracting the attention of the police.

== Illness and death ==
On 30 March 1973, while touring with a variety show, Clitheroe collapsed in his hotel room in Plymouth and spent four days in hospital. On 6 June 1973, the day of his mother's funeral, he took an accidental overdose of sleeping pills combined with seven brandies. He was found unconscious in bed by relatives and died later that day in hospital in Blackpool. His mother had died five days earlier, aged 84. His funeral was held on 11 June 1973 at Carleton Crematorium, attended by over 300 people. For many years he was commemorated there by a plaque attached to memorial tree Number 3.

== Filmography ==
- Old Mother Riley in Society (1940) with Lucan and McShane – as Boots
- Much Too Shy (1942) with George Formby – as Jimmy
- Rhythm Serenade (1943) with Dame Vera Lynn – as Joey
- Somewhere in Politics (1948) with Frank Randle – as Sonny
- School for Randle (1949) with Frank Randle – as Jimmy
- Stars in Your Eyes (1956) with Nat Jackley – as Joey
- Jules Verne's Rocket to the Moon (1967) with Burl Ives – as General Tom Thumb
