= Happidrome =

Happidrome may refer to:

- The Happidrome (radio), a BBC radio comedy series starring Harry Korris
- Happidrome (film), a 1943 film adaptation of the radio series
- "Happidrome", a nickname for the Reporting Room, the RAF ground-controlled interception radar control room of World War 2
