= Jack Pye =

British professional wrestler (1903–1985)

Jack Pye, also known as Dirty Jack Pye, Filthy Jack Pye and The Doncaster Panther, (July 9, 1903 – December 8, 1985) was an English professional wrestler and actor from Doncaster, England. He was born John Pye on 9 July 1903 in Hindley near Wigan.

== Family ==
John Pye is a descendant of the powerful Pye Family. John married his wife Lillian Wright and they had 2 sons,

- Dominic, was killed in a shotgun accident in February 1979 while shooting on his land in Mains Lane, Singleton near Blackpool.
- Jackey, died at the age of 12 in an accidental drowning.

He also had an illegitimate son with Edith Tomlinson

- John Paul b. 1966, in Blackpool, who now lives in Thailand working as a civil engineer. John Paul has two daughters, Emma Praew Tomlinson (born 4 June 1999) and Jenny Ploy Tomlinson (born 16 July 2001). .

== Death ==
John Pye was the eldest of 11 children, and he died in Blackpool Victoria hospital on 8 December 1985. His youngest sibling, Ellen (Nellie) died in 2006 in Bishop Auckland.

== Bronze Bust ==
A bronze bust of Jack Pye which used to have a prominent place in the Castle Casino in Blackpool, is currently on display at Blackpool's Stanley Park Sports Centre. The bronze bust was donated to the Blackpool County Council due to its striking resemblance to Jack, which caused considerable discomfort to his surviving family.

== Wrestling career ==
In 1933, Pye came close to beating Atholl Oakeley for the British Heavyweight Championship. Other members of the Pye family who became wrestlers include brothers Harry Pye (who became a middle weight boxer), Tommy Pye (who became the light-heavy-weight wrestling champion of Great Britain), and Frank "Bully Pye" (the lightweight champion of Great Britain). Jack Pye's son, Dominic Pye was another family member to take up wrestling. Dominic had a tag partner called Casey Pye whose real name was Harry Bennett. They both appeared in the 1967 film 'Cuckoo Patrol' starring Freddie and the Dreamers. Dominic Pye went on to train several professional wrestlers, such as "Mad" Jock Cameron, who became well known on the British circuit in the 1960s. Jack Pye was presented with a Gold Jaeger-LeCoultre wrist watch as a retirement present in January 1964, the watch was presented by the Blackpool Tower Company Limited and Bill Best.

== Film career ==
Pye also appeared in several films:

- Wives Never Know 1936. Starring: Charlie Ruggles and Mary Boland
- Leave It to Me (1937). Starring: Sandy Powell.
- It's a Grand Life in 1953 (as a wrestler). Starring: Frank Randle and Diana Dors
