= Harry Korris =

British comedian and actor (1891–1971)

- Korris in Happidrome (1943)
- Born: Henry Lowe Corris; 8 October 1891; Onchan, Isle of Man
- Died: 3 June 1971 (aged 79); Blackpool, Lancashire, England
- Occupation(s): Comedian, actor
- Years active: c.1910–1950

Harry Korris (born Henry Lowe Corris; 8 October 1891 – 3 June 1971) was a Manx-British comedian and actor. He was a star of the hit BBC radio show Happidrome, and of the 1943 film version. He also appeared in several Frank Randle films.

== Biography ==
He was born in Onchan on the Isle of Man. In his teens he worked as a legal clerk in Douglas, while also taking part in amateur theatrical productions. In 1911, he became manager of an amusement resort in Ramsey, and became known as "The Manx Harry Lauder". During the winter seasons, he performed in theatres in Yorkshire, and started to develop his stage character of a typical north of England comic. After marrying in 1913, he moved to England and was increasingly recognised as "a versatile comedian in revue, pantomime and on the stage".

He regularly returned to the Isle of Man while maintaining a successful career in Britain. By 1926, he was being described as "built more for comfort than speed", a reference to his girth. In the 1930s, he performed regularly in Blackpool, where he settled and was known as "the Falstaff of the South Pier". From 1931, he occasionally broadcast on BBC radio, becoming a nationally known figure, and featured in three Frank Randle films. In 1941, he became the star of the popular BBC radio comedy Happidrome, playing the part of Mr Lovejoy, a harassed variety show performer and theatre manager. The programme regularly featured guests such as Sandy Powell, Charles Penrose, Jack Warner, Beryl Reid, and Vic Oliver, and was one of the most popular to be broadcast during the Second World War. During this period, he also travelled with ENSA to entertain troops in Burma and elsewhere.

He continued to perform after the end of the war, before retiring in 1950. He continued to live in Blackpool, raised money for charities, and made occasional guest appearances on television. He died in Blackpool in 1971, aged 79.

== Filmography ==
- Somewhere in England (1940)
- Somewhere in Camp (1942)
- Somewhere on Leave (1943)
- Happidrome (1943)

== Bibliography ==
- Richards, Jeffrey. Films and British National Identity: from Dickens to Dad's Army. Manchester University Press, 1997.
