= Carleton Crematorium and Cemetery =

Cemetery in Lancashire, England

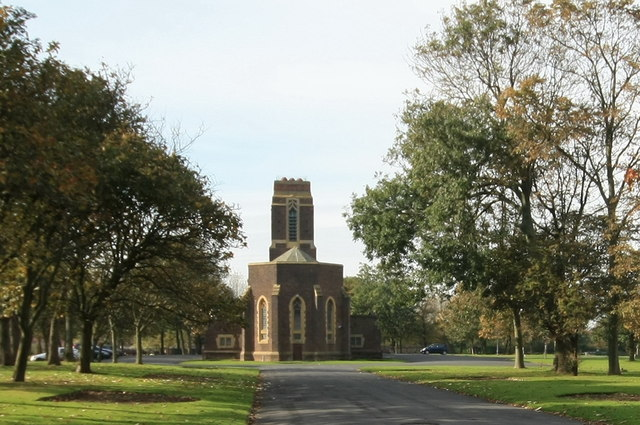
- Interactive map of Carleton Crematorium and Cemetery

Details
- Established: 18 July 1935
- Location: Carleton, Lancashire
- Country: England
- Coordinates: 53.8462°N 3.0211°W
- Type: Public
- Owned by: Blackpool Council
- Website: Official website
- Find a Grave: Carleton Crematorium and Cemetery

Carleton Crematorium, together with the adjacent necropolis, Carleton Cemetery, is a graveyard located within the Greenlands ward of Blackpool, with its main entrance on Stocks Road in Carleton, Lancashire, England. It was opened on 18 July 1935.

The building was created by Blackpool Borough architect J. C. Robinson, who based his design on his own interpretation of the Mausoleum of Mausolus. At the north door is a chapel containing Books of Remembrance, which note the names of all those cremated or interred there.

The site is located partly in Blackpool and partly in Carleton; the crematorium comes under the jurisdiction of Blackpool Council.

== Notable cremations and interments ==
A number of notable people have been buried or cremated at the site. These include:

=== Carleton Cemetery ===
- Norman Evans, variety and radio artiste
- Frank Randle, comedian
- Arthur Worsley, ventriloquist

There are 88 Commonwealth service personnel of the Second World War buried at the cemetery.

=== Carleton Crematorium ===
- Lennie Bennett, comedian and game show host.
- Charlie Cairoli, clown, impressionist and musician
- Violet Carson, actress
- Jimmy Clitheroe, comedian
- John Comer, actor
- Reginald Dixon, organist
- Ian Stuart Donaldson, white power singer, songwriter and guitarist.
- Roy Gratrix, professional footballer
- Hugh Kelly, professional football player and manager
- Tony Melody, television actor
- Stan Mortensen, professional footballer
- Bernie Nolan, singer, actress, TV personality.
- Beatrix Potter, author and illustrator, botanist, and conservationist, best known for her children's books

The Commonwealth War Graves Commission has erected a white stone memorial near the crematorium listing 54 Commonwealth service personnel cremated here during the Second World War.

== Gallery ==
Jimmy Clitheroe's memorial tree

Norman Evans' grave

Frank Randle's grave
