= Majestic Halt =

Railway station in Isle of Man, UK

Majestic Mooaralagh
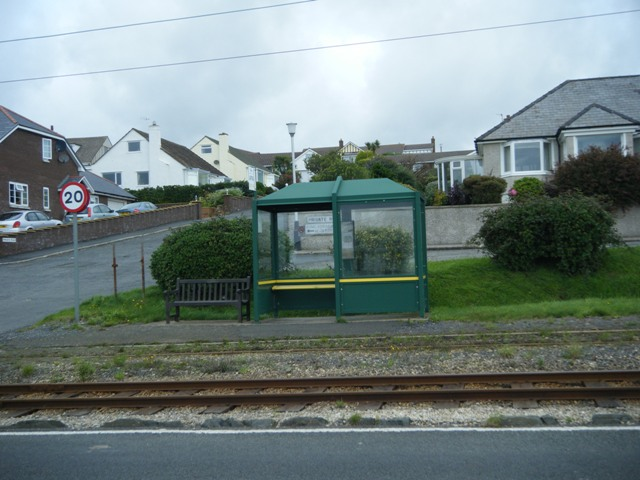

General information
- Location: Onchan, Isle Of Man
- Coordinates: 54.17103°N 4.44223°W
- Pole No.: 050-051
- System: Manx Electric Railway
- Owner: Isle Of Man Railways
- Platforms: Ground Level Only
- Tracks: Two Running Lines

Construction
- Structure type: Small Shelter
- Parking: Roadside

History
- Opened: 1893
- Former names: Manx Electric Railway Co.
Location

Majestic Halt (Manx: Stadd Mooaralagh) is a request stop on the Manx Electric Railway on the Isle of Man and is the third stopping place on the line.

== Origins ==
The halt gains its name from the large Baillie Scott-designed hotel which was once located across the road from the tramlines. When the railway was first installed, the road which runs alongside was laid as well, but there was very little motor transport and the tram service provided the most popular link to this, one of the island's premier hotels.

== Status ==
The tram station was only ever denoted by a "Request Stop" board and no passenger facilities were provided until 1999 when, in line with management policy to provide passenger waiting facilities wherever possible, a modern shelter was erected, in conjunction with the bus services. Prior to this a simple park bench had sufficed as accommodation for over a century. Despite the closure, demolition and redevelopment of the nearby hotel, the station has remained open, albeit not appearing officially on timetables and literature.

== Hotel ==
Commercial Postcard

The imposing Majestic Hotel that occupied the land now taken by exclusive apartments, was for many years a popular destination for tourists, being open to non-residents and boasting among other facilities, an outdoor swimming pool. Having declined in the 1980s it latterly served as an auction house prior to lying empty for some time before being razed to the ground to make way for the development that remains today.

Preceding station	Manx Electric Railway	Following station
Café Royale towards Derby Castle	Douglas–Ramsey	Braeside towards Ramsey Station

== Also ==
- Manx Electric Railway Stations
- Onchan

== Sources ==
- Manx Electric Railway Stopping Places (2002) Manx Electric Railway Society
- Island Images: Manx Electric Railway Pages (2003) Jon Wornham
- Official Tourist Department Page (2009) Isle Of Man Heritage Railways
