= Braeside Halt =

Train station in the Isle of Man

Braeside Braeside
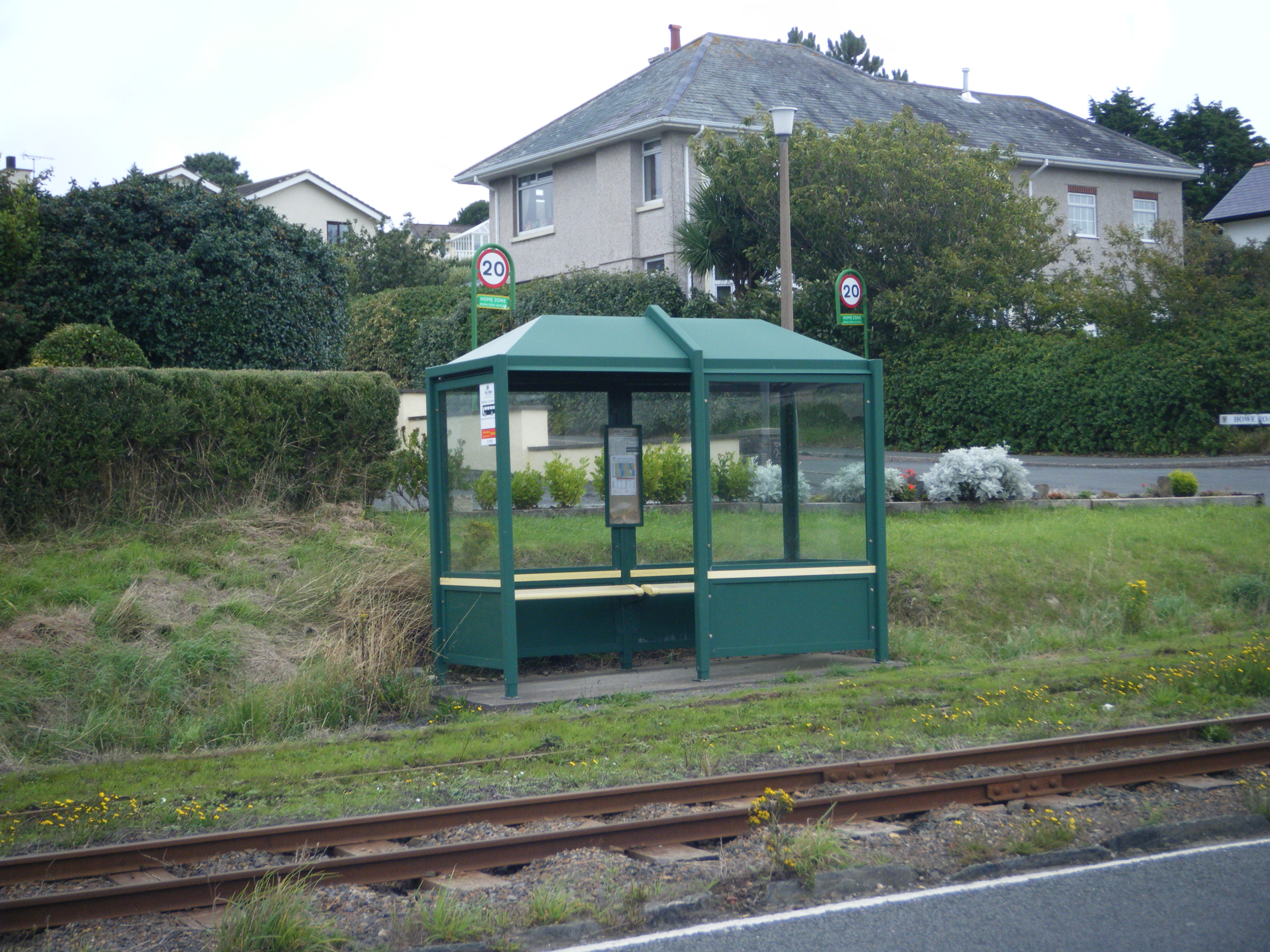

General information
- Location: Onchan, Isle of Man
- Coordinates: 54.17029°N 4.43729°W
- Pole No.: 057-058
- System: Manx Electric Railway
- Owner: Isle of Man Railways
- Platforms: Ground Level
- Tracks: Two Running Lines

Construction
- Structure type: Bus Shelter
- Parking: None

History
- Opened: 1893
- Former names: Manx Electric Railway Co.
Location

Braeside Halt (Manx: Stadd Braeside) is a stopping place on the Manx Electric Railway on the Isle of Man and is located on the first section of the inter-urban line a short distance from its southernmost terminus.

== Origins ==
This halt can be located a short distance from the previous halt, being a simple wayside halt there are no facilities for waiting passengers, the only evidence of such a halt existing being the "Request Stop" signage, latterly replaced by modern bus stop signage during management policy changes that took effect during 1999 at which point a modern bus-type shelter was also erected on the site. The tram stop sign is located not affixed to the shelter but atop a nearby traction pole.

== Route ==
Preceding station	Manx Electric Railway	Following station
Majestic towards Derby Castle	Douglas–Ramsey	Far End towards Ramsey Station

== See also ==
- Manx Electric Railway Stations
- Onchan

== Sources ==
- Manx Electric Railway Stopping Places (2002) Manx Electric Railway Society
- Island Images: Manx Electric Railway Pages (2003) Jon Wornham
- Official Tourist Department Page (2009) Isle of Man Heritage Railways
