= Something Always Happens =

Something Always Happens may refer to:

- Something Always Happens (1934 film), a British romantic comedy film
- Something Always Happens (1928 film), an American silent horror film
