= That's My Boy (1963 TV series) =

1963 British TV series

- Genre: Sitcom
- Written by: Bob Block
- Starring: Jimmy Clitheroe; Deryck Guyler
- Country of origin: United Kingdom
- Original language: English
- No. of series: 1
- No. of episodes: 7

Production
- Running time: 30 minutes
- Production company: ABC Television

Original release
- Network: ABC Television
- Release: 10 November – 22 December 1963

That's My Boy is a British television series which was broadcast in 1963. Produced by ABC Weekend TV, it was broadcast only in the Midlands and Northern England. A half-hour sitcom, the series starred Jimmy Clitheroe. The series survives intact, and the complete series was issued on DVD by Network on 19 May 2014.
