= Nancy O'Neil =

British actress (1907–1995)

- Picturegoer postcard
- Born: 25 August 1907; Sydney; Australia
- Died: 5 March 1995 (aged 87); London; United Kingdom
- Other name: Nancy Smith
- Education: RADA
- Occupations: Film actress Stage actress
- Years active: 1934–1962 (film)
- Spouse(s): Dermot Trench (m.1938–1984; his death)
- Children: 2

Nancy O'Neil (born Nancy Muriel Smith; 25 August 1907 – 5 March 1995) was an Australian-born British actress.

== Partial filmography ==
Year	Title	Role	Notes
1934	Jack Ahoy	Patricia Fraser	
1934	The Secret of the Loch	Angela Heggie	
1934	Sometimes Good	Millie Tarrant	
1934	Something Always Happens	Cynthia Hatch	
1934	Crazy People	Nanda Macdonald	
1935	Brewster's Millions	Cynthia	
1935	Hello, Sweetheart	Helen Taylor	
1935	Butter and Egg Man		
1936	Twelve Good Men	Ann	
1936	The Brown Wallet	Eleanor	
1936	Educated Evans	Mary	
1936	Head Office	Margaret	
1937	Fifty-Shilling Boxer	Moira Regan	
1937	The Angelus	June Rowland	
1937	There Was a Young Man	Barbara Blake	
1937	East of Ludgate Hill		
1938	Darts Are Trumps	Mary Drake	
1940	Garrison Follies	Sally Richards	
1943	Somewhere in Civvies	Mary Randle	
1943	Headline	Molly Dean	
1949	Once a Jolly Swagman	2nd Secretary	Uncredited
1953	The Titfield Thunderbolt	Mrs. Blakeworth	
1962	Solo for Sparrow	Miss Martin	Final film role

== Bibliography ==
- Chibnall, Steve. Quota Quickies: The Birth of the British 'B' film. British Film Institute, 2007.
