= Arthur Delaney =

English painter

Arthur McEvoy Delaney (9 December 1927 – 17 April 1987) was an English painter whose scenes of Manchester life were influenced by those of L. S. Lowry, gaining some popularity since his death.

== Life and work ==
Delaney was born in 1927 in Chorlton upon Medlock, Manchester, Lancashire. He was alleged to be the illegitimate son of comedian Frank Randle (born Arthur Hughes) which DNA Matching has proven to be incorrect. His mother, Genevieve Delaney (also known as Willis (born Kelshaw)) was a music hall artiste who appeared with her sister, Mary Monica Kelshaw (also known as Lee); their act was known as Delaney and Lee.

At 13 years of age, he joined a textile design studio in Manchester where he worked for the next 32 years. He married his childhood sweetheart, Joan Campion, in 1949 and they had four children. He started to paint as a means of relaxation. There were two great influences in his life that were to effect his own development as a painter. One was the work of L. S. Lowry and the other was the memories of the happy years he spent as a boy in the Manchester of the 1930s with its smoke-laden skies, rattling tramcars and gas lamps.

Lowry's work made him aware of the many special qualities of the north and soon he began producing street scenes and industrial landscapes. His paintings were not stylised but a true likeness to their location. He set out to capture the atmosphere of the 1930s and all of his paintings capture the nostalgia of the period.

In April 1974 he held a very successful one-man show at the Tib Lane Gallery in Manchester, with all the pictures selling within half an hour at the preview. His paintings continued to sell well during his lifetime and he exhibited at the Royal Academy. Many of his paintings were produced as limited-edition prints.

In 2010 a painting by Delaney, in the style of L.S. Lowry, and painted as a homage to him, was auctioned after being seized by police from convicted fraudster Maurice Taylor. Taylor had purchased the painting for £7,500 in 2004; a signature "L S Lowry, 1964" had been added, before the painting was sold for £330,000 to a specialist dealer in Lowrys. The painting, of a snowbound Mill Street, Manchester, had been given an insurance valuation of £600,000 by the auctioneers Bonhams. The painting was said to lack fluidity, with muddy skies and with the lamp-posts wrongly highlighted in red.

Delaney died aged 59 in 1987 at the Manchester Royal Infirmary.
