= Ronald Simpson (actor) =

British actor and publicist (1896–1957)

- Born: 27 September 1896; London, England, United Kingdom
- Died: 23 September 1957 (aged 60); Aldeburgh, Suffolk, England, United Kingdom
- Occupation: Actor
- Years active: 1933–1956 (film & TV)

Ronald Maitland Simpson (1896–1957) was a British film, TV, and stage actor. He was a publicist, too, known for BBC Sunday-Night Theatre (1950). He was married to Doris Lila Muschamp.

== Selected filmography ==
- One Precious Year (1933) - (uncredited)
- The Medicine Man (1933) - Dr. Wesley Primus
- It's a Cop (1934) - Bates
- Lucky Days (1935) - Smedley
- Calling the Tune (1936) - Bramwell
- Song of Freedom (1936) - Mr. Blane, the Pianist
- Head Office (1936) - Knott
- No Escape (1936) - Scoop Martin
- The Loves of Joanna Godden (1947) - Rev. Brett
- Mine Own Executioner (1947) - Mr. Grandison
- Last Holiday (1950) - Dr. Pevensey
- The Long Dark Hall (1951) - Mary's father
- The House in the Square (1951) - Sir Joshua Reynolds (uncredited)
- The Cruel Sea (1953) - R.N. Captain
- The Last Man to Hang? (1956) - Dr. Cartwright

== Bibliography ==
- Scott Allen Nollen. Paul Robeson: Film Pioneer. McFarland, 2010.
