= John Singer (actor, born 1923) =

English actor (1923–1987)

John Harold Singer (4 December 1923 – 7 July 1987), also known as Johnny Singer, was an English actor.

Singer was born in Hastings, Sussex, England, and began as a child actor, popular in the 1930s, and known for Sweeney Todd: The Demon Barber of Fleet Street (1936). In later years he continued to act in numerous films, including In Which We Serve (1942) and The Cruel Sea (1953). He died on 7 July 1987 in Tunbridge Wells, Kent, England. His son, Steven Singer, became a TV scriptwriter.

== Filmography ==
- Further Up the Creek (1958) – as despatch rider
- Track the Man Down (1955) – as police detective (uncredited)
- Up to His Neck (1954) – as R/T rating (uncredited)
- Betrayed (1954) – as paratrooper (uncredited)
- Forbidden Cargo (1954) – as seaman (uncredited)
- The Cruel Sea (1953) – as Gray
- Come Back Peter (1953) as Ted
- The Brave Don't Cry (1952) – as Tam Stewart
- Whispering Smith Hits London (1952) – as 1st Photographer
- The Dark Man (1951) – as Captain
- School for Randle (1949) – as Ted Parker
- Poet's Pub (1949) – as Cox (uncredited)
- Haunted Palace (1949) (Short)
- It's Hard to Be Good (1948) – as Cameraman (uncredited)
- Fly Away Peter (1948) – as Ted Hapgood
- In Which We Serve (1942) – as Moran
- Front Line Kids (1942) – as Ginger Smith
- Somewhere in Camp (1942) – as Pvt. Jack Trevor
- Somewhere in England (1940) – as Bert Smith
- Riding High (1939) – as Simon (uncredited)
- Q Planes (1939) – as Newspaper Boy (uncredited)
- What a Man! (1938) – as Harold Bull
- St. Martin's Lane (1938) – as Autograph Hunter (uncredited)
- Youth at the Helm (TV Movie, 1938) – as Office Boy (credited as Johnny Singer)
- No Parking (1938) – as Boy (uncredited)
- Darts Are Trumps (1938) – as Jimmy
- If I Were Boss (1938) – as Boy (uncredited)
- The Live Wire (1937) – as Boy (uncredited)
- Smash and Grab (1937) – as Boy Who Discovers Body (uncredited)
- Mr. Smith Carries On (1937) – as Boy (uncredited)
- Strange Adventures of Mr. Smith (1937) – as Boy (uncredited)
- Don't Get Me Wrong (1937) – as Boy (uncredited)
- It's Never Too Late to Mend (1937) – as Matthew Josephs (credited as Johnny Singer)
- This'll Make You Whistle (1936) – as Small Boy With Chewing Gum (uncredited)
- Not So Dusty (1936) – as Johnny Clark
- Tudor Rose (1936) – as Boy (uncredited)
- This Green Hell (1936) – as Billy Foyle
- Sweeney Todd: The Demon Barber of Fleet Street (1936) – as Tobias Ragg (credited as Johnny Singer)
- King of the Castle (1936) – (uncredited)
- The Amateur Gentleman (1936) – as Boy (uncredited)
- Sweet Success (1936, Short) – as Boy in sweet shop (uncredited)
- Marry the Girl (1935) – as Office Boy (uncredited)
- Can You Hear Me, Mother? (1935) – as Boy (uncredited)
- Gay Old Dog (1935) – as Andrew V. Oakes (credited as Johnny Singer)
- The Price of a Song (1935) – as Boy (uncredited)
- Man of the Moment (1935) – as Small Boy (uncredited)
- The Phantom Light (1935) – as Cabin Boy (uncredited)
- Royal Cavalcade (1935) – as Boy
- Street Song (1935) – as Billy
- Dandy Dick (1935) – as Freddie
- Emil and the Detectives (1935) – as Tuesday
- My Heart Is Calling (1935) – as Page boy
- Open All Night (1934)
- My Old Dutch (1934) – as Jim as a Child
- Love at Second Sight (1934) – as Boy (uncredited)
- Something Always Happens (1934) – as Billy
- The Blue Squadron (1934) – as Boy (uncredited)
- Those Were the Days (1934) – as Boy (uncredited)
- Waltzes from Vienna (1934) – as Boy (uncredited)
- Facing the Music (1933) – as Boy (uncredited)
- The Pride of the Force (1933) – as Boy (uncredited)
- The Bermondsey Kid (1933) – as Boy (uncredited)
- I Was a Spy (1933) – as Boy (uncredited)
- Sleeping Car (1933) – as Page Boy (uncredited)
- King of the Ritz (1933) – as Pageboy
- The Crime at Blossoms (1933) – as Boy (uncredited)
- Looking on the Bright Side (1932) – as Boy (uncredited)
- Love on the Spot (1932) – as Pageboy
- Jack's the Boy (1932) – as Boy (uncredited)
- Lord Babs (1932) – as Boy (uncredited)
- The Black Hand Gang (1930) – as Boy (uncredited)
- High Treason (1929) – as Boy (uncredited)
