= Head Office (1936 film) =

- Directed by: Melville W. Brown
- Written by: Hugh Preston (novel); Melville W. Brown
- Produced by: Irving Asher
- Starring: Owen Nares; Nancy O'Neil; Arthur Margetson; Philip Ray
- Cinematography: William Luff
- Production company: Warner Brothers
- Distributed by: Warner Brothers
- Release date: November 1936
- Running time: 67 minutes
- Country: United Kingdom
- Language: English

Head Office is a 1936 British drama film directed by Melville W. Brown and starring Owen Nares, Nancy O'Neil and Arthur Margetson. Its plot involves a secretary who is wrongly accused of stealing money from the company she works for. It was made at Teddington Studios by the British subsidiary of Warner Brothers.

== Cast ==
- Owen Nares as Henry Crossman
- Nancy O'Neil as Margaret
- Arthur Margetson as Dixon
- Eileen Peel as Sheila
- Alexis France as Janie Clutterbuck
- Philip Ray as Gerrard
- Ronald Simpson as Knott
- Charles Carson as Armstrong
- Hilda Bayley as Mrs. Braham
- Bruce Lester as Halliday
- H. F. Maltby as Blenkinsop

== Bibliography ==
- Low, Rachael. Filmmaking in 1930s Britain. George Allen & Unwin, 1985.
- Wood, Linda. British Films, 1927-1939. British Film Institute, 1986.
