= Tessie O'Shea =

Welsh entertainer and actress (1913–1995)

- Born: Teresa Mary O'Shea; 13 March 1913; Cardiff, Glamorgan, Wales
- Died: 21 April 1995 (aged 82); East Lake Weir, Marion County, Florida, U.S.
- Occupation: Actress
- Years active: 1919–1985
- Spouse: David Rollo (1940)

Teresa Mary "Tessie" O'Shea (13 March 1913 – 21 April 1995) was a Welsh entertainer and actress.

== Early life ==
O'Shea was born at 61 Plantagenet Street in Riverside, Cardiff to newspaper wholesaler James Peter O'Shea, who had been a soldier and who was the son of Irish emigrants, and his wife Nellie Theresa Carr. O'Shea was reared in the British music hall tradition and performed on stage as early as age six, billed as "The Wonder of Wales". When staying at Weston-super-Mare as a child, she got lost and was only discovered when her mother heard her singing the Ernie Mayne hit, "An N'Egg and some N'Ham and some N'Onion".

== Career ==
By her teens she was known for her BBC Radio broadcasts and appeared on stages in Britain and South Africa. She frequently finished her act by singing and playing a banjolele in the style of George Formby. While appearing in Blackpool in the 1930s, she capitalised on her size by adopting "Two Ton Tessie from Tennessee" as her theme song. In the 1940s, she was a frequent headliner at the London Palladium, and established herself as a recording artist in the 1950s.

In 1963, Noël Coward created the part of the fish and chips peddler "Ada Cockle" specifically for O'Shea in his Broadway musical, The Girl Who Came to Supper. Her performance of traditional Cockney tunes charmed the critics and helped win her a Tony Award for Best Featured Actress in a Musical.

In 1963, O'Shea was a guest on The Ed Sullivan Show. She was popular enough that she came back in 1964 and shared the billing with the Beatles. Their joint appearance drew what was then the largest audience in the history of American television, helping bring her to American audiences. She was a member of the repertory company on the short-lived CBS variety show The Entertainers (1964–65). In 1968, O'Shea was cast in the television movie The Strange Case of Dr. Jekyll and Mr. Hyde, which earned her an Emmy Award nomination for Outstanding Performance by an Actress in a Supporting Role in a Drama.

In December 1970 and January 1971, she entertained American troops in Vietnam with versions of her musical act. On 24 December 1970 she performed for troops at Long Binh and took time afterwards to greet each soldier and wish them "Happy Christmas".

O'Shea starred in a short-lived British sitcom As Good Cooks Go, which ran from 1969 to 1970. She appeared in films including London Town, The Blue Lamp, The Shiralee, The Russians Are Coming, the Russians Are Coming, and Bedknobs and Broomsticks. She regularly appeared on BBC Television's long running variety show, The Good Old Days.

== Death and legacy ==
O'Shea died of congestive heart failure at age 82, at her home in East Lake Weir, Marion County, Florida.

O'Shea's life was celebrated in the BBC Two documentary Two Ton Tessie!, first broadcast in March 2011.

== Filmography ==
Year	Title	Role	Notes
1944	The Way Ahead	Herself	
1946	London Town	Herself	
1948	Holidays with Pay	Pansy Rogers	
1948	Somewhere in Politics	Daisy Smart	
1950	The Blue Lamp	Herself	
1957	The Shiralee	Bella	
1966	The Russians Are Coming, the Russians Are Coming	Alice Foss	
1969	The Best House in London	Singer	
1971	Bedknobs and Broomsticks	Mrs. Hobday	
1978	The Word	Herself	
