= Sometimes Good =

1934 film by W. P. Kellino

- Directed by: W.P. Kellino
- Screenplay by: Michael Barringer
- Produced by: Fred Browett
- Starring: Henry Kendall; Nancy O'Neil; Minnie Rayner
- Cinematography: Jimmy Wilson
- Production company: Grafton Films
- Release date: 24 December 1934
- Running time: 68 minutes
- Country: United Kingdom
- Language: English

Sometimes Good is a 1934 British comedy film directed by W. P. Kellino and starring Henry Kendall, Nancy O'Neil and Minnie Rayner. It was written by Michael Barringer and was made as a quota quickie.

== Preservation status ==
The British Film Institute National Archive holds a collection of ephemera and stills but no film or video materials.

== Plot ==
Department store assistant Millie Tarrant gives up her job and goes to stay with her aunt, caretaker of a large mansion owned by Colonel Mortimer. Pretending to be the niece of the Colonel, Millie falls in love with Paul Everard, son of her former employer.

== Cast ==
- Henry Kendall as Paul Everard
- Nancy O'Neil as Millie Tarrant
- Minnie Rayner as Jessica Mallory
- Hal Gordon as Michael Trout
- Charles Mortimer as John Everard
- Madeline Seymour as Mrs. Everard
- Jimmy Godden as Colonel Mortimer
- Edna Davies as Ella Tyfield
- Gladys Jennings as Mrs. Smyth-Jenkins

== Reception ==
The Daily Film Renter wrote: "Just another quota picture with novelettish story of shopgirl's masquerade to win son of former employer. Staged in department store, apartment and country mansion interiors, film uneventful, but scores with humorous interludes, due mainly to engaging nonchalance of Henry Kendall in leading role. ... Passable fare for smaller popular halls and very uncritical patrons. It is difficult to work up much enthusiasm for this effort, which, cast in the novelette vein, progresses to a climax that can be seen early on."

Picturegoer wrote: "Henry Kendall and Minnie Raynor do their best to impart life to this wholly ingenuous and novelettish story. It is very hackneyed in construction and theme and it says something for the stars that they are able to make it even as good as it is."
