= Arthur Worsley =

British ventriloquist (1920–2001)

- Worsley with his dummy, 'Charlie Brown'
- Born: Arthur Wilkinson Worsley; 16 October 1920; Failsworth, Lancashire, England, United Kingdom
- Died: 19 July 2001 (aged 80); Blackpool, Lancashire, England, United Kingdom
- Resting place: Carleton Cemetery, Blackpool
- Occupation: Ventriloquist
- Years active: 1931−1983

Arthur Wilkinson Worsley (16 October 1920 – 19 July 2001) was a British ventriloquist who appeared regularly on British television from the 1950s to the 1970s. His act with dummy Charlie Brown had Charlie do all the talking, while Worsley himself remained "silent".

== Early years ==
He was born in Failsworth, near Manchester, Lancashire. At the age of eight he saw a ventriloquist for the first time which gave him the ambition to become a ventriloquist himself.

== Career ==
Worsley made his first stage appearance at age 11 at the Casino, Rusholme, Manchester, billed as the "World's Youngest Ventriloquist".

His London debut took place four years later. He was soon playing at principal theatres around the country and later around the world. In the days of live variety, he was a regular at the UK's top venue, the London Palladium. He became well known in Australia, New Zealand, South Africa and the US. He appeared on most of the variety shows on British TV and was one of the few British acts who achieved success in the US, appearing on The Ed Sullivan Show in the United States returning to perform a variation of his act for ten years in a row.

He was called "the greatest ventriloquist in the world" by Ed Sullivan, who hired him to appear in what turned out to be the third and last appearance by singer Elvis Presley on his show, on 6 January 1957, a program which was broadcast live from the old CBS Studio 50 in New York City and drawing some 50 million TV viewers, as revealed by Trendex figures the week after.

== Technique ==
Ed Sullivan admired Worsley's ventriloquism act because, in addition to being funny, Worsley's technique was so perfect that he could appear in tight close-up exhibiting no discernible lip movements while his "figure" (dummy) appeared to be speaking.

It is almost impossible to form the plosive consonants "B" and "P" without some movement of the lips; ventriloquists traditionally substitute another consonant. As part of Worsley's act, his dummy would shout the phrase "Bottle of beer!" repeatedly while Worsley's lips remained motionless; invariably, this brought a round of applause.

== Act ==
All the talking was done by his dummy Charlie Brown, who would turn to the impassive Worsley and say, "Look at me, son, when I'm talking to you". For most of Worsley's act, Charlie would abuse him, growing ever more exasperated by the ventriloquist's silence. Worsley would accept Charlie's tirades with a Buster Keaton-like implacability, on rare occasions a barely detectable rise of the eyebrow, on still rarer ones a slight smirk.

In due time, Charlie would work himself up into a frenzy and start shrieking at Worsley. Not only was this funny, it also allowed Worsley to show off his skills.

== Personal life ==
He married Audrey (née Hewitt), a stage performer. They had one son, Michael.

== Later years ==
He retired from the stage at the age of 63 in 1983 and never performed with Charlie again. He died in 2001 in Blackpool, Lancashire, aged 80 and is buried at Carleton Cemetery, Blackpool, in plot E794.
