= Onchan Head railway station =

Railway station in Isle of Man, the UK

Onchan Head Kione Connaghyn
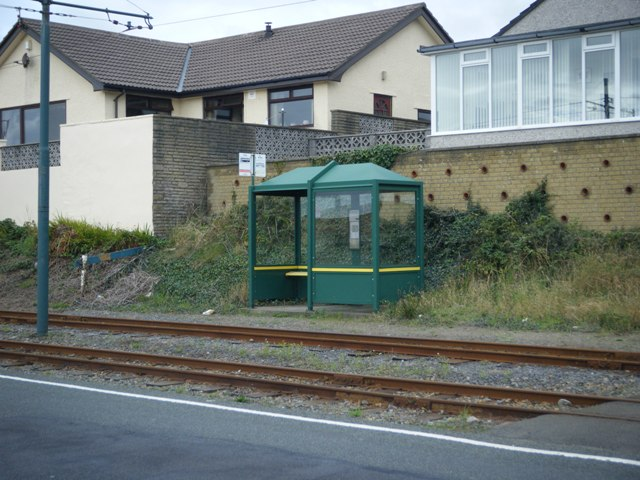

General information
- Location: Onchan, Isle Of Man
- Coordinates: 54°10′07″N 4°26′56″W
- Pole No.: 033-034
- System: Manx Electric Railway
- Owner: Isle Of Man Railways
- Platforms: Ground Level
- Tracks: Running (Incl. Crossover)

History
- Opened: 1893
- Former names: Manx Electric Railway Co.
Location

Onchan Head Halt (Manx: Stadd Chione Connaghyn) (occasionally marketed as "White City" in conjunction with the nearby pleasure grounds) was once the first official stopping place on the Manx Electric Railway on the Isle of Man and is less than one mile from the southern terminus of the line.

== Origins ==
The halt was opened in the earliest years of the tramway to serve the then new White City pleasure grounds and the nearby beach at Happy Valley, although not appearing in much of the timetable literature for the first years its popularity was such that it eventually became an official stopping place and remains so today. The area was one of the first on the island to be lit by electricity, using the supply from the electric railway. One of the original lamp standards was moved to a heritage area in Onchan Village known as The Butt in 1987 and restored to original condition.

== Structures ==
In the earliest years of the railway this station was furnished with a staffed booking office, such was the popularity of the location that this was staffed for several years, despite its close proximity to the terminus. It was accompanied by the turn of the twentieth century by a covered accommodation for waiting passengers. However, when the resort declined in popularity these facilities were removed in 1978.

== Environs ==
In line with management changes in the late 1990s, a modern bus shelter was erected here in 1999 serving both the railway and bus services in the area, in keeping with the management policy to provide shelter at as many wayside locations as possible. At this time the station also lost its hand-painted station nameboard in favour of a modern bus stop-type sign; until the summer of 2009 a painted bench remained in situ as a reminder of the old days. To the side of the station is a pedestrian footpath serving the nearby housing estate, and the station is demarcated by a token piece of fencing at its southernmost end.

== White City ==
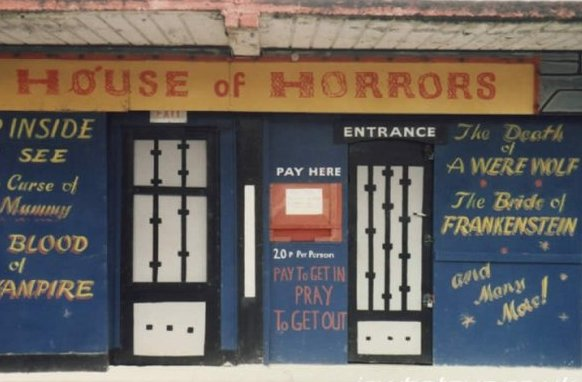
White City (After Closure)

This area was once a popular destination for holidaymakers and for many years as it served the nearby White City pleasure grounds, which were closed in the early 1980s. Despite the closure of the resort the station has remained open but today largely serves only local traffic. Despite seeing little use, the station still has its own run-round loop which facilitated trams on short workings to return to the depot on the correct running line, as for many years short workings shuttled between Derby Castle Station and here, such was the demand of the amusement park with its wooden roller coaster and traditional attractions such as a ghost train and dodgems.

The resort declined in the 1970s and the coaster was replaced with a multi-lane plastic slide when the former became unsafe. Latterly, the area was utilised by a BMX racing club before being given over to redevelopment in the 1990s and it now houses a large block of apartments as well as some detached private dwellings, all served by a loop road which surrounds the estate, installed in 1897 when the original amusement park was developed.

== Route ==
| Preceding station | Manx Electric Railway | Following station |
|---|---|---|
| Port Jack towards Derby Castle | Douglas–Ramsey | Café Royale towards Ramsey Station |

== See also ==
- Manx Electric Railway Stations
- Onchan

== Sources ==
- Manx Electric Railway Stopping Places (2002) Manx Electric Railway Society
- Island Images: Manx Electric Railway Pages (2003) Jon Wornham
- Official Tourist Department Page (2009) Isle Of Man Heritage Railways
