= Charles Carson (actor) =

British actor (1885–1977)

- Charles Carson in Dark Journey 1937
- Born: 16 August 1885; London, England
- Died: 5 August 1977 (aged 91); London, England
- Occupation: Actor
- Years active: 1919–1972
- Spouse: Bertha Kathleen Elmes

Charles Carson (16 August 1885 – 5 August 1977) was a British actor. A civil engineer before taking to the stage in 1919, his theatre work included directed plays for ENSA during World War II.

In 1960, he appeared in the television series Danger Man in the episode "The Key" as the Ambassador.

== Selected filmography ==
- The Loves of Ariane (1931) – The Professor
- Dreyfus (1931) – Colonel Picquart
- Many Waters (1931) – Henry Delauney
- The Chinese Puzzle (1932) – Armand de Rochecorbon
- Monsieur Albert (1932) – Mr. Robertson
- Men of Tomorrow (1932) – Senior Proctor
- Leap Year (1932) – Sir Archibald Mallard
- There Goes the Bride (1932) – M. Marquand (uncredited)
- Marry Me (1932) – Korten
- The Blarney Stone (1933) – Sir Arthur
- The Shadow (1933) – Sir Edward Hulme KC
- The Perfect Flaw (1934) – Henry Kearns
- Trouble in Store (1934, short) – Sanderson
- Whispering Tongues (1934) – Roger Mayland
- The Broken Melody (1934) – Colonel Dubonnet
- No Escape (1934) – Mr. Arnold
- Blossom Time (1934) – Frederick Lafont
- Father and Son (1934) – Colin Bolton
- Blind Justice (1934) – Dr. Naylor
- Hyde Park (1934) – Lord Lenbridge
- Invitation to the Waltz (1935) – Lombardi
- D'Ye Ken John Peel? (1935) – Francis Merrall
- Sanders of the River (1935) – Governor of the Territory
- Abdul the Damned (1935) – General Hilmi-Pasha
- Moscow Nights (1935) – Officer of Defense
- Scrooge (1936) – Middlemark
- Things to Come (1936) – Great Grandfather
- One in a Million (1936) – President
- Forget Me Not (1936) – George Arnold
- Secret Agent (1936) – 'R'
- The Beloved Vagabond (1936) – Charles Rushworth
- Rhythm in the Air (1936) – George, Building Manager
- Head Office (1936) – Armstrong
- Talk of the Devil (1936) – Lord Dymchurch
- Fire Over England (1937) – Admiral Valdez
- Cafe Colette (1937)
- Dark Journey (1937) – Head of Fifth Bureau
- Dreaming Lips (1937) – Impresario
- Secret Lives (1937) – Henri
- Glamorous Night (1937) – Otto
- The Angelus (1937) – John Ware
- Old Mother Riley (1937) – Counsel for Prosecution
- Victoria the Great (1937) – Sir Robert Peel
- Saturday Night Revue (1937) – Mr. Dorland
- Oh Boy! (1938) – Governor
- No Parking (1938) – Hardcastle
- We're Going to Be Rich (1938) – Keeler
- Sixty Glorious Years (1938) – Sir Robert Peel
- The Return of the Frog (1938) – Chief Commissioner
- The Gang's All Here (1939) – Charles Cartwright
- Inspector Hornleigh (1939) – Chief Superintendent (uncredited)
- The Saint in London (1939) – Mr. Morgan
- Inspector Hornleigh on Holiday (1939) – Chief Superintendent (uncredited)
- The Lion Has Wings (1939) – Anti-aircraft Officer
- Spare a Copper (1940) – Admiral
- Quiet Wedding (1941) – Mr. Johnson
- The Common Touch (1941) – Haywood
- Penn of Pennsylvania (1942) – Admiral Penn
- They Flew Alone (1942) – Lord Wakefield
- The Adventures of Tartu (1943) – Arthur Wakefield (uncredited)
- The Dummy Talks (1943) – Marvello
- Battle for Music (1945) – Mr. Wheeler
- Pink String and Sealing Wax (1945) – Editor
- Two Guys from Milwaukee (1946) – Minor Role (uncredited)
- The Lady with a Lamp (1951)
- Cry, the Beloved Country (1951) – James Jarvis
- Moulin Rouge (1952) – Count Moïse de Camondo
- The Master of Ballantrae (1953) – Colonel Banks (uncredited)
- Duel in the Jungle (1954) – Skipper
- Beau Brummell (1954) – Sir Geoffrey Baker
- The Dam Busters (1955) – Doctor
- An Alligator Named Daisy (1955) – Wilfred Smethers (uncredited)
- Reach for the Sky (1956) – Air Chief Marshal Sir Hugh Dowding
- The Silken Affair (1956) – Judge
- Let's Be Happy (1957) – Mr. Ferguson, lawyer
- Bobbikins (1959) – Sir Jason Crandall
- A Touch of Larceny (1959) – Robert Holland
- The Trials of Oscar Wilde (1960) – Justice Charles
- Sands of the Desert (1960) – Philpotts
- A Story of David (1961) – Ahimilech
- The Three Lives of Thomasina (1963) – Doctor Strathsea
- Curse of the Fly (1965) – Inspector Charas
- Lady Caroline Lamb (1972) – Potter (final film role)

== Television ==
Year	Title	Role	Notes
1960	The Voodoo Factor	Captain Ross	3 episodes
1960	Alfred Hitchcock Presents	Party Guest	Episode: "The Baby-Blue Expression"
1960	Biggles	Sundsvall	3 episodes
1960	Danger Man	Ambassador	Episode: "The Key"
1962	Probation Officer	Basil Thackeray	1 episode
1962	The Avengers	Brigadier Williamson	Episode: "Bullseye"
1963	Crane	Jean Collard	Episode: "Three Days to Die"
1963	Moonstrike	Count Guy de Beaugard	Episode: "The Bells Are Silent"
1963	Emergency Ward 10	George Ryder	4 episodes
1965	Danger Man	George	Episode: "A Very Dangerous Game"
1967	Champion House	Herbert Clay	Episode: "Before a Fall"
1968	Frontier	President of Court	Episode: "Dasturi"
