= Nicolette Roeg =

British actress and singer (1925–1987)

- Born: Joan Nicolette Roeg; 9 February 1925; Marylebone, London, England
- Died: 5 November 1987 (aged 62)
- Occupation(s): Actress, singer
- Years active: 1940s–1970s
- Spouses: Leslie Lyons (m. 1946); Barry Sinclair (m. 1949)
- Children: Belinda Sinclair
- Relatives: Nicolas Roeg (brother)

Joan Nicolette Roeg (9 February 1925 – 5 November 1987) was a British stage, film and television actress and singer, active from the mid-1940s to the 1970s. She appeared in several British films and many television series, She was the older sister of cinematographer and film director Nicolas Roeg.

== Early life ==
Nicolette Roeg was born on 9 February 1925 in Marylebone, London, the daughter of Jack Nicolas Roeg and Mabel Gertrude (née Silk). Her younger brother was Nicolas Roeg (1928–2018), who became one of Britain's leading cinematographers and film directors.

== Career ==
Roeg began her acting career in post-war British cinema and stage productions. Her earliest known film credit is Home Sweet Home (1945), for which she was described as "Nicolette Roeg, the singing ingénue of Home Sweet Home". She also worked in cabaret, musicals and drama as well as radio and TV, including several early TV shows, such as Granada's Two's Company in 1956.

She later starred as Nancy in Oliver! at the New Theatre in London between 1963 and 1966. For the Decca recording of Belle, or, The Ballad of Doctor Crippen (1961) in which she appeared, Broadway.com commented that the "catchiest tune is 'Meet Me at the Strand,' delivered by the Bedford's principal lady, Jenny, played by belter Nicolette Roeg, who would go on to several years of duty as Oliver!'s Nancy."

From the 1950s to the 1970s she worked steadily in British television, often in small character roles. Among the programmes in which she appeared are Z-Cars, On the Buses, The Onedin Line, Dixon of Dock Green, and the BBC science-fiction series Survivors. She also appeared in Blake's 7.

== Selected appearances ==
=== Theatre ===
- Madame Louise (1946), Bristol Hippodrome and Kings Theatre, Southsea, as Penny
- The Happy Marriage (1953), Theatre Royal, Bath, Dudley Hippodrome
- Belle, or, The Ballad of Doctor Crippen (1961), Strand Theatre, London, as Jenny Pearl
- Fiorello! (original West End production, 1962), Bristol Old Vic – Theatre Royal, Piccadilly Theatre, London, as Marie Fischer
- Oliver! (1963–1966), New Theatre, as Nancy
- The Country Wife (1968), New Theatre, Oxford, Alexandra Theatre, Birmingham, as Mrs Dainty Fidget
- Relatively Speaking (1969), Watford Palace Theatre, as Sheila

=== Film ===
- Home Sweet Home (1945), as Jacqueline Chantry
- Under New Management (1946), as Brenda Evans
- I'll Turn to You (1946), as Flora Fenton
- All the Right Noises (1970), as Millie

=== Radio ===
- Afternoon Theatre – "A Dead Man on Leave. The Life, Times and Death of Eugen Levini, 1883-1919" (1974), as singer

=== Television ===
- The Passing Show: Part 3: 1920-1929: The Turbulent Twenties (1951), as Vicky Schofield
- Z-Cars, series 6, episodes 345 & 346, "Give and Take" (1970), as Patsy Cartright
- Dixon of Dock Green, series 16, episode 2, "Breaking Point" (1969), as Miss Singer
- On the Buses, series 6, episode 6, "Bye Bye Blakey" (1972), as The Lady Doctor
- The Onedin Line (1970s) as Ada Gamble
- Survivors, series 3, episode 7, "The Peacemaker" (1977), as Blossom
- The Expert, series 3, episode 2, "Where Are You Going?" (1971), as Pamela Rowlandson
- Blake's 7, series 2, episode 11, "Gambit" (1979), as Chenie

and many others.

== Personal life ==
Roeg married Leslie Lyons in 1946. She married actor Barry Sinclair on 8 July 1949. Their daughter, Belinda Sinclair (born 1950), also became an actress.

== Death ==
Roeg died on 5 November 1987, aged 62.
