= As Good Cooks Go =

- Genre: Sitcom
- Starring: Tessie O'Shea; Frank Williams; Robert Dorning
- Country of origin: United Kingdom
- No. of episodes: 6 (all missing)

Production
- Running time: 30 minutes

Original release
- Network: BBC1
- Release: 5 May 1969 – 25 February 1970

As Good Cooks Go is a colour British sitcom that aired on BBC1 from 1969 to 1970. Written by John Warren, and John Singer, it starred Tessie O'Shea and Frank Williams.

== Cast ==
- Tessie O'Shea – Blodwen O'Reilly
- Robert Dorning – Mr Bullock (pilot)
- Frank Williams – Mr Bullock (series)

== Plot ==
Blodwen O'Reilly is a cook who works in many different establishments. She turns a transport café into a quality restaurant, works in an Army canteen and prepares meals in an old people's home.

== Episodes ==
=== Pilot (1969) ===
- Pilot (5 May 1969) (part of Comedy Playhouse)

=== Series One (1970) ===
1. Episode One (28 January 1970)
2. Episode Two (4 February 1970)
3. Episode Three (11 February 1970)
4. Episode Four (18 February 1970)
5. Episode Five (25 February 1970)
6. Episode Six (4 March 1970)

As was BBC practice at the time, all of the episodes were later junked in the late 1970s, and none are known to survive as of 2026.
