= Home Sweet Home (1945 film) =

- Directed by: John E. Blakeley
- Written by: Story And Scenario: Roney Parsons; Anthony Toner; Comedy Scenes devised & arranged by: Arthur Mertz
- Produced by: John E. Blakeley
- Starring: Frank Randle
- Cinematography: Geoffrey Faithfull
- Edited by: V. Sagovsky
- Music by: Percival Mackey
- Production companies: Mancunian Films & Butcher's Film Service (co-production)
- Distributed by: Butcher's Film Service (U.K.)
- Release date: 29 October 1945 (U.K.)
- Running time: 92 minutes
- Country: United Kingdom
- Language: English

Home Sweet Home is a 1945 British musical comedy film directed by John E. Blakeley and starring Frank Randle, Nicolette Roeg (sister of director Nicolas Roeg) and Tony Pendrell. It was written by Roney Parsons and Anthony Toner. Set in the fictitious town of Redvale, the film is largely a vehicle for slapstick routines by Randle.

== Plot ==
Spirited orphan Jacqueline Chantry is the chauffeuse to wealthy Colonel Wright and his family. Son Eric Wright and Jacqueline fall in love and plan to marry, but the class conscious Colonel's wife refuses to give her blessing. Saddened, Jacqueline packs her bags and leaves, eventually becoming a successful nightclub singer. Eric chases after her, but she's lodging in the house of Frank, a likeable chap who discovers that Jacqueline is in reality a wealthy heiress. He goes to some lengths to help the pair of lovers, and the film ends happily.

== Cast ==
- Nicolette Roeg as Jacqueline Chantry
- Frank Randle as Frank
- Tony Pendrell as Eric Wright
- H. F. Maltby as Colonel Wright
- Hilda Bayley as Mrs. Wright
- Cecil Fredericks as Webster
- Stan Little as young Herbert
- Bunty Meadows as Bunty
- Gerhard Kempinski as Pagoli
- George Merritt as Dr. Handy
- Howard Douglas as Martin, the butler
- Iris Vandeleur as Mrs. Jones
- Esma Lewis as Mrs. Luck
- Vincent Holman as the parson
- Lily Lapidus as welfare worker
- Ben Williams as reporter
- Max Melford as policeman
- Rawicz and Landauer as themselves

== Critical reception ==
Kine Weekly called the film "a strong combination of robust box-office comedy with powerful radio and variety appeal.

The Monthly Film Bulletin wrote: "Frank Randle wends his way through an impossible plot with his familiar brand of slap-stick comedy and usually manages to leave a trail of laughs behind him, particularly at the beginning, when he confuses the birth of Quads to his wife with the four puppies his son brings home."

Picture Show wrote: "Jovial knockabout comedy ... Boisterous fun, with first-rate musical interludes by Rawicz and Landauer, who appear at a factory concert, and good work from the supporting cast."

In British Sound Films: The Studio Years 1928–1959 David Quinlan rated the film as "average", writing: "Unsophisticated farce-musical, sometimes quite funny."

Sky Movies gave it two out of five stars, concluding the film was "Only mild entertainment even when it was made and rather dated now".

The reviewer for TV Guide wrote: "It passes the time, but it's not especially memorable."
