= Jack Ahoy =

- Directed by: Walter Forde
- Written by: Gerard Fairlie; Sidney Gilliat; Leslie Arliss; Jack Hulbert; Gerard Fairlie
- Based on: a story by Sidney Gilliat & J. O. C. Orton
- Produced by: Michael Balcon
- Starring: Jack Hulbert
- Cinematography: Bernard Knowles
- Edited by: Ian Dalrymple
- Music by: Bretton Byrd (uncredited)
- Production company: Gaumont-British Picture Corporation
- Release date: February 1934
- Running time: 70 minutes
- Country: United Kingdom
- Language: English

Jack Ahoy is a 1934 British comedy film directed by Walter Forde and starring Jack Hulbert, Nancy O'Neil, Alfred Drayton and Sam Wilkinson." Its plot follows a humble seaman who falls in love with an Admiral's daughter whilst trying to battle Chinese pirates. The film was loosely remade in 1954 as Up to His Neck.

== Plot ==
After failing to pass his entrance exam to Dartmouth Naval College, Jack Ponsonby enlists as an able seaman. On falling in love with the admiral's daughter Patricia, Jack stumbles into an adventure involving a den of Chinese river pirates who have stolen a British submarine. Anxious to prove himself a hero in Patricia's eyes, he manages to rescue both the admiral and his daughter, when they are kidnapped by the bandits.

== Cast ==
- Jack Hulbert as Jack Ponsonby
- Nancy O'Neil as Patricia Fraser
- Alfred Drayton as Admiral Fraser
- Tamara Desni as Conchita
- Henry Peterson as Larios
- Sam Wilkinson as Dodger

== Critical reception ==
The New York Times called it "An engaging bit of nonsense, acted to the point of sheer physical exhaustion by Mr. Hulbert and his companions, the picture can be recommended as a refreshing escape from the more serious things of life and the cinema"

The Radio Times gave the film three out of five stars, and wrote, "Hulbert sings 'The Hat's on the Side of My Head' and gets kidnapped by Chinese revolutionaries! There's a nice pace and an easy-going air of geniality brought to this maritime caper by skilled director Walter Forde, and its sheer breeziness is infectious."
