= Far End Halt =

Railway station in Isle of Man, the UK

Far End Far End
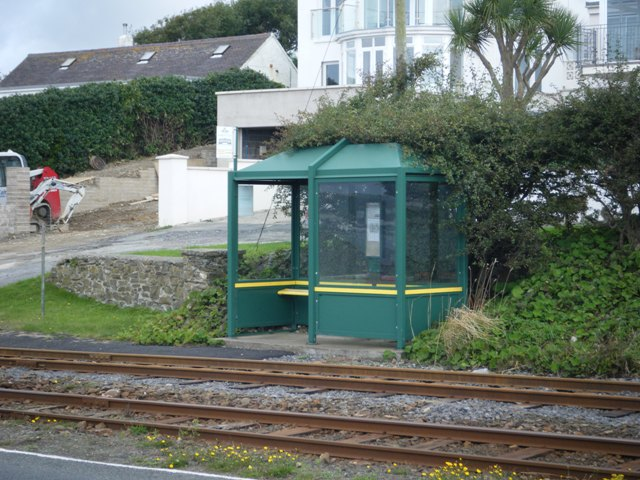

General information
- Location: Onchan, Isle Of Man
- Coordinates: 54.170059°N 4.434180°W
- Pole No.: 065-066
- System: Manx Electric Railway
- Owner: Isle Of Man Railways
- Platforms: Ground Level
- Tracks: Two Running Lines

Construction
- Structure type: Bus Shelter
- Parking: None

History
- Opened: 1893
- Former names: Manx Electric Railway Co.
Location

Far End Halt (Manx: Stadd Far End) is a stopping place on the Manx Electric Railway on the Isle of Man and is located on the climb towards the line's first summit.

== Origins ==
It gains its name from the imposing house adjacent to the running lines which is the last building on the stretch of coastline before reaching Groudle Glen itself which is inland. The houses along this stretch of road are impressive constructions and "Far End House" was one of the largest. The houses were generally, as now, the residences of the well-to-do and the area had a reputation for its rich residents.

== House ==
Having been finally vacated at some point in the 1990s the imposing property that lies beneath road level has remained empty for several years and proposals have been lodged for its demolition and the subsequent redevelopment of the site, but no such plans have come to fruition. The proposed redevelopment would also involve the large plot of land to the north of the house from which the halt takes its name.

== Today ==
The tram stop has retained its name for over a century and after this point the line becomes more exposed to the winds from the sea, this being the farthest end of the built-up area of Onchan now, but when the line was built the area was an exposed coastal headland, very similar to the landscape of the line after this point.

== Route ==
Preceding station	Manx Electric Railway	Following station
Braeside towards Derby Castle	Douglas–Ramsey	Howstrake Camp towards Ramsey Station

== See also ==
Manx Electric Railway Stations

== Sources ==
- Manx Electric Railway Stopping Places (2002) Manx Electric Railway Society
- Island Images: Manx Electric Railway Pages (2003) Jon Wornham
- Official Tourist Department Page (2009) Isle Of Man Heritage Railways
