= Onchan =

Village on the Isle of Man

Coordinates: 54.175°N 4.455°W

Onchan: Manx: Kione Droghad
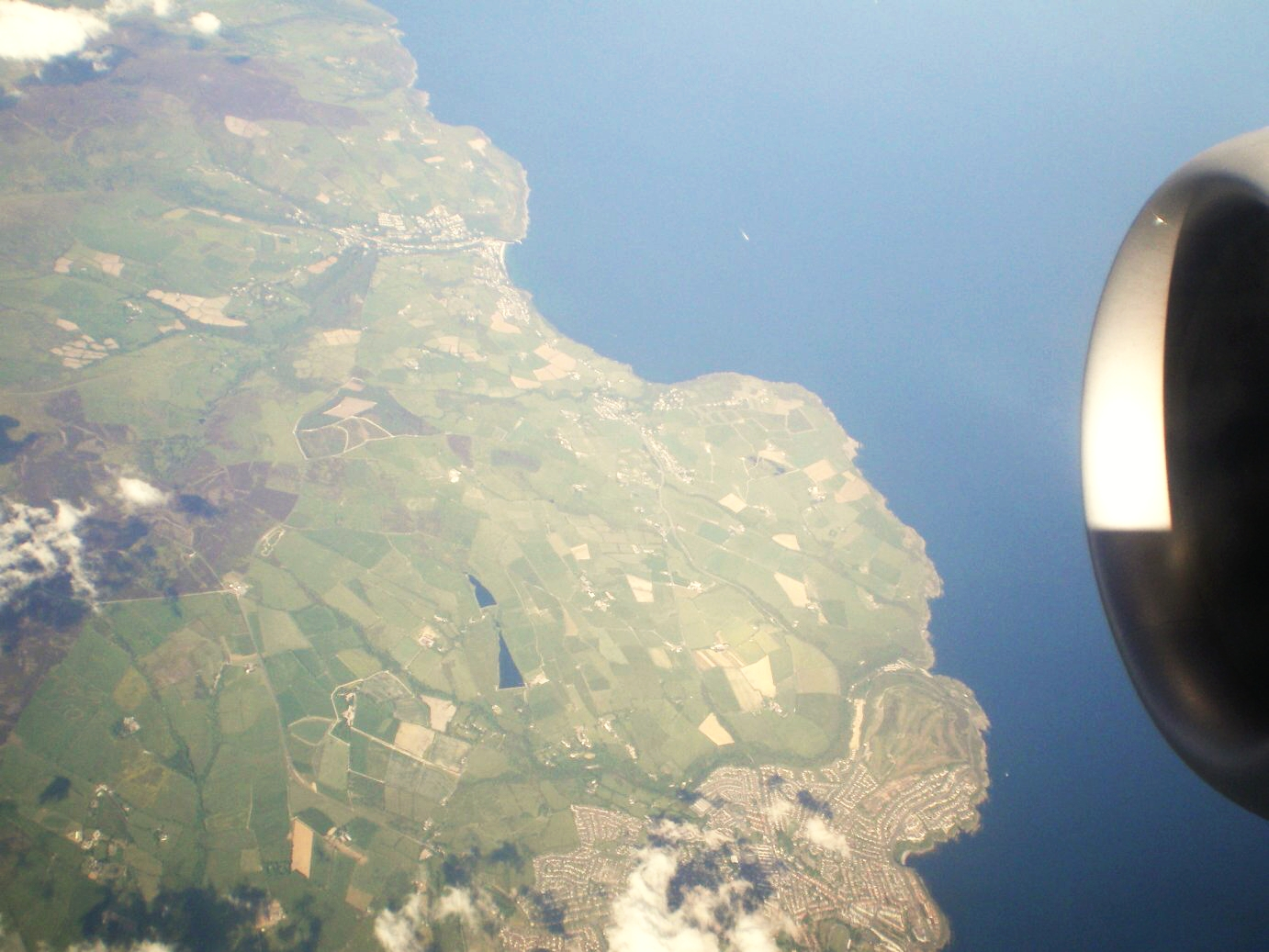
- Aerial view of Onchan and Laxey

- Location within the Isle of Man
- Population: 9,172 (2006 census)
- OS grid reference: SC407780
- Parish: Onchan
- Sheading: Middle
- Crown dependency: Isle of Man
- Post town: Isle of Man
- Postcode district: IM3
- Dialling code: 01624
- Police: Isle of Man
- Fire: Isle of Man
- Ambulance: Isle of Man
- House of Keys: Onchan Garff

Onchan (/ˈɔːŋkən/; Manx: Kione Droghad) is a large village in the parish of Onchan on the Isle of Man. It is at the north end of Douglas Bay. Administratively a district, it has the second largest population of settlements on the island, after Douglas, with which it forms a conurbation.

In Manx the name for the village is Kione Droghad meaning "bridge end".

== Early history ==
In the 1890s, a 5,000-year-old stone age axe was found in the Cassa Field by Onchan wetlands. In the Viking reign Onchan became part of Middle sheading. The name of the village is identified with St Connachan who was Bishop of Sodor and Man in 540 and the church named after him, Kirk Coonachan. An early name for the village is Manx: Kiondroghad which literally translated means "bridgehead". The earliest written record of Kiondroghad was in the 1643 Manorial Roll, when it was very small. The name Kiondroghad appeared on the 1841 census but not the one in 1851.

== The Butt ==
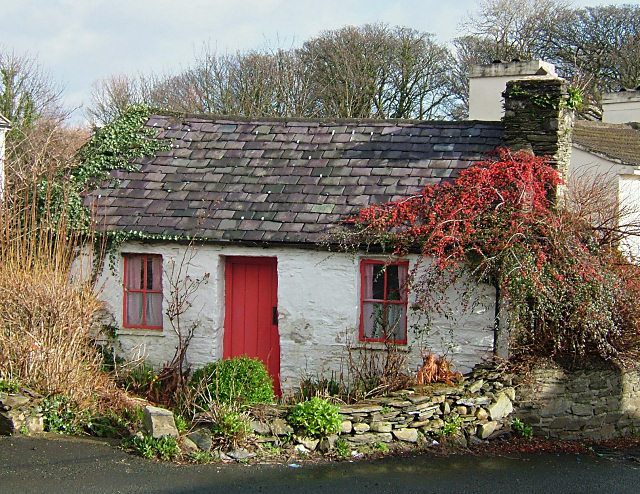
Molly Carooin's Cottage

Gradually the village spread beyond Church Road, known locally as The Butt. At the junction with the track that led towards the mountains (Avondale Road) a few more cottages appeared in the early 19th century. In the late 19th century land was sold off for terraces of houses to be built. The area surrounding Church Road is today the village's heritage area and the location of Molly Carooin's Cottage, which is maintained by the Friends Of Onchan's Heritage, a local volunteer group. The area features period lamp standards, and since 2001 has been home to the newly developed Village Green which links Church Road with the Onchan Wetlands to the north west. There is also a vehicle garage, a highways department depot, a barber shop and several residential dwellings in the area which leads to St Peter's Church via the one-way road. The Jubilee Lamp was erected in this road in 1987 after relocation from White City, and this was the first electrically lit lamp standard on the island.

== 20th century development ==
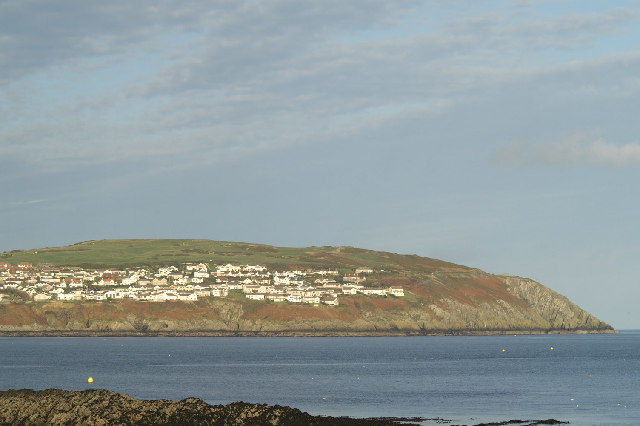
Onchan Head from the sea

In the early 20th century the Port Jack area was being developed in connection with the Douglas Bay Estate Company's promotion of land sales on the Howstrake Farm. They also built an electric urban railway which later became a coastal railway to Ramsey. There was then a mixture of private houses, terraced houses and guest houses to take the overflow of visitors to Douglas. There was further development in the 1930s. During the Victorian and Edwardian tourism boom Onchan made a bid to become the island's second resort, encouraging the building of hotels and guest houses. The Manx Electric Railway was constructed in 1893, but never achieved its goal of connecting with the heart of Douglas for commuter journeys. In the early 20th century Lower Onchan, around the Port Jack area, was the first area on the island to have electric-powered street lighting, powered by the Manx Electric Railway generators. After World War II development gradually continued, and in the 1960s the village commissioners built local authority housing.

== Government House ==
The official residence of the Lieutenant Governor of the Isle of Man, the representative on the Isle of Man of the Lord of Mann, currently King Charles III, is Government House on Governor's Road. Originally named Bemahague House, the house was leased to Governor Henry Brougham Loch in 1865, and purchased by the Isle of Man Government in 1903 as the official residence for the Sovereign's representative.

== Transport ==
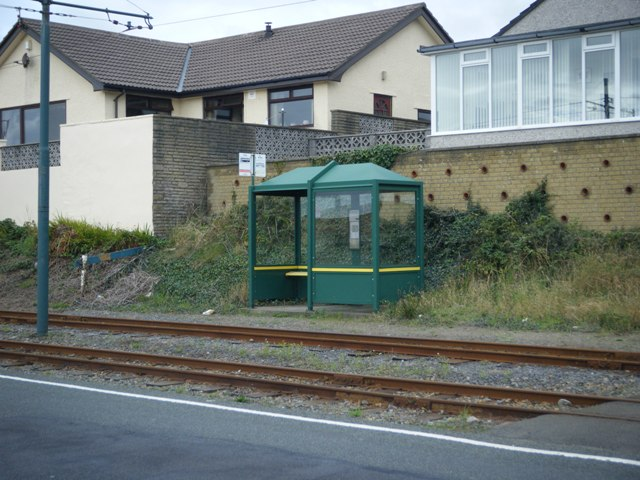
Onchan Head Station

There are ten Manx Electric Railway stops in Onchan. Onchan Head railway station was the first official stop on the line and served the former White City pleasure grounds. There are also stops at Port Jack Halt, Gandhi Indian Restaurant, the former Majestic Hotel, Braeside, Far End, Howstrake, Groudle Old Road, Groudle Glen and Eskadale. The village has a frequent bus service of Bus Vannin: there are several local services in Onchan and Douglas; these serve the various housing estates including Ballachrink, Lakeside Gardens, Birch Hill and Governor's Hill. The last of these is in Douglas, but through services often link all estates. There is now a regular through service to Nobles Hospital, north-west of Douglas. Onchan is also served by buses to Laxey and Ramsey as well as by local taxi firms.

== Religion ==
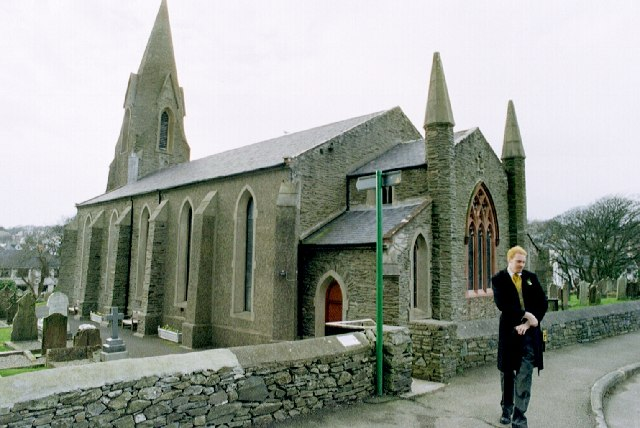
St Peter's Church

The Church of England parish church in Onchan is St Peter's on Church Road. The original church, dedicated to St Conchan, dated back to the 12th century. By 1760 the walls and roof had become dangerous and it was condemned in 1771. But nothing was done until the Bishop of Sodor and Man, Bishop Ward commissioned a new church. Its foundation stone was laid in 1830, but due to pressures from the parishioners, it was moved to its current position. The church was built by John Samuel Skillicorn, and was consecrated in 1833. It was dedicated to Saint Peter. The church was refurbished in 1863. In 1897 it was the first church on the island to be lit by electricity, to celebrate the Diamond Jubilee of Queen Victoria; the electricity was supplied by the Isle of Man Tramways and Power Company. St Anthony's Roman Catholic Church is located on Ridgeway Road. Onchan Methodist Church, part of the Douglas and Peel circuit, is on Main Road. Onchan Baptist Church is on Whitebridge Road.

== Facilities and accommodation ==
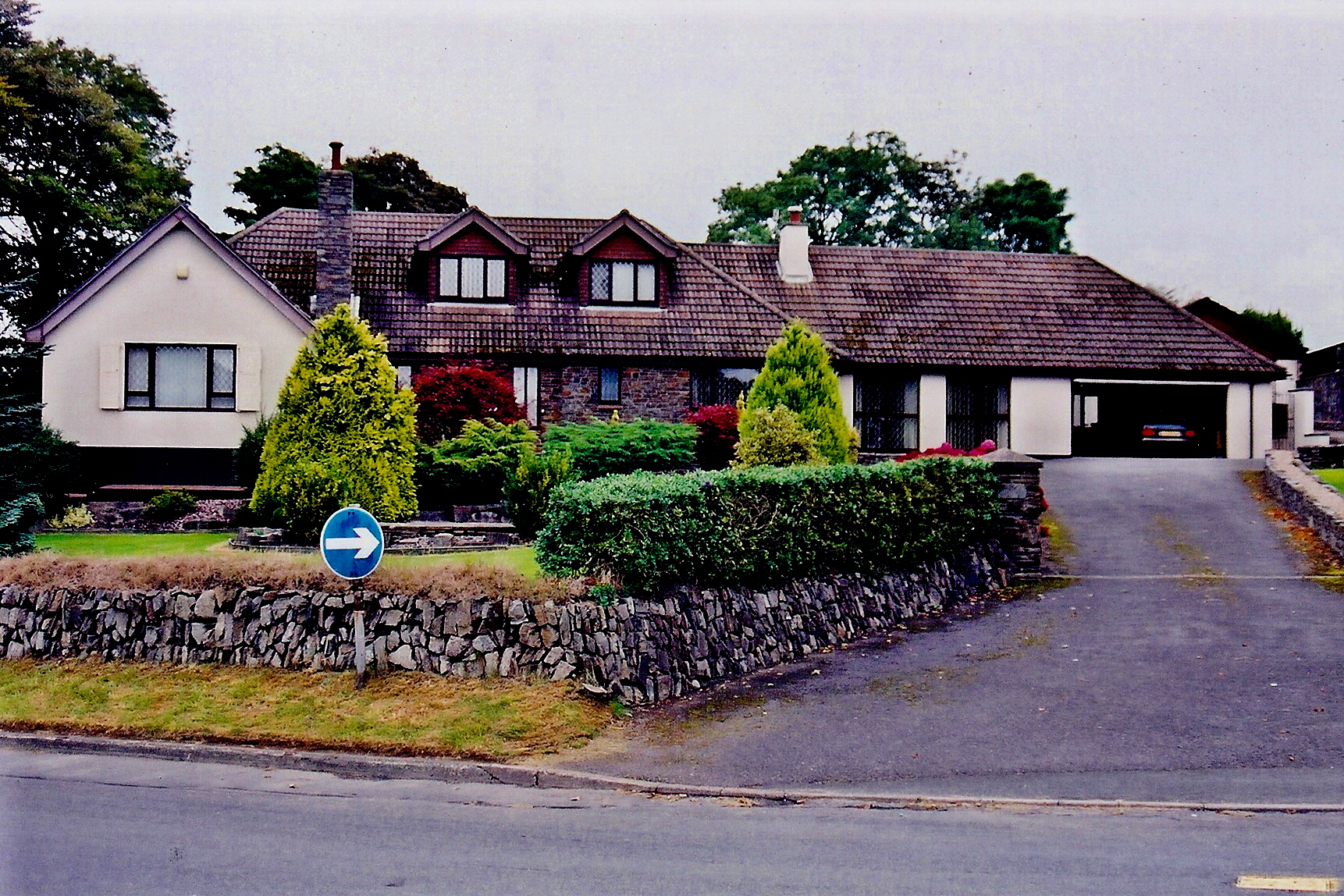
Private Dwelling In Onchan

The main shopping areas are The Village Walk, a small shopping arcade and Avondale Court, both off Avondale Road, Main Road and Port Jack. A house on the Whitebridge Road at one time had its own (private) miniature railway in its grounds. This was never a public railway. Onchan Community Centre is located off School Road with a community hall, sports hall, games room and committee room. There are a number of hotels and guest houses in the village and the Glen Dhoo and Lower Ballacottier campsites. DHSOB FC operate a campsite each year during the annual Isle of Man TT motorcycle racing. The area has a number of residential housing estates including a large collection of local authority housing at Nursery Avenue, an estate at Ballachrink which also houses more local authority dwellings, Lakeside Gardens to the north east side of the village, Birch Hill, which can be found above the core village area and a number of older residences in the centre, notably Royal Avenue, Port Jack and Alberta Drive all of which were developed in the earliest years of the twentieth century.

== Demographics ==
The Isle of Man census 2021 lists the population as 9,039, down from the 2016 figure of 9,128, which was a decrease from the population of 9,273 in 2011. It is the largest village on the island. It also has a higher population than all three of the island's towns - Castletown, Peel and Ramsey, making it the second largest settlement on the island (Douglas, a city since 2024, is the largest). Onchan is now principally a dormitory village, providing homes for workers in nearby Douglas.

== Education ==
There are two primary schools in Onchan, Onchan Primary School on School Road with nearly 400 pupils and Ashley Hill Primary School (Manx: Scoill Cronk Ashley) on Ashley Road which was opened in 1972 and has about 350 pupils. For secondary education children in Onchan usually go to either Ballakermeen High School in Douglas or St Ninian's High School which has a lower school (years 7–9) in Onchan and an upper school (years 10–11 and sixth form) in Upper Douglas.

== Notable people ==
- Vice-Admiral William Bligh FRS (1754–1817) was an officer of the British Royal Navy, and best known as "Captain Bligh" of Mutiny on the Bounty fame, married Elizabeth Betham, the daughter of a Customs Collector, on 4 February 1781 in Onchan.
- Sir John Charles Ready Colomb KCMG (1838 in Onchan – 1909 in London) was a British naval strategist. He was returned to parliament (1886–1892) as Conservative member for Bow and Bromley, and afterwards (1895–1906) for Great Yarmouth.
- Joseph Clayton Clarke (1857 in Onchan — 1937 in Hammersmith, London) who worked under the pseudonym "Kyd", was a British artist best known for his illustrations of characters from the novels of Charles Dickens.
- Harry Korris (1891-1971) - actor, comedian, star of Happidrome
- Colin Hardman (1947 in St Helens – 2006 at Oliver's Mount, Scarborough) renowned sidecar racer, who in partnership with Dave Molyneux was the winner of the 1989 Sidecar TT Race 'A'.
- Martin Rowe (born 1971) rally driver
- Peter Kennaugh (born 1989) Olympic Gold medal cyclist

== Sport ==
=== Football ===
Onchan is home to two football clubs, both of which compete in the Isle of Man Football League. Douglas High School Old Boys F.C. (DHSOB FC) are based at the DHSOB Football Ground, Blackberry Lane and are in the Premier League. Onchan F.C. are based at Nivison stadium, Onchan Pleasure Park and are in Division 2. The stadium was opened in 1952.

=== Stock cars ===
There is stock car racing held each week in the summer months in the Pleasure Park organised by the British Stock Car Association. There is also bowling, tennis and kart racing at the park as well as the Onchan Squash and Social Club.

=== Equestrian ===
The Abbeyland Equestrian Centre is on Scollag Road, but this has been knocked down and built over by houses.

=== Golf ===
King Edward Bay Golf Club is an 18-hole golf course located in an elevated position on the east side of the village off the A11 King Edward Road.

=== Pleasure Park ===
Onchan Pleasure Park is a leisure park which has a boating lake, miniature golf course, football pitch, tennis courts and a British Stock Car Association stock car racing track. Onchan Village Commissioners purchased farmland after World War II to build new homes and a recreation area with a large park containing a stadium with the first ever banked cycle track which was opened by Reg Harris, World Champion Sprint Cyclist and Britain's Sportsman of the Year, on 19 June 1951. The park cost £50,000 to build. The stadium is no longer used for cycling.

== Glens ==
=== Groudle Glen ===
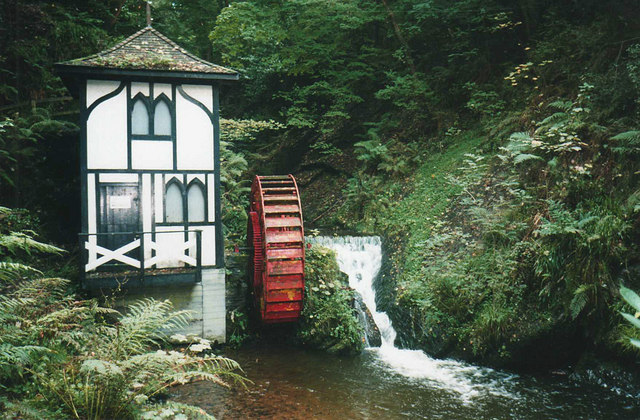
Little Isabella

Groudle Glen and Molly Quirk's Glen meet at the Whitebridge, at the northern edge of the village on the main A2 coast road to Laxey. Groudle Glen extends right down to the coast and has been described as one of the most spectacular of all the island's glens. It was developed in the 1890s as a pleasure glen, with trees planted and long winding paths added. A bandstand, swings and various other minor attractions were also added. On the rocky headland, a small inlet had been dammed off to form a deep pool, which became the centre of the small headland zoo which exhibited sea lions and polar bears. To get visitors out to the highland zoo, the glen owners built a miniature railway. Today, the attractions have all but disappeared apart from the Groudle Glen Railway, which still runs during the summer months operated by a group of local railway enthusiasts, who in the 1980s completely re-built the line after it was closed and ripped up in the early 1960s.

=== Molly Quirk's Glen ===
Molly Quirk's Glen was reputedly named after a woman who was murdered in her cottage. The glen covers about 5 acres (20,000 m^{2}). At the far end of the glen the Clypse and Kerrowdhoo reservoirs now have a series of footpaths and ancient tracks for walkers.

=== Bibaloe Glen ===
Bibaloe Glen was named after a ford at the bottom of Whitebridge Hill.

=== Raad Ny Foillan ===
The Raad ny Foillan (Way of the Gull) long distance coastal footpath opened in 1986, and runs along the coast in the village. It starts at Port Jack where it connects with Douglas, and runs as far as Howstrake Head before continuing into the neighbouring parish of Lonan.

== Onchan wetlands ==
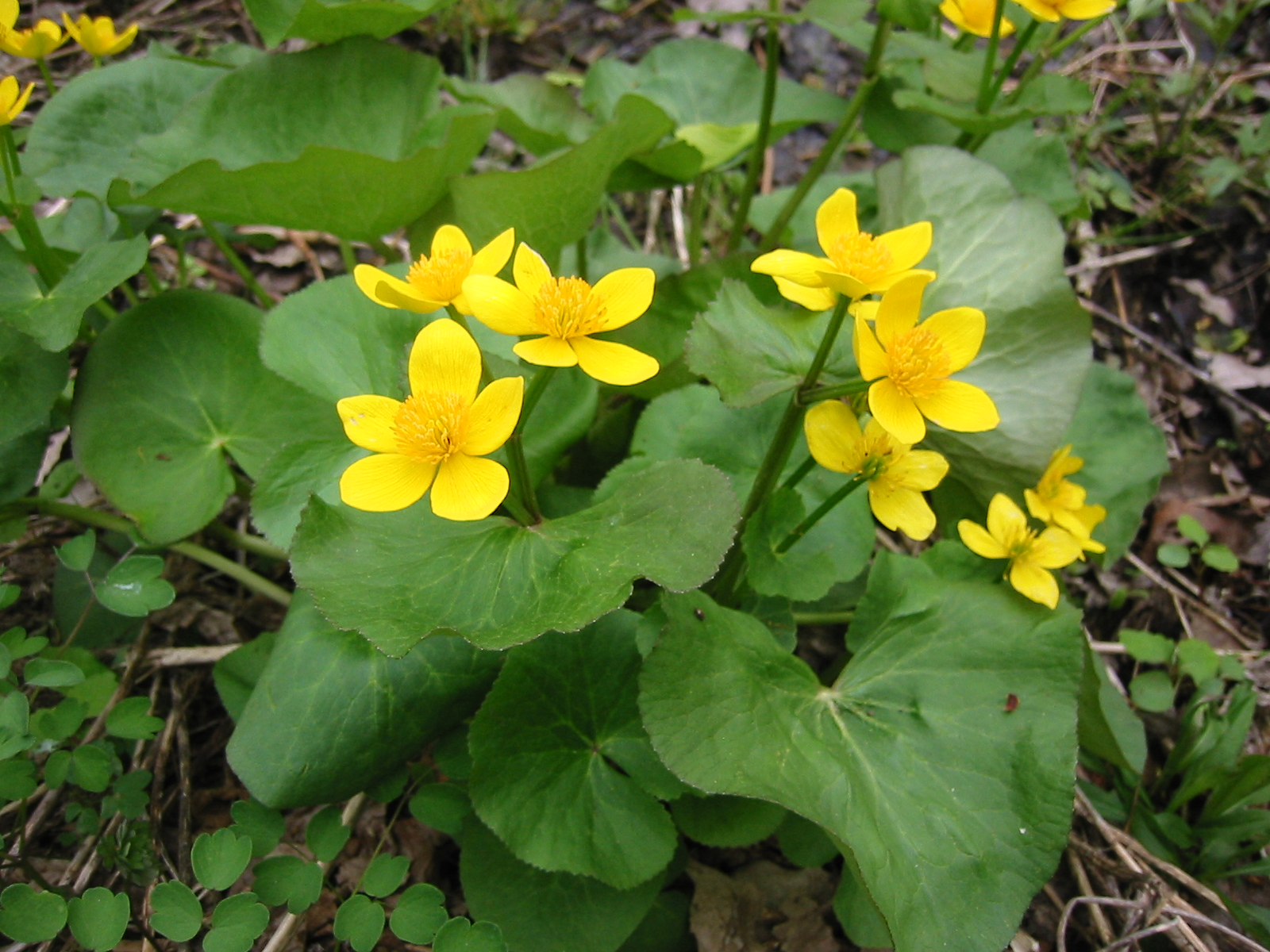
Marsh marigold

The Onchan wetlands (Manx: Curragh Kiondroghad) is a 1-acre (4,000 m^{2}) nature reserve in Onchan village that contains a variety of habitats. The site was donated to the Manx Wildlife Trust in 1988 and is open to the public for viewing and has a footpath which is suitable for wheelchair users. The site contains curragh (wetlands - willow scrub), broadleaved trees, dub (pond), neutral grassland and embankments of tall grassland. This variety of habitats leads to a diversity of wildlife and plant life. Some of the plants and trees that grow in the wetlands are silver birch, ash, holly, rowan, marsh marigold, yellow flag, reed canary grass, hemlock water-dropwort, woody nightshade and cuckoo flower. Birds recorded on the site are the grey wagtail, heron, mallard, goldcrest, woodcock, chiffchaff and hen harrier (rare) along with invertebrates and bats. There are also many frogs and spawn in early summer.

== Societies ==
Onchan Silver Band is a community-based fourth section brass band. It was founded in 1937.
