= Somewhere in Civvies =

1943 British film by Maclean Rogers

- Directed by: Maclean Rogers
- Written by: Con West; Frank Randle
- Produced by: T.A. Welsh
- Starring: Frank Randle
- Cinematography: Geoffrey Faithfull
- Edited by: Flora Newton; Ted Richards
- Music by: Percival Mackey
- Production company: Butcher's Film Service
- Distributed by: Butcher's Film Service (U.K.)
- Release date: 15 November 1943 (U.K.)
- Running time: 87 minutes
- Country: United Kingdom
- Language: English

Somewhere in Civvies is a 1943 British comedy film directed by Maclean Rogers and starring Frank Randle, George Doonan and Suzette Tarri. It was written by Con West and Randle.

Private Randle is discharged from the army and finds it difficult to adjust to civilian life. It was followed in 1948 by Somewhere in Politics.

== Preservation status ==
The British Film Institute National Archive holds a collection of ephemera but no film or video materials.

== Plot ==
Ex-army private Randle stands to receive a substantial inheritance from his uncle if he can prove he is of sound mind. However, his devious cousin tries to grab the money by having Randle committed to a psychiatric home.

== Cast ==
- Frank Randle as Private Randle
- George Doonan as Sergeant Doonan
- Suzette Tarri as Mrs Spam
- Joss Ambler as Matthews
- H.F. Maltby as Colonel Tyldesley
- Nancy O'Neil as Mary Randle
- Grey Blake as Ralph Tyldesley
- Gus Aubrey as Pilkington

== Reception ==
Kine Weekly wrote: "The crazy, boisterous comedy is padded out with a number of ambitious gags – the attempts to certify the hero sequences and the spooky house antics are quite funny – and crowned with an appropriate and entertaining concert party scene, but the laughter would, in all probability, have been louder or more frequent if it had been content with less pretentious footage. ... Its healthy vulgarity obviously has its virtues."

The Monthly Film Bulletin wrote: "Very rarely does an impossible story with still more impossible situations become an entertaining film, and in this case the result is what might be expected."
