= Lake Weir Yacht Club =

- U.S. National Register of Historic Places
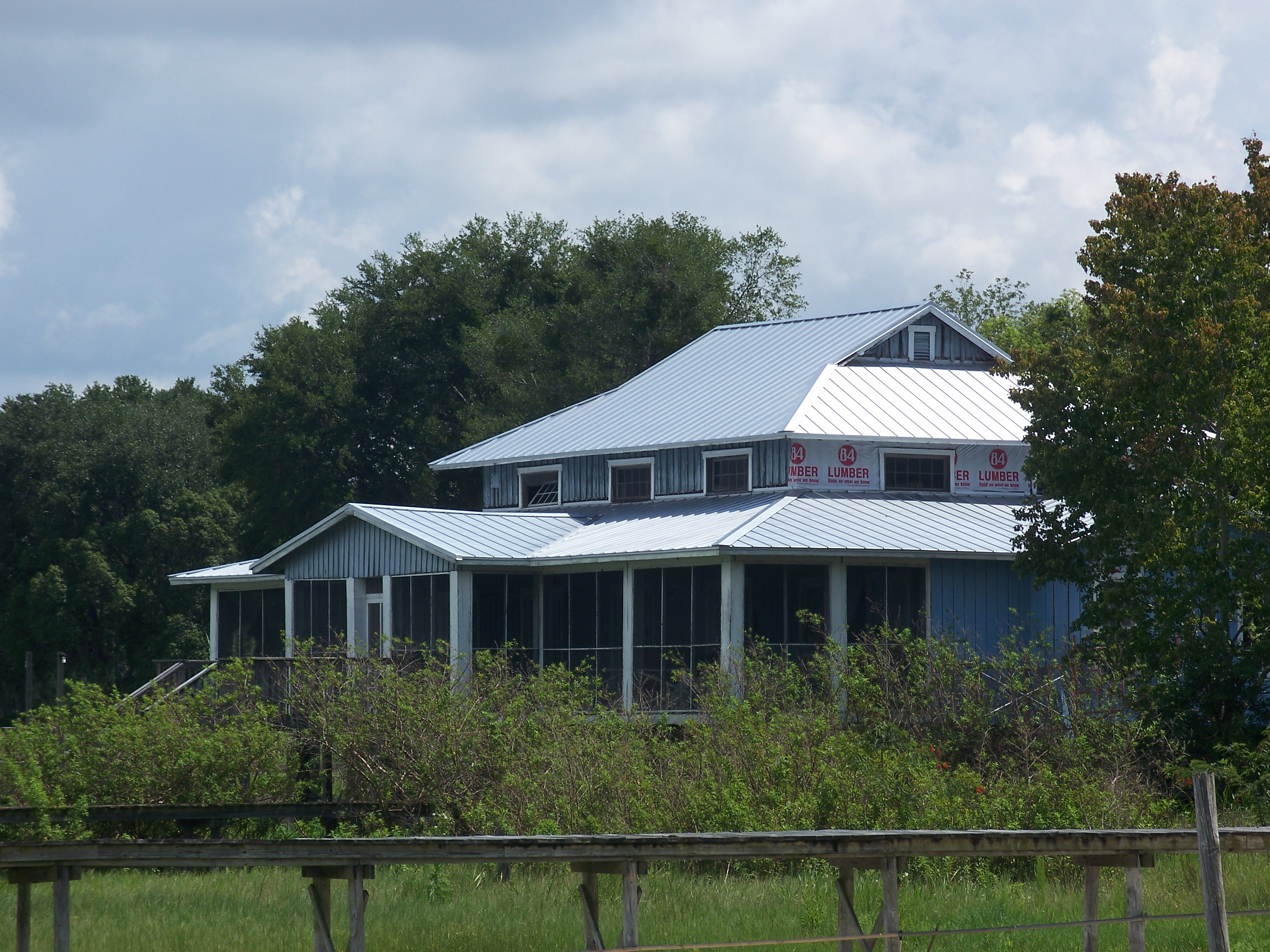

- Location within Florida Location within the United States
- Location: Eastlake Weir, Florida
- Coordinates: 29°1′15″N 81°54′50″W
- NRHP reference No.: 93000319
- Added to NRHP: April 22, 1993

The Lake Weir Yacht Club is a historic site in Eastlake Weir, Florida. It is located at New York Avenue. On April 22, 1993, it was added to the U.S. National Register of Historic Places.

== Gallery ==
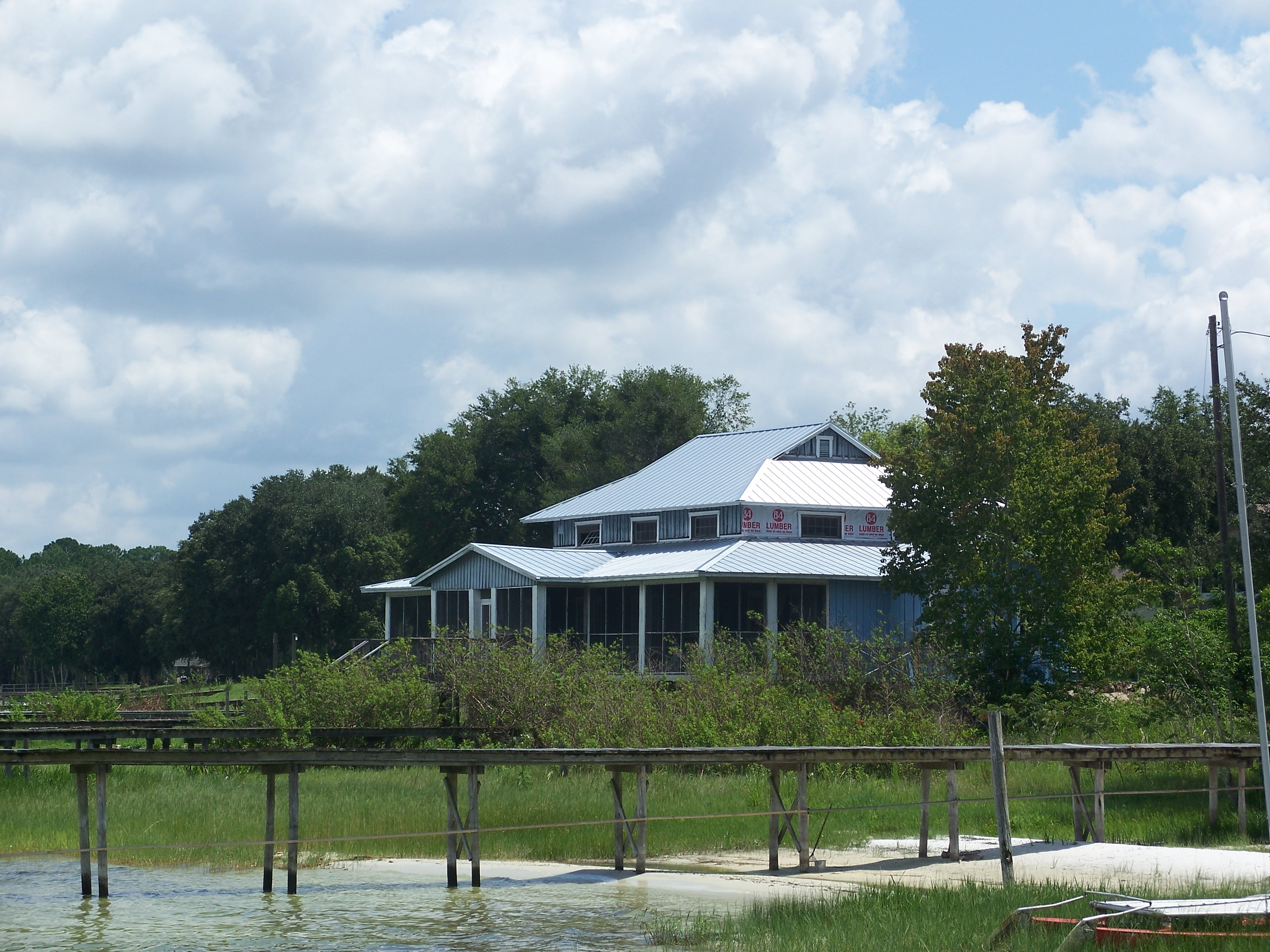

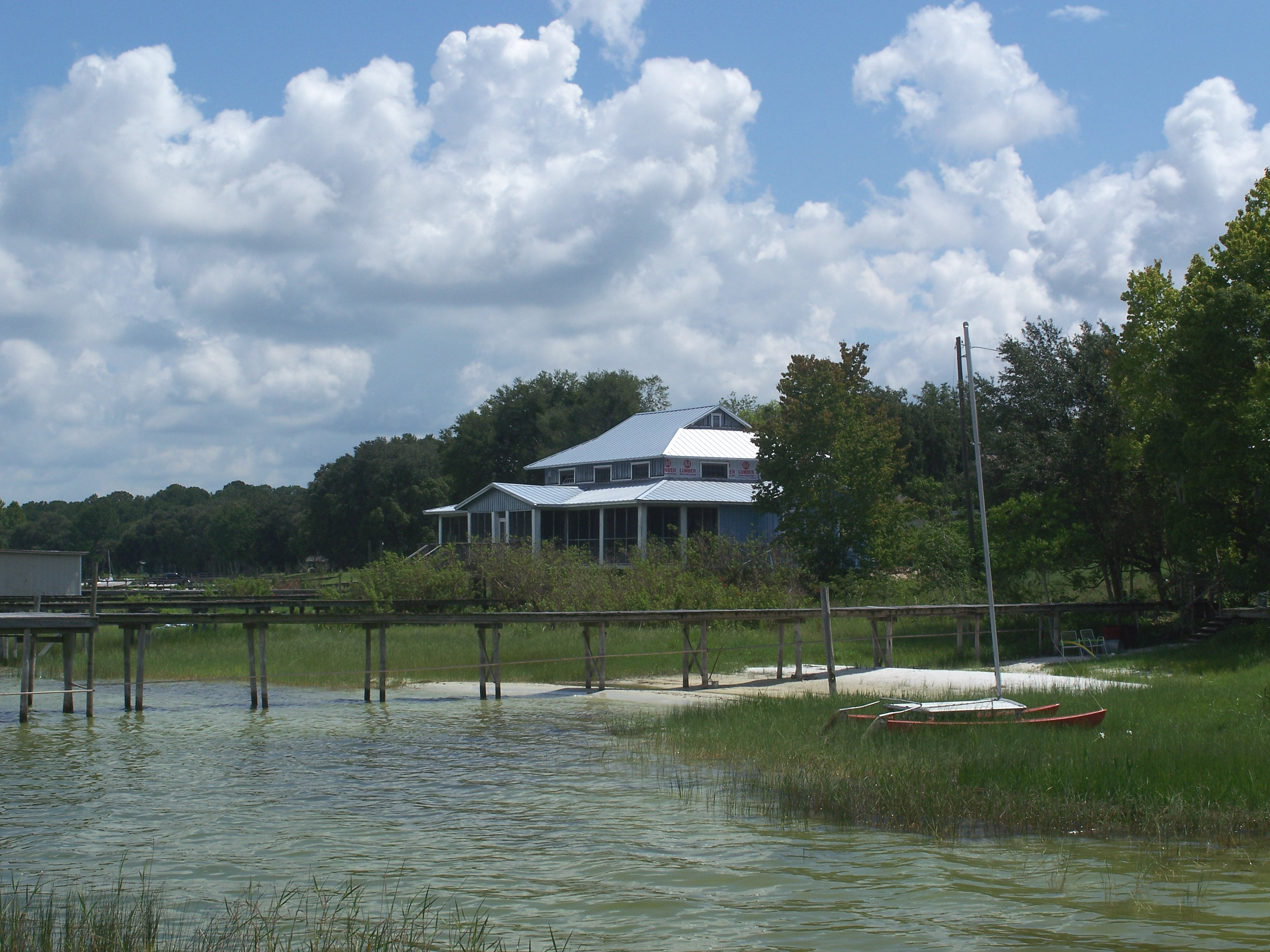
