= The Angelus (film) =

1937 British film by Thomas Bentley

- Contemporary trade advertisement from The Daily Film Renter (31 May 1937)
- Directed by: Thomas Bentley
- Written by: Michael Barringer
- Produced by: Julius Hagen
- Starring: Anthony Bushell; Nancy O'Neil; Eve Gray; Garry Marsh
- Cinematography: Sydney Blythe; William Luff
- Edited by: Robert Verrell
- Music by: W.L. Trytel
- Production company: Twickenham Studios
- Distributed by: Ambassador Film Productions
- Release date: 1937
- Running time: 76 minutes
- Country: United Kingdom
- Language: English

The Angelus (also known as Who Killed Fen Markham?) is a 1937 British crime film directed by Thomas Bentley and starring Anthony Bushell, Nancy O'Neil and Garry Marsh. It was written by Michael Barringer, and was made as a quota quickie.

== Synopsis ==
Young actress June Rowland is innocently involved in a scandal, resulting in her West End role being withdrawn. Her fiancé Brian remains loyal to her, but his father, businessman John Ware, is set against the marriage and June regretfully cancels the engagement. Maisie, an old friend of hers, learns that June's aunt, formerly a famous actress and now a nun, Sister Angelica, was once in love with Ware, and Masie pleads with her to intervene. She successfully does so, and Ware relents.

== Cast ==
- Anthony Bushell as Brian Ware
- Nancy O'Neil as June Rowland
- Eve Gray as Maisie Blake
- Mary Glynne as Sister Angelica
- Garry Marsh as Fen Markham
- Richard Cooper as Kenneth Blake
- Charles Carson as John Ware
- Amy Veness as Mrs. Grimes

== Reception ==
The Monthly Film Bulletin wrote: "It is an old-fashioned and unconvincing plot in which all the situations are manoeuvred. The convent scenes in particular are sentimentalised and unreal. Eve Gray is excellent as Maisie Blake, a friend of Sister Angelica's, but the acting is hampered by the story so that most of the actors fail to be convincing."

Kine Weekly wrote: "Here is an artless emotional potpourri, a sentimental romantic melodrama containing every element of traditional old-time theatre fare, from crime to the convent. The piecing together of the plot does not reveal a great deal of imagination, nor is the acting outstanding, but with all its unblushing naiveté, it has undoubted possibilities as a tear jerker for the masses."
