= Somewhere in Camp =

- VHS cover
- Directed by: John E. Blakeley
- Written by: Anthony Toner; Roney Parsons
- Produced by: John E. Blakeley
- Starring: Frank Randle; Harry Korris; Robbie Vincent
- Cinematography: Stephen Dade
- Edited by: Charles Knott
- Music by: Albert W. Stanbury; Percival Mackey and His Band (music performed by); Arthur Mertz (Lyrics Specially Written by)
- Production company: Mancunian Films
- Distributed by: Butcher's Film Service (U.K.)
- Release date: February 1942 (U.K.)
- Running time: 88 minutes
- Country: United Kingdom
- Language: English

Somewhere in Camp is a 1942 British comedy film directed by John E. Blakeley and starring Frank Randle, Harry Korris and Robbie Vincent. The film continues the adventures of Private Randle from the 1940 film Somewhere in England. It was followed in 1943 by Somewhere on Leave.

== Plot ==
Three army Privates (Frank Randle, Robbie Vincent and Dan Young) and their Sergeant (Harry Korris) devise a scheme to help Private Trevor (John Singer) woo the Commanding Officer's daughter (Jean Rivers). All efforts fail until Sergeant Korris drags up as a love-struck housekeeper.

== Cast ==
- Frank Randle as Pte. Randle
- Harry Korris as Sgt. Korris
- Robbie Vincent as Pte. Enoch
- Dan Young as Pte. Young
- John Singer as Pte. Jack Trevor
- Antoinette Lupino as Jean Rivers
- Peggy Novak as Mrs Rivers
- Clifford Buckton as Colonel Rivers
- Anthony Bazell as Captain Brown
- Gus Aubrey as Captain Lofty
- Ernest Dale as Private Dale
- Arthur Wilton as Private Wilton
- Billy Pardoe as Lt. Appleby
- Clifford Cobb as Dental M.O.
- Brian Herbert as Corporal Reed
- Arthur Denton as Charlie the Lodger
- Ronnie Kay as Randle, Jnr
- Keith Shepherd as Police Inspector
- Esme Lewis as Nurse to M.O.
- Vi Kaley as Maid in Sketch
- Nora Gordon as Matron
- Roma Rice as Girl Lodger
- Evie Carcroft as Mrs Korris
- Edna Wood as Lady at the Dance

== Critical reception ==
The Spinning Image wrote, "It would be easy to dismiss Randle's films as crude, basic and cheaply made. They are all these things, but they also preserve the work of a great character comedian and hero to thousands. They should be viewed for what they were, mass entertainment with no frills, and Randle's memory should be treasured as an outstanding example of the popular culture of his day". TV Guide described it as "A lively music-hall adventure...Eighty eight minutes of episodic silliness and tolerable musical numbers."

According to Kinematograph Weekly the film was "a nice long shot" at the British box office in April 1942.

== Bibliography ==
- Rattigan, Neil. This is England: British film and the People's War, 1939-1945. Associated University Presses, 2001.
