= John E. Blakeley =

English film director and producer (1888–1958)

John E. Blakeley (1 October 1888 – 20 February 1958) was a British film producer, director and screenwriter, the founder of Mancunian Films.

John E. Blakeley

Born in Ardwick, Manchester, son of James Blakeley (born c. 1862; Manchester), and Margaret Quirk (born c. 1861; Glasgow, Scotland), he was of Lancashire (Church of England) descent on his father's side of the family and Irish Catholic on his mother's. His father had become an early film distributor in 1908 after previous work as a travelling draper. Blakeley joined his father's business and soon came to understand the tastes of the emerging cinema audiences in the northern industrial towns. By the 1930s, the younger Blakeley was making films starring the idols of northern music hall comedy: George Formby, Frank Randle and Sandy Powell.

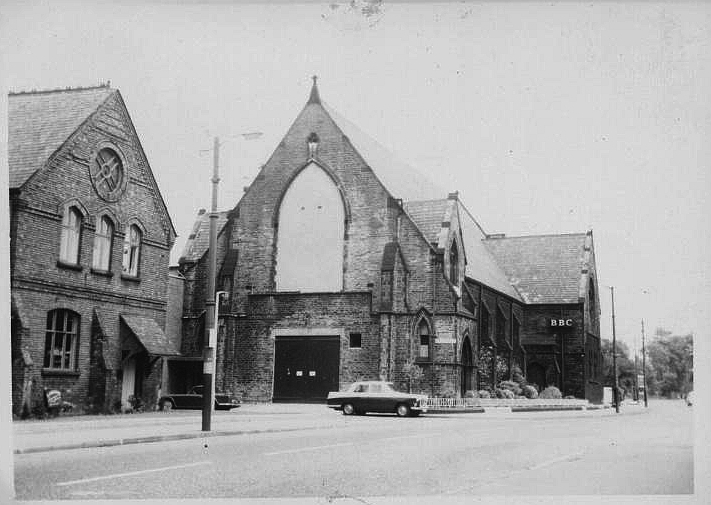
Dickenson Road Studios in Manchester during their BBC period, c. 1965

Initially relying on studios in London, rising costs encouraged him to found the Mancunian Film Studios in his hometown in 1947. With £70,000 capital, a former Methodist chapel on Dickenson Road in Rusholme was converted into a film studio. The studios produced a sequence of profitable films, often on shoestring budgets, until Blakeley's retirement in 1953. The following year the studios were sold to the BBC. Blakeley died in Stockport aged 69.

== Filmography ==
=== Director ===
- Dodging the Dole (1936)
- Somewhere in England (1940)
- Somewhere in Camp (1942)
- Somewhere on Leave (1942)
- Home Sweet Home (1945)
- Demobbed (1946)
- Under New Management (1946)
- Holidays with Pay (1948)
- Somewhere in Politics (1948)
- Cup-Tie Honeymoon (1948)
- What a Carry On! (1949)
- School for Randle (1949)
- Over the Garden Wall (1950)
- Let's Have a Murder (1950)
- It's a Grand Life (1953)

=== Producer ===
- The Television Follies (1933)
- The Penny Pool (1937)
- Calling All Crooks (1938)

== Bibliography ==
- Williams, Philip Martin & David L. (2001) New Edition (2006) Hooray for Jollywood - The Life of John E. Blakeley & The Mancunian Film Corporation
