= Belinda Sinclair =

British actress (born 1950)

- Born: 16 September 1950 (age 75); London

Belinda Sinclair (born 16 September 1950) is a retired British actress known for several recurring television roles. Her parents, Barry Sinclair and Nicolette Roeg were both actors, and her uncle Nicolas was a film director.

She was born in London, and was trained as an actress with the Arts Educational Schools, London and had early success on the stage. In the original stage run of The Rocky Horror Show, after the actress portraying Janet, Julie Covington, was badly injured in an accident, she had to leave the production. Sinclair took over the role, and is featured on the original cast recording. In 1980, she appeared in the Granada Television series Lady Killers. She also appeared in Hair.

Sinclair has had several on-going television roles. Among these are Shelley (1979–84), in which she appeared alongside Hywel Bennett, and later the part of Fern Farmer in five's soap opera Family Affairs. She played the role of Fern Farmer from 1999 to autumn 2003 when her character was killed in a car accident.
