= Happidrome (film) =

1943 British film by Philip Brandon

- Opening titles
- Directed by: Phil Brandon
- Screenplay by: James Seymour; Tom Arnold
- Based on: Happidrome (radio)
- Produced by: Harold Boxall; Jack Buchanan
- Starring: Harry Korris; Robbie Vincent; Cecil Fredericks
- Cinematography: Geoffrey Faithfull
- Edited by: Alan Jaggs
- Music by: Bretton Byrd
- Production company: Aldwych Films
- Distributed by: MGM
- Release date: 7 June 1943
- Running time: 87 minutes
- Country: United Kingdom
- Language: English

Happidrome is a 1943 British comedy film directed by Philip Brandon and starring Harry Korris, Robbie Vincent and Cecil Fredericks. It was a spin-off from the Happidrome BBC radio series which was popular at the time. The film was made at the Riverside Studios in Hammersmith, and produced by the musical star Jack Buchanan. The sets were designed by the art director William Hemsley.

== Synopsis ==
Mr Lovejoy, a struggling actor-manager returns to a small provincial town with plans to put on a show. Despite having debts there during the previous visit, he is cunningly able to keep his show on the road and gains free advertising in a newspaper by announcing that local talent will be cast. In the meantime he acquires two incompetent assistants, Enoch and Ramsbottom, and Bunty Meadows, an eager would-be star also wangles her way into the company. A statuesque but domineering Russian prima donna also joins the cast.

Bunty's determination to become a leading lady has a disastrous effect on the opening night which is supposed to be a serious play about Ancient Rome, but quickly descends into a total farce. With the audience extremely amused, the show is quickly rebilled as a comedy.

== Cast ==
- Harry Korris as Mr Lovejoy
- Robbie Vincent as Enoch
- Cecil Fredericks as Ramsbottom
- Bunty Meadows as Bunty Mossup
- Lisa Lee as Tanya / Josephine
- Jennie Gregson as Mrs Bane
- Muriel Zillah as Muriel
- Connie Creighton as Connie
- Marie Lawson as Marie
- Olga Stevenson as Miss D'Orsay
- Joss Ambler as Mr Mossup
- Valentine Dunn as Mrs Mossup
- Bryan Herbert as Newspaper editor
- Arthur Hambling as Jones Jnr.
- Leslie 'Hutch' Hutchinson as himself
- Cairoli Brothers as Themselves
- Billy Wells as Ivan

== Bibliography ==
- Richards, Jeffrey. Films and British National Identity: from Dickens to Dad's Army. Manchester University Press, 1997.
