= Something Always Happens (1934 film) =

- John Singer and Ian Hunter
- Directed by: Michael Powell
- Written by: Brock Williams
- Produced by: Irving Asher
- Starring: Ian Hunter; Nancy O'Neil
- Cinematography: Basil Emmott
- Edited by: Bert Bates; Ralph Dawson
- Distributed by: Warner Bros.
- Release date: 10 December 1934
- Running time: 69 minutes
- Country: United Kingdom
- Language: English

Something Always Happens is a 1934 British romantic comedy film directed by Michael Powell and starring Ian Hunter and Nancy O'Neil. It was written by Brock Williams and was made as a Quota quickie.

== Plot ==
Peter Middleton is an unemployed car salesman. He rescues hungry street urchin Billy, who has been caught stealing from a street vendor, and takes him under his wing. Peter rents a room. He has no money, but Mrs. Badger, the landlady, is too kindhearted to turn the pair away.

When an acquaintance mentions that he has a client who wants to purchase a 1934 Bentley, Peter sees an opportunity to make a commission and scours the streets. He finds one and brazenly inspects it, much to the puzzlement of the chauffeur. In the process, Peter accidentally backs into Cynthia Hatch. When he pretends the car is his, she gets him to take her to a fine restaurant. She lets him believe she is also out of work, but in reality, she is the Bentley's owner. She is well known to the restaurant staff, but she asks the maitre d' to pretend to not know her to play a trick on Peter. Peter eventually confesses he has no money. She talks him into trying to see Mr. Hatch, the wealthy head of several petrol-related companies (and her father).

Peter spends all night devising a plan to make petrol stations more attractive to customers by offering additional services, such as dining, dancing and even swimming pools. Meanwhile, Cynthia asks her father to see Peter. The following day, Peter gets to meet Hatch, but Hatch turns him down without even giving Peter a chance to explain his plan. Hatch jokingly suggests he go see Blue Point, a rival which is being beaten down by his company. Peter does so, and is hired as their manager.

Peter makes Blue Point a great success, much to the chagrin of Hatch, who had been hoping to buy the struggling company. Peter hires Cynthia as his secretary, still unaware of her true identity. Within a year, Blue Point has overtaken and soared past Hatch's company. When Peter learns that a bypass is going to be built, he plans to buy sites for petrol stations along the route before Hatch hears about it. However, George Hamlin, Blue Point's publicist, has done such a poor job that Peter threatens to sack him; George betrays the plan to Hatch, who outbids Peter's company for all the sites. After Peter receives the bad news, he sees Cynthia taking money from Hatch and concludes that she betrayed him. When he confronts her, she denies it and storms out, but not before revealing that Hatch is her father. Afterward, Peter learns that the bypass will not be built for another fifteen years. Hatch offers to sell some of his holdings to Peter, those he believes the bypass will make worthless. Knowing otherwise, Peter accepts. After the sale, Hatch learns of the delay and realises he has been outwitted. However, he is not too displeased, having come to respect Peter. When Peter runs into George outside Hatch's office, he realises who the real traitor is. Peter then reconciles with Cynthia, much to her father's secret delight.

== Cast ==
- Ian Hunter as Peter Middleton
- Nancy O'Neil as Cynthia Hatch
- Peter Gawthorne as Ben Hatch
- John Singer as Billy
- Muriel George as Mrs. Badger
- Barry Livesey as George Hamlin

== Production ==
Scott Salwolke states that Michael Powell's films of this period "were modelled after the screwball comedies coming out of the United States... British directors often worked on films that appropriated their material from the more successful imports".

Powell himself names the film as one of "The quota-quickies that I made during the last months of my purgatory for the American Irving Asher... Irving had the run of the Warner Brothers' library in Hollywood. He had to make about twenty films a year to fulfil his British quota and keep his Warner Brothers' Teddington Studios running. He went back to California each year with the head of his scenario department, raided the story department at Burbank and came back to Teddington with perhaps fifty scripts that had already been turned into films... All that Irving had to do was hand the script to his story department, who cut it down to fifty pages and handed it over to a director like me. This was how tight little dramas like my Crown v Stevens, or comedies like Something Always Happens... arrived on the British screen. I made six or seven of these for Irving..."

== Reception ==
The Daily Film Renter wrote: "There is nothing very striking about the plot of this effort, but it makes pleasant, light entertainment. ... . Jan Hunter plays Beter in an engaging manner, being capitally supported by Muriel George in a gem role as a golden-hearted landlady. Nancy O'Neill is a conventional Cynthia, her 'ultra-refained' accent becoming irritating after a time. Millicent Wolf shines in a brief supporting part. John Singer deserves a word of praise for his amusing waif study."

Picturegoer wrote: "Michael Powell's direction is and imaginative, and the comedy situations are handled with a slickness and polish that make this unpretentious picture a very enjoyable one."
