= Port Jack Halt =

Manx train station

Port Jack Purt Coon
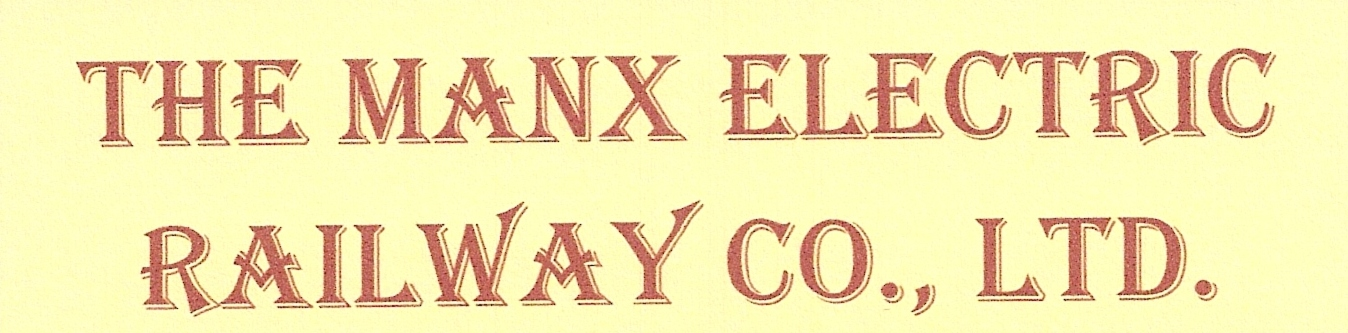

General information
- Location: Onchan, Isle Of Man
- Coordinates: 54.16712°N 4.452381°W
- Pole No.: 016-017
- System: Manx Electric Railway
- Owner: Isle Of Man Railways
- Platforms: Ground Level
- Tracks: 2 (Running & Crossover)

Construction
- Structure type: None
- Parking: None

History
- Opened: 1893
- Former names: Manx Electric Railway Co.
Location

Port Jack Halt (Manx: Stadd Phurt Coon) is the name of the first official stopping place on the Manx Electric Railway on the Isle of Man and is situated a short distance from the terminus.

== Environs ==
Today, the site is known for being the location of the chip shop of the same name, but in the busy tourist days of the island it was a popular stopping off point for visitors on their way to the White City located a few yards along the coast. It remains open today but is only demarcated by a small bus stop-type sign fitted to one of the green overhead poles. The site is also served by the island's Bus Vannin service. Whilst never appearing in the railway's timetables or scheduling, the halt has long been established as a dropping-off point for local traffic and tramcars stop on either side of the road that bisects the railway at this point, either on the southerly side outside the chip shop, or the northerly which directly leads to a set of public conveniences.

== Douglas Bay Hotel ==
The station was once the closest to the Douglas Bay Hotel which dominated the skyline until gutted by a devastating fire in 1988. The hotel was the focal point of the headland and built from red brick with a tower at its centre; it was famous for the Texas Bar, a Wild West-themed saloon that was open to both residents and non-residents. In latter years, a small swimming pool was built in the grounds nearby to the passing tramlines.

== Skandia House ==
Skandia House opened on the site on 31 January 2003 following development by Dandara. The redevelopment of the site included digging down into the rock to facilitate the space for an underground carpark. The primary tenant of the four floor building from opening has been Royal Skandia Life Assurance, a company who had a presence on the island in various guises for the previous 20 years. In 2005, Royal Skandia sub-let a small unoccupied floor of the office to Poker Stars who were moving their business from the warm Caribbean to the middle of the cold Irish Sea for tax and reputational reasons. In 2012 Poker Stars purchased the building to help reassure their permanent residency on the island to external parties. By this stage PokerStars has purchased the Guernsey-based Full Tilt Poker to consolidate themselves as the largest online poker company in the world. The PR for this circled around the Isle of Man Chief Minister Allan Bell toasting sparkling wine in the reception of Skandia House. Skandia International (renamed since the Skandia business was in 2006 by the FTSE100 company Old Mutual) remain the primary tenant of the building for the foreseeable future employing over 300 people in two thirds of the building space. PokerStars employ around 200 people in the remaining space (including reclaimed and converted carpark spaces) within Skandia House.

A large stone sign at the entry of the building confirms the name of the building as Skandia House however Poker Stars have always referred to the building as the grand "Douglas Bay Complex".

A circular tower was incorporated into the design of horse shoe shape building, both slightly echoing the hotel structure it replaced. The staff restroom in Skandia House was called the "Texas Bar" to also recall the previous occupancy of the site. A smart redevelopment of the restroom in 2012 by PokerStars led to the name unimaginatively being changed to "The Ocean".

== Facilities ==
The area was once a bustling place for tourists to visit and featured a penny amusement arcade with slot machines and the like, a milk bar known as the "Moo Kow" and other shops that traded in souvenirs and the like. Being above a stony beach of the same name, previously known as "Port-E-Vada Creek" the shops traded largely in seaside equipment as one would expect. The distinctive Mock Tudor-style buildings remain today, now location for a tanning shop, tapas bar and the famous "Port Jack Chippie" chip shop; in the terrace behind is a convenience store and hairdressers' salon. It was once a busy area for tourists, with many of the buildings that now form private dwellings or apartments being bed-and-breakfasts or guest houses.

== Route ==
| Preceding station | Manx Electric Railway | Following station |
|---|---|---|
| Derby Castle Terminus | Douglas–Ramsey | Onchan Head towards Ramsey Station |

== Also ==
Manx Electric Railway Stations

== Sources ==
- Manx Electric Railway Stopping Places (2002) Manx Electric Railway Society
- Island Images: Manx Electric Railway Pages (2003) Jon Wornham
- Official Tourist Department Page (2009) Isle Of Man Heritage Railways
