= East Lake Weir, Florida =

Unincorporated community in Florida, U.S.

East Lake Weir
- Unincorporated community
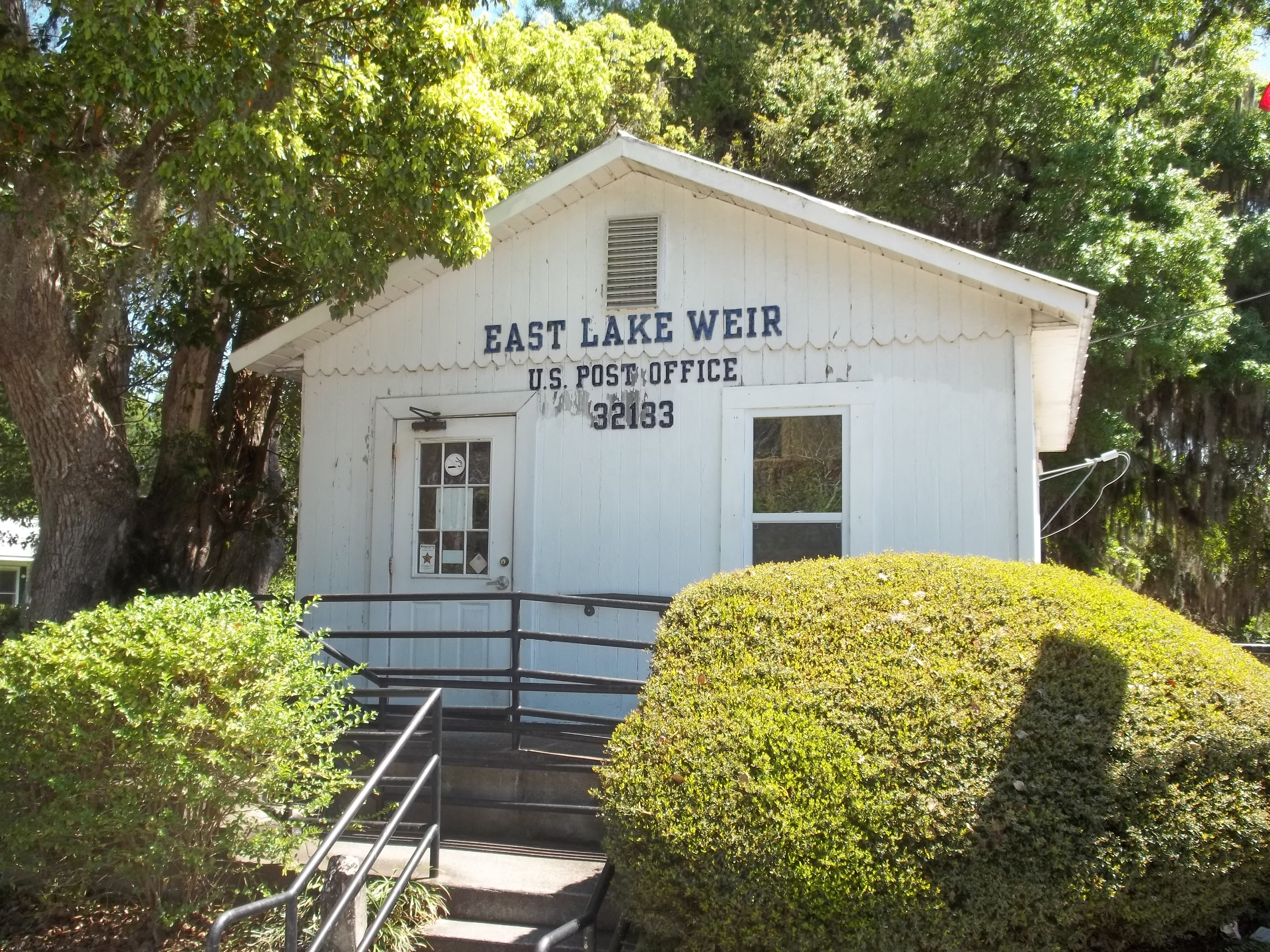
- Post office

- Location in Florida
- Coordinates: 29°01′12″N 81°54′30″W
- Country: United States
- State: Florida
- County: Marion County

Government
  - Type: Unincorporated
- Time zone: UTC-5 (Eastern Time)
  - Summer (DST): UTC-4 (EDT)
- ZIP Code: 32133
- Part of the Ocala Metropolitan Statistical Area

East Lake Weir is an unincorporated community in eastern Marion County, Florida, United States, on the east shore of Lake Weir. The community is part of the Ocala Metropolitan Statistical Area. The ZIP Code for East Lake Weir is 32133.

East Lake Weir is the headquarters of the historic Lake Weir Yacht Club, which has been on the National Register of Historic Places since 1993.
