= Somewhere in England (film) =

- Directed by: John E. Blakeley
- Written by: Anthony Toner Roney Parsons
- Produced by: John E. Blakeley
- Starring: Frank Randle; Harry Korris; Robbie Vincent
- Cinematography: Geoffrey Faithfull
- Edited by: E.R. Richards
- Music by: Albert W. Stanbury; Percival Mackey (musical director)
- Production company: Mancunian Films
- Distributed by: Butcher's Film Service (U.K.)
- Release date: August 1940 (U.K.)
- Running time: 79 minutes
- Country: United Kingdom
- Language: English

Somewhere in England is a 1940 British comedy film directed by John E. Blakeley and starring Frank Randle, Harry Korris and Winki Turner. It follows the adventures of an anti-authoritarian private stationed in a military camp in the North of England during the Second World War. It was the first in the Somewhere film series, followed by its sequel Somewhere in Camp in 1942.

== Plot ==
In a North of England training camp, lovestruck Corporal Kenyon (Harry Kemble) is framed and demoted in rank by a rival in love for the affections of the Adjutant's daughter. Four friends rally round to help clear the Corporal's name.

== Cast ==
- Frank Randle - Pte. Randle
- Harry Korris - Sgt. Korris
- Winki Turner - Irene Morant
- Dan Young - Pte. Young
- Robbie Vincent - Pte. Enoch
- Harry Kemble - Cpl. Jack Kenyon
- John Singer - Bert Smith
- Sydney Moncton - Adjutant
- Stanley King
- The 8 Master Singers
- Percival Mackey & His Orchestra - Themselves

== Bibliography ==
- Rattigan, Neil. This is England: British film and the People's War, 1939-1945. Associated University Presses, 2001.
