= The Happidrome (radio) =

The Happidrome is a BBC radio comedy programme produced in Britain between 1941 and 1947. It was produced by Ernest Longstaffe and starred Harry Korris as Mr Lovejoy, the harassed manager of a small provincial theatre. Other regular cast members were Cecil Frederick as Ramsbottom, the stage manager, and Robbie Vincent as Enoch, the call boy. The show also featured leading performers of the time as guest stars.

The programme was intended as a showcase for leading variety acts, and, because of the wartime evacuation of the BBC's Variety Department, was broadcast live each week from the Grand Theatre, Llandudno in north Wales, with an audience of war workers and service personnel. Longstaffe had seen Korris, Frederick, and Vincent performing together in a summer show, Arcadian Follies, in Blackpool, and built the show around them.

It was broadcast to troops around the world, and, to the BBC's surprise, the trio themselves became stars. The show started on 9 February 1941 and was originally scheduled to run for six weeks, but proved popular and ran for three lengthy series (1941–42, 1943–44, and 1946–47), with a final episode on Boxing Day 1947. Their catchphrases, such as "Let me tell you..." and "Take him away, Ramsbottom", became popular, as did the closing song, starting: "We three in Happidrome, working for the BBC / Ramsbottom and Enoch and me..".

Many of the top British stars of the day appeared on the show, including Sandy Powell, Charles Penrose, Jack Warner, Beryl Reid, and Vic Oliver, together with earlier music hall stars including Harry Champion, George Robey, Hetty King, and G. H. Elliott. The final episode in 1947 featured Josef Locke and Suzette Tarri.

In 1942, the show was presented at the Prince of Wales Theatre in London, with Leslie Hutchinson ("Hutch") guesting. There was also a spin-off film, Happidrome, in 1943.
