= Somewhere in Politics =

1948 British film by John E. Blakeley

- Directed by: John E. Blakeley
- Written by: Harry Jackson
- Produced by: John E. Blakeley
- Starring: Frank Randle; Tessie O'Shea; Josef Locke
- Cinematography: Ernest Palmer; Ben R. Hart
- Edited by: Dorothy Stimson
- Music by: Fred Harries
- Production company: Mancunian Films
- Distributed by: Mancunian Films (U.K.)
- Release date: 19 November 1948 (London)
- Running time: 108 minutes
- Country: United Kingdom
- Language: English

Somewhere in Politics (also known as A Full House) is a lost 1948 British comedy film directed and produced by John E. Blakeley and starring Frank Randle, Tessie O'Shea and Josef Locke. It was written by Harry Jackson.

It was the fifth in the Somewhere series of films featuring Randle.

== Preservation status ==
The British Film Institute has classed Somewhere in Politics as a lost film. Its National Archive holds a collection of ephemera and stills but no film or video materials. An 18-minute segment of the film is known to exist (held by the North West Film Archive), which was released in June 1960 as the short film Full House.

== Plot ==
Joe Smart is a radio repairman who enters the political arena competing in an upcoming election against his own boss. Joe wins the election, but encounters various troubles in the process.

== Cast ==
- Frank Randle as Joe Smart
- Tessie O'Shea as Daisy Smart
- Josef Locke as Cllr. Willoughby
- Sally Barnes as Marjorie Willoughby
- Syd Harrison as Tony Parker
- Max Harrison as Arthur Parker
- Bunty Meadows as Martha Parker
- Jimmy Clitheroe as Sonny
- Sonny Burke as Reggie Smart
- Anthony Oakley as Howard
- Bernard Graham as bank manager
- Effi McIntosh as Mrs. Jones
- Kay Compston as Lady Hazelmere
- Fred Simister as Detective Sergeant
- George Little as mayor

== Critical reception ==
The Monthly Film Bulletin wrote: "The provinces will probably enjoy this knockabout comedy, though many Londoners will fail to see the point. The pace is rapid and much helped by the efforts of the cast."

Kine Weekly wrote: "Crazy north country comedy extravaganza, pivoting on a municipal election. Frank Randle, well-known character comedian, and Tessie O'Shea, generously upholstered favourite of music-hall and radio, are the co-stars and their exuberant improvisations take up some of the slack in a slap-dash and interminable script. ... What humour there is mostly springs from the stars' own spontaneous cracks."

The Daily Film Renter wrote: "This popular compound of farce, slapstick, Irish ballads and comic songs is adroitly designed to amuse the industrial audiences, and as such will doubtless prove to be another rewarding proposition from a studio which knows what its public likes. ... Extra fun and frolic comes from Syd and Max Harrison, Josef Locke contributes several well-known songs, worked into an eve-of-poll concert. Sonny Burke and Sally Barnes have romantic roles as the unpolitical son and daughter of the political opponents."

To-Day's Cinema concluded: "In addition to the untiring inventiveness of the star in grimace and tumble, the escapades are served by the clowning of Tessie as Randle's electioneering wife as she also heaves her 'two-ton' around in abandoned dance as by the singing of sentimental ditty by Josef Locke, and by the lunacies of Syd and Max in song and sally. It is all put over with pace and vigour, and will doubtless register heartily with the legion of Randle fans."
