= Somewhere on Leave =

1943 British film by John E. Blakeley

- Theatrical release poster
- Directed by: John E. Blakeley
- Written by: Roney Parsons; Anthony Toner
- Produced by: John E. Blakeley
- Starring: Frank Randle
- Cinematography: Geoffrey Faithfull
- Edited by: E.R. Richards
- Music by: Percival Mackey
- Production company: Mancunian Films
- Distributed by: Butcher's Film Service (U.K.)
- Release date: February 1943 (U.K.)
- Running time: 96 minutes
- Country: United Kingdom
- Language: English

Somewhere on Leave is a 1943 British comedy film directed by John E. Blakeley and starring Frank Randle, Harry Korris and Dan Young. It was written by Roney Parsons and Anthony Toner and was the third in a series of five Somewhere films following Private Randle and his comrades.

== Plot ==
Private Randle and army pals Privates Young and Enoch are invited by Private Desmond to spend some off-duty time at his stately home. Desmond is too busy courting an ATS girl to notice that the squaddies are running riot in his house.

== Cast ==
- Frank Randle as Private Randle
- Harry Korris as Sergeant Korris
- Dan Young as Private Young
- Robbie Vincent as Private Enoch
- Antoinette Lupino as Toni Beaumont
- Pat McGrath as Private Roy Desmond
- Toni Edgar-Bruce as Mrs. Delvaine
- Edna Wood as Land Girl
- Vincent Holman as butler
- Percival Mackey Orchestra as themselves
- Noel Dainton as Capt. Delvaine
- Sidney Monckton as Captain Adams
- John Varley as Lieut. Bassett
- Clifford Cobb as Commando Sergeant
- Elizabeth Wilson as ATS girl
- Esme Lewis as Mrs Gerrard
- Nan Hopkins as ATS girl
- Hilda Jones as Land Girl
- Ernie Dillon as trampoline artist

== Critical reception ==
The Monthly Film Bulletin wrote: "Though the jokes are not always in the best of taste, and the quartette have not yet developed a film technique, but merely put on a number of variety turns, lovers of the rougher brand of humour will get their full share of laughs. The romance, on the other hand, is a little too ludicrous, all the more so as Pat McGrath and Toni Lupino suffer badly from lack of direction."

Kine Weekly wrote in 1946: "Hearty British musical extravaganza featuring Frank Randle and many of the famous stars of 'Happidrome', one of war-time radio's most popular comedy features. Originally reviewed in the Kine of November 5, 1942, it returns to the screen untouched by scissors, but, in spite of its formidable footage, its fruity, not to say ribald, humour continues to register. Its tireless co-stars are past masters at cracking chestnuts."

The Radio Times gave the film two out of five stars, writing: "Of the music-hall turns who made films, Lancashire comedian Frank Randle was among the most successful. But his appeal inevitably exemplifies the North-South divide and his success – including that of his five Somewhere films – was largely confined to home ground ... It may be unsophisticated, and more a series of incidents than a cohesive narrative, but it's still fun."

In British Sound Films: The Studio Years 1928–1959 David Quinlan rated the film as "mediocre", writing: "Old hat high jinks."
