= Frank Randle =

English comedian (1901–1957)

- Born: Arthur Hughes; 30 January 1901; Aspull, England
- Died: 7 July 1957 (aged 56); Blackpool, England
- Occupation: Comedian/Comic actor
- Spouse: May Annie Victoria Douglas

Frank Randle (born Arthur Hughes, also known as Arthur McEvoy or Arthur Twist; 30 January 1901 – 7 July 1957) was an English comedian. A contemporary of fellow Lancastrians George Formby and Gracie Fields, he was regarded as more subversive, perhaps explaining why the immense popularity he enjoyed during his lifetime has not survived him.

== Life and career ==
Randle was born in Aspull, near Wigan, Lancashire, to unmarried domestic servant Rhoda Heathcote Hughes (1879-1965); his father was unrecorded. He left school aged 13 and worked in menial jobs until two years later when he joined an acrobatic troupe. He took the name Arthur McEvoy after his mother married mechanic Richard McEvoy in 1913. In 1928, Randle began to tour as a comedian, principally in Lancashire and Northern England. Randle appeared on stage carrying a red warning lamp, similar to the type found around road works, declaring "Look what some dam'd fool left in’t road". He developed his own show, Randle's Scandals, which in the 1950s featured Roy Castle.

Randle's mischievous wit led to a running conflict with Harry Barnes, a police chief constable of the Lancashire seaside resort of Blackpool, who frequently banned him from performing in the town's venues. He was prosecuted in 1952 on four charges of obscenity and fined £10 on each count. Randle responded to his critics in robust fashion, frequently throwing his false teeth into the audience and once bombarding Blackpool from an aeroplane with toilet rolls (according to an episode of Rude Britannia, broadcast by the BBC on 15 June 2010, the toilet roll bombardment actually took place over Accrington, not Blackpool). Randle's police charge sheet is lodged with Lancashire Archives.

On the outbreak of the Second World War, having failed his medical to join the RAF, Randle joined the Home Guard and established a career in film. His iconoclastic portrayal of the underdog, flouting authority and disrupting the establishment, found a ready audience in a population suffering the privations of war. He took equity in John E. Blakeley's Manchester-based Mancunian Film Studios, appearing in eight of its productions. In his last film, It's a Grand Life (1953), his co-star was Diana Dors.

Frank Randle's grave

Although he was reportedly taking £1,000 a week [at the box office] at Hulme Hippodrome in 1950, with the decline of Variety in the 1950s Randle's career declined. Pressed by debts and tax arrears, and suffering from the consequences of a life of alcohol abuse, he reportedly owed the Inland Revenue £56,000 in 1954 was made bankrupt by the tax authorities in 1955.

He married May Annie Victoria Douglas, known as Queenie, in 1928 in Greenwich, London. There were no children but Manchester artist Arthur Delaney was alleged to be Randle's illegitimate son by fellow performer Genevieve Delaney (also known as Eve Delaney). This has been verified by DNA as incorrect.

Randle's comedy achievement was celebrated in "Grin up North", a major touring exhibition that looked at the unique Northern sense of humour. He was most recently featured in an episode of BBC 4's Rude Britannia shown in June 2010.

In 2007, a celebratory plaque paid for by members of the Cuthbert Club was unveiled to Randle on Blackpool's North Pier. In 2010, the same organisation paid for the refurbishment of Randle's gravestone, which was unveiled in July 2010.

== Filmography ==
- Somewhere in England (1940)
- Somewhere in Camp (1942)
- Somewhere on Leave (1943)
- Somewhere in Civvies (1943)
- Home Sweet Home (1945)
- Holidays with Pay (1948)
- When You Come Home (1948)
- Somewhere in Politics (1948)
- School for Randle (1949)
- It's a Grand Life (1953)

== Bibliography and further reading ==
- Mather, Geoffrey (2003), Tacklers' Tales: A Humorous look at Lancashire, Palatine Books, ISBN 978-1-874181-19-4
- Nuttall, J. (1978) King Twist, ISBN 978-0710089779
- Fisher, J. (1973) Funny Way to be a Hero, ISBN 978-1848093133
- Band, B. (1995) Blackpool's Comedy Greats
- Richards, J. (1994) Stars in our Eyes
- Montgomery, J. (1954) Comedy Films : 1894–1954, ISBN 9780047910180
- Mellor, J. G. (1982) They Made us Laugh, ASIN: B00SLS58X2
- Williams, Philip Martin; Williams, David L (2006). Wired to the Moon: Frank Randle - A Life. History on Your Doorstep. ISBN 978-0-9518012-5-3.
- Williams, Philip Martin; Williams, David L (2011). The Theatrical World of Arthur Twist: The Early Career of Frank Randle. History on Your Doorstep. ISBN 978-0-9518012-7-7.
