= L'enfant et les sortilèges =

1925 opera by Maurice Ravel

- Opera by Maurice Ravel
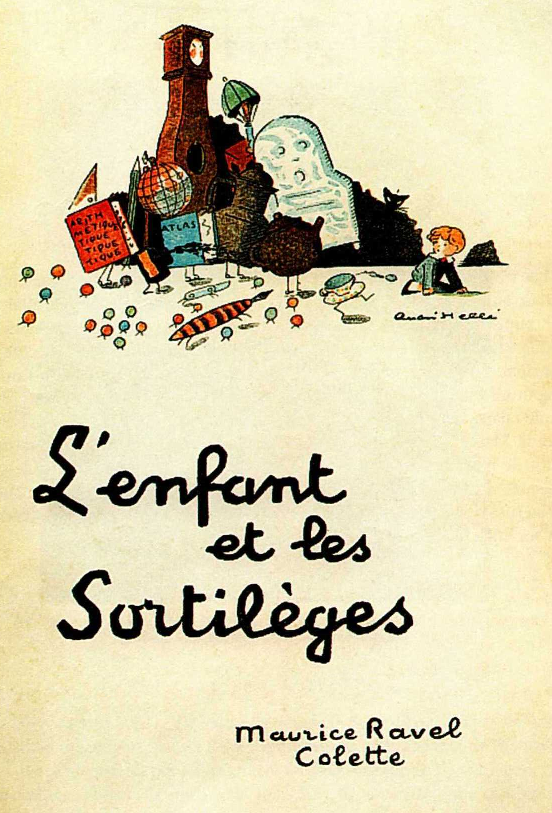
- Cover of the piano reduction, illustrated by André Hellé, 1925
- Librettist: Colette
- Language: French
- Premiere: 21 March 1925; Opéra de Monte-Carlo

L'enfant et les sortilèges: Fantaisie lyrique en deux parties (The Child and the Spells: A Lyric Fantasy in Two Parts) is an opera in one act, with music by Maurice Ravel to a libretto by Colette. It is Ravel's second opera, his first being L'heure espagnole. Written from 1917 to 1925, L'enfant et les sortilèges was first performed in Monte Carlo on 21 March 1925, conducted by Victor de Sabata.

After being offered the opportunity to write a musical work, Colette wrote the text in eight days. Several composers had proposed to Colette that she write to music, but she was only excited by the prospect of Ravel.

== Composition history ==
During World War I, the Opéra de Paris director Jacques Rouché asked Colette, whom he met at one of Marguerite de Saint-Marceaux's salons, to provide the text for a fairy ballet. Colette originally wrote the story under the title Divertissements pour ma fille. After Colette chose Ravel to set the text to music, a copy was sent to him in 1916 while he was still serving in the war; however, the mailed script was lost. In 1917, Ravel finally received a copy and agreed to compose the score, replying to Colette, "I would like to compose this, but I have no daughter". It was eventually agreed that the composition would be more of an operetta, but retain the ballet dance elements. Colette accordingly revised the text and developed a libretto.

Ravel stopped composition of the work in the spring of 1920, suffering from physical exhaustion and poor health. In the next few years he was compelled to complete the work by Raoul Gunsbourg, director of the Monte Carlo Opera, who had insisted Ravel write a sequel to L'Heure espagnole. By this time Ravel had become newly inspired by the stage presentations of American musicals and revues by composers such as George Gershwin. Ravel's work on the composition began to incorporate the musical style of these productions.

By early 1925 he had finally completed it. Colette, who had believed that the work would never be completed, expressed her extreme pleasure, believing that her modest writing had been raised beyond its initial scope. Now officially under the title of L'enfant et les sortilèges, the first performance took place on 21 March 1925 in Monte Carlo, conducted by Victor de Sabata, with ballet sequences choreographed by George Balanchine. Ravel said of the premiere production:

Our work requires an extraordinary production: the roles are numerous, and the phantasmagoria is constant. Following the principles of American operetta, dancing is continually and intimately intermingled with the action. Now the Monte Carlo Opera possesses a wonderful troupe of Russian dancers, marvelously directed by a prodigious ballet master, M. Balanchine. ... And let's not forget an essential element, the orchestra.

== Performance history ==
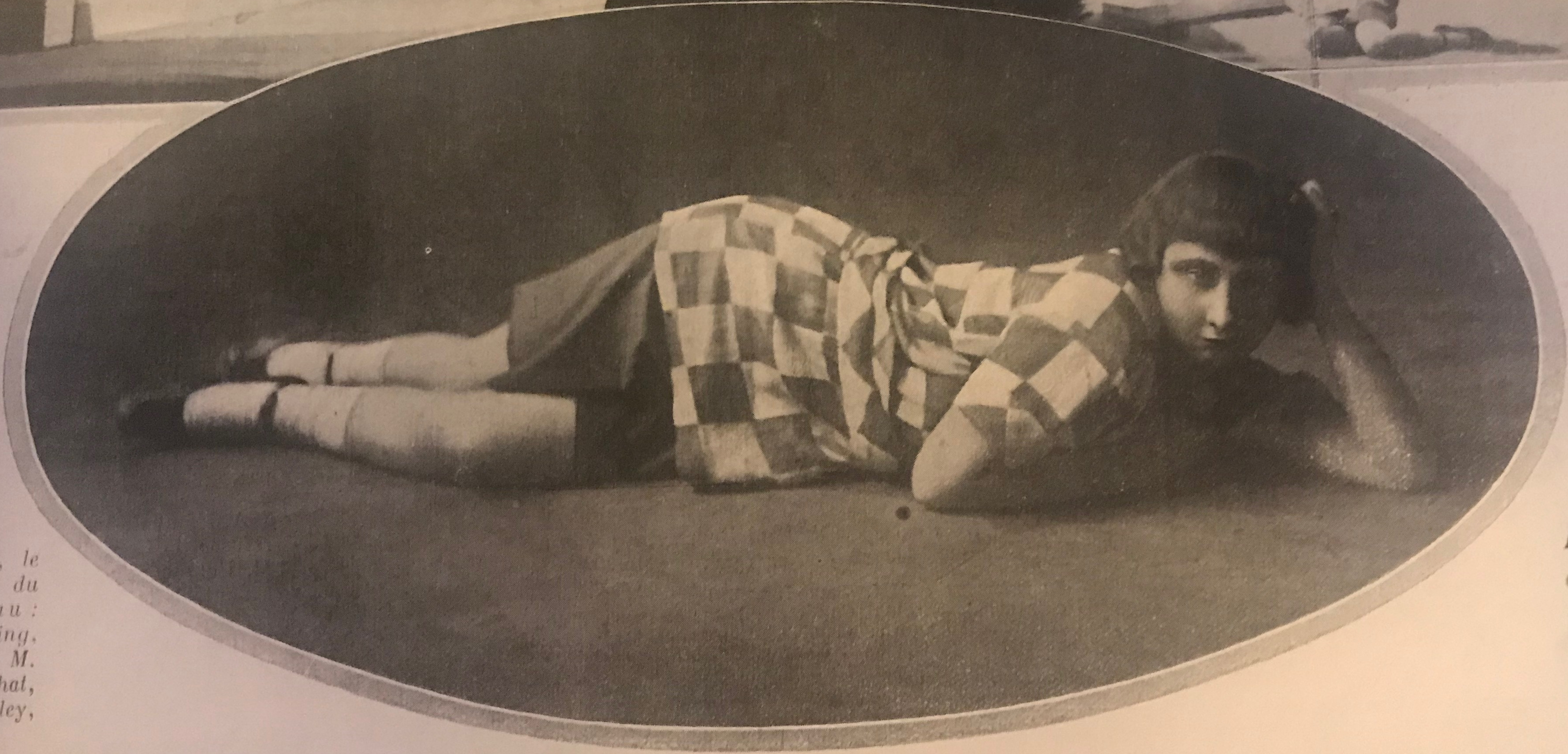
Marie-Therese Gauley as the child, in 1926

Marie-Thérèse Gauley sang the part of the child at both the premiere at the Opéra de Monte-Carlo and the first performance at the Opéra-Comique on 1 February 1926. The original cast also included Henri Fabert as Vieillard Arithmétique, Warnerey as the clock and cat, while at the Opéra-Comique, conducted by Albert Wolff and with choreography by Louise Virard, the cast included Germaine Féraldy, Mathilde Calvet, Madeleine Sibille, Roger Bourdin, René Hérent and Louis Guénot.

The opera was then seen in Prague (17 February 1927), Leipzig (6 May 1927) and Vienna (14 March 1929). The US premiere was given on 19 September 1930 by the San Francisco Opera. The Canadian premiere of the work was a film version made by CBC Television in 1950 with conductor Wilfrid Pelletier. The UK premiere of the opera occurred on 3 December 1958 at the Town Hall in Oxford conducted by Jack Westrup and directed by John Cox.

A production of the opera in 2020 by Vopera20.com addressed the COVID-19 pandemic and the effect its consequent lockdowns had on the arts. The production has received extensive praise for its artistry and creativity.

== Roles ==
The score specifies that fire / the princess / nightingale must be sung by the same singer, and the little old man and frog by the same singer. It is also specified that the following groups or pairs of roles can be sung by the same singer: mother / china cup / dragonfly; the bergère / owl; the female cat / the squirrel; the male cat / grandfather clock; the armchair / tree.

| Role | Voice type | Premiere cast, 21 March 1925 (Conductor: Victor de Sabata) |
|---|---|---|
| L'enfant, the child | mezzo-soprano; in modern performances also boy treble soprano | Marie-Thérèse Gauley |
Part one
| Maman, the mother represented by a huge skirt | contralto | Orsoni |
| Le fauteuil | bass | Julien Lafont |
| La bergère Louis XV | soprano | Narsay |
| L'horloge comtoise, a clock broken by the child | baritone | Edmond Warnéry |
| La théière, Wedgwood teapot | tenor | Gaston Dubois |
| La tasse chinoise, a broken china cup | mezzo-contralto | Lucy |
| Le feu, the fire in the fireplace | coloratura soprano | Mathilde |
| La princesse, the princess torn out of a storybook | coloratura soprano | Bilhon |
| Une pastourelle | soprano | Chorina |
| Un pâtre | contralto | |
| Le petit vieillard, the little old man (representing the torn arithmetic book) | tenor | Henri Fabert |
| Le chat | baritone | Chorina |
| La chatte | mezzo-soprano | Albertine Dubois-Lauger |
Part two
| La chouette | soprano | |
| L'arbre, a tree | bass | Vladimir Baidaroff |
| La libellule, a dragonfly | mezzo-soprano | Viardot |
| Le rossignol, a nightingale | coloratura soprano | Foliguet |
| La chauve-souris, widower bat | soprano | Lacroix |
| L'écureuil, a squirrel | mezzo-soprano | Lecourt |
| La rainette, the tree frog | tenor | Sollières |
Chorus: Le banc, le canapé, le pouf, la chaise de paille (children's chorus); Pâtres and pastoures (shepherds and shepherdesses - torn figures from the decorative wallpaper), Les chiffres (spiteful little numbers that assist the old man in tormenting the child (children's chorus)); trees, animals.

== Synopsis ==
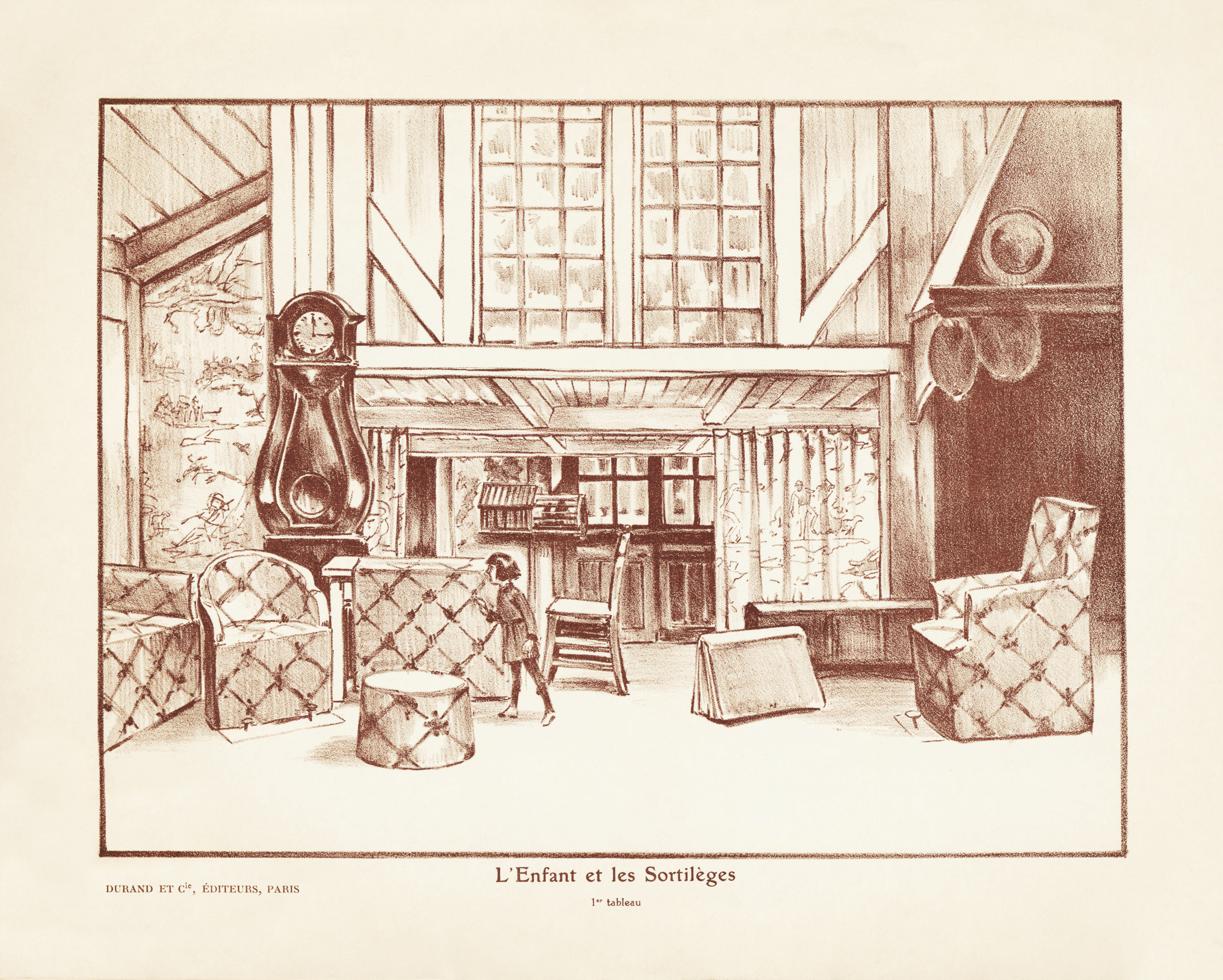
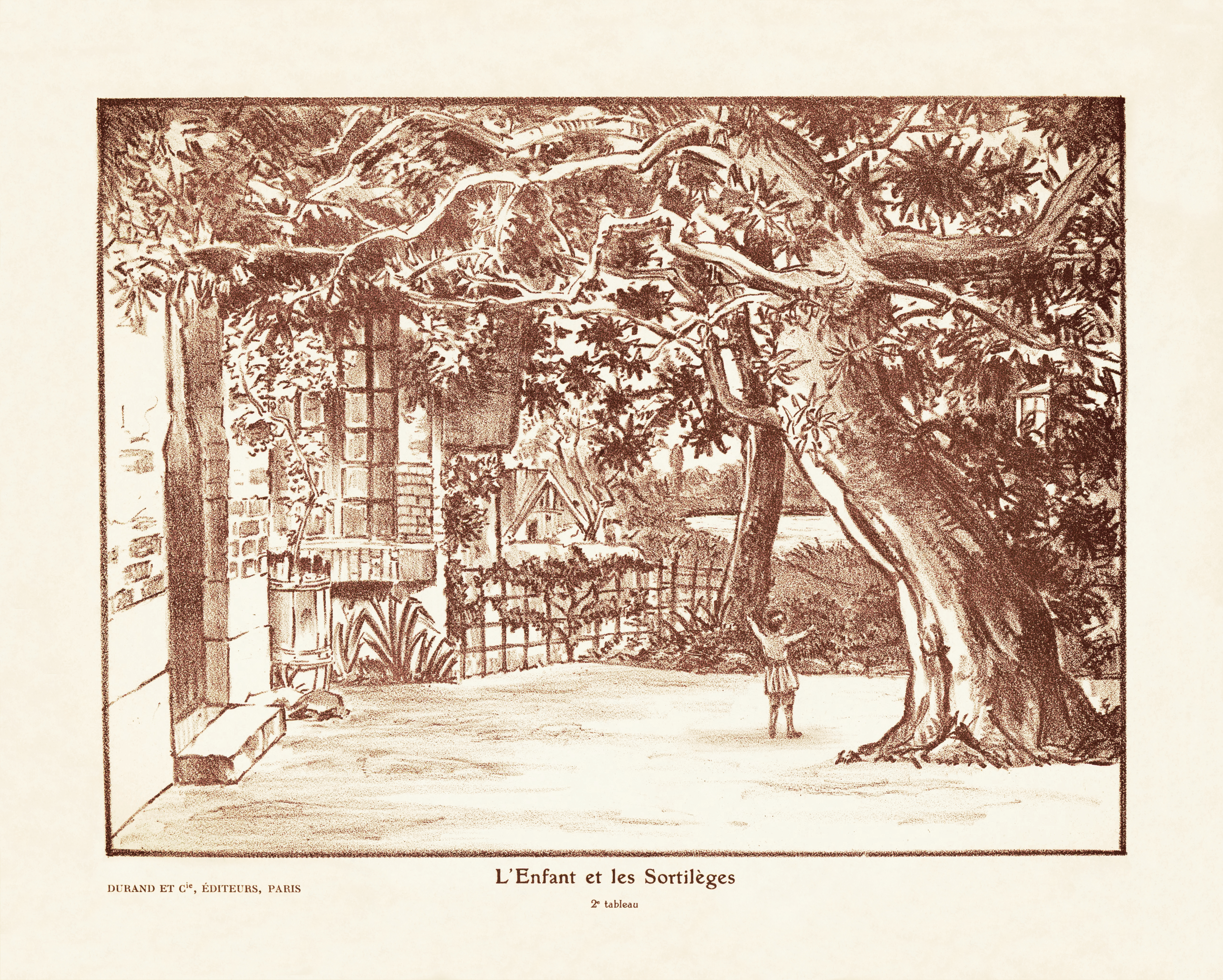
The two scenes in the Paris première (1926)

Place: An old-fashioned Normandy country home

Part 1

A rude child is reprimanded by the objects in his room, which he has been destroying. After being scolded by his mother in the beginning of the opera, the child throws a tantrum, destroying the room around him and harming the animals nearby. He is then surprised to find that the unhappy objects in his room come to life. The furniture and decorations begin to talk; even his homework takes shape as it becomes an old man and a chorus of numbers. They all sing out the pain and misery that the child inflicts on them and their wishes to punish him for his misdeeds.

Part 2

The bedroom becomes a garden filled with singing animals and plants which have been tortured by the child. The child attempts to make friends with the animals and plants, but they shun him because of the injuries he did to them earlier, before they could talk. They leave him aside, and in his loneliness, he cries out "Maman". At this, the animals turn on him and attack him in an act of vengeance, but they end up jostling among each other as the child is tossed aside. A squirrel is hurt, which causes the other animals to stop fighting. The child bandages the squirrel's wound and collapses exhausted. Seeing this act of kindness, the animals have a change of heart toward the child, and decide to try to help him home. They mimic the cry of "Maman", carry the child back to his house, and sing in praise of the child. The opera ends with the child singing "Maman", as he greets his mother, in the last bar of the score.

== Numbers ==
- "J'ai pas envie de faire ma page!" (I don't want to finish my homework!) - The Child
- "Bébé a été sage?" (Has my baby been good?) - Mother
- "Ça m'est égal!" (I don't care!) - The Child
- "Votre serviteur humble, Bergère" (Your humble servant, Bergère) - Bergère and Fauteuil
- "Ding, ding, ding, ding" - The Clock
- "How's your mug?" - The Teapot
- "Keng-ça-fou, mah-jong" - The Chinese Cup
- "Oh! Ma belle tasse chinoise!" (Ah! My beautiful Chinese Cup!) - The Child
- "Arrière ! Je réchauffe les bons" (Stand back! I warm the righteous) - The Fire
- "Adieu, Pastourelles!" (Farewell shepherdesses!) - Shepherds and Shepherdesses
- "Ah! C'est elle! C'est elle!" (Ah! It's her! It's her!) - The Child and the Princess
- "Toi, le coeur de la rose" (You, the heart of the rose) - The Child
- "Deux robinets coulent dans un réservoir!" (Two water faucets run into a reservoir!) - The Little Old Man and Numbers
- "Oh! Ma tête!" (Oh! My head!) - The Child
- "Duo miaulé" (Meowed duet) - The Cats
- "Musique d'insectes, de rainettes, etc." (Music of insects and frogs) - Chorus of the Animals
- "Ah! Quelle joie de te retrouver, Jardin!" (Ah! What joy to have found you again, Garden!) - The Child
- "Nos Blessures!" (Our wounds!) - The Trees
- "Où es tu, je te cherche..." (Where are you? I'm looking for you...) The Dragonfly, the Nightingale
- "Ronde des chauves-souris": 'Rends-la moi! Ma compagne, ma Chauve-Souris!" (Give her back! My companion the Bat!) The Bat
- "Danse des rainettes" (Dance of the Frogs)
- "Sauve-toi, sotte! Et la cage? La cage?" (Save yourself, dummy! And the Cage? The Cage?) - The Squirrel
- "Ah ! C'est l'enfant au couteau!" (Ah! It is the child with the knife!) - Ensemble
- "Il a pansé la plaie..." (He has bandaged the wound) - Ensemble
- "Il est bon, l'enfant, il est sage" (He is good, the child, he is good) - Ensemble

== Instrumentation ==
Woodwind: 2 flutes, piccolo (alternating third flute), slide whistle (flûte à coulisse), 2 oboes, English horn, 2 clarinets, 1 E-flat clarinet, 1 bass clarinet, 2 bassoons, contrabassoon
Brass: 4 horns, 3 trumpets, 3 trombones, tuba
Percussion: timpani, xylophone, bass drum, triangle, whip, cymbals, tam-tam, rachet, cheese grater (scraped with a triangle beater), wood block, wind machine, crotales, snare drum
Keyboards: celesta, piano (or luthéal),
Strings: harp, strings

== Music ==
The opera calls for a large orchestra, a mixed chorus of adults, a chorus of children, and eight soloists, most of whom individually play a number of characters. The scale of the cast and fantastic setting make the opera difficult to stage, which helps to explain why the work is not performed often. Ravel uses various subtle leitmotifs throughout the work, and there is considerable virtuosity in the instrumental writing. Yet the orchestra plays a mostly secondary role to the sung melodies: Ravel explained that he was following the style of Gershwin and American operettas of the time. Ravel contrasted the work to his previous opera, L'heure espagnole:

More than ever, I am for melody. Yes, melody, bel canto, vocalises, vocal virtuosity – this is for me a point of departure. If, in L'heure espagnole the theatrical action itself demanded that the music be only the commentary on each word and gesture, here, on the contrary, this lyric fantasy calls for melody, nothing but melody.... The score of L'enfant et les sortilèges is a very smooth blending of all styles from all epochs, from Bach up to ... Ravel.

The Child's 'regretful aria' was inspired according to Ravel by "Adieu, notre petite table" in Massenet's Manon. The opera was initially well received in Monte Carlo, but in a Paris production the following year it was less successful. André Messager criticized the purposely imitative nature of the music, but the composers of Les Six were impressed. His cat duet Duo miaulé is often seen as a parody of Wagner, which was quite controversial, although Arthur Honegger praised this piece in particular.

== Recordings ==
| Year | Cast | Conductor, Opera House and Orchestra | Label |
|---|---|---|---|
| 1947 | Nadine Sautereau, Denise Scharley, Solange Michel, Odette Turba-Rabier, Martha Angelici, Claudine Verneuil, Joseph Peyron, André Vessières, Yvon le Marc'Hadour | Ernest Bour, French National Radio Orchestra and Radio France Chorus | Audio CD: Testament, Cat: SBT1044 |
| 1954 | Flore Wend, Marie-Luise de Montmollin, Geneviève Touraine, Adrienne Migliette, Suzanne Danco, Juliette Bise, Gisèle Bobillier, Hugues Cuénod, Pierre Mollet, Lucien Lovano | Ernest Ansermet, Orchestre de la Suisse Romande and Motet Choir of Geneva | Audio CD: Decca, Cat: 433400 |
| 1960 | Françoise Ogéas, Jeannine Collard, Jane Berbié, Sylvaine Gilma, Colette Herzog, Heinz Rehfuss, Camille Maurane, Michel Sénéchal | Lorin Maazel, French National Radio Orchestra | Audio CD: DG, Cat: 423718, 449769, 474890 |
| 1981 | Susan Davenny Wyner, Jocelyne Taillon, Arleen Auger, Jane Berbié, Linda Finnie, Linda Richardson, Philip Langridge, Philippe Huttenlocher, Jules Bastin | André Previn, London Symphony Orchestra and Ambrosian Singers | Audio CD: EMI, Cat: EMX2241 |
| 1987 | Colette Alliot-Lugaz, Audrey Michael, Arlette Chedel, Isabel Garcisanz, Michel Sénéchal, Philippe Huttenlocher, Michel Brodard | Armin Jordan, Orchestre de la Suisse Romande, Chœur de la Radio Suisse Romande | Audio LP & CD: Erato, Cat: 440333 |
| 1992 | Colette Alliot-Lugaz, Claudine Carlson, Catherine Dubosc, Marie-Françoise Lefort, Georges Gautier, Didier Henry, Lionel Sarrazin | Charles Dutoit, Montreal Symphony Orchestra | Audio CD: Decca, Cat: 440333 |
| 1992 | Martine Mahé, Arlette Chedel, Elisabeth Vidal, Michèle Lagrange, Léonardo Pezzino, Vincent le Texier, Marc Barrard | Alain Lombard, Bordeaux-Aquitaine National Orchestra and Bordeaux Theatre Chorus | Audio CD: Auvidis, Cat: V4670 |
| 1997 | Pamela Helen Stephen, Anne-Marie Owens, Elizabeth Futral, Juanita Lascarro, Mary Plazas, Rinat Shaham, Mark Tucker, David Wilson-Johnson, Robert Lloyd | André Previn, London Symphony Orchestra, London Symphony Chorus and New London Children's Choir | Audio CD: DG, 457589 |
| 2008 | Annick Massis, François le Roux, Jean-Paul Fouchécourt, José Van Dam, Magdalena Kožená, Mojca Erdmann, Nathalie Stutzmann, Sophie Koch | Simon Rattle, Berlin Philharmonic Orchestra | EMI Music |
| 2009 | Julie Boulianne, Geneviève Desprésis, Kirsten Gunlogson, Philippe Castagner, Ian Greenlaw, Kevin Short, Agathe Martel, Cassandre Prévost, Julie Cox | Alastair Willis, Nashville Symphony Orchestra, Nashville Symphony Chorus, Chicago Symphony Chorus, and Chattanooga Boys Choir | Audio CD: Naxos, 8.660215 |
| 2015 | Isabel Leonard, Paul Gay, Yvonne Naef, Anna Christy, Marie Lenormand, Elliot Madore, Jean-Paul Fouchécourt, Kanae Fujitani | Seiji Ozawa, Saito Kinen Orchestra, SKF Matsumoto Choir, and SKF Children's Chorus | Audio CD: Decca, 0289 478 6760 9 |
| 2015 | Hélène Hébrard, Delphine Galou, Julie Pasturaud, Marc Barrard, Ingrid Perruche, Nicolas Courjal, Jean-Paul Fouchécourt, Annick Massis | Leonard Slatkin, Orchestre National de Lyon, Chœur Britten, Jeune Chœur symphonique, and Maîtrise de l'Opéra National de Lyon | Audio CD: Naxos, 8.660336 |
| 2017 | Camille Poul, Marie Karall, Julie Pasturaud, Marc Barrard, Maïlys de Villoutreys, Paul Gay, François Piolino, Annick Massis | Stéphane Denève, Stuttgart Radio Symphony Orchestra, South West German Radio Vocal Ensemble, and Cantus Juvenum Karlsruhe | Audio CD: SWR Classic, SWR19033CD |
| 2017 | Chloé Briot, Sabine Devieilhe, François Piolino, Jodie Devos, Julie Pasturaud, Jean-François Lapointe, Nathalie Stutzmann, Nicolas Courjal | Mikko Franck, Orchestre philharmonique de Radio France, Chœur de Radio France, and Maîtrise De Radio France | Audio CD: Erato 0190295896928 |
