= Cendrillon (Massenet) =

1899 opera by Jules Massenet

- Opera by Jules Massenet
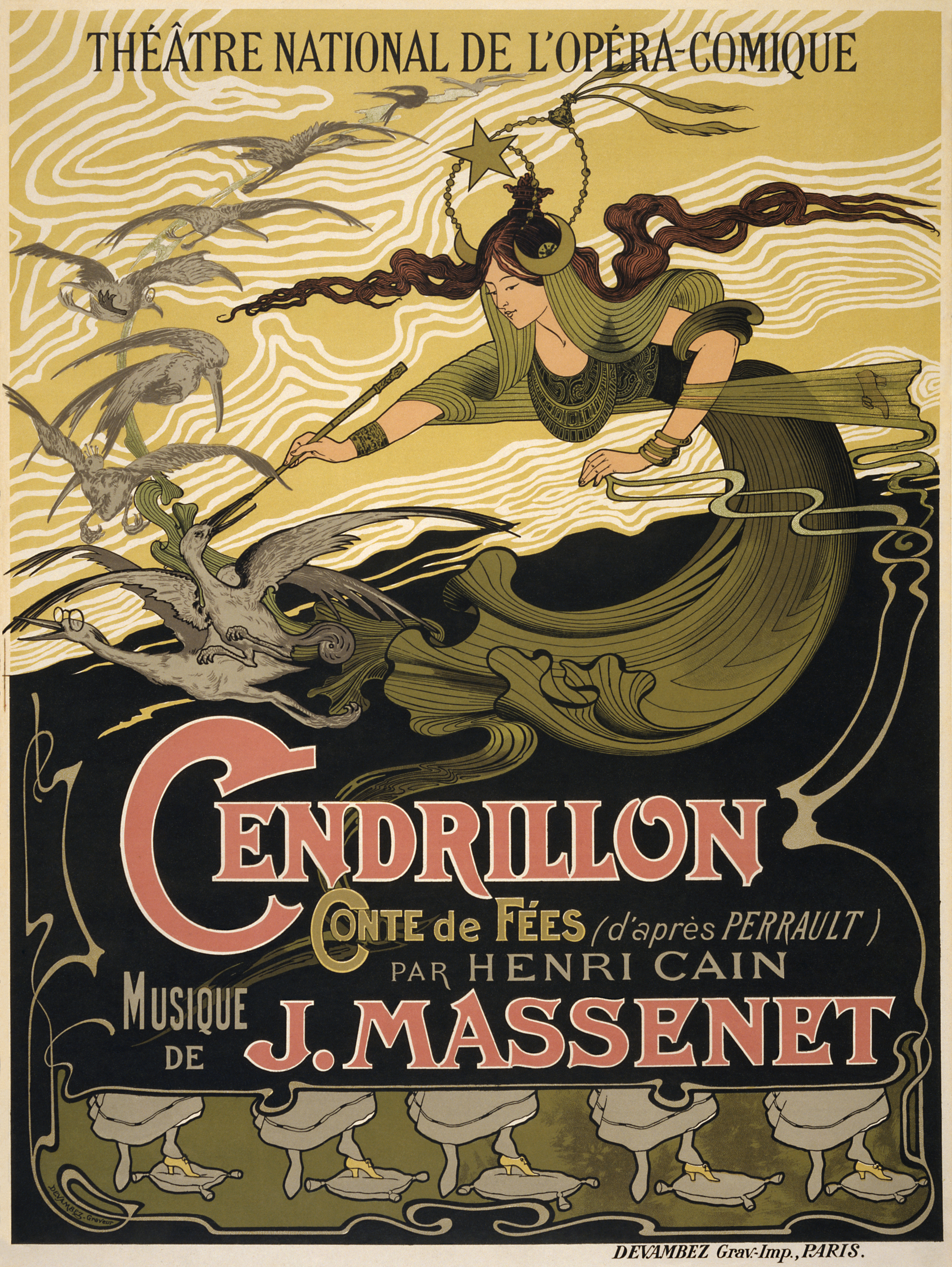
- Art Nouveau poster announcing the premiere performance in 1899
- Librettist: Henri Caïn
- Language: French
- Based on: Perrault's 1697 version of Cinderella
- Premiere: 24 May 1899; Théâtre National de l'Opéra-Comique, Paris

Cendrillon (French pronunciation: [sɑ̃dʁijɔ̃]; Cinderella) is an opera—described as a "fairy tale"—in four acts by Jules Massenet to a French libretto by Henri Caïn based on Perrault's version of the Cinderella fairy tale in his 1697 collection Histoires ou contes du temps passé.

It had its premiere performance on 24 May 1899 at the Opéra-Comique in Paris.

The New Grove Dictionary of Opera notes that Massenet's sense of humor and wit is more evident in this work, and the use of recurrent motifs is more discreet, while the love music "reminds us how well Massenet knew his Wagner". Albert Carré (director of the Opéra-Comique and producer of the first staging) persuaded the composer to drop a prologue introducing the characters, but a brief epilogue survives. Another writer comments that Massenet's perfectly proportioned score moves from a scene worthy of Jean-Baptiste Lully's Armide (in Cendrillon's monologue), through Rossinian vocalises and archaic orchestrations to ballet movements on a par with Tchaikovsky.

== Composition history ==
The scenario was conceived by Massenet and Caïn when they were in London for the world premiere of Massenet's La Navarraise in June 1893. The composer began work on the score in Pont-de-l'Arche, with the final touches being made in Nice in 1895/96. At the time of the premiere, Massenet had announced in Le Figaro that Cendrillon would be his last lyric work (although in fact several more followed). The autograph score is dedicated to "Mademoiselle Julie Guiraudon", who created the title role and subsequently married Henri Caïn.

== Performance history ==
19th century

As one of the first operas to be produced at the newly rebuilt Salle Favart (the third theatre of that name and the home of the Opéra-Comique), it enjoyed the modern facilities provided during the refurbishment, including special effects on stage and electricity throughout the theater. The original production had sets designed by Lucien Jusseaume (act 1), Eugène Carpezat (act 2), Auguste Alfred Rubé (act 3, scene 2), and Marcel Jambon (act 4).

Massenet took a close interest in the first production, attending 60 out of 98 rehearsals at the Opéra-Comique prior to the premiere. The first performance was given at the Opéra-Comique in Paris on 24 May 1899, at the height of Massenet's success. As was his usual practice, Massenet avoided the first night, but received a telegram from Fugère the next day at Enghien-les-Bains (where he was staying with his wife), recording its triumph.

20th century and beyond

An immediate success, with fifty performances in its first season, it was revived at the Gaîté-Lyrique in Paris in 1909 with Geneviève Vix as the Prince and Rose Heilbronner in the title role. Cendrillon was performed in Brussels and Milan in 1899, quickly followed by other Italian cities, New Orleans in 1902, and New York in 1912. Maggie Teyte in the title role and Mary Garden as the Prince led the cast in Chicago in 1911. The UK stage premiere was given in Swindon, Wiltshire in 1939, thanks to Lord Berners.

In the post-World War II years, the opera has been seen in Brussels and Liege in 1982 (with Frederica von Stade, Ann Murray and Jules Bastin), and in 1993 Patrick Fournillier conducted a production by Robert Carsen for Welsh National Opera with Rebecca Evans in the title role, Lillian Watson as the Fairy Godmother, Pamela Helen Stephen as the Prince, Felicity Palmer as Madame de la Haltière and Donald Maxwell as Pandolfe.

Further productions included Geneva in 1998, Strasbourg in 2003, the Santa Fe Opera in 2006 (with Joyce DiDonato and Eglise Gutiérrez in Laurent Pelly's production), Brussels and Luxembourg in 2007, New York in 2008, Dresden, Montreal and Brisbane in 2010, Vancouver in February 2011, and the Juilliard School in New York City in April 2014.

Having been produced at the Châtelet in 1984, in a staging borrowed from New York City Opera (with Maureen Forrester as Madame de la Haltière) Cendrillon was mounted in Paris at the Opéra-Comique in March 2011 conducted by Marc Minkowski. In July 2011 the Royal Opera House, London used Pelly's production, with the conductor Bertrand de Billy (later issued as a DVD), and Barcelona's Gran Teatre del Liceu did likewise in December 2013. Cendrillon waited 119 years for its premiere at the Metropolitan Opera; the 2018 production featured DiDonato and Alice Coote in Pelly's production.

== Roles ==
Roles, voice types, premiere cast
Role	Voice type	Premiere cast, 24 May 1899 Conductor: Alexandre Luigini
Cendrillon (Cinderella)	soprano	Julia Guiraudon
Madame de la Haltière, stepmother of Cendrillon	contralto	Blanche Deschamps-Jéhin
Le Prince Charmant (Prince Charming)	falcon or 'soprano de sentiment'	Marie-Louise van Émelen
La Fée (the Fairy)	light soprano	Georgette Bréjean-Gravière
Noémie, stepsister of Cendrillon	soprano	Jeanne Tiphaine
Dorothée, stepsister of Cendrillon	mezzo-soprano	Jeanne Marié de L'Isle
Pandolfe, Cendrillon's father	'basse chantante' or baritone	Lucien Fugère
Le Roi (the King)	baritone	Dubosc
Le Doyen de la Faculté	tenor (trial)	Gourdon
Le Surintendant des plaisirs	baritone	Étienne Troy
Le Premier Ministre	'basse chantante' or baritone	Gustave Huberdeau
1st spirit	mezzo-soprano	Marie Delorn
2nd spirit	soprano	Françoise Oswald
3rd spirit	soprano	Vilma
4th spirit	mezzo-soprano	Stéphane
5th spirit	soprano	Craponne
6th spirit	soprano	Fouqué
Voice of the royal herald (off-stage)	spoken	
A ballerina		Jeanne Chasles
Chorus: servants, courtiers, doctors, ministers, lords and ladies; Ballet: will-o'-the-wisps, tailors, hairdressers, milliners, a fiancé and fiancée, daughters of nobility, princesses, dewdrops

== Synopsis ==
A prologue in front of the curtain, suppressed before the premiere, introduced the characters and invited the audience to enjoy the fairy-tale "to escape from dark realities (pour échapper à des réalités sombres) and to believe in the "fabulous" (fabuleux). The final words of the prologue are repeated at the end of the opera.

=== Act 1 ===
Chez Madame de la Haltière

A large room in the house of Madame de la Haltière with a chimney grate. Servants are busy preparing for the ball. Pandolfe, the second husband of Madame de la Haltière, wonders why he forsook the calm of his country home to marry a selfish countess with her two daughters, and pities the lot of his own loving daughter Lucette (Cendrillon). Madame de la Haltière and her daughters Noémie and Dorothée dress while the mother tells them how to attract the prince's attention at the ball. Late in leaving, Pandolfe resigns himself to accompanying them. Cendrillon enters, singing of how she wishes she could also have gone to the ball. After completing her chores she falls asleep by the warm chimney hearth. The Fairy Godmother and her attendants come in, transform Cendrillon into magnificent clothes for the ball, but warn the girl that their spell will only last until midnight, and that the glass slippers will protect her from being recognized by her family. Cendrillon promises to return at midnight, and sets off for the ball.

=== Act 2 ===
The royal palace

At the royal hall, all is excitement, except for the prince who is melancholic. The king reminds him that he must choose a wife. After five ballet entrées where the eligible princesses present themselves to the prince, a heavenly unknown beauty (Cendrillon) enters and enchants everyone—except for Madame de la Haltière and the two step-sisters. The prince and Cendrillon fall in love at first sight but when the clock strikes midnight Cendrillon runs off, as the stunned prince looks on.

=== Act 3 ===
First tableau: The return from the ball

Cendrillon returns to the house, having lost one of her glass slippers in her flight, and relives the charm of the ball. Her fine gown has changed back into a plain dress. She hears the returning family carriage and hides in her room. Madame de la Haltière and her daughters insist that the prince rejected the unknown beauty. Cendrillon is on the point of fainting, when her father angrily sends the other women from the room. Tenderly he promises Cendrillon that they will return to his country home. When he has left, she recalls her mother's death, and to prevent her father any more pain, Cendrillon flees into the night, to die on her own.

Second Tableau: The Fairies' Oak

Under a magic oak tree in an enchanted forest, the prince and Cendrillon are drawn together by the fairies. An enchanted arbour of flowers blocks their view of each other but they recognize each other's voice and sing of their love. The prince offers his heart to see his beloved. The flowers disappear and the lovers, surrounded by the spirits, fall into a slumber in each other's arms.

=== Act 4 ===
First Tableau: The terrace chez Cendrillon

Back in Cendrillon's home, Pandolfe watches over his sleeping daughter, who was found months previously by a stream. Cendrillon awakes and her father relates how in her delirium she spoke to him about the prince, the oak, and the slipper. Pandolfe convinces her that it was all a dream. Madame de la Haltière and her daughters appear with the news about an assembly of all eligible princesses at the King's palace. As a royal herald summons the princesses to go and try on the glass slipper, Cendrillon realizes that her dream was true. During the march of the princesses, the scene changes.

Second Tableau: A great hall in the palace

Back at the ballroom in the palace the prince recognizes Cendrillon among the princesses. The lovers are reunited and acclaimed by all present, even Madame de la Haltière. All turn to the audience and, out of character, sing that the piece is over and they have done their best to send the audience through "les beaux pays bleus (the beautiful blue countries)".

== Music ==
"Marche des Princesses" from Cendrillon
Performed by the United States Air Force Band

The part of Prince Charming is a breeches role, sung by a Falcon soprano—or soprano de sentiment—according to the libretto, a dark dramatic and characteristically French soprano voice. There is no authority for transposing this role for a tenor. This voice type is contrasted in Cendrillon's other scenes with the coloratura writing for the fairy godmother, which is characterised by trills and arpeggios. The 18th-century is echoed in witty pastiche of galant music, such as the trio of harp, viola d'amore, and flute that fails to rouse the melancholy and silent prince at the opening of act 2. The score includes a ballet, a series of entrées at the ball of princesses who fail to satisfy the Prince, contrasted with the spectral ballet under a "bluish light" in act 3, where Caïn interposes an episode in which Lucette (as Cendrillon is called) and her Prince are kept apart and tested by the arts of la Fée (Fairy Godmother).

== Noted arias ==
- Ah! que mes soeurs sont heureuses (Cendrillon) – act 1
- Ah! douce enfant (La Fée) – act 1
- Coeur sans amour (Le Prince Charmant) – act 2
- Enfin, je suis ici (Cendrillon) – act 3
- À deux genoux (Le Prince Charmant, Cendrillon) – act 3

== Recordings ==
Year	Cast: Cendrillon; The Prince; Mme. de la Haltière; Pandolfe	Conductor, opera house and orchestra	Label
1978	Frederica von Stade, Nicolai Gedda, Jane Berbié, Jules Bastin	Julius Rudel, Ambrosian Opera Chorus and the Philharmonia Orchestra	CD: Sony Classical, Cat: SM2K91178
1979	Frederica von Stade, Delia Wallis, Maureen Forrester, Louis Quilico	Mario Bernardi; National Arts Centre Orchestra and Chorus. (Audio recording of a performance (or of performances) in the National Arts Centre, Ottawa, July)	CD: Celestial; Cat: CA 62; CD: Gala; Cat: GL 100 724
2011	Joyce DiDonato, Alice Coote, Ewa Podleś, Jean-Philippe Lafont	Bertrand de Billy, Orchestra & Chorus of the Royal Opera House, Laurent Pelly, stage director	DVD: Virgin Classical, Cat: 6025099
2017	Kim-Lillian Strebel, Anat Czarny, Anja Jung, Juan Orozco	Fabrice Bollon, Freiburg Philharmonic, Choruses of the Freiburg Theater; Barbara Mundel, stage director Olga Motta, stage director, set and costume designer (recorded 30 April and 4 May)	DVD: Naxos; Cat. no. 2.110563
2018	Joyce DiDonato, Alice Coote, Stephanie Blythe, Laurent Naouri	Bertrand de Billy, Orchestra & Chorus of the Metropolitan Opera, Laurent Pelly, producer and costume designer (recorded live on 28 April)	HD streaming video: Met Opera on Demand
