= Puck (opera) =

1949 opéra-féerique by Marcel Delannoy

Puck is an opéra-féerique in three acts with music by Marcel Delannoy, premiered in 1949. The French libretto was adapted by André Boll from Shakespeare's A Midsummer Night's Dream.

== Background ==
It was first performed at the Opéra Municipal in Strasbourg on 29 January 1949 directed by Roger Lalande with scenery and costumes designed by Boll. The Strasbourg production was seen at the Théâtre des Champs-Élysées on 17 November 1949 and at the Theater des Westens in Berlin on 22 September 1951. The Paris Conservatoire Orchestra conducted by André Cluytens played a suite from Puck at their concert on 21 May 1956.

There was much media coverage of the premiere and a generally positive welcome for the work. The story is loosely based on the play by Shakespeare and mixes traditional opéra comique elements with dance (the title role) and actors. Grove talks of the opera's "mobile declamation oscillating between speech and song".

== Roles and role creators ==
Role	Voice type	Cast of premiere, 29 January 1949. Conductor: Ernest Bour
Puck	dancer	Roland April
Titania	soprano	Mona Million
Obéron	bass	Georges Jongejeans
A fairy	soprano	Nany Arnaud
Thésée	tenor	Roger Barnier
Démétrius	tenor	Paul Derenne
Hélène	mezzo-soprano	Marika Stephanidès
Lysandre	bariton-martin	Georges Verguet
Hermia	soprano	Jacqueline Drozin
Quince	tenor	Kedroff
Bottom	tenor	René Hérent
Snug	baritone	Akiaroff
Flute	bass	Borissoff
Égée	spoken	Paul Parmentier
Hippolyte	silent	Eveline Mischke
