= Marie-Thérèse Gauley =

French opera singer (1903–1992)

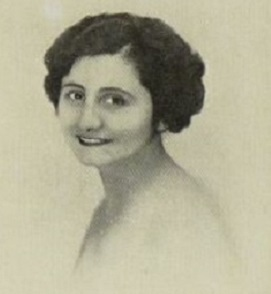
- Born: Marie-Thérèse Andrée Gauley; 15 February 1903; Paris, France
- Died: 23 January 1992 (aged 88); Malakoff, France
- Occupation: opera singer

Marie-Thérèse Gauley (15 February 1903 – 23 January 1992) was a French opera and concert singer who sang leading soprano and mezzo-soprano roles at the Opéra-Comique in Paris as well as in other French cities and abroad. She was also heard in early broadcasts on French radio and made several recordings for Disques Odéon. Amongst the roles she created were The Child in Ravel's opera L'enfant et les sortilèges.

== Life and career ==
Gauley was born in Paris to Armand Gauley (1864–1922), an actor at the Théâtre de l'Odéon, and Marie Gauley-Texier (1866–1948), a mezzo-soprano who sang at the Opéra de Paris. The couple also taught diction and singing to private pupils at their apartments on the Avenue de Tourville. As a child she sometimes performed with her parents, including two matinees given by the Baroness de Beaulieu in 1913.

Gauley was a student at the Paris Conservatory from 1921 until 1924. In her final year she won the conservatory's first prizes in singing and opéra comique. She made her stage debut on 2 November 1924 as Olympia in Offenbach's Les contes d'Hoffmann at the Théâtre de l'Opéra-Comique in Paris. It was the beginning of a long and successful career with the company.

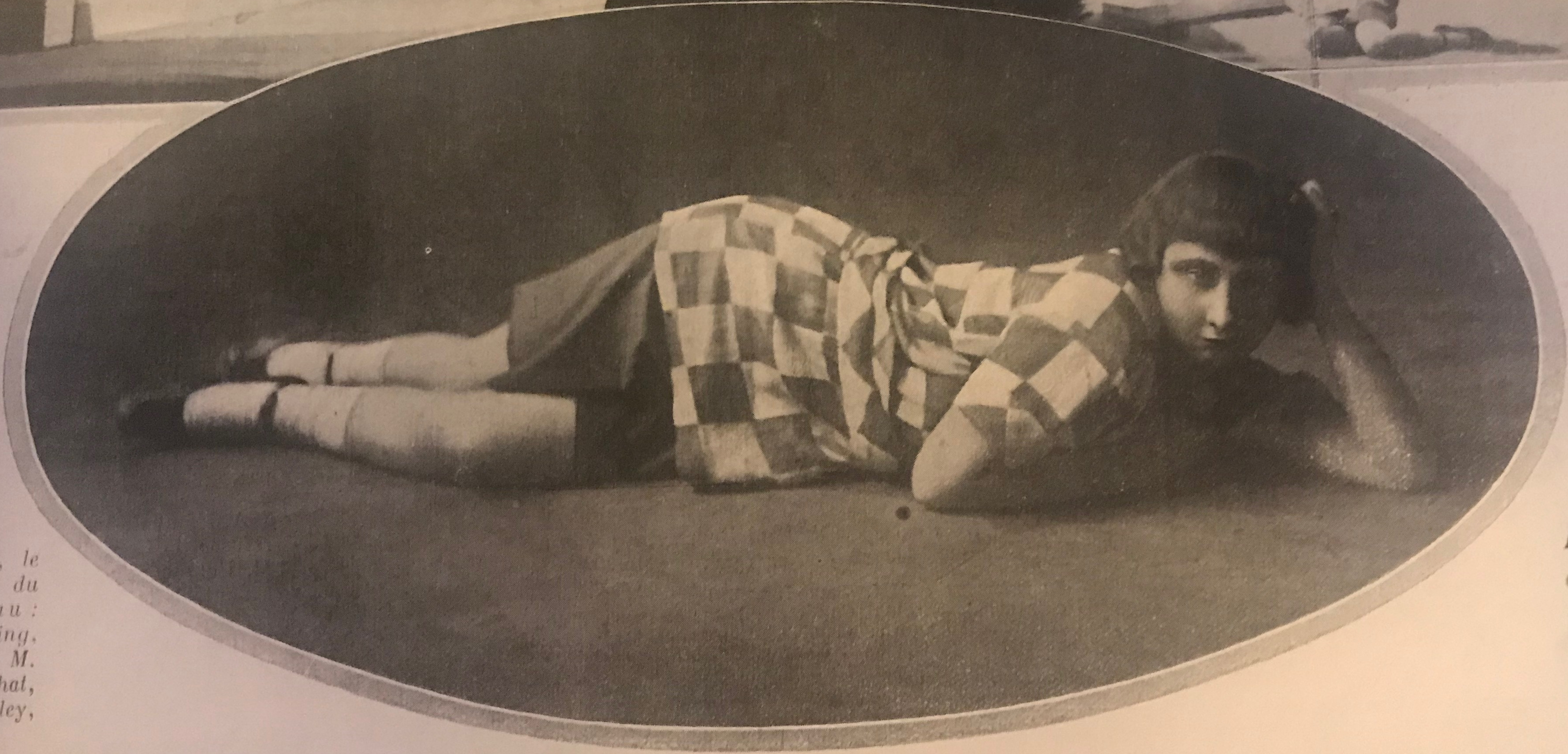
Gauley as The Child in L'enfant et les sortilèges, Paris 1926

Gauley had particular success at the Opéra-Comique as Rosina in The Barber of Seville and in the title roles of Mireille and Lakmé. She recorded excerpts from all three of these operas for the Odéon label. Her petite figure led to her successful assumption of child characters as well. She sang The Child in Ravel's L'enfant et les sortilèges at both its world premiere in Monaco in 1925 and in its first performance at the Opéra-Comique in 1926. Ravel attributed the opera's success in part to Gauley's acting and her "ravishing voice." Her other child roles included Yniold, the young son of Golaud in Pelléas et Mélisande and Andreloun, the shepherd boy in Mireille.

From the late 1920s through the 1930s, Gauley appeared in several world premieres of contemporary operas and had a parallel career as a concert singer. She also appeared in radio broadcasts on Radio Paris and Le Poste parisien. Although her operatic career was primarily based at the Opéra-Comique, she appeared at Opéra de Monte-Carlo in 1927 where she sang all three of the lead female roles in Les contes d'Hoffmann and Sophie in Der Rosenkavalier. She also appeared as a guest artist at La Monnaie in Brussels and in the opera houses of Amsterdam, Geneva, Liège, Lyon, Strasbourg, and Aix-les-Bains. As late as 1950 she sang in Paul Dukas's Ariane et Barbe-bleue in its first performance at the Teatro San Carlo in Naples.

After her retirement from the stage, Gauley taught singing in Paris until 1987. She died five years later at the age of 88 in Malakoff, a suburb of Paris.

== Roles created ==
Gauley's roles in world premiere performances included:

- The Child in Maurice Ravel's L'enfant et les sortilèges, Opéra de Monte-Carlo, Monaco, 1925
- Innocent in Marcel Delannoy's Le Poirier de misère, Théâtre de l'Opéra-Comique, Paris, 1927
- Henriette in Henri Büsser's La pie borgne, Théâtre du Grand Cercle, Aix-les-Bains, 1927
- Rose in Francis Bousquet's Sarati le Terrible, Théâtre de l'Opéra-Comique, Paris, 1928
- Claudine in Max d'Ollone's Georges Dandin, Théâtre de l'Opéra-Comique, Paris, 1930
- Isidore in Omer Letorey's Le Sicilien ou L'Amour peintre, Théâtre de l'Opéra-Comique, Paris, 1930
- Francezine in Jean Roger-Ducasse's Cantegril, Théâtre de l'Opéra-Comique, Paris, 1931
- Columbine in Robert Planel's Idylle funambulesque, Institut de France, Paris, 1933
