= René Hérent =

French tenor

René Hérent (born Cambrai 16 May 1897, died Paris January 1966) was a French tenor whose career was centred on the Opéra-Comique in Paris, where he played supporting roles for many years, and left several recordings.

== Life and career ==
Hérent made his debut on 17 August 1918 as Guillot de Morfontaine in Massenet's Manon. At the Opéra-Comique he created many roles, either in Paris or world premieres, including Mercure in Amphytrion 38, the dancing master in Ariadne auf Naxos, Un valet in Don Quichotte, le vieillard and la rainette in L'enfant et les sortilèges, Mémucan-Aman in Esther de Carpentras, Ouf 1er in L'étoile, Prince de Chabran in Femme nue, Vašek in La fiancée vendue, Galipot in Frasquita, Lubin in Georges Dandin, Betto in Gianni Schicchi, Mouzzafer in Le Hulla, Madame Poiretapée in Mesdames de la Halle, Machecourt in Mon oncle Benjamin, Bertrand in Le roi d’Yvetot, Ali in Le Sicilien, Laguigne in Le testament de la tante Caroline, Le patron in Ciboulette, and Sellem in Le libertin. He created the role of the Prince de Chabran in La Femme nue by Février in Monte Carlo in 1929 and Bottom in Puck by Delannoy in Strasbourg in 1949.

His repertoire at the Salle Favart also included Léveillé, Remendado, Dickson, Bardolphe, Torquemada, Le poète, le noctambule, Sganarelle, Doublemain, Cantarelli, Bertrand, and Schmidt.

In light opera Hérent sang Joseph Calicot in the Paris premiere of Madame de Pompadour at the Théâtre Marigny and Periola in Mandrin at the Théâtre Mogador. In 1955, Hérent sang Panatellas in a Poste National radio production of La Périchole, with Fanély Revoil in the title role and Duvaleix as the Vice-roi.

He also sang as a guest artist at the Prague National Opera, Covent Garden, Geneva, Monte Carlo Opera, Brussels, Amsterdam and in Rio de Janeiro.

== Discography ==
On records, Hérent may be heard as Guillot in the classic 1955 Opéra-Comique recording of Manon conducted by Pierre Monteux, in L'heure espagnole conducted by Andre Cluytens (Torquemada), Le petit duc under Gressier (Frimousse), L'étoile under Désormière (Ouf), La bohème (Alcindoro) under Tzipine, Otello (Cassio) under Gressier, La Mascotte (Rocco) under Gressier, and Boris Godunov (Missail) under Ansermet.

He also recorded excerpts from Passionément, La Petite dame du train bleu, Phi-Phi and Mandrin in the 1930s.
