= Justin de Selves =

French politician

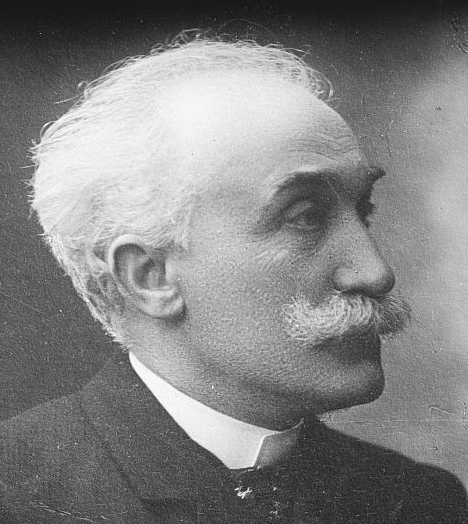
Justin de Selves.

Justin Germain Casimir de Selves (French pronunciation: [ʒystɛ̃ ʒɛʁmɛ̃ kazimiʁ də sɛlv]; 19 July 1848 in Toulouse – 12 January 1934 in Paris) was a French politician.

He served as a lieutenant during the Franco-Prussian war, before being promoted to captain in December 1870. He was Director-General of Posts and Telegraphs from 1890 to 1896. He became a senator for Tarn-et-Garonne in 1909. He was Prefect of the Department of the Seine for fifteen years, giving up the post when he was appointed Foreign Minister, on 26 June 1911. He resigned the position on 9 January 1912 after refusing to confirm to President Clemenceau statements made by Premier Caillaux. From 1924 to 1927 he was President of the Senate, but lost his seat in 1927 to a Radical Socialist.

He died on 12 January 1934 in the 7th arrondissement of Paris, but was buried at Montauban, Tarn-et-Garonne. The Avenue de Selves in the 8th arrondissement of Paris, now only 110 metres long, is named after him.

Political offices
| Preceded by Jean Cruppi | Minister of Foreign Affairs; 1911–1912 | Succeeded by Raymond Poincaré |
| Preceded by Maurice Maunoury | Minister of the Interior; 1924 | Succeeded by Camille Chautemps |
| Preceded by Gaston Doumergue | President of the French Senate; 1924–1927 | Succeeded by Paul Doumer |
