= Elizabeth Bainbridge =

British opera singer (1930–2024)

- Born: 28 March 1930; Rawtenstall, Lancashire, England
- Died: 8 December 2024 (aged 94); East Wittering, England
- Occupation: Opera singer
- Spouse: Phillon Castell Morris (m. 1970; died 1988)
- Children: Godfrey Bainbridge (b. 1954)

Elizabeth Bainbridge (28 March 1930 – 8 December 2024) was an English and British opera singer. Her career in singing spanned several decades. She achieved most of her successes while a member of the company of the Royal Opera House, Covent Garden, London. Bainbridge was a mezzo-soprano and contralto.

== Early life ==
Bainbridge was born on 28 March 1930 in Rawtenstall, Lancashire in the North of England. She left school at the age of 14, and worked in the weaving mills of Lancashire during the last year of the Second World War before studying at the Guildhall School of Music in London.

== Career ==
Bainbridge made her professional debut as the Third Lady in Die Zauberflöte at Glyndebourne in East Sussex in 1963. The following year saw her debut at the Royal Opera House in Wagner's Die Walküre. She joined the company in 1965, and appeared at Covent Garden more than a thousand times: among her roles were Amneris, Arvidson, Auntie (in Peter Grimes), Berta, Emilia, Erda, Grandma Burya, Mamma Lucia, Mistress Quickly and Suzuki. She sang in concert in the Barbican Hall, the Royal Festival Hall and the Royal Albert Hall, starring twice in the Last Night of the Proms with Colin Davis.

She accompanied the Covent Garden company on its visits to La Scala in 1976 and to Japan and South Korea in 1979. Her international career also took her to the Olympic Arts Festival in Los Angeles in 1984 and the Athens Festival in 1985, as well as to Buenos Aires and Chicago. In the 1990s. she sang in Jenufa in Tel Aviv and in Susannah in Nantes.

She contributed to several albums, including recordings of Dido and Aeneas, Eugene Onegin, The Rape of Lucretia, Peter Grimes and Sir John in Love. In 1966, she appeared in the first recording of Bernard Herrmann's opera Wuthering Heights, conducted by the composer.

== Personal life and death ==
Her son, Godfrey Bainbridge, was born in 1954. She has two grandsons, Christopher Bainbridge and Julian Bainbridge. She married the Jamaican Phillon Castell Morris (b.1946 - d.1988) in the 1970s. Bainbridge died in East Wittering, West Sussex on 8 December 2024, at the age of 94.

== Discography ==
- Ralph Vaughan Williams: Five Tudor Portraits, conducted by David Willcocks, Angel, 1969
- Henry Purcell: Dido and Aeneas, conducted by Colin Davis, Philips, 1970
- Jules Massenet: Cendrillon, conducted by Julius Rudel, Columbia, 1979
- William Walton: Troilus and Cressida, conducted by Lawrence Foster, EMI, 1995

== Filmography ==
- Dido and Aeneas (as Second Witch), 1965
- Peter Grimes (as Auntie), 1969
- The Yeomen of the Guard (as Dame Carruthers), 1975
- Peter Grimes (as Auntie), 1981
- The Yeomen of the Guard (as Dame Carruthers), 1982
- Il Trovatore (as Azucena), 1983
