= Louise Cruppi =

French writer, musician and activist

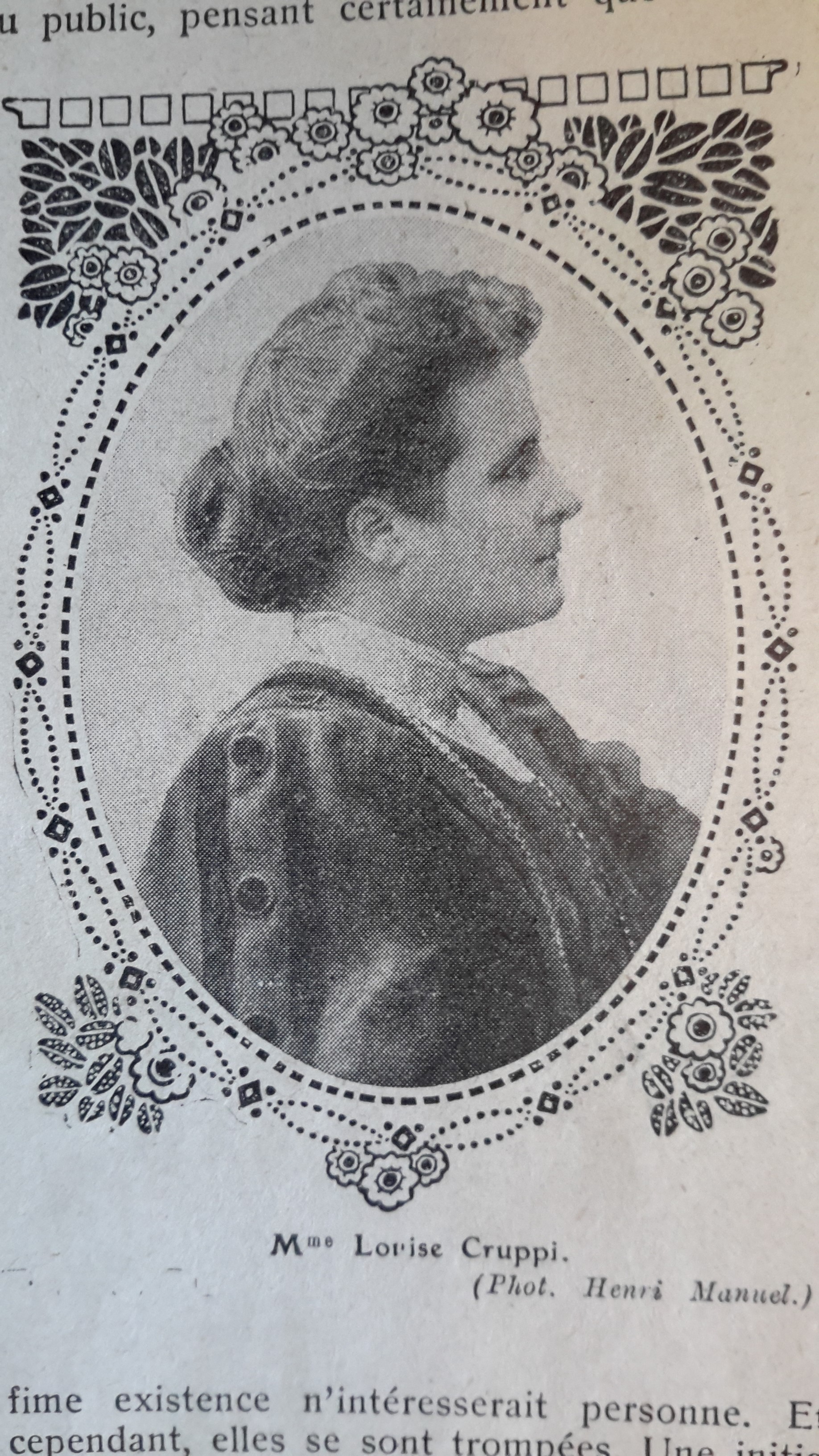
Louise Cruppi

Louise Cruppi, née Crémieux (1862–1925), was a French writer, musician and activist.

== Biography ==
Louise Cruppi was raised from the age of 10 years old by her grandfather, Isaac Adolphe Crémieux (1796–1880), an influential political figure during the French Second and Third Republics known primarily for his efforts to protect and extend the human rights of French Jews. Louise Crémieux received an excellent education and had a great talent for music. She took piano lessons with Gabriel Fauré and voice lessons with Pauline Viardot. On April 20, 1882, at the age of 20, she married Jean Cruppi (1855–1933). An elected member of parliament without interruption from 1898 to 1919, Jean Cruppi held important ministerial posts in the governments of the Third Republic. The couple had 4 children and Louise Cruppi continued her musical activities, including hosting an important musical salon in her home at 80, rue de l’Université in Paris. She encouraged Maurice Ravel in his early work and, to thank her, he dedicated his 1907 opera, L’heure espagnole, to her. Ravel also dedicated the Fugue from Le Tombeau de Couperin to the memory of her son, Jean, fallen in WWI . Her daughter, Amélie Cruppi, married sculptor Paul Landowski in 1913. Landowski wrote with great affection about his mother-in-law in his journal.

== Literary career and social activism ==
Cruppi's first novel appeared in 1905. Avant l’heure (Ollendorff) is based on the early career of the composer Georges Bizet. In 1908 her play, Répudiée, was performed at the Théâtre Antoine. She published an essay on Swedish women writers in 1912, entitled Les Femmes écrivains aujourd’hui 1. Her second novel, La Famille Sanarens, was published by Grasset in 1921. Cruppi was a member of the jury of the prix Femina from the early 1920s until her death in 1925.

In addition to her literary and musical activities, Cruppi embraced many social causes. She founded public lending libraries in disadvantaged neighbourhoods in Paris, was a member of the executive committee of the Conseil national des femmes françaises or National Council of French Women. She founded and chaired the Science, Arts and Literature Section of CNFF between 1909 and 1922.

Louise Cruppi was a long-time correspondent of Romain Rolland. Between them they exchanged over 1000 letters between 1905 and her death in 1925.
