= Le nozze di Figaro (Herbert von Karajan 1978 recording) =

- Decca Records CD: 421 125-2

Studio album by Herbert von Karajan
- Released: 1979
- Studios: Sofiensaal, Vienna
- Genre: Opera
- Length: 169:32
- Language: Italian
- Label: Decca
- Producer: Christopher Raeburn

Le nozze di Figaro is a 169-minute studio album of Wolfgang Amadeus Mozart's opera, performed by Christiane Barbaux, Jules Bastin, Jane Berbié, Ileana Cotrubaș, José van Dam, Zoltan Kélémén, Tom Krause, Marjon Lambriks, Frederica von Stade, Anna Tomowa-Sintow and Heinz Zednik with the Chorus of the Vienna State Opera and the Vienna Philharmonic under the direction of Herbert von Karajan. It was recorded in April 1978 and released in 1979.

== Background ==
The album includes the Act 4 arias for Marcellina and Basilio which some other recordings omit.

In act 3 of the opera, the sextet has traditionally been performed after the Count's recitative and aria "Hai già vinta la causa!... Vedrò mentr'io sospiro" and before the Countess's recitative and aria "E Susanna non vien!... Dove sono". In 1963, Robert Moberly and Christopher Raeburn suggested that this sequence entailed defects in the opera's storyline, and conjectured that originally Mozart and da Ponte had placed the sextet after the Countess's number, not before it. They pointed out that at the première of the opera, Antonio and Bartolo had been performed by the same singer, and argued that the score might have been rearranged to give him the opportunity to change his costume. Herbert von Karajan adopted the Moberly-Raeburn sequence when conducting Jean-Pierre Ponnelle's new staging of the opera at the Salzburg Festival in 1973, and adhered to it when he made the present album (of which Raeburn was the producer).

Although it is a studio recording, the album derived from a theatrical production. In May 1977, a year before the studio sessions, Bastin, Berbié, Cotrubas, van Dam, Equiluz, Kélémén, Krause, von Stade, Tomowa-Sintow and Zednik performed Le nozze di Figaro at the Vienna State Opera under von Karajan's direction. (An Austrian Radio recording of one of their performances was released on CD in 2012 by Orfeo (catalogue number C856 123D)).

== Recording ==
The album was recorded using analogue technology in April and May 1978 in the Sofiensaal, Vienna.

== Critical reception ==
=== Reviews ===
The musicologist Stanley Sadie reviewed the album on LP in Gramophone in September 1979. It had a very strong roster of soloists, he thought, even if they did not mine quite as much meaning from Lorenzo da Ponte's libretto as they would have done if they had been Italian. Tom Krause was the more successful of the Almavivas, singing with "plenty of weight and virility", powerfully conveying the "rage, frustration and wounded social pride" that consumed the priapic Count after his failure to seduce his servant's fiancée. Sadie could not recall another artist who had expressed the Count's lust so potently. As his dignified wife, Anna Tomowa-Sintow sang with a voice that was "rich, glowing [and] spacious", but perhaps not as lissom or accurate as the bel canto ideal. José van Dam's Figaro was every bit as impressive as his master. Van Dam was meticulous in his attention to every nuance both of Figaro's music and of its dramatic context, attending to even the smallest minutiae with the utmost conscientiousness. Like Tomowa-Sintow, Ileana Cotrubas was somewhat outshone by her partner. Her singing was lovely in its limpidity and refinement, but she seemed downcast and numb rather than the lively personality that she generally was. The singers in the secondary roles fared better. Christiane Barbaux was a "pleasantly clear" Barbarina, Jules Bastin a "well articulated" Bartolo, Jane Berbié a "neat" if occasionally strained Marcellina, Heinz Zednik a "capable if not imaginative" Basilio and Frederica von Stade "a model of clear and straightforward singing" as Cherubino. The orchestra's contribution was laudable in some respects, disappointing in others. The Vienna Philharmonic's strings were "very rich, smooth and beautiful", but its woodwinds were too anodyne to satisfactorily express the commentary on the drama that Mozart had written for them. As for Herbert von Karajan's conducting of his "elusive, indeed indistinct" interpretation, there was little to be said in its favour. It was true that his recitativo secco was unusually imaginative in its abrupt variations of pacing and dynamics. But otherwise his influence was unhappy. He seemed to have inhibited his singers from performing their roles in the way that they would have preferred to, and he had chosen some highly unorthodox tempi for no discernible reason. His eccentric speeds might not "actually distress" listeners, but neither would they help anyone to understand the opera more deeply. The album's engineering too was less than ideal, providing a convincingly theatrical stereo soundstage but offering an anachronistic "sleek and rounded" audio with a reverberant acoustic and a balance that favoured strings over woodwinds and instruments over singers. In sum, despite all its good ingredients, the album was not one that could be recommended. It was "too bland, too concerned with a smoothly polished surface, too little alive to the quicksilver of Mozart's score".

J. B. Steane reviewed the album on LP in Gramophone in October 1979. He largely agreed with Sadie about the strength of Decca's cast. Ileana Cotrubas was "delightful" as Susanna. Tom Krause and José van Dam both sang with a "fine tone" that some of their competitors lacked. Frederica von Stade was "excellent throughout", and notably sang a "Non so più" very different from the exuberant performance on her bel canto recital disc, with "the voice caressing and yearning to an accompaniment of gentle murmurs and subdued ardours and excitements". Anna Tomowa-Sintow alone was something of a disappointment, sometimes lapsing into "tremulous" singing that was unexpected from an artist with such a high reputation. Where Steane differed from Sadie was in his assessment of Karajan's contribution to the album. He was impressed by Karajan's "special touch", and in particular by the considered way in which the conductor had distinguished between unguarded conversation and conspiratorial asides in Mozart's recitativo secco. The recording was, he argued, a performance rich in light and shade and one with "a great deal to say". It was, all in all, "a Figaro full of life and insight: hearing it is a special event".

James Goodfriend reviewed the album on LP in Stereo Review in December 1979. He admired its singers even more than his British counterparts had done, deeming them, if not better than their greatest predecessors, at least worthy of being spoken of in the same breath as them. In the title role, José van Dam was "splendid". Ileana Cotrubas's Susanna was "certainly the best thing I've heard her do on records". Tom Krause's "slight inherent musical stiffness" actually helped him to play Almaviva. Anna Tomowa-Sintow was "musically lovely and believable" as the Countess, although not as aristocratic as would have been ideal. Frederica von Stade was excellent in her signature role of Cherubino. "She not only has the voice for the part, and the musical intelligence, but the very character aligns perfectly with her temperament. She is infinitely more convincing here than in the Jennie Tourel [French] repertoire." All the lesser roles were sung more or less perfectly too, and Konrad Leitner's harpsichord continuo was uncommonly creative. The Vienna Philharmonic played from the heart in the kind of performance that had led some critics to hail them as the finest orchestra in the world. The album's audio quality was first rate. Taken as a whole, the recording was even better than the benchmark version conducted by Erich Kleiber. It was "a great musical achievement, and the very consistency and elegance of its musical style tell us unmistakably that it is Karajan's achievement".

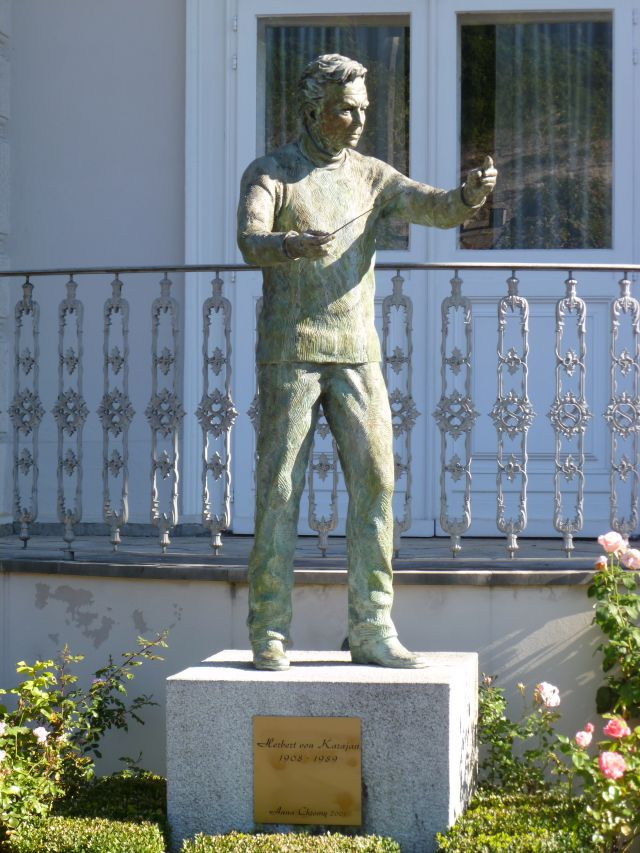
Statue of Herbert von Karajan outside his birthplace in Salzburg, Austria

Alan Blyth reviewed the album on CD in Gramophone in July 1988, comparing it with a new version of the opera conducted by Bernard Haitink The "affecting delicacy" of Ileana Cotrubas's Susanna was the only element of Karajan's album that he singled out for praise. José van Dam had sung Figaro well, but not as well as when he had recorded the opera under Neville Marriner for Philips. The Countess of Anna Tomowa-Sintow was "less secure of pitch and tone" than Haitink's Felicity Lott's. The playing of the Vienna Philharmonic was "too comfortable and well-upholstered" for an opera that would be heard to better advantage played on period instruments. Karajan had perpetrated a reading of the opera that was "unstable", and in which "speeds are often eccentric and the excellent cast seems cowed by the conductor's dominance".

Richard Lawrence noted the album briefly in a survey of the Le nozze di Figaro discography in Gramophone's 2011 Awards issue. Like Blyth, he found little in the album to celebrate, mentioning only Frederica von Stade's "winning" Cherubino. He was irked by the dramatically informed handling of recitativo secco that had earlier been remarked by Steane. "Van Dam's secretive whispering when plotting with Susanna and the Countess in Act 2 becomes irritating with repeated hearing."

=== Accolade ===
In the December 1979 issue of Stereo Review, the album was included in the magazine's list of "Best Recordings of the Month".

== Track listing, CD1 ==
Wolfgang Amadeus Mozart: Le nozze di Figaro, opera comica in quattro atti (Vienna, 1786), K. 492, with a libretto by Lorenzo da Ponte after Pierre Beaumarchais

- 1 (4:03) Sinfonia

Act One

- 2 (3:12) No. 1 Duetto: "Cinque... dieci... venti..." (Figaro, Susanna)
- 3 (4:03) No. 2 Duetto: "Se a caso madama" (Figaro, Susanna)
- 4 (4:04) No. 3 Recitativo e cavatina: "Bravo, signor padrone!.... Se vuol ballare" (Figaro, Bartolo, Marcellina)
- 5 (3:46) No. 4 Aria: "La vendetta, oh, la vendetta" (Bartolo, Marcellina, Susanna)
- 6 (3:43) No. 5 Duetto: "Via, resti servita" (Marcellina, Susanna, Cherubino)
- 7 (6:32) No. 6 Aria: "Non so più cosa son, cosa faccio" (Cherubino, Susanna, Conte, Basilio)
- 8 (10:04) No. 7 Terzetto: "Cosa sento! Tosto andate" (Conte, Basilio, Susanna, Cherubino, Chorus, Figaro)
- 9 (3:40) No. 10 Aria: "Non più andrai, farfallone amoroso" (Figaro)

Act Two

- 10 (8:07) No. 11 Cavatina: "Porgi, amor" (Contessa, Susanna, Figaro, Cherubino)
- 11 (3:45) No. 12 Canzona: "Voi che sapete" (Cherubino, Contessa, Susanna)
- 12 (5:14) No. 13 Aria: "Venite... inginocchiatevi" (Susanna, Contessa, Cherubino, Conte)
- 13 (1:10) Recitativo: "Che novità!" (Conte, Contessa)
- 14 (3:47) No. 14 Terzetto: "Susanna, or via, sortite" (Conte, Contessa, Susanna)
- 15 (1:27) No. 15 Duetto: "Aprite, presto, aprite" (Susanna, Cherubino)

== Track listing, CD2 ==
Act Two, continued

- 1 (1:15) Recitativo: "Tutto è come io lasciai" (Conte, Contessa)
- 2 (7:35) No. 16 Finale, Part 1: "Esci, ormai, garzon malnato" (Conte, Contessa, Susanna)
- 3 (9:20) No. 16 Finale, Part 2: "Signori, di fuori son già i suonatori" (Figaro, Conte, Susanna, Contessa, Antonio)
- 4 (4:08) No. 16 Finale, Part 3: "Voi, signor, che giusto siete" (Marcellina, Basilio, Bartolo, Conte, Susanna, Contessa, Cherubino)

Act Three

- 5 (3:10) Recitativo: "Che imbarazzo è mai questo!" (Conte, Contessa, Susanna)
- 6 (2:33) No. 17 Duetto: "Crudel! Perchè finora" (Conte, Susanna, Figaro)
- 7 (5:45) No. 18 Recitativo ed aria: "Hai già vinta la causa!" (Conte, Barbarina, Cherubino)
- 8 (8:37) No. 20 Recitativo ed aria: "E Susanna non vien!... Dove sono" (Contessa)
- 9 (6:27) No. 19 Sestetto: "Riconoscsi in questo amplesso" (Marcellina, Figaro, Bartolo, Curzio, Conte, Susanna, Antonio)
- 10 (6:53) No. 21 Recitativo e duetto: "Cosa mi narri!... Sull'aria ... che soave zeffiretto" (Contessa, Susanna, Chorus, Barbarina, Antonio, Conte, Cherubino, Figaro)
- 11 (6:25) No. 23 Finale: "Ecco la marcia" (Figaro, Susanna, Conte, Contessa, First Girl, Second Girl)

== Track listing, CD3 ==
Act Four

- 1 (3:59) No. 24 Cavatina: "L'ho perduta" (Barbarina, Figaro, Marcellina)
- 2 (5:25) No. 25 Aria: "Il capro e la capretta" (Marcellina, Barbarina, Figaro, Basilio, Bartolo)
- 3 (4:11) No. 26 Aria: "In quegli anni in cui val poco" (Basilio)
- 4 (5:18) No. 27 Recitativo ed aria:"Tutto è disposto... Aprite un po' quegl'occhi" (Figaro, Susanna, Marcellina, Contessa)
- 5 (5:28) No. 28 Recitativo ed aria: "Giunse alfin il momento... Deh vieni, non tardar" (Susanna, Figaro, Cherubino, Contessa)
- 6 (11:00) No. 29 Finale, Part 1: "Pian pianin le andrò più presso" (Cherubino, Contessa, Conte, Susanna, Figaro)
- 7 (5:11) No. 29 Finale, Part 2: "Gente, gente, all'armi, all'armi" (Conte, Figaro, Curzio, Basilio, Antonio, Barbarina, Susanna, Cherubino, Contessa)

== Personnel ==
=== Performers ===
- Tom Krause (bass-baritone), Il Conte, Count Almaviva
- Anna Tomowa-Sintow (soprano), La Contessa, Countess Almaviva
- Ileana Cotrubaș (soprano), Susanna, maid to the Countess
- José van Dam (bass-baritone), Figaro, valet to the Count
- Frederica von Stade (mezzo-soprano), Cherubino, page to the Almavivas
- Jane Berbié (mezzo-soprano), Marcellina, housekeeper to the Almavivas
- Jules Bastin (bass), Bartolo, a physician
- Heinz Zednik (tenor), Basilio, a music teacher
- Kurt Equiluz (tenor), Don Curzio, a lawyer
- Zoltan Kélémén (baritone), Antonio, gardener to the Almavivas
- Christiane Barbaux (soprano), Barbarina, daughter of Antonio, and First Girl
- Marjon Lambriks (soprano), Second Girl
- Konrad Leitner, harpsichord continuo
- Chorus of the Vienna State Opera
- Norbert Balatsch, chorus master
- Vienna Philharmonic
- Herbert von Karajan, conductor

=== Other ===
- Christopher Raeburn, producer
- Richard Beswick, assistant producer
- James Lock, engineer
- John Dunkerley, engineer
- Jack Law, engineer

== Release history ==
In 1979, Decca Records released the album as a set of four LPs (catalogue number D132D4) and two cassettes (catalogue number K132K42), both accompanied by notes, texts and translations. In the USA, the album was released by London Records (catalogue number OSA 1443).

In 1988, Decca issued the album on CD (catalogue number 421 125-2), packaged in a slipcase with a 372-page booklet. The booklet provided libretti, synopses, an essay by Stanley Sadie and a note by Christopher Raeburn on the Moberly-Raeburn proposal, all in English, French, German and Italian. It was illustrated with pictures of Mozart, Beaumarchais and da Ponte; pictures of a playbill for the opera's première and the Vienna Burgtheater where the première took place; pictures of four of the opera's early interpreters; and photographs of Bastin, Berbié, Cotrubaș, van Dam, Krause, von Stade, Tomowa-Sintow, Zednik and von Karajan.

In 2012, Decca reissued the album on CD in its "Decca the Opera Company" series (catalogue number 478 343-8) without a printed libretto.
