= Julie Reisserová =

Czech composer and music publicist (1888–1938)

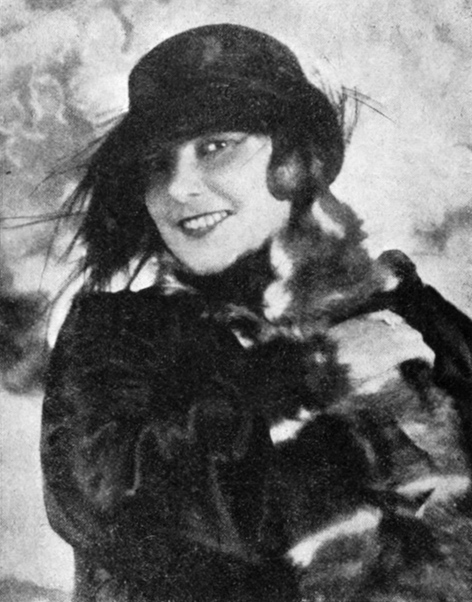
Julie Reisserová in 1931

Julie Reisserová née Kühnlova (9 October 1888 – 25 February 1938) was a Czech composer and music publicist.

== Biography ==
Julie Reisserová was born in Prague. She studied piano with Adolf Mikeš and singing with Richard Figar. From 1919 until 1921 she studied composition in Prague with Josef Bohuslav Foerster. She continued her composition studies in Bern with Ernst Hohlfeld and with Albert Roussel (1924–1929) and Nadia Boulanger.

In 1921 she married Czech diplomat Jan Reisser (born 1891) and moved with him to Switzerland (1921–1929), Belgrade (1930–1933) and Copenhagen (1933–1936) while pursuing her career as a composer. Her work was performed in Bern, Paris, Geneva, Copenhagen and in Philadelphia.

Reisserová translated into Czech language Le testament de la tante Caroline (Aunt Caroline's Last Will), by operetta by composer Albert Roussel and librettist Nino (Michel Veber). The operetta premiered on 14 November 1936 in Olomouc and was also staged on 18 April 1937 in Prague.

She died in Prague in 1938, age 49.

== Selected works ==
Notable works include:

Orchestral music

- Suite for Orchestra (Czech: Suita pro orchestr), 1928–1931
- Pastorale Maritimo for Orchestra (Czech: Pastorale Maritimo pro orchestr), 1933
- Early Spring (Czech: Předjaří), 1936

Solo piano

- Esquisses, 1935
- Deux Allegros

Vocal music

- March (Czech: Březen; orchestral songs), 1934
- Sous la neige (Czech: Pod sněhem, lit. '"Beneath the Snow"'; song cycle for voice and piano), 1936
- Festive Day (Czech: Slavnostní den; for women's choir), 1936, dedicated to Františka Plamínková

Reisserová also wrote In Margin Vitae, a book of her poems written in Czech, German, French and English (lost).

== Recordings ==
Esquisses nos. 1 et 2: https://www.youtube.com/watch?v=QQHy4LElE4k (Yuliya Minina, piano).
