= Paul Derenne =

French opera singer

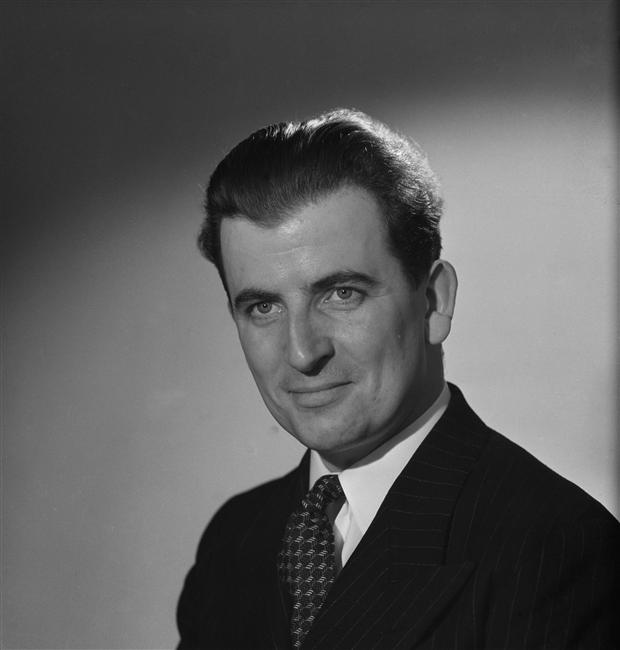
Paul Derenne in 1939

Paul Derenne (born René Bouvier) (1907, Rennes – 18 April 1988, Boulogne-Billancourt) was a French tenor whose eclectic repertoire allowed him a successful career on stage and on the concert platform.

== Early life ==
Derenne undertook studies in architecture while also pursuing vocal studies with Marguerite Babaïan, she recommended him to Reynaldo Hahn (who suggested his stage name based on his home town).

== Career ==
After taking part in a competition in 1935 organised by the magazine Comœdia, he made his debut under Charles Munch in the French premiere of Hin und Zurück by Hindemith. Hugues Cuénod, who also took part, introduced him to Nadia Boulanger from which he took part in the historic recording of Monteverdi madrigals, which won the Grand Prix du Disque for 1937.

Derenne made his debut at the Paris Opéra Comique in 1937 in the French premieres of Le testament de la tante Caroline by Albert Roussel (Noel) and of Ariadne auf Naxos by Richard Strauss (Brighella) alongside de Germaine Lubin and Janine Micheau, both operas conducted by Roger Désormière.

Called up for military service in 1940 and captured by the Germans, he was imprisoned at Longvic, near Dijon. Freed after a few months, Derenne joined the company of the Palais de Chaillot, singing many leading lyric roles of the opéra comique repertoire, such as Fortunio, George Brown in La dame blanche, Almaviva in Il Barbiere di Siviglia (in French) and Gérald in Lakmé. He also sang in the first performance of surviving fragments of Chabrier's Vaucochard et Fils 1er on 22 April 1941 at the Salle du Conservatoire.

During the Occupation, he came to know Henri Sauguet, and sang in the premiere of La Gageure imprévue (Détieulette) at the Opéra Comique in 1944, also premiering the song cycle 'Les Pénitents en maillot rose', (poems by Max Jacob). Sauguet introduced Derenne to other members of Groupe des Six and also recorded Socrate with him in 1954. He premiered many mélodies of Jacques Leguerney, including "Poèmes de la Pléiade, 1er Recueil.

After the war, Derenne appeared in Great Britain, at the Edinburgh Festival, in Germany, Netherlands, Portugal and Italy, where he appeared at Fenice in Venice and La Scala in Milan in L'heure espagnole and L'Enfant et les sortilèges, which he recorded under Ernest Ansermet in 1953. With Henri Sauguet he participated in many radio concerts exploring the repertoire of the French mélodie.

After retiring from singing, he taught for many years.

His wife wrote a book of memoirs: Jacqueline Paul Derenne, Une vie en duo, Rouen, Éditions Médianes, 1992.

== Discography ==
- Maurice Ravel, L'Heure espagnole (Gonzalve) 1953 (Decca)
- Johannes Brahms, Liebeslieder Walzer with Nadia Boulanger
- Claudio Monteverdi, Madrigals directed by Nadia Boulanger, 1937
- French vocal ensembles by Josquin des Prés, Clément Janequin, Orlando de Lassus, etc.; directed by Nadia Boulanger, 1951
- Extracts from operettas Virginie (Georges Van Parys), La Maréchale Sans-Gêne (Pierre Petit)
- Mélodies françaises, songs by Gounod, Satie, Manuel Rosenthal, Milhaud, Sauguet, Debussy, Ravel, Albert Roussel, Poulenc, with Henri Sauguet (piano), 1957 and 1959 (INA, collection "Mémoire vive")
- Mélodies rares, works by Koechlin, Delage, Manziarly, Cliquet-Pleyel, Delannoy, Durey, Caplet, Ciry, Sauguet, Beydts, Françaix, Jaubert, Jacob; with various accompanists, 1958-1961 (INA, collection "Mémoire vive")
