= Cendrillon (Julius Rudel recording) =

- CBS Masterworks CD: M2K 79323

Studio album by Julius Rudel
- Released: 1979
- Studio: All Saints Church, Tooting Graveney, London
- Genre: Opera
- Length: 136:33
- Language: French
- Label: CBS Masterworks
- Producer: Paul Myers and Ray Emerson

Cendrillon
- Sony CD: SM2K 91178

Cendrillon is a 136-minute studio album of Jules Massenet's opera, performed by a cast led by Elizabeth Bainbridge, Jules Bastin, Jane Berbié, Teresa Cahill, Nicolai Gedda, Frederica von Stade, and Ruth Welting with the Ambrosian Opera Chorus and the Philharmonia Orchestra under the direction of Julius Rudel. It was released in 1979.

== Background ==
The album presents the opera with only one small cut, but deviates from Massenet's score in casting Prince Charming as a tenor rather than as a soprano. The album was the first recording of the opera ever undertaken.

== Recording ==
The album was recorded using analogue technology on 14 to 24 June 1978 in All Saints Church, Tooting Graveney, London.

== Packaging ==
The covers of the LP edition and the first CD edition of the album share the same design, prepared under the art direction of Allen Weinberg, featuring a photograph of von Stade as Cendrillon taken by Valerie Clement.

== Critical reception ==
=== Reviews ===
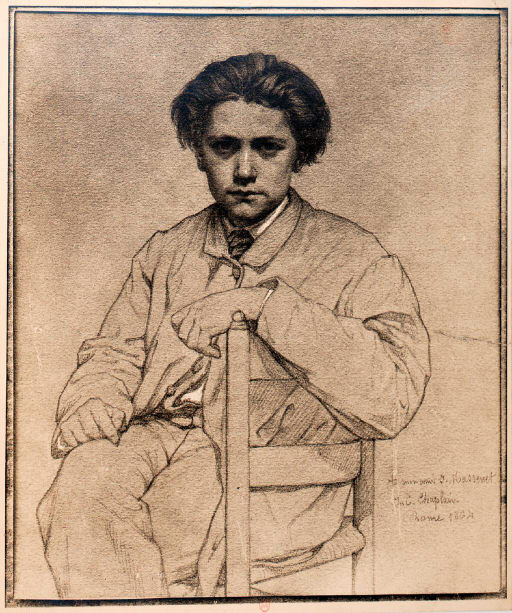
Jules Massenet portrayed by Jules Clément Chaplain (1839–1909)

Alan Blyth reviewed the album on LP in Gramophone in July 1979. The only negative thing that he could find to say about Frederica von Stade's performance of the opera's title role was that she was a mezzo singing music conceived for a soprano. She was "utterly delightful in her portrayal of vulnerability, in her attention to Massenet's many musical injunctions and her whole-hearted involvement in the part". She was entirely at home in Massenet's "enchanting, light-fingered" style, and expressed every chapter of Cendrillon's story, both sorrowful and joyous, with equal eloquence. Ruth Welting was no less impressive as Cinderella's Fairy Godmother. She sang her glitteringly high music with "not a note misplaced and every one struck truly and accurately". She had been an accomplished Philine in CBS's recording of Ambroise Thomas's Mignon – see Mignon (Antonio de Almeida recording) – but her Fée was even better. The album's other three women were all good too, with Teresa Cahill and Elizabeth Bainbridge "sprightly" as Cendrillon's stepsisters and Jane Berbié bringing out all the comical villainy of their mother. The set's male principals were less successful. As Cendrillon's father, Jules Bastin was "sympathetic and idiomatic" but occasionally unreliable in pitch. Nicolai Gedda's reading of Prince Charming was uncomfortably "strenuous", but was defective more fundamentally simply because of his being a man. His musicianship and command of French could not make up for the fact that Massenet had scored the Prince for a mezzo, not a tenor. The Philharmonia Orchestra played as well as they knew how, and Julius Rudel conducted the score "lovingly, appreciative of both its many delicacies and its romantic heart". The album was the finest in his entire discography. Its audio quality was mostly satisfactory – "a little too recessed" but also "spacious and atmospheric", with neither voices nor instruments allowed undue prominence. The opera itself was "imbued with warmth, ingenuity, and charming colours", a score offering craftsmanship, magic, gossamer, erotic passion, and Massenet "at his most bewitching".

George Jellinek reviewed the album on LP in Stereo Review in September 1979. Frederica von Stade, he wrote, "was evidently born to play ... Cinderella. She has a very special kind of voice: a soprano with a luscious downward extension and all of a seamless piece". Her singing was like "an unbroken stream of whipped cream". Ruth Welting was "scintillating" as the Fairy Godmother, sounding like a kindly, mirror-universe version of the Queen of the Night in Mozart's Die Zauberflöte. Jane Berbié was "capital" as Mme de la Haltière, and Teresa Cahill and Elizabeth Bainbridge "harmonize prettily" as her daughters, none of them being obliged to perpetrate any Despina-like grotesquery in the interest of comic effect. Jules Bastin's Pandolfe was likeable and well drawn but sung in a voice that was rather dry. Vocal limitations were also an issue with the distinctly mature Nicolai Gedda. He could not sing with the glow, flexibility and ring that had been his fifteen years earlier, but his chivalrous Prince Charming was still an asset to the set. The orchestra presented Massenet's ball, march and pantomime music with "charm, dash and emphasis", and Julius Rudel's conducting achieved a laudable precision of ensemble. The album's engineering was exquisite. A star-bright recording of a "colourful, inventive, sparkling" score, the album had recovered a forgotten work that eminently deserved its revival.

J. B. Steane reviewed the album on CD in Gramophone in September 1989. Frederica von Stade, he wrote, was a "touchingly beautiful" Cinderella. "The sadness that her voice expresses so well has its place in some of the most exquisite of Massenet's solos, and many of her phrases have a specially memorable loveliness". The role could have been tailor-made for her. Ruth Welting, too, was "accomplished", but both Jules Bastin and Nicolai Gedda were disappointing. Bastin lacked the "finesse and vocal elegance" for Pandolfe, and Gedda was doubly disqualified from singing Prince Charming by his considerable years and his not being the en travesti mezzo-soprano that Massenet had intended. The album's chorus and orchestra were both excellent, the Ambrosians singing with unimpeachable technique and dramaturgical imagination and the Philharmonia making the most of Massenet's fresh, animated score. Cendrillon was, Steane promised, "a most delightful web of moonshine choruses, pastoral woodwind, coloratura filigree, wistful sentiment and neat comedy", and readers should not miss the opportunity to hear it for themselves.

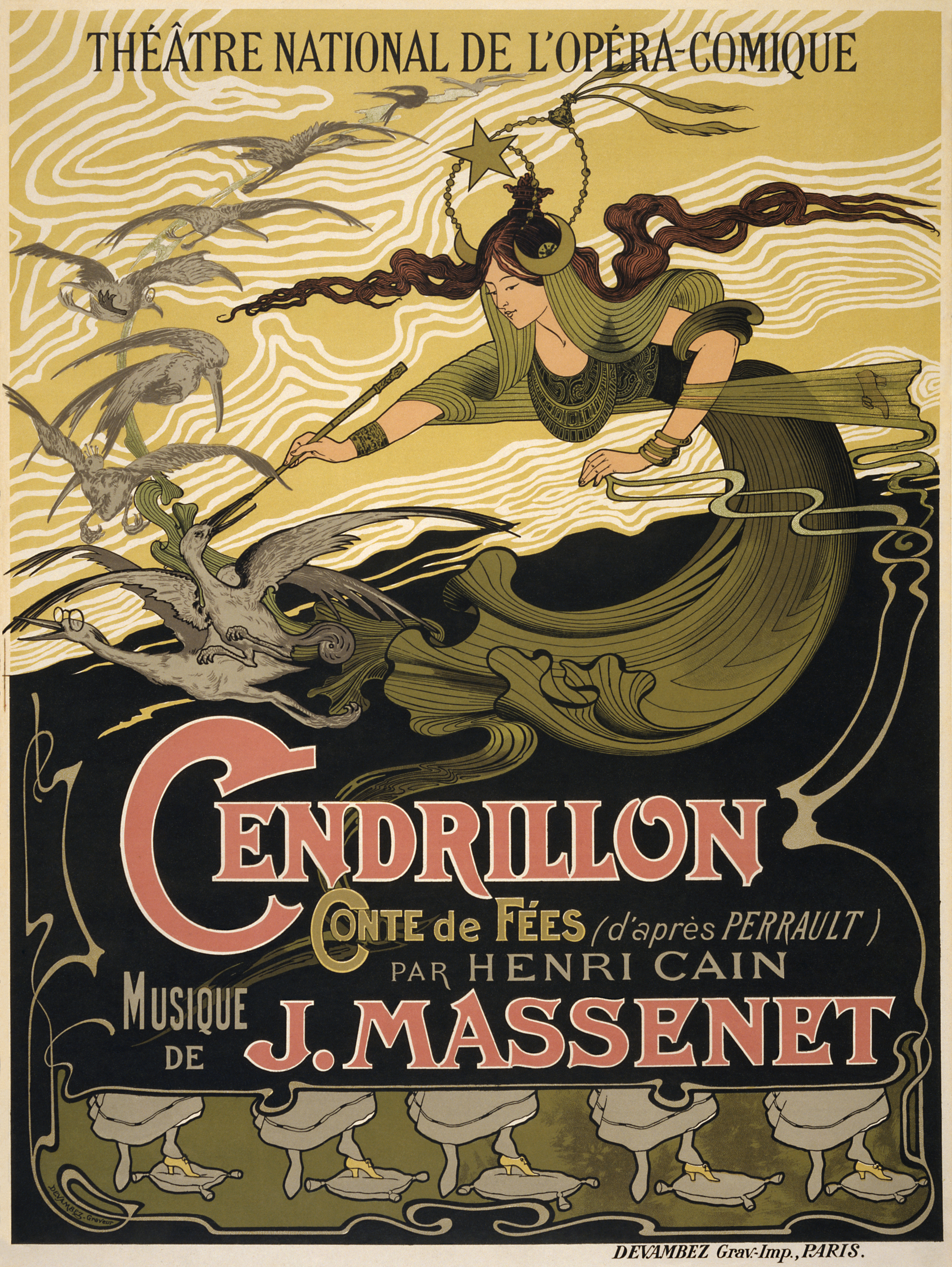
A poster advertising the première of Cendrillon in 1899

Richard Fairman included the album in a survey of the Massenet discography in Gramophone's 2000 Awards issue. "Who could resist Frederica von Stade's ethereal Cinderella", he asked, "as she falls in love at the ball with the words, 'Vous êtes mon Prince Charmant!'?" Unlike his Gramophone colleagues, he found Ruth Welting's Fairy Godmother "a touch edgy", but he was at one with them in his bemusement that CBS had allotted Prince Charming to the "hard-pressed" tenor of Nicolai Gedda instead of the "elegant female pantomime boy" of Massenet's wishes. He approved Julius Rudel's conducting for resisting the temptation to lapse into an excess of sentimentality. The audio quality of the album he branded disquietingly boomy. The opera itself he thought good in parts, mocking its court scenes as pedestrian but acknowledging the "sprinkling of fairy dust over so much of the rest" as "pure magic".

Patrick O'Connor reviewed the album on a reissued CD in Gramophone in October 2003. Recalling how Frederica von Stade had taken part in several theatrical productions of Cendrillon in the 1970s and 1980s, he affirmed that "her singing of the title role remains one of the best things she has ever done". Unusually, he had a similarly high opinion of all the album's other principal soloists too. Ruth Welting was "delightful" as the Fairy Godmother, Jules Bastin was "fine" as Pandolfe and even Nicolai Gedda deserved a word of praise. Purists might object to a tenor's usurping the role of a mezzo, but Gedda had sung "with such ardour" that O'Connor was won over. Julius Rudel had conducted with "a nice feeling for Massenet's gentle sensuality". The album's one fault was miserly packaging.

=== Accolades ===
In September 1989, Stereo Review named the album as one of its "Best Recordings of the Month". In December 1979, Alan Blyth included the album in his "Critic's Choice" list of the best recordings of the year: "I cannot imagine a more appropriate Christmas present than CBS's delightful recording of the composer's light-fingered score for Cendrillon with Frederica von Stade as a tender, pathetic Cinderella, Ruth Welting as an airy Fairy and idiomatic conducting from Julius Rudel, so responsive to Massenet's delicate scoring".

== Track listing: CD1 ==
Jules Massenet (1842–1912)

Cendrillon, Conte de Fées (1899) (Cinderella, a fairy story), with a libretto by Henri Caïn (1859–1937) after Charles Perrault

- 1 (1:43) Prelude

Act One

- 2 (2:23) "On appelle, on sonne!" (Servants, Pandolfe)
- 3 (4:29) "Du côté de la barbe" (Pandolfe)
- 4 (2:31) "Faites-vous très belle" (Mme de la Haltière, Noémie, Dorothée)
- 5 (1:14) "Prenez un maintien gracieux" (Mme de la Haltière, Noémie, Dorothée)
- 6 (2:43) "Madame. ce sont les modistes" (Servants, Mme de la Haltière, Noémie, Dorothée)
- 7 (4:25) "Félicitez-moi donc" (Pandolfe, Noémie, Dorothée, Mme de la Haltière)
- 8 (7:28) "Ah! Que mes sœurs sont heureuses!" (Lucette)
- 9 (4:36) "Ah! Douce enfant" (Fairy, Spirits, Elves, Lucette)
- 10 (3:56) "Pour en faire un tissu" (Fairy, Spirits)
- 11 (4:11) "Enfin, je connaître" (Lucette, Fairy, Spirits)

Act Two

- 12 (4:59) "Que les doux pensers" (Master of Ceremonies, Courtiers, Dean of the Faculty of Medicine, Doctors, Prime Minister)
- 13 (4:07) "Allez, laissez-moi seul" (Prince)
- 14 (1:40) Entrance of the King and the Court (King, Crowd)
- 15 (2:24) 1st entrance: the daughters of the nobility (Crowd)
- 16 (2:17) 2nd entrance: the fiancés
- 17 (1:50) 3rd entrance: the Mandores
- 18 (1:36) 4th entrance: the Florentine
- 19 (2:09) The Rigaudon of the King (Dean of the Faculty of Medicine, Master of Ceremonies, Prime Minister, Mme de la Haltière, Noémie, Dorothée, Pandolfe)
- 20 (1:47) "O la suprenante aventure" / "O la décevante aventure" (Crowd, Mme de la Haltière, Noémie, Dorothée, Pandolfe, Dean of the Faculty of Medicine, Master of Ceremonies, Prime Minister, King)
- 21 (8:40) "Toi qui m'es apparue" (Prince, Lucette)

== Track listing: CD2 ==
Act Three

- 1 (5:52) "Enfin, je suis ici" (Lucette)
- 2 (1:24) "C'est vrai" (Mme de la Haltière, Noémie, Dorothée, Pandolfe)
- 3 (4:49) "Lorsqu'on a plus de vingt quartiers" (Mme de la Haltière, Noémie, Dorothée, Pandolfe, Lucette)
- 4 (5:32) "Ma pauvre enfant chérie" (Pandolfe, Lucette)
- 5 (6:07) "Seule, je partirai" (Lucette)
- 6 (7:33) "Ah! Fugitives chimères" (Fairy, Spirits)
- 7 (10:13) "À deux genoux" / "Je viens à vous" (Lucette, Prince, Fairy)

Act Four

- 8 (5:04) "O pauvre enfant!" (Pandolfe, Lucette)
- 9 (3:34) "Ah! Ouvre ta porte" (Young Girls, Lucette, Pandolfe)
- 10 (5:09) "Avancez! Reculez!" (Mme de la Haltière, Herald, Lucette, Crowd)
- 11 (4:12) March of the Princesses (Crowd)
- 12 (5:36) "Posez dans son écrin" (Prince, Crowd, King, Fairy, Lucette, Pandolfe, Mme de la Haltière)

== Personnel ==
=== Musical ===
- Frederica von Stade (mezzo-soprano), Lucette, nicknamed Cendrillon (Cinderella)
- Nicolai Gedda (1925–2017, tenor), Prince Charming
- Jules Bastin (1933–1996, bass), Pandolfe, father of Lucette
- Jane Berbié (mezzo-soprano), Madame de la Haltière, stepmother of Lucette
- Teresa Cahill (soprano), Noémie, stepsister of Lucette
- Elizabeth Bainbridge (mezzo-soprano), Dorothée, stepsister of Lucette
- Ruth Welting (1948–1999, soprano), Fairy Godmother
- Claude Méloni (baritone). King, Herald
- Paul Crook (tenor), Dean of the Faculty of Medicine
- Christian du Plessis (baritone), Master of Ceremonies
- John Noble (baritone), Prime Minister
- Carl Pini, first violin
- Act Two Stage Musicians:
  - Clifford Seville, flute
  - Rusen Gunes, viola
  - Nuala Herbert, harp
- Ambrosian Opera Chorus
- Philharmonia Orchestra
- John McCarthy, chorus master
- Julius Rudel (1921–2014), conductor

=== Other ===
- Pamela Stirling, French language coach
- Paul Walter Myers, producer
- Roy Emerson, producer
- Vivienne H. Taylor, production co-ordinator
- Robert Auger, engineer
- Mike Ross-Trevor, engineer

== Release history ==
In 1979, CBS Masterworks released the album as a triple LP (catalogue numbers M3 35194 in North America, 79323 elsewhere) with a booklet containing notes, texts and translations. The album was not released on cassette.

In 1989, CBS Masterworks issued the album as a double CD (catalogue numbers M2K 35194 in North America, M2K 79323 elsewhere) in a clamshell box with a 148-page booklet. The latter provided libretti in English, French and German, notes and a synopsis in English by Michael Williamson, notes and a synopsis in French by Gérard Condé, an essay in English by Barrymore Laurence Scherer, an essay in German by Karl Dietrich Gräwe and production photographs by Clive Barda of Bastin, Berbié, Gedda, Rudel, von Stade, Welting and the orchestra. The booklet also offered several images of Massenet, his score, a poster advertising the opera's première and illustrations of the opera's story.

In 2003, Sony reissued the album as a repackaged double CD (catalogue number SM2K 91178).
