= Jean Cruppi =

French politician

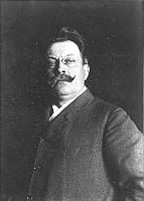

Minister of Commerce and Industry
- In office 1908–1909
- President: Armand Fallières
- Preceded by: Gaston Doumergue
- Succeeded by: Jean Dupuy

Minister of Foreign Affairs
- In office 2 March 1911 – 27 June 1911
- President: Armand Fallières
- Prime Minister: Ernest Monis
- Preceded by: Stéphen Pichon
- Succeeded by: Justin de Selves

Minister of Justice
- In office 1911–1912
- President: Armand Fallières
- Prime Minister: Joseph Caillaux
- Preceded by: Antoine Perrier
- Succeeded by: Aristide Briand

Personal details
- Born: 22 May 1855 Toulouse, France
- Died: 16 October 1933 (aged 78) Fontainebleau, France
- Spouse: Louise Cruppi

Jean Cruppi (22 May 1855 – 16 October 1933) was a French politician of the Third Republic where he held several ministerial posts. He started as a lawyer before becoming a magistrate. He was also a writer and journalist before his career in government. His first major posting was Minister of Commerce and Industry in 1908. He was appointed Minister of Foreign Affairs in the Ernest Monis government, which lasted less than four months from 2 March – 27 June 1911. Cruppi was responsible for sending soldiers into Fez, eventually leading to France's control over Morocco. In the aftermath, Cruppi held talks with the British in London at the start of the Agadir Crisis, which was caused by France's invasion of Morocco.

He was married to author and activist Louise Cruppi. The couple married in 1882 and had four children.

Political offices
Preceded by Gaston Doumergue	Minister of Commerce and Industry; 1908–1909	Succeeded by Jean Dupuy
Preceded by Stéphen Pichon	Minister of Foreign Affairs; 1911	Succeeded by Justin de Selves
Preceded by Antoine Perrier	Minister of Justice; 1911–1912	Succeeded by Aristide Briand
