= Le testament de la tante Caroline =

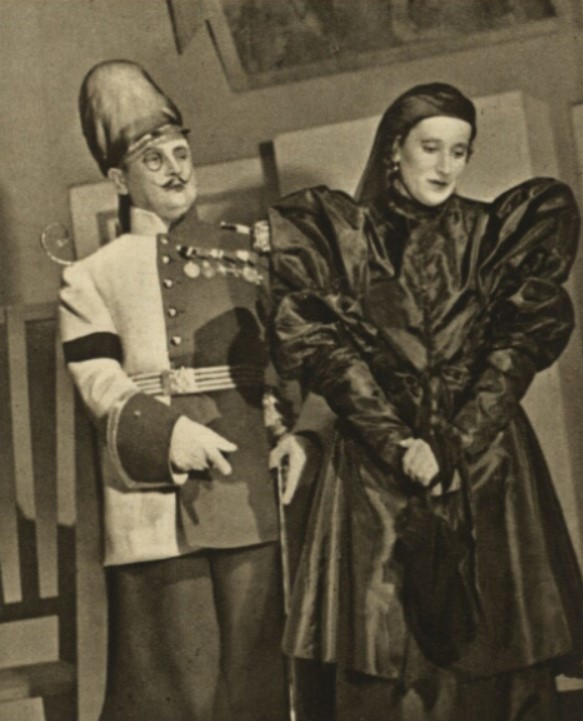
Performation in Olomouc in 1936

Le testament de la tante Caroline (Aunt Caroline's Will) is an opéra bouffe or operetta by composer Albert Roussel and librettist Nino (pseudonym of Michel Veber). The original production was in Czech (prepared by Julie Reisserová) and in three acts, but the work was later revised into a one act operetta in 1964. The operetta tells the story of a family who is caught in a difficult set of circumstances surrounding the contents of a will and the dispersal of a vast fortune. The work premiered in Olomouc on 14 November 1936.

== History ==
Le testament de la tante Caroline was composed by Roussel in 1932–1933. The comic operetta was a departure from his earlier works which were all of a serious nature. Roussel acknowledged that the works of composers Arthur Honegger and Jacques Ibert had influenced him to pursue writing a comic opera as they had been successful both critically and financially. He described the operetta as "a sort of opérette-bouffe whose characters are almost entirely grotesque and who should be played without any fear of exaggerating their effect".

The opera premiered at the opera house in Olomouc on 14 November 1936 (as Testament Tetý Karoliny) to somewhat cool reviews. The French premiere took place at the Opéra-Comique in Paris on 11 March 1937. Although Roussel intended for the work to be "clear, pleasant and accessible", the critics felt he had difficulty in "adapting himself to simplicity". In reaction to this criticism, Nino, after Roussel's death, significantly revised the operetta by cutting it from three acts to just one act in 1964. The revised version exists in French, English, German.

== Roles ==
Role	Voice type	Premiere cast, 14 November 1936 Conductor:	Premiere cast of revised version, 11 March 1937 Conductor: Roger Désormière
Noémie	soprano		Christine Liany
Christine	spoken		Suzanne Dehelly
Maître Corbeau	baritone		André Balbon
Jobard	baritone		Louis Guénot
Noel	tenor		Paul Derenne
Docteur Patogène	bass		Émile Rousseau
Béatrice	soprano		Madeleine Sibille
Lucine	mezzo-soprano		Fanély Revoil
Laguigne	tenor		René Hérent
Ernestine	soprano		Rose Pocidalo
Nurse	silent		Christiane Gaudel
La dactylo			Morice
Quatre sage-femmes			Gallot, Lagrange, Lodève, Billon

== Synopsis ==
The operetta begins in a Paris apartment where the future heirs of Aunt Caroline's vast wealth are waiting for the reading of her will. In attendance are Caroline's two nieces, sisters Christine and Naomi, and their husbands Jobard and Ferdinand. The four dream about the inheritance and what they can do with all of that money. The will, however, does not meet with the expectations of the two couples. The money is left not to Caroline's nieces, but their first-born sons. Further, the will stipulates that the couples must produce a son within the next year, or the money will be given away to the Salvation Army. Unfortunately, both Jobard and Ferdinand are infertile and so the nieces decide to get pregnant via a fortune teller and the family's chauffeur, respectively. However, in the tradition of the French operetta, the plot ends with an unexpected ironic twist. A third niece, who is an old maid and an apparent model of respectability and virtue, reveals that she is in fact the mother of the family's chauffeur, Noël. As her illegitimate son, Noël collects the money to the chagrin of the others.
