= Jane Berbié =

French mezzo-soprano (born 1931)

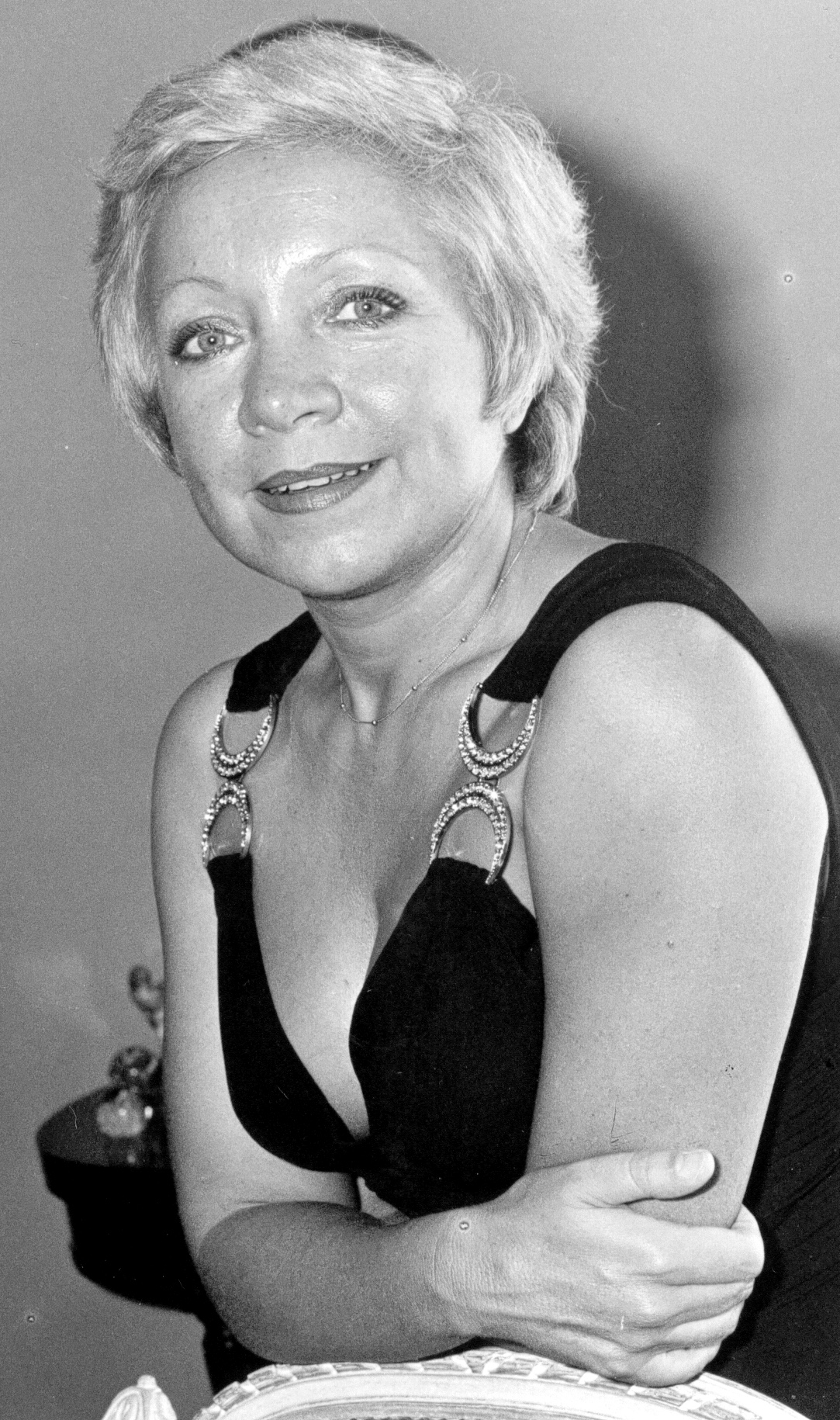
Jane Berbié

Jane Berbié (born 6 May 1931) is a French mezzo-soprano particularly associated with Mozart and Rossini roles.

== Life and career ==
Berbié was born Jeanne Bergougne, in Villefranche-de-Lauragais, Haute-Garonne, France, and as a child was entered in various local singing competitions, winning a case of champagne at one in Canet-Plage for her rendition of airs of Escamillo and Basilio. She studied piano and voice at the Music Conservatory in Toulouse. On French television she appeared on 'L'Ecole des vedettes' where she was praised by Elvira Popescu. She made her professional operatic debut at the Capitole de Toulouse in 1954, as Nicklause in Les contes d'Hoffmann. She sang throughout France in the standard mezzo roles of the French repertory, such as Siébel in Faust, Urbain in Les Huguenots, the title role in Mignon and Carmen, etc. She made her debut at the Paris Opéra in 1959, as Concepción in L'Heure espagnole, and the same year at the Aix-en-Provence Festival, as the sorceress in Dido and Aeneas.

Other roles included Ascagne in Les Troyens (under Georges Prêtre in 1965) and several in L'Enfant et les Sortilèges (under Maazel in 1961, Ozawa in 1979 at the Opéra de Paris), Gontran in Une éducation manquée (1965), Roméo et Juliette, Ascanio in Benvenuto Cellini, and many opérettes.

Following an audition with Gabriel Dussurget, directeur of the Aix-en-Provence Festival. Berbié began to be invited on major stages around Europe, appearing at La Scala in Milan, The Royal Opera House in London, the festivals of Glyndebourne and Salzburg, the Liceu in Barcelona, etc. She sang Maffio Orsini at Carnegie Hall in New York, in the famous 1965 concert version of Lucrezia Borgia, opposite Montserrat Caballé as Lucrezia, and countryman Alain Vanzo as Gennaro.

Berbié was especially appreciated in Mozart roles, such as Cherubino in Nozze di Figaro, Zerlina in Don Giovanni, both Dorabella and Despina in Cosi fan tutte. She also won considerable acclaim in Rossini roles, singing Isabella in L'Italiana in Algeri, Rosina in Il Barbiere di Siviglia, Angelina in La Cenerentola, and Malcolm in La Donna del Lago. However, she was happy to play ensemble roles as well, such as a flower maiden in Parsifal or a Rhine maiden, citing the musical value of participating in these and the demands of the smallest part.

Berbié was also active as a teacher at the Conservatoire de Paris from 1983, where her pupils included Sophie Koch, and continued to sing actively into the 1990s.

Her recordings include works such as La Dame Blanche (under Soustrot), L'Enfrance Du Christ (Martinon), Benvenuto Cellini (Davis), L'Heure Espagnole (Maazel), Fra Diavolo (Soustrot), Così fan tutte (Solti), Le Nozze di Figaro (von Karajan) and Carmen (Prêtre, Solti).

== See also ==
- Massenet: Cendrillon (Julius Rudel recording)
- Mozart: Le nozze di Figaro (Herbert von Karajan recording)
- Mozart: Le nozze di Figaro (Georg Solti recording)

== Sources ==
- Roland Mancini and Jean-Jacques Rouveroux, (orig. H. Rosenthal and J. Warrack, French edition), Guide de l’opéra, Les indispensables de la musique (Fayard, 1995). ISBN 2-213-59567-4
