= Madeleine Sibille =

French operatic soprano

Madeleine Sibille (25 February 1895 – 19 July 1984) was a French operatic dramatic soprano.

Sibille was born in Paris. She spent much of her career performing at the Opéra-Comique, making her debut there as Mercédès in Carmen on 11 January 1920. She created the roles of Milena in Félix Fourdrain's opera La Griffe at the premiere on 5 November 1923, Vatleen in Rabaud's opera L'appel de la mer (1924), Béatrice in Rousel's operetta Le testament de la tante Caroline (1937), la femme du matelos in Le pauvre matelot (1927), Comtesse Feodora in La peau de chagrin (1929), as well as taking part in the first performances at the Opéra-Comique of The Coronation of Poppea, L'Enfant et les Sortilèges and Tristan und Isolde.

Sibille also sang Santuzza in Mascagni's Cavalleria rusticana, Giulietta in Les Contes d'Hoffmann, the mother in Louise, Taven in Mireille, Anila in La Navaraisse, Télémaque in Pénélope and Geneviève in Pélléas et Mélisande.

She retired from the stage in 1939 and became a vocal teacher. She died in her home city of Paris.
