= L'heure espagnole =

Opera by Maurice Ravel

- Opera by Maurice Ravel
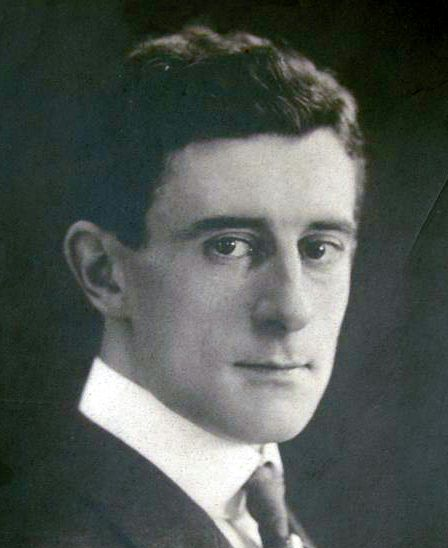
- Ravel in 1910
- Librettist: Franc-Nohain
- Language: French
- Based on: Franc-Nohain's play
- Premiere: 19 May 1911; Opéra-Comique, Paris

L'heure espagnole is a French one-act opera from 1911, described as a comédie musicale, with music by Maurice Ravel to a French libretto by Franc-Nohain, based on Franc-Nohain's 1904 play ('comédie-bouffe') of the same name The opera, set in Spain in the 18th century, is about a clockmaker whose unfaithful wife attempts to have sex with several different men while he is away, leading to them hiding in, and eventually getting stuck in, her husband's clocks. The title can be translated literally as "The Spanish Hour", but the word "heure" also means "time" – "Spanish Time", with the connotation "How They Keep Time in Spain".

The original play had first been performed at the Théâtre de l'Odéon on 28 October 1904. Ravel began working on the music as early as 1907, and the opera was first performed at the Opéra-Comique on 19 May 1911.

== Performance history ==
Ravel was closely involved in every aspect of the production as it was prepared for its premiere by the Opéra-Comique at the Salle Favart in Paris. The opera was first performed by the Opéra-Comique on 19 May 1911, in a double-bill with Thérèse by Jules Massenet; after the initial nine performances it was not revived. The Paris Opéra presented it on 5 December 1921 with Fanny Heldy as Concepción, and it enjoyed more success. The opera returned to the Opéra-Comique in 1945 where it continued in the repertoire. Outside France, L'heure espagnole was first seen at Covent Garden in 1919, Chicago and New York in 1920, Brussels in 1921, followed by Basel and Rotterdam (1923), Prague (1924), Hamburg, Stockholm (1925), reaching Buenos Aires in 1932 and Cairo in 1934. The opera was performed for the first time in Canada at the 1961 Montreal Festivals.

== Musical background ==
In relation to Ravel's vocal writing in the opera, Alexis Roland-Manuel wrote "The language of the music is linked up as naturally as possible with the music of the language". In an interview published two days before the premiere, Ravel explained his approach to his new opera. "I have written an opéra-bouffe. Apart from [Gonzalve] who sings sérénades and cavatines with deliberately exaggerated melodies, the other rôles will give, I think, the impression of being spoken." Ravel also cited Mussorgsky's The Marriage for the effect he was aiming to achieve in the word setting, and underlined the Spanish elements of the score in his use of jotas, habaneras and malagueñas. Kobbé commented that from "the delightful clock noises of the opening to the Habanera quintet of the end, L'Heure Espagnole is full of charming music", while Grove notes that the opera is one of a group of Spanish-influenced works that span Ravel's career and that in it he employed "a virtuoso use of the modern orchestra".

== Roles ==
Role	Voice type	Premiere Cast, 19 May 1911 (Conductor: François Ruhlmann)
Torquemada, a clockmaker	tenor	Maurice Cazeneuve
Concepción, Torquemada's wife	mezzo-soprano	Geneviève Vix
Gonzalve, a student poet	tenor	Maurice Coulomb
Ramiro, a muleteer	baritone	Jean Périer
Don Iñigo Gomez, a banker	bass	Hector Dufranne

== Synopsis ==
Time: 18th century

Place: The workshop of the clockmaker Torquemada in Toledo, Spain.

The opera takes place in 21 scenes, with an introduction.

Torquemada is at work in his shop when the muleteer Ramiro stops by to have his watch fixed, so that he can fulfill his duties at collecting the town's post. It is Thursday, the day that Torquemada goes out to tend the municipal clocks, so Ramiro must wait. Torquemada's wife, Concepción, enters to complain that her husband hasn't yet moved a clock into her bedroom. After Torquemada has left, she takes advantage of his absence to plan assignations with gentleman friends. However, the presence of Ramiro is initially a hindrance. So she asks him to move a grandfather clock to her bedroom, which he agrees to do.

Meanwhile, she waits for Gonzalve, a poet. He arrives, and is inspired to poetry, but not to sex, where Concepción would prefer the latter. When Ramiro is about to return, she sends him back saying that she chose the wrong clock. She then has the idea of having Gonzalve hide in one clock so that Ramiro can carry him upstairs. After Gonzalve is concealed, Don Iñigo, a banker and another of Concepción's gentleman friends, arrives. When Ramiro returns, she persuades him to carry up the clock with Gonzalve concealed in it, and she accompanies him.

On his own, Don Iñigo conceals himself in another clock. Ramiro enters, asked to watch the shop, and musing on how little he understands of women. Concepción then summons him back upstairs, saying that the clock's hands are running backwards. She and Don Iñigo try to communicate, but Ramiro arrives back with the other clock. Don Iñigo has hidden himself again, and Ramiro now carries up the clock with Don Iñigo upstairs.

With Gonzalve now downstairs, Concepción tries to turn him away from poetry towards her, but Gonzalve is too absorbed to follow her lead. Ramiro returns, and Gonzalve must conceal himself again. He offers to take the second clock up again. Impressed by how easily Ramiro carries the clocks (and their load) upstairs, Concepción begins to be physically attracted to him.

With Gonzalve and Don Iñigo now each stuck in clocks, Torquemada returns from his municipal duties. Both Gonzalve and Don Iñigo eventually escape their respective clock enclosures, the latter with more difficulty. To save face, they each have to purchase a clock. Concepción is now left without a clock, but she muses that she can wait for the muleteer to appear regularly with his watch repaired. The opera ends with a quintet finale, as the singers step out of character to intone the moral of the tale, paraphrasing Boccaccio:

"Entre tous les amants, seul amant efficace,
Il arrive un moment, dans les déduits d'amour,
Où le muletier a son tour!"

"Among all lovers, only the efficient succeed,
The moment arrives, in the pursuit of love,
When the muleteer has his turn!"

== Dedication ==
Ravel dedicated L'heure espagnole to Louise Cruppi, whose son he would later commemorate with one of the movements of Le Tombeau de Couperin.

== Orchestration ==
Woodwinds

piccolo
2 flutes
2 oboes
English horn
2 clarinets in A/B♭
bass clarinet in B♭
2 bassoons
sarrusophone

Brass

4 horns in F
2 trumpets in C
3 trombones
contrabass tuba in C

Percussion

timpani

snare drum
bass drum
cymbals
spring (ressort)
tambourine
tam-tam
triangle
castanets
ratchet (crécelle)
whip (fouet)
sleigh bells (grelots)
tubular bells
glockenspiel
xylophone
3 clock pendulums

Keyboards

celesta

Strings

2 harps

violins
violas
cellos
double basses

== Recordings ==
- VAI VAIA CD 1073: Jeanne Krieger (Concepción); Louis Arnoult (Gonzalve); Raoul Gilles (Torquemada); Jean Aubert (Ramiro); Hector Dufranne (Don Iñigo Gomez), Orchestra; Georges Truc, conductor (1929, recorded under the supervision of the composer)
- INA, mémoire vive CD IMV027: Géori Boué (Concepción); Louis Arnoult (Gonzalve); Jean Planel (Torquemada); Roger Bourdin (Ramiro); Charles Paul (Don Iñigo Gomez), Orchestra; Manuel Rosenthal, conductor (1944 radio broadcast)
- La Voix de son maître. Denise Duval (Concepción); Jean Giraudeau (Gonzalve); René Hérent (Torquemada); Jean Vieuille (Ramiro); Charles Clavensy (Don Iñigo Gomez), Orchestre de l'Opéra Comique; André Cluytens, conductor (1953)
- Decca. Suzanne Danco (Concepción); Paul Derenne (Gonzalve); Michel Hamel (Torquemada); Heinz Rehfuss (Ramiro); André Vessières (Don Iñigo Gomez), Orchestre de la Suisse Romande; Ernest Ansermet, conductor (1953)
- Vox PL7880. Janine Linda (Concepción); André Dran (Gonzalve); Jean Mollien (Torquemada); Jean Hoffman (Ramiro); Lucien Mans (Don Iñigo Gomez), L'Orchestre Radio-Symphonique de Paris de la Radiodiffusion Française; René Leibowitz, conductor (1953)
- Deutsche Grammophon 138 970 (original LP issue): Jane Berbié (Concepción), Michel Sénéchal (Gonzalve), Jean Giraudeau (Torquemada), Gabriel Bacquier (Ramiro), José van Dam (Don Iñigo Gomez); Orchestre National de l'ORTF, Paris; Lorin Maazel, conductor (1963)
- Erato ECD 75318: Elizabeth Laurence (Concepción), Tibère Raffalli (Gonzalve), Michel Sénéchal (Torquemada), Gino Quilico (Ramiro), François Loup (Don Iñigo Gomez); Nouvel Orchestre Philharmonique; Armin Jordan, conductor (1987)
- Deutsche Grammophon 0289 457 5902 9: Kimberly Barber (Concepción), John Mark Ainsley (Gonzalve), Georges Gautier (Torquemada), Kurt Ollmann (Ramiro), David Wilson-Johnson (Don Iñigo Gomez), London Symphony Orchestra; André Previn, conductor
- Naxos 8.660337: Isabelle Druet (Concepción), Frédéric Antoun (Gonzalve), Luca Lombardo (Torquemada), Marc Barrard (Ramiro), Nicolas Courjal (Don Iñigo Gomez); Orchestre National de Lyon; Leonard Slatkin, conductor
- SWR Classic SWR19016CD: Stéphanie d'Oustrac (Concepción), Yann Beuron (Gonzalve), Jean-Paul Fouchécourt (Torquemada), Alexandre Duhamel (Ramiro), Paul Gay (Don Iñigo Gomez); Stuttgart Radio Symphony Orchestra; Stéphane Denève, conductor
- BR Klassik 900317: Gaelle Arquez (Concepción), Julien Behr (Gonzalve), Mathias Vidal (Torquemada), Alexandre Duhamel (Ramiro), Lionel Lhote (Don Iñigo Gomez); Munich Radio Orchestra; Asher Fisch, conductor
- Kultur (DVD), Glyndebourne Festival Opera (1987): Anna Steiger (Concepción), Thierry Dran (Gonzalve), Remy Corazza (Torquemada), François Le Roux (Ramiro), François Loup (Don Iñigo Gomez); Frank Corsaro, stage director; London Philharmonic Orchestra; Sian Edwards, conductor
- Fra Musica (DVD), Glyndebourne Festival Opera (2012): Stéphanie d'Oustrac (Concepción), Alek Shrader (Gonzalve), Francois Piolino (Torquemada), Elliot Madore (Ramiro), Paul Gay (Don Iñigo Gomez); Laurent Pelly, stage director; London Philharmonic Orchestra; Kazushi Ono, conductor
