= Ernest Bour =

French conductor (1913–2001)

Ernest Bour (20 April 1913 – 20 June 2001) was a noted conductor. Born in Thionville, Moselle (in north-eastern Lorraine, then part of Germany), Bour studied at both the University and the Conservatoire of Strasbourg. His conducting teachers included Fritz Münch and Hermann Scherchen.

Perhaps his most heard recording is of Ligeti's Atmospheres with the Southwest German Radio Symphony Orchestra on the soundtrack to 2001: A Space Odyssey.

After serving as chorus master for the radio choruses of Geneva and Strasbourg, he was appointed conductor of the Orchestre de Mulhouse in 1941. In 1950, he became conductor of the Strasbourg Philharmonic Orchestra and in 1955 of the Strasbourg Opera House, where he had conducted the premiere of Delannoy's Puck in 1949. He was principal conductor of the SWF Symphony Orchestra in Baden-Baden from 1964 to 1979. He conducted the European premiere of Berio's Sinfonia during the 1969 Donaueschingen Festival by the Southwest German Radio Symphony Orchestra. From 1976 until 1987, he was permanent guest conductor of the Netherlands Radio Chamber Orchestra located in the VARA radio headquarters in Hilversum.

Bour's repertoire was marked by a concentration on contemporary music. World premières he presided over included works by Bussotti, Ferneyhough, Górecki, Ligeti, Rihm, Stockhausen and Xenakis. He also gave the French premières of Hindemith's Symphony Mathis der Maler and Stravinsky's The Rake's Progress and the European premiere of Susman's Trailing Vortices. His recordings ranged from music of François Couperin to André Jolivet.

Bour died on 20 June 2001 in Strasbourg, aged 88.

Cultural offices
Preceded by Hans Rosbaud	Principal Conductor, Southwest German Radio Symphony Orchestra; 1964–1979	Succeeded by Kazimierz Kord
