= Jules Bastin =

Belgian operatic bass

Jules Bastin (18 August 1933, Brussels – 2 December 1996, Waterloo) was a Belgian operatic bass who excelled in both serious and comic roles, and left several recordings.

== Life and career ==
Born in Pont-Bellevaux-Ligneuville, he was briefly a teacher of German, French and history before vocal studies in Brussels led to a professional singing career. He won prizes at singing competitions in Verviers, Toulouse, 's-Hertogenbosch and Munich.

Bastin made his debut in 1960 at La Monnaie, singing Caronte in L'Orfeo. He appeared at major opera houses throughout Europe, including the Royal Opera House, La Scala, and the Palais Garnier; he also sang at festivals in Salzburg, Edinburgh, Aix-en-Provence and Florence, and in America at Buenos Aires, Philadelphia and Toronto.

He was known for playing roles from a variety of operatic traditions, from Monteverdi to Berg, but he was perhaps most famous for singing the Baron Ochs in Richard Strauss's Der Rosenkavalier; his "fine, full-toned voice, presence and gift for comedy make him a superb Ochs". In buffo style roles he sang Mozart's Osmin and Don Alfonso, Rossini's Dr Bartolo and Donizetti's as Sulpice, which "exploited his gifts as a buffo bass", as well as recording several Offenbach operettas. In 1979 he took place in the premiere of the three-act version of Lulu in Paris as the Theatre Director. In Verdi opera he portrayed Ramfis and the Grand Inquisitor, both "exploiting his resonant delivery and exemplary diction".

The New York Times reported: "Mr. Bastin sang the starring bass roles in Verdi's Don Carlo and in operas by Mozart, Wagner and other composers. Although best known for his sensitive interpretation of works in French and Italian, his favorite role was that of Baron Ochs in Der Rosenkavalier". The obituary in Opera noted he was "accomplished as an actor and as a singer, he excelled in roles calling for display of character". After becoming successful in opera, he continued to teach voice at the Royal Music Conservatory in Brussels.

Bastin left a range of recordings representative of his repertoire, and the Bibliothèque nationale de France site lists several video recordings with him in, Les Trois Souhaits ou Les vicissitudes de la vie from Lyon (the captain, 1991), L'étoile (Siroco, 1986), and L'amour des trois oranges (female chef, 1989).

== Selected discography ==
- Berlioz: Benvenuto Cellini (Balducci) conducted by Colin Davis, Philips 1972
- Berlioz: La Damnation de Faust (Méphistophélès) conducted by Colin Davis, Philips, 1973, and by Daniel Barenboim, DG, 1979
- Massenet Cendrillon (Pandolphe) conducted by Julius Rudel, CBS, 1978
- Strauss Der Rosenkavalier (Baron Ochs) conducted by Edo de Waart, recorded by Philips in 1976
- Mozart Così fan tutte (Alfonso) conducted by Alain Lombard, Erato 1977
- Mozart Le nozze di Figaro (Bartolo) conducted by Herbert von Karajan, Decca, recorded 1978
- Berlioz: Romeo et Juliette (Père Laurence) conducted by Daniel Barenboim, DG, 1980
- Mélodies Françaises (with Paule Van den Driessche, piano) - L'horizon chimérique by Fauré, Quatre Poèmes d’après l’« Intermezzo » de Henri Heine by Ropartz, Chansons de Don Quichotte by Ibert, Huit Anecdotes de Chamfort by Françaix, Chansons gaillardes by Poulenc and Don Quichotte à Dulcinée by Ravel - Pavane Records 1980
- Charpentier: Mors Saülis et Jonathae H.403, conducted by Louis Devos, Erato, 1981
- He took part in several Grétry opera recordings: La Caravane du Caire (1991), Le Judgement de Midas (1989), L'amant jaloux (1977) and Richard Coeur-de-Lion (1977)
