= Marcel Delannoy =

French composer (1898–1962)

Marcel-François-Georges Delannoy (9 July 1898 – 14 September 1962) was a French composer and critic. He wrote operas, ballets, orchestral works, vocal and chamber works, and film scores.

== Life and career ==
Marcel Delannoy was born at La Ferté-Alais, Essonne, France. He initially studied painting and architecture and entered the École des Beaux-Arts, but at age 20 he took up music. Having been mobilised during the First World War, he then worked as an artist. However, he was initially self-taught and never attended a conservatory, but he did receive some encouragement from Arthur Honegger (whose biography he wrote in 1953) and some lessons from Alexis Roland-Manuel and André Gedalge. He made his name with the opera Le Poirier de misère (1927), which attracted favourable commentary from Maurice Ravel, among others. That same year, he was one of ten composers who collaborated on a children's ballet, L'éventail de Jeanne (contributing the 'Bourrée').

In 1932, Delannoy was one of five composers approached by the producers of the film Don Quichotte for a series of songs to be sung by its star, the Russian bass Feodor Chaliapin. The other composers invited were Ravel, Jacques Ibert, Manuel de Falla and Darius Milhaud. Ibert's setting was chosen for the film.

He wrote criticism for Les Nouveaux temps, where he reviewed the first Paris performance of Olivier Messiaen's Quartet for the End of Time on 24 June 1941, in which he strongly objected to the written commentary accompanying the work.

The Association de Musique Contemporaine (AMC), of which Delannoy was a committee member, included his works in its early concerts of 1940-41. He also became a member of the Groupe Collaboration. Although showing the influence of Honegger, Delannoy carved his own separate path somewhat apart from contemporary trends.

Alice Swanson Esty commissioned and premiered his song cycle La Voix du Silence (1958).

The baroque oboist and recorder player Michel Piguet (1932–2004) studied with Delannoy.

Delannoy married the pianist Lisette Claveau. He died in Nantes. There is now a Rue Marcel Delannoy in his birthplace of La Ferté-Alais.

== Recordings ==
Delannoy's Sérénade concertante for violin and orchestra (soloist Henri Merkel) and the 'Danse des Négrillons' and 'Apothéose' from La Pantoufle de vair were recorded by the Paris Conservatoire Orchestra conducted by Charles Munch in July 1941. The Complainte de l'homme-serpent from the operetta Philippine was recorded by Hugues Cuénod. Extracts from Ginèvra were recorded by the original cast of the Opéra-Comique conducted by Roger Désormière in June 1943.

== Musical works ==
=== Operas ===
- 1927: Le Poirier de misère, opéra-comique, 3 acts; 21 February 1927
- 1937: Philippine, operetta, 2 acts
- 1942: Ginèvra, opéra-comique, 3 acts (Paris, 25 July 1942; title role created by Irène Joachim)
- 1946: Puck, opera, 3 acts, after A Midsummer Night's Dream (1949, Strasbourg; performed in Berlin in 1951)
- 1953: Maria Goretti, radiophonic opera
- 1962: La Nuit du temps, chamber opera

=== Ballets ===
- 1927: Bourée from L'éventail de Jeanne (a ballet written in collaboration with Georges Auric, Pierre-Octave Ferroud, Jacques Ibert, Darius Milhaud, Francis Poulenc, Maurice Ravel, Alexis Roland-Manuel, Albert Roussel and Florent Schmitt)
- 1930: La Fou de la dame, chanson de geste
- 1935: La Pantoufle de vair, also known as Cendrillon, ballet after Charles Perrault
- 1946: Les Noces fantastiques (Serge Lifar)
- 1952: Travesti
- 1966: Venise seuil des eaux
- Au Royaume de la comète, ballet-cantate

=== Orchestral works ===
- 1930: Figures sonores (chamber orchestra)
- 1933: Symphony No. 1
- 1936: Sérénade concertante, violin and orchestra
- 1940: Ballade, orchestra
- 1950: Concerto de mai, Op. 50, piano and orchestra
- 1954: Symphony No. 2, Op. 54, strings and celesta
- 1958: Ballade concertante, piano and 12 instruments
- 1958: Le Moulin de la Galette, orchestra
- Suite from Le Marchand de lunettes
- Suite from La Pantoufle de vair
- Intermezzo
- Esquisse symphonique
- L'Homme danse
- Rhapsody, piano and small ensemble

=== Vocal works ===
- 1933: Trois chansons de Don Quichotte, voice and orchestra (for the film Don Quichotte but not used)
- 1937: Les Trois Choux de Monsieur Patacaisse, scène lyrique
- 1949: Tombeau d'amour, voice and strings
- 1949: Neige, voice and orchestra
- 1950: État de veille, Op. 48, voice and orchestra
- 1958: La Voix du Silence, song cycle
- Suite à chanter, voice and piano
- Cinq Quatrains de Francis Jammes, voice and piano

=== Instrumental works ===
- String Quartet in E major
- Diner sur l'eau, piano
- Rapsodie for trumpet, alto saxophone, cello, and piano (1934)

=== Film scores ===
- La terre est ronde (1960) (TV)
- La Bande à papa (1956)
- Le guérisseur (1953)
- Malaire (1952)
- Due sorelle amano (1950)
- Summer Storm (1949)
- Le bateau à soupe (1947)
- The Lost Village (1947)
- La ferme du pendu (1945; aka Hanged Man's Farm)
- Monsieur des Lourdines (1943)
- Le marchand de notes (1942)
- Volpone (1941)
- Night in December (1940)
- Tempête (1940; aka Thunder Over Paris)
- Une femme chipée (1934)
- Il était une fois (1933; aka Once Upon a Time)
- The Two Orphans (1933)

== Sources ==
- Grove's Dictionary of Music and Musicians, 5th ed., 1954, Eric Blom, ed.
- Operaone
