= Midgley (surname) =

- Pronunciation: /ˈmɪdʒli/
- Language: English

Origin
- Language: English
- Derivation: "micg" (Midge) + "leah" (glade)
- Meaning: "Midge glad"

Other names
- Variant form: Midgeley

Midgley is an English surname which originates from the place name of Midgley, near Mytholmroyd, Yorkshire. Notable people with the name include:

- Craig Midgley (born 1976), English football manager and former player
- G. C. J. Midgley (1921–1997), British philosopher of language
- Hannah Midgley (born 1993), British actress
- Harry Midgley (1893–1957), British politician
- John Edward Maurice Midgley (1935–2023), British biochemist
- Magdalena Midgley (1952–2014), British archaeologist
- Mary Midgley (1919–2018), British philosopher of ethics and animal rights
- Robin Midgley (1934–2007), British theatre, television and radio director
- Roger Midgley (1924–2019) British field hockey player
- Thomas Midgley (footballer) (1856–1957) was a British professional footballer
- Thomas Midgley Jr. (1889–1944), American mechanical and chemical engineer
- Waldo Midgley (1888–1986) was an American artist, including as a depictor of the Black Rock of the Great Salt Lake
- The Midgley family, a British family of opera singers:
  - Gladys Midgley (1911–2005) soprano singer
  - Walter Midgley (1914–1980) operatic tenor
  - Vernon Midgley (born 1940), tenor singer
  - Maryetta Midgley (born 1942), soprano singer
