= My Funny Valentine (Frederica von Stade album) =

- EMI Records CD, CDC7 54071-2

Studio album by Frederica von Stade
- Released: 1990
- Studios: Studio No. 1, Abbey Road, London
- Genres: Musical theatre and crossover
- Length: 69:14
- Language: English
- Label: EMI Records
- Producer: Simon Woods

My Funny Valentine: Frederica von Stade sings Rodgers and Hart is a 69-minute studio album of songs from Richard Rodgers and Lorenz Hart's musicals, performed in historically authentic versions by von Stade, Rosemary Ashe, Peta Bartlett, Lynda Richardson, the Ambrosian Chorus and the London Symphony Orchestra under the direction of John McGlinn. It was released in 1990.

== Background ==
The album was the third that von Stade and McGlinn made together, coming after their recordings of Jerome Kern's Show Boat and Cole Porter's Anything Goes. Like its predecessors, the album presents its music in original orchestrations where these are extant.

According to McGlinn, the album's track 13 is the first instance of "Now that I know you" being recorded.

== Recording ==
The album was digitally recorded in September 1989 in Studio No. 1, Abbey Road, London.

== Cover art ==
The cover of the album features a photograph of von Stade taken by Julian Broad.

== Critical reception ==
=== Reviews ===
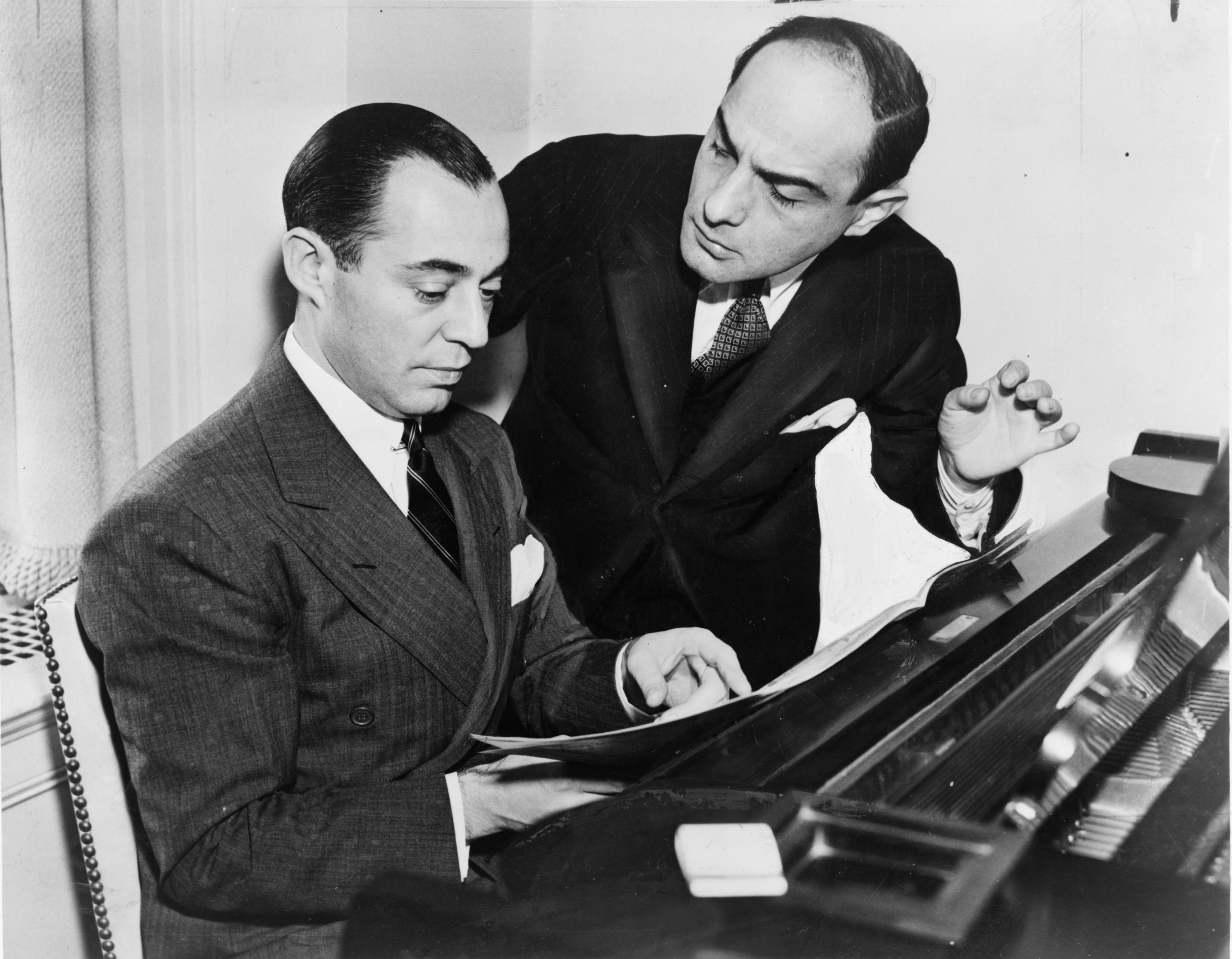
Richard Rodgers (left) and Lorenz Hart in 1936

Adrian Edwards reviewed the album in Gramophone in February 1991. Frederica von Stade's anthology of songs by Richard Rodgers and Lorenz Hart was, he wrote, "well-nigh indispensable". It presented an imaginative mixture of numbers that listeners would already know and others that they would probably be hearing for the first time. They would discover that Rodgers and Hart had come up with many songs just as enjoyable as "Bewitched, bothered and bewildered" or the CD's title track.

Edwards had approached the disc unsure about whether he would like it or not. Von Stade was an opera singer, and a high mezzo-soprano. Most of the songs on her disc had been conceived for voices that were lower than hers, and that had been trained for Broadway rather than for bel canto. ("Falling in love with love" was one of the few of the album's songs that Rodgers had intended for a voice of the von Stade kind.) As things turned out, she suited the repertoire well. In her earlier Rodgers album - Erich Kunzel's recording of The Sound of Music - she had not seemed as deeply engaged with Oscar Hammerstein's lyrics as she might have been. Surprisingly, although Rodgers and Hart's work was more remote from opera than Rodgers and Hammerstein's, the former elicited "a far keener" response from von Stade than the latter, "the Rodgers of the 1920s and 1930s [bringing] a far livelier personality to the fore" than the composer of 1959.

It was difficult to say which of the tracks on von Stade's album was the best. She was good in typical interwar fare like "Atlantic blues", and just as good in introspective numbers like "A ship without a sail". Her record reminded one that there was more to Hart than his "sharp, cynical way with a rhyme"; he could also dream up romantic couplets like "You're nearer than my head is to my pillow, Nearer than the wind is to the willow". "The accompanying Rodgers tune, if you'll forgive the pun, would melt any heart."

As in his seminal recordings of Show Boat and Anything Goes, John McGlinn had presented his material in a form as close as possible to that of its first performance. The period orchestrations which he had championed "[did not] miss a trick to underline the syncopation in Rodgers's writing". The playing of the London Symphony Orchestra was "tip-top", and McGlinn's advocacy of Rodgers and Hart was enthusiastic. The album's only fault was that its accompanying booklet gave an inaccurate date for Rodgers's death. Edward expected that "at a ration of three or four songs per sitting", he would return to it many times.

David Deutsch reviewed the album in Fanfare in May 1991. Frederica von Stade's recording offered an engaging programme that blended famous songs with others, like "Atlantic blues", that even some Rodgers devotees would probably never have come across before. Most of them were performed in the "delightful" orchestrations crafted for their theatrical debuts by Hans Spialek and his contemporaries. Several included passages of dance music which were particularly entertaining.

Von Stade had ventured into musical theatre before in her recordings of Show Boat and Anything Goes. Rodgers and Hart took her beyond comedy into a territory that brought new challenges. "These she meets with characteristic intelligence, integrity and emotional honesty", but not with unqualified success. The photograph of her happy face on the cover of her album could be taken as a symbol of both her talents and her limitations. There was "no warmer, no more spiritually aligned opera star today" than von Stade - her Magnolia Hawkes in Show Boat and her Hope Harcourt in Anything Goes were both notable for their "sunniness and generosity of spirit". It was when Rodgers's music was most in sympathy with her own artistic temperament that her interpretations of his songs were at their best,

In "I must love you", for example, she was perfect for the line "And if my life is blessed with joys, I owe each thing to you". The wistful "You're never here" was beautiful, and "When or where" "simply lovely, the melody a gift to her voice - and vice versa". In "Bye and bye", the second refrain "with its intimate, personal tone" was as wonderful as a sunburst.

There were also sadder songs which she handled satisfactorily. In "A ship without a sail", "that sublime outpouring of pain and loss, she finds a parched, 'lost' sound, tinged with just the right hint of melancholy and self-pity", However, some other numbers were disappointing. "I didn't know what time it was", "To keep my love alive" and "Bewitched, bothered and bewildered" all failed to hit the mark. One could hear that von Stade was striving to convey the "underlying masochism or despair" of Hart's dark lyrics - her Mrs Simpson from Pal Joey, for instance, was delivered with a hard-edged tone to express the matriarch's bitterness. But she was far less eloquent in numbers like these than she had been as Magnolia or Hope, when "grief, sorrow or yearning or anger are given their due, but we can be confident that self-healing has already begun".

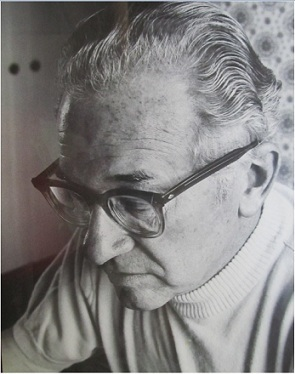
Orchestrator Don Walker, photographed by Greg Penn

In matters of technique, too, von Stade's success was only partial. While never sounding anything but an opera singer, she did go at least some way towards the speech-like delivery which Broadway vocalism demands. And it was obvious that she was conscientiously trying to sing with appropriately informal diction, sometimes to the point of excess - her frequent pronunciation of "t" as "d" sounded artificial. She also erred in sometimes eliding consonants at the ends of phrases, and perpetrated a "tousled" that needed a retake.

Conducting, John McGlinn was his usual, straightforward self, judicious in his choice of tempos but lacking "a taut inner rhythm in the fast numbers". It was a pity that he had not encouraged von Stade to make her music more subservient to her texts: it was at those moments when she gave herself permission to bend her line in the interest of her words that she was most evidently the "great, imaginative artist" who was so wonderful in Rossini or Mozart. But all in all, the strengths of her album greatly outweighed its weaknesses, and it was a disc that was worth listening to and returning to.

The album was also reviewed in American Record Guide, The New Republic, Show Music and Theater Week, and discussed in Dan Dietz's The Complete Book of 1920s Broadway Musicals and Clyde T. McCants's American Opera Singers and their Recordings.

=== Accolade ===
Writing in Gramophone in January 1992, Adrian Edwards included the album in his Critics' Choice list of the best recordings of the year.

== CD track listing ==
Music by Richard Rodgers (1902-1979) and lyrics by Lorenz Hart (1895-1943)

- 1 (4:34) "My Funny Valentine" from Babes in Arms (1937); orchestration by Hans Spialek (1894-1983)
- 2 (4:52) "I Must Love You" from Chee-Chee (1928); orchestration by Roy Webb (1888-1982)
- 3 (4:34) "I Didn't Know What Time It Was" from Too Many Girls (1939); orchestration by Hans Spialek
- 4 (3:46) "Moon of My Delight" from Chee-Chee; orchestration by Roy Webb
- 5 (4:02) "Ev'rybody Loves You" from I'd Rather Be Right (1937); orchestration by Hans Spialek
- 6 (5:01) "A Ship without A Sail" from Heads Up! (1929); anonymous orchestration
- 7 (5:10) "Quiet Night" from On Your Toes (1938); orchestration by Hans Spialek; with the Ambrosian Chorus
- 8 (3:56) "To Keep My Love Alive" from A Connecticut Yankee (1943 revival); orchestration by Don Walker (1907-1989)
- 9 (2:34) "Love Never Went to College" from Too Many Girls; orchestration by Hans Spialek
- 10 (3:28) "You're Nearer" from Too Many Girls (1940 film version); orchestration by Larry Moore (verse) and Hans Spialek
- 11 (3:48) "If I Were You" from Betsy (1926); orchestration by Stephen Jones and Hans Spialek; with Rosemary Ashe, Lynda Richardson and Peta Bartlett
- 12 (4:57) "Bewitched, Bothered and Bewildered" from Pal Joey (1940); orchestration by Hans Spialek
- 13 (2:45) "Now That I Know You" from Two Weeks with Pay (1940); orchestration by Maurice de Packh
- 14 (4:04) "Bye and Bye" from Dearest Enemy (1925); orchestration by Emil Gerstenberger, reconstructed by Russell Warner
- 15 (4:18) "Atlantic Blues" from Lido Lady (1926); orchestration by Hans Spialek
- 16 (4:11) "Where or When" from Babes in Arms; orchestration by Hans Spialek
- 17 (3:11) "Falling in Love with Love" from The Boys from Syracuse (1938); orchestration by Hans Spialek; with the Ambrosian Chorus

== Personnel ==
=== Musical ===
- Frederica von Stade, singer
- Rosemary Ashe, singer
- Lynda Richardson, singer
- Peta Bartlett, singer
- The Ambrosian Chorus
- John McCarthy, chorus master
- The London Symphony Orchestra
- John McGlinn (1953-2009), conductor

=== Other ===
- Simon Woods, producer
- John Kurlander, balance engineer

== Release history ==
In 1990, EMI Records released the album on LP (catalogue number EL 754071-1), cassette (catalogue number EL 754071-4) and CD (catalogue number CDC7 54071-2). The CD came with a 28-page insert booklet including texts of all the songs in English and detailed notes on each of them by John McGlinn in English, French and German.

== See also ==
- Jerome Kern: Show Boat, with Frederica von Stade, conducted by John McGlinn, EMI, 1988
- Cole Porter: Anything Goes, with Frederica von Stade, conducted by John McGlinn, EMI, 1989
- Richard Rodgers: The Sound of Music, with Frederica von Stade, conducted by Erich Kunzel, Telarc, 1988
