= Midgley family =

The Midgley family is a British theatrical family whose members are notable in light music, opera and operetta.

- Walter Midgley (1914-1980) was an internationally renowned operatic tenor.
- Gladys Midgley (1911-2005) was a soprano.
- Maryetta Midgley (born 1942) is their daughter and a soprano.
- Vernon Midgley (born 1940) is a tenor.
