= Anything Goes (1989 cast album) =

- EMI Records CD: CDC7 49848-2

Studio album by John McGlinn
- Released: 1989
- Studios: CTS Studios, Wembley, London
- Genre: Musical theatre
- Length: 74:20
- Language: English
- Label: EMI Records
- Producer: John Fraser

Anything Goes is a 74-minute studio recording of a historically informed version of Cole Porter's musical, starring Kim Criswell, Jack Gilford, Cris Groenendaal and Frederica von Stade, performed with the Ambrosian Chorus and the London Symphony Orchestra under the direction of John McGlinn. It was released in 1989.

== Background ==
Anything Goes has been presented in many different versions in the theatre, in the cinema and on record. The goal of John McGlinn's work on the piece was to present it as nearly as possible in accordance with Cole Porter's original wishes. His edition adhered to that of the musical's first performance in Boston on 5 November 1934, except that instead of presenting the Boston score's "There's no cure like travel" in full, he abbreviated it to "Bon Voyage", the version of the number that was performed at the musical's New York première sixteen days after its out-of-town try-out. Several of the show's original orchestrations had been lost, but McGlinn was able to recreate them at least approximately by soliciting the help of Hans Spialek, who, together with Robert Russell Bennett, had composed them. Spialek reproduced his and his colleague's work of half a century earlier as well as he was able to; the few passages that he left incomplete on his death were finished by Russell Warner and by McGlinn himself.

The album includes the whole of "There's no cure like travel" in an appendix, as well as two numbers that were discarded during the show's rehearsal period. "Waltz down the aisle" was a mock-romantic duet intended for Act 1, Scene 6. "Kate the Great", meant to follow "Bon Voyage", was dropped because it was thought too risqué. Ethel Merman, the first Reno Sweeney, was reluctant to sing the line "She made the maid who made the room" lest its implication of lesbianism offend her mother. "Oh, baby," Spialek recalled, "dat's a durr-ty song! Ettel vouldn't sing it!"

== Recording ==
The album was recorded digitally in August 1988 in CTS Studios, Wembley, London.

== Cover art ==
The cover of the album was designed by FM Design, and features an illustration by Bob Murdoch.

== Critical reception ==
=== Reviews ===
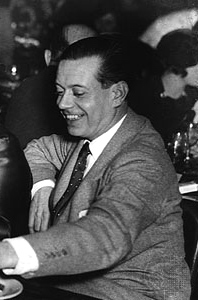
Cole Porter in 1934, the year in which Anything Goes was composed

Andrew Lamb reviewed the album on CD in Gramophone in December 1989, comparing it with recent cast recordings of stagings on Broadway and in London. John McGlinn's disc, he wrote, was wholly different from its rivals. They were recordings of a production (common to both CDs) in which the musical's book had been reworked and its score reorchestrated, and into which numbers from other Cole Porter shows had been inserted. As in his version of Jerome Kern's Show Boat [see Show Boat (1988 cast album) for details], McGlinn had followed a philosophy of historical authenticity, striving to produce "[as] complete as possible a representation of the original material, with some interesting deleted material in an appendix." As he explained in the lengthy booklet accompanying his CD, his disc was the fruit of musical archaeology in which he had dug up orchestrations from the show's birth in 1934 that had been lost for several decades. So intent was he on doing justice to the musical that when he came across a number which had been discarded before an orchestration of it had been undertaken, he had persuaded one of Porter's colleagues to orchestrate it from scratch, even though the musician in question, Hans Spialek, was 88 years old and afflicted with cancer.

McGlinn's efforts had created an album that sounded radically different from the comparison discs. For one thing, his orchestra was bigger than theirs, with less prominent brass. More conspicuously, although his readings of "Bon voyage", "Where are the men?" and "There'll always be a lady fair" were animated, his tempos were usually slower than modern audiences were used to. This was not because of some whim of his - he had imitated the pacing of the show's earliest cast recordings. His musicians were almost all satisfactory. Kim Criswell was in no way inferior to Broadway's Patti LuPone or London's Elaine Paige, and Cris Groenendaal likewise was the equal of his counterparts. McGlinn had been "inspired", too, when he had turned to the elderly Jack Gilford for the character part of Moonface Martin (although Pinnacle's Bernard Cribbins also deserved praise for his "clearly projected" version of the role). And "the Ambrosian Chorus sing and the London Symphony Orchestra play as though they were born to music such as this". The album's only defect was its casting of Frederica von Stade as Hope Harcourt - "Her soprano does really seem a shade too operatic for the piece". In sum, the RCA and Pinnacle discs were rewarding mementos of the production that they documented, and people who had last heard Porter's show in theatres in London or New York might find McGlinn's way with it initially disconcerting. But anyone who cherished vintage recordings of the work or who took the view that the orchestration of a musical was essential to its quiddity would "find this McGlinn version irresistible".

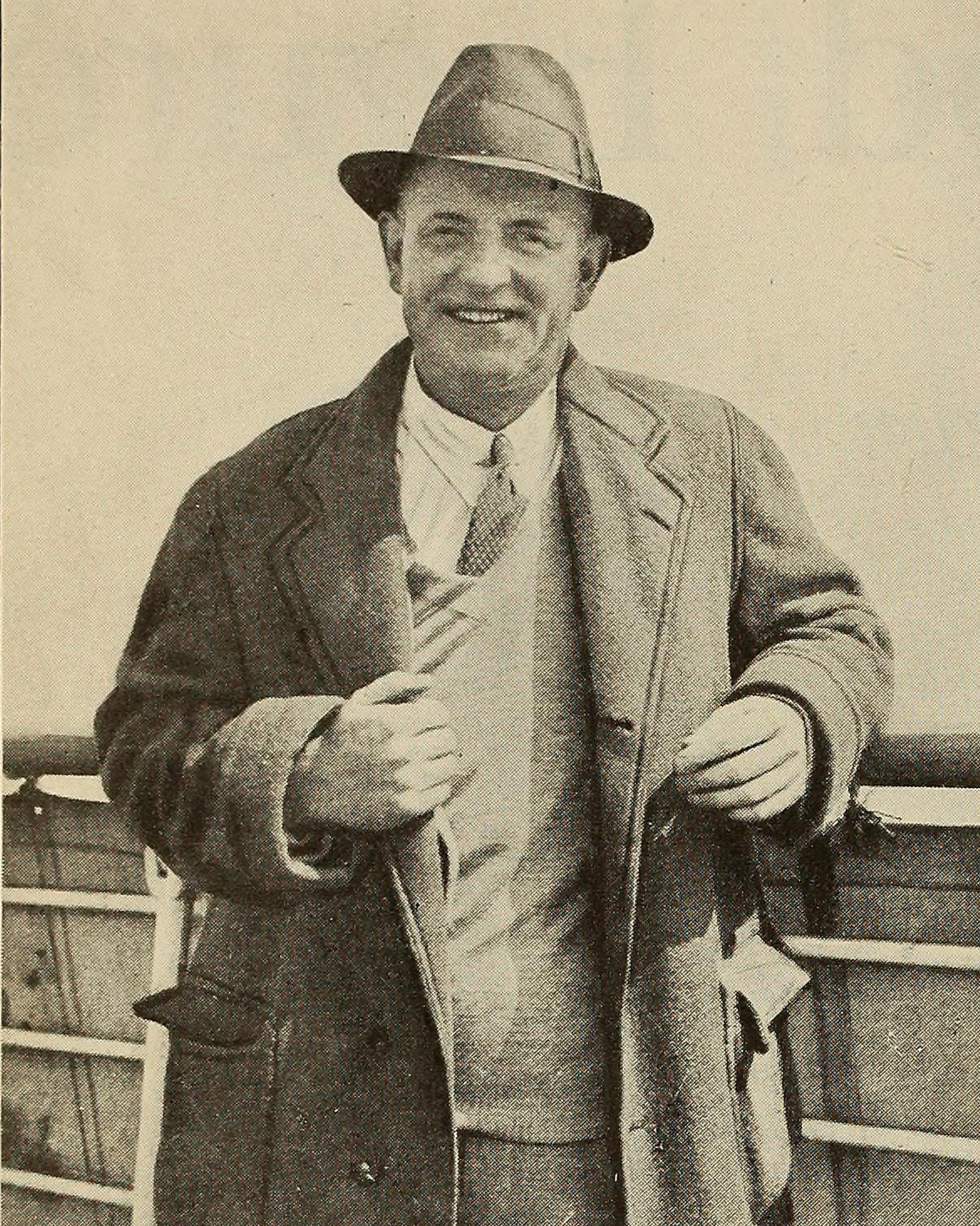
P. G. Wodehouse in 1930

Lamb revisited the album in Gramophone in October 1990, withdrawing the only criticism that he had levelled at it ten months earlier. "Frederica von Stade", he conceded, "is appropriately cast in a role originally assigned to an opera singer."

Roy Hemming reviewed the album on CD in Stereo Review in January 1990. John McGlinn, he wrote, had given listeners the chance to hear what vintage recordings of Anything Goes would have sounded like if their producers had had access to digital technology. Unlike the recent staging at Lincoln Center, his album was loyal to what Cole Porter had written. Transplants from other Porter shows were eschewed, and "Buddie beware" and "What a joy to be young", sometimes victims of the blue pencil, were included. His soloists had both strengths and weaknesses. The best of them were the "splendid" Cris Groenendaal as Billy and Frederica von Stade as a "gorgeously and unaffectedly" sung Hope. Their duet, "All through the night", and her "What a joy to be young" were without question the best two tracks on the album. As Reno Sweeney, the musical's most important role, Kim Criswell sang with "verve and clarity, but also with tones that too often become strident and whiny". Jack Gilford's great age had enfeebled his voice beyond the point where he could sing Moonface Martin's music adequately. Conducting, McGlinn was "the clear star of this production, holding everything together with a winning blend of light-handed snap, dash and genuine lilt." His "spine-tingling" album was a "vivid, authentic superbly recorded" CD that was an example of how the classics of American musical theatre should be recorded.

The album was also reviewed in Opera Now in April 1991: "Cole Porter addicts, look no further. You have died and gone to heaven."

=== Accolade ===
The album won the Gramophone Award for the best musical theatre recording of 1990.

== CD track listing ==
Cole Porter (1891–1964), composer and lyricist

Anything Goes; book by Guy Bolton (1884–1979) and P. G. Wodehouse (1881–1975), revised by Howard Lindsay (1889–1968) and Russel Crouse (1893–1966); orchestrations by Robert Russell Bennett (1894–1981) and Hans Spialek (1894–1983); additional arrangements by Russell Warner and John McGlinn

Act One

- 1 (5:10) Overture
- 2 (2:44) I get a kick out of you: "My story is much too sad to be told..." (Reno)
- 3 (2:33) Bon voyage: "Bon voyage..." (Boys, Girls)
- 4 (6:13) All through the night: "The day is my enemy..." (Billy, Hope, Sailors)
- 5 (3:01) There'll always be a lady fair: "A sailor's life..." (4 Sailors)
- 6 (4:57) Where are the men?: "Officer, we've got something most important to say..." (1st Girl, 2nd Girl, Girls' Chorus)
- 7 (2:27) You're the top: "At words poetic..." (Billy, Reno)
- 8 (3:53) Emcore: You're the top: "You're the top!..." (Reno, Billy)
- 9 (1:37) Reprise: There'll always be a lady fair: "At times when you hit some little town..." (4 Sailors)
- 10 (5:11) Anything goes: "Times have changed..." (Reno, 4 Sailors)
- 11 (2:35) Finale, Act One: "Captain, we've captured Public Enemy Number One..." (Sailor No. 1, Captain, Billy, Hope, Reno, Moonface)
- 12 (1:57) Entr'acte

Act Two

- 13 (2:54) Public Enemy Number One: "Tonight there's going to be some fun..." (4 Sailors, Passengers)
- 14 (3:10) What a joy to be young: "A girl of sweet sixteen..." (Hope)
- 15 (3:18) Blow, Gabriel, blow: "Do you hear that playin'?..." (Reno, Company)
- 16 (2:48) Be like the bluebird: "There's an old Australian bush song..." (Moonface)
- 17 (4:39) Buddie, beware: "Since I know such a lot of men..." (Reno)
- 18 (4:23) The gypsy in me: "Long. long ago..." (Hope)
- 19 (1:34) Finale ultimo: "You're the top..." (All)

Appendix

- 20 (2:54) There's no cure like travel: "My dear, you're sailing off without me..." (Boys, Girls)
- 21 (2:19) Kate the Great: "Catherine of Russia..." (Reno, Angels)
- 22 (3:17) Waltz down the aisle: "When those bells start to chime..." (Evelyn, Hope)

== Personnel ==
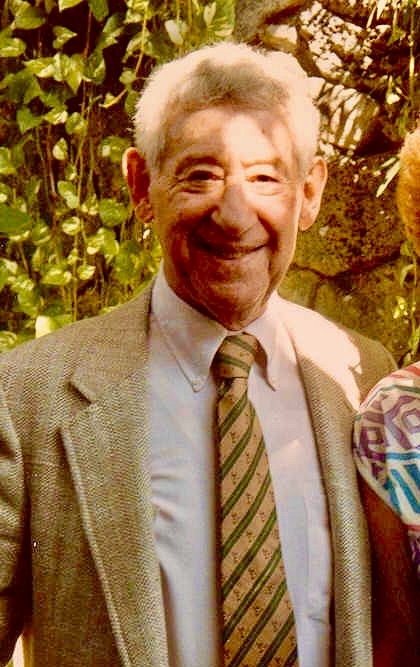
The late Jack Gilford photographed by Alan Light in 1986

=== Musical ===
- Kim Criswell, Reno Sweeney
- Cris Groenendaal, Billy Crocker
- Frederica von Stade, Hope Harcourt
- Jack Gilford (1908–1990), Moonface Martin
- Judy Green, 1st Girl
- Rebecca Caine, 2nd Girl
- Simon Green, Evelyn
- Bryan Landrine, Sailor
- Michael B. Wailing, Sailor
- Bruce Hubbard (1952–1991), Sailor
- Del-Bourree Bach, Sailor
- Phil Ossafee, Captain
- Dustin Stacks, Purser
- Ambrosian Chorus
- London Symphony Orchestra
- John McCarthy, chorus master
- John McGlinn (1953–2009), conductor

=== Other ===
- John Fraser, producer
- John Kurlander, recording engineer
- Morris Miller, editor
- Alison Fox, production assistant

== Release history ==
In 1989, EMI Records released the album on LP (catalogue number EL 749848–1), cassette (catalogue numbers EL 749848–4 in Britain, 4DS 49848 in the US) and CD (catalogue numbers CDC7 49848–2 in Britain, CDC 49848 in the US). The CD issue came in a slipcase with a 144-page book containing photographs of Criswell, Gilford, Groenendaal, von Stade and McGlinn, ten historical illustrations, the lyrics of the musical in English, synopses in English, French and German and essays by Robert Kimball, Miles Kreuger and John McGlinn in the same three languages.
