= Bruce Hubbard =

American operatic baritone (1952–1991)

- Born: Bruce A. Hubbard; 1952; Indianapolis, Indiana, US
- Died: November 12, 1991; New York City, US
- Occupations: Singer, actor; operatic baritone
- Years active: 1970s-1991
- Awards: Drama Desk Award for Outstanding Featured Actor in a Musical nominee (1983); Laurence Olivier Award for Best Actor in a Musical nominee (1991)

Bruce Hubbard (1952 − 12 November 1991) was an American operatic baritone. A Drama Desk and Laurence Olivier Award nominee for Best Actor, he performed on Broadway, the Metropolitan Opera, BBC television, in concert and made several recordings. He is most famous for appearing as Joe in Show Boat, and as Jake, as well as Porgy, in Porgy and Bess on Broadway, the West End, and in several major opera houses and regional theatres. He graduated from the Indiana University Jacobs School of Music.

== Early life ==
Hubbard was born in Indianapolis, Indiana in 1952. He graduated from Arlington High School in 1971. In 1973, while still a student at Indiana University, where he was a music major, he helped coach actors who appeared in musicals. He returned to Indianapolis and recorded two songs on a vinyl LP. He recorded "Antiphon" from Five Mystical Songs by Ralph Vaughan Williams, and "Without a Song" by Vincent Youmans, with the Arlington High School concert choir. This custom album may have been his first formally recorded release.

== Career ==
From 1978 to 1980, after Porgy and Bess, Hubbard was also seen on Broadway and subsequently in two Broadway National tours of Timbuktu!, starring the legendary Eartha Kitt, Melba Moore, Gilbert Price, and William Marshall and directed by the Tony Award winning director, costume designer and choreographer Geoffrey Holder. Hubbard first understudied, then eventually succeeded, Price in the leading role of the Mansa of Mali.

He also appeared in the original company of Alan Jay Lerner and Leonard Bernstein's 1600 Pennsylvania Avenue in the role of Rev. Bushrod, and performed in the first Broadway production of Scott Joplin's Treemonisha.

Hubbard began appearing in productions of Show Boat as far back as 1976, including a touring production featuring Van Johnson as Cap'n Andy. However it was his performance in the acclaimed Houston Grand Opera Broadway production in 1983, with Donald O'Connor, that garnered Hubbard a nomination for the Drama Desk Award for Outstanding Featured Actor in a Musical. But perhaps the most notable production of the musical in which he appeared was not a live staged performance. The 1988 EMI 3-CD set conducted by John McGlinn, featured, for the very first time on recordings, the entire musical score, though not all the dialogue, using the original 1927 vocal arrangements and orchestrations. The album was highly acclaimed and became a best seller. It is still in print today and was chosen as one of EMI's Great Recordings of the Century. On the album, which attempted to be faithful to the original libretto, Hubbard was the first singer in modern times to sing Ol' Man River with its original, controversial lyrics; which included the use of the term "niggers", rather than the more traditional and commonly used phrase, "colored folks."

Use of the original lyric caused considerable controversy before recording even began. Willard White was originally cast as Joe and had been agreeable with McGlinn's vision. But he changed his mind after the all-black chorus, recruited from the Glyndebourne production of Porgy and Bess, strongly objected and sent a letter of protest to EMI. The record company backed McGlinn, and three days before the song was to be recorded, White and the chorus withdrew from the project.

The conductor then turned to the Ambrosian Chorus, which had been signed to sing the white choral passages, to sing all the choral music. To sing Joe, McGlinn then turned to Hubbard, who had played the role on Broadway and happened to be in England singing Jake in the Glyndebourne production of Porgy and Bess. Hubbard said he needed a day to make up his mind and discussed it with a number of friends, including Eartha Kitt. Most, but not all, urged him to sing the word.

Eartha and I talked and agreed that 'Show Boat' is a classic piece, and that this would be the classic recording of it. The way the word was once used is not fiction but fact. Blacks today may want to forget the past and build on the future, but we should never lose our sense of history.

Hubbard then appeared in the highly acclaimed 1986 Glyndebourne Festival revival of Porgy and Bess, as well as in the Metropolitan Opera production. The recording of the Glyndebourne production was also chosen an EMI Great Recording of the Century. Hubbard sang the role of Jake, the fisherman, but had died before the Glyndebourne production was brought to television in 1993. However, because the soundtrack of the recording was used in the Emmy-nominated television version, Hubbard can still be heard as Jake, while baritone Gordon Hawkins plays the role onscreen. However, Hubbard was actually seen in a 1987 televised Metropolitan Opera production of Bizet's Carmen, as the smuggler Le Dancaïre.

After the success of the EMI Show Boat, Hubbard made his recital debut album, entitled For You, For Me on EMI Records label, produced by Patti Laursen. It was conducted by Dennis Russell Davies and released in time for Christmas in 1990. It would be Hubbard's only solo album. It featured Aaron Copland's Old American Songs, Irving Berlin's song "Always", and selections from Porgy and Bess, Girl Crazy, Centennial Summer and 1600 Pennsylvania Avenue. Metropolitan Opera soprano Marvis Martin joined Hubbard in the duet, "Bess, You Is My Woman Now".

He appeared in one film. In Francis Ford Coppola's 1984 film, The Cotton Club, he played one of Bumpy Rhodes' henchmen. The role of Rhodes was played by Laurence Fishburne. In 1987, Hubbard co-starred as a club Manager on The Equalizer in the episode, "Solo."

In 1991, Hubbard was nominated for the Laurence Olivier Award for Best Actor in a Musical, for reprising his role as Joe in the London Palladium production of Show Boat.

== Death ==
In 1991, Hubbard died from pneumonia in New York University Hospital. He was 39 years old.

== Legacy ==
To honor his memory, in 1992, family, friends, and colleagues established the Bruce Hubbard Memorial Scholarship Fund at Indiana University's Jacobs School of Music. The scholarship is awarded annually to voice majors, with preference given to minority students. In announcing the scholarship on its website, the university noted that, in addition to his performances on the musical theatre stage, in recordings and in opera houses across the world, Hubbard had also performed at the White House on three occasions; including an appearance on the PBS series, "In Performance at the White House". In a letter sent to him after one of his concerts, President Ronald Reagan wrote, "Your performance was brilliant and the richness of your voice thrilled us all."

== Discography ==
- Jerome Kern: Show Boat, conducted by John McGlinn, EMI, 1988
- For You, For Me, conducted by Dennis Russell Davies, EMI, 1990
