= My Funny Valentine (disambiguation) =

"My Funny Valentine" is a song by Richard Rodgers and Lorenz Hart.

My Funny Valentine also refers to:

- My Funny Valentine (Miles Davis album)
- My Funny Valentine (Frederica von Stade album)
- My Funny Valentine (Larry Willis album)
- "My Funny Valentine", an episode of the animated series Cowboy Bebop

== See also ==
- Funny Valentine (disambiguation)
