= Karla Burns =

American operatic mezzo-soprano and actress (1954–2021)

- Born: December 24, 1954; Wichita, Kansas
- Died: June 4, 2021 (aged 66); Wichita, Kansas
- Occupations: Actress; singer
- Years active: 1977–2020

Karla Burns (December 24, 1954 – June 4, 2021) was an American mezzo-soprano and actress who performed nationally and internationally in opera houses, theatres, and on television. Her first major success was as Queenie in the Houston Grand Opera's 1982 revival of Oscar Hammerstein II and Jerome Kern's 1927 musical Show Boat. This production premiered in Houston, and then toured nationally and on Broadway. For her portrayal of Queenie, Burns won a Drama Desk Award and received a nomination for the Tony Award. The role of Queenie became a pivotal part in Burn's career, and she portrayed the character in many productions internationally for two decades. For this part, she became the first black person, African-American or otherwise, to win the Laurence Olivier Award, Britain's most prestigious award for theatre.

Burns's career spanned a broad repertoire from musical theatre, to opera, and stage plays. Her work included performances with the Metropolitan Opera, Paris Opera, the Teatro Real, Cairo Opera House, and the Royal Shakespeare Company. On the opera stage she was particularly associated with the role of Addie in Marc Blitzstein's Regina. She toured nationally for many years in her one woman show, Hi-Hat Hattie, in which she portrayed fellow Wichitan Hattie McDaniel, the first black entertainer to win an Academy Award.

== Early life and education ==
Born and raised in Wichita, Kansas, Burns was the daughter of Ira Willie Lee Burns and Catherine S. Burns. The youngest of four children, Burns credited her parents with inspiring her love of music. Her father was a jazz and gospel pianist and her mother, a seamstress and employee of the American Red Cross, sang spirituals and old hymns at church. Burns graduated from Wichita West High School, where she played clarinet in the band and sang in the choir.

Burns attended Wichita State University (WSU), from which she earned a Bachelor of Fine Arts in Music Education and a BA in Theatre Performance. At WSU she performed in several university productions: she was Polly Peachum in Bertolt Brecht's The Threepenny Opera, and also appeared in Arthur Miller's The Crucible and Leonard Bernstein's Mass. She also toured Europe in performances with WSU's choir. She made her professional stage debut in 1977 while still a WSU student at the old Victory Theatre in Wichita. She graduated from WSU in 1981.

== A career defining role: Queenie in Show Boat ==
The part of Queenie in Oscar Hammerstein II and Jerome Kern's Show Boat became a pivotal role in Burn's performance career. She first performed the part in 1981 at the Lyric Theater in Oklahoma City. Her breakthrough performance as an artist was in that role in the musical's celebrated 1982 Houston Grand Opera (HGO) revival. Directed by Michael Kahn and starring Lonette McKee and Ron Raines, the HGO production premiered at Jones Hall in Houston in June 1982, and then toured for performances at the Dorothy Chandler Pavilion in Los Angeles, the Orpheum Theatre in San Francisco, the Kennedy Center for the Performing Arts in Washington D.C., and finally at the Gershwin Theatre on Broadway in 1983. Burns won a Drama Desk Award and was nominated for a Tony Award for her work in this production. The HGO production also toured overseas to the Cairo Opera House in Egypt. Burns commented in an interview that Egyptian audiences struggled to comprehend how a character with so little power could be important to the story. She stated,

I'm of the belief that Queenie is a woman who just happened to have been born in a period that didn't allow her to speak her mind ... But in Egypt they took her name Queenie for Queen. It did something to them culturally, made them feel good about having dark skins. When I was doing interviews there, they really wanted to hear that she was more than just a boat's cook. I was able to tell them, she certainly was.

The role of Queenie became a staple part in Burns's repertoire; after the Broadway production ended, she went on to recreate the character in ten more productions during her career. The most significant of them was a 1989 revival jointly mounted by Opera North and the Royal Shakespeare Company. One theatre critic described Burns's Queenie as, "a dynamo dumpling with enough personality to light up a whole fleet of show boats". When the show moved to the London Palladium in 1991, Burns's contribution to it won her the Laurence Olivier Award, the United Kingdom's most prestigious prize for theatre. This was the first time that a Black artist was awarded this prize. Burns again reprised the role of Queenie with Opéra national du Rhin in Strasbourg, France in 2002. She also recorded the role in 1988 for EMI Classics with the London Sinfonietta and a cast that included Frederica von Stade, Teresa Stratas and Jerry Hadley. In 1994 she performed the role in concert at the Edinburgh Festival Theatre for the Edinburgh International Festival with Sally Burgess as Julie.

== Other performances ==
After the Broadway production of Show Boat closed, Burns was cast as Mary in Noa Ain's jazz opera Trio, which premiered at the American Music Theatre Festival in Philadelphia in July 1984 at the Philadelphia College of Art. She reprised the role at Carnegie Hall the following October. That same month she was a featured performer at the Centenary Gala celebrating the 100th anniversary of the birth of composer Jerome Kern at The Town Hall. In 1985–1986 she starred in a 22-week run in Joan Micklin Silver and Julianne Boyd's A... My Name Is Alice at the Alley Theatre in Houston which later transferred to the Alcazar Theatre in San Francisco. She portrayed Bloody Mary in Rodgers and Hammerstein's South Pacific at the Darien Dinner Theatre in 1986. In 1988 she portrayed Sister Robert Anne in Dan Goggin's Nunsense at the Roxy Theatre in Atlanta.

Burns also appeared in numerous William Shakespeare plays including as the Duke of Ephesus/Luce in the 1987 Lincoln Center production of The Comedy of Errors at the Vivian Beaumont Theater with The Flying Karamazov Brothers. That production was filmed for PBS's Live from Lincoln Center. She appeared in The Comedy Of Errors again, this time as Nell, with New York's Shakespeare in the Park starring Marisa Tomei in 1992. She returned to Shakespeare in the Park in 1993 as Mistress Overdone in Measure for Measure with Kevin Kline, Blair Underwood and Andre Braugher.

On the opera stage, Burns achieved success as Addie in Marc Blitzstein's Regina, which she first performed at the Long Wharf Theatre in 1988. She reprised that role with several opera companies during her career, including Opera Pacific in 1996 and the Chautauqua Opera in 1997. In 1989 Burns appeared at the Metropolitan Opera as Lily in George Gershwin's Porgy and Bess (1989).

Burns is known for the one-woman play Hi-Hat Hattie whose script was written by Larry Parr and examines the life of actress Hattie McDaniel. The show includes 14 songs, none original to the show, arranged by Gordon Twist, including "Amazing Grace", "Can't Help Lovin' Dat Man" from Show Boat and "St. Louis Blues". Burns's debut performance of Hi-Hat Hattie was at the Players Theater of Columbus, Ohio, in 1991. She went on to perform the role in several other cities including off-Broadway in New York and the Florida Studio Theater in Sarasota, Florida. She performed the show in 2006 in honour of the issue of a Hattie McDaniel stamp and as late as the spring of 2018 after recovering from health issues.

Burns's regional theatre productions included roles in several plays and musicals; she appeared as Dolly Levi in Hello, Dolly!, Katisha in The Mikado, Berenice Sadie Brown in The Member of the Wedding, Calpurnia in To Kill a Mockingbird, Mother Shaw in Regina Taylor's Crowns, Jeanette in The Full Monty, and Mother Superior, Robert Anne and Sister Hubert in Nunsense, among others. In 2003 she starred in Andy Razaf's Tan Manhattan at the Chicago Humanities Festival held at Northwestern University.

In addition to her appearance on Live from Lincoln Center, Burns's television credits include the role of Hottie Joseph in the 1984 TV movie The Parade with Geraldine Page. She appeared as Karla the Klown in the children's program One of a Kind, and in the crime drama True Blue with Robert Earl Jones.

For the dedication of the refurbished Orpheum Theater in Wichita, Burns performed with 53 children in Boogie with Burns Broadway Revue in 2003.

== Later years ==
Burns taught private voice lessons in Wichita, utilizing a piano that was once played by Duke Ellington. In 2007 she had surgery to remove an almost ten-pound goiter from her neck. The surgery significantly affected her speaking and singing voice, and she had to seek the help of therapists and vocal coaches in order to recover her vocal health. After four years of restoring her vocal resources, she returned to the stage in 2011 as Pseudolus in Stephen Sondheim's A Funny Thing Happened on the Way to the Forum in Wichita.

Burns was awarded an honorary doctorate in 2016 from Wichita State. She resided in Wichita and was active as a performer in regional theatre productions up until 2020.

== Death ==
Burns died in Wichita on June 4, 2021, following a series of strokes, at the age of 66.

== Awards and honors ==
- Nominated for the Tony Award for Featured Actress in a Musical for the 1982–83 season for Show Boat.
- Won the Drama Desk Award for the role of Queenie in Show Boat in 1983.
- Received the Olivier Award in 1991 for her role as Queenie in Show Boat.
- Received the Kansas Governor's Arts Award for Individual Achievement as an Artist in 1991.
- Received the Kansas African American Museum Trailblazer Award in 2000.
- Named one of the top forty faces that changed Wichita State University in the millennium.
- Received the Wichita Arts Council Award for Performance and Education in 2012.
- December 17 through December 24 was declared "Karla Burns Week" in the city of Wichita by mayor Carl Brewer in 2013.
- A 2016 inductee to the Wichita State University Fine Arts Hall of Fame, and received an honorary doctorate from this university in the same year.

== Recordings ==
- Songs of New York (1984)
- Jerome Kern: Show Boat (1988), conducted by John McGlinn, EMI (1988)
- Cole Porter: Kiss Me Kate, with the London Sinfonietta, EMI (1990, as Hattie)
- Karla Burns...A Spiritual Mosaic (1998)
- Karla Burns and Earnest Alexander – A Christmas Celebration (2001)
- Burns by Request (2004)
- La Burns ... A Red Hot Momma's Tribute, with Mark Foley, JC Combs and Bill Thompson (2005)
