= Kim Criswell =

American musical entertainer and actress

- Born: July 19, 1957 (age 68); Hampton, Virginia, U.S.
- Education: University of Cincinnati (BFA)
- Occupations: Musical entertainer; actress
- Known for: Soloist at The Proms
- Notable work: One-woman show Doin What Comes Naturally

Kim Criswell (born July 19, 1957) is an American musical entertainer and actress.

== Life and career ==
Criswell was born in Hampton, Virginia, United States, and grew up in Chattanooga, Tennessee. After she graduated from Hixson High School in suburban Chattanooga, she studied musical theatre at the University of Cincinnati's College Conservatory of Music. She then moved to New York City where she landed a role in the touring company of Annie. She made her Broadway debut in The First in 1981. She has been in numerous musicals and has appeared with some of America's leading symphony orchestras as the featured soloist. She won the Helen Hayes Award in 1989 for her 1988 performance in Side By Side By Sondheim at the Olney Theatre in Washington.

In September 1991, she presented her one-woman show Doin What Comes Naturally, at the Shaw Theatre in London. She has lived in London since 1992, when she was invited to play Annie Oakley in Irving Berlin's musical Annie Get Your Gun.

On August 1, 2009, she was a featured soloist in the "BBC Proms 2009: a Celebration of Classic MGM Film Musicals" at the Royal Albert Hall. On that evening she performed a number of songs including: "The Trolley Song", "Over the Rainbow" and "Get Happy" all originally made famous by Judy Garland. She additionally performed the songs "I Got Rhythm" (also in Garland's repertoire) and "Who Wants to Be a Millionaire" in a duet with Seth MacFarlane. On October 4, 2009, she was a featured artist at the Broadway to West End Gala in the Theatre Royal Drury Lane. She repeated her Proms Concert success when she appeared in a Rodgers and Hammerstein evening, once again with the John Wilson Orchestra at The Royal Albert Hall with opera singer Rod Gilfry in August 2010.

In January 2012, she performed at Vienna's Volksoper, starring in Bernstein's Candide.

== Musicals ==
- The First (1981) as Hilda/ensemble
- Nine (1982) as Francesca (also as Claudia-first replacement)
- Baby (1983) as Narrator/Sixth Woman
- Jesus Christ Superstar at Paper Mill Playhouse as Mary Magdalene
- Cats (1985-1986 LA Production) as Grizabella
- Stardust (1986) as Soloist
- Three Musketeers (1983) as Queen Anne
- Side By Side By Sondheim (1988)
- The Threepenny Opera (1989) at Lunt Fontanne Theatre, Broadway as Lucy Brown
- Annie Get Your Gun (1992) at Prince Of Wales Theatre, London as Annie Oakley
- I Married an Angel at Theatre Off Park as Peggy
- Dames at Sea (1996) as Mona Kent
- The Slow Drag (1997) as June Wedding
- Of Thee I Sing (1998) as Diana Deaveraux
- Wonderful Town (1999) as Ruth Sherwood
- Hollywood and Broadway II - Herself, Bonnie Langford & Wayne Sleep - 1993
- Anything Goes (2002) at Grange Park Opera as Reno Sweeney
- Call Me Madam (2004) at Goodspeed Opera House as Mrs. Sally Adams
- Into The Woods (2006) as The Witch
- Candide (2006) at the Théâtre du Châtelet (Paris - France) as The Old Woman
- The Sound of Music (2009) at the Théâtre du Châtelet (Paris - France) as The Mother Abbess
- Hysteria (2011) as Mrs. Castellari
- Carrie (2015) at the Southwark Playhouse (London) as Margaret White

== Films ==
- The Man Who Made Husbands Jealous (1997) as Georgie Maguire

== Recordings ==
Title	Character
Side By Side (1988)	Soloist
Side By Side By Sondheim	Soloist (won the Helen Hayes Award!)
Annie	Star to be / Ensemble
Annie Get Your Gun (1992)	Annie Oakley
Anything Goes (studio recording)	Reno Sweeney
Baby (Dec 4, 1983)	Narrator, 6th woman, people in town
Dames At Sea (1996)	Ruby
Dubarry Was A Lady	
Elegies For Punks And Raging Queens (1993)	Soloist
The First (1981)	Girl at bat/Dodger wife/Hilda Chester
Gentlemen Prefer Blondes (May 1991)	Dorothy Shaw
Girl Crazy	Kate (?)
Glory Of Easter	Virgin Mary (Mary Magdalene for 1 performance)
Guys And Dolls	Miss Adelaide
The History Of The Musical by Richard Fawkes (Naxos Audiobooks)	Narrator
Kiss Me Kate	Lois Lane/Bianca
Lady Be Good (2000)	
Let Em Eat Cake (March 21, 1994)	Mary Turner
Man Of La Mancha (2000 Covent Garden Festival)	Aldonza / Dulcinea
Nine	Francesca, (U/S Claudia, Carla,)
Of Thee I Sing (June 27, 1998)	Diana Devereaux
On The Town	Hildy the taxi driver
One Touch Of Venus	
Sitting Pretty	
Slow Drag (1997)	June Wedding
Strike Up The Band	
Trouble in Tahiti (12 October 2008, BR Klassik 403571900300)	Dinah
Wonderful Town (1999)	Ruth

"Dearest Enemy" (2012)

Mary Murray

== Solo albums ==
- The Human Cry (1993)
- The Lorelei (1994)
- Back to Before (1999)
- Something to Dance About
