= Hear My Song =

1991 film by Peter Chelsom

- Theatrical release poster
- Directed by: Peter Chelsom
- Screenplay by: Peter Chelsom; Adrian Dunbar
- Story by: Peter Chelsom
- Produced by: Alison Owen-Allen
- Starring: Ned Beatty; Adrian Dunbar; Shirley Anne Field; Tara Fitzgerald; William Hootkins; David McCallum
- Cinematography: Sue Gibson
- Edited by: Martin Walsh
- Music by: John Altman
- Production companies: Limelight Productions; Film Four International; British Screen Productions; Windmill Lane Productions
- Distributed by: Miramax Films
- Release dates: 7 September 1991 (TIFF); 13 March 1992 (United Kingdom)
- Running time: 104 minutes
- Countries: Ireland; United Kingdom
- Language: English
- Budget: £2.1 million
- Box office: £739,989 (United Kingdom); $4.4 million (United States)

Hear My Song is a 1991 Irish-British comedy-drama film directed by Peter Chelsom, who co-wrote the screenplay with Adrian Dunbar, based on the story of Irish tenor Josef Locke. It was nominated for Best Original Screenplay at the 46th British Academy Film Awards in 1993.

The film stars Ned Beatty (song voice Vernon Midgley, as Locke), Adrian Dunbar, Shirley Anne Field, Tara Fitzgerald, William Hootkins and David McCallum (as police officer).

== Plot ==
Micky O'Neill tries to revive the fortunes of his Liverpool nightclub by promising his patrons he will present a performance by the legendary Irish tenor Josef Locke. After a series of unfortunate bookings (including Franc Cinatra, a Sinatra impersonator), Micky books the mysterious Mr. X, a man who insists he cannot be booked as Joe Locke due to the legal issues that would invariably ensue. The elusive Locke left the United Kingdom during the 1950s to avoid paying taxes, leaving behind "a beauty queen, a Jaguar sportscar, and a pedigree dalmatian, all of them pining". O'Neill's personal and professional life are left in ruin after beauty queen Cathleen Doyle exposes his Mr. X as a fraud. O'Neill returns to Ireland to find the true Josef Locke and bring him back.

== Cast ==
- Adrian Dunbar as Micky O'Neill
- Tara Fitzgerald as Nancy Doyle
- Ned Beatty as Jo Locke
- David McCallum as Jim Abbott
- Shirley Anne Field as Cathleen Doyle
- William Hootkins as Mr. X
- James Nesbitt as Fintan O'Donnell
- John Dair as Derek
- Stephen Marcus as Gordon
- Joe Cuddy as Franc Cinatra
- Vernon Midgley as the singing voice of Jo Locke

== Reception ==
Hear My Song received positive reviews from critics, as the film holds a 90% rating on Rotten Tomatoes based on 29 reviews.

== Awards ==
- Nominated Best Original Screenplay BAFTA (Peter Chelsom, Adrian Dunbar)
- Nominated Best Original Score BAFTA (Anthony Asquith Award) (John Altman)
- Winner Best Comedy Film British Comedy Awards
- Winner Best Technical Achievement Evening Standard British Film Awards (Sue Gordon, director of photography)
- Winner Most Promising Newcomer Evening Standard British Film Awards (Peter Chelsom, screenwriter, director)
- Nominated Best Supporting Actor Golden Globe (Ned Beatty)
- Winner British Newcomer of the Year London Film Critics Circle (Peter Chelsom, screenwriter, director)
