= Funny Valentine (disambiguation) =

Funny Valentine is a 1998 album by the experimental power trio Massacre

Funny Valentine or Funny valentine may refer to:

- Funny Valentines, a 1999 television film
- "Funny Valentine" (Law & Order: Special Victims Unit), an episode
- Funny Valentine (JoJo's Bizarre Adventure), a character
- Funny valentine, a species of dictynid spider in the genus Funny

== See also ==
- My Funny Valentine (disambiguation)
