= Josef Locke =

Irish singer (1917–1999)

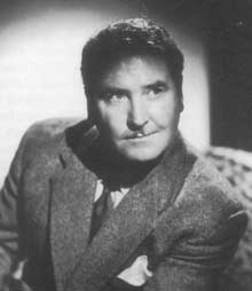
- McLaughlin, c. 1957
- Born: Joseph McLaughlin; 23 March 1917; Derry, Ireland
- Died: 15 October 1999 (aged 82); Clane, County Kildare, Ireland
- Other name: The Singing Bobby
- Occupation: Singer
- Years active: 1949–1992

Joseph McLaughlin (23 March 1917 – 15 October 1999), known professionally as Josef Locke, was an Irish tenor. He was successful in the United Kingdom and Ireland in the 1940s and 1950s.

== Background ==
Born in Derry, Ireland, he was the son of a butcher and cattle dealer, and one of nine children. He started singing in local churches in the Bogside at the age of seven, and as a teenager added two years to his age to enlist in the Irish Guards, later serving abroad with the Palestine Police Force, before returning in the late 1930s to join the Royal Ulster Constabulary.

== Career ==
Known as The Singing Bobby, he became a local celebrity before starting to work the UK variety circuit, where he also played summer seasons in English seaside resorts. The renowned Irish tenor John McCormack advised him that his voice was better suited to a lighter repertoire than the operatic one he had in mind, and urged him to find an agent—thus he found the noted impresario Jack Hylton who booked him, but could not fit his full name on the bill, thus Joseph McLaughlin became Josef Locke.

He made an immediate impact when featured in "Starry Way," a twenty-week summer show at the Blackpool Opera House in 1946 and was rebooked for the following summer, then starring for three seasons at the Blackpool Hippodrome. He appeared in ten Blackpool seasons from 1946 to 1969, not the nineteen seasons he later claimed.

He made his first radio broadcast in 1949, and subsequently appeared on television programmes such as Rooftop Rendezvous, Top of the Town, All-star Bill and The Frankie Howerd Show. He was signed to the Columbia label in 1947, and his first releases were the two Italian songs "Santa Lucia" and "Come Back to Sorrento".

=== Success ===
In 1947, Locke released "Hear My Song, Violetta," which became forever associated with him. It was based on a 1936 tango "Hör' mein Lied, Violetta" by Othmar Klose and Rudolf Lukesch. The song "Hör' mein Lied, Violetta" was often covered, including by Peter Alexander and was itself based on Giuseppe Verdi's La Traviata.

Locke's other songs were mostly a mixture of ballads associated with Ireland ("I'll Take You Home Again, Kathleen", "Dear Old Donegal", "Galway Bay", "The Isle of Innisfree", the theme song from the film The Quiet Man, and another Dick Farrelly song, "The Rose of Slievenamon") excerpts from operettas (including "The Drinking Song" from The Student Prince, "My Heart and I" from Richard Tauber's operetta Old Chelsea, and "Goodbye" from The White Horse Inn) and familiar favourites such as "I'll Walk Beside You," "Come Back to Sorrento," and "Cara Mia."

In 1948, he appeared in several films produced by Mancunian Films, usually as versions of himself. He plays himself in the film Holidays with Pay. He also appears as "Sergeant Locke" in the 1949 comedy What a Carry On!.

In 1958, after he had appeared in five Royal Variety Performances, and while he was still at the peak of his career, the British tax authorities began to make substantial demands that Locke declined to meet. Eventually he fled the country for Ireland, where he lay low for several years. When his differences with the taxman were eventually settled, Locke relaunched his career in England with tours of the northern variety clubs and summer seasons at Blackpool's Queen's Theatre in 1968 and 1969, before retiring to County Kildare, emerging for the occasional concert in England. He later appeared on British and Irish television, and in November 1984 was given a lengthy 90-minute tribute in honour of the award he was to be receiving at the Olympia theatre commemorating his career in show business on Gay Byrne's The Late Late Show. Locke also made many appearances on the BBC TV's long running variety show The Good Old Days.

=== Hear My Song ===
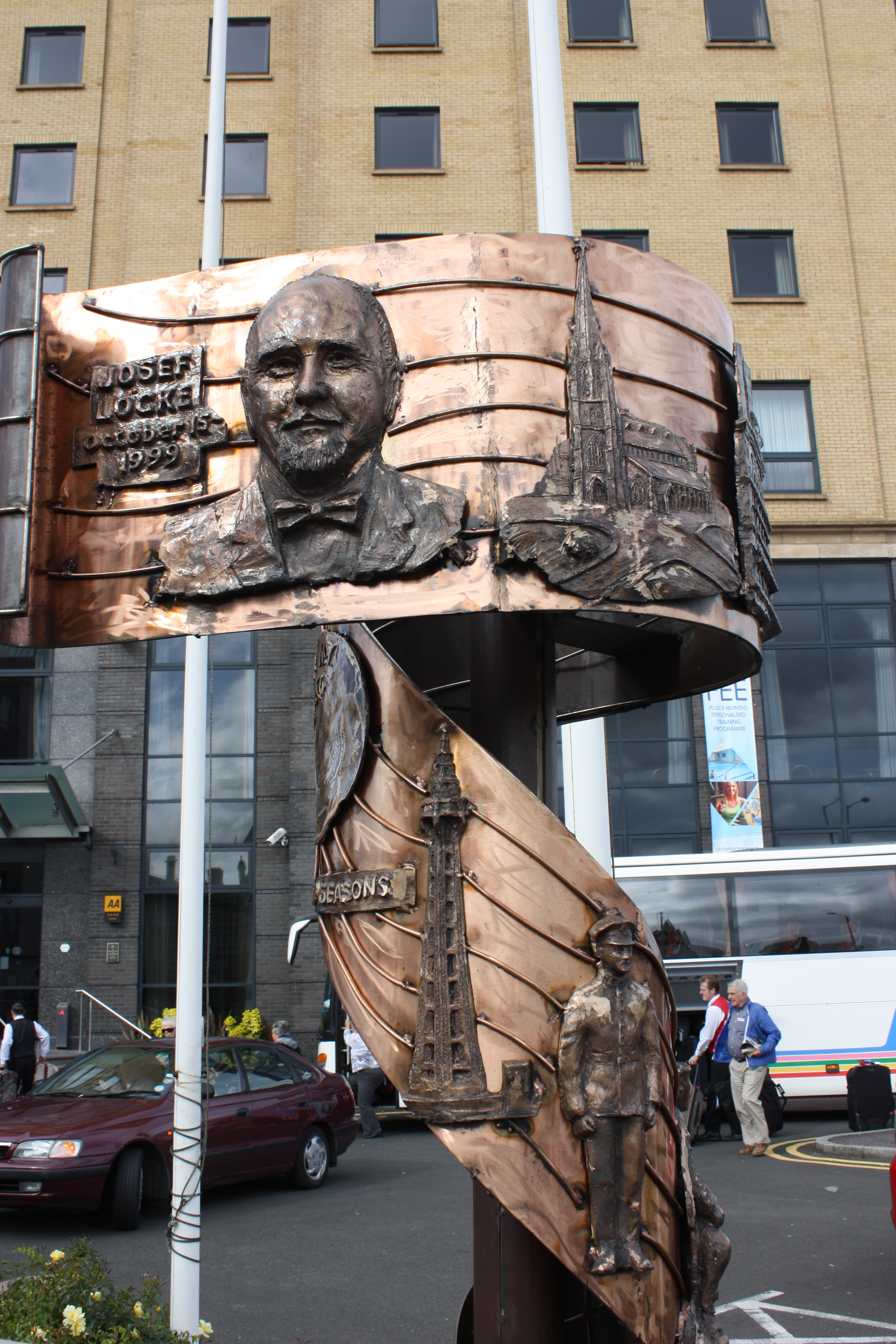
Josef Locke memorial in Derry

In 1991, the Peter Chelsom film Hear My Song was released. It is a fantasy based on the notion of Locke returning from his Irish exile in the 1960s to complete an old love affair, and save a Liverpool-based Irish night-club from ruination. Locke is played by Ned Beatty, with the singing voice of Vernon Midgley.

The film led to a revival in Locke's career. A compilation CD was released and he appeared on This Is Your Life in March 1992. He performed in front of the Prince and Princess of Wales at the 1992 Royal Variety Show, singing "Goodbye", the final song performed by his character in the film. He had announced before the song that this would be his final public appearance.

== Personal life ==
An inveterate gambler and tax avoider, Locke had to flee the UK when the Inland Revenue issued a warrant for his arrest for non-payment of taxes. Thereafter, Locke lived in County Kildare, Ireland. He died on 15 October 1999 and was survived by his wife, Carmel, and a son.

== Memorial ==
On 22 March 2005, a bronze memorial to Locke was unveiled outside the City Hotel on Queen's Quay in Derry by Phil Coulter and John Hume. The memorial was designed by Terry Quigley. It takes the form of a spiraling scroll divided by lines, representing a musical stave. The spiral suggests the flowing melody of a song, and is punctuated by images illustrating episodes in his life, including Locke in police uniform, Blackpool Tower, Carnegie Hall, and the musical notes of the opening lines of "Hear My Song".

A biography of the singer, entitled Josef Locke: The People's Tenor, by Nuala McAllister Hart was published in March 2017, the centenary of his birth. The book corrects many myths that the charismatic Locke circulated about his career.
