= Vernon Midgley =

English singer

Vernon Midgley (born 28 May 1940) is an English tenor.

== Life and career ==
Midgley was born in Worcester Park, Surrey. His parents were the tenor Walter Midgley and the pianist Gladys Midgley. His sister is the soprano Maryetta Midgley.

He was educated at Bishop's Stortford College and the Royal Academy of Music, where he studied music and the piano as a Sisselle Way Scholar.

He first worked as an entomologist at the Ministry of Agriculture, Fisheries and Food Pest infestation Headquarters at Tolworth, Surrey.

He began broadcasting in Lights of London in 1971. and he has sung with the Ambrosian Opera Chorus and with most of the military and brass bands in Britain. He has sung in many full-length opera and operettas on BBC Radio 3, and he has also performed on BBC Radio 2 in Grand Hotel, Ring Up the Curtain, Among Your Souvenirs, Your Hundred Best Tunes, Baker's Dozen, Glamorous Nights, Friday Night is Music Night, Melodies for You and Walter Midgley Remembers. He appeared frequently on BBC TV's long running variety show The Good Old Days with his sister Maryetta.

For some considerable time in the early 1960s he played Freddie in the stage production of My Fair Lady at Drury Lane. In the United States, he is perhaps best known as the singing voice of Josef Locke, who was played by Ned Beatty in the film Hear My Song.

Midgley is married to the New Zealand soprano Alexandra Gordon, with one son and one daughter. He teaches voice at the National Academy of Singing and Dramatic Arts at Ara Institute of Canterbury, New Zealand.

He is featured, with his sister Maryetta, on the song "Witness to a Murder (Part Two)" on Mansun's 1998 album Six.

== Discography ==
- Jerome Kern: Show Boat, conducted by John McGlinn, EMI, 1988
- Melodies Melodies All The Way, Maryetta and Vernon Midgley, orchestra of romance conducted by Harold Geller, produced by Bob Bowman. Philips International Series vinyl album 6382 113
- Maryetta and Vernon Midgley At Your Request with Gladys Midgley pianoforte, recording director John L Timperley, produced by Daniel Smeeton, MVM Records vinyl album Stereo MVM 1124
- Maryetta and Vernon Midgley Hosanna with The Ambrosian Singers, chorus master John McCarthy, organ William Davis, recording director John L Timperley, MVM Records vinyl album MVM 5560 Stereo

== Sources ==
- Gritten, David, "Locke Sings a Different Tune", Los Angeles Times, 5 March 1992
- International Who's Who in Music and Musicians' Directory. 10th edition. Cambridge, England: International Who's Who in Music, 1984.
- University of Canterbury, Faculty biography: Vernon Midgley (accessed 28 January 2010)
