= Magdalena Midgley =

British archaeologist

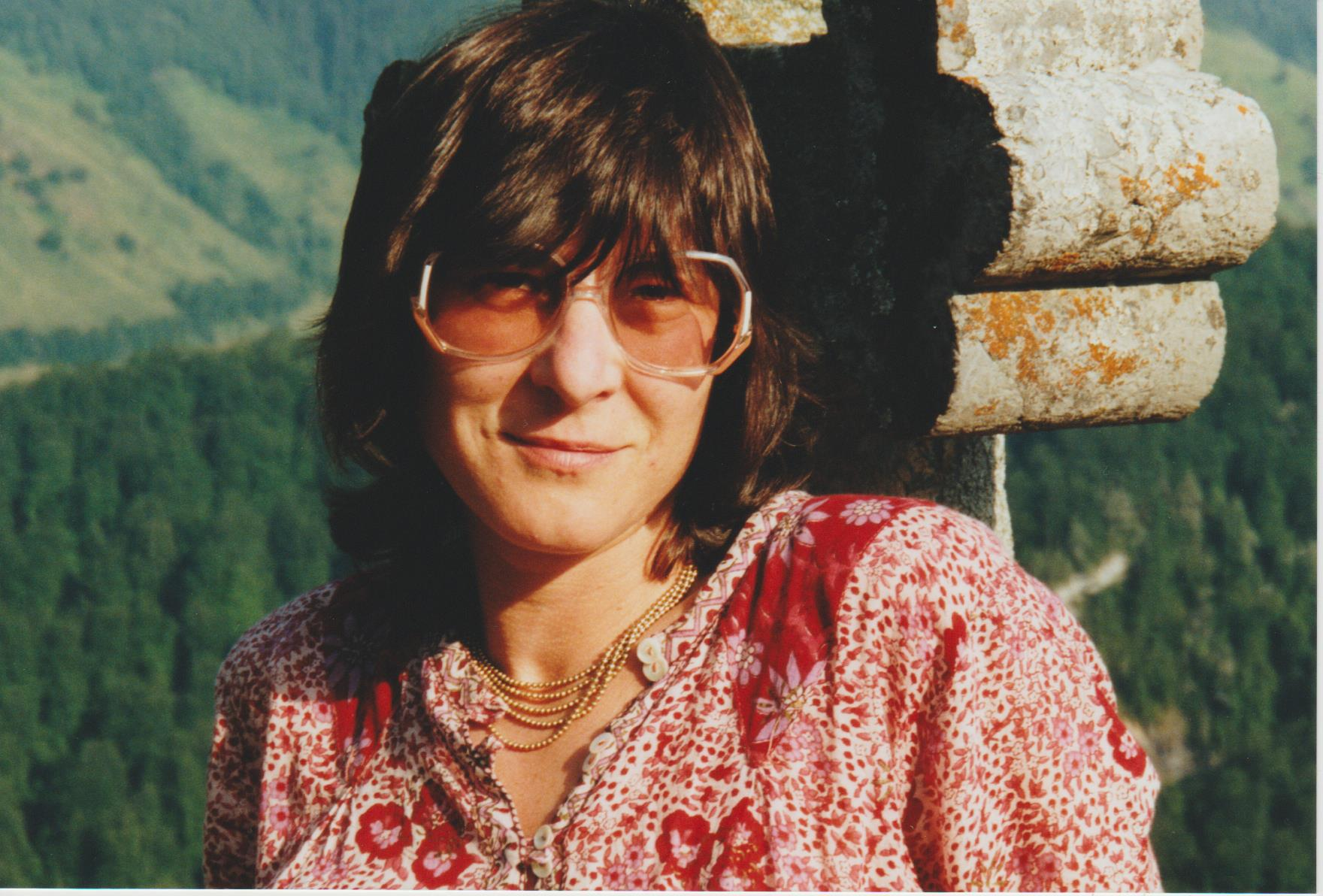
- Midgley at Lescun, France, 1990
- Born: 4 November 1952; Bydgoszcz, Pomerania, Poland
- Died: 21 July 2014 (aged 61); Biggar, Edinburgh, Scotland

Academic background
- Education: University of Edinburgh

Academic work
- Era: 20th century
- Notable ideas: Neolithic Scotland TRB culture

Magdalena Midgley (4 November 1952 – 21 July 2014) was a British archaeologist, and Professor of the European Neolithic at the University of Edinburgh. She dedicated her archaeological career to teaching and researching early farming cultures of Continental Europe. She became known for her survey of the TRB culture (Funnel(-neck-)beaker culture), the first farming culture of the North European Plain and southern Scandinavia, which was published by Edinburgh University Press.

== Biography ==
=== Early life ===
Magdalena Stefania Midgley (née Kedzierska) was born in 1952 in Bydgoszcz, Poland. Daughter of Stefan Janusz Kedzierski, a Polish Air Force pilot, and Zofia Maria Appelt, she was brought up by her grandparents Bruno and Bronislawa Appelt.

In 1972 she went to Scotland to visit relatives and develop her English language skills. There she met her future husband, Stephen Midgley, a teacher of modern languages. The couple married in May 1973.

=== Education ===
After completing her Scottish Highers at Stevenson College Midgley enrolled at the University of Edinburgh in 1974, where she studied Archaeology under Professor Stuart Piggott and was awarded an Honours Degree in Archaeology in 1978. . By this time she had developed a special interest in the Neolithic period, and in 1985 she completed her Doctoral Thesis on the earthen long barrows of northern Europe.

=== Academic career ===
In 1989 Midgley was appointed Lecturer in the University of Edinburgh's then-named Department of Prehistoric Archaeology. She was appointed as an Academic Advisor in Archaeology, and in 1992 contributed to organising the Certificate in Archaeology. From 1994 she directed the Centre for Continuing Education's Summer School in Archaeology. Midgley was a leading figure in the development of the University of Edinburgh Access courses, providing mature-aged enrolments for undergraduate studies. She was also Quality Assurance Adviser to the Arts Faculty Group for several years in the mid-1990s. She was promoted to Senior Lecturer in 1997, and appointed Professor of the European Neolithic in 2013.

Throughout her career, she participated in numerous excavations of prehistoric sites, beginning in her student days in the United Kingdom, and later leading projects spanning the Czech Republic, France, Scotland and Denmark.

In her later years, before her final illness, she was working on two projects: firstly, a development of her earlier study of the TRB culture in the light of recent discoveries and theories; and secondly, a study of the early antiquarians, the emergence of the discipline of Archaeology and its relationship with, and influence on, the artists and writers of the Romantic movement.

=== Death ===
Midgley was diagnosed with cancer in 2013. She died at Kello Hospital, Biggar on 21 July 2014. In 2015 she was posthumously appointed Professor Emerita by the University of Edinburgh.

== Selected Publications ==
- "The Origin and Function of the Earthen Long Barrows of Northern Europe" (British Archaeological Reports International Series 259, Oxford 1985)
- "TRB Culture. The First Farmers of the North European Plain" (Edinburgh University Press, Edinburgh 1992)
- "The Monumental Cemeteries of Prehistoric Europe" (Tempus Publishing, Stroud 2005)
- "The Megaliths of Northern Europe" (Routledge, Abingdon 2008)
- Midgley, M. 2009. From Antiquarianism to Phenomenology: the Study of Landscape in Later 19th and Early 19th Century Britain. In Landscapes and Human Development: the contribution of European Archaeology.

Numerous articles, papers, chapters and other contributions to journals and collective works.
