= Ambrosian Singers =

British choral group

- Origin: London, England
- Genres: Renaissance; Medieval; Operatic
- Years active: 1951–present
- Past members: Heather Harper; Dorothy Dorow; Janet Baker; Sarah Walker; Margaret Price; Robert Tear; Ian Partridge; John Shirley-Quirk; Edgar Fleet (Tenor)

The Ambrosian Singers are an English choral group based in London.

== History ==
They were founded after World War II in England. One of their co-founders was Denis Stevens (1922–2004), a British musicologist and viola player who joined the BBC Music Department in 1949 and developed programs of Renaissance and early Baroque music. Stevens conducted them from 1956 to 1960. The other was John McCarthy (1919–2009), a professional tenor soloist. McCarthy continued to conduct them until the late 1980s. During the 1960s the choir called on the services of between 600 and 700 singers.

They organised and created the Ambrosian Singers as a small professional chorus in 1951, initially to sing polyphonic choruses for renaissance and medieval pieces for The History of Music series. However, their repertoire greatly expanded afterwards. Depending on the style to be sung and on the occasion, they may go by the names "the Ambrosian Light Opera Chorus", "the Ambrosian Chorus", the "Ambrosian Choir" or "London Symphony Orchestra Chorus". In 1956 a six-singer group was founded within the Ambrosian Singers called "the Ambrosian Consort", specialising in the singing of Renaissance music in period languages.

The Ambrosian singers have been the training ground for a large number of professional artists. Famous members have included Heather Harper, Dorothy Dorow, Janet Baker, Sarah Walker, Margaret Price, Robert Tear, Ian Partridge and John Shirley-Quirk.

Ambrosian Singers have participated in numerous Christmas albums, appeared in albums with such pop and rock artists as Neil Diamond, Grace Jones, Talk Talk, Julie Andrews, etc., and sung in several studio cast albums of Broadway musicals. They have participated in various film soundtrack scores such as Brainstorm, Empire of the Sun, Krull, Chariots of Fire, Children of the Stones and The Secret of NIMH, and in some albums of Italian films: Film Scores of Ennio Morricone and Nino Rota (conducted by Henry Mancini, collections of Miklos Rozsa scores, and original scores from MGM classic musicals. They did the introduction vocals for the song "Inside" by Stiltskin in 1994. They also were the chorus that sang Mozart's Requiem in the film Amadeus. In 1962, the Ambrosian Singers also recorded as the Norman Luboff Choir for the RCA Victor album "Inspiration" with the New Symphony Orchestra of London conducted by Leopold Stokowski.

== Show Boat controversy ==
In 1987, the Ambrosian Singers took part in John McGlinn's recording of Show Boat, an album performed by singers drawn from the worlds of both opera and popular music. The recording invited controversy, as the lyrics of the original 1927 score used by McGlinn included the racially offensive word "nigger". Originally an all-black British choir had been intended to sing the "black" roles in the musical, but they had walked out after discovering the content of the lyrics that they were going to be required to sing. As a consequence, the Ambrosian Singers sang both the "white" and the "black" parts of the musical. The recording was arranged by EMI who "didn't care they were white". The recording went on to be a critical and commercial success, leading to other opera singers' being invited to perform pieces from Broadway musicals.

== Involvement in opera ==
The Ambrosian Singers are also called the Ambrosian Opera Chorus, or the Ambrosian Chorus, or the Ambrosian Choir. The ensemble has made numerous recordings of complete operas under various noted conductors including Zubin Mehta, Carlo Maria Giulini, Claudio Abbado, Lamberto Gardelli, Nello Santi, Julius Rudel, Georges Prêtre and many more. From 1961 to 1966, when McCarthy was a choral director of the London Symphony Orchestra, the Ambrosian Singers were known as the London Symphony Orchestra Chorus.

Under various names (Ambrosian Singers, Ambrosian Opera Chorus, Ambrosian Chorus, Ambrosian Choir, London Symphony Orchestra Chorus or The John McCarthy Singers), the ensemble has appeared in various type of recording albums with many renowned operatic singers, recording recitals, sacred music, selected arias and complete operas with Montserrat Caballé, Joan Sutherland, Kiri Te Kanawa, Luciano Pavarotti, Plácido Domingo, José Carreras and many more.

Their singing style has been described variously as "stylish", nimble, and "like an obedient battalion".

== Selected operatic discography ==
Year	Composer, Opera	Cast	Conductor, Opera House and Orchestra	Label				
1964	Bellini: Beatrice di Tenda	Joan Sutherland, Cornelius Opthof, Luciano Pavarotti, et al.	Richard Bonynge, London Symphony Orchestra; Ambrosian Opera Chorus	Audio CD: Decca; Cat:				
1966	Rossini: Semiramide	Joan Sutherland, Marilyn Horne, Joseph Rouleau, et al.	Richard Bonynge, London Symphony Orchestra; Ambrosian Opera Chorus	Audio CD: Decca; Cat:				
1966	Gounod: Faust	Joan Sutherland, Franco Corelli, Nicolai Ghiaurov, et al.	Richard Bonynge, London Symphony Orchestra; Ambrosian Opera Chorus	Audio CD: Decca; Cat:				
1969	Verdi: La forza del destino	Martina Arroyo, Carlo Bergonzi, Piero Cappuccilli, et al.	Lamberto Gardelli, Royal Philharmonic Orchestra; Ambrosian Opera Chorus	Audio CD: EMI; Cat:				
	Donizetti: Roberto Devereux	Beverly Sills, Róbert Ilosfalvy, Peter Glossop, Beverly Wolff	Charles Mackerras; Royal Philharmonic Orchestra; Ambrosian Opera Chorus	Audio CD: Westminster; Cat:				
	Verdi: Il trovatore	Plácido Domingo, Sherrill Milnes, Leontyne Price, et al.	Zubin Mehta; New Philharmonia Orchestra; Ambrosian Chorus	Audio CD: RCA; Cat: 6194-2; Cat: 86194				
1970	Verdi: Don Carlos	Plácido Domingo, Montserrat Caballé, Sherill Milnes, et al.	Carlo Maria Giulini; Orchestra of the Royal Opera House, Covent Garden; Ambrosian Chorus	Audio CD: Angel Records; Cat: 47701				
	Donizetti: L'elisir d'amore	Joan Sutherland, Luciano Pavarotti, Spiro Malas, et al.	Richard Bonynge; English Chamber Orchestra; Ambrosian Chorus	Audio CD: Angel Records; Cat: 47701				
	Donizetti: Lucia di Lammermoor	Beverly Sills, Carlo Bergonzi, Piero Cappuccilli, Justino Diaz	Thomas Schippers; London Symphony Orchestra; Ambrosian Opera Chorus	Audio CD: Westminster; Cat:				
	Massenet: Manon	Beverly Sills, Nicolai Gedda, Gérard Souzay, Gabriel Bacquier	Julius Rudel; New Philharmonia Orchestra; Ambrosian Opera Chorus	Audio CD: EMI; Cat: Deutsche Grammophon; Cat:				
1971	Verdi: I Lombardi alla prima crociata	Plácido Domingo, Cristina Deutekom, Ruggero Raimondi, et al.	Lamberto Gardelli; Royal Philharmonic Orchestra; Ambrosian Singers	Audio CD: Philips; Cat: 422 420–2				
	Puccini: Manon Lescaut	Montserrat Caballé, Plácido Domingo, Vincente Sardinero, et al.	Bruno Bartoletti (Studio); New Philharmonia Orchestra; Ambrosian Opera Chorus	Audio CD: EMI Classic; Cat: 7 47736-8				
	Verdi: Rigoletto	Luciano Pavarotti, Sherrill Milnes, Joan Sutherland, et al.	Richard Bonynge, London Symphony Orchestra; Ambrosian Opera Chorus	Audio CD: Decca; Cat: 414–269–2				
	Rossini: Il Barbiere di Siviglia	Hermann Prey, Teresa Berganza, Luigi Alva, Enzo Dara, Paolo Montarsolo	Claudio Abbado; London Symphony Orchestra; Ambrosian Singers	Audio CD: Deutsche Grammophon; Cat:				
1972	Bellini: Norma	Plácido Domingo, Montserrat Caballé, Fiorenza Cossotto, et al.	Carlo Felice Cillario; London Philharmonic Orchestra; Ambrosian Singers	Audio CD: RCA; Cat: 6502-2; Cat: 8650				
	Verdi: Atila	Ruggero Raimondi, Carlo Bergonzi, Christina Deutekom, et al.	Lamberto Gardelli, Royal Philharmonic Orchestra, Ambrosian Singers	Audio CD: Philips; Cat: 412–875–2				
	Verdi: Giovanna d'Arco	Montserrat Caballé, Plácido Domingo, Sherrill Milnes, et al.	James Levine; London Symphony Orchestra; Ambrosian Opera Chorus	Audio CD: EMI Classics; Cat: 63226-2; Angel Records; Cat: 63226				
1973	Boito: Mefistofele	Plácido Domingo, Norman Treigle, Montserrat Caballé, et al.	Julius Rudel (Studio); London Symphony Orchestra; Ambrosian Singers	Audio CD: Angel; Cat: 49522; EMI; Cat: 49522-2				
	Bellini: I Puritani	Beverly Sills, Nicolai Gedda, Louis Quilico, Paul Plishka	Julius Rudel; London Philharmonic Orchestra, Ambrosian Opera Chorus	Audio CD: Westminster The Legacy; Cat: 471 207–2				
1975	Massenet: La Navarraise	Plácido Domingo, Sherrill Milnes, Marilyn Horne, et al.	Henry Lewis; London Symphony Orchestra; Ambrosian Opera Chorus	Audio CD: RCA Victor; Cat: 50167				
1976	Montemezzi: L'amore dei tre re	Plácido Domingo, Pablo Elvira, Elizabeth Bainbridge, et al.	Nello Santi, London Symphony Orchestra; Ambrosian Opera Chorus	Audio CD: RCA; Cat: 50166				
	Charpentier: Louise	Ileana Cotrubas, Plácido Domingo, Gabriel Bacquier, et al.	Georges Prêtre; New Philharmonia Orchestra; Ambrosian Singers	Audio CD: Sony Classical; Cat: 46429				
	Puccini: Il Trittico (Il tabarro / Gianni Schicchi)	Plácido Domingo, Renata Scotto, Ileana Cotrubas, et al.	Lorin Maazel; London Symphony Orchestra; Ambrosian Opera Chorus	Audio CD: CBS; Cat: 35912; Cat: 79312				
	Puccini: Tosca	Plácido Domingo, Raina Kabaivanska, Sherrill Milnes, et al.	Bruno Bartoletti (Film); New Philharmonia Orchestra; Ambrosian Singers	DVD: Deutsche Grammophon; Cat: 00440 073 4038				
1977	Cilea: Adriana Lecouvreur	Plácido Domingo, Renata Scotto, Sherrill Milnes, et al.	James Levine (Studio); Philharmonia Orchestra; Ambrosian Singers	Audio CD: Sony Classical; Cat: 34588; CBS; Cat: 79310				
	Thomas: Mignon	Marilyn Horne, Frederica von Stade, Alain Vanzo, Ruth Welting, Nicola Zaccaria, et al.	Antonio de Almeida; Philharmonia Orchestra; Ambrosian Opera Chorus	Audio CD: Sony Classical; Cat: SM3K 34590; For details, see Mignon (Antonio de Almeida recording)				
	Verdi: Otello	Plácido Domingo, Renata Scotto, Sherrill Milnes, et al.	James Levine; National Philharmonic Orchestra; Ambrosian singers	Audio CD: RCA; Cat: 2951; Cat: 82951-2				
	Bizet: Carmen	Teresa Berganza, Plácido Domingo, Ileana Cotrubas, et al.	Claudio Abbado; London Symphony Orchestra; Ambrosian Singers	Audio CD: Deutsche Grammophon; Cat: 427 885–2				
1978	Mascagni: Cavalleria Rusticana	Plácido Domingo, Pablo Elvira, Renata Scotto, et al.	James Levine (Studio); National Philharmonic Orchestra; Ambrosian Opera Chorus	Audio CD: RCA; Cat: 83091; BMG Classics; Cat: 74321 39500 2 Brilliant Classics; Cat: 6251				
	Puccini: Madama Butterfly	Plácido Domingo, Renata Scotto, Ingvar Wixell, et al.	Lorin Maazel (Studio); London Philharmonia Orchestra; Ambrosian Opera Chorus	Audio CD: CBS; Cat: 35181; Sony; Cat: 91135 Puccini: [Madama Butterfly] /Mirella Freni, Jose Carreras, Teresa Bergnza, etc. /Ambrosian Opera Chorus/Philharmonia Orchestra/Giuseppe Sinopoli /1988 Polydor International Gmbh, Hamburg	Verdi: Nabucco	Matteo Manuguerra, Veriano Luchetti; Nicolai Ghiaurov; Renata Scotto, Elena Obraztsova	Riccardo Muti; Philharmonia Orchestra; Ambrosian Opera Chorus	Audio CD: CBS, Cat: 4564472; EMI; The Opera Series
	Donizetti: Don Pasquale	Beverly Sills, Donald Gramm, Alfredo Kraus, Alan Titus	Sarah Caldwell; London Symphony Orchestra; Ambrosian Opera Chorus	Audio CD: EMI; Cat:				
1978	Massenet: Cendrillon	Frederica von Stade, Nicolai Gedda, Ruth Welting, Jane Berbié, Jules Bastin	Julius Rudel; Philharmonia Orchestra; Ambrosian Opera Chorus	Audio CD: Sony Classical; Cat: M2K 79323; For details, see Cendrillon (Julius Rudel recording)				
1979	Puccini: Le Villi	Plácido Domingo, Renata Scotto, Leo Nucci, et al.	Lorin Maazel; National Philharmonic Orchestra; Ambrosian Opera Chorus	Audio CD: CBS; Cat: 36669; Cat: 76890				
1979	Rossini: William Tell	Sherrill Milnes, Luciano Pavarotti, Mirella Freni, et al.	Riccardo Chailly; National Philharmonic Orchestra; Ambrosian Opera Chorus	Audio CD: Decca; Cat: 4757723				
1980	Puccini: Tosca	Plácido Domingo, Renato Bruson, Renato Capecchi, et al.	James Levine (Studio); Philharmonia Orchestra; Ambrosian Opera Chorus	Audio CD: Angel; Cat: 49364; EMI; Cat: 49364-2				
1982	Puccini: La rondine	Plácido Domingo, Kiri Te Kanawa, Leo Nucci, et al.	Lorin Maazel; London Symphony Orchestra; Ambrosian Chorus	Audio CD: CBS; Cat: M2K-37852				
1985	Verdi: La forza del destino	Rosalind Plowright, José Carreras, Renato Bruson, et al.	Giuseppe Sinopoli, Philharmonia Orchestra; Ambrosian Opera Chorus	Audio CD:Deutsche Grammophon; Cat:				

Note: "Cat:" is short for catalogue number by the label company.

== Musical theatre discography ==
- Jerome Kern: Show Boat, conducted by John McGlinn; EMI Records, 1988
- Cole Porter: Anything Goes, conducted by John McGlinn; EMI Records, 1989
- Richard Rodgers: My Funny Valentine: Frederica von Stade sings Rodgers and Hart, conducted by John McGlinn; EMI Records, 1990
