= Hans Spialek =

Austrian-born American composer and orchestrator

Hans Spialek in 1983

Hans Spialek (April 17, 1894 – November 20, 1983) was an Austrian-born American composer and orchestrator. Raised in Vienna and given an early musical education, he continued his studies in Moscow, at first as a prisoner of war during World War I, before settling in the US in 1924.

Spialek is best known for scoring the music for Broadway musicals by Cole Porter, Rodgers and Hart and others, as well as ballet music, and radio broadcasts. He orchestrated 147 musicals from 1926 to 1967, many in collaboration with other arrangers such as Robert Russell Bennett. In his retirement in the 1980s, he helped reconstruct the original orchestrations for recordings of some of his 1930s Broadway shows.

== Life and career ==
=== Early life and peak years ===
Spialek was born in Vienna, where he received a musical education. He sang in the children's chorus of the Vienna State Opera and played small roles, including the little boy in the second act of La bohème under the baton of Gustav Mahler. He studied composing and conducting at the Vienna Conservatory, before fighting in the First World War. He was taken prisoner by Russian forces, but was allowed to continue his musical studies, and he conducted a prisoners’ orchestra. After the war he studied in Moscow with Reinhold Glière.

In 1924, Spialek and his wife, the singer Dora Boshoer, moved to America, where he joined the music staff of publisher Chappell Music. His Broadway debut was in 1926, orchestrating some of Walter Donaldson and Joseph Meyer's music for Sweetheart Time (1926). At Chappell, he shared an office with Robert Russell Bennett, with whom he collaborated on dozens of shows. Over the next 22 years, Spialek arranged the music for more than 100 Broadway musicals, and by the time of his retirement in 1957 he had worked on a total of 147.

Among the shows from the 1920s on which Spialek worked are Rosalie (1928), The New Moon (1928) and Fifty Million Frenchmen (1929). His many shows from the 1930s include The New Yorkers (1930), Gay Divorce (1932), Anything Goes (1934), On Your Toes (1936), Babes in Arms (1937), I Married an Angel (1938) and The Boys from Syracuse (1938). His 1940s shows include Pal Joey (1940), Panama Hattie (1940), Something for the Boys (1943), Are You with It? (1945), and Where's Charley? (1948).

Music historian Thomas Hischak has written of Spialek that perhaps his greatest contribution "was the modern ballet orchestrations he made of Richard Rodgers' music for "Slaughter on Tenth Avenue" and the "Princess Zenobia" ballet in On Your Toes, the "Big Brother" ballet in The Boys From Syracuse, and "Peter's Journey" ballet in Babes in Arms." In the Grove Dictionary of Music and Musicians, George J. Ferencz writes of Spialek, "His theatre orchestrations are distinguished by their wittiness, frequent text-painting and masterful use of minimum resources."

=== Later years ===
From the 1940s, Spialek worked less for Broadway; he had written music for the 1939 World's Fair, and over the next years he composed and conducted for radio and entertainment events at trade expositions and civic pageants. His last new theatre work was on a 1967 musical, Mata Hari. In retirement, Spialek accepted invitations from the conductors John Mauceri and John McGlinn to reconstruct his original 1930s scoring for recordings of On Your Toes and Anything Goes, which, in Ferencz's words, "earned the adulation of a new generation of theatre scholars and enthusiasts." McGlinn wrote of him, "Spialek genuinely loved this music and loved getting the most out of it. His orchestrations are uniquely transparent and kind to singers – never covering, always supporting, and full of sly humour (he was, beyond doubt, the funniest man I've ever met)."

In addition to his work as an arranger, Spialek wrote and published some original works of his own. They include the orchestral suite The Tall City (1933); an orchestral Sinfonietta (1936); and Manhattan Watercolors ("An Orchestral Entertainment", 1937).

Spialek died in New York at the age of 89.
