= Walter Midgley =

English opera singer (1912–1980)

Walter Midgley (13 September 1912 – 18 September 1980) was an English opera tenor who sang leading roles at the Royal Opera House and elsewhere from the 1930s to the 1950s.

== Early life ==
Midgley was born in Bramley, near Rotherham. After leaving school, he worked as a clerk in a steelworks in Sheffield while learning to play musical instruments and sing in choirs during his spare time. In order to earn enough to pay for singing lessons, he formed a dance band and eventually enrolled in the Sheffield School of Music.

== Career ==
Midgley auditioned for the Carl Rosa Opera Company and was engaged as a chorister, subsequently playing small parts and eventually making his debut as a principal in the role of Rodolfo in La bohème. Before World War II, he also sang with the Sadler's Wells company. He also sang with Geraldo on BBC Radio.

After the war, he became principal tenor at the Royal Opera House, Covent Garden, making his debut as Calaf in Turandot. He sang major tenor roles from 1951 to 1953, but left after a difference with the management and never returned.

On 31 December 1952, during Rigoletto at Covent Garden, while he was singing "Questa o quella", Midgley swallowed his false moustache. This incident made newspaper headlines all over the world. However, far from being amusing, it was worrying. He completed the first act and the opera house staff were able to retrieve some of the offending article in the interval, but the next day an operation to remove the gauze was needed. For him it was a case of 'the show must go on', but the accident caused him much discomfort for some months after.

== Personal life ==
He was married to the pianist Gladys Vernon, and their children Maryetta Midgley and Vernon Midgley became accomplished singers in their own right. He once appeared with his wife and children on the long-running BBC Radio programme Friday Night Is Music Night, the only occasion on which all four Midgleys were to perform together in public.

== Final work and death ==
He died in 1980 having that day completed another of his very popular BBC Radio 2 series, Walter Midgley Remembers.
