= Show Boat (1988 cast album) =

- EMI Records CD, CDRIVER 1

Studio album by John McGlinn
- Recorded: June 1 – August 31, 1987
- Studios: Studio No. 1, Abbey Road Studios, London
- Genre: Musical theatre
- Length: 221:31
- Languages: English and Latin
- Label: EMI Records
- Producer: John Fraser

Show Boat is a 221-minute studio album of Jerome Kern's musical, performed by a cast headed by Karla Burns, Jerry Hadley, Bruce Hubbard, Frederica von Stade and Teresa Stratas with the Ambrosian Chorus and the London Sinfonietta under the direction of John McGlinn. It was recorded from June 1 to August 31, 1987 at Abbey Road Studios in London.

== Background ==
Show Boat was first staged on 15 November 1927 at an out-of-town tryout at the National Theatre in Washington, D.C.. In accordance with normal practice, the creators of the show made several changes to it before its Broadway premiere at the Ziegfeld Theatre six weeks later. The Pantry scene (Act 1, Scene 2) and the Waterfront saloon scene (Act 1, Scene 3) were shortened, "Mis'ry's comin' aroun'", "I would like to play a lover's part" and "It's getting hotter in the north" were discarded, and "I might fall back on you", "Why do I love you?" and "Hey, feller!" were added.

The performing score that John McGlinn constructed for his album is a conflation of Jerome Kern's Washington and New York versions, and more comprehensive than either. The Pantry and Waterfront saloon scenes are recorded in their abbreviated versions, but the three numbers deleted before the show's Broadway premiere are reinstated, and the three new numbers composed for New York are included too. Nearly all of the dialogue for which Kern composed underscoring is present as well. An hour-long appendix presents further material. McGlinn provides the original, longer versions of the Pantry and Waterfront saloon scenes; "Kim's imitations", a number written for the first Kim, Norma Terris, when she declined to sing "It's getting hotter in the north" on the grounds that it was "lousy jazz"; "Dance away the night", a number written for the show's first London staging in 1928; "Gallivantin' aroun'", "I have the room above her" and "Ah still suits me", numbers composed for Universal's 1936 Show Boat movie; "Nobody else but me", the last song that Kern wrote, composed for a revival of the show in 1946; and four numbers that were dropped in rehearsal, "Yes, ma'am", "A pack of cards", "The Creole love song" and "Out there in an orchard". A fifth number excised before the Washington tryout, the Trocadero opening chorus, is included in the main body of the album.

The three songs from the 1936 film are heard with orchestrations that Larry Moore transcribed from its soundtrack. The orchestrations for the five numbers discarded during rehearsal were composed by Russell Warner. The remaining orchestrations are all the original versions crafted by Robert Russell Bennett. Thought lost for decades, they were found just a few years before the album was made: Bennett and the musical theatre historian Miles Kreuger unearthed one batch in 1978 in the Rodgers and Hammerstein's Music Library's Queens warehouse on West 52nd Street, and a further cache was found in 1982 in Warner Brothers' music archive in their warehouse in Secaucus, New Jersey. The vocal score of "A pack of cards" was recovered even more serendipitously: the only copy of it known to have survived turned up amongst a sheaf of old sheet music in a second-hand book store in Sacramento, California.

The making of the album was beset by several difficulties. While the estates of Kern and Edna Ferber were enthusiastic about the project, Oscar Hammerstein's son William thought it fundamentally misconceived, believing that the alterations that had been made to the show in its tryout phase had been done with good reason and ought not to be reversed. Moreover, Warner Brothers and the Kern estate spent five years wrangling over who owned the copyright of the hundreds of pages of Kern's manuscripts that had been disinterred in Secaucus. The Secaucus material that McGlinn needed for his album did not become available to him until three days before he recorded it, and then only because Beverly Sills, operatic eminence and a director of Warner Communications, prevailed upon the company to sell McGlinn and EMI the scores that they wanted for a sum in five figures. (The cost of making the entire album exceeded half a million dollars.)

A further problem arose from Hammerstein's lyrics. The very first word uttered in the musical is "Niggers". It had long been customary to censor this, but McGlinn did not want to subject Hammerstein's text to bowdlerization. When the black artists whom he had recruited from the Glyndebourne Festival's production of Porgy and Bess to form Show Boat's Black Chorus realized what they were going to have to sing, they resigned from the project in protest, and Willard White, McGlinn's preferred Joe, decided to go with them. McGlinn replaced White with Bruce Hubbard, also hired from Glyndebourne, after the baritone had spent a day conferring with Eartha Kitt and other friends about whether he should accept McGlinn's invitation. The Black Chorus's music was taken over by members of the Ambrosian Singers who had already been contracted to supply the album's other choral requirements.

Edward Seckerson interviewed John McGlinn about the making of the album for a feature article published in Gramophone in November 1988. Christopher Swann shot extensive footage of the making of the album for a Granada Television documentary, The Show Boat Story, which has become available to view online.

== Recording ==
The album was digitally recorded in June, July and August 1987 in Studio No. 1, Abbey Road Studios, London.

== Cover art ==
The covers of the LP, cassette and CD versions of the album all use an image adapted from the dust-jacket designed by René Clarke for the first edition of the Edna Ferber novel upon which the musical is based, Show Boat, published by Doubleday, Page & Company in 1926.

== Critical reception ==
=== Reviews ===
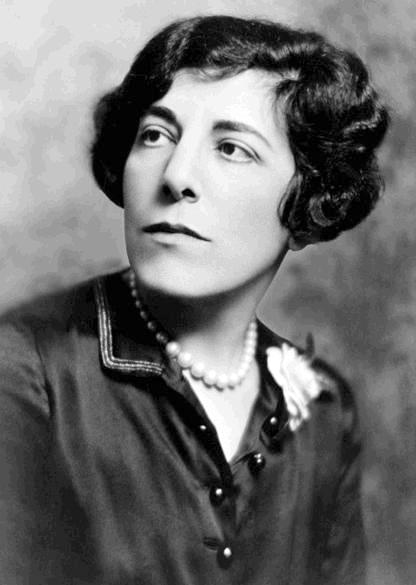
Edna Ferber in 1928, two years after the publication of her Show Boat novel and a year after the première of Jerome Kern's musical

Andrew Lamb reviewed the album on CD in Gramophone in November 1988. "Never", he wrote, "... have I been so bowled over by a musical theatre recording as by this". Before listening to it, he had been apprehensive that it might be one of those albums on which a Broadway score was mistreated by a gang of gatecrashers from the world of opera. In the event, his fears had proved needless.

Innumerable artists, among them some of the most eminent, had sung "Bill", "Ol' man river", "Make believe" and "Can't help lovin' dat man", but none that Lamb had ever heard had presented these numbers with the "beauty and style" bestowed upon them by the singers chosen by John McGlinn. "The love duets between [Frederica] von Stade and Jerry Hadley", he wrote, were "quite stunningly beautiful, and Bruce Hubbard's firm, honeyed baritone has absolutely nothing to fear from the inevitable comparisons with Paul Robeson".

In their secondary roles, Karla Burns (as Queenie), David Garrison (as Frank), Robert Nichols (as Cap'n Andy) and Paige O'Hara (as Ellie) were all "superb" too. This was not to say that every soloist was entirely perfect in every respect. Teresa Stratas, while "ravishing" in "Can't help lovin' dat man", occasionally came across as "a shade too self-conscious", and Nancy Kulp brought back memories of Dustin Hoffman in Tootsie.

There was no doubt that the Ambrosian Chorus had relished their "rousing" contributions, and the London Sinfonietta were positively riotous in the jazzy music that Kern wrote for Kim's scene in Act 3. But neither they nor any of the album's famous soloists deserved as much credit for the album's success as its conductor. John McGlinn's use of Robert Russell Bennett's original orchestrations made his recording very different from any previous version of Show Boat. This was plain from the very first bars of the overture: a tuba sounded "a note of dark foreboding" before a cheery banjo led the way to the orchestra's enthusiastic introduction to "Why do I love you?". (As well as his work on the podium, McGlinn put in a cameo appearance as Magnolia's rehearsal pianist in Act 2.)

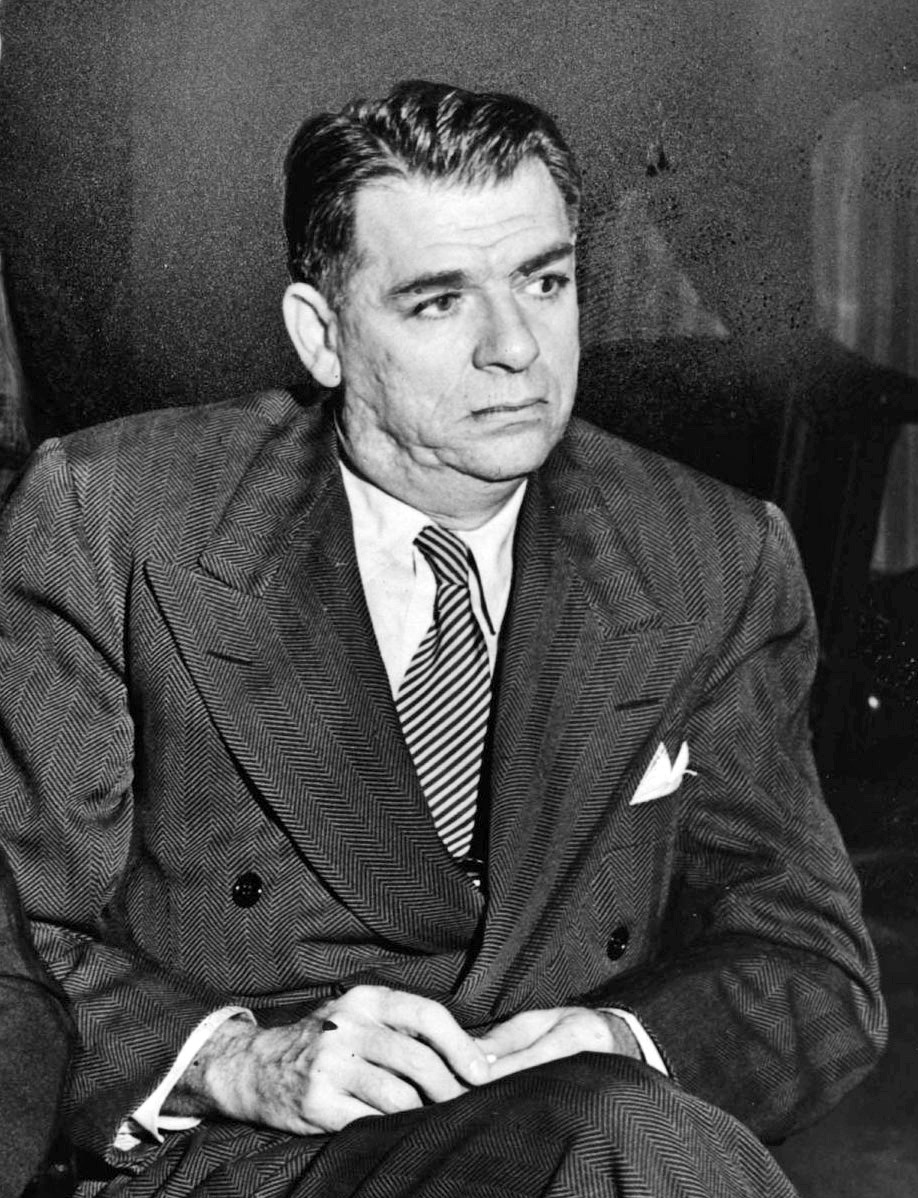
Oscar Hammerstein II

The album's historical authenticity was not the only thing that set it apart from its predecessors. It was also encyclopedically comprehensive. "Mis'ry's comin' aroun'" was just one of several excellent pieces heard on McGlinn's discs that had been excised from the score of Show Boat almost before Kern's ink had had time to dry. An appendix included every note that a Kern devotee could desire, except for "How'd you like to spoon with me?", a number added for a production in London in 1928. McGlinn had also recorded lengthy passages of underscored dialogue, and it was the magnificence of these, ironically, that laid him open to accusations of an error of judgement. There were places - Act 1, Scene 3 for example - where dialogue was wholly absent. "By all means abridge the linking dialogue", Lamb wrote, "but to include the dialogue and underscoring complete in some scenes and not at all in others seems to me to distort the scale and balance of the piece". It might have been wiser to buy room for the missing dialogue by pruning the appendix a little. Two of its items - found in manuscript in a second-hand bookshop - hardly sounded as though they had anything to do with the Cotton Blossom at all.

All in all, though, the album was an "inspired", "quite irresistible achievement". What Solti's Decca Ring cycle had been to the history of opera, McGlinn's Show Boat was to the history of American musical theatre.

Eric Salzman reviewed the album on CD in Stereo Review in December 1988. "John McGlinn", he wrote, "is a man on a mission: to restore the lost glories of the great old American musical". His Show Boat was the most ambitious project that he had undertaken to date. Never before had a musical been reconstructed so meticulously. The original score, numbers that were dropped and new numbers composed for the stage or the screen were all present and correct.

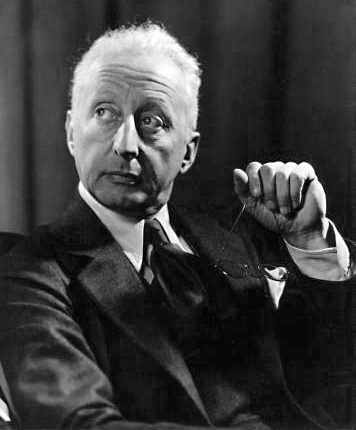
Jerome Kern in 1934

Robert Russell Bennett's 1927 orchestrations had been retrieved from the cobwebbed recesses of a warehouse in Secaucus. The sombre overture had been rescued from oblivion. Listeners could enjoy several wonderful old dance tunes and some liberally underscored dialogue (unbowdlerized. even at its most offensive).

Show Boat itself. alas, was not as great a work as some of its apologists claimed. Its source, Edna Ferber's novel, was not "a deathless work of art ('potboiler' might be closer to the mark)". Oscar Hammerstein II's text was spoiled by a ramshackle plot and a good deal of sentimentality. Despite moments of seriousness such as "Ol' man river", it was concerned less with social history or psychology than with the hackneyed trope of "what show-biz folks are like behind the scenes." Kern's frequent repetition of his catchiest melodies was an instance of a composer flogging his best tunes to death, not of one engaged in an architecture of Wagnerian leitmotivs. Kern and Hammerstein had crafted their magnum opus at a time when Puccini was in his grave, and Berg, Eugene O'Neill. Bertolt Brecht and Kurt Weill were already famous. Show Boat was already old-fashioned when it was premiered, and it would be a mistake to claim more for it than "a certain antique charm".

McGlinn's cast included some outstanding singers, but it was questionable whether a Show Boat starring Frederica von Stade, Jerry Hadley, Teresa Stratas and Bruce Hubbard could seem other than a "very old-fashioned, if inspired operetta". Kern had tried to re-energize the tired genre in which he worked with an infusion of jazz and blues. These were musical territories to which most of McGlinn's stars were strangers, and McGlinn's brisk, businesslike conducting allowed little scope for a bluesy mood to be created. Karla Burns was a "heavy jazz and blues performer of the old school", but McGlinn never gave her an opportunity to really do her thing. McGlinn's London Sinfonietta did not have a rhythm section that could play either jazz or blues satisfactorily.

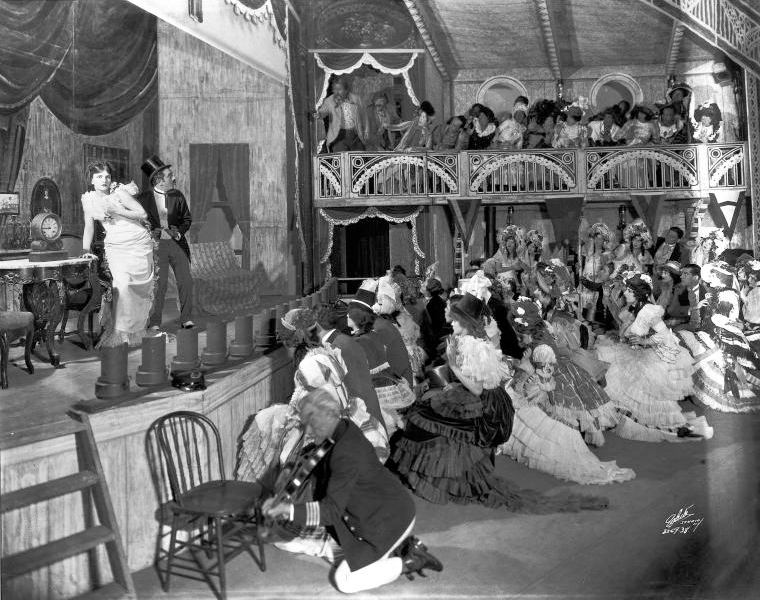
The original Broadway production of Show Boat, 1927

McGlinn's album was best enjoyed when listened to unreflectively. One could recognize that it was an extraordinary performance. McGlinn's rebuilt performing score worked very well. His long appendix was a cornucopia of treats. Von Stade and Stratas were astute enough to sing Kern in a manner closer to that of operetta than to that of their usual opera. McGlinn's pacing was sometimes too brisk, but most of his tempos were appropriate, and he took "the bigger numbers (where he is at his best) up to some rather breathless and even thrilling heights".

To sum up, Show Boat was not a work of any depth either musically or dramatically. But Hammerstein made up for his crude storytelling with some good, and even great, lyrics. Kern supplied "endlessly lavish musical innovation", and was one of the few composers to have successfully infused operetta with a contemporary American idiom. Bennett's orchestrations were extremely well crafted. The best numbers in the score "had not lost any of their lustre". There were enough good things in Show Boat to merit the "care and genuine affection" and "devotion, talent and enthusiasm" with which McGlinn and his colleagues had gone about their work.

J. B. Steane reviewed the album on CD in Gramophone in January 1989. At first, he wrote, listening to the recording was blissful. The overture, with its ominous opening chord, delighted and impressed him with its implicit promise of a performance of genuine substance. Then the first few choruses lifted him up into the gaiety of the Cotton Blossom's spirit. Magnolia von Stade's contribution to "Only make believe" melted him; Bruce Hubbard's "Ol' man river" enraptured him; and "when it came to 'Fish gotta swim, birds gotta fly' and their many repetitions, they couldn't do what they gotta do too often for me". And then, having loved everything that he had heard thus far, he decided to take a break.

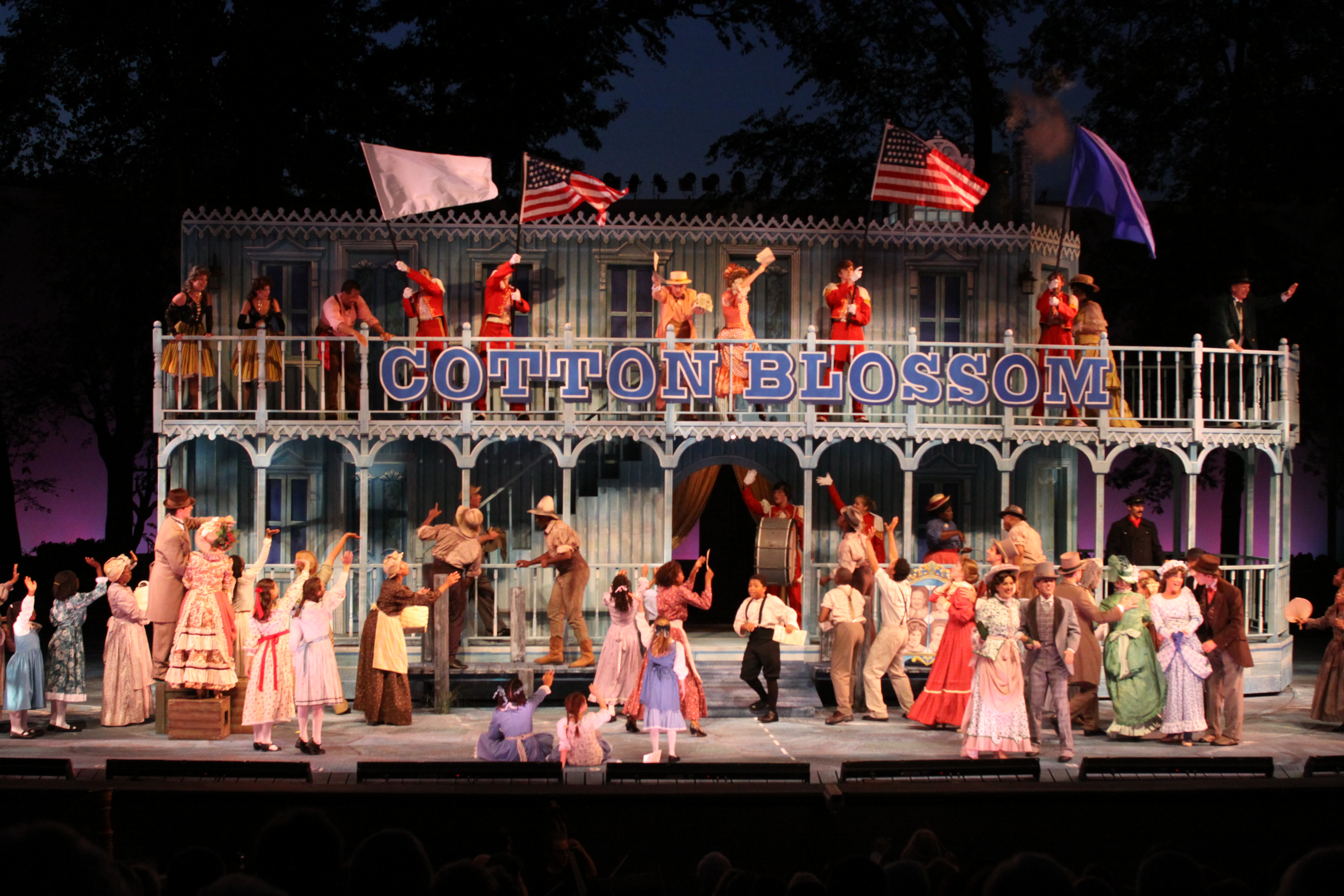
Show Boat at the Muny – the St Louis Municipal Opera Theatre – in 2010

After his interval, he rejoiced to find that some of the musical's biggest hits were still to come. But between "Why do I love you" and "Just my Bill", things started to go wrong. There was a lacuna in the narrative. He wanted to know what had happened to the characters in the interval, but EMI's booklet had nothing to say on the matter. The disappointment would have been easy to shrug off if the music had sustained its excellence, but then, in the music-hall sequence, Kern's inspiration seemed to wilt in tandem with the album's story-telling. Ravenal's desertion of Magnolia was glossed over, and the ending of the piece felt all but "perfunctory". Like Lamb before him, Steane felt that McGlinn would have been wiser to sacrifice some of his bonus tracks in order to make room for more dialogue. "Scholarship and entertainment are somewhat at odds here."

Patrick O'Connor mentioned the album in Gramophone in March 2003 while reviewing a disc of excerpts from it. It was, he wrote, "something of a landmark, ... one of the best recordings of any music-theatre piece ever made. The cast is flawless, ... with Teresa Stratas a vivid, ironic Julie. ... John McGlinn has done nothing better in disc; the production sounds as fresh now as fifteen years ago."

Writing about the making of the album in The New York Times on 25 September 1988, Stephen Holden described it as "magnificently recorded and sung" with "vital, intense performances".

=== Accolades ===
Writing in Gramophone in December 1988, Adrian Edwards included the album in his Critics' Choice list of the best recordings of the year. "I had never believed that Show Boat could be mentioned in the same breath as Porgy and Bess," he wrote, "yet McGlinn's recording demonstrates how subtly Kern and Hammerstein placed each number in the course of their 180-minute saga."

In the Gramophone Awards for 1989, the album won the prize for the best musical theatre recording of the year.

Writing in Gramophone in December 1989, Andrew Lamb named the album as his Critics' Choice best recording of the decade. "To select a Record of the Eighties is a formidable task indeed", he wrote. "But ... I find no real challenge for the three-CD Show Boat. ... Singing and playing are superb, and ... the use of original orchestrations plays its part in the success; as well as the inclusion of much splendid, rediscovered music,"

== Track listing, CD1 ==
Jerome Kern (1885–1945)

Show Boat (1927), with book and lyrics by Oscar Hammerstein II (1895–1960); adapted from the novel Show Boat (1926) by Edna Ferber (1885–1968); with original orchestrations by Robert Russell Bennett and additional orchestrations by Russell Warner and Larry Moore

- 1 (5:34) Overture

Act One, Scene One

Cotton Blossom

- 2 (4:54) "Niggers all work on de Mississippi" (Stevedores, Gals, Queenie, Steve, Pete, 1st Mincing Miss, 2nd Mincing Miss, Beaux, Girls, Boys)
- 3 (0:47) "Andy!!!" (Parthy, Windy, 1st Mincing Miss, 2nd Mincing Miss)

Cap'n Andy's Ballyhoo

- 4 (3:41) "Here comes the Show Boat parade!" (Boy, Girls, Boys, Andy, Parthy)
- 5 (3:58) "Hey Julie" (Pete, Julie, Steve, Parthy, Andy, Ellie)
- 6 (1:26) "It's a man" (Ellie, Ravenal, Vallon)

Where's the mate for me?

- 7 (3:35) "Who cares if my boat goes upstream" (Ravenal, Magnolia)

Make believe

- 8 (5:02) "Only make believe I love you" (Ravenal, Magnolia, Vallon)

Ol' man river

- 9 (5:42) "Oh, Joe!" (Magnolia, Joe, Men)

Act One, Scene Two

Can't help lovin' dat man

- 10 (8:07) "What cher doin' all by yourself, Miss Nola?" (Queenie, Magnolia, Julie, Joe, Servants)

Act One, Scene Three

Life on the wicked stage

- 11 (3:36) "Why do stage struck maidens clamor" (Ellie, Girls)

Till good luck comes my way

- 12 (2:26) "The man who ventures with chance" (Ravenal, Men)

Act One, Scene Four

Mis'ry's comin' aroun'

- 13 (6:10) "Mis'ry's comin' aroun'" (Queenie, Women, Joe, Magnolia, Julie, Men, Solo Bass)
- 14 (3:38) "Take her up, Rubberface!" (Andy, Julie, Steve, Magnolia, Parthy, Ellie, Windy)
- 15 (2:46) "Hello, Windy" (Vallon, Andy, Magnolia, Steve, Julie, Windy, Ellie, Parthy)
- 16 (3:20) "You needn't look at us" (Steve, Black Chorus, Andy, Parthy, Magnolia, Ellie, Frank)
- 17 (5:25) "Looks like a swell" (Andy, Parthy, Frank, Ravenal, Julie, Magnolia, Steve, Joe)

== Track listing, CD2 ==
Act One, Scene Five

I would like to play a lover's part

- 1 (4:10) "Her face is fair to look upon" (Boys, Girls, Ellie, Frank)

I might fall back on you

- 2 (3:00) "Little girl, you are safe with me" (Frank, Ellie, Girls)

Queenie's Ballyhoo

- 3 (3:14) "Is de theater fillin' up, Cap'n Andy?" (Queenie, Andy, Black Chorus)

Act One, Scene Six

Villain Dance

- 4 (0:58) Dance

Act One, Scene Seven

You are love

- 5 (8:00) "That you, Nola?" (Ravenal, Windy, Magnolia, Parthy)

Act One, Scene Eight

Finale, Act One

- 6 (6:05) "Oh tell me, did you ever! (Girls, Boys, Chorus, Andy, Women, Men, Black Women, Magnolia)

Act Two, Scene One

At the fair

- 7 (4:11) "When we tell them about it all" (All, 1st Barker, Boys, Girls, Chorus, 2nd Barker, Men, 3rd Barker)

Why do I love you?

- 8 (6:38) "I'm walking on the air, dear" (Magnolia, Ravenal, Chorus, Andy)

In Dahomey

- 9 (3:43) "Dyunga doe!" (Dahomey Villagers, White Chorus)

Act Two, Scene Three

Convent Scene

- 10 (7:17) "Alma Redemptoris Mater" (Nuns, Mother Superior, Ravenal, Kim)

Act Two, Scene Four

- 11 (1:04) "All right, Jake" (Jim, Jake, Julie)

Bill [lyrics by P. G. Wodehouse (1918), revised by Hammerstein (1927)]

- 12 (4:12) "I used to dream" (Julie)

Magnolia's audition

Can't help lovin' dat man (Reprise)

- 13 (1:48) "Fish gotta swim, birds gotta fly" (Magnolia)
- 14 (1:42) "Whaddaya say, boss?" (Frank, Jim, Magnolia, Jake)

Act Two, Scene Six

Trocadero opening chorus

- 15 (2:47) "Let's make the new year" (Chorus)

Apache Dance

- 16 (2:14) Dance

Goodbye, my lady love

- 17 (2:40) "So you're going away" (Frank, Ellie)

After the ball

- 18 (3:31) "Ladies and gentlemen" (Jim, Drunk, Andy, Magnolia, A Man, All)

Act Two, Scene Seven

Ol' man river (Reprise)

- 19 (2:09) "Ol' man river" (Joe)

Hey, feller!

- 20 (2:30) "When you yen for a gent" (Queenie, Chorus)

Act Two, Scene Eight

You are love (Reprise)

- 21 (2:12) "That you, Nola?" (Ravenal)

== Track listing, CD3 ==
Act Two, Scene Nine

Cotton Blossom (Reprise)

- 1 (0:39) "Cotton Blossom" (Chorus)

It's getting hotter in the north

- 2 (8:57) "Now up in the northern land" (Kim, Chorus)
- 3 (1:08) "Say, Cap'n Andy" (Frank, Ellie, Andy)

Finale ultimo

- 4 (2:59) "Hello, Gay" (Andy, Hope, Ravenal, Girl, Man, Magnolia, Old Lady on the Levee, Chorus)

——― APPENDIX ———

Pantry scene (Act One, Scene Two; deleted – 1927)

- 5 (12:52) "What cher doin' all by yourself, Miss Nola?" (Queenie, Magnolia, Julie, Joe, Servants)

Waterfront saloon scene (Act One, Scene Three; deleted – 1927)

- 6 (4:38) "Number four, black!" (Voice Off, Ravenal, Lounger, Gambler)

Yes Ma'am (Act One, Scene Three; unused – 1927)

- 7 (2:30) "Bet your hat" (Girls, Ellie)

Kim's imitations (Act Two, Scene Nine; Ziegfeld production – 1927)

- 8 (4:12) "Why do I love you?" (Kim, Chorus)

Dance away the night (Act Two, Scene Nine; London – 1928)

- 9 (4:26) "Music in the air" (Kim, Girls, Boys)

A pack of cards (Act One, Scene Six [?]; unused - 1927)

- 10 (5:07) "One night as I sat by my fireside so weary" (Magnolia)

The Creole love song (Act One, Scene Seven; unused – 1927)

- 11 (6:05) "That you, Nola?" (Ravenal, Windy, Magnolia)

Out there in an orchard (Act Two, Scene Four; unused – 1927)

- 12 (3:41) "There was a sun sinking slowly in the west" (Julie)

Gallivantin' around (Universal film – 1936)

- 13 (2:41) "Liza Matilda Hill" (Magnolia, Chorus)

I have the room above her (Universal film – 1936)

- 14 (4:47) "Seems to me I've seen that stocking someplace" (Ravenal, Magnolia)

Ah still suits me (Universal film – 1936)

- 15 (3:44) "Joe! Dere you go again!" (Queenie, Joe)

Nobody else but me (Act Two, Scene Nine; Revival – 1946)

- 16 (6:48) "I was a shy, demure type" (Kim, Chorus)

== Personnel ==
=== Musicians and actors ===
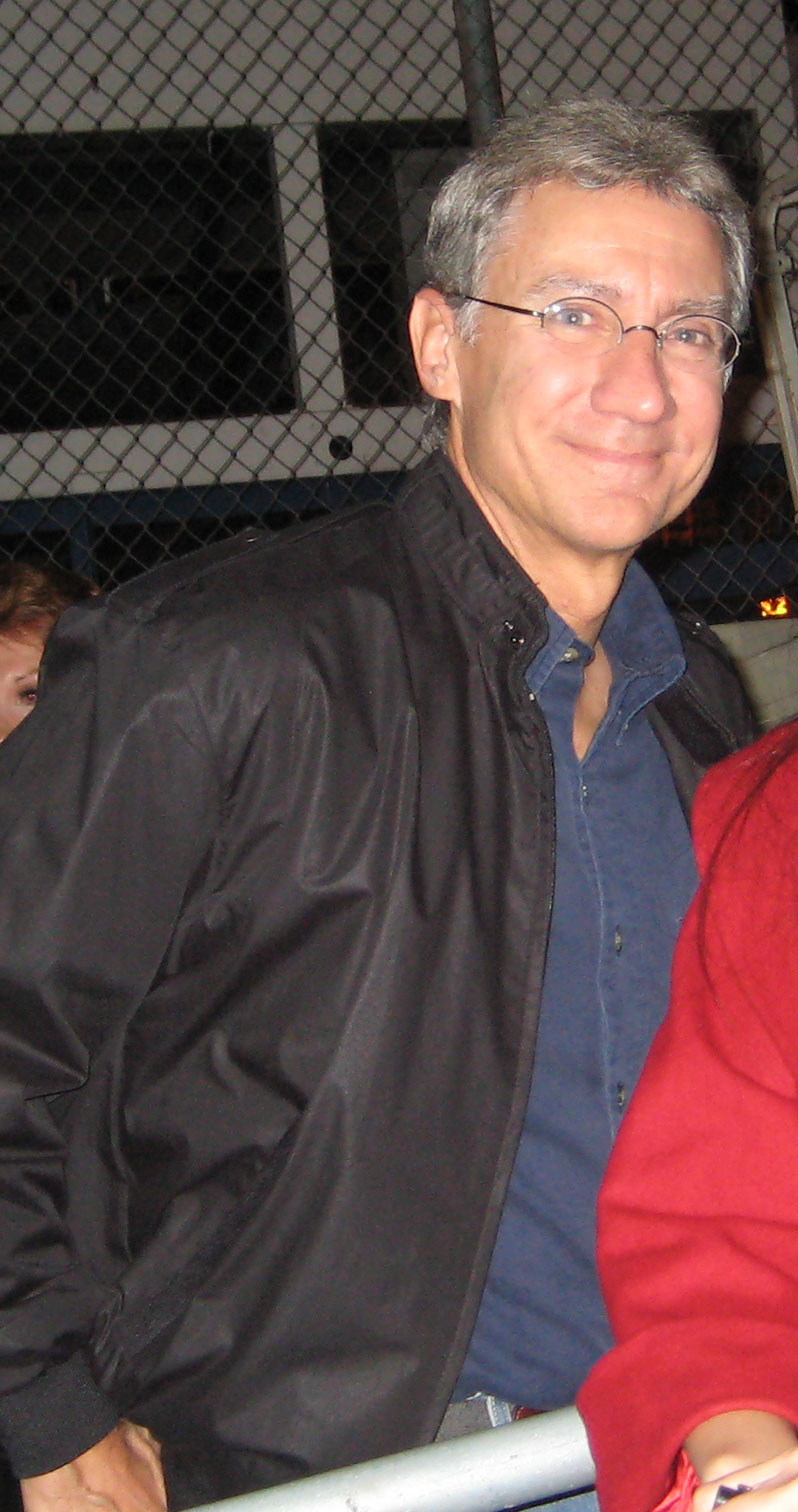
Frank - David Garrison

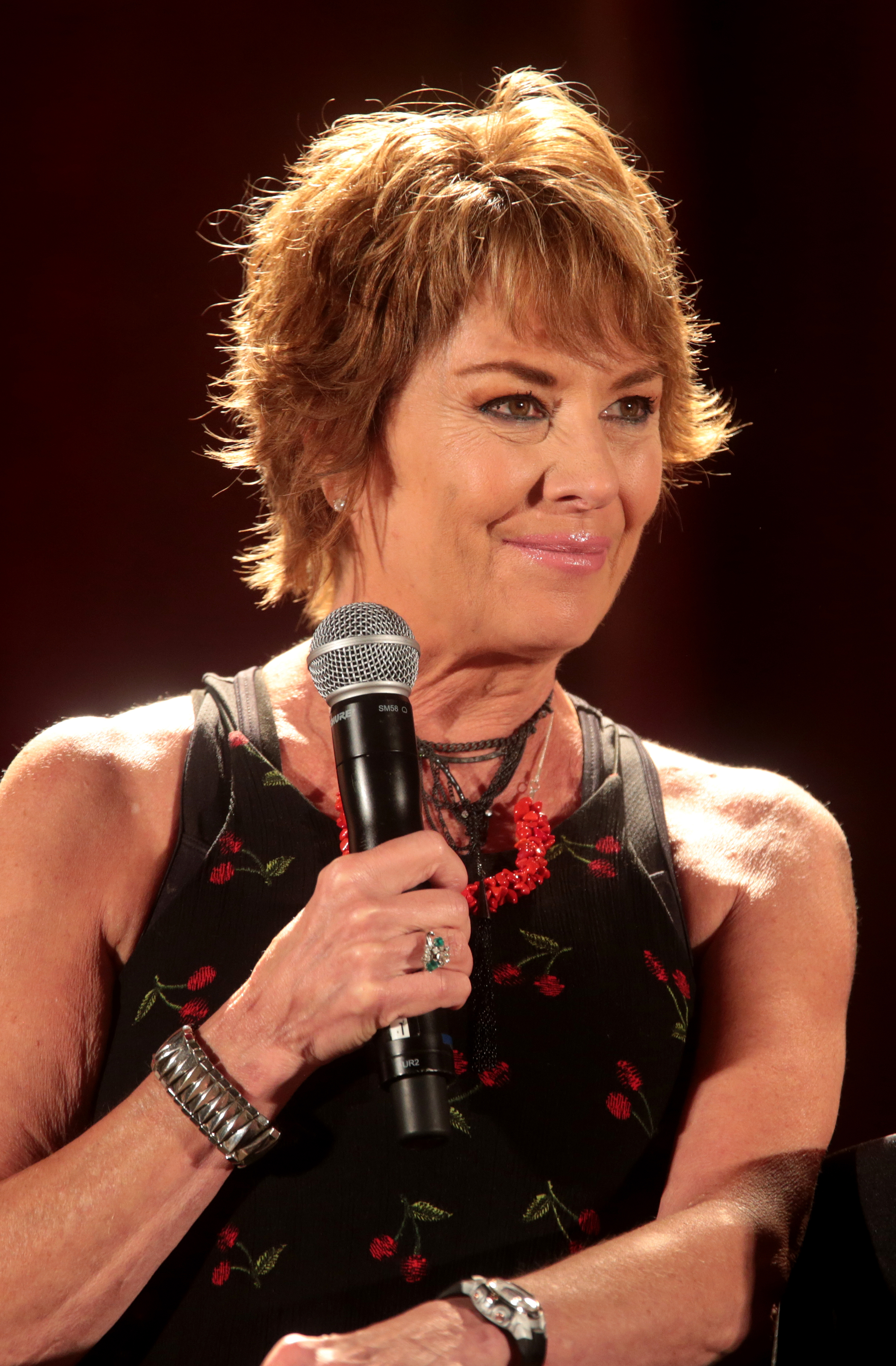
Ellie - Paige O'Hara

- Robert Nichols (1924–2013), Cap'n Andy Hawkes, owner of the Cotton Blossom, husband of Parthy
- Nancy Kulp (1921–1991), Parthy Ann Hawkes, wife of Cap'n Andy
- Frederica von Stade (born 1945), Magnolia Hawkes, daughter of Andy and Parthy
- Jerry Hadley (1952–2007), Gaylord Ravenal, a riverboat gambler
- Kerry Schulz, Kim, daughter of Magnolia and Ravenal, as a child
- Frederica von Stade, Kim as a woman
- Bruce Hubbard (1952–1991), Joe, a dock worker, husband of Queenie
- Karla Burns (1954–2021), Queenie, a cook, husband of Joe
- Steve Barton (1954–2001), Steve Baker, a leading man, husband of Julie
- Teresa Stratas (born 1938), Julie LaVerne, a leading lady, wife of Steve
- David Garrison (born 1952), Frank Schultz, a performer, husband of Ellie
- Paige O'Hara (born 1956), Ellie May Chipley, a singer and dancer
- Ed Bishop (1932–2005), Windy McClain, pilot of the Cotton Blossom
- Ron Travis, Pete, engineer of the Cotton Blossom
- Jack Dabdoub (1925–2014), Sheriff Vallon
- Margaret Tyzack (1931–2011), Mother Superior
- Tayleurs Dumme, 1st Barker
- George Dvorsky, 2nd Barker
- Kevin Colson (1937–2018), 3rd Barker
- Merwin Goldsmith (1937–2019), Jim
- John McGlinn (1953-2009), Jake, Magnolia's rehearsal pianist
- Gillian Bevan (born 1956), a Mincing Miss
- Deborah Poplett, a Mincing Miss
- Simon Green, a Trocadero patron
- Evan Pappas, a Trocadero patron
- Vernon Midgley (born 1940), the Faro Dealer
- Ray Gill (1950–1992), a Gambler
- Mark D. Kaufmann, a Lounger
- Dyer Thurst, a Lounger
- Mark D. Kaufmann, a Show Boat patron
- Jeanne Lehman, a Show Boat patron
- Rebecca Luker (1961–2020), a Show Boat patron
- Maryetta Midgley (born 1942), a Servant
- Meriel Dickinson, a Servant
- Michael Pearn, a Servant
- Leslie Fyson, a Servant
- Lillian Gish (1893–1993), the Lady on the levee
- Simon Green, dance double
- Peter Burke, dance double
- Wayne Marshall (born 1961), stage piano
- Ambrosian Chorus
- John McCarthy, chorus master
- London Sinfonietta
- William Hicks, répétiteur
- John McGlinn (1953–2008), conductor

=== Other ===
- John Fraser, producer
- Michael Sheady, balance engineer
- John Kurlander, remixing engineer
- Peter Mew, 24-track Sony editing
- Alison Fox, production assistant
- Michael Allen, director of administration

== Release history ==
In 1988, Angel Records released the album in the US as a triple LP (catalogue number DSC 49108), triple cassette (catalogue number A2 49108) and triple CD (catalogue number A4 49108). Also in 1988, EMI records released the album in the UK in the same three formats (with catalogue numbers RIVER 1 for the triple LP, TCRIVER 1 for the triple cassette and CDRIVER 1 for the triple CD). The CDs were issued in a slipcase with a 136-page booklet containing a synopsis, a libretto, a historical essay by Miles Krueger, notes by John McGlinn, an interview with Florenz Ziegfeld's secretary about the musical's original production, fourteen historical photographs and portraits of von Stade, Hadley, Stratas, Hubbard, Burns, Garrison, O'Hara, Nichols, Kulp, Barton, Dabdoub, Gish and McGlinn.
