= Maryetta Midgley =

English soprano singer

Maryetta Midgley (born 27 May 1942) is an English soprano singer.

Midgley was born in Edinburgh, Scotland, the daughter of operatic tenor Walter Midgley and pianist Gladys Vernon. She is the sister of tenor Vernon Midgley. She was educated at the Holy Cross School, New Malden, Surrey, England. She won a scholarship to the Trinity College of Music, where she studied singing and the piano.

She began her career with the George Mitchell Singers and made her first radio broadcast as a child in Round the Horne. She appeared in the "Fol-De-Rols" at the Congress Theatre, Eastbourne and in Camelot at the Theatre Royal Drury Lane. She has broadcast regularly on BBC Radio 2 in Friday Night is Music Night, "Melodies for You", "Among Your Souvenirs", "Saturday Night is Gala Night" and "Robert Farnon's World of Music". With her brother Vernon she appeared frequently on BBC TV's The Good Old Days.

She performed in Wiener Blut, Show Boat, Les cloches de Corneville, and La rondine, with Lorin Maazel in 1981. She founded MVM Records and produced over 15 albums exclusively of the entire family. In a broadcast of "Friday Night is Music Night" in 1976 from Fairfield Halls Croydon, all four Midgleys performed together for the only time.

She retired from professional singing in 1992, after 42 years, and runs an unrelated business with her husband Richard.

== Discography ==
- Jerome Kern: Show Boat, conducted by John McGlinn, EMI CDRIVER1, 1988
- Melodies, melodies all the way. Maryetta Midgley (soprano), Vernon Midgley (tenor), Orchestra of Romance conducted by Harold Geller, Philips 6382 113
