= John McGlinn =

American historian (1953–2009)

- Born: John Alexander McGlinn III; September 18, 1953; Bryn Mawr, Pennsylvania, US
- Died: February 14, 2009 (aged 55); New York City, US
- Occupations: Conductor and musical theatre archivist

John Alexander McGlinn III (September 18, 1953 – February 14, 2009) was an American conductor and musical theatre archivist. He was a leading advocate of the use of original orchestrations and vocal arrangements in studio cast recordings of Broadway musicals, and he made several notable albums exemplifying his philosophy of historical authenticity.

== Biography ==
McGlinn was born in Bryn Mawr, Pennsylvania, and raised in Gladwyne, Pennsylvania. A self-taught pianist, he studied music theory and composition at Northwestern University, graduating in 1976. His 1984 Songs of New York for Book of the Month Club was not his first experience as a recording conductor. He had conducted Hey Feller! and Misery's Come Round using Karla Burns and members of a Houston Grand Opera production of Show Boat for one of the Jerome Kern Revisited albums on Ben Bagley's Painted Smiles Records. He had also worked for New York City Opera and planned a book on Jerome Kern.

McGlinn's interest in Kern emerged at the same time as a 1970s revival of interest in authentic American music, including a Scott Joplin revival and Gunther Schuller's ragtime performances. In the early 1980s McGlinn joined with Houston Grand Opera to work on a revival of Kern and Oscar Hammerstein's Show Boat, acting as musical editor and restoring its original orchestrations. He worked for Ira Gershwin on original orchestrations for several Gershwin projects and with veteran orchestrator Hans Spialek on the 1983 Broadway revival of On Your Toes.

After the Book-of-the-Month Club recording he performed three Kern musicals in concert at Carnegie Recital Hall, and this led to a recording contract with EMI Records, the first fruits of which were albums of Gershwin songs with Kiri Te Kanawa and Gershwin overtures.

From 1987 to 1992 he made best-selling recordings of the complete scores of Show Boat, Anything Goes, Brigadoon, Annie Get Your Gun, Kiss Me, Kate and an obscure Jerome Kern musical, Sitting Pretty.

The three-disc, three-and-a-half hour Show Boat album was highly acclaimed, and the one-disc Anything Goes album, was acclaimed by some, but panned by others. The New Yorker magazine called McGlinn's Show Boat "the show album of the past" and "a show album for the future. It unites the possibilities of reproduction and reinvestigation." McGlinn unearthed the lost materials for Show Boat in a Secaucus, New Jersey, warehouse in 1982.

In 1992, EMI chose not to renew his contract. During this period he conducted many performances of musicals in concert, including the original 1925 No, No, Nanette (at the Carnegie Recital Hall), and the Kern-Hammerstein show Sunny. He made several radio appearances with the BBC Symphony Orchestra for BBC Radio 3, conducted several concerts in conjunction with the Library of Congress Music Division, and was guest conductor on an "Evening With The Boston Pops" telecast. He returned to the recording studio to make two albums of excerpts from Wagner operas for Naxos Records. At the New York City Opera he conducted revivals of Brigadoon and H.M.S. Pinafore and, in 1993, at Juilliard School of Music, he conducted the Poulenc one-act operas La Voix humaine and Les Mamelles de Tirésias. Another project, begun in early 2001, was to record and edit for The Packard Humanities Institute scholarly editions of Victor Herbert and Jerome Kern musicals, but none of these albums has been released. McGlinn left the project in 2002 and the future of the recordings remains in limbo. His last project was to edit a new edition of the 1954 Broadway version of Peter Pan for Samuel French.

McGlinn was found dead in his New York City apartment on February 14, 2009, of a heart attack. He was 55 years old.

== Discography ==
- Irving Berlin: Annie Get Your Gun, EMI Records 54206, 1991
- George Gershwin: Kiri sings Gershwin, EMI Records 47454, 1987
- George Gershwin: Gershwin Overtures, EMI Records 47977, 1987
- Jerome Kern: Show Boat, EMI Records 49108, 1988
- Jerome Kern: Jerome Kern Treasury, EMI Records 54883, 1993
- Jerome Kern: Overtures and Music from Swing Time, EMI 49630, 1989
- Jerome Kern: Sitting Pretty, New World Records 80387, 1990
- Frederick Loewe: Brigadoon, EMI Records 54481, 1992
- Cole Porter: Anything Goes, EMI Records 89442, 1989
- Cole Porter: Kiss Me, Kate, EMI Records 54033, 1990
- Cole Porter: Night and Day - Thomas Hampson sings Cole Porter, EMI Records 54203, 1991
- Cole Porter: Overtures and Ballet Music, EMI Records 54300, 1991
- Richard Rodgers: My Funny Valentine - Frederica von Stade, EMI Records 54071, 1990
- Harry Warren: The Busby Berkeley Album, EMI Records 55189, 1994
- Kurt Weill: Kurt Weill on Broadway, EMI Records 55563, 1996
- various: The Lorelei - Kim Criswell, EMI Records 54802, 1993
- various: Broadway Showstoppers, EMI Records 54586, 1992
- various: Songs of New York, Book-of-the-Month Club Records 417005, 1984
