= Anne Sundberg =

American film director, screenwriter and producer

- Occupations: Director, producer, writer
- Years active: 1995–present

Anne Sundberg is an American film director, screenwriter, and producer, most known for her documentarian work. She works alongside Ricki Stern. She is most known for The Trials of Darryl Hunt (2006), The Devil Came on Horseback (2007), The End of America (2007), Joan Rivers: A Piece of Work (2010), and Surviving Jeffrey Epstein (2020).

== Career ==
In 2000, Sundberg produced Tully directed by Hilary Birmingham. Sundberg was nominated for an Independent Spirit Award for Best Feature at the 18th Independent Spirit Awards.

In 2006, Sundberg co-directed and served as a producer on The Trials of Darryl Hunt, which follows the case of wrongly convicted Darryl Hunt, the film had its world premiere at the Sundance Film Festival in January 2006, and was released in June 2007. Sundberg next directed The Devil Came on Horseback, which had its world premiere at the Sundance Film Festival in January 2007, and premiered on National Geographic in April 2008. That same year, Sundberg co-directed The End of America, based upon the book of the same name by Naomi Wolf.

Sundberg next co-directed Joan Rivers: A Piece of Work which followed comedian Joan Rivers, which had its world premiere at the Sundance Film Festival in January 2010. It was released in June 2010 by IFC Films to critical acclaim. That same year, Sundberg co-directed with Stern and Nic Dunlop, Burma Soldier narrated by Colin Farrell, Sundberg next co-directed Secret Access: UFOS ON the Record, which premiered on the History Channel in August 2011.

In 2012, Sundberg co-directed Knuckleball! which follows baseball players relying on knuckleball. In 2013, Sundberg co-directed Let Them Wear Towels, a short documentary film following Sports Illustrated reporter Melissa Ludtke being denied access to the New York Yankees players locker room, and Lisa Olson a reporter for The Boston Herald who was sexually harassed by New York Patriot members during an interview. From 2014 to 2016, Sundberg co-directed The Fashion Fund a documentary series for Amazon Prime Video following a competition led by Anna Wintour and Diane von Furstenberg nominating promising designers to prove their place in the future of fashion.

In 2015, Sundberg co-directed In My Father's House following musician Rhymefest. In 2016, Sundberg co-directed The Ultimate Captain America Marathon for HBO, which follows several survivors of the Boston Marathon bombings. In 2018, Sundberg co-directed Reversing Roe, which follows abortion laws in the United States for Netflix.

In 2019, Sundberg co-directed The Preppy Murder: Death in Central Park following the murder of Jennifer Levin in Central Park for AMC and SundanceTV. In 2020, Sundberg co-directed Surviving Jeffrey Epstein for Lifetime, following survivors of convicted pedophile and sex trafficker Jeffrey Epstein.

== Filmography ==
=== Film ===
Year	Title	Notes
1995	One Survivor Remembers	Associate producers
1999	In My Corner	Producer
2000	Tully	Producer
2006	The Trials of Darryl Hunt	Also producer; co-directed with Ricki Stern
2007	The Devil Came on Horseback	Also producer, writer; co-directed with Ricki Stern
2008	The End of America	Also producer, writer, co-directed with Ricki Stern
2010	Joan Rivers: A Piece of Work	Also producer; co-directed with Ricki Stern
2010	Burma Soldier	Also producer, writer; co-directed with Nic Dunlop and Ricki Stern
2012	Knuckleball!	Also producer; co-directed with Ricki Stern
2013	Let Them Wear Towels	Also writer; co-directed with Ricki Stern
2015	In My Father's House	Also writer, producer; co-directed with Ricki Stern
2016	The Ultimate Captain America Marathon	Also writer, producer; co-directed with Ricki Stern
2018	Reversing Roe	Also, producer, co-directed with Ricki Stern

=== Television ===
Year	Title	Notes
2002	Trauma: Life in the E.R.	Producer
2011	Secret Access: UFOs on the Record	Television film; writer, producer, co-directed with Ricki Stern
2014	The Fashion Fund	Director, producer
2019	The Preppy Murder: Death in Central Park	Also producer; co-directed with Ricki Stern
2020	Surviving Jeffrey Epstein	Also producer, writer; co-directed with Ricki Stern
