= Ricki Stern =

American film producer

- Occupations: Director, producer, writer, author
- Years active: 1991–present

Ricki Stern is an American film director, screenwriter, producer, most known for her documentarian work, and author. She works alongside Anne Sundberg. She is most known for The Trials of Darryl Hunt (2006), The Devil Came on Horseback (2007), The End of America (2007), Joan Rivers: A Piece of Work (2010), Surviving Jeffrey Epstein (2020), and Surviving Death (2021).

== Career ==
Stern made her directorial debut with Neglect Not the Children, narrated by Morgan Freeman for PBS. In 1999, Stern directed In My Corner, a documentary following a boxing gym in the Bronx.

In 2006, Stern co-directed and served as a producer on The Trials of Darryl Hunt, which follows the case of wrongly convicted Darryl Hunt, the film had its world premiere at the Sundance Film Festival in January 2006, and was released in June 2007. Stern next directed The Devil Came on Horseback, which had its world premiere at the Sundance Film Festival in January 2007, and premiered on National Geographic in April 2008. That same year, Stern co-directed The End of America, based upon the book of the same name by Naomi Wolf.

In 2009, Stern co-wrote with Heidi Pesky Worcester, the children's novel Beryl E. Bean: Mighty Adventurer of the Planet. Stern next co-directed Joan Rivers: A Piece of Work which followed comedian Joan Rivers, which had its world premiere at the Sundance Film Festival in January 2010. It was released in June 2010 by IFC Films to critical acclaim. That same year, Stern co-directed with Sundberg and Nic Dunlop, Burma Soldier narrated by Colin Farrell, Stern next co-directed Secret Access: UFOS ON the Record, which premiered on the History Channel in August 2011.

In 2012, Stern co-directed Knuckleball! which follows baseball players relying on knuckleball. In 2013, Stern co-directed Let Them Wear Towels, a short documentary film following Sports Illustrated reporter Melissa Ludtke being denied access to the New York Yankees players locker room, and Lisa Olson a reporter for The Boston Herald who was sexually harassed by New York Patriot members during an interview. From 2014 to 2016, Stern co-directed The Fashion Fund a documentary series for Amazon Prime Video following a competition led by Anna Wintour and Diane von Furstenberg nominating promising designers to prove their place in the future of fashion.

In 2015, Stern co-directed In My Father's House following musician Rhymefest. In 2016, Stern co-directed The Ultimate Captain America Marathon for HBO, which follows several survivors of the Boston Marathon bombings. In 2018, Sundberg co-directed Reversing Roe, which follows abortion laws in the United States for Netflix.

In 2019, Stern co-directed The Preppy Murder: Death in Central Park following the murder of Jennifer Levin in Central Park for AMC and SundanceTV. In 2020, Stern co-directed Surviving Jeffrey Epstein for Lifetime, following survivors of convicted pedophile and sex trafficker Jeffrey Epstein.

== Filmography ==
=== Film ===
Year	Title	Notes
1991	Neglect Not the Children	Also producer
1999	In My Corner	Also producer
2006	The Trials of Darryl Hunt	Also producer; co-directed with Anne Sundberg
2007	The Devil Came on Horseback	Also producer, writer; co-directed with Anne Sundberg
2008	The End of America	Also producer, writer, co-directed with Anne Sundberg
2010	Joan Rivers: A Piece of Work	Also producer and writer; co-directed with Anne Sundberg
2010	Burma Soldier	Also producer, writer; co-directed with Nic Dunlop and Anne Sundberg
2012	Knuckleball!	Also producer; co-directed with Anne Sundberg
2013	Let Them Wear Towels	Also writer; co-directed with Anne Sundberg
2015	In My Father's House	Also writer, producer; co-directed with Anne Sundberg
2016	The Ultimate Captain America Marathon	Also writer, producer; co-directed with Anne Sundberg
2018	Reversing Roe	Also, producer, co-directed with Anne Sundberg

=== Television ===
Year	Title	Notes
2011	Secret Access: UFOs on the Record	Television film; writer, producer, co-directed with Anne Sundberg
2014	The Fashion Fund	Director, producer
2019	The Preppy Murder: Death in Central Park	Also producer; co-directed with Anne Sundberg
2020	Surviving Jeffrey Epstein	Also producer, writer; co-directed with Anne Sundberg
2021	Surviving Death	Also producer
