= Nuckols =

Nuckols may refer to:

- Nuckols (surname), a surname
- Nuckols, Kentucky, United States, an unincorporated community
- Nuckols, Virginia, United States, an unincorporated community

== See also ==
- Nuckolls (disambiguation)
