= BYU College of Humanities =

College of humanities in Utah, United States

Coordinates: 40.2484°N 111.6512°W

The BYU College of Humanities was formed in 1965 by the division of the College of Humanities and Social Sciences into the College of Humanities and the College of Social Sciences. The College of Social Sciences was later merged into the College of Family, Home and Social Sciences although some of its programs were made part of the David M. Kennedy Center for International Studies.

When it was formed the College consisted of four departments, Humanities and Comparative Literature; English; Latin American Studies; and Languages. In 1967 the Languages Department was divided into six departments, namely Asian and Slavic Languages; Classical, Biblical and Middle Eastern Languages; French and Italian; Germanic Languages; Linguistics; and Spanish and Portuguese. According to a 2019 analysis published by The Chronicle of Higher Education, BYU is No. 3 in the country for producing the most graduates with foreign language degrees; No. 1 for producing graduates with foreign-language degrees in Arabic, Russian and Portuguese; No. 4 for producing graduates with foreign-language degrees in Korean; and No. 6 for producing graduates with foreign-language degrees in French.

== Majors offered by the College of Humanities ==
As of November 2022, there are over 30 degrees offered by the College of Humanities. Undergraduate programs offered include:

- American Studies BA
- Arabic Language BA
- Art History and Curatorial Studies BA
- Chinese BA
- Classical Studies: Classical Civilization BA
- Classical Studies: Classics BA
- Classical Studies: Greek Emphasis BA
- Classical Studies: Latin Emphasis BA
- Comparative Literature BA
- Editing and Publishing BA
- English BA
- English Teaching BA
- French BA
- French Studies BA (Secondary Major)
- French Teaching BA
- German Studies BA
- German Teaching BA
- German: Linguistics BA
- German Literature, Film, and Culture BA
- Interdisciplinary Humanities BA
- Italian BA
- Italian Studies BA (Secondary Major)
- Japanese BA
- Korean BA
- Latin Teaching BA
- Linguistics BA
- Philosophy BA
- Portuguese BA
- Portuguese Studies BA (Secondary Major)
- Russian BA
- Spanish BA
- Spanish Studies BA (Secondary Major)
- Spanish Teaching BA
- Spanish Translation BA

== BYU Center for Language Studies ==
The BYU Center for Language Studies seeks to advance language learning and the accompanying necessary cultural understanding. It largely functions as the planning arm for the BYU College of Humanities language acquisition classes. In total it coordinates classes aimed at learning 58 different languages, 12 of which have at least a minor if not a major program. The Center for Language Studies also operates the Foreign Language Student Residences. The work of this Center is closely connected with the Mary Lou Fulton Chair of World Languages.

Among faculty directly under the Center for Language Studies was at one time Amram Musungu who was also a member of the Mormon Tabernacle Choir. Musungu was an instructor in Swahili. He has since returned to Kenya where he is running for president.

== BYU English Language Center ==
The BYU English Language Center is a Laboratory School operated by the BYU Department of Linguistics and English Language, which is a sub-division of the College of Humanities. The School admits non-English speaking students of college age for intensive courses in English. The main point of the school is to provide experience for and training for students in the English as a Second Language Program at BYU.

== BYU Summer Language Institute ==
This is one of BYU's open enrollment summer programs. Since all BYU spring and summer term enrollment is open this is technically not exceptional. However this program is specifically designed to make the wide range of courses taught on BYU campus available for students who enroll during the summer.

== BYU Center for Teaching and Learning ==
The BYU Center for Teaching and Learning seeks to develop better teaching skills on the part of the faculty. It provides confidential, individual consultations to assist professors in improving their teaching skills. The center was formed in early 2007 to work towards of improved teaching at the university recommended by BYU's accrediting organization.

== Notable people ==
- Janis Nuckolls is an American anthropological linguist and professor of linguistics and English language. She spent many years doing field research with a primary focus on the Quechua people in Amazonian Ecuador and their endangered language.
