= The End of America =

The End of America may refer to:

== Media ==
- The End of America: Letter of Warning to a Young Patriot, 2007 non-fiction politics book by Naomi Wolfe about dictatorship and constitutionalism
- The End of America (film), 2008 documentary film based on the eponymous book by Naomi Wolfe, covering the G. W. Bush administration

== Geography ==
- List of extreme points of the United States
  - List of extreme points of U.S. states and territories
- Extreme points of the Americas

== See also ==
- Mutual assured destruction, nuclear-deterrence policy by enabling the destructive end of the United States and the Soviet Union
- End of the world (disambiguation)
