= Robert Friedman =

Robert Friedman may refer to:

- Robert I. Friedman (1950–2002), American investigative journalist
- Robert Friedman (producer) (born 1956), businessman in the entertainment industry
