= Surviving Jeffrey Epstein =

American documentary television miniseries

- Genre: Documentary
- Directed by: Anne Sundberg; Ricki Stern
- Composer: Bleeding Fingers Music
- Original language: English
- No. of seasons: 1
- No. of episodes: 4

Production
- Executive producers: Gena McCarthy; Robert Friedman; Shura Davison; Mike Powers; Megan Lawrence
- Producers: Ricki Stern; Anne Sundberg; Celia Aniskovich; Robin Espinola; Abbie Harper
- Cinematography: Jonathan Nastasi
- Editors: Victoria Toth; Denali Tiller; Rich Campbell; Sinead Kinnane; Dena Mermelstein; Kimberly Tomes; Emily Williams; Bobby Zeleny
- Running time: 44-51 minutes
- Production companies: Bungalow Media + Entertainment; Break Thru Films

Original release
- Network: Lifetime
- Release: August 9 – August 10, 2020

Surviving Jeffrey Epstein is an American documentary television miniseries about convicted sex offender Jeffrey Epstein, directed by Anne Sundberg and Ricki Stern. It consists of 4 episodes and premiered on August 9, 2020, on Lifetime.

== Plot ==
The documentary series follows convicted sex offender Jeffrey Epstein who used his power and finances to shield his predatory behavior. Eight survivors share their stories in the documentary. Courtney Wild, Rachel Kay Benavides, and Virginia Roberts Giuffre appear in the series, along with new victims who chose to come forward for the first time. The series continued filming close to the release date in order to include the FBI arrest of British socialite and Epstein co-conspirator Ghislaine Maxwell on July 2, 2020.

== Episodes ==
No.	Title	Directed by	Original release date	Viewers (millions)
1	"Lured"	Ricki Stern & Anne Sundberg	August 9, 2020	0.68
Several survivors detail their stories of Jeffrey Epstein, the mysterious billionaire living in Palm Beach, Florida, who as young teenagers were lured to his home by female recruiters they thought they could trust.
2	"Trapped"	Ricki Stern & Anne Sundberg	August 9, 2020	0.69
More survivors recount their stories with Epstein, going inside Epstein's insidious sex trafficking scheme.
3	"No Way Out"	Ricki Stern & Anne Sundberg	August 10, 2020	0.53
Epstein survivors recount their stories with Epstein on his private island, where some of the most horrific abuses took place.
4	"Avenged"	Ricki Stern & Anne Sundberg	August 10, 2020	0.49
With Epstein dead, survivors continue to pursue justice, finally seeing a glimmer of hope with the arrest of Ghislaine Maxwell.

== Production ==
In July 2019, it was announced Anne Sundberg and Ricki Stern would direct the documentary, with Robert Friedman set to produce the series under his Bungalow Media + Entertainment banner, to premiere on Lifetime. In January 2020, Lifetime greenlit the series.

== Broadcast ==
In the United States, the series premiered on August 9, 2020, with back-to-back episodes before concluding on August 10 on Lifetime. In the United Kingdom, the series premiered on August 25, 2020, with back-to-back episodes before concluding on August 26, on Crime & Investigation.

== Reception ==
=== Critical response ===
On Metacritic, the series has a weighted average score of 76 out of 100, based on 4 critics, indicating "generally favorable reviews".

=== Impact ===
The National Sexual Assault Hotline in the United States, operated by the Rape, Abuse & Incest National Network (RAINN), experienced a 34% increase in calls during the airing of the documentary.

== See also ==
- Jeffrey Epstein: Filthy Rich
- Surviving R. Kelly
