= Hu Fu =

Hu Fu may refer to:

- Tiger tally, or hu fu
- Hu Fo, or Hu Fu, Taiwanese political scientist

== See also ==
- Hufu
- Hufu (novelty item)
