= Knuckleball! =

2012 documentary film about baseball

- Directed by: Ricki Stern; Anne Sundberg
- Produced by: Dan Cogan, Christine Schomer, Ricki Stern, Annie Sundberg
- Starring: Tim Wakefield; R. A. Dickey
- Music by: Paul Brill
- Distributed by: Amelia & Theo Films, FilmBuff
- Release dates: April 21, 2012 (New York city); September 20, 2012 (United States)
- Running time: 93 minutes
- Country: United States
- Language: English

Knuckleball! is a 2012 documentary film that follows the 2011 seasons of Tim Wakefield and R. A. Dickey, Major League Baseball's only knuckleball pitchers that year. It was released in theaters on September 20, 2012, and on DVD on April 2, 2013. Wakefield won his 200th game in 2011 and Dickey won the 2012 Cy Young Award.

== Background ==
Stern and Sundberg's previous documentary was Joan Rivers: A Piece of Work. They had also previously directed the documentary The Devil Came on Horseback about the War in Darfur.

== Plot ==
The film sets up the 2011 season by showing how the knuckleball saved both pitchers from obscurity. Dickey moved his family 37 times before landing with the New York Mets. The film presents Wakefield's chase of his 200th win as a member of the 2011 Red Sox and Dickey's make-it-or-break-it season with the 2011 Mets. It demonstrates the fraternal nature of knuckleball pitchers who trade tips of the trade via various meetings with the likes of Phil Niekro and Charlie Hough. Dickey won the Cy Young Award in November 2012.

== Cast ==
- Tim Wakefield
- R. A. Dickey
- Phil Niekro
- Charlie Hough
- Jim Bouton
- Wilbur Wood
- Tom Candiotti
- Terry Collins
- Joe Torre
- Terry Francona
- Jim Leyland
- Jason Varitek
- Doug Mirabelli
- Josh Thole
- Gary Sheffield
- Carlos Beltran

== Reception ==
On the review aggregator website Rotten Tomatoes, 93% of 17 critics' reviews are positive, with an average rating of 6.8/10. On Metacritic the film scored 73 out of 100 based on 9 reviews.

Neil Genzlinger of The New York Times, noted that the film's release coincided with Dickey's Cy Young run, which made the "first-rate sports documentary" especially sweet. The Boston Globe's Ty Burr said "The movie's a must for baseball fans in general and Red Sox fans in particular". Even the film's harshest critics such as Time Out's David Fear says "Viewers who can’t get enough of ESPN's "30 for 30" docs will lap up this dual portrait", but continued to say that "Nonfans, however, are about to find out exactly what the phrase inside baseball means."

== See also ==
- List of baseball films
