= Nuckols (surname) =

Nuckols is a surname. Notable people with the surname include:

- Charles Nuckols Jr. (c.1922–2005), horse breeder; breeder of champions including Decathlon, Typecast, White Skies, Broadway Dancer, Habitat, No Le Hace, and Triple Crown contender War Emblem.
- Mark Nuckols (fl. 2012), American writer and regular commentator on Russian television
- Patricia Kenworthy Nuckols (1921–2022), American field hockey player and a pilot in the Women Airforce Service Pilots (WASP) during World War II

== See also ==
- Nuckolls (disambiguation), a list of people with the surname and a few places
