= Nuckolls =

Nuckolls may refer to:

== People ==
- Hugh Paul Nuckolls (1941–2023), American politician
- James Nuckolls (1938–1987), American lighting designer, author and educator
- Janis Nuckolls, American anthropological linguist and professor
- John Nuckolls (born 1930), American physicist
- Stephen Friel Nuckolls (1825–1879), American politician
- William T. Nuckolls (1801–1855), American politician

== Places in the United States ==
- Nuckolls, West Virginia, an unincorporated community
- Nuckolls County, Nebraska

== See also ==
- Nuckols (disambiguation)
