= Keli Goff =

American journalist, screenwriter (born 1979)

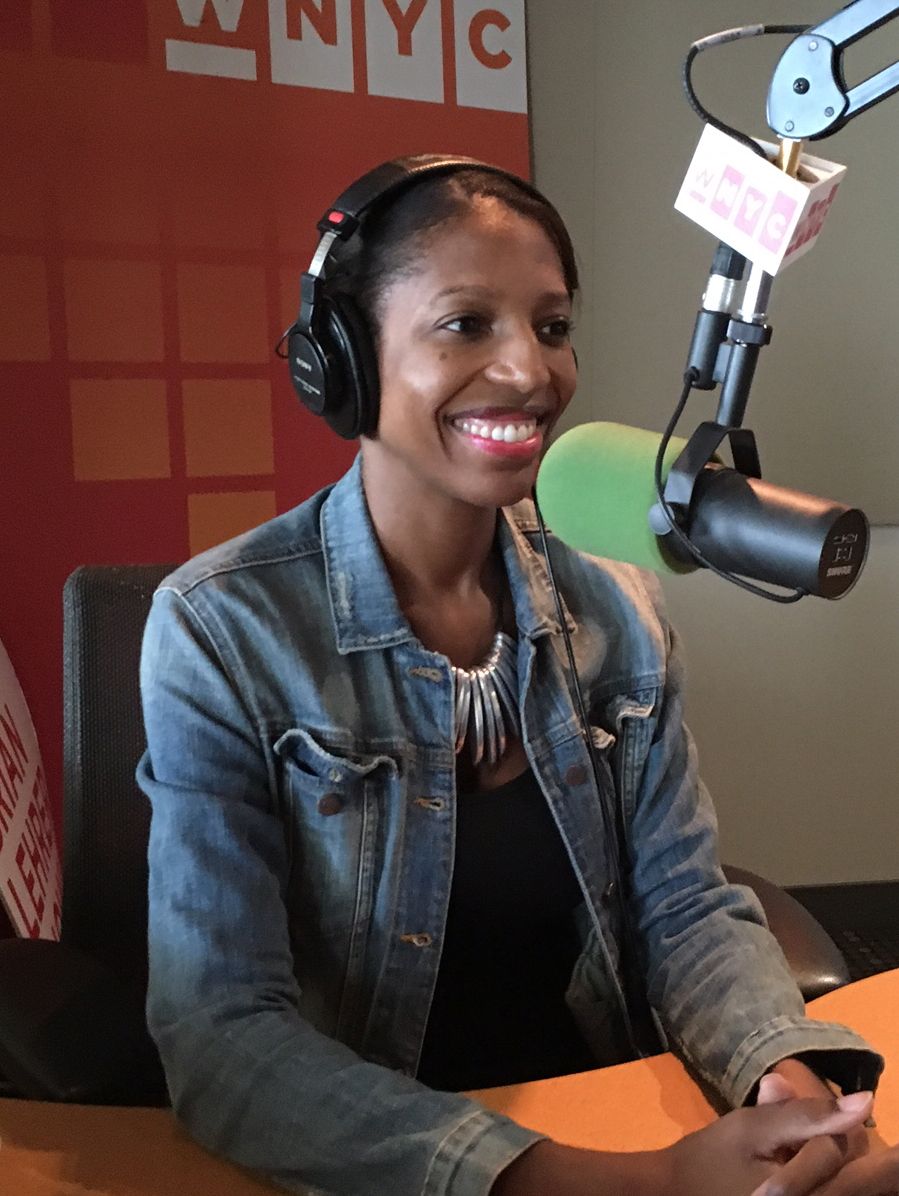
- Born: July 20, 1979 (age 47); Houston, Texas, U.S.
- Education: New York University (BA); Columbia University (MS)
- Occupations: Journalist, screenwriter
- Years active: 2008-present
- Awards: 2016 NAACP Image Award (Won), 2019 News & Documentary Emmys (Nominated-2)
- Website: www.keligoff.com

Keli Goff (born July 20, 1979) is an American producer, playwright, screenwriter, journalist and collector. She is a contributor to various news outlets and has written for a number of popular television shows, including And Just Like That..., the reboot of the television series Sex and the City, and Mayor of Kingstown.

A longtime contributor and fill-in guest host for public radio's Left, Right & Center, in 2023, Goff began writing a column for The Hollywood Reporter interviewing political leaders about Hollywood.

In 2026, an exhibition titled, "Collecting in Color: Highlights from the Keli Goff Collection," was announced by the Houston Museum of African American Culture.

== Early life ==
Originally from Missouri City, Texas, Goff graduated from Elkins High School. She earned a bachelor's degree from New York University and a master's degree in strategic communications from Columbia University.

== Early career as a journalist and author ==
Goff first came to prominence with the publication of her first book, Party Crashing: How the Hip-Hop Generation Declared Political Independence, which examined the perspectives and impact of younger voters and members of the Post Civil Rights Generation on the political process, with particular focus on the 2008 election. The book was notable for containing interviews with younger black voters as well as leaders like Colin Powell and Rev. Al Sharpton. The book resulted in Goff becoming a regular presence on cable news (MSNBC, CNN, FOX) during the 2008 presidential election. She also became a Contributor, covering major events of the election cycle such as the Democratic Convention and election night, on air for BET.

Goff also became a blogger for The Huffington Post. She then became a regular Contributor or Correspondent for various outlets including The Root, The Washington Post blog, "She the People," and eventually The Daily Beast, where she remains a Contributor as of 2021. Her writing was also published in a variety of magazines, including Time, Essence and Cosmopolitan.

Her essay "Living the Dream" is featured in the collection The Speech: Race and Barack Obama's A More Perfect Union in 2009.

In 2011 her first novel, The GQ Candidate, about a group of friends rocked by the decision of one of them to run for president, was published.

== Transition to playwriting, screenwriting and producing ==
In 2013 Goff began working on her first documentary, interviewing pro-life and pro-choice activists about the history of reproductive policy in America. That film would eventually become Reversing Roe, released on Netflix (along with a brief theatrical run) in September 2018. In 2019 Goff, along with directors/fellow producers Ricki Stern and Annie Sundberg, would go on to be nominated for two News/Documentary Emmy Awards for their work on the film.

In 2014, Goff was named one of The Public Theater’s Emerging Writers Group fellows. Her play, completed for the fellowship, had readings at various theaters. She also had plays workshopped at Crossroads Theater and LAByrinth Theater Company.

In 2014, she was hired to work as a writer on the drama series Being Mary Jane, about a black female cable news anchor. She won a 2016 NAACP Image Award for her writing for the series.

In 2017, Goff began writing for The CW television series Black Lightning based on the DC Comics superhero.

In 2019, she served as a writer and producer for the television series Twenties, produced by Emmy winner Lena Waithe.

== Recent career ==
In 2016, she hosted Political Party, a series of specials covering the 2016 election for NPR affiliate, WNYC.

From 2019 to 2021, Goff's columns, articles, and essays have appeared in The Guardian, Vogue, The Hollywood Reporter, The Nation and Town & Country.

In 2020, Goff served as a writer and producer on Joe vs. Carole, the miniseries inspired by The Tiger King, starring Kate McKinnon.

In 2021, Center Stage in Baltimore produced (via streaming, due to the pandemic) Goff's play, The Glorious World of Crowns, Kinks & Curls a collection of scenes and monologues about the relationship between black women and their hair.

In 2021, Goff was also announced as a writer and producer on And Just Like That..., the reboot of the series, Sex and the City. Goff worked as a co-executive producer on the second season of the Paramount+ series Mayor of Kingstown.

During winter 2023, she was an artist-in-residence at Yaddo.

In 2024 the fashion label Anne Klein hired Goff to write an Impact campaign starring supermodel Kate Upton.

== Appearances in popular culture and public persona ==
Goff and her work have been covered in publications such as USA Today, Politico and Vanity Fair. Early in her journalism career Goff made hundreds of TV appearances on MSNBC, FOX News Channel, CNN and the BBC among others, and even appeared in a cameo as a political pundit on Being Mary Jane before becoming a writer for the show. During a May 2021 appearance as a storyteller at The Moth, Goff disclosed that she prefers screenwriting and appearing on radio versus appearing on television, because she did not enjoy the overemphasis on her appearance, including her hair, during her TV career. (She also touched upon this in an April 2021 piece for Vogue.). An October 9, 2020 appearance on Real Time with Bill Maher marked a rare on camera appearance for Goff, though she continues to appear on air as a Contributor to various NPR affiliates.

For much of her career, Goff was known for her devotion to using a Blackberry, something she referenced in interviews, writing projects and occasionally on social media. It was noted, however, in a 2025, Essence profile that she maintains an extremely limited social media presence, having never posted on Instagram, or similar platforms, at the time the profile was published.

== Fashion Writing and Collecting ==
Goff has written about fashion for various outlets, including New York magazine and Town & Country and in recent years has become notable as a prominent collector specializing in historically significant fashion. A 2023 profile in The Hollywood Reporter chronicled the scope of Goff's collection, with pieces by Ann Lowe, the designer of Jackie Kennedy's famed wedding gown, and Elizabeth Keckley, a former slave turned dressmaker for First Lady Mary Todd Lincoln, represented among her extensive archive of vintage clothing and African American fashion memorabilia. Some pieces from Goff's vintage collection are housed at the Fashion Institute of Technology, as well as the Texas Fashion Collection, while others have been exhibited at various institutions.

A 2025 pop-up exhibit at the University of North Texas, celebrating Goff's contributions to the Texas Fashion Collection, featured designs by Bill Blass, Tracy Reese, Chester Weinberg and others, donated by her. Later that year one of her many pieces by famed designer Patrick Kelly was featured in Pratt's "Black Dress II" at the Institute's Manhattan gallery. The exhibition, and Goff's involvement, were covered in the publications Vogue and Town & Country. In a 2025 profile in Essence, Goff revealed that at the urging of her friends in the curatorial world, she had begun taking art appraiser classes as part of her journey as a collector. In an October 2025 profile in Forbes it was revealed that Goff had donated pieces by the designers Stephen Burrows and Patrick Kelly to the Victoria and Albert Museum in London. The article noted that her donations marked the first acquisitions of pieces by the two designers, who are widely considered America's most famed Black designers, in the institution's history. In 2026, the Houston Museum of African American Culture announced that "Collecting in Color," an exhibition devoted to the collection of Goff, a Houston native, would run from October through December of that year. A 2026 article on the exhibition in Elle Magazine revealed that Goff had been selected by the estate of the late Academy Award winning costumer, Edith Head, to bring Head's biopic to the screen.

Essence Magazine reported that Goff lent one of her vintage Stephen Burrows evening gowns, to actress Keke Palmer to wear as a tribute to Burrows and his role in "The Battle of Versailles," during the November 2026 CFDA Awards.
