= Hufu (novelty item) =

Human meat flavored tofu product

Hufu was a joke product marketed as tofu designed to resemble human flesh in taste and texture. The tongue-in-cheek Hufu website was in existence from May 2005 to June 2006. The creators claimed that Milla Jovovich coined the term after hearing about the product's development while on a Eurostar train from London to Paris.

== History ==
Hufu was touted as "the healthy human flesh alternative" for "cannibals who want to quit", as well as a product for anthropology students studying cannibalism. According to its website, hufu is also "a great convenience food for cannibals. No more Friday night hunting raids! Stay home and enjoy the good healthy taste of hufu."

Mark Nuckols (founder and CEO of Hufu, LLC)—then a student at Tuck School of Business—claimed that the concept of Hufu occurred to him when he ate a tofurkey sandwich while reading "Good To Eat: Riddles of Food and Culture", a book on cannibalism by anthropologist Marvin Harris. Nuckols is also an honors JD graduate of Georgetown University Law Center.

Alongside a shopping portal for the joke product itself and merch items like T-shirts and DVDs, the website included recipes attributed to Aztec and Papua New Guinea foodways in which either Hufu or human flesh could be used.

== Reaction ==
Samantha Bee of The Daily Show interviewed Nuckols. In the interview, he said "I think that a lot of the pleasure of eating the Hufu product, is imagining you're eating human flesh. For that moment, you can join the fraternity of cannibals... If you really want to come as close as possible to the experience of cannibalism, Hufu is your best option." Nuckols was also interviewed by a variety of radio and print media, including The Harvard Crimson and The Stanford Daily. Stuff You Should Know, a podcast from HowStuffWorks.com, touched on Hufu during the introduction of the "How the Donner Party Worked" episode in March 2012.

It has been argued that Hufu presented consumers with a way of circumventing both the taboo and the illegality of eating human flesh. Others have commented on how Hufu's branding made it unclear whether the product was meant to be a true substitute for eating human flesh, or merely a novelty substitute for animal flesh, like other vegetarian meat-like products. In response to public skepticism, Nuckols has gone on the record calling his product a "bona fide undertaking."

== Closure of site ==
The Hufu home page eathufu.com closed as of mid-2006. According to Mark Nuckols, he closed the website simply because "the world has moved on past hufu, and the site was more expensive to run than it was worth." The web design studio that created the site maintains a case history illustrating the design concepts that were present in the site.
