= Reversing Roe =

2018 American documentary on abortion laws in America

- Promotional release poster
- Directed by: Ricki Stern; Anne Sundberg
- Produced by: Keli Goff; Anne Sundberg; Ricki Stern
- Starring: Donna Howard; John Seago; Brigitte Amiri; Troy Newman; Colleen McNicholas
- Cinematography: Charles Miller
- Edited by: Ben Gold
- Music by: Paul Brill
- Production companies: Lincoln Square Productions; UnbeliEVAble Entertainment; Break Thru Films
- Distributed by: Netflix
- Release date: September 13, 2018 (Netflix)
- Running time: 99 minutes
- Country: United States
- Language: English

Reversing Roe is a 2018 American documentary film directed by Ricki Stern and Anne Sundberg. Through interviews, the film analyzes the abortion laws in the United States and the effects of the 1973 Roe v. Wade case. The film is internationally distributed by Netflix, where it was released on September 13, 2018.

== Synopsis ==
Documentarists Ricki Stern and Anne Sundberg interview several politicians, experts, and activists about the state of the abortion politics in the United States and about the 1973 U.S. Supreme Court's landmark decision Roe v. Wade.

== Cast ==
- Donna Howard
- John Seago
- Brigitte Amiri
- Troy Newman
- Colleen McNicholas
- Linda Greenhouse
- Tom Davis

== Release ==
=== Reception ===
Reversing Roe was worldwide released on September 13, 2018, on Netflix. Upon its release, the film received universal acclaim by the critics. On review aggregator Rotten Tomatoes, Reversing Roe has an approval rating of 88% based on eight reviews. Metacritic, which uses a weighted average, assigned a score of 70 out of 100, based on 4 critics, indicating "generally favorable reviews".

Robert Abele of the Los Angeles Times wrote: "As contentiousness turned into real-world consequences, Reversing Roe reminds us that the more women get involved regarding their rights, the more likely we're to see a fair, principled fight". Ben Kenigsberg of The New York Times stated that the film "provides a clear and accessible overview of more than 50 years of the social and legal history of the issue in the United States". Brian Lowry, writing for CNN, was more critical towards the film, stating: "While the documentary sheds welcome light on Roe's history—on the road that brought us to this crucial juncture—the filmmakers, perhaps inevitably, bypassed some key stops and turns along the way."

Reversing Roe was nominated for an Emmy for Outstanding Politics and Government Documentary at the 40th News and Documentary Emmy Award.
