= Nic Dunlop =

- Born: 1969 (age 56–57); Ireland
- Occupations: Photographer, Author
- Known for: The Lost Executioner: A Story of the Khmer Rouge
- Awards: 2011 News & Documentary Emmy Award nomination

Nic Dunlop (born 1969) is a photographer and author.

== Early life and education ==
Dunlop was born in Ireland, lives in Bangkok, Thailand. He studied at the Central School of Art and Design in London.

== Career ==
=== Film director ===
Dunlop co-wrote and co-directed the HBO film Burma Soldier with Anne Sundberg, and Ricki Stern. The film was awarded the "Grand Jury Prize for Best Documentary" at the 2011 United Nations Association Film Festival, and Dunlop received a 2011 News & Documentary Emmy Award nomination for "Outstanding Individual Achievement in a Craft: Writing" for his writing.

=== Author and photographer ===
Dunlop co-authored War of the Mines (1994) with Paul Davies, about the devastation caused by landmines. His book The Lost Executioner: A Story of the Khmer Rouge (Bloomsbury, UK 2005; Walkerbooks, US 2006) was the result of a research supported by the Fund for Investigative Journalism. Dunlop exposed Kaing Guek Eav a.k.a. Comrade Duch, the former head of Democratic Kampuchea's dreaded special branch: the Santebal. Duch disappeared after the fall of the Khmer Rouge regime in 1979. In 1999, Dunlop tracked Duch to Samlaut, Cambodia, where Duch had been transferred as Director of Education. Several months later, Nate Thayer, who had previously interviewed Pol Pot and Ta Mok, accompanied Dunlop where they interviewed Duch for the Far Eastern Economic Review. Duch surrendered to the authorities in Phnom Penh following the publication of his interview. Duch was later tried and found guilty of War Crimes and Crimes Against Humanity becoming the first former Khmer Rouge to be tried and sentenced by the UN-backed tribunal in Phnom Penh, Cambodia. Dunlop received an award from the Johns Hopkins University for Excellence in International Journalism for exposing Duch. Dunlop spent 20 years photographing Burma's military regime (1992–2012). His book, Brave New Burma, a portrait of the country in pictures and words, was published in 2013.

He is currently working on a long-term project about the Battle of Aughrim (1691) in Galway, Ireland. A short version appeared in Granta magazine.
