= Naomi Wolf =

American feminist, journalist, and conspiracy theorist (born 1962)

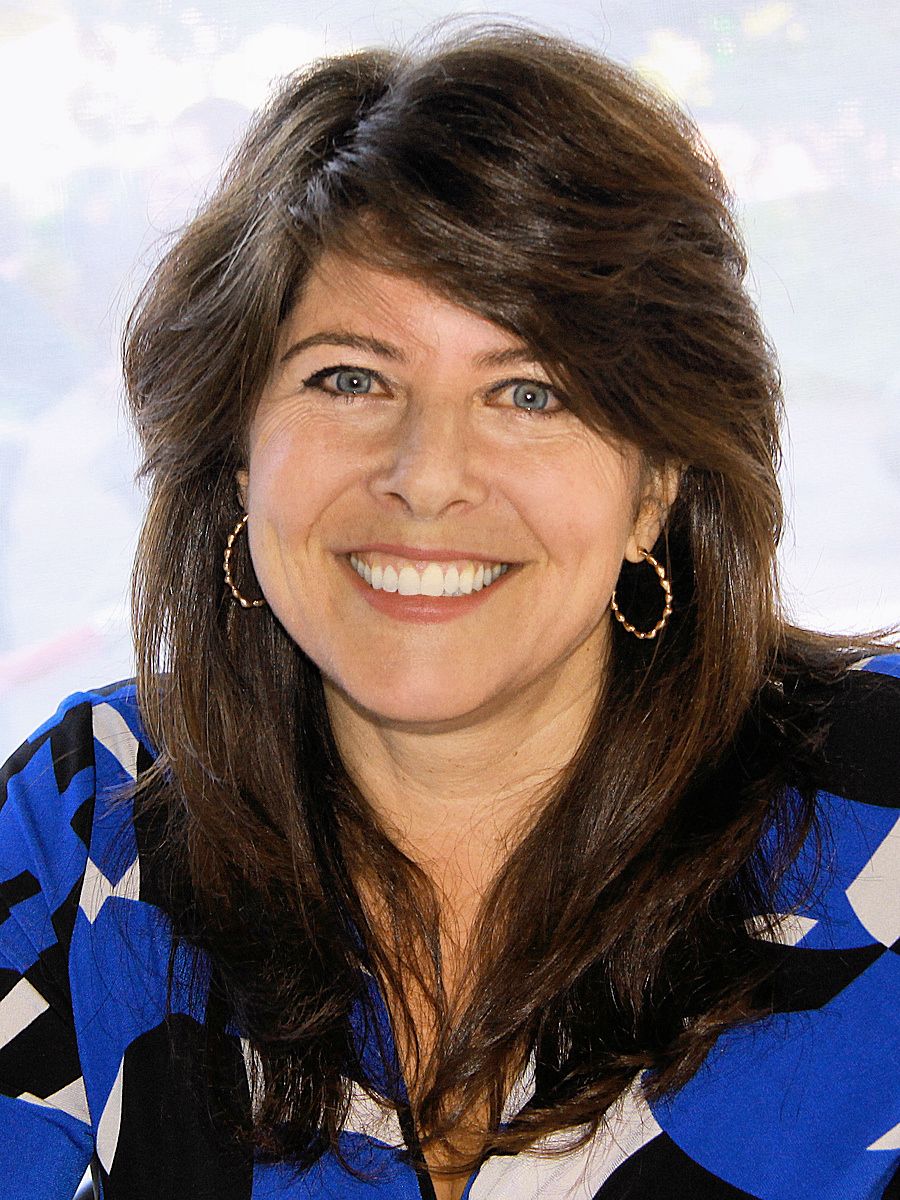
- Wolf in 2012
- Born: Naomi Rebekah Wolf; November 12, 1962 (age 64); San Francisco, California, U.S.
- Education: Yale University (BA); New College, Oxford (DPhil)
- Occupations: Author; political consultant; journalist
- Spouses: David Shipley (m. 1993; div. 2005) Brian O'Shea (m. 2018)
- Children: 2
- Writing career
- Notable works: The Beauty Myth (1991); The End of America (2007); Misconceptions (2001); Fire with Fire (1993); Outrages (2019)
- Website: dailyclout.io

Naomi Rebekah Wolf (born November 12, 1962) is an American feminist author, journalist, and conspiracy theorist. After the 1991 publication of her first book, The Beauty Myth, Wolf became a prominent figure in the third wave of the feminist movement. Feminists including Gloria Steinem and Betty Friedan praised her work. Others, including Camille Paglia, criticized it. In the 1990s, Wolf was a political advisor to the presidential campaigns of Bill Clinton and Al Gore.

Wolf's later books include the bestseller The End of America in 2007 and Vagina: A New Biography. Critics have challenged the quality and accuracy of her books' scholarship; her serious misreading of court records for Outrages (2019) led to its U.S. publication being canceled. Wolf's career in journalism has included topics such as abortion and the Occupy Wall Street movement in articles for media outlets such as The Nation, The New Republic, The Guardian, and The Huffington Post.

Since around 2014, Wolf has been described by journalists and media outlets as a conspiracy theorist. (Note: Sources describing Wolf as a "conspiracy theorist" or using related terms include: Boteach, Shmuely (September 10, 2014). "Naomi Wolf's allegations of an Israeli genocide fuel anti-Semitism". The Jerusalem Post. Archived from the original on March 29, 2021. "Naomi is so enmeshed with conspiracy theories that she even questions whether ISIS is a true threat."; Fisher, Max (October 5, 2014). "The insane conspiracy theories of Naomi Wolf". Vox. Archived from the original on March 20, 2021. "[I]t is important for readers who may encounter Wolf's ideas to understand the distinction between her earlier work, which rose on its merits, and her newer conspiracy theories, which are unhinged, damaging, and dangerous."; Brereton, Alex (October 6, 2014). "The line between conspiracy and scepticism is getting harder to draw – just ask Naomi Wolf". The Guardian. Archived from the original on April 28, 2021. "So Naomi Wolf thinks that the Isis beheading videos may not have been genuine. In a series of Facebook posts over the weekend that also included theories about an Ebola-driven military quarantine of US society and fake ballots in the Scottish referendum, she crossed over into conspiracy territory."; Ditum, Sarah (October 7, 2014). "Naomi Wolf is not a feminist who became conspiracy theorist – she's a conspiracist who was once right". New Statesman. London. Archived from the original on April 21, 2021. "Perhaps it's not that Wolf is a feminist who's degenerated into conspiracism, but instead that she's a conspiracy theorist who happened to fall into feminism first."; Moynihan, Michael (April 14, 2017) [October 11, 2014]. "From ISIS to Ebola, What Has Made Naomi Wolf So Paranoid?". The Daily Beast. Archived from the original on January 31, 2019. "Wolf's path from respectability to conspiracy theory isn't uncommon."; Aaronovitch, David (May 29, 2019). "Beware liberal attempts to rewrite history". The Times. Archived from the original on May 6, 2021. "She is furthermore a serial espouser of mad conspiracy theories, insisting on their plausibility in the face of overwhelming evidence"; Kreizman, Maris (June 14, 2019). "A Journey With Naomi Wolf". The New Republic. Archived from the original on May 9, 2021. "In 2014 she spread conspiracy theories including the belief that the beheading of two American journalists by ISIS was faked and staged."; Poole, Steven (October 9, 2019). "Permanent Record: Edward Snowden spies on the spies". New Statesman. London. Archived from the original on March 5, 2021. "'Chemtrails' are what conspiracy theorists, including the author Naomi Wolf, call the contrails of jet planes: rather than being harmless water vapour, they think they are deliberate sprays of noxious chemicals into the atmosphere, for reasons unclear."; Onion, Rebecca (March 30, 2021). "A Modern Feminist Classic Changed My Life. Was It Actually Garbage?". Slate. Archived from the original on April 1, 2021. "I can see this progression of Wolf's thinking in every Trump- and COVID-era conspiracy theorist, from Stop the Steal to QAnon, who, like Wolf, seems to favor a 'natural order' where their particular problems rank first. It goes from 'this sucks so much' to 'someone is surely pulling these strings' to 'guys—I found the someone!'"; "Fauci got $1 million from Israel, 'doesn't work for us,' conspiracist Naomi Wolf says on Fox News". Haaretz.com. April 20, 2021. Archived from the original on January 7, 2022. "Conspiracy theorist Naomi Wolf suggested that Dr. Anthony Fauci is beholden to Israel rather than serving the United States.") She has been criticized for posting misinformation on topics such as beheadings carried out by ISIS, the Western African Ebola virus epidemic, and Edward Snowden. Wolf has objected to COVID-19 lockdowns and criticized COVID-19 vaccines. In June 2021, her Twitter account was suspended for posting misinformation related to vaccination.

== Early life and education ==
Naomi Rebekah Wolf was born on November 12, 1962 in San Francisco, California, to a Jewish family. Her mother is Deborah Goleman Wolf, an anthropologist and the author of The Lesbian Community. Her father was Leonard Wolf, a Romanian-born scholar of gothic horror novels, faculty member at San Francisco State University, and Yiddish translator. Leonard Wolf died from Parkinson's disease on March 20, 2019. Wolf has a brother, Aaron, and a half-brother, Julius, from her father's earlier relationship; it remained a secret until Wolf was in her 30s.

Wolf attended Lowell High School and debated in regional speech tournaments as a member of the Lowell Forensic Society. She attended Yale University, receiving her Bachelor of Arts in English literature in 1984. From 1985 to 1987, she was a Rhodes Scholar at New College, University of Oxford. Wolf's initial period at Oxford University was difficult, as she experienced "raw sexism, overt snobbery and casual antisemitism". Her writing became so personal and subjective that her tutor advised against submitting her doctoral thesis. Wolf told interviewer Rachel Cooke, writing for The Observer, in 2019: "My subject didn't exist. I wanted to write feminist theory, and I kept being told by the dons there was no such thing." Her writing at this time formed the basis of her first book, The Beauty Myth.

Wolf ultimately returned to Oxford, completing her Doctor of Philosophy degree in English literature in 2015. Her thesis, supervised by Stefano Evangelista of Trinity College, formed the basis of her 2019 book Outrages: Sex, Censorship, and the Criminalization of Love. The thesis (which the journal Times Higher Education called "error-strewn") was subject to significant corrections of its scholarship, prompting several articles in the UK higher education press.

== Political consultant ==
Wolf was involved in President Bill Clinton's 1996 reelection bid, brainstorming with Clinton's team about ways to reach female voters. Hired by Dick Morris, she wanted Morris to promote Clinton as "The Good Father" and a protector of "the American house". She met with him every few weeks for nearly a year, according to the book Morris wrote about the campaign, Behind the Oval Office. Wolf managed to "persuade me to pursue school uniforms, tax breaks for adoption, simpler cross-racial adoption laws and more workplace flexibility." The advice she gave was without payment, Morris said in November 1999, as Wolf was fearful the knowledge of her involvement in the campaign might have negative consequences for Clinton.

During Al Gore's bid for the presidency in the 2000 election, Wolf was hired as a consultant. Her ideas and participation in the campaign generated considerable media coverage. According to a report by Michael Duffy and Karen Tumulty in Time, Wolf was paid a salary of $15,000 (by November 1999, $5,000) per month "in exchange for advice on everything from how to win the women's vote to shirt-and-tie combinations." Wolf's direct involvement in the Time article was unclear; she declined to be interviewed on the record.

In a New York Times interview with Melinda Henneberger, Wolf said she had been appointed in January 1999 and denied having advised Gore on his wardrobe. Wolf said she had mentioned the term "alpha male" only once in passing and that it "was just a truism, something the pundits had been saying for months, that the vice president is in a supportive role and the president is in an initiatory role…I used those terms as shorthand in talking about the difference in their job descriptions". Wolf told Katharine Viner of The Guardian in 2001: "I believe his agenda for women was a really historic agenda. I was honored to bring the concerns of women to Gore's table. I'm sorry that he didn't win and the controversy was worth it for me." She told Viner the men in Gore's campaign, at the equivalent level, were paid more than she was.

== Works ==
=== The Beauty Myth (1991) ===
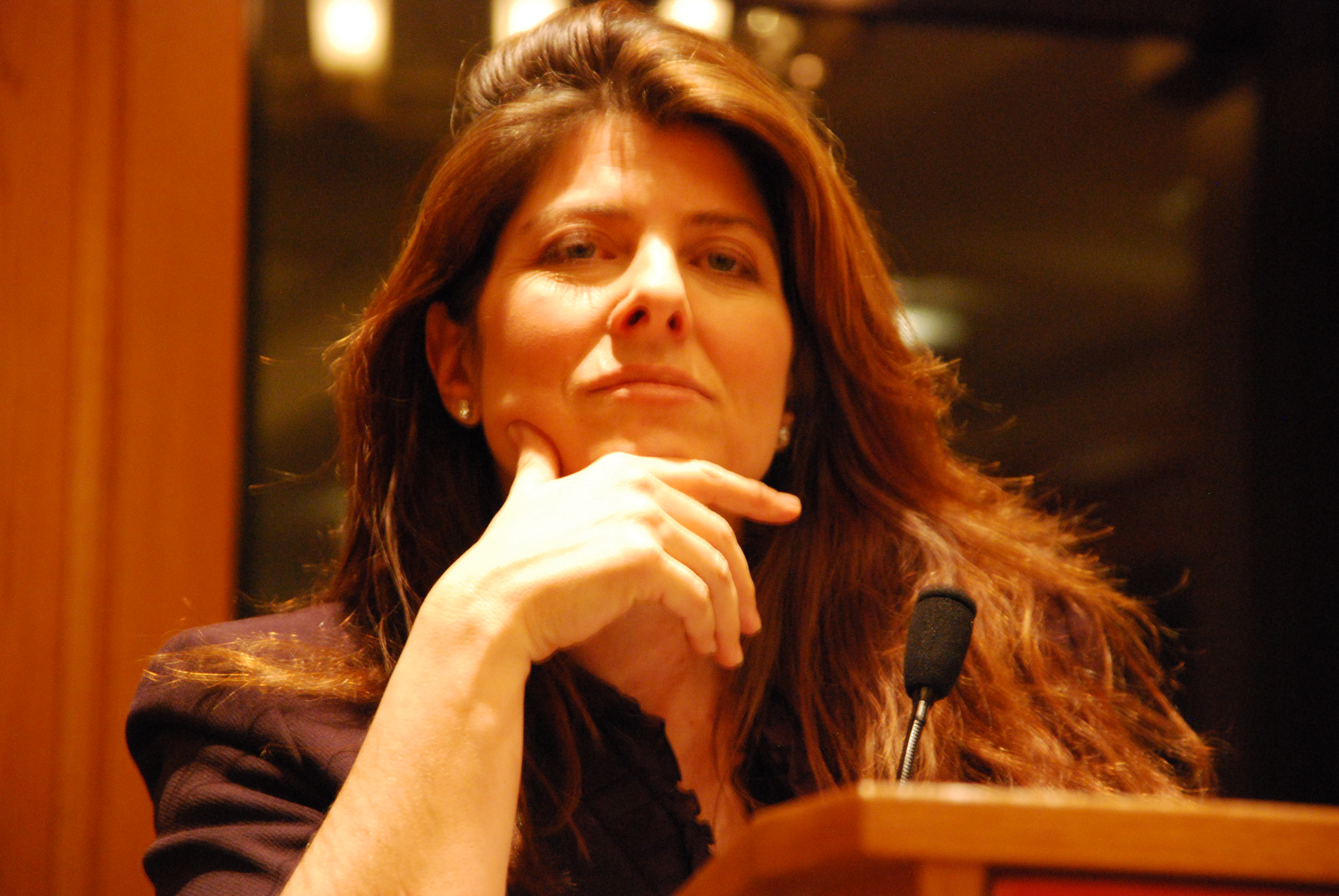
Wolf speaking at Brooklyn Law School, January 29, 2009

In 1991, Wolf gained international attention as a spokeswoman of third-wave feminism after the publication of her first book, The Beauty Myth, an international bestseller. The New York Times named it "one of the seventy most influential books of the twentieth century". She argues that "beauty" as a normative value is entirely socially constructed, and that the patriarchy determines the content of that construction with the objective to maintain women's subjugation.

Wolf proposes the concept of an "iron maiden", an intrinsically unreachable norm that is then used to physically and mentally punish women for failing to achieve and adhere to it. She condemns the fashion and beauty industries for exploiting women, but also writes that the beauty myth pervades all aspects of human life. Wolf believes that women should have "the freedom to do anything we choose with our faces and bodies without being penalized by an ideology that uses attitudes, economic pressure, and even legal judgments about women's looks to psychologically and politically destroy us." She claims that the "beauty myth" has targeted women in five areas: labor, religion, sex, violence, and hunger. Finally, Wolf advocates for a relaxation of conventional beauty norms. In her introduction, she scaffolds her work upon the achievements of second-wave feminists and offers the following analysis:

The more legal and material hindrances women have broken through, the more strictly and heavily and cruelly images of female beauty have come to weigh upon us ... [D]uring the past decade, women breached the power structure; meanwhile, eating disorders rose exponentially and cosmetic surgery became the fastest-growing specialty ... [P]ornography became the main media category, ahead of legitimate films and records combined, and thirty-three thousand American women told researchers that they would rather lose ten to fifteen pounds than achieve any other goal ... More women have more money and power and scope and legal recognition than we have ever had before; but in terms of how we feel about ourselves physically, we may actually be worse off than our unliberated grandmothers.

==== Accuracy ====
Christina Hoff Sommers criticized Wolf for publishing the estimate that 150,000 women were dying every year from anorexia. Sommers said she traced the source to the American Anorexia and Bulimia Association, which said it was misquoted; the figure refers to sufferers, not fatalities. Wolf's citation came from a book by Brumberg, who referred to an American Anorexia and Bulimia Association newsletter and misquoted the newsletter. Wolf acknowledged the error and changed it in future editions. Sommers gave an estimate for the number of fatalities in 1990 as 100–400. The annual anorexia casualties in the U.S. were estimated to be around 50 to 60 per year in the mid-1990s. In 1995, for an article in The Independent on Sunday, British journalist Joan Smith recalled asking Wolf to explain her unsourced assertion in The Beauty Myth that the UK "has 3.5 million anorexics or bulimics (95 per cent of them female), with 6,000 new cases yearly". Wolf replied, according to Smith, that she had calculated the statistics from patients with eating disorders at one clinic. Caspar Schoemaker of the Netherlands Trimbos Institute published a paper in the academic journal Eating Disorders demonstrating that of the 23 statistics cited by Wolf in Beauty Myth, 18 were incorrect.

==== Reception ====
Second-wave feminist Germaine Greer wrote that The Beauty Myth was "the most important feminist publication since The Female Eunuch" (Greer's own work), and Gloria Steinem wrote, "The Beauty Myth is a smart, angry, insightful book, and a clarion call to freedom. Every woman should read it." British novelist Fay Weldon called the book "essential reading for the New Woman". Betty Friedan wrote in Allure magazine that "The Beauty Myth and the controversy it is eliciting could be a hopeful sign of a new surge of feminist consciousness." Camille Paglia, whose Sexual Personae was published the same year as The Beauty Myth, derided Wolf as unable to perform "historical analysis" and called her education "completely removed from reality". These comments touched off a series of debates between Wolf and Paglia in the pages of The New Republic. Caryn James wrote in The New York Times:

No other work has so forcefully confronted the anti-feminism that emerged during the conservative, yuppified 1980's, or so honestly depicted the confusion of accomplished women who feel emotionally and physically tortured by the need to look like movie stars. Even by the standards of pop-cultural feminist studies, The Beauty Myth is a mess, but that doesn't mean it's wrong.

James also wrote that the book's "claims of an intensified anti-feminism are plausible, but Ms. Wolf doesn't begin to prove them because her logic is so lame, her evidence so easily knocked down." In The Washington Post, Marilyn Yalom called the book "persuasive" and praised its "accumulated evidence". Revisiting The Beauty Myth in 2019 for The New Republic, literary critic Maris Kreizman recalls that reading it as an undergraduate made her "world burst open", but as she matured, Kreizman saw Wolf's books as "poorly argued tracts" with Wolf making "wilder and wilder assertions" over time. Kreizman "began to write [Wolf] off as a fringe character" even though Wolf had "once informed my own feminism so deeply."

=== Fire with Fire (1993) ===
In Fire with Fire (1993), Wolf wrote about politics, female empowerment, and women's sexual liberation. She wished to persuade women to reject "victim feminism" in favor of "power feminism". She argued for diminishing the issue of opposing men, avoiding divisive issues such as abortion and the rights of lesbians, and considering more universal issues like violence against women, pay disparities and sexual harassment. Mary Nemeth wrote in Maclean's that her "central thesis—that when Anita Hill in 1991 accused U.S. Supreme Court nominee Clarence Thomas of sexual harassment she provoked a 'genderquake' that turned American women into 'the political ruling class'—seems grossly exaggerated." Melissa Benn in the London Review of Books called the book Wolf's "call for a realpolitik in which 'sisterhood and capital' might be allies".

Michiko Kakutani of The New York Times assailed Fire with Fire for its "dubious oversimplifications and highly debatable assertions" and its "disconcerting penchant for inflationary prose", but approved of Wolf's "efforts to articulate an accessible, pragmatic feminism, …helping to replace strident dogma with common sense." Time magazine reviewer Martha Duffy dismissed the book as "flawed", but wrote that Wolf was "an engaging raconteur" who was also "savvy about the role of TV—especially the Thomas-Hill hearings and daytime talk shows—in radicalizing women, including homemakers", characterizing the book as advocating an inclusive strain of feminism that welcomed abortion opponents. Feminist author Natasha Walter wrote in The Independent that the book "has its faults, but compared with The Beauty Myth it has energy and spirit, and generosity too." But Walter criticized it for having a "narrow agenda" where "you will look in vain for much discussion of older women, of black women, of women with low incomes, of mothers." Calling Wolf a "media star", Walter wrote: "She is particularly good, naturally, on the role of women in the media."

=== Promiscuities (1997) ===
Promiscuities (1997) reports on and analyzes the shifting patterns of contemporary adolescent sexuality. Wolf argues that literature is rife with examples of male coming-of-age stories, covered autobiographically by D. H. Lawrence, Tobias Wolff, J. D. Salinger, and Ernest Hemingway, and misogynistically by Henry Miller, Philip Roth and Norman Mailer, while female accounts of adolescent sexuality have been systematically suppressed. Schools, in Wolf's opinion, should teach their students "sexual gradualism", masturbation, mutual masturbation and oral sex, which she sees as a more credible approach than total abstinence and without the risks of full intercourse. Wolf uses cross-cultural material to try to demonstrate that women have, across history, been celebrated as more carnal than men. She also argues that women must reclaim the legitimacy of their sexuality by shattering the polarization of women between virgin and whore. Partly an account of her own sexual history, the book urges women to "redeem the slut in ourselves and rejoice in being bad girls".

Promiscuities generally received negative reviews. In The New York Times, Kakutani wrote that Wolf is "a frustratingly inept messenger: a sloppy thinker and incompetent writer" who "tries in vain to pass off tired observations as radical aperçus, subjective musings as generational truths, sappy suggestions as useful ideas". Of Wolf's claims about accounts of female sexuality being suppressed, Kakutani wrote: "Where has Ms. Wolf been? What about the raunchy confessions that surface daily on radio and television talk shows? What about all the memoirists—from Anais Nin to Kathryn Harrison?" Two days earlier in the Times, Weaver Courtney praised the book: "Anyone—particularly anyone who, like Ms. Wolf, was born in the 1960s—will have a very hard time putting down Promiscuities. Told through a series of confessions, her book is a searing and thoroughly fascinating exploration of the complex wildlife of female sexuality and desire." In contrast, The Library Journal excoriated the book, writing, "Overgeneralization abounds as she attempts to apply the microcosmic events of this mostly white, middle-class, liberal milieu to a whole generation. …There is a desperate defensiveness in the tone of this book which diminishes the force of her argument."

=== Misconceptions (2001) ===
"I feel absolutely staggered by what I discovered after giving birth", Wolf said at the time Misconceptions: Truth, Lies, and the Unexpected on the Journey to Motherhood was published. "Birth today is like agribusiness. It's like a chicken plant: they go in, they go out", she told Katharine Viner. "Pregnancy, birth and motherhood" has "made me a more radical feminist than I have ever been." The book draws heavily on Wolf's experience of her first pregnancy. She describes the "vacuous impassivity" of the ultrasound technician who gives her the first glimpse of her new baby. Wolf laments her C-section and examines why the procedure is common in the U.S., advocating a return to midwifery. The book's second half is anecdotal, focusing on inequalities between parents with respect to child care. In the section describing being on the operating table having a Caesarean, Wolf compares herself to Jesus at his crucifixion. She outlines a "mothers' manifesto", including flexi-time for both parents, neighborhood toy banks, and a radical mothers' movement.

In her New York Times review, Claire Dederer wrote that Wolf "barely pauses to acknowledge that Caesareans are, at times, a necessary and even lifesaving intervention" and that she does "her best writing when she's observing her own life" as a memoirist, calling Wolf's work in this idiom not "self-indulgent. It seems vital, and in a sense radical, in the tradition of 1970's feminists who sought to speak to every aspect of women's lives."

=== The Treehouse (2005) ===
Wolf's The Treehouse: Eccentric Wisdom from My Father on How to Live, Love, and See is an account of her midlife crisis. She revalues her father's love, and his role as an artist and a teacher during a year living in a house in upstate New York. In a promotional interview with The Herald, Wolf related her experience of a vision of Jesus: "just this figure who was the most perfected human being—full of light and full of love. …There was light coming out of him holographically, simply because he was unclouded."

=== The End of America (2007) ===
In The End of America: Letter of Warning to a Young Patriot, Wolf takes a historical look at the rise of fascism, outlining 10 steps necessary for a fascist group or government to destroy the democratic character of a nation-state. The book details how this pattern was implemented in Nazi Germany, Fascist Italy, and elsewhere, and analyzes its emergence and application of all 10 steps in American political affairs since the September 11 attacks. Alex Beam wrote in the International Herald Tribune (reprinted in The New York Times): "In the book, Wolf insists that she is not equating [George W.] Bush with Hitler, nor the United States with Nazi Germany, then proceeds to do just that." A month before the 2008 presidential election, she announced her intention to propose means to arrest Bush. "Americans are facing a coup, as of this morning, October 1st", she said in a radio interview. In 2013, Mark Nuckols argued in The Atlantic that Wolf's supposed historical parallels between incidents from the era of the European dictators and modern America are based on a highly selective reading in which Wolf omits significant details and misuses her sources. In The Daily Beast, Michael C. Moynihan called the book "an astoundingly lazy piece of writing".

The End of America was adapted for the screen as a documentary by filmmakers Annie Sundberg and Ricki Stern, best known for The Devil Came on Horseback and The Trials of Darryl Hunt. It premiered in October 2008, and was favorably reviewed in The New York Times by Stephen Holden, and also by Variety magazine. In the Financial Times Nigel Andrews wrote, "what isn't plausible or reality-related is the conclusion itself. At the door of the Third Reich, Wolf's credibility collapses." Moynihan called it "an even dumber documentary film" than the "dumb book". Interviewed by Alternet in 2010, Wolf compared some of President Barack Obama's actions to those of Nazi dictator Adolf Hitler as typical of dictatorships. Wolf returned to her The End of America theme in a Globe and Mail article in 2014, considering how modern Western women, born in inclusive, egalitarian liberal democracies, are assuming positions of leadership in neofascist political movements.

=== Give Me Liberty (2008) ===
Give Me Liberty: A Handbook for American Revolutionaries was written as a sequel to The End of America. The book looks at times and places in history where citizens faced the closing of an open society and successfully fought back.

=== Vagina: A New Biography (2012) ===
Vagina: A New Biography was much criticized, especially by feminist authors. Katie Roiphe called it "ludicrous" in Slate: "I doubt the most brilliant novelist in the world could have created a more skewering satire of Naomi Wolf's career than her latest book." In The Nation, Katha Pollitt called it a "silly book" containing "much dubious neuroscience and much foolishness." It becomes "loopier as it goes on. We learn that women think and feel through their vagina, which can 'grieve' and feel insulted."

Toni Bentley wrote in The New York Times Book Review that Wolf used "shoddy research methodology", while with "her graceless writing, Wolf opens herself to ridicule on virtually every page." Janice Turner in The Times wrote that since Mary Wollstonecraft, female "writers have argued that women should not be defined by biology", yet "Wolf, our self-styled leader, has declared that female consciousness, creativity and destiny all come back" to a woman's genitals. Los Angeles Times columnist Meghan Daum wrote: "By asserting that what's between a woman's ears is directly informed by what's between her legs—'the vagina mediates female confidence, creativity and sense of transcendence,' Wolf writes—it acts as a perverse echo of Republican efforts to limit reproductive rights." In the book, according to Suzanne Moore in The Guardian, "feminism becomes simply a highly mediated form of narcissism devoid of any actual brain/politics connection."

In The New York Review of Books, Zoë Heller wrote that the book "offers an unusually clear insight into the workings of her mystic feminist philosophy", that the part of the book about the history of the vagina's representation is "full of childlike generalizations", and that Wolf's understanding of science "is pretty shaky too". In an interview with The New York Times, Wolf rejected claims that she had written more freely than her sources could sustain. In The New York Observer, Nina Burleigh suggested that critics of the book were so vehement "because (a) their editors handed the book to them for review because they thought it was an Important Feminist Book when it's actually slight and (b) there's a grain of truth in what she's trying to say." In response to the criticism, Wolf said in a television interview:

Anything that shows documentation of the brain and vagina connection is going to alarm some feminists…also feminism has kind of retreated into the academy and sort of embraced the idea that all gender is socially constructed and so here is a book that is actually looking at science…though there has been some criticisms of the book from some feminists…who say, "well you can't look at the science because that means we have to grapple with the science"…to me the feminist task of creating a just world isn't changed at all by this fascinating neuroscience that shows some differences between men and women.

At a party organized to celebrate Wolf's publishing deal for this book, the male host invited guests to make pasta pieces shaped like vulvas. Wolf came to view this as mocking, and recounted feeling pressured to remain silent as the butt of a joke, something she said women often feel pressured to do. She said the incident resulted in her having writer's block for the next six months.

=== Outrages (2019) ===
Wolf's book Outrages: Sex, Censorship, and the Criminalization of Love was based on the 2015 doctoral thesis she completed under the supervision of literary scholar Stefano-Maria Evangelista, a Fellow of Trinity College, Oxford. It studies the repression of homosexuality in relation to attitudes toward divorce and prostitution, and also in relation to the censorship of books. Outrages was published in the UK in May 2019 by Virago Press. On June 12, 2019, Outrages appeared on O, The Oprah Magazine's list "The 32 Best Books by Women of Summer 2019". The next day, the U.S. publisher recalled all copies from U.S. bookstores. In a 2019 BBC radio interview, broadcaster and author Matthew Sweet identified an error in a central tenet of the book: a misunderstanding of the legal term "death recorded", which Wolf had taken to mean that the convict had been executed but in fact means that the convict was pardoned or the sentence was commuted. He cited a website for the Old Bailey Criminal Court, which Wolf had referred to in the interview as one of her sources. Reviewers have described other errors of scholarship in the work.

At the Hay Festival in Wales in May 2019, a few days after her exchange with Sweet, Wolf defended her book and said she had already corrected the error. At an event in Manhattan in June, she said she was not embarrassed and felt grateful to Sweet for the correction. On October 18, 2019, it became known that Houghton Mifflin Harcourt's release of the book in the U.S. was being canceled, with copies already printed and distributed being pulled and pulped. Wolf expressed hope that the book would still be published in the U.S.

In November 2020, Virago published a UK paperback edition of the book that removed the incorrect references to the execution of men for sodomy included in the hardback edition. Interviewed about the new edition, Sweet said that the book continues to misread historical sources: "Dr Wolf has misrepresented the experiences of victims of child abuse and violent sexual assault. This is the most profound offence against her discipline, as well as the memories of real people on the historical record". Cultural historian Fern Riddell called the book a "calumny against gay people" in the 19th century and said that Wolf "presents child rapists and those taking part in acts of bestiality as being gay men in consensual relationships and that is completely wrong". The Daily Telegraph reported that there had been calls for Wolf's 2015 Doctorate of Philosophy to be reexamined, and for Virago to withdraw the book. In a statement to The Guardian, Wolf said the book had been reviewed "by leading scholars in the field" and "it is clear that I have accurately represented the position". Oxford University stated that a "statement of clarification" to Wolf's thesis had been received and approved, and would be "available for consultation in the Bodleian Library in due course".

In March 2021, Times Higher Education reported that Wolf's original thesis remained unavailable six years after it was examined. Oxford doctoral graduates can request an embargo of up to three years, with the potential for renewal. The thesis finally became available in April 2021, with nine pages of corrections attached dealing with the misreading of historic criminal records. Wolf had submitted the thesis to the archive in December 2020, more than five years after her DPhil was awarded, and had requested a one-year extension to the embargo period so that she could seek legal advice. The extension request was declined. In university teaching, Outrages has been used as an example of the danger of misreading historical sources.

== Feminist issues ==
=== Abortion ===
In an October 1995 New Republic article, Wolf was critical of contemporary pro–choice positions, arguing that the movement had "developed a lexicon of dehumanization", and urged feminists to accept abortion as a form of homicide and defend the procedure within the ambiguity of this moral conundrum. She continued, "Abortion should be legal; it is sometimes even necessary. Sometimes the mother must be able to decide that the fetus, in its full humanity, must die."

Wolf concluded by speculating that in a world of "real gender equality", passionate feminists "might well hold candlelight vigils at abortion clinics, standing shoulder to shoulder with the doctors who work there, commemorating and saying goodbye to the dead." In a 2005 article for New York magazine on the subtle manipulation of George W. Bush's image among women, Wolf wrote: "Abortion is an issue not of Ms. Magazine-style fanaticism or suicidal Republican religious reaction, but a complex issue."

=== Pornography ===
In a 2003 New York magazine article, Wolf suggested that the ubiquity of internet pornography tends to enervate men's sexual attraction to real women. She wrote, "The onslaught of porn is responsible for deadening male libido in relation to real women, and leading men to see fewer and fewer women as 'porn-worthy.' Far from having to fend off porn-crazed young men, young women are worrying that as mere flesh and blood, they can scarcely get, let alone hold, their attention." Wolf advocated abstaining from porn not on moral grounds but because "greater supply of the stimulant equals diminished capacity."

=== Women in Islamic countries ===
Wolf has commented about the dress required of women living in Muslim countries. In 2008, she wrote in The Sydney Morning Herald, "The West interprets veiling as repression of women and suppression of their sexuality. But when I traveled in Muslim countries and was invited to join a discussion in women-only settings within Muslim homes, I learned that Muslim attitudes toward women's appearance and sexuality are not rooted in repression, but in a strong sense of public versus private, of what is due to God and what is due to one's husband. It is not that Islam suppresses sexuality, but that it embodies a strongly developed sense of its appropriate channeling—toward marriage, the bonds that sustain family life, and the attachment that secures a home."

== Other views ==
=== Conspiracy theories ===
In the January 2013 issue of The Atlantic, law and business professor Mark Nuckols wrote: "In her various books, articles, and public speeches, Wolf has demonstrated recurring disregard for the historical record and consistently mutilated the truth with selective and ultimately deceptive use of her sources." He added: "[W]hen she distorts facts to advance her political agenda, she dishonors the victims of history and poisons present-day public discourse about issues of vital importance to a free society." Nuckols argued that Wolf "has for many years now been claiming that a fascist coup in America is imminent. ... [I]n The Guardian she alleged, with no substantiation, that the U.S. government and big American banks are conspiring to impose a 'totally integrated corporate-state repression of dissent'."

In the same month, Charles C. W. Cooke wrote in National Review Online, "Over the last eight years, Naomi Wolf has written hysterically about coups and about vaginas and about little else besides. She has repeatedly insisted that the country is on the verge of martial law, and transmogrified every threat—both pronounced and overhyped—into a government-led plot to establish a dictatorship. She has made prediction after prediction that has simply not come to pass. Hers are not sober and sensible forecasts of runaway human nature, institutional atrophy, and constitutional decline, but psychedelic fever-dreams that are more typically suited to the InfoWars crowd."

Sarah Ditum wrote in the New Statesman, "Perhaps it's not that Wolf is a feminist who's degenerated into conspiracism, but instead that she's a conspiracy theorist who happened to fall into feminism first. The Beauty Myth is a conspiracy theory of a sort, and sometimes conspiracies are real: the self-replicating power structure of patriarchy is one of them."

=== Defense of Julian Assange ===
Shortly after Julian Assange was arrested in 2010, Wolf wrote in an article for The Huffington Post that the allegations two women made against him amounted to no more than bad manners from a boyfriend. His accusers, she later wrote in several contexts, were working for the CIA, and Assange had been falsely accused.

On December 20, 2010, Democracy Now! featured a debate between Wolf and Jaclyn Friedman on Assange's case. According to Wolf, the alleged victims should have said no, asserted that they consented to having sex with him, and said the claims were politically motivated and demeaned the cause of legitimate rape victims. In a 2011 Guardian article, she argued that the accuser in rape cases should not retain anonymity. She said anonymity in such cases was "a relic of the Victorian era" which "serves institutions that do not want to prosecute rapists ... this is particularly clear in the Assange case, where public opinion matters far more than usual". In The Nation, Katha Pollitt wrote that Wolf's argument was that anonymity "impedes law enforcement", which Pollitt said "is a little bizarre: doesn't Wolf realize that anonymity applies only to the media? Everyone in the justice system knows who the complainants are." Laurie Penny wrote in the New Statesman in September 2012 that "Wolf has done great damage by using her platform as one of the world's most famous feminists to dismiss these women's allegations."

=== Occupy Wall Street ===
On October 18, 2011, Wolf was arrested and detained in New York during the Occupy Wall Street protests, having ignored a police warning not to remain on the street in front of a building. She spent about 30 minutes in a cell. She disputed the NYPD's interpretation of applicable laws: "I was taken into custody for disobeying an unlawful order. The issue is that I actually know New York City permit law…I didn't choose to get myself arrested. I chose to obey the law and that didn't protect me."

A month later, Wolf argued in The Guardian, citing leaked documents, that attacks on the Occupy movement were a coordinated plot orchestrated by federal law enforcement agencies. Those leaks, she alleged, showed that the FBI was privately treating OWS as a terrorist threat rather than a peaceful organization. The response to this article ranged from praise to criticism of Wolf for being overly speculative and creating a conspiracy theory. Wolf responded that there was ample evidence for her argument, and proceeded to review the information available to her at the time of the article, and what she alleged was new evidence since that time.

Imani Gandy of Balloon Juice wrote that "nothing substantiates Wolf's claims", that "Wolf's article has no factual basis whatsoever and is, therefore, a journalistic failure of the highest order" and that "it was incumbent upon [Wolf] to fully research her claims and to provide facts to back them up." Corey Robin, a political theorist, journalist, and associate professor of political science at Brooklyn College and the Graduate Center of the City University of New York, wrote on his blog: "The reason Wolf gets her facts wrong is that she's got her theory wrong."

In a December 2012 Guardian article, Wolf wrote about FBI documents released following an FOIA request from the Partnership for Civil Justice Fund revealed that the FBI used counterterrorism agents and other resources to monitor the national Occupy movement extensively. The documents contained no references to agency personnel covertly infiltrating Occupy branches, but did indicate that the FBI gathered information from police departments and other law enforcement agencies relating to planned protests. Additionally, the blog Techdirt reported that the documents disclosed a plot by unnamed parties "to murder OWS leadership in Texas" but that "the FBI never bothered to inform the targets of the threats against their lives." Wolf wrote:

It was more sophisticated than we had imagined: new documents show that the violent crackdown on Occupy last fall [2011]—so mystifying at the time—was not just coordinated at the level of the FBI, the Department of Homeland Security, and local police. The crackdown, which involved, as you may recall, violent arrests, group disruption, canister missiles to the skulls of protesters, people held in handcuffs so tight they were injured, people held in bondage till they were forced to wet or soil themselves—was coordinated with the big banks themselves.

How simple…just to label an entity a 'terrorist organization' and choke off, disrupt or indict its sources of financing.

[The FBI crackdown on Occupy] was never really about 'the terrorists'. It was not even about civil unrest. It was always about this moment, when vast crimes might be uncovered by citizens—it was always, that is to say, meant to be about you.

Mother Jones claimed that none of the documents revealed efforts by federal law enforcement agencies to disband the Occupy camps, and that the documents did not provide much evidence that federal officials attempted to suppress protesters' free speech rights. Mother Jones said the truth was "a far cry from Wolf's contention."

=== Edward Snowden ===
In June 2013, New York magazine reported that Wolf, in a recent Facebook post, had expressed her "creeping concern" that NSA leaker Edward Snowden "is not who he purports to be, and that the motivations involved in the story may be more complex than they appear to be." Wolf was similarly skeptical of Snowden's "very pretty pole-dancing Facebooking girlfriend who appeared for, well, no reason in the media coverage ... and who keeps leaking commentary, so her picture can be recycled in the press." She wondered whether he was planted by "the Police State".

Wolf responded on her website: "I do find a great deal of media/blog discussion about serious questions such as those I raised, questions that relate to querying some sources of news stories, and their potential relationship to intelligence agencies or to other agendas that may not coincide with the overt narrative, to be extraordinarily ill-informed and naive." Of Snowden, she wrote, "Why should it be seen as bizarre to wonder, if there are some potential red flags—the key term is 'wonder'—if a former NSA spy turned apparent whistleblower might possibly still be—working for the same people he was working for before?" Salon accused Wolf of making factual errors and misreadings.

=== Islamic State executions and other assertions ===
In a series of Facebook posts in October 2014, Wolf questioned the authenticity of videos purporting to show beheadings of two American journalists and two Britons by the Islamic State, implying that they had been staged by the U.S. government and that the victims and their parents were actors. Wolf also charged that the U.S. was dispatching military troops not to assist in treating the Ebola virus epidemic in West Africa, but to carry the disease back home to justify a military takeover of the U.S. She further said that the 2014 Scottish independence referendum, in which Scotland voted to remain in the U.K., was faked. Speaking about this at a demonstration in Glasgow on October 12, Wolf said, "I truly believe it was rigged."

Responding to such criticism, Wolf said, "All the people who are attacking me right now for 'conspiracy theories' have no idea what they are talking about ... people who assume the dominant narrative MUST BE TRUE and the dominant reasons MUST BE REAL are not experienced in how that world works." Wolf posted, "I stand by what I wrote." But in a later Facebook post, she retracted her statement: "I am not asserting that the ISIS videos have been staged", she wrote.

I certainly sincerely apologize if one of my posts was insensitively worded. I have taken that one down. ... I am not saying the ISIS beheading videos are not authentic. I am not saying they are not records of terrible atrocities. I am saying that they are not yet independently confirmed by two sources as authentic, which any Journalism School teaches, and the single source for several of them, SITE, which received half a million dollars in government funding in 2004, and which is the only source cited for several, has conflicts of interest that should be disclosed to readers of news outlets.

Max Fisher commented that "the videos were widely distributed on open-source jihadist online outlets" while the "Maryland-based nonprofit SITE monitors extremist social media." Wolf deleted her original Facebook posts.

=== COVID-19 pandemic ===
During the COVID-19 pandemic, Wolf has frequently promoted COVID-19 misinformation, misinformation related to vaccination and 5G conspiracy theories. After Joe Biden was elected U.S. president, Wolf tweeted on November 9, 2020: "If I'd known Biden was open to 'lockdowns' as he now states, which is something historically unprecedented in any pandemic, and a terrifying practice, one that won't ever end because elites love it, I would never have voted for him." In February 2021, Wolf said on Fox News's Tucker Carlson Tonight that government COVID-19 restrictions were turning the U.S. "into a totalitarian state before everyone's eyes", adding, "I really hope we wake up quickly, because history also shows that it's a small window in which people can fight back before it is too dangerous to fight back."

In a March 2021 interview for Sky News Australia, Wolf claimed that lockdown policies are an "invention" of Chinese leader Xi Jinping. She also said that "Every human right in law is being violated", that Australians were being "lied to over and over", and that Australians were being psychologically tortured. On April 19, 2021, Wolf alleged that National Institute of Allergy and Infectious Diseases director Anthony Fauci, Biden's chief medical advisor, "doesn't work for us", claiming he had loyalties to Israel that interfered with service to public health. Wolf pointed to $1 million she said Fauci had received from Israel. It was actually the Dan David Prize, a private award Fauci received in 2021 for public service. Wolf further compared Fauci to Satan.

Wolf opposes COVID-19 vaccine passports, saying they represent "the absolute end of the line for human liberty in the West." She has frequently shared conspiracy theories about COVID-19 vaccines' safety and efficacy. In April 2021, she was instrumental in amplifying and spreading myths that the vaccines cause female infertility. Wolf's conspiratorial and anti-vaccine stance has been criticized as irresponsible, and she has also been the subject of ridicule.

Twitter suspended Wolf's account in June 2021, a decision the company said was permanent, according to the London Observer. Wolf's account was suspended apparently because she had repeatedly posted misinformation about COVID-19 and vaccines. Wolf had claimed that vaccines were a "software platform that can receive uploads" and suggested that vaccines let recipients "travel back in time" and that the urine and feces of those who received the COVID-19 vaccine should be separated from general sewage supplies to prevent them from contaminating drinking water. At the end of July 2021, The Daily Beast reported that Wolf was a co-plaintiff in former president Donald Trump's social media lawsuit. According to Wolf, Twitter's suspension of her account led her to lose "over half of her business model, investors in her business, and other sources of income."

Wolf appeared on the May 23, 2022, episode of The Charlie Kirk Show, where she said: "There are military-age men pouring over the border from places like Afghanistan and Ukraine. And the easiest thing in the world to send them to God knows where, you know, and to arm them to assist the World Health Organization." She argued that the Second Amendment made it harder for government to subjugate the population, but that it was possible. Wolf said, "I really hope that it doesn't devolve into civil war, which is really what the next thing is in history when you have an occupying force, which is what the WHO will be, you know, by next week."

In an October 2022 interview with UK TV channel GB News, Wolf said that COVID-19 vaccines are part of an effort "to destroy British civil society". Ofcom, the UK broadcasting regulatory agency, announced an investigation into GB News after receiving more than 400 complaints from members of the public and later found the channel in breach of broadcasting rules. In January 2023, Wolf appeared with Steve Bannon in his War Room show on Robert J. Sigg's Real America's Voice television network. They advertised a book titled Pfizer Documents Analysis Report that supposedly contained "50 reports using primary source Pfizer documents released under a court order by the U.S. Food and Drug Administration". The authors were not mentioned, but summarized as a team of 3,500 medical experts by the name of "The War Room/DailyClout Pfizer Documents Analysis Project". According to Wolf and Bannon, the book rips "the veneer off the myth that mRNA injections are safe and effective".

=== Martin Luther King Jr. ===
On September 7, 2024, Wolf posted to Twitter, "Rev MLK Jr was a convicted felon." In fact, King's only felony indictment was in February 1960, when an Alabama grand jury issued a warrant for his arrest for perjury. He was found not guilty. Wolf's false claim was subsequently "fact-checked into oblivion" by Community Notes. Bernice King, Martin Luther King Jr.'s youngest child, called Wolf's claim an attempt to "assassinate my father's character".

== Personal life ==
Wolf's first marriage was in 1993 to journalist David Shipley, then an editor at The New York Times. The couple had two children and divorced in 2005. On November 23, 2018, Wolf married Brian William O'Shea, a U.S. Army veteran, private detective, and owner of Striker Pierce Investigations. According to a November 2018 New York Times article, Wolf and O'Shea met in 2014 after people threatened Wolf on the internet for reporting on human rights violations in the Middle East and her contacts recommended O'Shea. Wolf is often confused with author Naomi Klein; this confusion is a major subject of Klein's 2023 book Doppelganger, to which Wolf did not contribute despite numerous attempts by Klein to contact her.

=== Alleged "sexual encroachment" incident at Yale ===
In a 2004 article for New York magazine, Wolf accused literary scholar Harold Bloom of a "sexual encroachment" in 1983 for touching her inner thigh. She said that what she alleged Bloom did was not harassment, either legally or emotionally, and she did not think herself a "victim", but that she had harbored this secret for 21 years. In a 2015 interview with Time, Bloom denied ever being indoors with "this person". Explaining why she had finally gone public with the charges, Wolf wrote:

I began, nearly a year ago, to try—privately—to start a conversation with my alma mater that would reassure me that steps had been taken in the ensuing years to ensure that unwanted sexual advances of this sort weren't still occurring. I expected Yale to be responsive. After nine months and many calls and e-mails, I was shocked to conclude that the atmosphere of collusion that had helped to keep me quiet twenty years ago was still intact—as secretive as a Masonic lodge. Sexual encroachment in an educational context or a workplace is, most seriously, a corruption of meritocracy; it is in this sense parallel to bribery. I was not traumatized personally, but my educational experience was corrupted. If we rephrase sexual transgression in school and work as a civil-rights and civil-society issue, everything becomes less emotional, less personal. If we see this as a systemic corruption issue, then when people bring allegations, the focus will be on whether the institution has been damaged in its larger mission.

In Slate magazine around the time the allegations against Bloom first surfaced, Meghan O'Rourke wrote that Wolf generalized about sexual assault at Yale on the basis of her alleged personal experience. Moreover, O'Rourke wrote, despite Wolf's assertion that sexual assault existed at Yale, she did not interview any Yale students for her story. In addition, O'Rourke wrote, "She jumps through verbal hoops to make it clear she was not 'personally traumatized,' yet she spends paragraphs describing the incident in precisely those terms." O'Rourke wrote that, despite Wolf's claim that her educational experience was corrupted, Wolf "neglects to mention that she later was awarded a Rhodes [scholarship]." O'Rourke concluded that the "gaps and imprecision" in Wolf's article "give fodder to skeptics who think sexual harassment charges are often just a form of hysteria."

Separately, a formal complaint was filed with the US Department of Education Office for Civil Rights on March 15, 2011, by 16 current and former Yale students—12 female and 4 male—describing a sexually hostile environment at Yale. A federal investigation of Yale University began in March 2011 in response to the complaints. In April, Wolf said on CBS's The Early Show, "Yale has been systematically covering up much more serious crimes than the ones that can be easily identified." More specifically, she alleged "they use the sexual harassment grievance procedure in a very cynical way, purporting to be supporting victims, but actually using a process to stonewall victims, to isolate them, and to protect the university." Yale settled the federal complaint in June 2012, acknowledging "inadequacies" but not facing "disciplinary action with the understanding that it keeps in place policy changes instituted after the complaint was filed. The school [was] required to report on its progress to the Office of Civil Rights until May, 2014."

In January 2018, Wolf accused Yale officials of blocking her from filing a formal grievance against Bloom. She told The New York Times that she had attempted to file the complaint in 2015 with Yale's University-Wide Committee on Sexual Misconduct, but that the university had refused to accept it. On January 16, 2018, Wolf said, she determined to see Yale's provost, Ben Polak, in another attempt to present her case. The newspaper reported, "As she documented on Twitter, she brought a suitcase and a sleeping bag, because she said she did not know how long she would have to stay. When she arrived at the provost's office, she said, security guards prevented her from entering any elevators. Eventually, she said, Aley Menon, the secretary of the sexual misconduct committee, appeared and they met in the committee's offices for an hour, during which she gave Ms. Menon a copy of her complaint." This was reported and confirmed by Norman Vanamee, who apparently met Wolf at Yale that morning. In Town & Country magazine in January 2018, Vanamee returned to the story and wrote, "Yale University has a 93-person police department, and, after the guard called for backup, three of its armed and uniformed officers appeared and stationed themselves between Wolf and the elevator bank."

== Selected works ==
=== Books ===
- The Beauty Myth: How Images of Beauty are used Against Women. New York: Perennial. 2002 [1990]. ISBN 978-0060512187.
- Fire with Fire: The New Female Power and How To Use It. New York: Fawcett Columbine. 1994. ISBN 978-0449909515.
- Promiscuities: A Secret History of Female Desire. London: Vintage. 1997. ISBN 978-0099205913.
- Misconceptions: Truth, Lies, and the Unexpected on the Journey to Motherhood. New York: Doubleday. 2001. ISBN 978-0385493024.
- The Treehouse: Eccentric Wisdom from My Father on How to Live, Love, and See. New York: Simon & Schuster. 2005. ISBN 978-0743249775.
- The End of America: Letter of Warning to a Young Patriot. White River Junction, Vermont: Chelsea Green Pub. 2007. ISBN 978-1933392790.
- The Inner Compass for Ethics & Excellence. 2007. ISBN 978-1934441282., co-authored with Daniel Goleman
- Give me Liberty: A Handbook for American Revolutionaries. New York: Simon & Schuster. 2008. ISBN 978-1416590569.
- Vagina: A New Biography. New York: Ecco. 2012. ISBN 978-0061989162.
- Outrages: Sex, Censorship and the Criminalisation of Love. Chelsea Green Pub. 2020. ISBN 978-1645020165.
- The Bodies of Others: The New Authoritarians, Covid-19 and the War Against the Human. All Seasons Press. 2022. ISBN 978-1737478560.
- Facing the Beast: Courage, Faith, and Resistance in a New Dark Age. Chelsea Green. 2023. ISBN 978-1645022367.
- The Pfizer Papers: Pfizer's Crimes Against Humanity. War Room Books. 2024. ISBN 978-1648210372.

=== Book chapters ===
- Fallon, Patricia; Katzman, Melanie A.; Wooley, Susan C., eds. (1994). "Hunger". Feminist Perspectives on Eating Disorders. New York: Guilford Press. pp. 94–114. ISBN 978-1572301825.
