= David Shipley =

American journalist

- Born: June 10, 1963 (age 63); Portland, Oregon, U.S.
- Education: Williams College (BA)
- Occupation: Journalist
- Notable credit(s): The Washington Post, The New York Times
- Spouse: Naomi Wolf (m. 1993; div. 2005)
- Children: 2

David Julian Shipley (born June 10, 1963) is an American journalist and book author. He was the executive editor of The New Republic from 1992 to 1995, worked at The New York Times from 1998 to 2010 (serving as the editorial page's editor from 2007 to 2010), was executive editor of Bloomberg View (also known as Bloomberg Opinion) from 2011 to 2022, and served as editorial page editor at The Washington Post from 2022 to 2025.

== Life and career ==
Shipley graduated with a bachelor's degree in English from Williams College. In 1986, he worked as an editorial assistant at Simon & Schuster in New York City.

In 1990, Shipley worked as an assigning editor for the Op-Ed page at The New York Times. From 1993 to 1995, he was the executive editor of The New Republic.

From 1995 to 1997, Shipley served in the Clinton administration as Special Assistant to the President and Senior Presidential Speechwriter.

After, from 1998 to 1999, Shipley worked as a deputy editor of The New York Times Magazine's Millennium Project, later becoming a senior editor for the magazine from 1999 to 2000.

In 2003, Shipley became an Op-Ed page editor for The New York Times' Opinions section. He was later promoted to the section's editorial page editor in 2007. That same year, he co-wrote, with Will Schwalbe, the book Send: The Essential Guide to Email for Office and Home (republished under the title Send: Why People Email So Badly and How To Do It Better), published by Alfred A. Knopf.

Shipley is a former executive editor of Bloomberg View, where he oversaw its editorial page and its associated columnists and op-ed contributors. He was chosen for this position in December 2010 and jointly launched Bloomberg View with James P. Rubin in May 2011.

In July 2022, Shipley became The Washington Post's editorial page editor, overseeing the newspaper's Opinions section. He succeeded Fred Hiatt, who died from cardiac arrest in December 2021.

In February 2025, Shipley parted ways with The Washington Post after its owner, Jeff Bezos, discussed an intention to prohibit, on the editorial page and opinions section, viewpoints opposing the pillars of "personal liberties and free markets". In January 2026 Shipley returned to the New York Times.

== Personal life ==
Shipley married Naomi Wolf in 1993. The couple had two children: a son and a daughter. Shipley and Wolf divorced in 2005. He is Jewish.
