= Surviving Death =

2021 television docu-series

- Promotional poster
- Genre: Documentary
- Directed by: Ricki Stern
- Country of origin: United States
- No. of seasons: 1
- No. of episodes: 6

Production
- Producers: Jonele Conceicao; Ricki Stern; Jesse Sweet; Jessica Vale

Original release
- Network: Netflix
- Release: January 6, 2021

Surviving Death is a docu-series directed by Ricki Stern about near-death experiences and beliefs in life after death, and psychic mediumship. Its first season of six episodes was released on Netflix on 6 January 2021. The series is based on the 2017 book Surviving Death by journalist and paranormal enthusiast Leslie Kean.

While some reviewers described the show as providing a balanced treatment of a difficult topic, others have been highly critical, noting that the show takes a non-critical view of the scientific value of anecdotal subjective personal reports. The show has also been criticized for presenting pseudoscientific parapsychology as science and has been accused of exploiting the plight of fearful and grieving vulnerable people.

== Episodes ==
No.	Title	Directed by	Original release date
1	"Near-Death Experiences"	Ricki Stern	January 6, 2021
2	"Mediums Part 1"	Ricki Stern	January 6, 2021
3	"Mediums Part 2"	Ricki Stern	January 6, 2021
4	"Signs from the Dead"	Ricki Stern	January 6, 2021
5	"Seeing Dead People"	Ricki Stern	January 6, 2021
6	"Reincarnation"	Ricki Stern	January 6, 2021

== Reception ==
In The Independent 'State of the Arts', column writer Micha Frazer-Carroll described the series as appealing to those who are coping with anxieties about death. She adds that its coverage of near-death experiences includes pop culture clichés and superstitions but offers persuasive personal accounts and that it incorporated dominant psychological theories like oxygen deprivation to explain some of the experience. The coverage of mediumship includes accounts of fraudulent exploitation. Frazer-Caroll wrote that skeptics may not become convinced and that the people involved often embraced hope in the afterlife with interest in these experiences to cope with the loss of a loved one. She mentioned Stern's presentation that focused on being open to people's experiences.

Culture writer and film critic Radheyan Simonpillai wrote for The Guardian that the series "has no shortage of paranormal activity. Mediums call on the dead. Seances try to manifest them. People claim to be reincarnated actors, pilots or murder victims while others describe feeling a heavenly embrace during near-death experiences." He adds that the show also welcomes skepticism. Simonpillai mentions that the show "tries to find the tricky balance between that Sherlock skepticism and Doyle's openness to spiritualism" and that "you have to be willing to accept that a visit from a persistent cardinal or flickering lights can be signs from the dead." He quotes Kean: "Everybody has to decide for themselves whether something has that meaning for them or not ... with signs, it's not really objective." He adds that unlike Kean's book, the series focuses more on testimonials of people who believed to have witnessed the afterlife.

Live Science contributor Stephanie Pappas argued that while religious faith is untestable, outside of what science does, the series attempts to portray it as something that could be proven or discredited scientifically and that "it confuses its own narrative by offering the same credulity to outright scams as it does to outstanding questions about the process of death". She adds that while patients may still sometimes have experiences when doctors don't expect them to because their heart stopped, it is not an indication that they are supernatural or don't originate from the brain; that brain-endogenous DMT could possibly also be responsible for such vivid experiences. Some experiences also result from the gradual awakening from sedation at the end of ICU medical procedures. Pappas mentions Parnia who was invited to participate in the show but who declined, reportedly "because the show made no distinction between scientific research on topics such as the recalled experience of death and the pseudoscience of ghosts and mediums." She adds that despite these problems, strong personal experiences can be meaningful to those who live them and potentially transformative. In relation to mediumship, Pappas wrote that people who hire mediums already want to believe and that the show's treatment of the topic was less plausible than that about near death experiences. She concludes that Surviving Death "tells a compelling tale of people's desire for meaning in the universe — and of their deep, unrelenting love for deceased family and friends."

Film critic and pop-culture writer Nick Schager wrote for The Daily Beast that Surviving Death's evidence "is of a pseudo-scientific, anecdotal, and/or outright fanciful sort." He criticized the show for ignoring natural explanations, cultural narratives and human tendencies for these experiences and interpretations, but suggesting instead that the afterlife is real. He added: "To the series, anyone who doesn't accept these spiritual concepts and experiences is a 'skeptic' driven by 'hubris and arrogance.' It assumes a perspective in which the veracity of its claims is the norm, and those who view them with suspicion are close-minded cynics." Shager notes that while the series projects a type of skeptical dialogue, it is staged and loaded by believers to suggest conclusions. He adds that while the show does highlight how people cling to such experiences and beliefs for comfort, the repeated suggestions are that of a universal conclusion that lost loved ones are well ("affirmation-by-numbers"). He describes the show's view of afterlife as simplistic, "one in which all ghosts communicate in the same indirect-clue fashion, and have the same unrevealing things to say ... that our paths are irreversibly set in stone, and thus that we have no free will, and that a higher power with a divine plan governs everything and everyone." He noted the use of flawed justifications to avoid evaluating the reliability of claims, like that of ectoplasm generation: that it's averse to light, so cannot be filmed. He concluded by criticizing the recipe used to conclude the series, disguising faith into psychologist statements presenting a false equivalence without resolving anything.

A review in the Explica magazine described Surviving Death as "one of the biggest nonsense of this incipient movie season", "a regrettable attempt to legitimize magical thinking", presenting a collection of pseudoscientific parapsychology as science. It points out that no proper laboratory experiment ever demonstrated evidence of the paranormal, but that advances in neurology conversely demonstrated human experiences and brains to be notoriously unreliable, adding "we can resort to reasonable explanations, without being delirious with the fantasies of Surviving Death, because of our neuropsychological knowledge." It criticized the show for presenting flawed narratives about "materialistic science" like pretending that other methods of knowledge acquisition exist that rival the scientific method, with clichés like "there are things that science cannot prove, but that does not mean they do not happen." It adds that the show promotes delusions as justifications, ignoring that the absence of evidence should imply caution and scientific skepticism instead of jumping to fantastic conclusions. It notes that the various testimonies have been selected and presented by the producers to push their own conclusions and that discredited hoaxes like Franek Kluski's "materialisations" using paraffin are claimed to be genuine. It accuses Surviving Death of "taking advantage of desperate people", as Stern's supporting narratives reiterates the conclusions and "uses the terrible grief of his interviewees to support his fallacies ... He uses vulnerable people who have lost a loved one, are broken in pain and admit to being desperate to support his irrational thesis."
