= Nuckols, Virginia =

Unincorporated community in Virginia, United States

Coordinates: 37°35′39″N 78°19′17″W

Nuckols is an unincorporated community in Buckingham County, in the U.S. state of Virginia.
