= The End of America (film) =

- Directed by: Ricki Stern; Anne Sundberg
- Written by: Naomi Wolf, Michelle Ngo, Ricki Stern, Anne Sundberg, Patricia Sunshine
- Produced by: Avram Ludwig, Michelle Ngo, Laura Dawn, Michael Mailer, John Buffalo Mailer
- Starring: Naomi Wolf
- Cinematography: Michael Barro
- Edited by: Patricia Sunshine
- Music by: Daron Murphy
- Distributed by: IndiePix Films and Snag Films
- Release date: 2008
- Running time: 73 minutes
- Country: United States
- Language: English

The End of America is a 2008 documentary film directed by Annie Sundberg and Ricki Stern, adapted from Naomi Wolf's 2007 book, The End of America: Letter of Warning to a Young Patriot. The film scrutinizes policy changes implemented during the Bush administration and argues the case that these alterations pose a threat to American democracy.

== Synopsis ==
The End of America details the ten steps a country takes when it slides toward fascism. The film takes a historical look at trends in once-functioning democracies from modern history, based on Wolf's 2007 book The End of America: Letter of Warning to a Young Patriot. The films asserts such trends are being repeated in America today, and puts the recent gradual loss of civil liberties in the U.S. in a historical context. "The average American might not be alarmed at AT&T selling our private information to the Bush administration, but when this action is seen as part of a larger series of erosions and events, a pattern emerges with unfortunate consequences that become disturbingly clear."

== Style ==
The film's style is similar to that of An Inconvenient Truth in that Wolf presents a lecture, filmed with multiple cameras, to an interactive audience. Break-away segments featuring both talking-head and "fly on the wall" interviews demonstrate the historical echoes and present-day consequences of the erosion of America's Constitution. These interviews are from a diverse collection of individuals, including intelligence community top brass, who are willing to talk on camera about the uselessness of "intelligence" gained through torture. The film also features grassroots political leaders, military generals, and victims of undermined civil liberties.

== The Ten Steps ==
Wolf outlines ten steps that "closing societies" – such as Hitler's Germany, Mussolini's Italy, and Stalin's Russia – have historically followed. These steps, Wolf claims, are being observed in America now.

The steps are:

1. Invoke a terrifying internal and external enemy.
2. Create secret prisons where torture takes place.
3. Develop a thug caste or paramilitary force not answerable to citizens.
4. Set up an internal surveillance system.
5. Harass citizens' groups.
6. Engage in arbitrary detention and release.
7. Target key individuals.
8. Control the press.
9. Treat all political dissidents as traitors.
10. Suspend the rule of law

== Distribution ==
The End of America is viewable online free of charge. It has been made available in this way through IndiePix Films and Snag Films.
