= Joan Rivers: A Piece of Work =

- Theatrical release poster
- Directed by: Ricki Stern; Anne Sundberg
- Written by: Ricki Stern
- Produced by: Ricki Stern; Anne Sundberg; Seth Keal
- Starring: Joan Rivers; Melissa Rivers; Don Rickles; Kathy Griffin
- Cinematography: Charles Miller
- Edited by: Penelope Falk
- Music by: Paul Brill
- Production company: Break Thru Films
- Distributed by: IFC Films
- Release dates: January 25, 2010 (Sundance); June 11, 2010 (United States)
- Running time: 85 minutes
- Country: United States
- Language: English
- Box office: $2.9 million

Joan Rivers: A Piece of Work is a 2010 documentary film about the life and career of comedian Joan Rivers, also featuring Melissa Rivers, Don Rickles and Kathy Griffin.

It had its world premiere at the Sundance Film Festival on January 25, 2010. It was released on June 11, 2010, by IFC Films. The film received positive reviews from critics.

== Synopsis ==
The film follows Joan Rivers for 14 months, mostly during the 76th year of her life. The film made an effort to "[peel] away the mask" and expose the "struggles, sacrifices and joy of living life as a ground breaking female performer." The New York Times reported that Stern and Sundberg "lucked out" with their timing, starting to film the year before Rivers won Donald Trump's Celebrity Apprentice in 2008.

== Cast ==
All appearing as themselves

- Joan Rivers
- Melissa Rivers
- Richard Belzer
- Brad Garrett
- Kathy Griffin
- Bill Maher
- Don Rickles
- Jeff Ross
- Garry Shandling
- Lily Tomlin

== Release ==
The film had its world premiere at the Sundance Film Festival on January 25, 2010. Shortly after, IFC Films acquired distribution rights to the film. It also screened at the Tribeca Film Festival on April 26, 2010, and the San Francisco International Film Festival at the Castro Theatre on May 6, 2010. It was released in a limited release on June 11, 2010.

=== Box office ===
In its opening weekend, the film made $164,351 while playing at 7 theaters.

=== Home media ===
On December 14, 2010, A Piece of Work was released on Region 1 DVD and Blu-ray, complete with the theatrical trailer, 10 deleted scenes, and TV spots.

== Critical reception ==
Joan Rivers: A Piece of Work received positive reviews from film critics. It holds a 92% approval rating on review aggregator website Rotten Tomatoes, based on 108 reviews, with a weighted average of 7.65/10. The site's critical consensus reads, "Penetrating Rivers' coarse image, this compelling documentary offers an honest, behind-the-scenes look at her career—and at show business in general." On Metacritic, the film holds a rating of 79 out of 100, based on 34 critics, indicating "generally favorable" reviews.

=== Awards ===
- U.S. Documentary Editing Award - Sundance Film Festival (2010)
