= Nuckolls, West Virginia =

- Unincorporated community
- Location within West Virginia and the United States Nuckolls (the United States)
- Coordinates: 38°5′33″N 81°23′28″W
- Country: United States
- State: West Virginia
- County: Kanawha
- Elevation: 778 ft (237 m)
- Time zone: UTC-5 (Eastern (EST))
  - Summer (DST): UTC-4 (EDT)
- GNIS ID: 1555246

Nuckolls is an unincorporated community and coal town in Kanawha County, West Virginia, United States.
