= Amram Musungu =

Kenyan politician (born 1978)

Amram Musungu (born 1978) was a candidate in the Kenyan 2017 presidential election.

In 1992, at age 15, he converted to the Church of Jesus Christ of Latter-day Saints, and at age 17 he served a proselyting mission in his native country. Afterward, friends and family helped him move to Utah, where he attended LDS Business College and earned bachelor's and master's degrees in accounting from Westminster College. He also studied at the University of Utah.

Musungu helped to translate the Book of Mormon into Swahili and has served as branch president of the Swahili branch in Salt Lake City, a member of the Mormon Tabernacle Choir, and a professor of Swahili at Brigham Young University. He received the Utah Women's Alliance for Building Community Award in 2010, the Refugee Youth Leadership Award in 2012, and the UACPA Outstanding Graduate Student Award in 2016.

In 2017 Musungu received a nomination for the presidency of Kenya.

== Works cited ==
Huntinghouse, John. "Amram Musungu, a Mormon Running For President of Kenya, Has Been Officially Nominated As His Party's Official Nominee for President". LDS SMILE. Retrieved 4-11-17.

Leonard, Wendy. "Utah Mormon running for president of Kenya". Deseret News. Retrieved 4/11/17.

Stack, Peggy. "Mormon and black: Amram Musungu is undeterred". The Salt Lake Tribune. Retrieved 4-11-17.

== Sources ==
- article on Musungu from newssite for Kenyan expatriates
- Kenyan Start article on Musungu
