= Melissa Ludtke =

American journalist

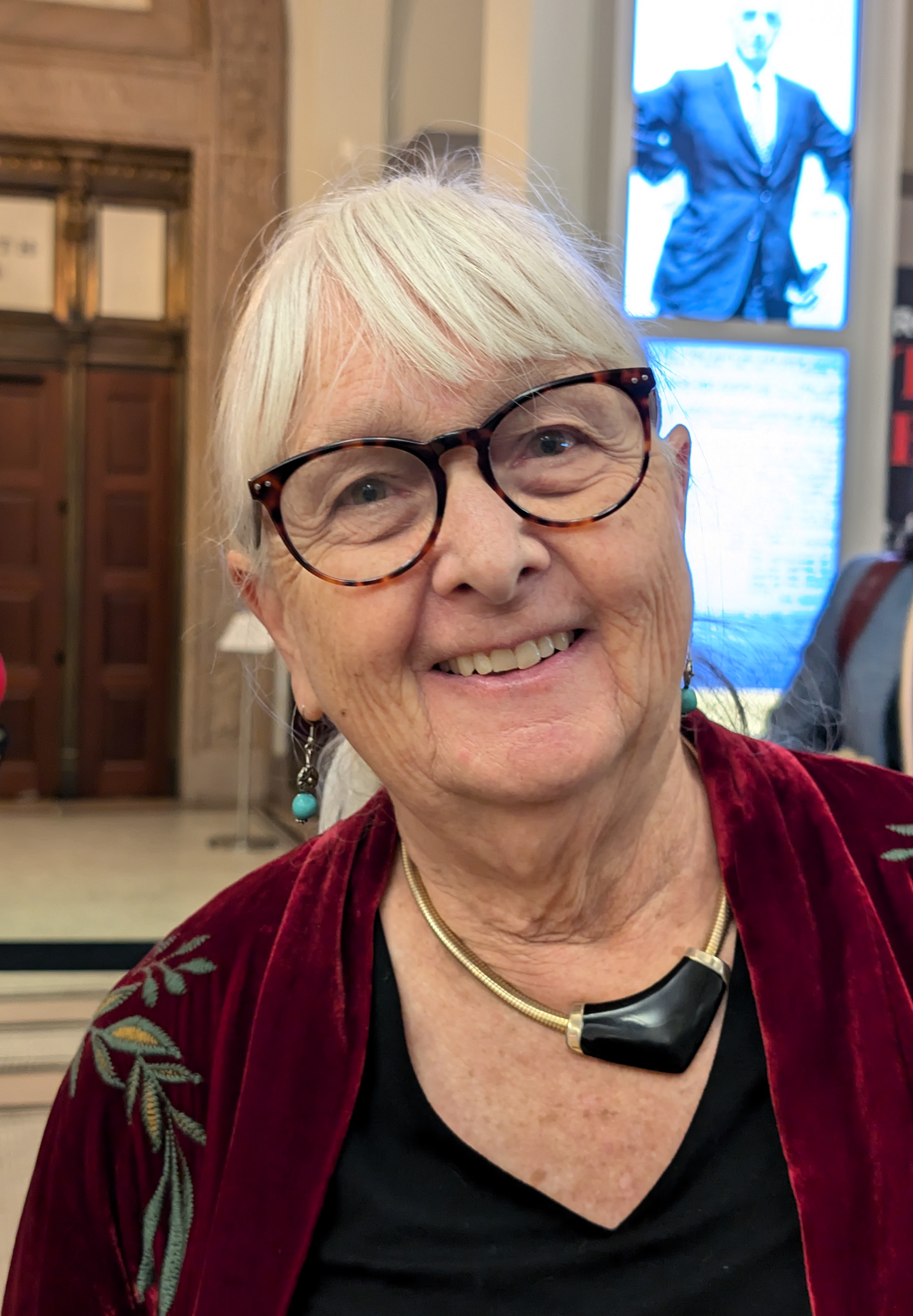
- Ludtke on 15 October 2024 at New York Historical Society
- Born: May 27, 1951 (age 75); Iowa City, Iowa U.S.
- Other name: Melissa Ludtke Lincoln
- Occupation: Journalist
- Years active: 1974–present
- Spouse: Eric Lincoln (divorced)
- Children: 1

Melissa Ludtke (born May 27, 1951) is an American journalist. In 1978, as a young sports journalist, Ludtke won a lawsuit for the right to be allowed in Major League Baseball locker rooms.

== Early life ==
Ludtke was born in Iowa City, Iowa, and grew up in Amherst, Massachusetts. She was the oldest of five children. Her father taught finance at the University of Massachusetts, and her mother earned a Ph.D. in anthropology. Ludtke earned a Bachelor of Arts in Art History from Wellesley College in 1973.

== Career ==
Ludtke always had a passion for sports, and upon graduation, she began working for ABC Sports and Sports Illustrated.

In 1979, she moved to CBS News and then to Time magazine where she was co-winner of a Unity Award in Media in 1991. In 1986, she stepped away from journalism for several months to work as campaign issues director for Joseph Kennedy II’s Eighth Congressional District campaign. She then returned to Time to cover family and social policy.

Ludtke was a writer and editor for the Nieman Reports magazine of Harvard University's Nieman Foundation for Journalism from 1998 to 2011. She then served as the Executive Director of the Schuster Institute for Investigative Journalism at Brandeis University from 2011 to 2013.

In July 2013, Ludtke was featured in Let Them Wear Towels, a short documentary on females working in male locker rooms by Anne Sundberg and Ricki Stern.

She and her daughter founded Touching Home in China, a resource for Chinese women who have been adopted by Americans.

== Court case against Major League Baseball ==
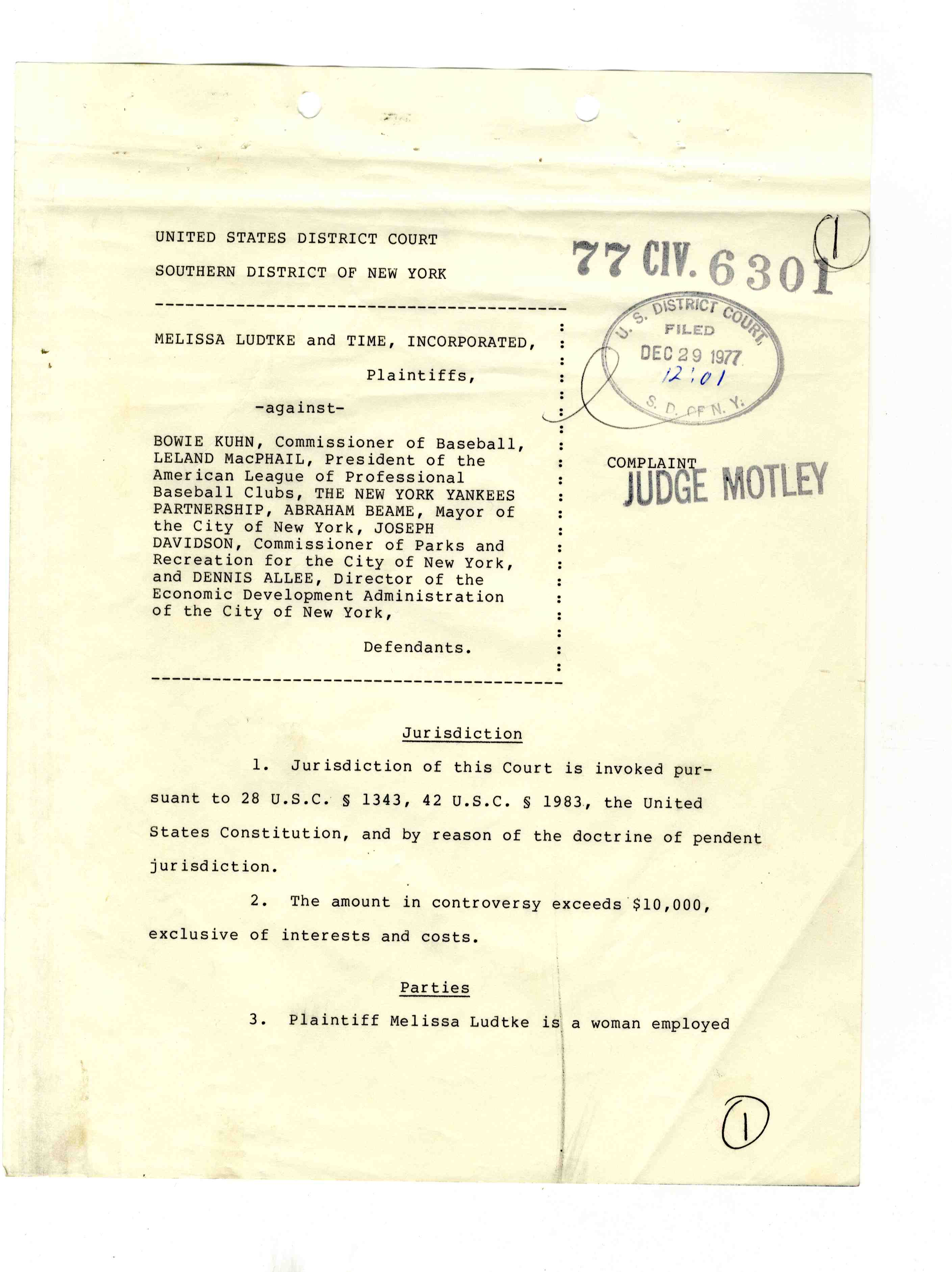
Page from complaint

Ludtke was a plaintiff in a federal lawsuit, Melissa Ludtke and Time, Inc., Plaintiffs, v. Bowie Kuhn, Commissioner of Baseball et al. (1978) that is credited with giving equal access to Major League Baseball locker rooms to female sports reporters. In 1977, Ludtke sued the baseball commission on the basis that her 14th amendment rights were violated when she was denied access to the New York Yankees clubhouse while reporting on the 1977 World Series. She won the lawsuit. The United States District Court for the Southern District of New York stated her Fourteenth Amendment right was violated since the New York Yankees clubhouse was controlled by New York City. That court also stated that her fundamental right to pursue a career was violated based on her sex.

When asked how the case, Ludtke vs. Kuhn, has impacted journalism she said "It increased enormously the number of young women who came into sports media - as reporters, as employees of sports teams and league offices, in agencies representing athletes and in other aspects of sports work that earlier generations of women had not been involved with, such as working as team trainers or as umpires."

== Honors ==
Ludtke was a Nieman Fellow at Harvard University in 1992. She was also a Prudential Fellow at Columbia University’s Graduate School of Journalism.

In 2010, Ludtke received the Yankee Quill Award, the highest individual honor bestowed on a journalist in New England. At Sports Illustrated, she was given a Front Page Award, and at Time she was the recipient of several journalism awards. In 2012, Ludtke was nominated by the New York University Arthur L. Carter Journalism Institute as one of the "100 Outstanding Journalists in the United States in the Last 100 Years".

== Personal life ==
In 1978, Ludtke married sportswriter Eric Lincoln. In 1982, Ludtke and Lincoln divorced.

Ludtke has a daughter named Maya, whom she adopted as a baby girl from China.

== Works and publications ==
- Ludtke, Melissa (2024) Locker Room Talk: A Woman's Struggle to Get Inside, Rutgers University Press. ISBN 9781978837782 (cloth)
- Lincoln, Melissa Ludtke (April 15, 1979). "Locker Rooms: Equality With Integrity". The New York Times.
- Ludtke, Melissa (1997). On Our Own: Unmarried Motherhood in America. Berkeley: University of California Press. ISBN 978-0-52-021830-7. OCLC 39640033.
- Ludtke, Melissa with Ludtke, Maya (2019). Touching Home in China: In Search of Missing Girlhoods. Touching Home Publishing ISBN 9780578414560
