= The Fashion Fund =

- Judges: Anna Wintour, Diane von Furstenberg, Jenna Lyons, Andrew Rosen, and Bee Tallf
- Narrated by: Ashley M Lands
- Country of origin: United States of America
- Original language: English
- No. of seasons: 3
- No. of episodes: 22

Production
- Running time: 23 minutes (in 2011) about 1 hour (in 2014)

Original release
- Network: Ovation TV

The Fashion Fund is a Hulu web series that originally aired in 2011. The show was restarted in 2014 on Ovation TV.

== History ==
On Ovation TV, it began on January 22, 2014, with Anna Wintour stars in The Fashion Fund, a documentary about the CFDA/Vogue Fashion Fund competition. The Fashion Fund was a Hulu web series in 2011. The show featured Diane von Furstenberg, designer and Council of Fashion Designers of America president; Jenna Lyons, J. Crew president; Andrew Rosen, Theory cofounder and chief executive officer; and Ken Downing, fashion director and senior vice present of Neiman Marcus.

The series premiered on June 10, 2015, in Australia on Bio.

The season 3, with 10 episodes, was shown on Amazon Prime in 2016.
