= Janis Nuckolls =

American anthropological linguist

Academic background
- Education: University of Wisconsin (BA); University of Chicago (AM, PhD)

Janis Nuckolls is an American anthropological linguist and professor of linguistics and English language at Brigham Young University in Provo, Utah. She has spent many years doing field research, with a primary focus on the Amazonian Quichua (Kichwa) people in Ecuador and their endangered language.

Nuckolls earned her BA from the University of Wisconsin and her AM and PhD from the University of Chicago. After first visiting the Amazon in graduate school, Nuckolls has been returning for field research for more than thirty years.

== Research ==
Quechua, considered an endangered language, is spoken by between 10,000 and 40,000 people. Nuckolls has published extensively on the sound-symbolic grammar, performance, and cognition in Pastaza Quechua. Her interest includes studying the functions of ideophones, which are words that offer a vivid sensory impression through sound, movement, shape, or action. Nuckolls described it "as painting a word picture–even though they are words, they function as images which communicate not only with sounds but with gestures as well". She has published, among other places, in the Journal of Linguistic Anthropology, Language in Society, Semiotica, the Annual Review of Anthropology, Latin American Indian Literatures, the Journal of Latin American Lore, Anthropological Linguistics, American Anthropologist, and Philosophical Psychology.

Believing ideophones to be best recorded in video format, to capture their performative multi-modal nature, she set up the Quechua Real Words 'audio-visual dictionary' of Amazonian Quichua (formerly also written as Quechua, but now written as Quichua and Kichwa in Ecuador) ideophones, largely from Pastaza Quichua: https://quechuarealwords.byu.edu/

As Professor Nuckolls herself put it on the website: "Quechua Real Words is a site dedicated to an appreciation and study of real words that, by their nature, are difficult to define within a traditional dictionary format. Such words, called ‘ideophones,’ ‘mimetics,' ‘expressives,’ and ‘onomatopoeias’ by linguists, present many problems for analysis because of their melodic and gestural dimensions. They are not designed to be abstracted onto a two-dimensional page and are therefore presented here with audiovisual clips of their use."

== Personal life ==
She has one son and two daughters. She has been married to Steve Zuckerman since April 2024. She is a member of the Church of Jesus Christ of Latter-day Saints.

== Bibliography ==
- Sounds Like Life: Sound-Symbolic Grammar, Performance, and Cognition in Pastaza Quechua (Oxford University Press, 1996)
- Lessons from a Quechua Strongwoman: Ideophony, Dialogue, and Perspective (University of Arizona Press, 2010, ISBN 978-0816528585)
