= Robert Friedman (producer) =

American film producer

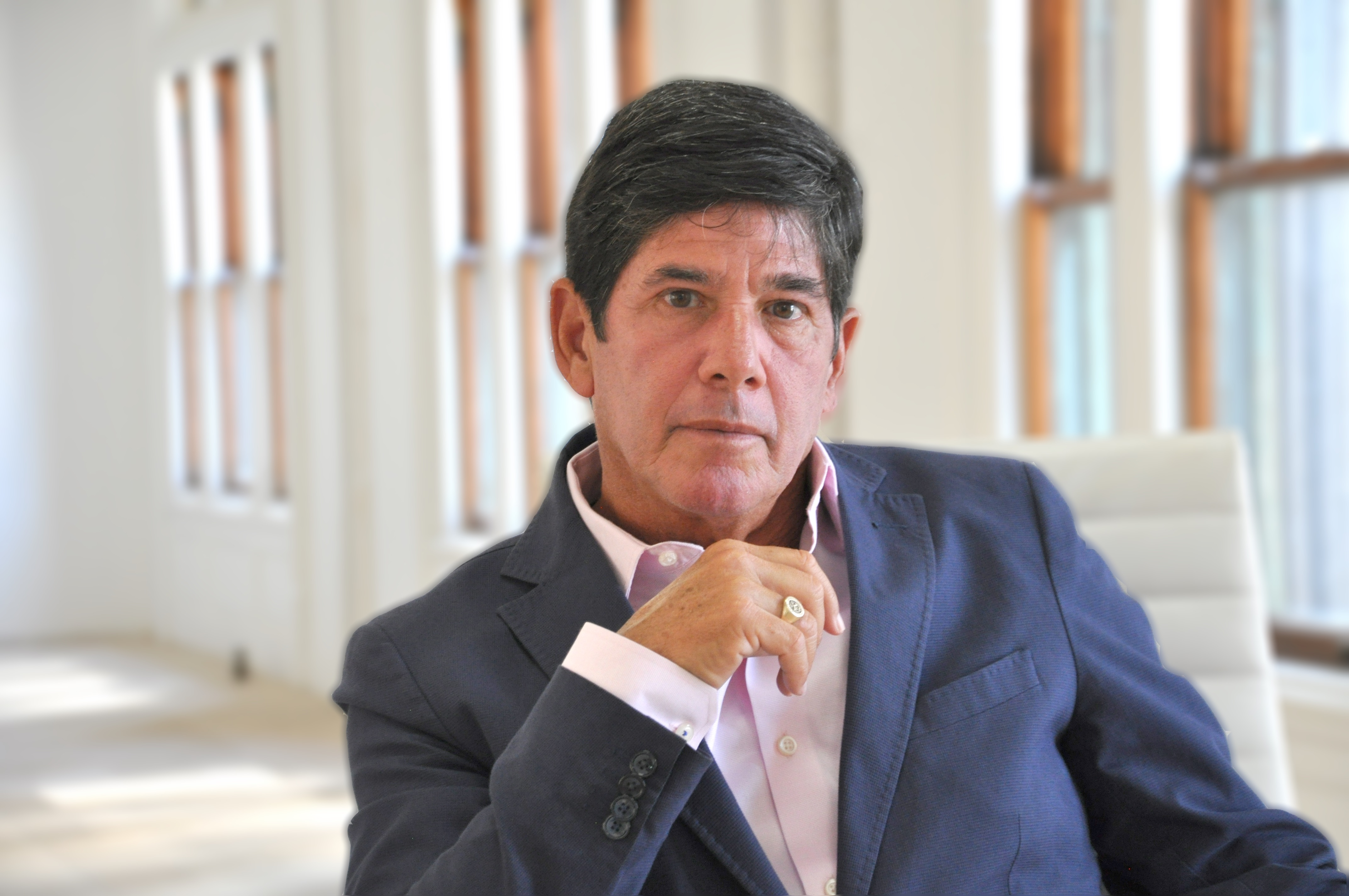
- Born: Robert Friedman; 1956 (age 69–70)
- Occupation: CEO
- Known for: Bungalow Media + Entertainment

Robert Friedman (born 1956) is an American businessman in the entertainment industry. He is the CEO of Bungalow Media + Entertainment, a private equity-backed entertainment and media company he founded in 2013. It develops, produces and distributes content across all platforms. Beginning his career as an account manager at Grey Advertising he then held roles at AOL Time Warner, New Line Cinema, Classic Media, and RadicalMedia. He has produced films including Paradise Lost 3: Purgatory, Mortal Kombat: Conquest, and Under African Skies, for which he shared a Christopher Award.

== Early life ==
Friedman attended Vassar College, from which he received an AB in psychology in 1978. He subsequently earned an MBA degree from Columbia's Graduate School of Business in 1980. He is a Trustee Emeritus of Vassar College and sits on the Board of Overseers of Columbia Business School. He was the speaker at the latter's 2009 commencement.

== Career ==
Friedman began his career in advertising as an Account Manager on P&G, at Grey Advertising. He was part of MTV Network's development team, working from 1981-1989 on MTV, VH1, Nickelodeon, and on The Movie Channel. He was in charge of Consumer and Trade Marketing for MTV Networks, and Promotion and Licensing for MTV and VH1, overseeing marketing of its secondary businesses, such as Global Licensing and Home Entertainment.

=== AOL Time Warner and New Line Cinema ===
Friedman held a variety of positions at AOL Time Warner during 1991-2003. He held two roles at New Line Cinema for ten years, as Co-Chairman of Worldwide Theatrical Marketing, Licensing and Merchandising and as President of New Line Television, which he launched in 1991. He also served as CMO for Time Warner and President of AOL – Interactive Marketing, TV, and Ad Sales. At New Line Cinema, Friedman oversaw marketing campaigns for all New Line Cinema's feature films. As President of New Line TV, he handled development, production, acquisition and the global distribution of products to network, cable, and pay-per-view markets. Friedman managed licensing and merchandising activity, as well as new media for New Line's projects.

=== Harvey and Golden Books Entertainment ===
Friedman was President and a Managing Partner of Classic Media: Harvey & Golden Books Entertainment during 2003-2006, the family entertainment company owned by DreamWorks Animation as of 2012, and Comcast as of 2016.

=== @radical.media ===
Robert Friedman was President of Entertainment and Media at @radical.media-FremantleMedia for seven years, from 2006-2013. @radical.media, now RadicalMedia, is a media and entertainment company. Friedman executive produced films for the company, including Paul Simon's documentary film Under African Skies, which won the Christopher Award in 2013, and When We Were Beautiful, which premiered at the Tribeca Film Festival. TV credits include Grey Goose's Iconoclasts and Nike's Battlegrounds campaigns; the pilot episode of the series Mad Men; Bravo's Ironic Iconic America; Britney: For the Record; and Oprah's Master Class on OWN, among others. @radical.media developed "driverTV", an HD video-on-demand channel, and THNKR, a YouTube channel. Under Friedman @radical.media sold a majority stake of the company to Fremantle in 2012.

== Associations ==
Currently, Friedman serves on the boards of AccuWeather, Mount Sinai Health System, Columbia Graduate School of Business, NATPE, and The International Academy of Television Arts and Sciences. He served on the board of Morgans Hotel Group for almost a decade where he was a recipient of the hospitality board honor of the year. He is a Trustee Emeritus of Vassar College.
