= The End of America: Letter of Warning to a Young Patriot =

2007 book by Naomi Wolf

- Author: Naomi Wolf
- Language: English
- Publication date: September 2007
- Media type: Print
- Pages: 192
- ISBN: 978-1-933392-79-0

The End of America: Letter of Warning to a Young Patriot is a 2007 non-fiction book by Naomi Wolf, published by Chelsea Green Publishing of White River Junction, Vermont. Wolf argues that events of the early 2000s paralleled steps taken in the early years of the twentieth century's worst dictatorships and called Americans to take action to restore their constitutional values before they suffer the same fate. Wolf describes the ten steps she sees as the process of transition from open societies into closed regimes.

== The ten steps ==
Naomi Wolf outlines ten steps that "closing societies" – such as Hitler's Germany, Mussolini's Italy, and Stalin's Russia – have historically followed. These steps, Wolf claimed, are being observed in America now.

The steps are:

1. Invoke a terrifying internal and external enemy.
2. Create secret prisons where torture takes place.
3. Develop a thug caste or paramilitary force not answerable to citizens.
4. Set up an internal surveillance system.
5. Infiltrate and harass citizens' groups.
6. Engage in arbitrary detention and release.
7. Target key individuals.
8. Control the press.
9. Cast criticism as espionage and dissent as treason.
10. Subvert the rule of law.

== Documentary ==
IndiePix Films produced a documentary of the same name based on the book. The film was released on DVD and online in October 2008.

== See also ==
- Gulag
- Habeas corpus
- Political dissent
