= Mark Nuckols =

American legal scholar

Mark Nuckols is a writer and regular commentator on Russian television. He appears on various political talk shows. He also writes for various publications, including The New York Post, The San Francisco Chronicle, The Atlantic, The Christian Science Monitor and others. He has taught at the Lomonosov Moscow State University Business School and at the Russian Academy of National Economy and Public Administration. He has a JD from Georgetown Law and an MBA from Tuck School of Business at Dartmouth. He grew up in rural Virginia.
