= Darryl Hunt =

African-American man wrongfully convicted of murder

Darryl Hunt (February 24, 1965 – March 13, 2016) was an African-American man from Winston-Salem, North Carolina, who, in 1984, was wrongfully convicted and sentenced to life imprisonment for the rape and the murder of Deborah Sykes, a young white newspaper copy editor. After being convicted in that case, Hunt was tried in 1987 for the 1983 murder of Arthur Wilson, a 57-year-old black man of Winston-Salem. Both convictions were overturned on appeal in 1989. Hunt was tried again in the Wilson case in 1990; he was acquitted by an all-white jury. He was tried again on the Sykes charges in 1991; he was convicted.

In 1994, the defense gained DNA testing of physical evidence in the Sykes case; this test was not available at the time of Hunt's trial in 1984. It showed that he could not have committed the rape, but a Forsyth County judge ruled that the DNA would not have been sufficient evidence to gain an acquittal, as he could still have been involved in the murder. Hunt was held in prison until 2004, when he was fully exonerated of the murder and released after serving 19 1/2 years. His exoneration followed the confession by Willard E. Brown to the crimes. In 2003 a review of the state database found that Brown's DNA matched that in the Sykes case, and in 2004 Hunt was formally exonerated.

Becoming a modern cause célèbre, Hunt's case was said to have "helped define race relations in Winston-Salem for 20 years." It resulted in an internal review and the North Carolina State Bureau of Investigation making its own inquiry in 1986. Incumbent District Attorney Donald K. Tisdale lost his bid for re-election in the Democratic primary that same year. The Winston-Salem Journal published articles on the case in a 2003 series as a result of its six-month investigation into how the police and prosecution had investigated and shaped the discussion of the murder; they tried to reconcile the new DNA evidence with other facts to keep Hunt in jail. The newspaper published an "Epilogue" with the series in 2007 after Hunt was exonerated and freed in 2004.

"In 2006 the chief justice of the N.C. Supreme Court appointed a group of prosecutors, police, defense attorneys and crime victims to the N.C. Actual Innocence Commission to look at what leads to wrongful convictions and to propose reforms." In particular, the commission recommended changes to the procedure of gaining eyewitness testimony, resulting in changes to state law. That year the state also established the North Carolina Innocence Inquiry Commission, to review cases post-conviction in which defendants and their attorneys believe they were wrongfully convicted.

While in prison, Darryl Hunt became a Muslim and worked as a volunteer with the national Innocence Project. After being released, he was given settlements by the city and state. He founded The Darryl Hunt Project for Freedom and Justice, devoted to "educating the public about flaws in the criminal justice system, advocating for those wrongfully incarcerated as a result of those flaws, and providing resources and support for those trying to rebuild their lives." He spoke widely on wrongful convictions and worked for reforms to criminal laws of North Carolina.

Darryl Hunt died in 2016 in Winston-Salem from a self-inflicted gunshot wound. Friends had been worried about his mental health and possible depression.

== Background ==
Hunt was born in Winston-Salem, North Carolina in 1965. He had an older brother Willie and a younger sister; the children were mostly raised by their maternal grandparents, William Stroud and his wife. Stroud was a foreman for the city's street department. For years the children were told their mother Jean, who visited, was their aunt. She was killed when Hunt was nine and he said that as a teenager, he was haunted by her death. The children attended local schools for a time; Hunt dropped out of high school. He went to Monterey, California with a cousin but returned to his hometown at age 18.

His grandfather had bequeathed him some money that Hunt used to get an apartment with a girlfriend and her young daughter. He worked in construction but within a year, he was no longer working, had split with the girlfriend and lost the apartment. He started hanging out or running with Sammy Mitchell, an older friend whom he had known for years.

== History of the Wilson case ==
In 1983, Arthur Wilson, a 57-year-old African-American man, was beaten and killed about 2 am outside a juke joint in Winston-Salem, North Carolina. Juke joints or apartments were common in poor, black and white neighborhoods, serving as a ready place for people to drink at most times of day or night. The police pursued some leads but did not arrest any suspects. They reopened the Wilson case in 1986 after receiving new information.

== History of the Sykes case ==
In August 1984, Deborah Sykes, a young, white, married copy editor, was raped and murdered by stabbing in the early morning about 6 am on her way to work at The Sentinel newspaper in Winston-Salem. She had recently started working there, having returned to her home state in July from the Chattanooga News-Free Press in Tennessee. Experts describe the crime as "an unusually vicious rape and murder", in which she was also sodomized and stabbed 16 times.

A witness placed Sammy Mitchell and Darryl Hunt, two young African-American men, near the scene of the crime, but was not positive about the identification. Experts have criticized the way the line-up was conducted in which Hunt was identified, noting that the police officer who conducted the line-up knew Hunt was a suspect and could have influenced the witness. Secondly, in one lineup, Hunt's photo had a different background than those of other men. Police talked to Margaret Crawford, Hunt's underage girlfriend who was working as a prostitute, who changed her account several times.

No physical evidence linked either man to the crime. But on September 14, the police charged Hunt with first-degree murder. The next day his arrest photo was published in the newspaper, associating him with the vicious murder.

"Hunt had no record of violent crime or sexual offense at the time he became a suspect." Former FBI agent Greg McCrary, "who specializes in developing psychological profiles of sex offenders," said that usually such a violent crime as Sykes was committed by someone with a history of violence against women.

In 1985 Hunt was convicted of the rape and first-degree murder of Sykes; the jury had eleven whites and one black man. (The three alternates were also white; the county's population was 25% black.) According to a later discussion by the jury foreman, members had a difficult time with the case, initially voting 7-5 in favor of guilt. Ultimately they did vote unanimously that he was guilty of first-degree murder. In the separate vote for sentencing, Hunt was spared the death penalty because none of the jurors voted for the capital sentence. He was sentenced to life imprisonment.

He was indicted again in 1990 for the crimes against Sykes, under a new county district attorney. Mitchell was also indicted that year in Sykes' death but was never brought to trial. Warren Sparrow had defeated incumbent Donald K. Tisdale in the 1986 Democratic primary for District Attorney, largely due to a backlash by the black community over the latter's handling of Hunt's trial. Hunt's defense attorney gained a change in venue for his client's trial, as the case had been widely publicized in the Winston-Salem and Forsyth County areas. "Faced with a retrial in rural Catawba County, prosecutors offered a plea bargain to Hunt that would have set him free. Rather that admit guilt, Hunt turned down the deal."

The same eyewitnesses testified, as did two jailhouse informants. The trial took four weeks. The defense tried to show that the eyewitnesses were unreliable. Hunt was tried in 1990 by an all-white jury from the rural county; it convicted him of Syke's rape and murder. He was sentenced to life and returned to prison.

By the late 1980s, new forms of forensic testing had become available, including DNA analysis. Hunt sought to have his DNA tested and compared to material collected in the Sykes crime. In 1994, Hunt's DNA was tested, as was that from semen and other case evidence. Hunt did not have a match to the DNA in the semen collected from Sykes' body, showing that he could not have committed the rape. In addition, the prosecution tested the DNA of Mitchell, Gray (each of whom had been implicated to some extent), and Sykes' husband. The DNA in the semen matched none of them. But the prosecution still contended that Hunt was involved in the murder by a now unknown assailant. Neither Forsyth County judge Melzer Morgan nor the appellate court granted Hunt a new trial based on this evidence.

Hunt's supporters believed strongly that because the assault was at the heart of the case, the related murder charges were in question. But the prosecution suggested that Hunt could have been involved in the murder, even if not the rape, and that a third man might have been involved with him and another. "The state changed its theory of the crime to fit the new DNA evidence rather than reinvestigate the case." Hunt's attorney filed a series of appeals.

In December 2003, Hunt's defense prevailed in getting the DNA collected from the rape-murder to be run for the first time against the state database; a match was found with the DNA of Willard E. Brown, also a resident of Winston-Salem. He had been a suspect in a 1985 rape and slashing of a young white woman that had circumstances similar to that of Sykes. He was never prosecuted. According to Regina Lane, who had gone to the police in 1985 about the attack on her, especially because of similarities to the Sykes case, officers discouraged her from pressing charges. "The Sykes Administrative Review Committee concluded that Winston-Salem police investigators made numerous mistakes in not connecting Lane's rape with Sykes' murder." Based on this review and that by the State Bureau of Investigation, the city put into place new procedures to prevent police officers from having such tunnel vision about cases.

When questioned by police after the DNA match to the Sykes case, Brown confessed to the 1984 rape and stabbing death of Sykes. Brown's confession ultimately resulted in the full exoneration and release of Darryl Hunt in 2004, who by then had served more than 19 years of a life sentence for crimes which he denied committing.

On February 6, 2004, Superior Court Judge Anderson Cromer held a release hearing on Hunt. Sykes' mother Evelyn Jefferson took the stand and criticized the judge for proposing to release a man she still believed was guilty. When given a chance to speak, Hunt offered her and the Sykes family his condolences for their loss, and forgave everyone for the years he spent in prison. Judge Cromer vacated Hunt’s murder conviction in the case. The case against Hunt was dismissed with prejudice, meaning that Hunt could not be tried again in the murder.

== Post-prison: Working for reform ==
"Starting that day, Hunt devoted his life to reforming a criminal justice system that had stripped him of nearly two decades of his life, becoming a globally known advocate for the wrongfully convicted with a similar kind of grace he showed Jefferson." He founded The Darryl Hunt Project for Freedom and Justice, seeking to educate the public about criminal justice cases, to gain counsel for the wrongfully convicted, and to help released prisoners rebuild their lives after exoneration and release.

A community activist, Hunt became an award-winning speaker, and acted frequently as a mentor. He spoke at hundreds of conferences, to students at schools, audiences at film festivals, and congregations of religious groups in an effort to spread his message of reform in the criminal justice system. He urged compassion and help to those trying to rebuild lives after serving in prison. He played a pivotal role in North Carolina's statewide effort to pass a Death Penalty Moratorium Bill. Due to various appeals and challenges, including over lethal injection as a method of execution, for nearly ten years the state did not execute any prisoners. Earlier it had the fifth-highest execution rate in the nation.

== Aftermath ==
Citizens of Winston-Salem collaborated on creating the Deborah Sykes Administrative Review Committee to investigate the city's handling of this case. "Over the course of its inquiry from 2005-2007, a citizens committee revealed mistakes made by law-enforcement officers in the handling of the Sykes case and three other rape cases that occurred in the same time frame." They released a 103-page report with a 9000-page appendix in February 2007. The city issued a formal apology to Darryl Hunt and made a settlement for his wrongful conviction and years in jail.

Stephen Dear, executive director of People of Faith Against the Death Penalty, credited Hunt with contributing to the passage of the legislature of a law establishing the North Carolina Innocence Inquiry Commission, to investigate cases of wrongful convictions. It was the first such independent commission in the United States. From 2007 through March 2017, it has exonerated ten inmates. Hunt also testified before a US Senate Judiciary Committee hearing on the death penalty appeals process.

Hunt's and similar cases contributed to the legislature's passage of the North Carolina Racial Justice Act of 2009, which "allowed death-row inmates to have their sentences reduced to life in prison if they could prove racial bias influenced the outcome of their cases." After the act was passed, most of the 153 persons on death row filed appeals. From 2009 to June 2013, four persons received amended sentences to life imprisonment. State lawmakers repealed the act in 2013, but many appeal cases are pending. In 2016, both candidates for North Carolina State Attorney General campaigned on the basis of retaining the death penalty in the state.

== Settlement ==
After Hunt was released, his attorneys began negotiation with the city of Winston-Salem over his wrongful conviction and damages. This was during the period when the Sykes Committee was investigating how the city had responded to his case. After the committee made its report, on February 19, 2007, Winston-Salem settled with Hunt, awarding him $1,650,000. He used much of the money to support his effort to help others. In 2004 Hunt had received a settlement of $358,545 under a state law that provides $20,000 for every year of wrongful imprisonment.

== Death ==
Hunt died on March 13, 2016. Friends had been worried that he was not taking good care of himself and suffering from depression. Hunt had told friends he was terminally ill with cancer; however, his autopsy report from the medical examiner found no evidence of this, nor did his medical records mention any diagnosis of cancer. This may have been to cover up his weight loss from suspected drug use. Police later announced that he had fatally shot himself.

== Representation in other media ==
- The independent documentary film titled The Trials of Darryl Hunt (2005), was named a Sundance Film Festival selection that year. It premiered in early 2006 in Winston-Salem, where it was shown at the Stevens Center to an audience of 1,300. The film explores the "deeply personal story of a wrongfully convicted man." It was directed and produced by Ricki Stern and Annie Sundberg. First shown on HBO, in 2013 it was available via streaming on Netflix.
- Leigh Somerville McMillan, a journalist for the Winston-Salem Journal, wrote the book Long Time Coming (2007) about this case. McMillan includes comments from Jo Anne North Goetz, Hunt's sixth-grade teacher, who had steadfast belief in his innocence.
- Stephen B. Boyd wrote the book Making Justice Our Business: The Wrongful Conviction of Darryl Hunt and the Work of Faith (2011) (978-1-60899-966-8). It chronicles Hunt’s story: his conviction for the Sykes murder, time in prison, exoneration, and the community that never lost faith in his innocence. It argues for persons of faith to seek justice for others in their community.
- "On Her Own," an episode of the crime documentary series Cold Blood, explored the Sykes murder and Hunt case. It included "interviews, file footage, forensic evidence and dramatic re-enactments." It aired on Investigation Discovery channel in April 2012.
- Phoebe Zerwick, investigative journalist and professor at Wake Forest University, wrote: "Beyond Innocence: The Life Sentence of Darryl Hunt" (2022) (978-0802159373) which tells the powerful story of Darryl Hunt’s wrongful incarceration, the struggles to prove his innocence, and the challenges he faced after being released and proved innocent.

== See also ==
- List of wrongful convictions in the United States
- Innocence Project
- List of racism-related topics
- Racism in the United States
- Southern United States
- Scottsboro Boys
- Jena 6
- Trenton Six
- Maternal Insult
- Central Park Five
