= Denazification =

Allied initiative to remove Nazism

- Entnazifizierung
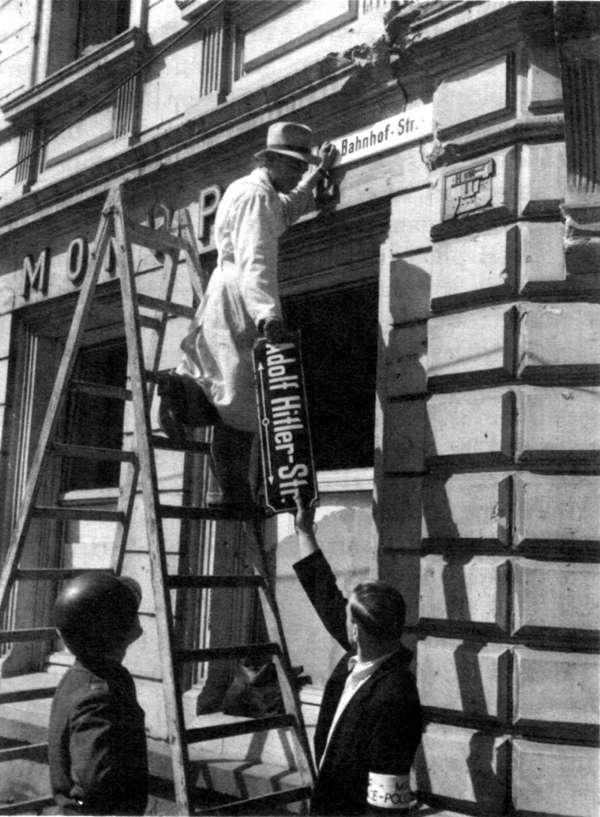
- Workers removing the signage from a former "Adolf Hitler-Straße" (today "Bahnhofstraße") in Trier, May 12, 1945
- Type of project: Anti-fascism; Anti-Nazism
- Location: Allied-occupied Germany (until 1949); Allied-occupied Austria; Saar Protectorate (from 1947); West Germany (from 1949); East Germany (from 1949)
- Established: 1945
- Disestablished: 1951

Denazification (German: Entnazifizierung) was an Allied initiative to rid German and Austrian society, culture, press, economy, judiciary, and politics of the Nazi ideology following the Second World War. It was carried out by removing those who had been Nazi Party or SS members from positions of power and influence, disbanding or rendering impotent the organizations associated with Nazism, and trying prominent Nazis for war crimes in the Nuremberg trials of 1946. The program of denazification was launched after the end of the war and was solidified by the Potsdam Agreement in August 1945. The term, in the hyphenated form de-nazification, was first used in 1943 by the Pentagon, intended to be applied in a narrow sense with reference to the post-war German legal system. However, according to historian Frederick Taylor, it later was used with a broader meaning.

Very soon after the program started, due to the emergence of the Cold War, the western powers and the United States in particular began to lose interest in the program, somewhat mirroring the Reverse Course in American-occupied Japan. Denazification was carried out in an increasingly lenient and lukewarm way until being officially abolished in 1951. The American government soon came to view the program as ineffective and counterproductive. Additionally, the program was highly unpopular in West Germany, where many Nazis maintained positions of power. Denazification was opposed by the new West German government of Konrad Adenauer, who declared that ending the process was necessary for West German rearmament.

In contrast, in the Soviet occupation zone and later East Germany, denazification was considered a critical element of the transformation into a socialist society and denazification policies were implemented more thoroughly. However, denazification was often applied unevenly and to further the political objectives of the emerging East German Socialist Unity Party.

Not all former Nazis faced judgment. Special connections with the occupiers or performing special tasks for the occupation governments could protect Nazi members from prosecution, enabling them to continue working and in some cases reach prominence. One of the most notable cases involved Wernher von Braun, who was among other German scientists recruited by the United States through Operation Paperclip and later occupied key positions in the American space program.

== Etymology ==
The term, in the hyphenated form de-nazification, was first used in 1943 by the Pentagon, intended to be applied in a narrow sense with reference to the post-war German legal system. However, it later took on a broader meaning, according to historian Frederick Taylor.

== Overview ==
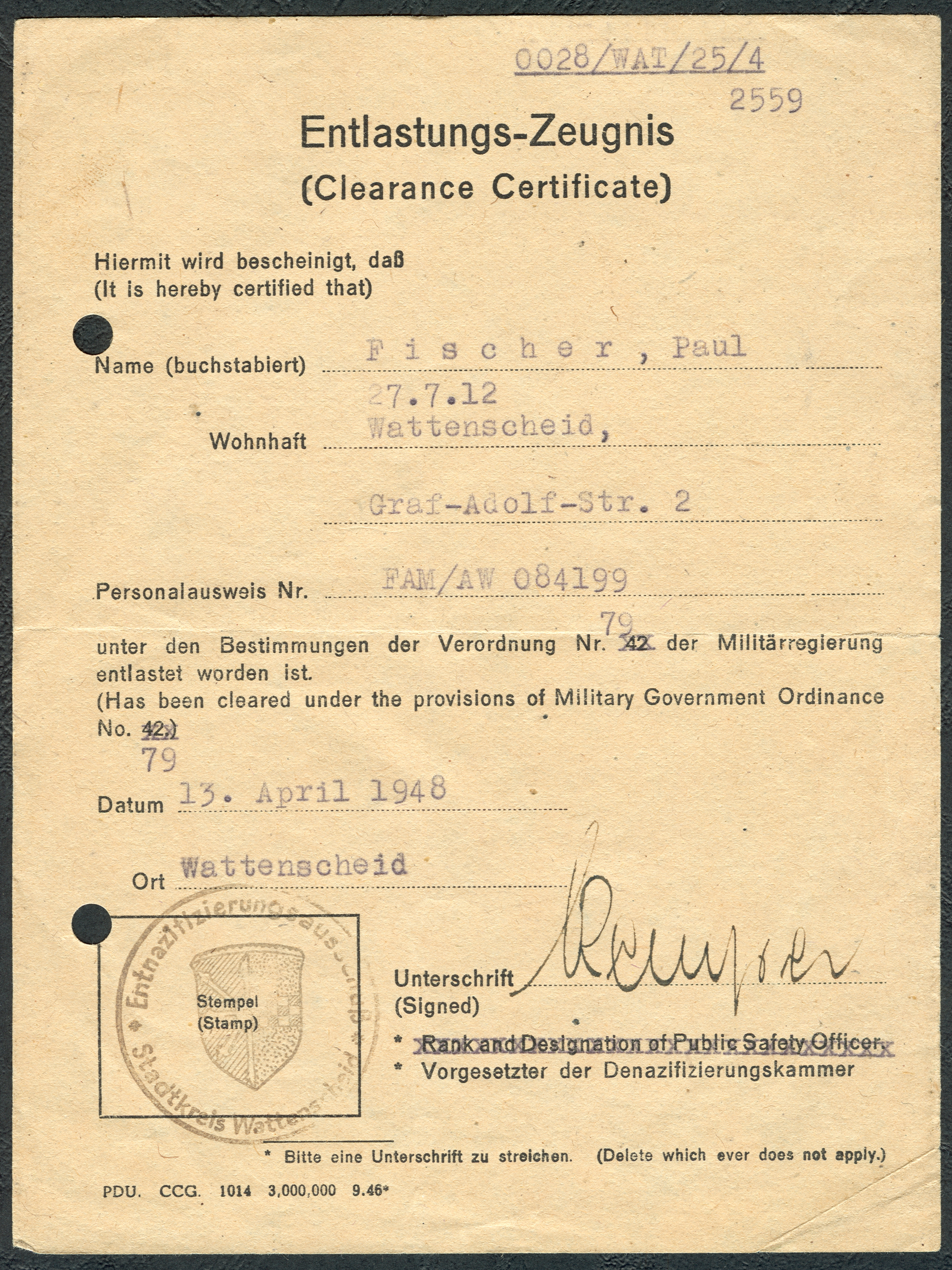
A 1948 denazification clearance certificate from Wattenscheid in the British Zone

About 8 million Germans, or 10% of the population, had been members of the Nazi Party. Nazi-related organizations also had huge memberships, such as the German Labor Front (25 million), the National Socialist People's Welfare organization (17 million), the League of German Women, and others. It was through the Party and these organizations that the Nazi state was run, involving as many as 45 million Germans in total. In addition, Nazism found significant support among industrialists, who produced weapons or used slave labor, and large landowners, especially the Junkers in Prussia. Denazification after the surrender of Germany was thus an enormous undertaking, fraught with many difficulties.

The first difficulty was the enormous number of Germans who might have to be first investigated, then penalized if found to have supported the Nazi state to an unacceptable degree. In the early months of denazification there was a great desire to be utterly thorough, to investigate every suspect and hold every supporter of Nazism accountable; however, it was decided that the numbers simply made this goal impractical. The Morgenthau Plan had recommended that the Allies create a post-war Germany with all its industrial capacity destroyed, reduced to a level of subsistence farming; however, that plan was soon abandoned as unrealistic and, because of its excessive punitive measures, liable to give rise to German anger and aggression. As time went on, another consideration that moderated the denazification effort in the West was the concern to keep enough good will of the German population to prevent the growth of communism.

The denazification process was often completely disregarded by both the Soviets and the Western powers for German rocket scientists and other technical experts, who were taken out of Germany to work on projects in the victors' own countries or simply seized in order to prevent the other side from taking them. The US took 785 scientists and engineers from Germany to the United States, some of whom formed the backbone of the US space program (see Operation Paperclip).

In the case of the top-ranking Nazis, such as Göring, Hess, Ribbentrop, Streicher, and Speer, the initial proposal by the British was simply to arrest them and shoot them, but that course of action was replaced by putting them on trial for war crimes at the Nuremberg Trials in order to publicize their crimes while demonstrating, especially to the German people, that the trials and the sentences were just. However, the legal foundations of the trials were questioned, and many Germans were not convinced that the trials were anything more than "victors' justice".

Many refugees from Nazism were Germans and Austrians, and some had fought for Britain in the Second World War. Some were transferred into the Intelligence Corps and sent back to Germany and Austria in British uniform. However, German-speakers were small in number in the British zone, which was hampered by the language deficit. Due to its large German-American population, the US authorities were able to bring a larger number of German-speakers to the task of working in the Allied Military Government, although many were poorly trained. They were assigned to all aspects of military administration, the interrogation of prisoners of war, collecting evidence for the War Crimes Investigation Unit, and the search for war criminals.

== Application ==
=== American zone ===
==== General topics ====
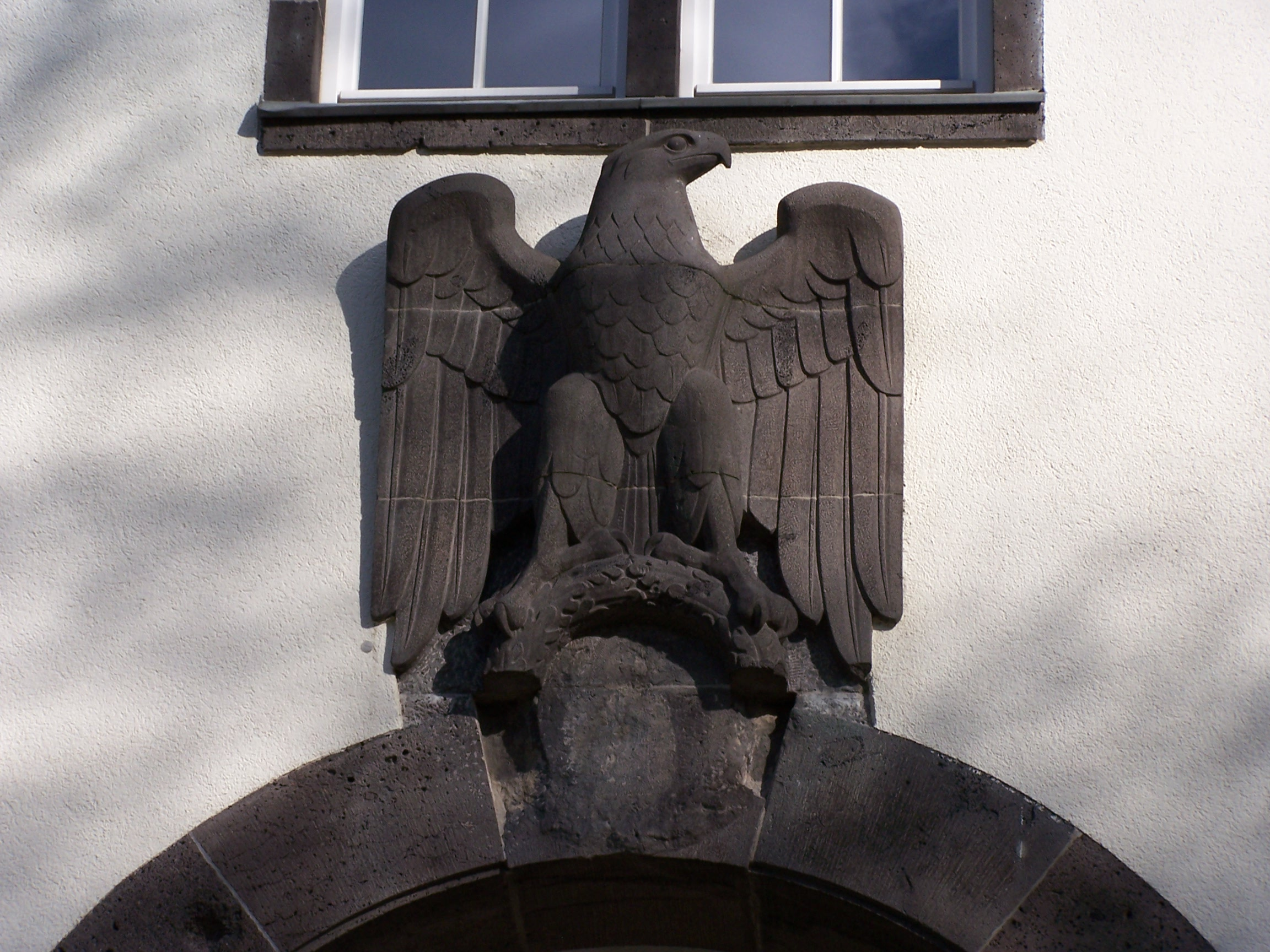
Eagle above the rear main entry to the Robert-Piloty building, department of Computer Science, Darmstadt University of Technology. Note the effaced Swastika under the eagle.

The Joint Chiefs of Staff Directive 1067 directed US Army General Dwight D. Eisenhower's policy of denazification. A report of the Institute on Re-education of the Axis Countries in June 1945 recommended: "Only an inflexible long-term occupation authority will be able to lead the Germans to a fundamental revision of their recent political philosophy." The United States military pursued denazification in a zealous and bureaucratic fashion, especially during the first months of the occupation. It had been agreed among the Allies that denazification would begin by requiring Germans to fill in a questionnaire (German: Fragebögen) about their activities and memberships during Nazi rule. Five categories were established: Major Offenders, Offenders, Lesser Offenders, Followers, and Exonerated Persons. The Americans, unlike the British, French, and Soviets, interpreted this to apply to every German over the age of 18 in their zone. Eisenhower initially estimated that the denazification process would take 50 years.

When the nearly complete list of Nazi Party memberships was turned over to the Allies (by a German anti-Nazi who had rescued it from destruction in April 1945 as American troops advanced on Munich), it became possible to verify claims about participation or non-participation in the Party. The 1.5 million Germans who had joined before Hitler came to power were deemed to be hard-core Nazis. In May and June 1945, 700 were arrested daily, and 18,000 total by August. By September, 82,000 were in internment camps.

Progress was slowed by the overwhelming numbers of Germans to be processed and by difficulties such as incompatible power systems and power outages, as with the Hollerith IBM data machine that held the American vetting list in Paris. As many as 40,000 forms could arrive in a single day to await processing. By December 1945, even though a full 500,000 forms had been processed, there remained a backlog of 4,000,000 forms from POWs and a potential case load of 7,000,000. The Fragebögen were, of course, filled out in German. The number of Americans working on denazification was inadequate to handle the workload, partly as a result of the demand in the US by families to have soldiers returned home. Replacements were mostly unskilled and poorly trained. In addition, there was too much work to be done to complete the process of denazification by 1947, the year American troops were expected to be completely withdrawn from Europe.

Pressure also came from the need to find Germans to run their own country. General George Patton wondered if it was "silly to try to get rid of the most intelligent people in Germany". He wrote, "It is no more possible for a man to be a civil servant in Germany and not have paid lip service to Nazism than it is for a man to be a postmaster in America and not have paid lip service to the Democratic Party or Republican Party when it is in power". Patton told the press that a controversy over whether Fritz Schäffer was suitable as Minister President of Bavaria was "just like a Democrat-Republican election fight".

Eisenhower replaced Patton with Lucius D. Clay as commander of Third United States Army and military governor of Bavaria for his statements. Nazis were, nonetheless, often the ones with training, experience, and willingness to cooperate ("if all the Nazis had been exceedingly unpleasant and rude, denazification would have been easy", one officer said); some non-party members probably had been turned down for membership, which made them less desirable than those who had joined. Those with individual natures great enough to defy Nazi rule probably would not work well under American rule. Schäffer—a leader in the Bavarian People's Party who had described the Nazis as "saviors of our Fatherland"—and Franz Oppenhoff in Aachen had shown that anti-Nazis did not necessarily believe in democracy.

Military Government Law No. 8, announced on 26 September 1945, probably as a reaction to the Patton and Schäffer cases, prohibited Nazi members from any business employment other than laborer. Local detachments applied the directive to public employment as well, causing (for example) Wasserburg am Inn to lose 20 doctors, likely the entire number. Ortsgruppenleiter, the lowest-priority detainees, had been just released but were immediately rearrested. In January 1946, a directive came from the Control Council entitled "Removal from Office and from Positions of Responsibility of Nazis and Persons Hostile to Allied Purposes". One of the punishments for Nazi involvement was to be barred from public office and/or restricted to manual labor or "simple work". At the end of 1945, 3.5 million former Nazis awaited classification, many of them barred from work in the meantime. By the end of the winter of 1945–1946, 42% of public officials had been dismissed. Malnutrition was widespread, and the economy needed leaders and workers to help clear away debris, rebuild infrastructure, and get foreign exchange to buy food and other essential resources.

Another concern leading to the Americans relinquishing responsibility for denazification and handing it over to the Germans arose from the fact that many of the American denazifiers were German Jews, former refugees returning to administer justice against the tormentors and killers of their relatives. It was felt, both among Germans and top American officials, that a desire for revenge might contaminate their objectivity.

As a result of these various pressures, and following a January 15, 1946, report of the Military Government decrying the efficiency of denazification, saying, "The present procedure fails in practice to reach a substantial number of persons who supported or assisted the Nazis", it was decided to involve Germans in the process. In March 1946, the Law for Liberation from National Socialism and Militarism (German: Befreiungsgesetz) came into effect, turning over responsibility for denazification to the Germans.

The German-run denazification program differed in two ways: It differentiated between five levels of Nazi participation, and the length of prohibition from public life or business would be based on the scale of the crimes. Each zone had a Minister of Denazification. On April 1, 1946, a special law established 545 civilian tribunals under German administration (German: Spruchkammern), with a staff of 22,000 mostly lay judges, enough, perhaps, to start to work but too many for all the staff themselves to be thoroughly investigated and cleared. They had a case load of 900,000. Several new regulations came into effect in the setting up of the German-run tribunals, including the idea that the aim of denazification was now rehabilitation rather than merely punishment and that someone whose guilt might meet the formal criteria could also have their specific actions taken into consideration for mitigation. Efficiency thus improved, while rigor declined.

==== Justice procedures ====
Many people had to fill in a new background form, called a Meldebogen (replacing the widely disliked Fragebogen), and were given over to justice under a Spruchkammer, which assigned them to one of five categories:

- V. Persons Exonerated (German: Entlastete). No sanctions.
- IV. Followers (German: Mitläufer). Possible restrictions on travel, employment, and political rights, plus fines.
- III. Lesser Offenders (German: Minderbelastete). Placed on probation for two to three years with a list of restrictions. No internment.
- II. Offenders: Activists, Militants, and Profiteers, or Incriminated Persons (German: Belastete). Subject to immediate arrest and imprisonment up to ten years, performing reparation or reconstruction work, plus a list of other restrictions.
- I. Major Offenders (German: Hauptschuldige). Subject to immediate arrest, death, imprisonment with or without hard labor, plus a list of lesser sanctions.

Again, because the caseload was impossibly large, the German tribunals began to look for ways to speed up the process. Unless their crimes were serious, members of the Nazi Party born after 1919 were exempted on the grounds that they had been brainwashed. Disabled veterans were also exempted. To avoid the necessity of a slow trial in open court, which was required for those belonging to the most serious categories, more than 90% of cases were judged not to belong to the serious categories and therefore were dealt with more quickly.

More "efficiencies" followed. The tribunals accepted statements from other people regarding the accused's involvement in Nazism. These statements earned the nickname of Persilscheine, after advertisements for the laundry and whitening detergent Persil. There was corruption in the system, with Nazis buying and selling denazification certificates on the black market. Nazis who were found guilty were often punished with fines assessed in Reichsmarks, which had become nearly worthless. While the military government was aware of the fines' nominal cost, requiring a hearing for each case prevented mass acquittals of many individuals. In Bavaria, the Denazification Minister, Anton Pfeiffer, bridled under the "victor's justice", and presided over a system that reinstated 75% of officials the Americans had dismissed and reclassified 60% of senior Nazis. The denazification process lost a great deal of credibility, and there was often local hostility against Germans who helped administer the tribunals. Threats and even violence against tribunal members had become fairly commonplace.

By early 1947, the Allies held 90,000 Nazis in detention; another 1,900,000 were forbidden to work as anything but manual laborers. From 1945 to 1950, the Allied powers detained over 400,000 Germans in internment camps in the name of denazification.

By 1948, the Cold War was clearly in progress, and the US began to worry more about a threat from the Eastern Bloc rather than the latent Nazism within occupied Germany.

The delicate task of distinguishing those truly complicit in or responsible for Nazi activities from mere "followers" made the work of the courts yet more difficult. US President Harry S. Truman alluded to this problem: "though all Germans might not be guilty for the war, it would be too difficult to try to single out for better treatment those who had nothing to do with the Nazi regime and its crimes." Denazification was from then on supervised by special German ministers, like the Social Democrat Gottlob Kamm in Baden-Württemberg, with the support of the US occupation forces.

Contemporary American critics of denazification denounced it as a "counterproductive witch hunt" and a failure; in 1951, the provisional West German government granted amnesties to lesser offenders and ended the program.

==== Censorship ====
While judicial efforts were handed over to German authorities, the US Army continued its efforts to denazify Germany through control of German media. The Information Control Division of the US Army had by July 1946 taken control of 37 German newspapers, six radio stations, 314 theaters, 642 cinemas, 101 magazines, 237 book publishers, and 7,384 book dealers and printers. Its main mission was democratization, but part of the agenda was also the prohibition of any criticism of the Allied occupation forces. In addition, on May 13, 1946, the Allied Control Council issued a directive for the confiscation of all media that could contribute to Nazism or militarism. Consequently, a list was drawn up of over 30,000 book titles, ranging from school textbooks to poetry, which were then banned. All the millions of copies of these books were to be confiscated and destroyed; the possession of a book on the list was made a punishable offense. The representative of the Military Directorate admitted that the order was in principle no different from the Nazi book burnings.

The censorship in the US zone was regulated by the occupation directive JCS 1067 (valid until July 1947) and in the May 1946 order valid for all zones (rescinded in 1950), Allied Control Authority Order No. 4, "No. 4 – Confiscation of Literature and Material of a Nazi and Militarist Nature". All confiscated literature was reduced to pulp instead of being burned. (Note: In August 1946, the order was amended so that "In the interest of research and scholarship, the Zone Commanders (in Berlin, the Komendantura) may preserve a limited number of documents prohibited in paragraph 1. These documents will be kept in special accommodation where they may be used by German scholars and other German persons who have received permission to do so from the Allies only under strict supervision by the Allied Control Authority.") It was also directed by Directive No. 30, "Liquidation of German Military and Nazi Memorials and Museums". An exception was made for tombstones "erected at the places where members of regular formations died on the field of battle".

Artworks were under the same censorship as other media: "all collections of works of art related or dedicated to the perpetuation of German militarism or Nazism will be closed permanently and taken into custody." The directives were very broadly interpreted, leading to the destruction of thousands of paintings, and thousands more were shipped to deposits in the US. Those confiscated paintings still surviving in US custody include for example a painting "depicting a couple of middle aged women talking in a sunlit street in a small town". Artists were also restricted in which new art they were allowed to create; "OMGUS was setting explicit political limits on art and representation".

The publication Der Ruf (The Call) was a popular literary magazine first published in 1945 by Alfred Andersch and edited by Hans Werner Richter. Der Ruf, also called Independent Pages of the New Generation, claimed to have the aim of educating the German people about democracy. In 1947, its publication was blocked by the American forces for being overly critical of the occupation government. Richter attempted to print many of the controversial pieces in a volume entitled Der Skorpion (The Scorpion). The occupational government blocked publication of Der Skorpion before it began, saying that the volume was too "nihilistic".

Publication of Der Ruf resumed in 1948 under a new publisher, but Der Skorpion was blocked and not widely distributed. Unable to publish his works, Richter founded Group 47.

The Allied costs for occupation were charged to the German people. A newspaper that revealed the charges (including, among other things, thirty thousand bras) was banned by the occupation authorities for disclosing this information.

==== Fragebogen ====
In 1946, the U.S. zone implemented a comprehensive survey known as the Fragebogen (questionnaire). The survey was used to identify the level of involvement post-war Germans had had with the Nazi regime. It was the initial tool in the process of identifying and purging Nazi influence from positions of power and public life. The survey consisted of 131 questions about personal information, political affiliation, military service, professional activities, financial and social status, and cultural and educational activities. The vast variety of questions allowed the Allies to assess, categorize, and determine eligibility for positions in government, education, and business.

An early version was created in 1944 by the Supreme Headquarters Allied Expeditionary Force (SHAEF). This original version of the Fragebögen set the foundation of later questionnaires that were created by the Allies in the different occupation zones. The early version consisted of 78 questions and asked about one's profession. In comparison, the 131-question survey asked more personal questions and allowed respondents to write comments and explanations for any responses needing clarification.

The inspiration for both variations of the questionnaire came from the Scheda Personale, which was created in 1943 by political scientist Aldo L. Raffa. The goal of the document was similar to the denazification questionnaire but was aimed at the defascization of Italy from the former fascists under Mussolini.

In addition to the removal of Nazis from influential positions in government, education, and business, Mikkel Dack argues that the Fragebogen had the effect of forcing a large part of Germany's postwar population to confront their relationship to the Nazi regime. Moreover, the Fragebogen gave many Germans the opportunity to rewrite their past and construct a new anti-Nazi identity, further helping to distance the country from National Socialism.

=== Soviet zone ===
From the beginning, denazification in the Soviet zone was considered a critical element of the transformation into a socialist society and was quickly and effectively implemented. Members of the Nazi Party and its organizations were often brutally beaten before being arrested and interned. The NKVD was directly in charge of this process and oversaw the camps. In 1948, the camps were placed under the same administration as the gulag in the Soviet government. According to official records, 122,600 people were interned; 34,700 of those interned in this process were considered to be Soviet citizens, with the rest being German. This process happened at the same time as the expropriation of large landowners and Junkers, who were also often former Nazi supporters.

Because part of the intended goal of denazification in the Soviet zone was also the removal of anti-socialist sentiment, the committees in charge of the process were politically skewed. A typical panel would have one member from the Christian Democratic Union, one from the Liberal Democratic Party of Germany, one from the Democratic Farmers' Party of Germany, one from the National Democratic Party of Germany (East Germany), three from the Socialist Unity Party of Germany, three from the National People's Army and three from political mass organizations (who were typically also supportive of the Socialist Unity Party).

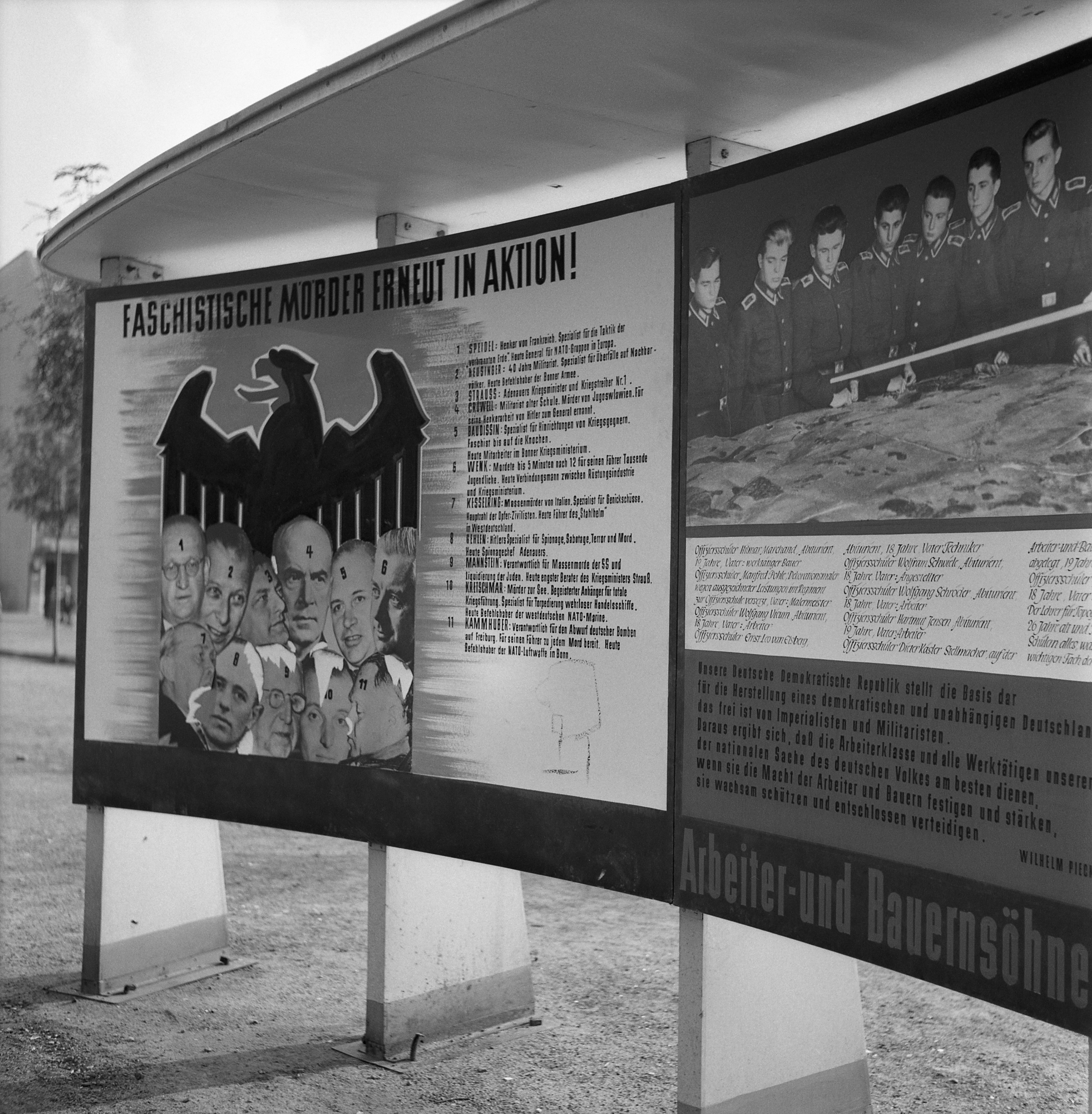
East German propaganda poster in 1957

Former Nazi officials quickly realized that they would face fewer obstacles and investigations in the zones controlled by the Western Allies. Many of them saw a chance to defect to the West on the pretext of anti-communism. Conditions in the internment camps were terrible, and between 42,000 and 80,000 prisoners died. When the camps were closed in 1950, prisoners were handed over to the East German government.

Because many of the functionaries of the Soviet occupation zone were themselves formerly prosecuted by the Nazi regime, mere former membership in the NSDAP was initially judged as a crime.

Even before denazification was officially abandoned in West Germany, East German propaganda frequently portrayed itself as the only true anti-fascist state, and argued that the West German state was simply a continuation of the Nazi regime, employing the same officials that had administered the government during the Nazi dictatorship. From the 1950s, the reasoning for these accusations focused on the fact that many former functionaries of the Nazi regime were employed in positions in the West German government. However, East German propaganda also attempted to denounce as Nazis even politicians such as Kurt Schumacher, who had been imprisoned by the Nazi regime himself. Such allegations appeared frequently in the official Socialist Unity Party of Germany newspaper, the Neues Deutschland. The East German uprising of 1953 in Berlin was officially blamed on Nazi agents provocateurs from West Berlin, who the Neues Deutschland alleged were then working in collaboration with the Western government with the ultimate aim of restoring Nazi rule throughout Germany. The Berlin Wall was officially called the Anti-Fascist Security Wall (German: Antifaschistischer Schutzwall) by the East German government. As part of the propagandistic campaign against West Germany, Theodor Oberländer and Hans Globke, both former Nazi leaders involved in genocide, were among the first federal politicians to be denounced in the GDR. Both were sentenced to life imprisonment in absentia by the GDR in April 1960 and in July 1963. The president of West Germany Heinrich Lübke, in particular, was denounced during the official commemorations of the liberation of the concentration camps of Buchenwald and Sachsenhausen held at the GDR's National Memorials.

However, in reality, substantial numbers of former Nazis rose to senior levels in East Germany. For example, those who had collaborated after the war with the Soviet occupation forces could protect Nazi members from prosecution, enabling them to continue working. Having special connections with the occupiers in order to have someone vouch for them could also shield a person from the denazification laws. In particular, the districts of Gera, Erfurt, and Suhl had significant amounts of former Nazi Party members in their government, whilst 13.6% of senior SED officials in Thuringia were former members of the Nazi Party. Notable ex-Nazis who eventually became prominent East German politicians included Kurt Nier, a deputy minister for foreign affairs, and Arno Von Lenski, a parliamentarian and major-general in the East German army who had worked in Roland Freisler's notorious Volksgerichtshof trying opponents of the Nazi government as an effective kangaroo court. Von Lenski was a member of the NPPD, a political party set up by East German authorities upon the encouragement of Stalin explicitly to appeal to former Nazi members and sympathisers, and which functioned as a loyal satellite of the Socialist Unity Party.

=== British zone ===
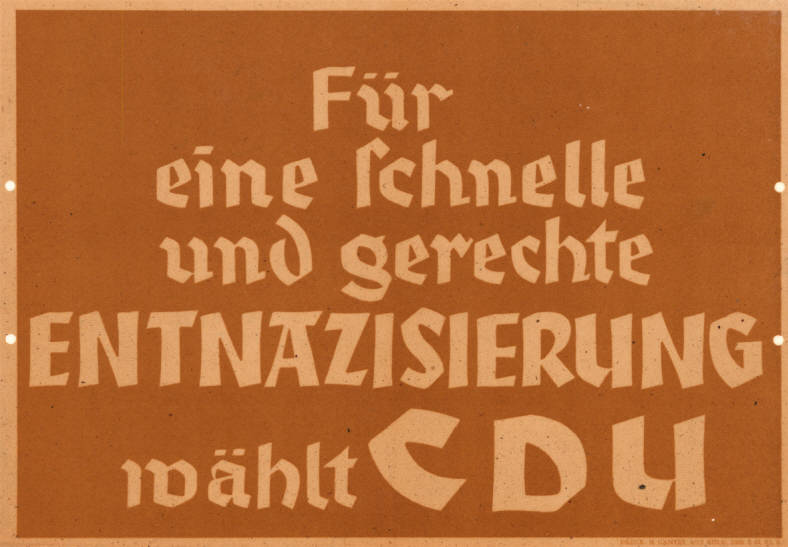
A poster from the North Rhine-Westphalia state elections 1947, with the slogan "For a quick and just denazification vote CDU"

The British prepared a plan from 1942 onwards, assigning a number of quite junior civil servants to head the administration of liberated territory in the rear of the Armies, with draconian powers to remove from their posts, in both public and private domains, anyone suspected, usually on behavioral grounds, of harboring Nazi sympathies. For the British government, the rebuilding of German economic power was more important than the imprisonment of Nazi criminals. Economically hard pressed at home after the war, Britain did not want the burden of feeding and otherwise administering Germany.

In October 1945, in order to constitute a working legal system, and given that 90% of German lawyers had been members of the Nazi Party, the British decided that 50% of the German Legal Civil Service could be staffed by "nominal" Nazis. Similar pressures caused them to relax the restriction even further in April 1946. In industry, especially in the economically crucial Ruhr area, the British began by being lenient about who owned or operated businesses, turning stricter by autumn of 1945. To reduce the power of industrialists, the British expanded the role of trade unions, giving them some decision-making powers.

They were, however, especially zealous during the early months of occupation in bringing to justice anyone, soldiers or civilians, who had committed war crimes against POWs or captured Allied aircrew. In June 1945, an interrogation center at Bad Nenndorf was opened, where detainees were tortured with exposure to cold, beatings, sleep deprivation, denial of food, etc. A public scandal ensued, with the center eventually being closed down.

The British, to some extent, avoided being overwhelmed by the potential numbers of denazification investigations by requiring that no one need fill in the Fragebogen unless they were applying for an official or responsible position. This difference between American and British policy was decried by the Americans and caused some Nazis to seek shelter in the British zone.

In January 1946, the British started introducing German involvement in the denazification process, establishing denazification panels and an appeal body. Denazification was formally handed over to the zone's Land governments in October 1947.

=== French zone ===
The French were the most lenient of the other occupying powers, not calling the process "dénazification" directly but rather "épuration" (purification). Some French occupational commanders had even served in the collaborationist Vichy regime during the war, and had formed friendly relations with the Germans. Hence NSDAP membership was in and of itself was much less important than in the other zones.

That said, teachers having been strongly Nazified, the French began by removing three-quarters of all teachers from their jobs. However, finding that the schools could not be run without them, they were soon rehired, albeit subject to easy dismissal –a similar process applied to technical experts. The French were the first to turn over the vetting process to the Germans, whilst maintaining French power to reverse any German decision. Overall, the business of denazification in the French zone was considered a "golden mean between an excessive degree of severity and an inadequate standard of leniency", laying the groundwork for an enduring reconciliation between France and Germany. In the French zone, only thirteen Germans were categorized as "major offenders".

== Brown book ==
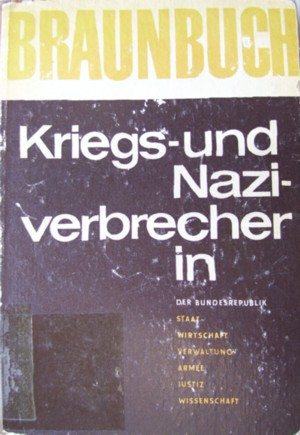
Braunbuch

Braunbuch – Kriegs- und Naziverbrecher in der Bundesrepublik: Staat – Wirtschaft – Verwaltung – Armee – Justiz – Wissenschaft (English title: Brown Book – War and Nazi Criminals in the Federal Republic: State, Economy, Administration, Army, Justice, Science) is a book written by Albert Norden in 1965. In this book, Norden detailed 1,800 Nazis who maintained high-ranking positions in postwar West Germany.

Altogether 1,800 West German persons and their past were covered: especially 15 Ministers and state secretaries, 100 admirals and generals, 828 judges or state lawyers and high law officers, 245 officials of the Foreign Office and of embassies and consulates in leading position, 297 high police officers and officers of the Verfassungsschutz. The first brown book was seized in West Germany – on Frankfurt Book Fair – by judicial resolution.

The contents of this book received substantial attention in West Germany and other countries. The West German government stated, at that time, that it was "all falsification". Later on, however, it became clear that the data of the book were largely correct. Hanns Martin Schleyer, for example, really had been a member of the SS. The book was translated into 10 languages. Amongst the reactions to it was also a similar West German book of the same name, covering the topic of Nazis re-emerging in high-level positions in the GDR.

In addition to the Braunbuch the educational booklet Das ganze System ist braun (The whole system is brown) was published in the GDR.

== Responsibility and collective guilt ==
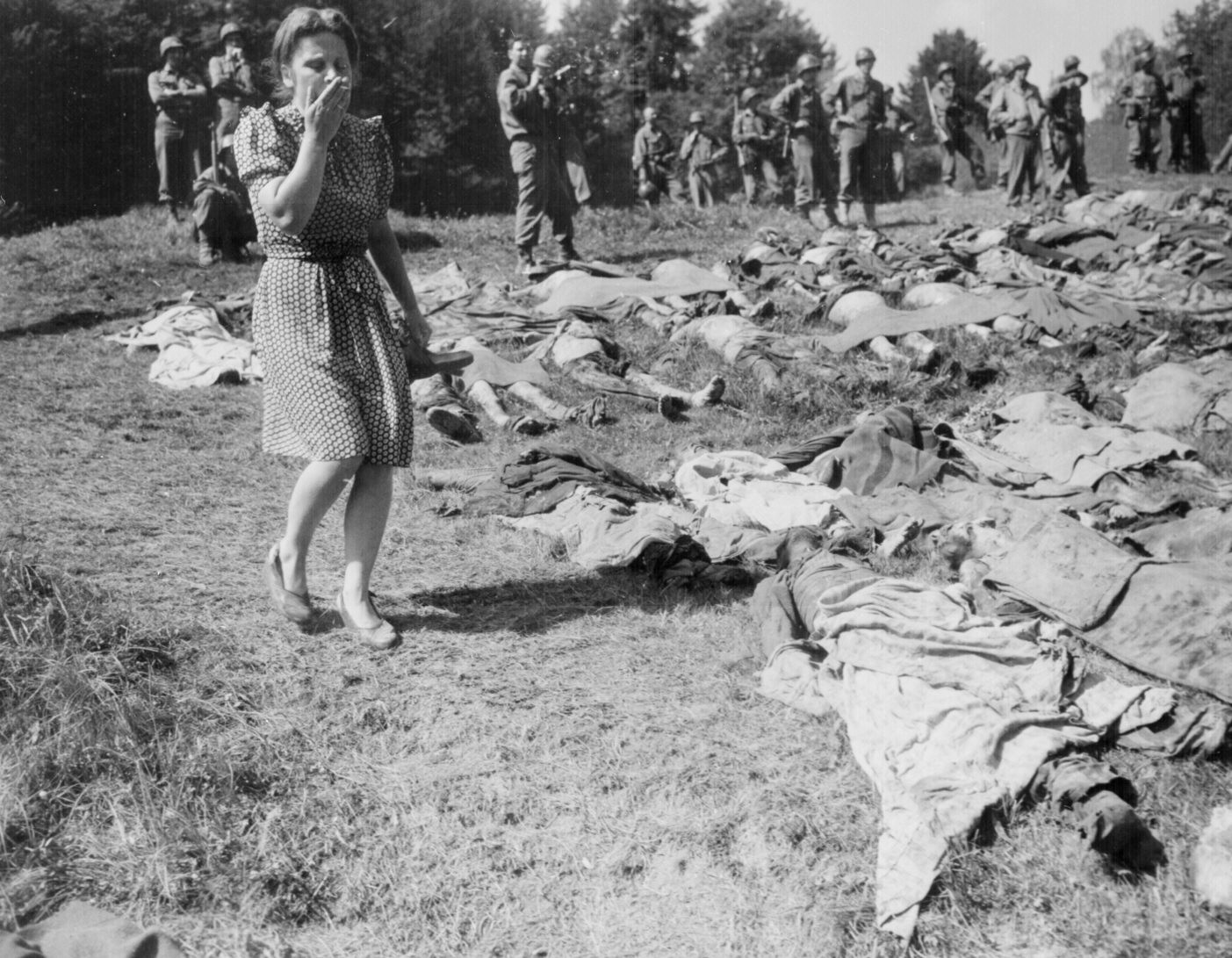
After the defeat of Nazi Germany, German civilians were sometimes forced to tour concentration camps and in some cases to exhume mass graves of Nazi victims. Nammering, May 17, 1945

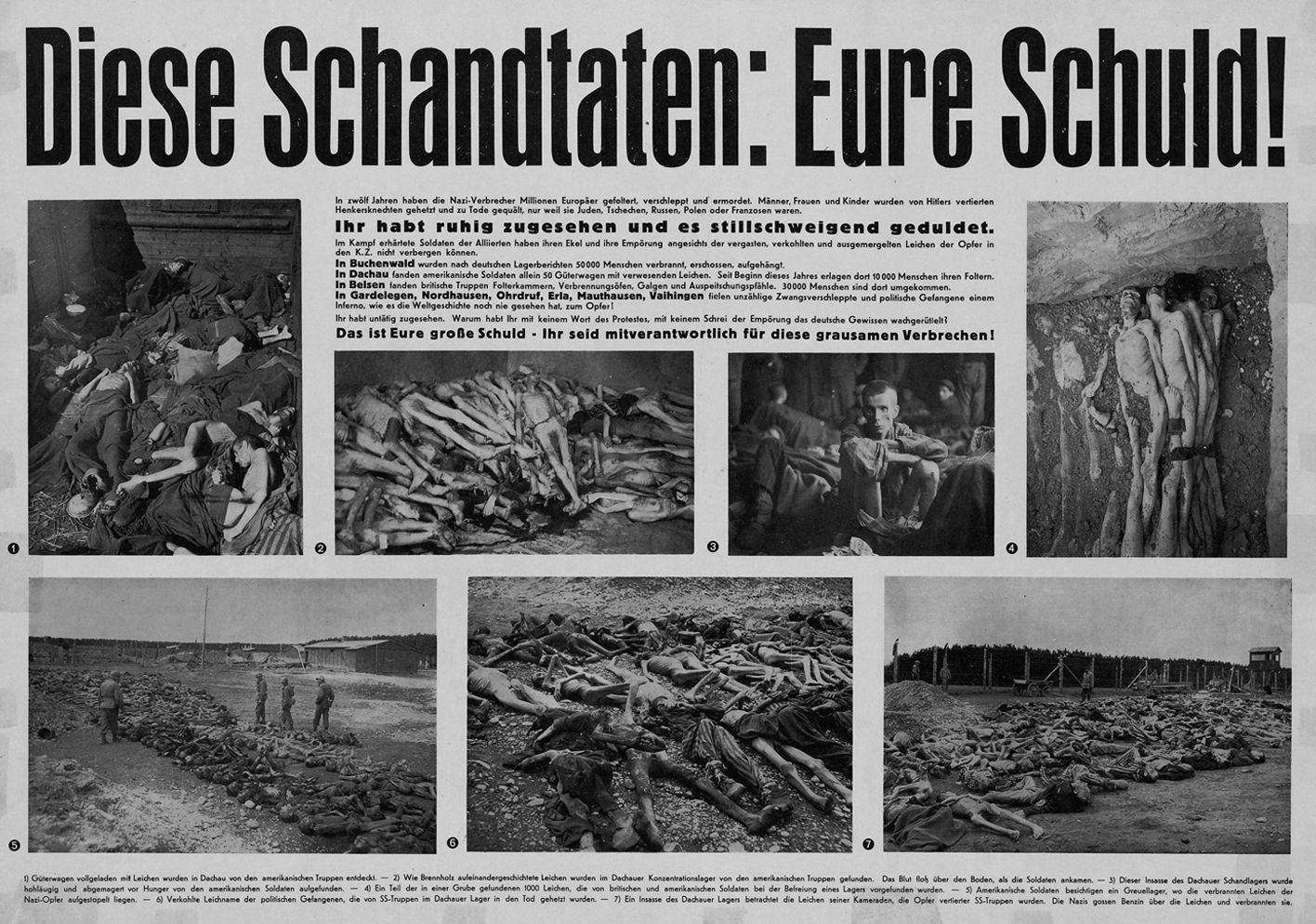
"Diese Schandtaten: Eure Schuld!" ("These atrocities: your fault!"), one of the propaganda posters distributed by US occupation authorities in the summer of 1945

The ideas of collective guilt and collective punishment originated not with the US and British people, but on higher policy levels. Not until late in the war did the US public assign collective responsibility to the German people. The most notable policy document containing elements of collective guilt and collective punishment is JCS 1067 from early 1945. Eventually horrific footage from the concentration camps would serve to harden public opinion and bring it more in line with that of policymakers.

As early as 1944, prominent US opinion makers had initiated a domestic propaganda campaign (which was to continue until 1948) arguing for a harsh peace for Germany, with a particular aim to end the apparent habit in the US of viewing the Nazis and the German people as separate entities.

Statements made by the British and US governments, both before and immediately after Germany's surrender, indicate that the German nation as a whole was to be held responsible for the actions of the Nazi regime, often using the terms "collective guilt" and "collective responsibility".

To that end, as the Allies began their post-war denazification efforts, the Psychological Warfare Division (PWD) of Supreme Headquarters Allied Expeditionary Force undertook a psychological propaganda campaign for the purpose of developing a German sense of collective responsibility.

In 1945, the Public Relations and Information Services Control Group of the British Element (CCG/BE) of the Allied Control Commission for Germany began to issue directives to officers in charge of producing newspapers and radio broadcasts for the German population to emphasize "the moral responsibility of all Germans for Nazi crimes". Similarly, among US authorities, such a sense of collective guilt was "considered a prerequisite to any long-term education of the German people".

Using the German press, which was under Allied control, as well as posters and pamphlets, a program was conducted which was intended to acquaint ordinary Germans with what had taken place in the concentration camps. An example of this was the use of posters with images of concentration camp victims coupled to text such as "YOU ARE GUILTY OF THIS!" or "These atrocities: your fault!" (Note: Eric Voegelin, Brenden Purcell "Hitler and the Germans", Footnote 12, p. 5 "In the summer of 1945, the Allies publicly displayed horrifying posters and reports from the Dachau and Belsen concentration camps with the accusatory headline 'Diese Schandtaten: Eure Schuld!' ('These atrocities: Your fault!')." See Christoph Klessmann, Die doppelte Staatsgrundung: Deutsche Geschichte, 1945–1955, p. 308)

English writer James Stern recounted an example in a German town soon after the German surrender:

[a] crowd is gathered around a series of photographs which though initially seeming to depict garbage instead reveal dead human bodies. Each photograph has a heading "WHO IS GUILTY?". The spectators are silent, appearing hypnotised and eventually retreat one by one. The placards are later replaced with clearer photographs and placards proclaiming "THIS TOWN IS GUILTY! YOU ARE GUILTY!"

The introduction text of one pamphlet published in 1945 by the American War Information Unit (Amerikanischen Kriegsinformationsamt) entitled Bildbericht aus fünf Konzentrationslagern (Photo Report from Five Concentration Camps) contained this explanation of the pamphlet's purpose:

Thousands of Germans who live near these places were led through the camps to see with their own eyes which crimes were committed in their name. But it is not possible for most Germans to view a KZ. This pictorial report is intended for them.

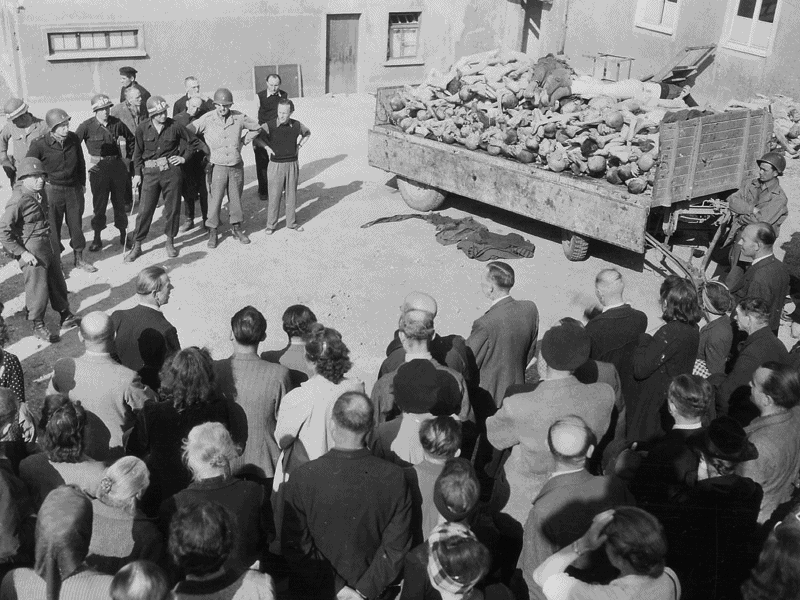
US Army soldiers show the German civilians of Weimar the corpses found in Buchenwald concentration camp, April 16, 1945.

A number of films showing the concentration camps were made and screened to the German public, such as Die Todesmühlen, released in the US zone in January 1946, and Welt im Film No. 5 in June 1945. A film that was never finished due partly to delays and the existence of the other films was Memory of the Camps. According to Sidney Bernstein, chief of Psychological Warfare Division, the objective of the film was:

To shake and humiliate the Germans and prove to them beyond any possible challenge that these German crimes against humanity were committed and that the German people – and not just the Nazis and SS – bore responsibility.

Immediately upon the liberation of the concentration camps, many German civilians were forced to see the conditions in the camps, bury rotting corpses and exhume mass graves. In some instances, civilians were also made to provide items for former concentration camp inmates.

== Surveys ==
The US conducted opinion surveys in the American zone of occupied Germany. Tony Judt, in his book Postwar: a History of Europe since 1945, extracted and used some of them.

- A majority in the years 1945–1949 stated Nazism to have been a good idea but badly applied.
- In 1946, 6% of Germans said the Nuremberg trials had been unfair.
- In 1946, 37% in the US occupation zone answered "no" to the statement "the extermination of the Jews and Poles and other non-Aryans was not necessary for the security of Germans".
- In 1946, 1 in 3 in the US occupation zone said that Jews should not have the same rights as those belonging to the Aryan race.
- In 1950, 1 in 3 said the Nuremberg trials had been unfair.
- In 1952, 37% said Germany was better off without the Jews on its territory.
- In 1952, 25% had a good opinion of Hitler.

British historian Ian Kershaw in his book The "Hitler Myth": Image and Reality in the Third Reich writes about the various surveys carried out at the German population:

- In 1945, 42% of young Germans and 22% of adult Germans thought that the reconstruction of Germany would be best applied by a "strong new Führer".
- In 1952, 10% of Germans thought that Hitler was the greatest statesman and that his greatness would only be realized at a later date; and 22% thought he had made "some mistakes" but was still an excellent leader.
- In 1953, 14% of Germans said they would vote for someone like Hitler again.

However, in Hitler, Germans, and the "Jewish Question", Sarah Ann Gordon notes the difficulty of drawing conclusions from the surveys. For example, respondents were given three alternatives from which to choose, as in question 1:

Statement	Percentage agreeing
Hitler was right in his treatment of the Jews:	0
Hitler went too far in his treatment of the Jews, but something had to be done to keep them in bounds:	19
The actions against the Jews were in no way justified:	77

To the question of whether an Aryan who marries a Jew should be condemned, 91% responded "No". To the question of whether "All those who ordered the murder of civilians or participated in the murdering should be made to stand trial", 94% responded "Yes".

Consequently, the implications of these alarming results have been questioned and rationalized; as another example, Gordon singles out the question "Extermination of the Jews and Poles and other non-Aryans was not necessary for the security of the Germans", which included an implicit double negative to which the response was either yes or no. She concludes that this question was confusingly phrased (given that in the German language the affirmative answer to a question containing a negative statement is "no"): "Some interviewees may have responded 'no' they did not agree with the statement, when they actually did agree that the extermination was not necessary." She further highlights the discrepancy between the antisemitic implications of the survey results (such as those later identified by Judt) with the 77% percent of interviewees who responded that actions against Jews were in no way justified.

== End ==
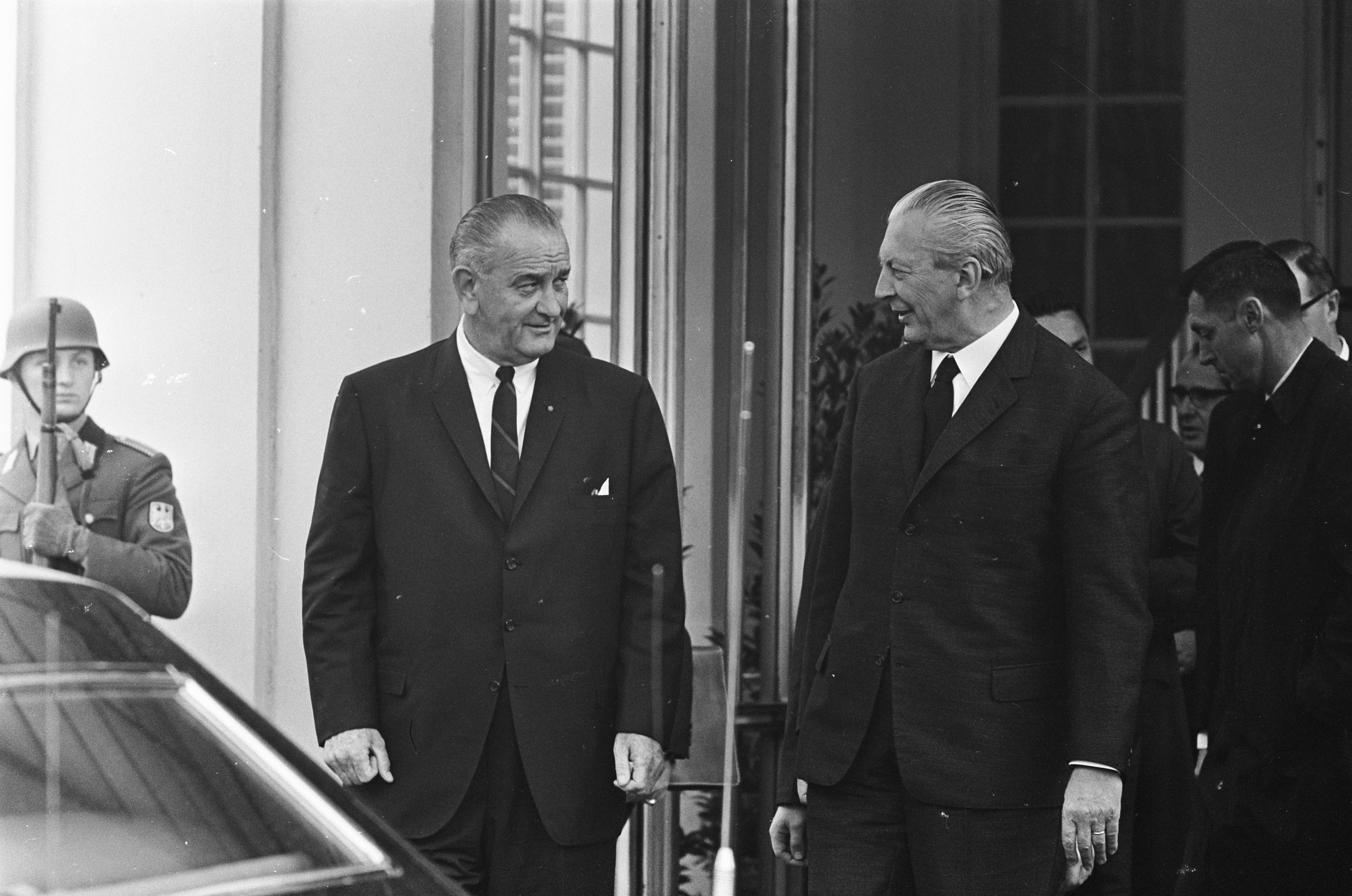
German Chancellor Kurt Georg Kiesinger (right) was a former member of the Nazi Party.

As new political parties such as CDU-CSU formed in the Western Allies' zones, they annoyed the occupation authorities by stating that only top Nazi leaders needed denazification and that others were Mussnazis, "Nazis by compulsion". The West German political system, as it emerged from the occupation, was increasingly opposed to the Allied denazification policy. As denazification was deemed ineffective and counterproductive by the Americans, they did not oppose the plans of the West German chancellor, Konrad Adenauer, to end the denazification efforts. Adenauer's intention was to switch government policy to reparations and compensation for the victims of Nazi rule (Wiedergutmachung), stating that the main culprits had been prosecuted. In 1951 several laws were passed, ending the denazification. Officials were allowed to retake jobs in the civil service, and hiring quotas were established for these previously excluded individuals, with the exception of people assigned to Group I (Major Offenders) and II (Offenders) during the denazification review process. These individuals were referred to as "131-ers", after Article 131 of Federal Republic's Basic Law.

Several amnesty laws were also passed which affected an estimated 792,176 people. Those pardoned included people with six-month sentences, 35,000 people with sentences of up to one year and include more than 3,000 functionaries of the SA, the SS, and the Nazi Party who participated in dragging victims to jails and camps; 20,000 other Nazis sentenced for "deeds against life" (presumably murder); 30,000 sentenced for causing bodily injury, and 5,200 who committed "crimes and misdemeanors in office". As a result, many people with a former Nazi past ended up again in the political apparatus of West Germany. In 1957, 77% of the German Ministry of Justice's senior officials were former Nazi Party members. Included in this ministry was Franz Massfeller, a former Nazi official who had participated in the meetings which followed the Wannsee Conference, in which the extermination of Jews was planned.

== Hiding one's Nazi past ==
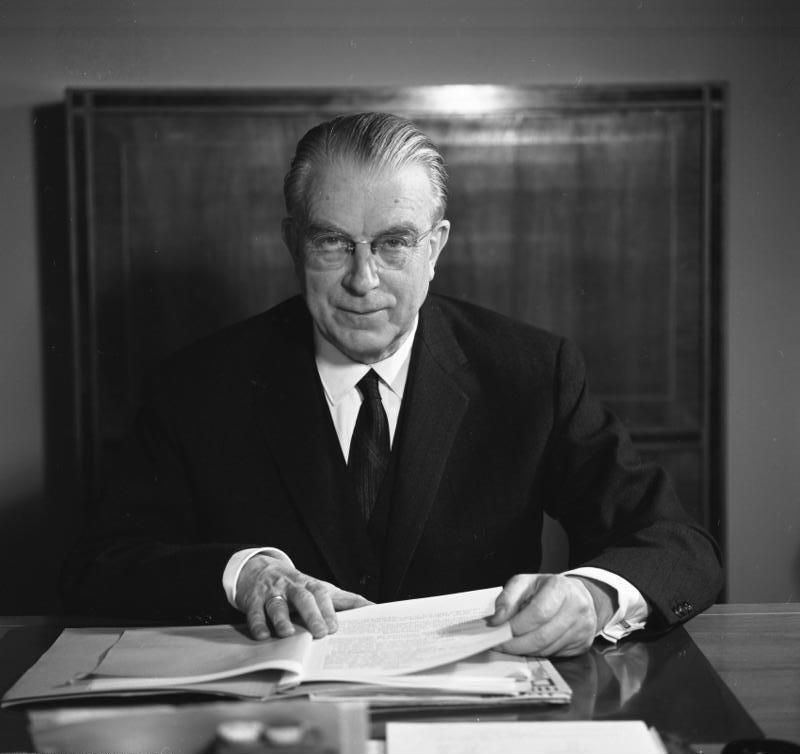
Adenauer's State Secretary Hans Globke had played a major role in drafting antisemitic Nuremberg Race Laws.

Membership in Nazi organizations is still not an open topic of discussion. German President Walter Scheel (1974 – 1979) and Chancellor Kurt Georg Kiesinger (1966 – 1969) were both former members of the Nazi Party. In 1950, a major controversy broke out when it emerged that Konrad Adenauer's State Secretary Hans Globke had played a major role in drafting antisemitic Nuremberg Race Laws in Nazi Germany. In the 1980s former UN Secretary General and President of Austria Kurt Waldheim was confronted with allegations he had lied about his wartime record in the Balkans.

It was not until 2006 that famous German writer Günter Grass, occasionally viewed as a spokesman of "the nation's moral conscience", spoke publicly about the fact that he had been a member of the Waffen-SS – he was conscripted into the Waffen-SS while barely seventeen years old and his duties were military in nature. Statistically, it was likely that there were many more Germans of Grass's generation (also called the "Flakhelfer-Generation") with biographies similar to his.

Joseph Ratzinger (later Pope Benedict XVI), on the other hand, was open about his membership at the age of fourteen of the Hitler Youth, when his church youth group was forced to merge with them.

== In other countries ==
In practice, denazification was not limited to Germany and Austria. In several European countries with a vigorous Nazi or fascist party, measures of denazification were carried out. In France the process was called épuration légale (legal cleansing). Prisoners of war held in detention in Allied countries were also subject to denazification qualifications before being returned to their countries of origin.

Denazification was also practiced in many countries which came under German occupation, including Belgium, Norway, Greece and Yugoslavia, because satellite regimes had been established in these countries with the support of local collaborators.

In Greece, for instance, Special Courts of Collaborators were created after 1945 to try former collaborators. The three Greek "quisling" prime ministers were convicted and sentenced to death or life imprisonment. Other Greek collaborators after German withdrawal underwent repression and public humiliation, besides being tried (mostly on treason charges). In the context of the emerging Greek Civil War, however, most wartime figures from the civil service, the Greek Gendarmerie and the notorious Security Battalions were quickly integrated into the strongly anti-Communist postwar establishment.

An attempt to ban the swastika across the EU in early 2005 failed after objections from the British government and others. In early 2007, while Germany held the European Union presidency, Berlin proposed that the European Union should follow German Criminal Law and criminalize the denial of the Holocaust and the display of Nazi symbols including the swastika, which is based on the Ban on the Symbols of Unconstitutional Organizations Act (Strafgesetzbuch section 86a). This led to an opposition campaign by Hindu groups across Europe against a ban on the swastika. They pointed out that the swastika has been around for 5,000 years as a symbol of peace. The proposal to ban the swastika was dropped by the German government from the proposed European Union wide anti-racism laws on January 29, 2007.

== See also ==
- Catharsis
- Collaboration with the Axis powers
- Damnatio memoriae
- De-Ba'athification
- Decommunization
- De-Francoization
- De-Stalinization
- Fascist (insult)
- German resistance to Nazism
- Gleichschaltung, the "Nazification" of Germany in the 1930s
- Historical Memory Law
- Holocaust trivialization
- List of streets named after Adolf Hitler
- Lustration
- Morgenthau Plan
- Neulehrer
- Pursuit of Nazi collaborators
- Secondary antisemitism
- Street name controversy
- Transitional justice
- Vergangenheitsbewältigung
- Japanese People's Anti-war Alliance
- Japanese People's Emancipation League
