= Oświęcim (1945 film) =

Oświęcim is a Soviet propaganda film (35mm black and white, of about 20 minutes in two reels) centering around the liberation of Auschwitz concentration camp, known in Polish as Oświęcim. The footage was shot directly after the liberation between January and May 1945 by camera operators of the Soviet army. The cameramen that filmed were Mikhail Ochourkov, Nikolai Bykov, Kenan Kutub-Zade, Alexander Vorontsov and Anatoly Pavlov and the editing was done by Yelizaveta Svilova. During the liberation of Auschwitz also photographers and artists were present. Some of Zinovii Tolkachev's drawings closely resemble shots from Oświęcim, as they depict the same scenes captured in the film.

Together with the Soviet propaganda film "Majdanek - Cemetery of Europe" (that deals with the liberation of the concentration camp "Majdanek" near Lublin), Oświęcim is the main source for audiovisual footage of Nazi concentration camps situated in Poland. Only the piles of corpses filmed in Bergen-Belsen by the British liberators have a similar iconic status. The child survivors showing their number tattoos, the camp gate of Auschwitz 1 with the motto "Arbeit macht frei", the areal shot of the barracks in Auschwitz-Birkenau, the emaciated camp inmates behind barbed wire and the piles of glasses, shoes and suitcases today are considered icons of the Holocaust.

Like the film about Majdanek and like the US-American, British and French re-education films (such as Death Mills, KZ, Deutschland erwache! and Les camps de la mort), Oświęcim does not acknowledge Jews as the main group of victims. This omission is striking given that the vast majority of those murdered at Auschwitz-Birkenau — and the majority of survivors encountered by the camera crews — were Jewish. In the case of Oświęcim, this absence was a direct result of Soviet censorship in Moscow, which mandated a focus on Soviet citizens as the primary victims.

The remaining material from the liberation of the camp, which was not used in this film, is stored in the Russian State Archive for Film and Photo Documents in Krasnogorsk. The Chronos documentary "Die Befreiung von Auschwitz" (The Liberation of Auschwitz, 1986) is based on this material. A 35mm copy of 1500 meters in length is stored in the German Federal Archives.

== Popcultural references ==
Material from Oświęcim appears in other films such as (selection): Film Documents of the Atrocities of the German Fascist Invaders (shown at the Nuremberg trials 1945), Death Mills (1945), Strange Victory (1948), Daleka Cesta (1949), Mein Kampf (1960), The 81st Blow (1974), Pillar of Fire (TV series) (1981), The Yellow Star: The Persecution of the Jews in Europe 1933–45 (1981), Genocide (1981 film), The Last Days (1998), Shoah, les oubliés de l’histoire (2014), The Number on Great-Grandpa's Arm (2018), The U.S. and the Holocaust (2022)

== Screenshots ==
Selection of well known shots from Oświęcim.

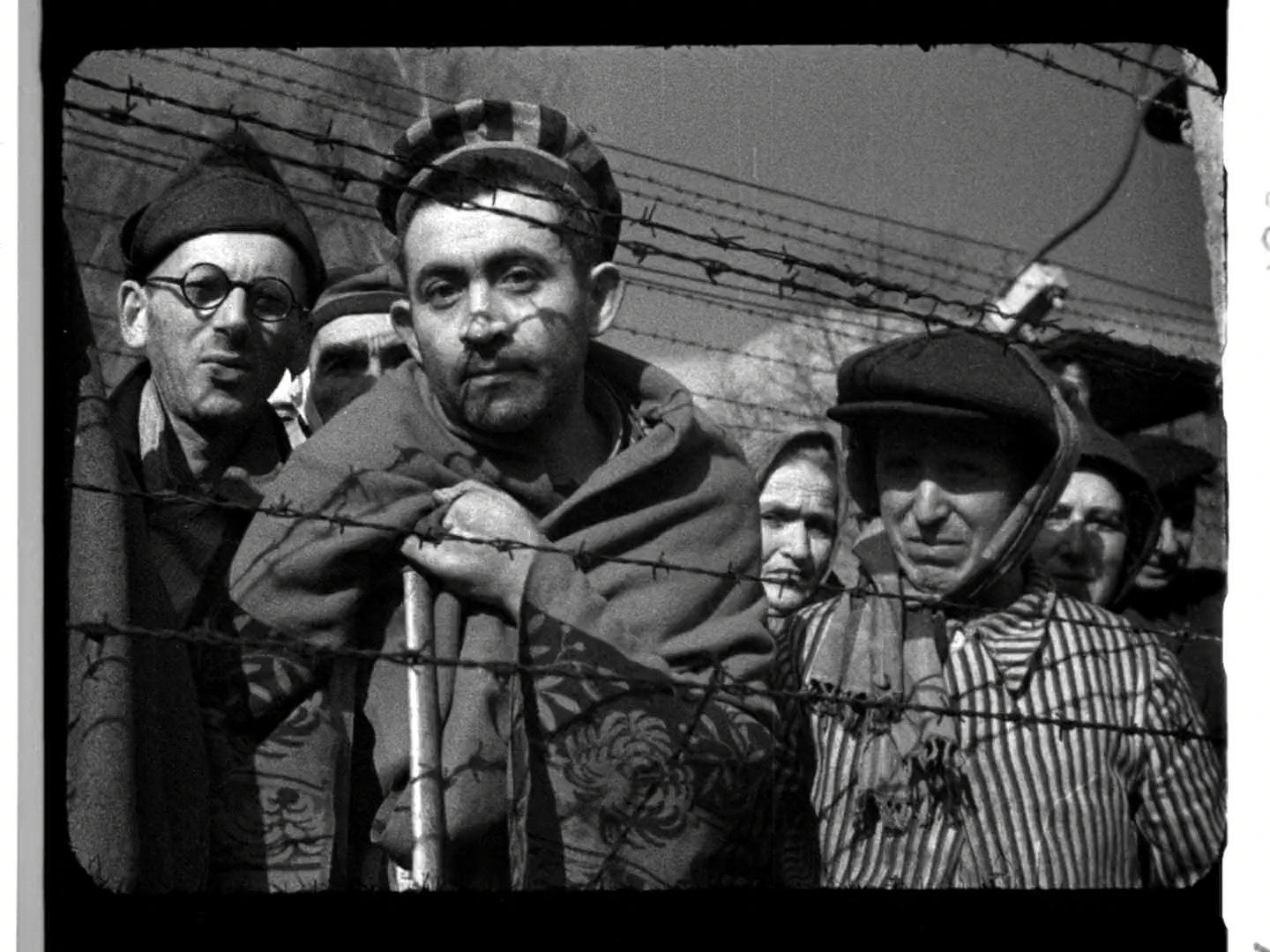

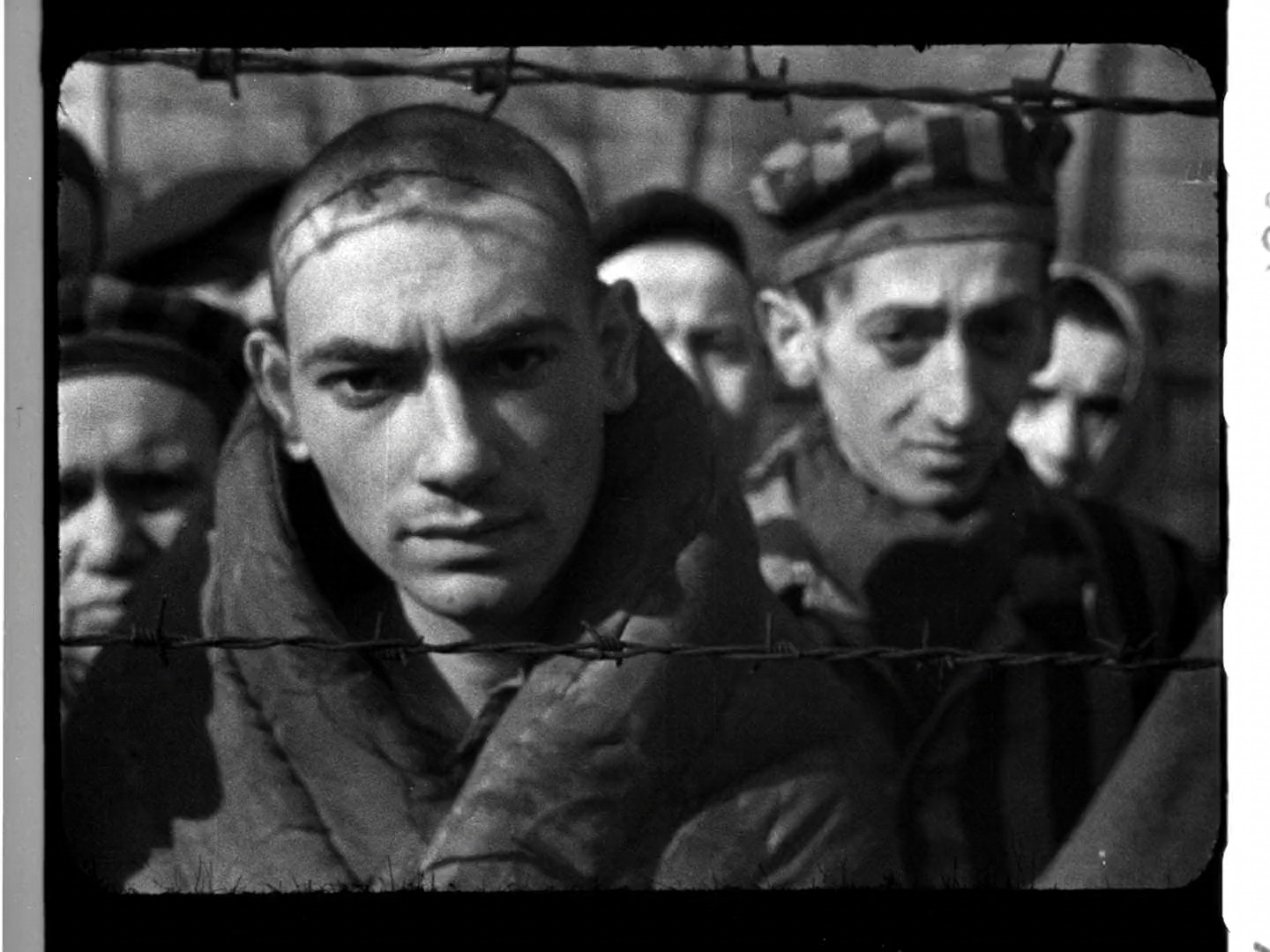

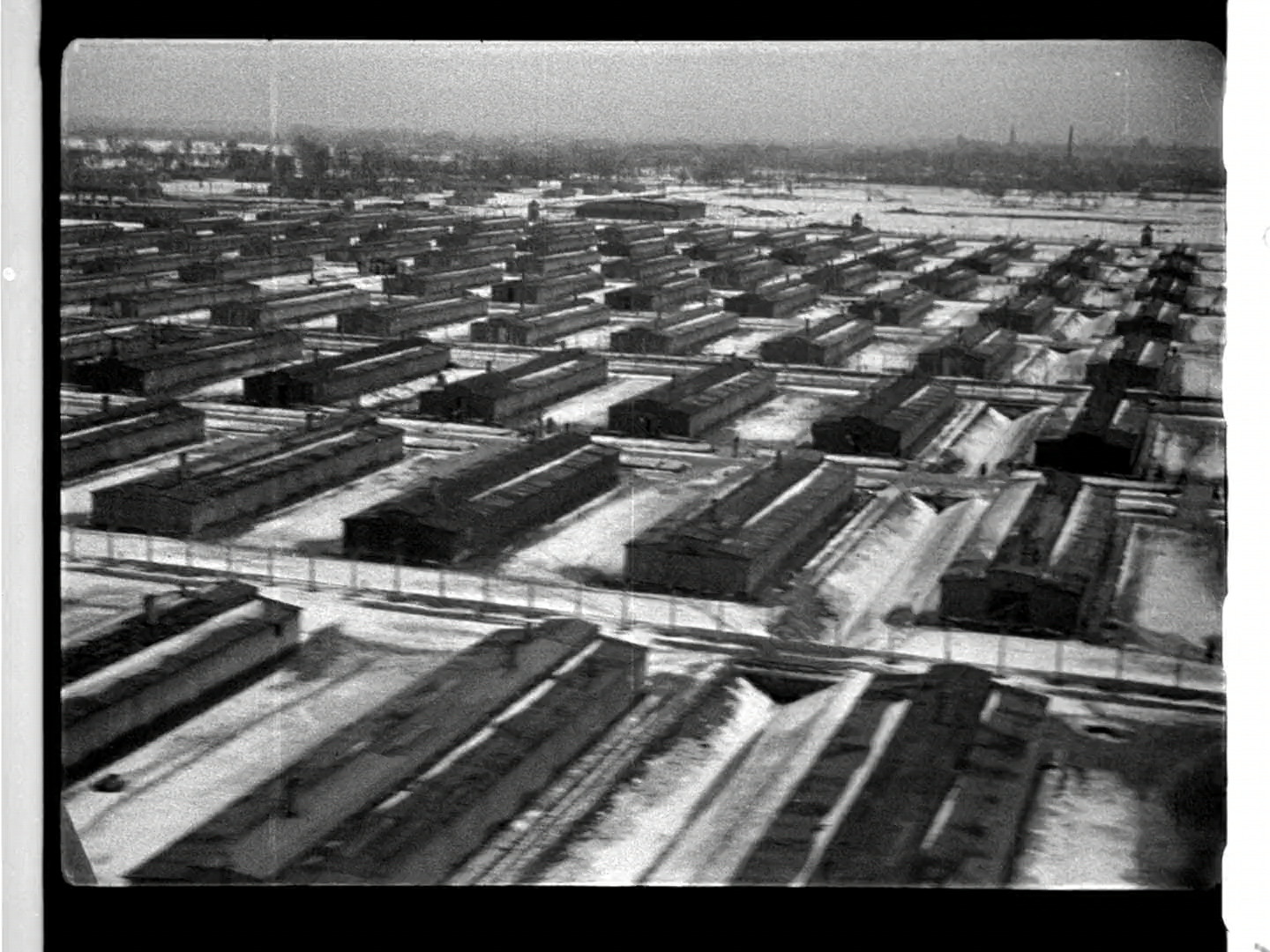

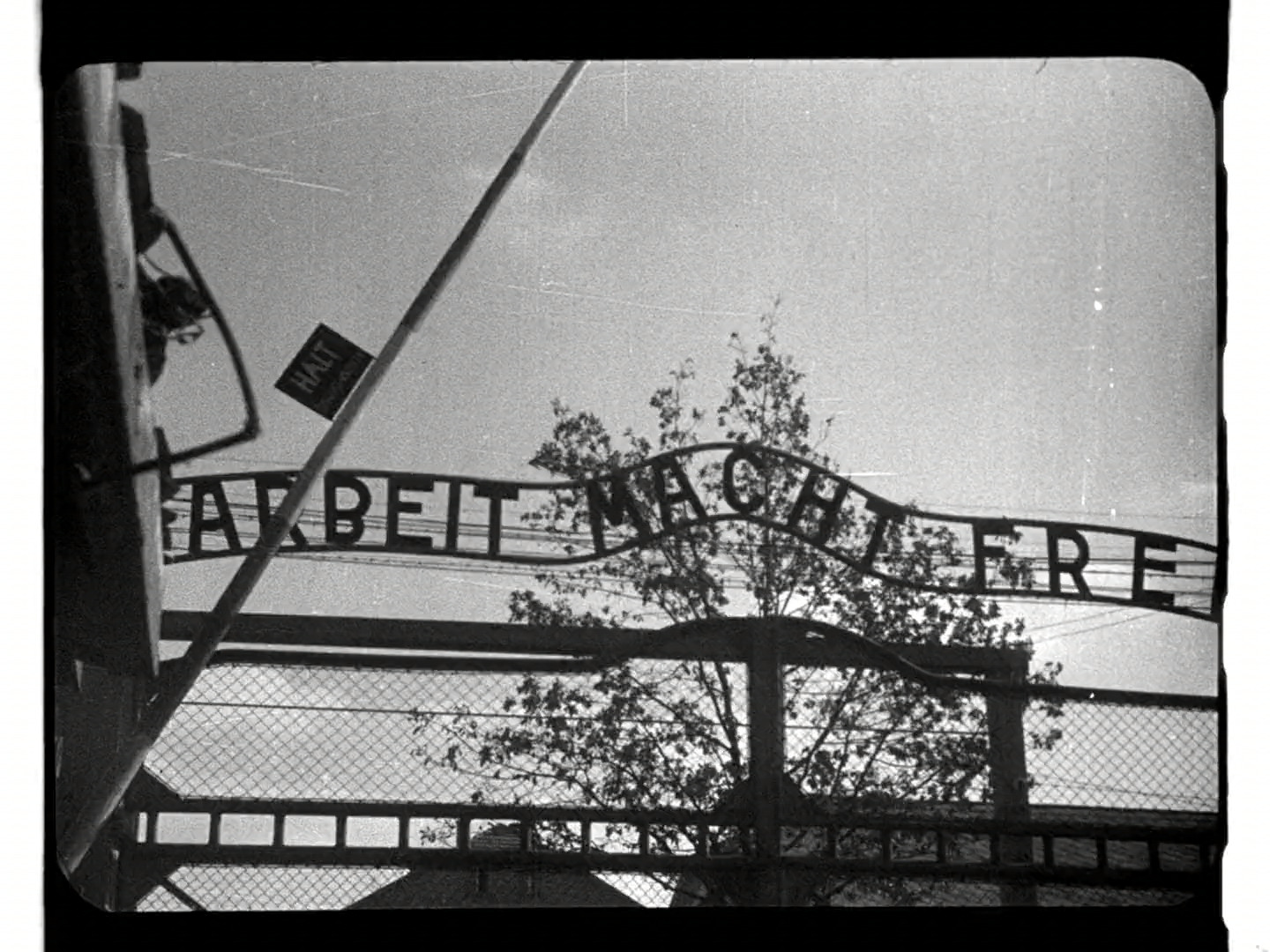

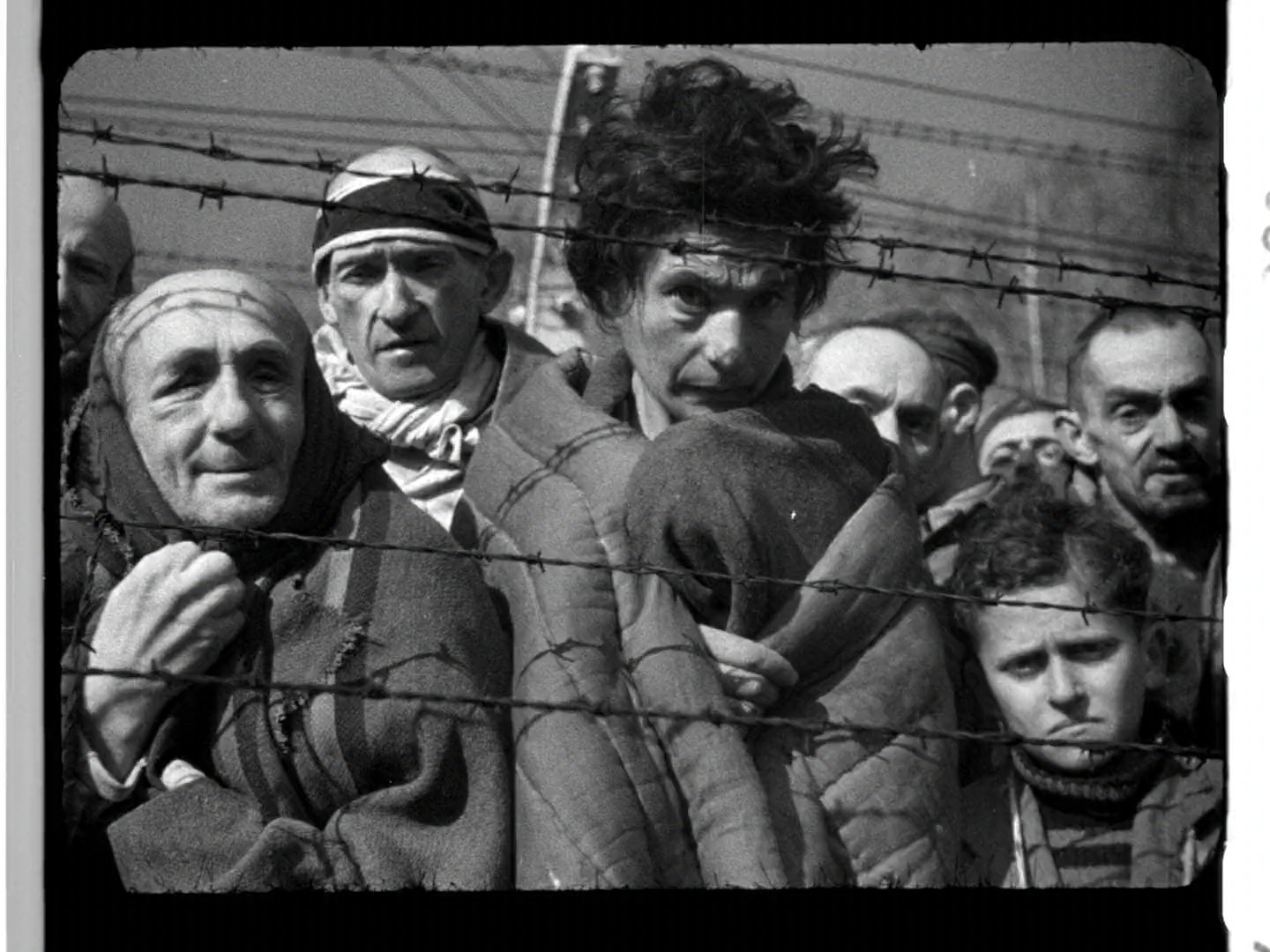

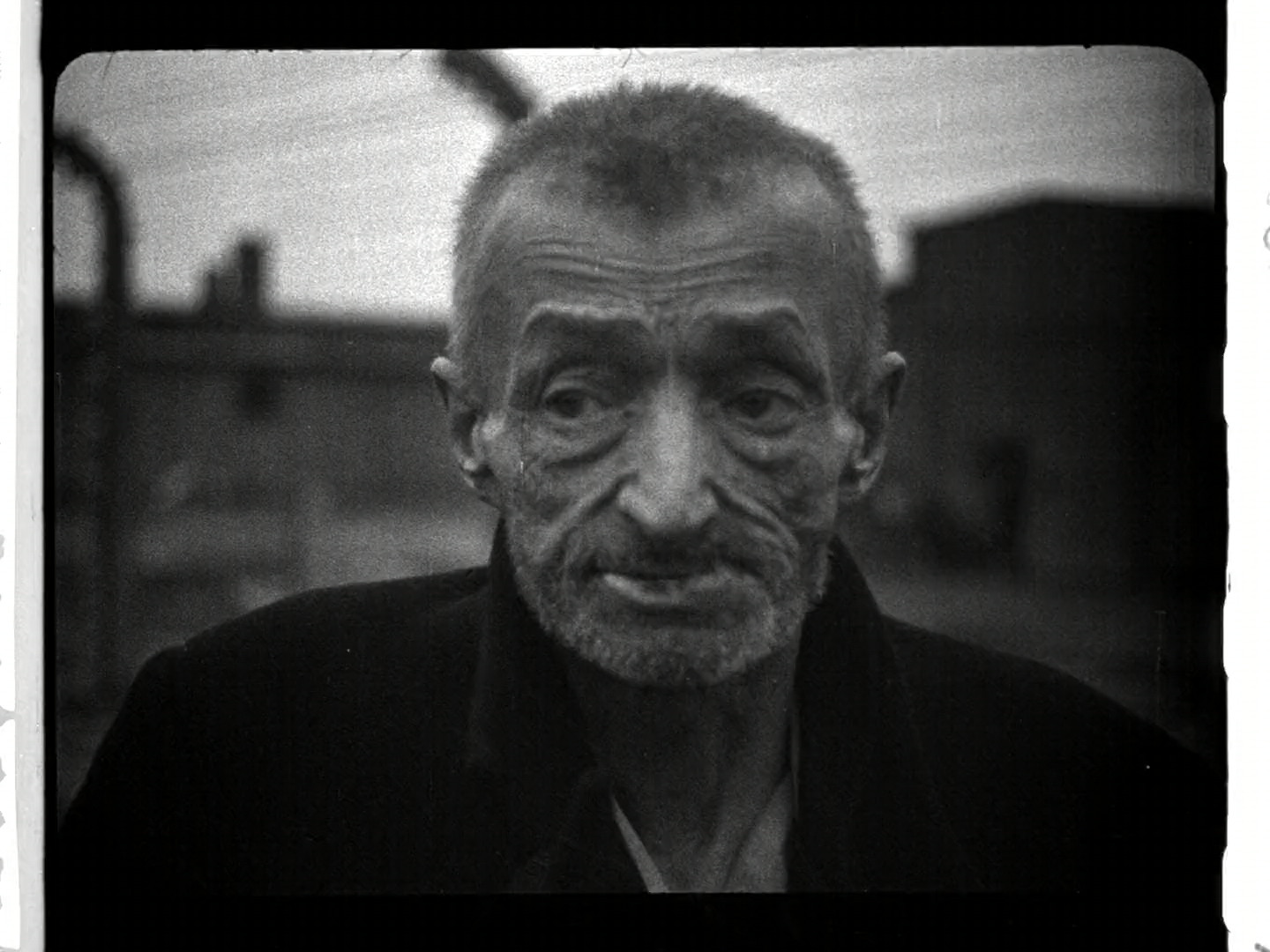

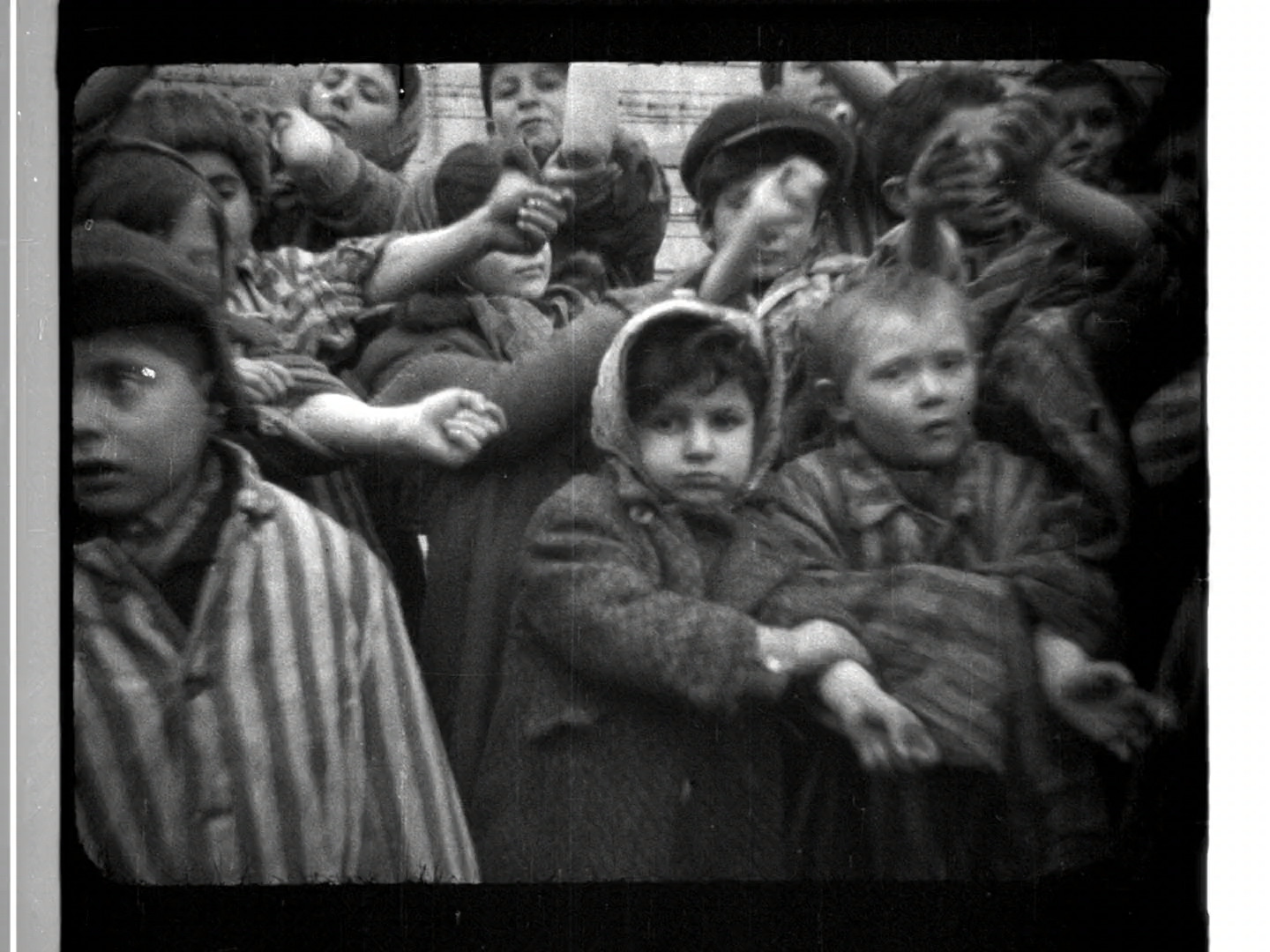

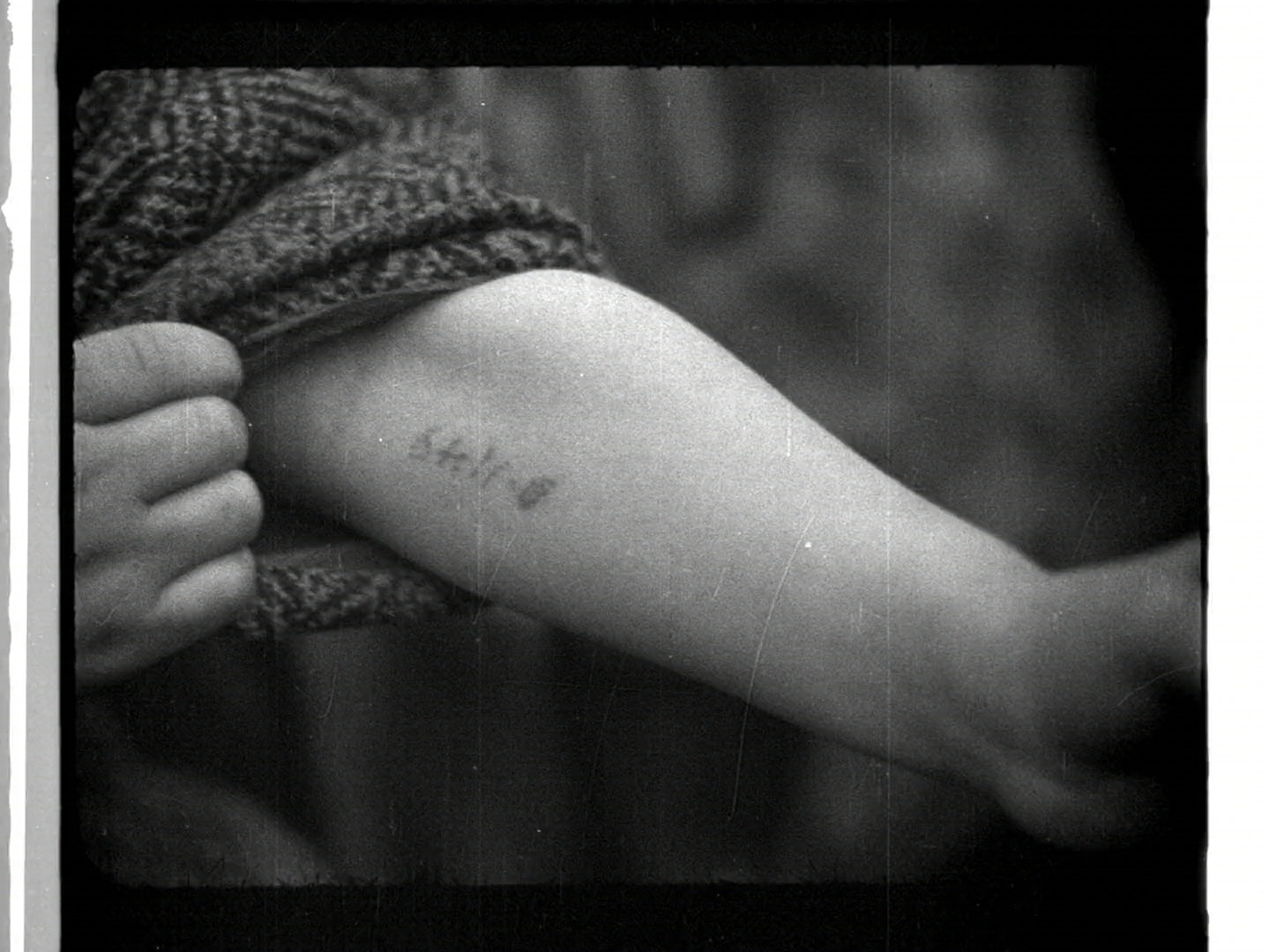

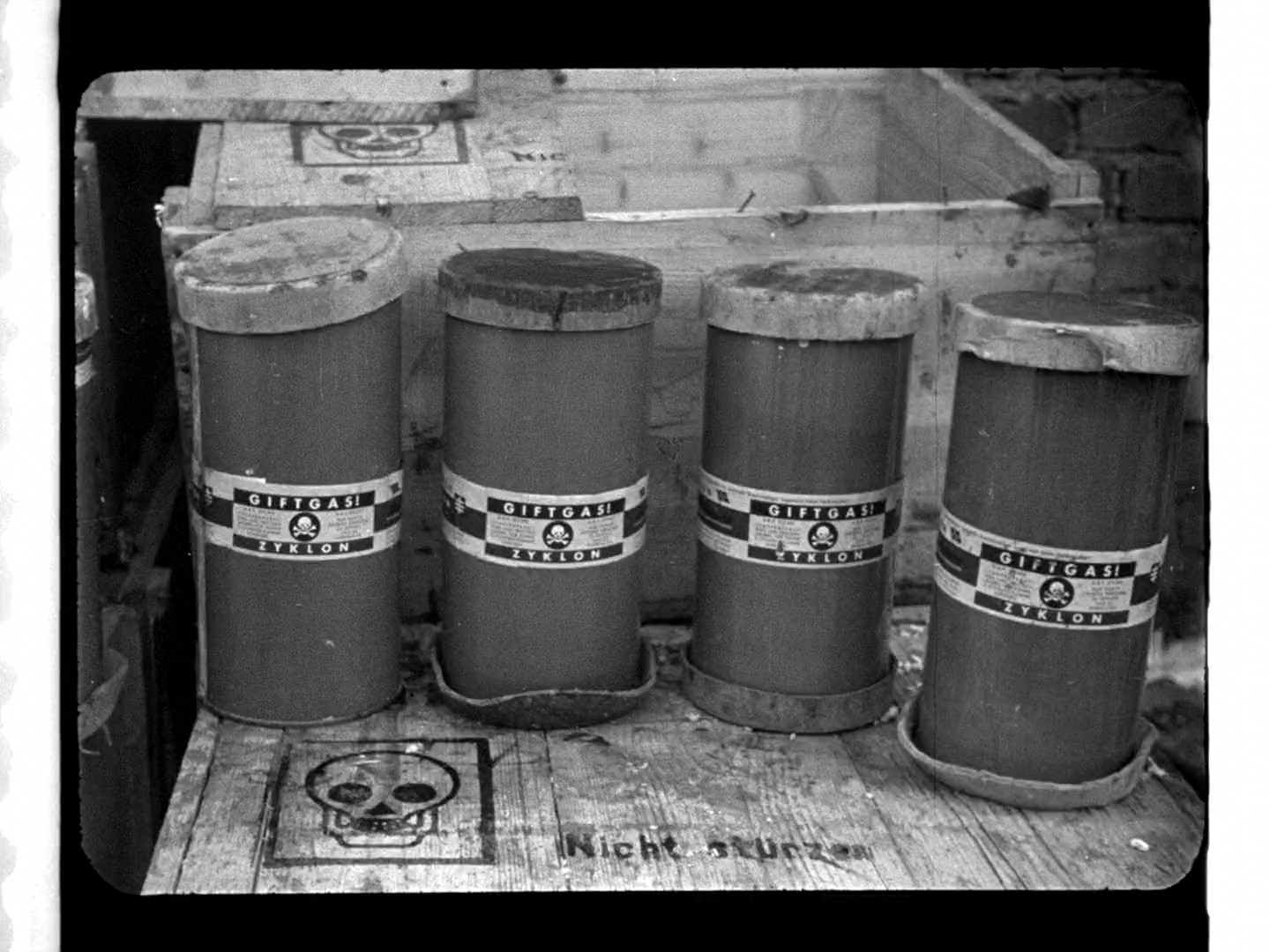

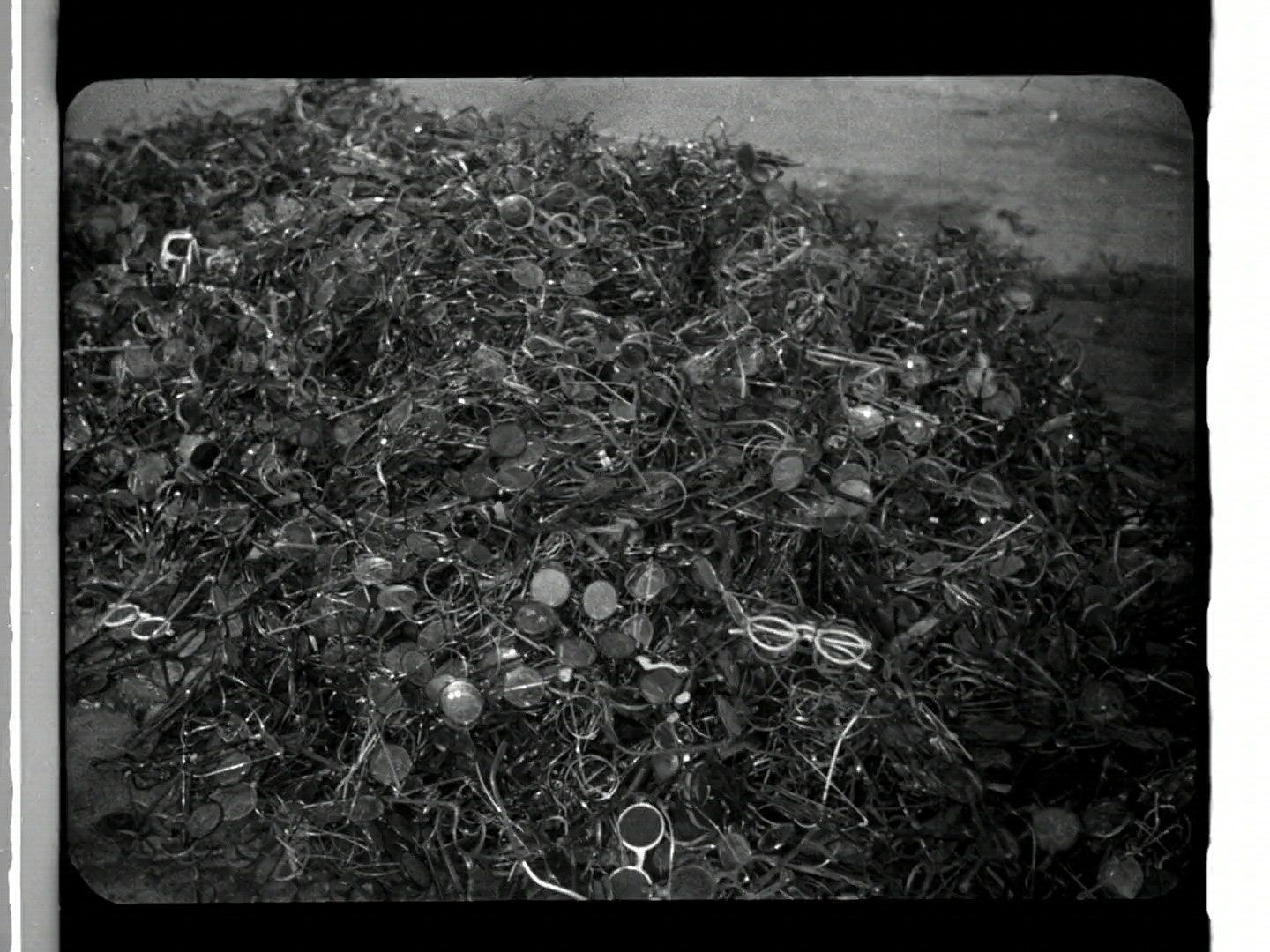

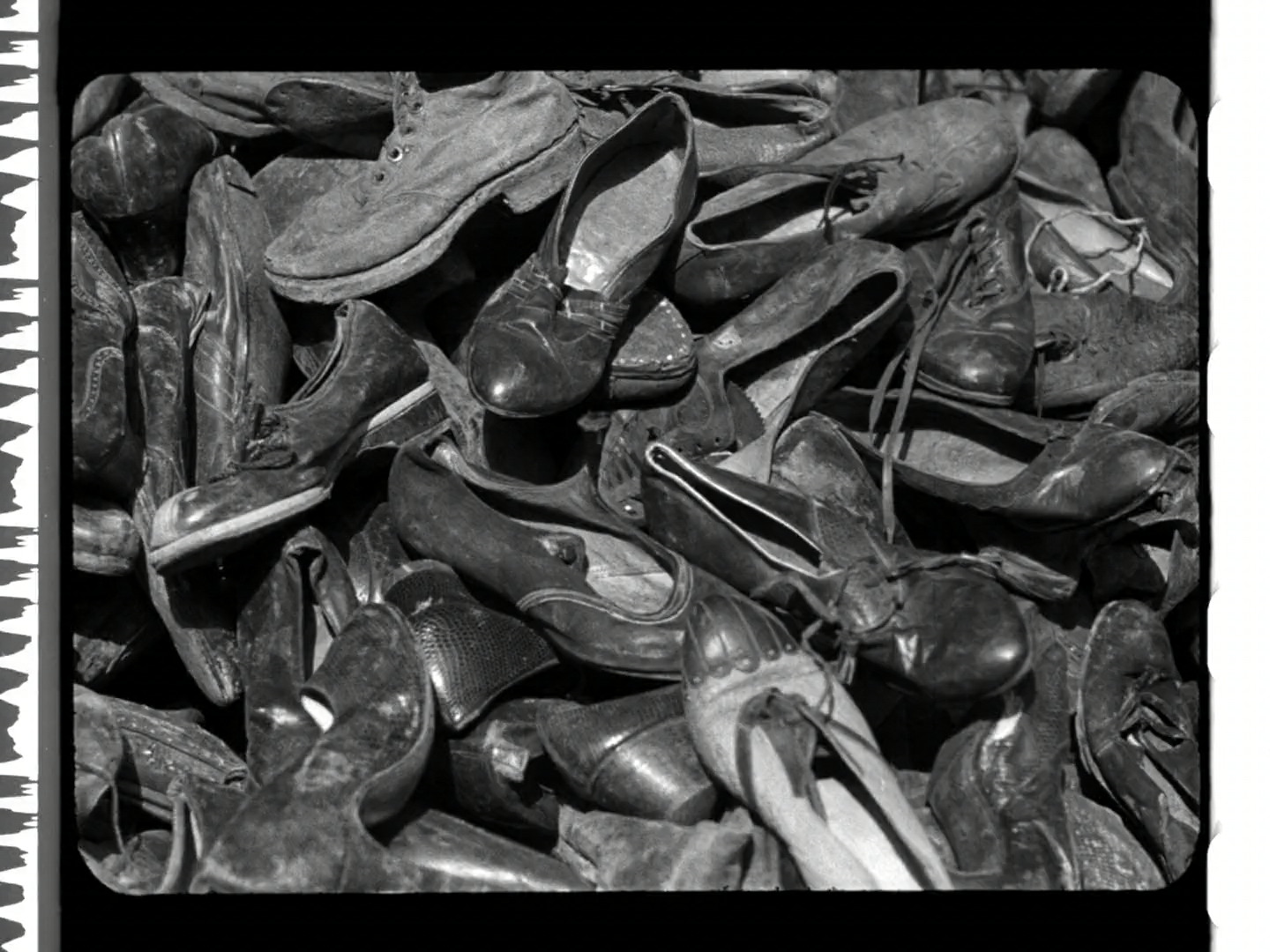

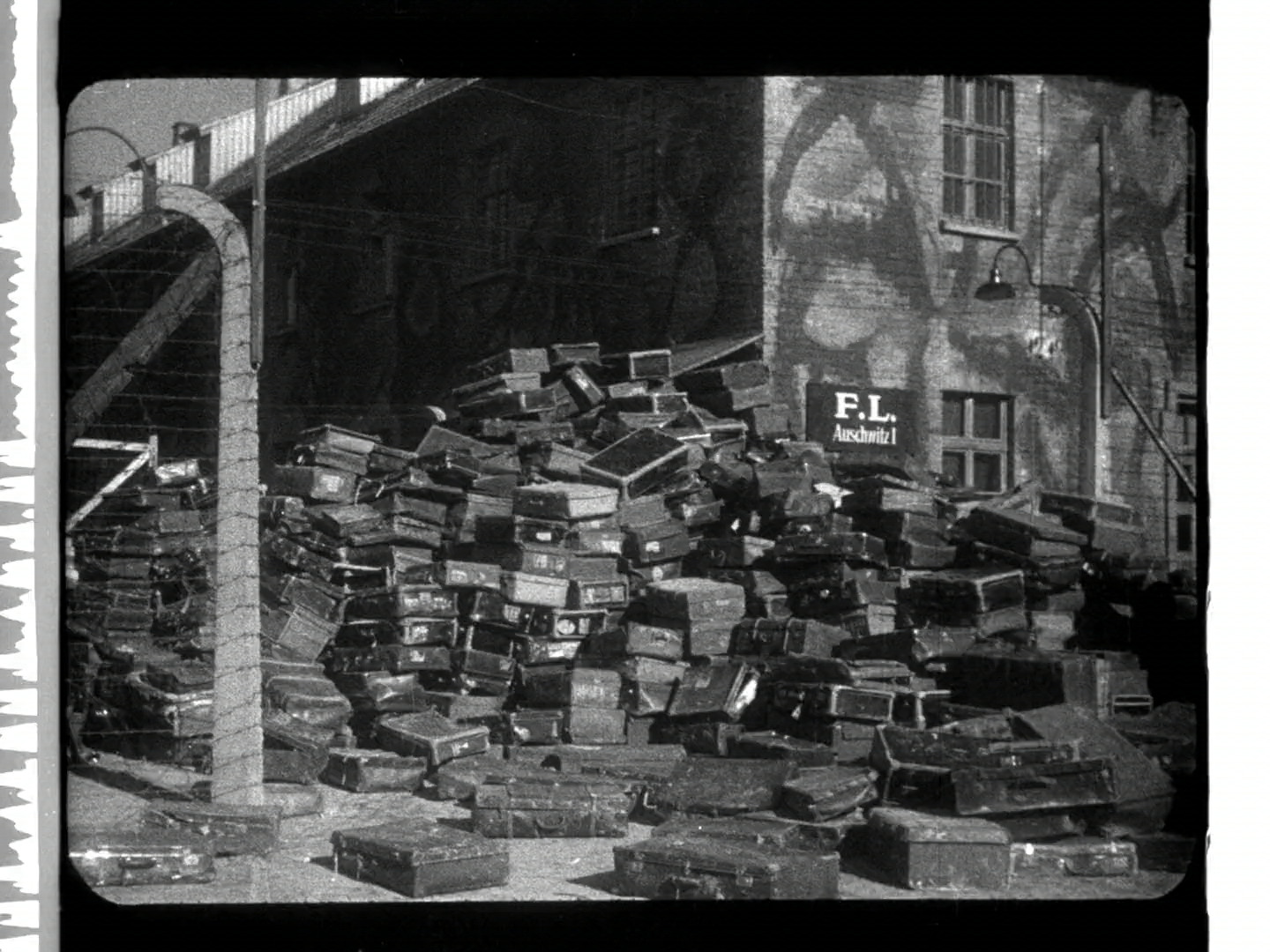

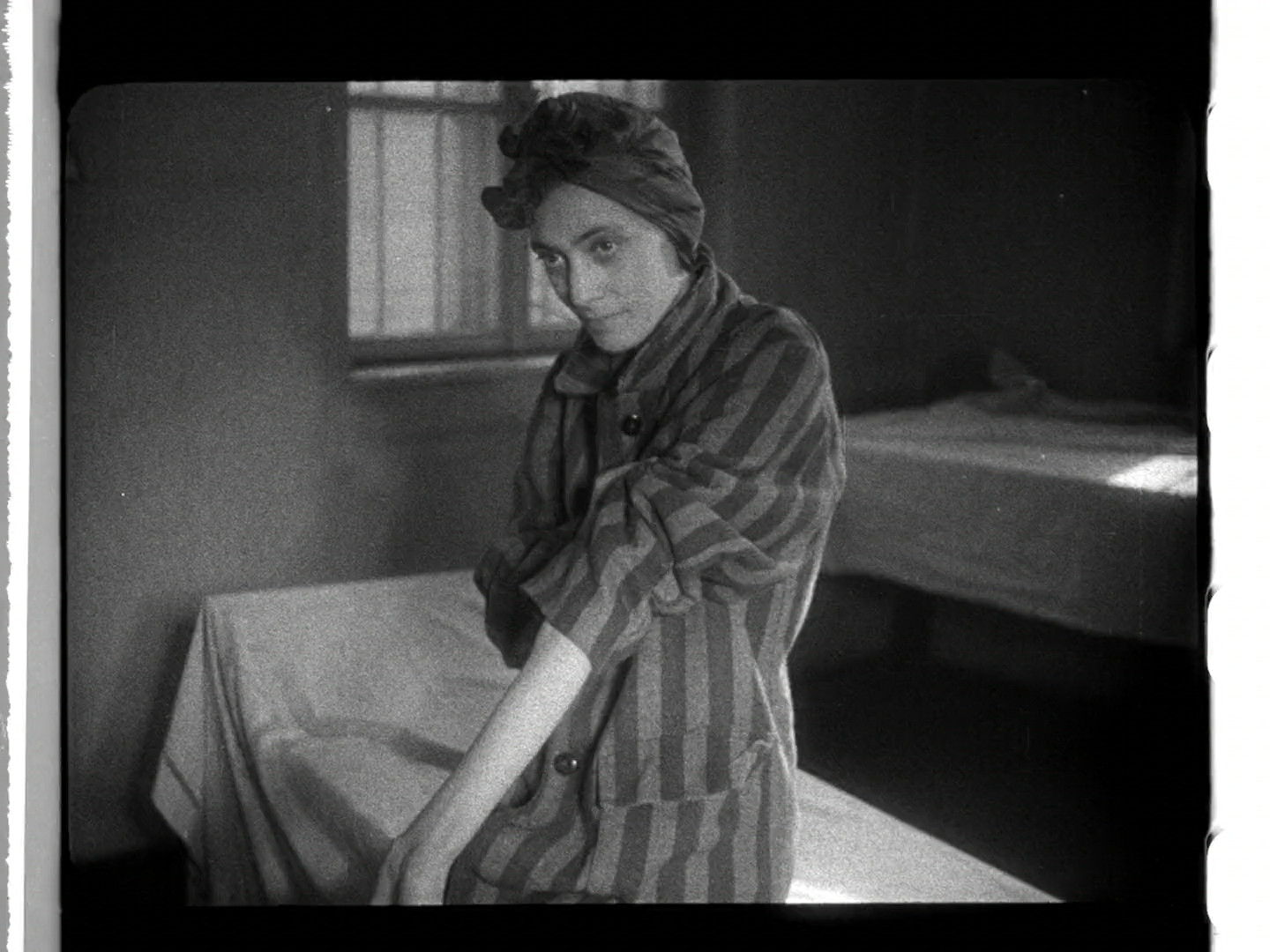
