= Persilschein =

German idiom

Persilschein is a German idiom and literally means "Persil ticket" ("Persil" refers to a brand of laundry detergent). To own or have a Persilschein is akin to having "a clean bill of health" and may refer to the granting of a wide-ranging permission or "carte blanche" to pursue a business or a previously morally or legally suspect interest.

== Denazification certificates ==
The term Persilschein dates back to the denazification period in Germany. For a German to be given a Persilschein meant to be given a certificate that they had a clean political past. Suspected Nazi offenders could be exonerated by statements from others, ideally victims or former enemies of the Nazi regime, and thus accepted as having a good reputation.

Colloquially the affected person was said to be "washed clean" of accusations of Nazi sympathies; "cleanliness" in this context meaning "innocent". They were attested as having a so-called "white vest" (innocence) and were now allowed to apply for a house or open a business again. During 1948, the interest of the Americans in systematic denazification waned markedly as the Cold War and the threat from the Soviet bloc hove increasingly into view. Faster processes were introduced to bring denazification to a swift conclusion, however, that led to questionable judgements.

== Bibliography ==
- Ernst Klee: Persilscheine und falsche Pässe. Wie die Kirchen den Nazis halfen. Fischer-Taschenbuch-Verlag, Frankfurt am Main 1992, ISBN 3-596-10956-6 (Fischer-Taschenbücher 10956 Geschichte).
- Jan Zweyer: Persilschein. Grafit Verlag, Dortmund 2011, ISBN 978-3-89425-615-9.
