= Zweyer =

Zweyer is a German surname. It may refer to the following people:

- Jan Zweyer, German author
- Zweyer von Evenbach, Barons in the Countship Hauenstein
- Zweyer von Unteralpfen, feudal Lords in the Countship Hauenstein
- General Zweyer of Uri, fictional character from the novel Addrich im Moos by Heinrich Zschokke
