= Kenan Kutub-zade =

Soviet Crimean Tatar camera operator who filmed Auschwitz death camp (1906–1981)

- Born: 13 August 1906; Constantinople, Ottoman Empire
- Died: 22 February 1981 (aged 74); Rostov-on-Don, USSR
- Citizenship: Ottoman Empire→ Russian Empire→ Soviet Union
- Awards: Order of the Patriotic War; Order of the Red Star

Kenan Abdureimovich Kutub-zade (Russian: Кенан Абдуреимович Кутуб-заде; 13 August 1906 – 22 February 1981) was a Crimean Tatar camera operator and war correspondent in the Red Army during World War II. He was the main camera operator for the film "Auschwitz Death Camp" and one of the first Soviet photojournalists to enter the camp after Nazi troops were forced out. His film of Holocaust atrocities was presented at the Nuremberg trials.

Shortly after his birth in Constantinople his family moved to Bakhchisaray, where he grew up. In 1920 he entered the printing school of the Bakhchisaray Art and Industrial College, which in graduated from in 1925 as a printing technician. He was then sent to work for the Yalta District Komsomol Committee, and in 1927 he became an assistant camera operator at the Yalta film studio, where he worked until transferring to a studio in Moscow in 1932. In 1938 he became a cameraman for the Moscow newsreel studio, and the next year he was accepted into the Communist party. After the German invasion of the Soviet Union, he was deployed to the front in 1942 as a cameraman in the political department on the 1st Ukrainian Front, seeing combat in a variety of battles, including the Bukrinsky, Kiev, Zhytomyr-Berdichev, Korsun-Shevchenkovsky, Poland, and Berlin operations. During the fighting in the Carpathians he was wounded in combat but returned to the front before recovering. In February 1945 he and his colleagues, including Aleksandr Vorontsov, Mikhail Oshurkov, and Nikolai Bykov entered Auschwitz and filmed what they saw. The footage was used for the Soviet propaganda film Oświęcim (1945). After the war he continued to film throughout the Soviet Union, being able to travel throughout the country since he was able to avoid being designated as a "special settler". He lived in Riga and then Central Asia before eventually settling in Rostov, where he trained many other camera operators. His son Ismet from his first marriage, born in 1933, followed in his footsteps and also became a cameraman, while his second son Timur became a geologist.
