= KZ-Transport 1945 Memorial =

Coordinates: 48°41′46″N 13°18′58″E

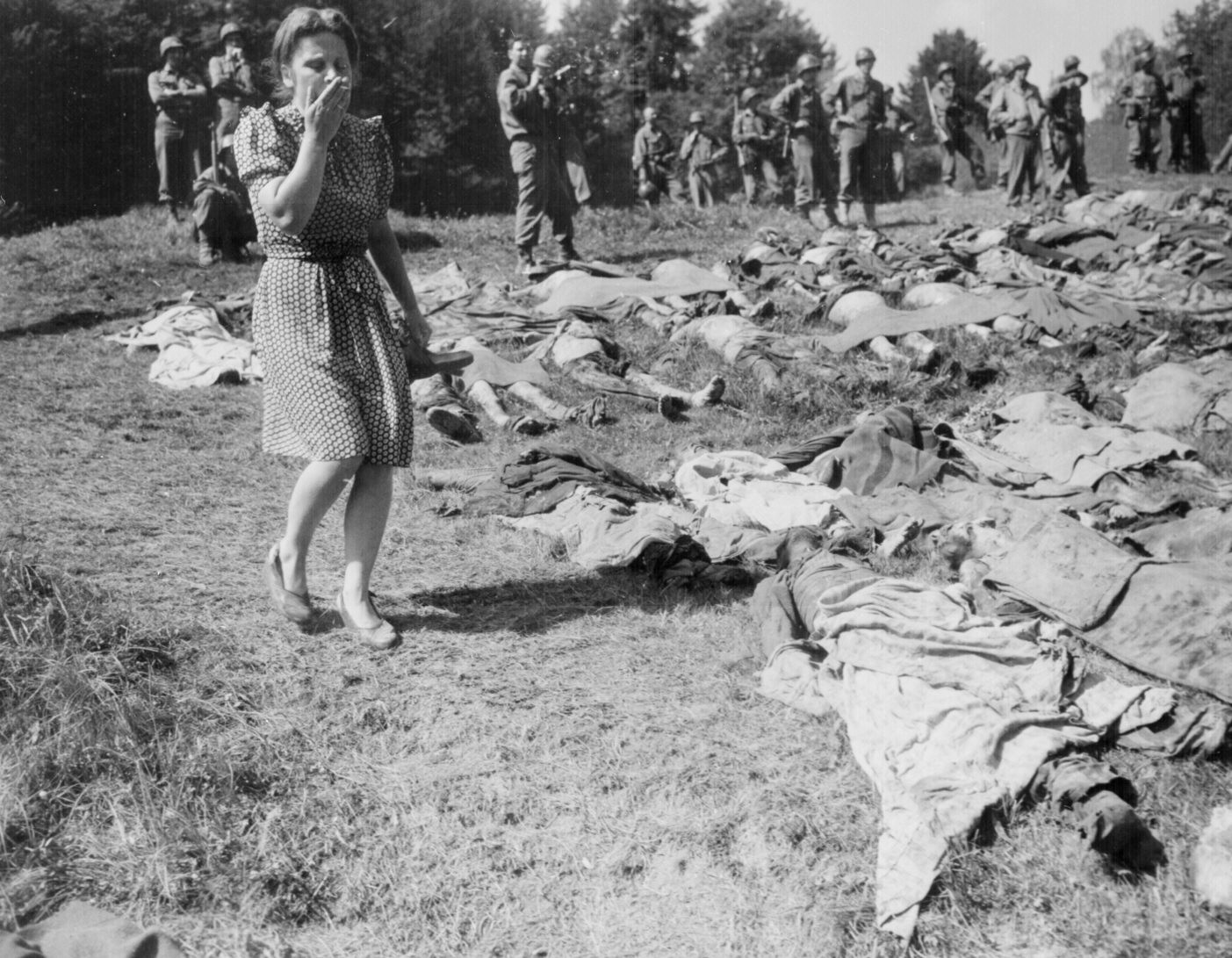
German woman reacts to death march victims in Nammering

The KZ-Transport 1945 Memorial is located in Nammering, Föhrenweg - a district of the Lower Bavarian community of Fürstenstein in the district of Passau, Germany. It was erected in 1984 to commemorate the victims of various nationalities of the Buchenwald evacuation trains.

Coming from the Buchenwald concentration camp, a train with 54 freight cars arrived at Nammering station on 19 April 1945 after a twelve-day journey. During the five-day stay, 794 prisoners lost their lives here. They had been starved to death, killed or shot.

On 24 April, the train continued its journey through Passau, Pocking, and Munich to Dachau. Only 816 people arrived there alive and 2,310 dead were counted on the train at the Dachau concentration camp.

Here in Nammering, the 270 prisoners who had already died during the transport were burnt in a quarry and the other 524 murdered were buried in a swamp meadow (Totenwiese). After the liberation of Germany by the Americans, the mass grave was only discovered three weeks later. The Americans ordered the half-rotten corpses to be excavated and laid out in rows on the meadow of the dead.

Then the entire population had to pass by the dead. Each body had its own coffin and the victims were buried in five cemeteries in the surrounding area. In 1958 three cemeteries were exhumed, brought to Flossenbürg and dissolved, 171 murdered people still lie in Eging and in Fürstenstein 39 dead are still buried.

The KZ-Transport 1945 Memorial was erected about 300 meters east of state road 2127 at the place where the transport came to a halt in 1945 for five days. On 24 April 2005, on the 60th anniversary of the murder of 794 prisoners, a commemoration ceremony was held at the described railway site in Nammering in the presence of survivors of the evacuation train, members of the German Bundestag, the Bavarian Landtag, the Bavarian State Government, representatives of the churches and local politics, and the population for the "greatest [...] terrible war crime in Lower Bavaria".

At a commemoration ceremony on 19 April 2015, on the 70th anniversary of the transport, IG Metall also erected another memorial stone for the murdered trade union members of the train. Since then, the Arbeitskreis KZ-Transport 1945 has presented a permanent exhibition of the events of 1945 along the Danube-Ilz Biking Route.

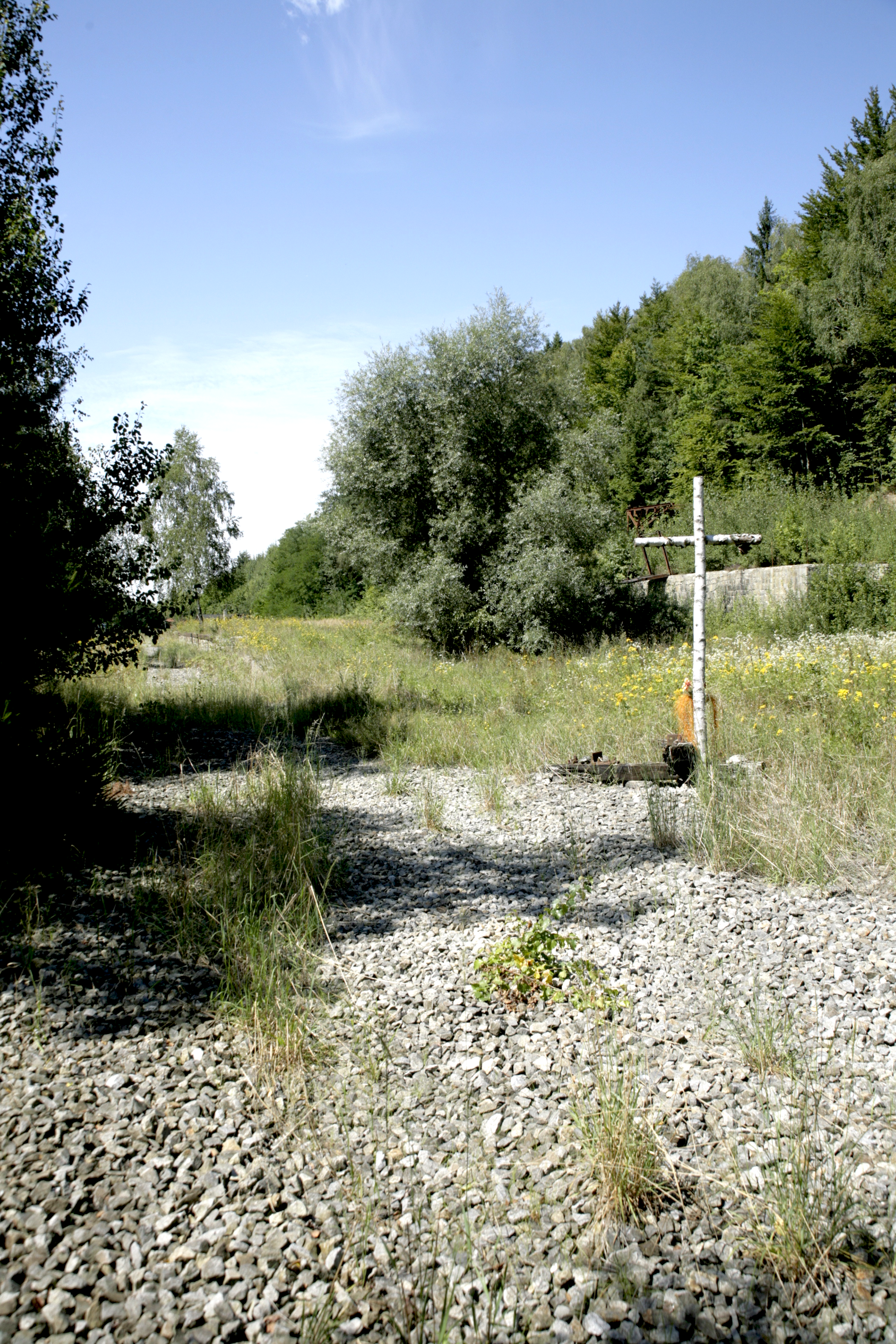
The former railway area near Nammering

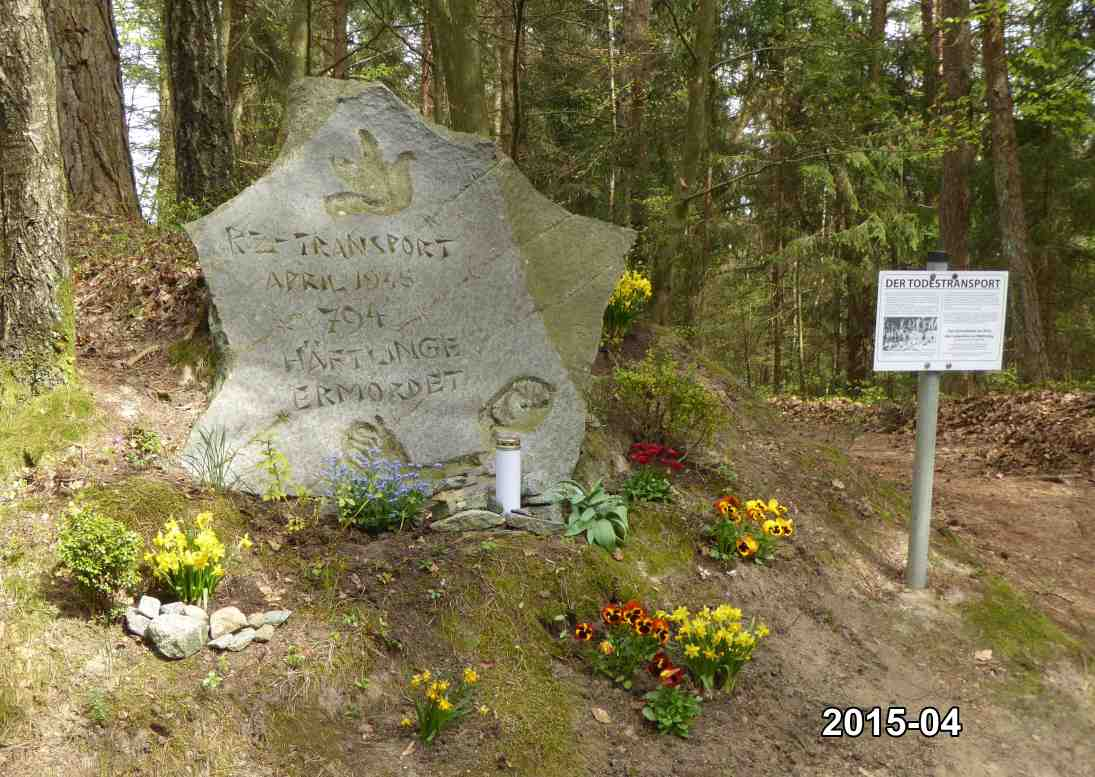
Memorial from 1984- located in the forest

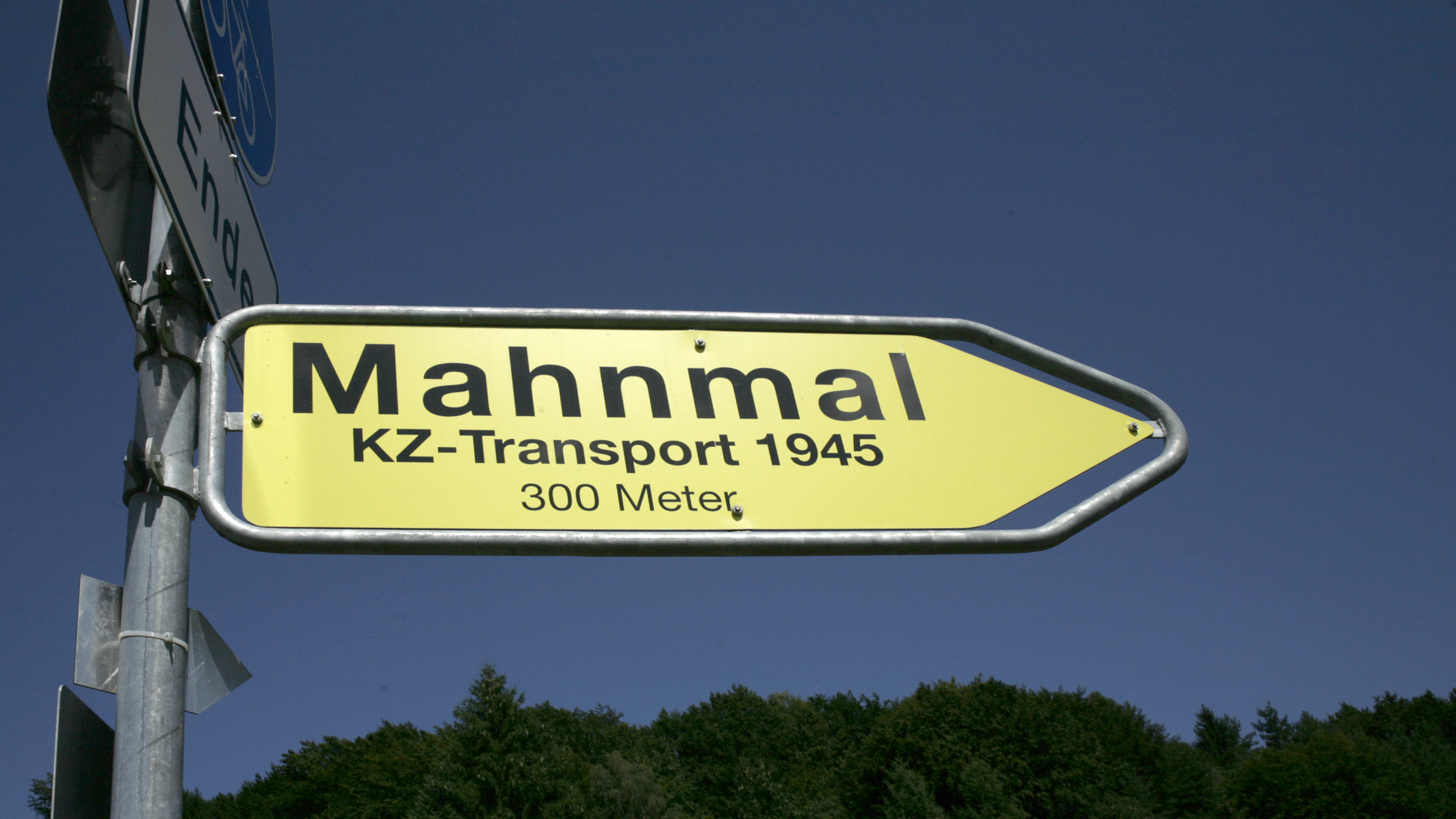
Signpost to the memorial

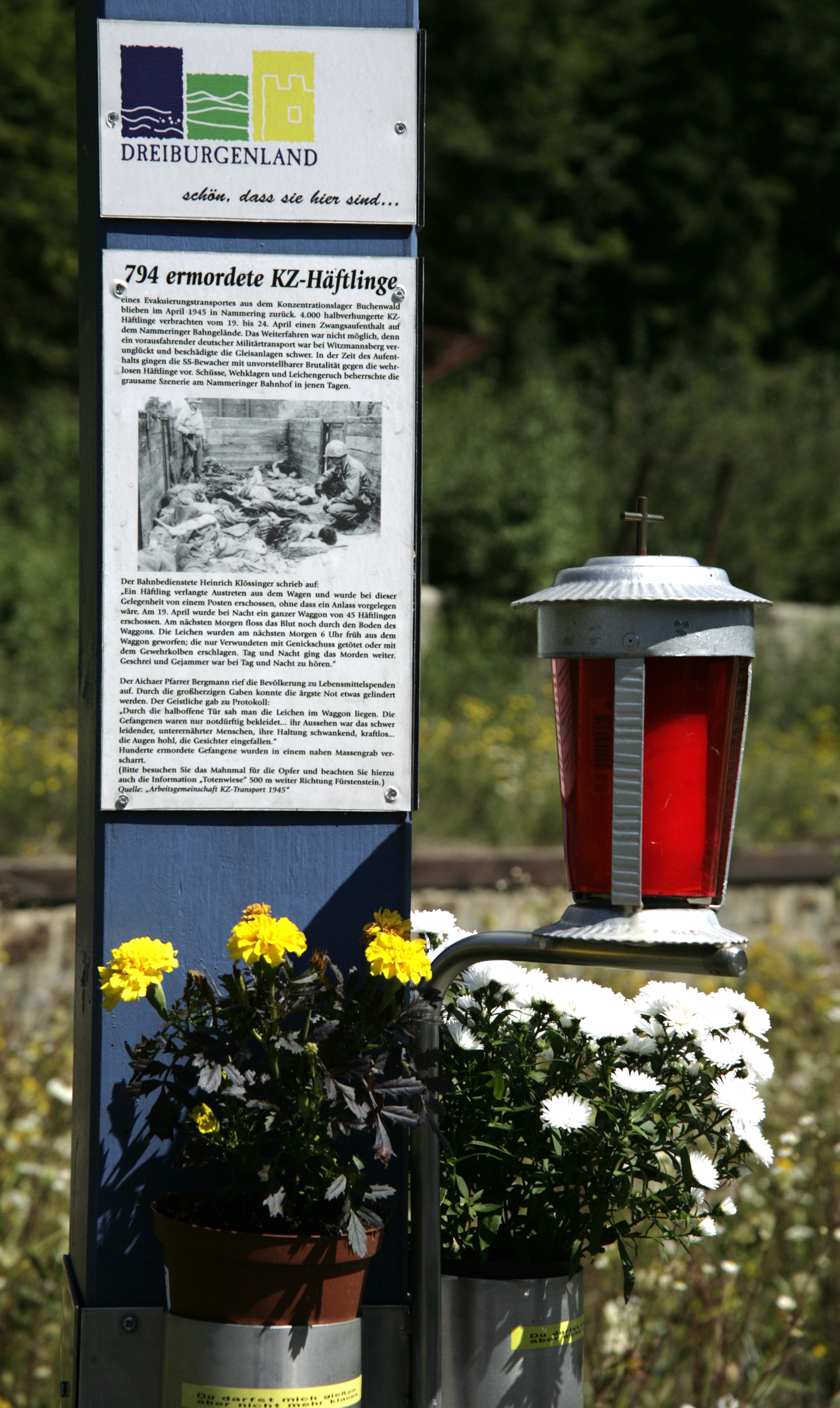
Information board to the memorial

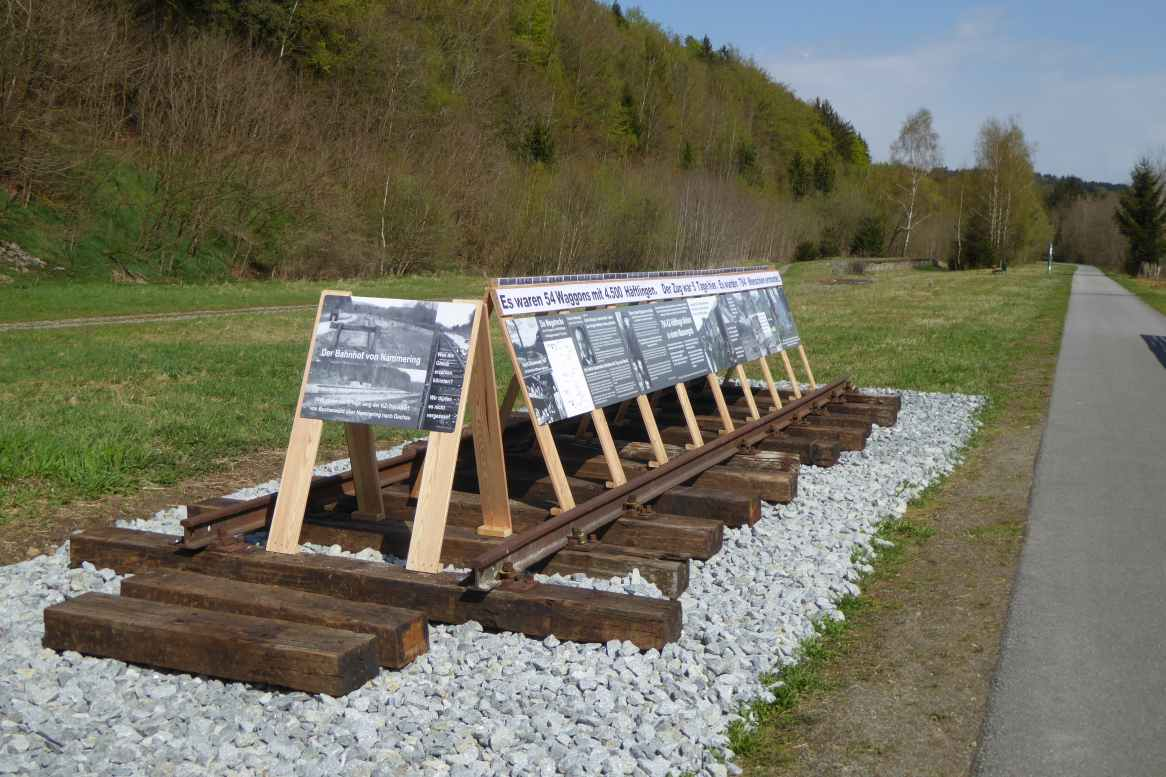
The track should tell and indicate that there was a train station here, today a bicycle path
