= Welt im Film No. 5 =

1945 newsreel

Welt im Film No. 5 was a newsreel meant to acquaint the German and Austrian public with what had taken place in the concentration camps, as part of the Denazification effort.

Welt im Film newsreels were co-productions by the military governments Control Commission for Germany - British Element (CCG/BE) and the Office of Military Government, United States (OMGUS) in Allied-occupied Germany after World War II. Screenings were compulsory.

== See also ==
- Death Mills
- List of Allied propaganda films of World War II
- List of Holocaust films
- The Nuremberg Trials - Soviet film about the Nuremberg trials
- That Justice Be Done - American film about the Nuremberg trials
