= Jan Zweyer =

German writer (born 1953)

Jan Zweyer (born December 12, 1953, in Frankfurt (Main))) is a German writer. Jan Zweyer is only his pen name. His real name is Rüdiger Richartz.

== Career ==
He first graduated in architecture and then in social sciences and worked as scientific clerk. After that he worked as a freelance journalist. He has been working for an international industrial company for several years and only writes in his leisure. Zweyer writes detective stories which deal in the Ruhr and are very popular in Northrhine-Westphalia because of its naturalistic descriptions.

== Novels ==
- 1998 Glück auf. Glück ab ISBN 978-3-89425-212-0. OCLC 75944757.
- 1999 Alte Genossen ISBN 978-3-89425-221-2. OCLC 42217666.
- 1999 Siebte Sohle, Querschlag West ISBN 978-3-89425-230-4. OCLC 76017269.
- 1999 Tödliches Abseits ISBN 978-3-89425-234-2. OCLC 62321788.
- 2000 Georgs Geheimnis ISBN 978-3-89425-242-7. OCLC 62514546.
- 2001 Tatort Töwerland ISBN 978-3-89425-253-3. OCLC 67182481.
- 2002 Glänzender Tod ISBN 978-3-89425-263-2. OCLC 76404441.
- 2004 Verkauftes Sterben ISBN 978-3-89425-289-2. OCLC 70914823.
- 2005 Als der Himmel verschwand ISBN 978-3-89425-313-4. OCLC 76753742.
- 2007 Franzosenliebchen, Grafit Verlag, ISBN 978-3-89425-605-0. OCLC .
- 2009 Goldfasan, Grafit Verlag, ISBN 978-3-89425-611-1 OCLC 458745084.
- 2011 Persilschein, Grafit Verlag, ISBN 978-3-89425-615-9. OCLC 725281952.

== Short stories ==
- 2002 Nur wir allein
- 2002 Das Skelett von Königsborn
- 2004 Mit Walther in Aldekerk
- 2004 Margarethe
- 2006 Goleo, Pille, Pils und Schalke
- 2006 Die lieben Kleinen
- 2008 Langes Wochenende
- 2008 Zappels Plan
- 2009 Knapp vorbei ist auch daneben
- 2009 Ausverkauf

== Private life ==
He lives in Herne in the Ruhr with his wife and his dog.
