= Brian Moser =

British documentary filmmaker

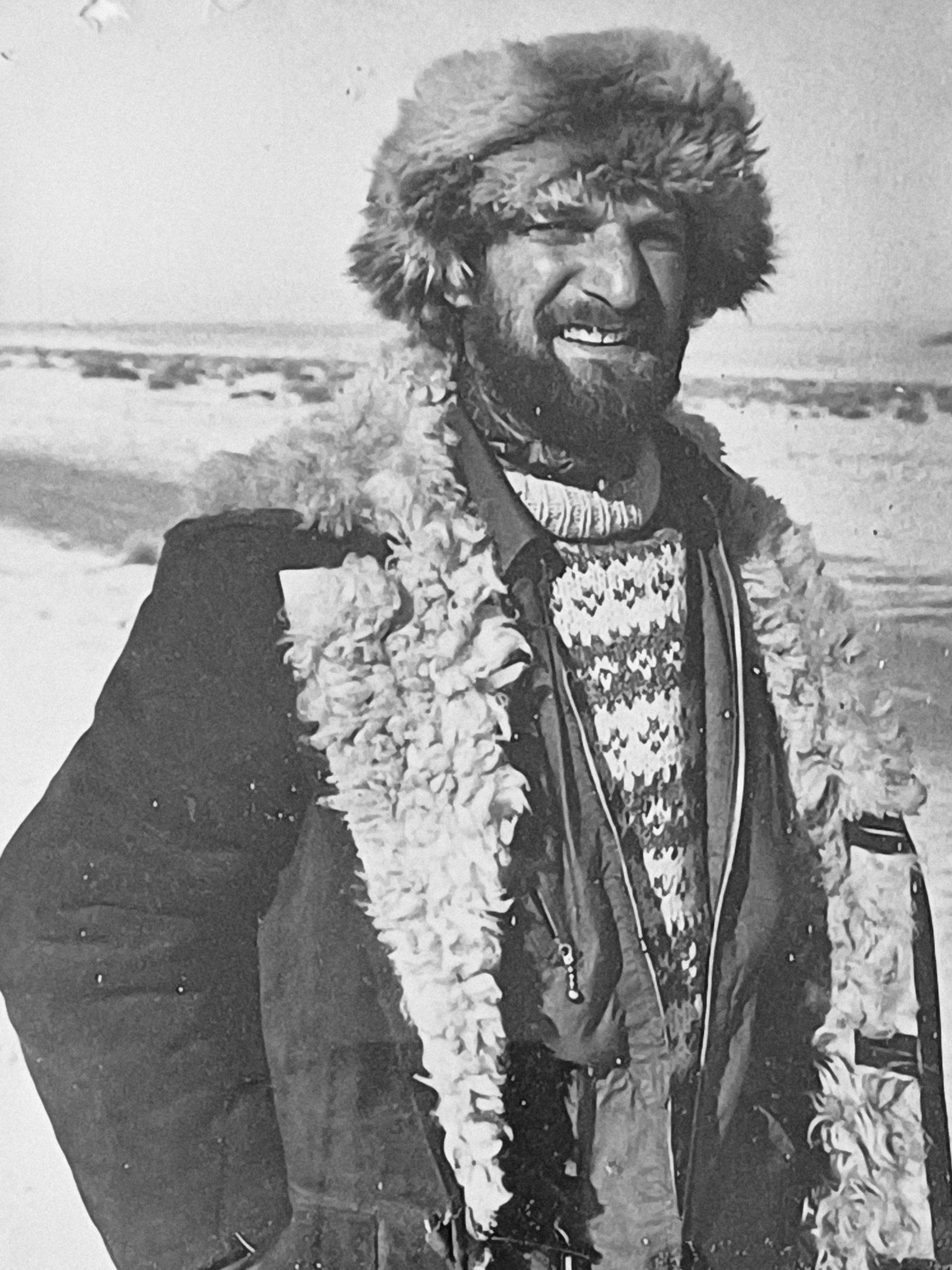
Brian Moser in Mongolia in 1974

Brian John Moser (30 January 1935 – 16 February 2023) was a British documentary filmmaker who made approx. 40 films between 1963 and 1998, including a television series called Disappearing World for Granada Television. This BAFTA-winning series, which began in 1970 and ran for more than 20 years, told the stories of indigenous peoples under threat from the advance of the outside world, in their own words. Moser was also a documentary-maker for World in Action, a long-running Granada TV current affairs programmes, with his most notable contribution to the series coming with the death of Che Guevara.

== Early life and education ==
Born in London in 1935, the son of Charles (Charlie) Moser, from a family of Bradford wool merchants of German Jewish descent, and his wife, Eliza (née Henderson), a British artist whose family ran an import-export business in Chile. Moser attended school at Glenalmond College, Perth, and completed National Service in the Middle East with the Royal Engineers before gaining a degree in geology from Trinity College, Cambridge. His work as a geologist took place in Colombia and Patagonia, with a spell in Nyasaland before it gained independence as Malawi.

== Career ==
=== Expeditions to Colombia and initial film making ===
In 1960-61, he spent two years in Colombia with the anthropologist Donald Tayler, recording the music of eight remote indigenous tribes, the beginning of his enduring fascination with South America, and particularly Colombia. The music was the focus of three short films that they made together, and these were later edited into the documentary Piraparaná. This film caught the attention of the Granada TV programme controller Denis Forman, who decided to invest in the amateur filmmaker, providing training and then hiring him to work as a researcher, then producer, on The World Tomorrow, and as a producer and director of World in Action.

=== Che Guevara photographs and film ===
In October 1967, when the body of the Che Guevara was brought out of the Bolivian jungle lashed to a helicopter, Moser was the first photographer on hand in Vallegrande to take pictures of Latin America's most famous revolutionary leader. At the time, he was in Bolivia preparing to make a film about Guevara who was operating there, in the hope of spreading the Cuban Revolution to mainland Latin America.

When given the news in Santa Cruz de la Sierra that Guevara and his guerrillas were surrounded in the Bolivian jungle, Moser cabled Granada Television in Manchester and asked for a film crew to be sent over urgently. He then received a tip-off from a US marine that Guevara had been "shot and captured", and he hired a Jeep to drive 200 km through the night to Vallegrande, a small colonial town in the foothills of the Andes at the centre of counter-guerrilla operations.

Guevara's body was flown out of the jungle and held in the village of La Higuera. Eventually, it arrived in Vallegrande, strapped to the stretcher on the rail of a helicopter, and was put on show by the Bolivian military in a hospital laundry hut. Still with no crew, Moser used his still camera to shoot the first photographs of Guevara taken after the revolutionary's death. The chilling images contrasted with those presented to the world by the Bolivian authorities the following day, after Guevara was cleaned up to look like a saintly figure of legend.

As The Guardian journalist Richard Gott who accompanied Moser on the trip to Vallegrande said, "Moser had a tape recorder with him, and he had the wit to describe and record what he saw in front of him: the body of the dead guerrilla leader stretched out in the laundry hut, the crowd of peasants and military officers, and the nursing nuns from the hospital. His hoarse and excited commentary, coupled with his still photos, formed the dramatic introduction to the film he made a few weeks later". The subsequent World in Action film, The End of a Revolution? reported that contrary to the Bolivian authorities' claim that Guevara had died of his wounds after being "shot and captured", he had actually been killed 24 hours after he was apprehended.

=== Disappearing World series ===
In 1969, encouraged by his wife at the time, Caroline, an anthropologist, Moser wrote a synopsis for a proposed series that he titled The Vanishing Tribes of Latin America. It was accepted by Denis Forman, the head of Granada Television, and, David Plowright, its programme controller, though Forman proposed to call it Disappearing World. The three agreed that the films would not resemble travelogues and that the people featured would speak for themselves wherever possible, with subtitles.

Disappearing World became a landmark anthropological series offering intimate portraits of remote communities, like the Cuiva, Embera and Panare of South America, the nomadic Tuareg of the Sahara, the Kurdish Dervishes and the Meo of Laos. Each episode was filmed on 16mm film, usually taking about four weeks. A three-month edit in the Granada studios in Manchester followed.

Moser was series editor from 1970 until 1977 and directed five episodes himself. His first, The Last of the Cuiva, in 1971, working with the anthropologist Bernard Arcand was filmed about a nomadic Colombian tribe that had barely been touched by contemporary society. Others provided insights into the Meo people of Laos (1972), where warfare was leading to the virtual destruction of the entire tribal community, and the Qaderi dervishes of Iranian Kurdistan, an Islamic order of Sunni Kurds with bizarre rituals (1973). Another two made by Moser with the Disappearing World team and the veteran anthropologist Owen Lattimore on the Khalkha of Mongolia, were screened in 1975, but – at the request of the Mongolian government – not under the series title.

Moser and Charlie Nairn were the producer/directors for the first eight programmes. Later on the filmmakers included Andre Singer, Leslie Woodhead, Michael Grigsby and Hugh Brody amongst others. The films looked at communities under threat right across South and North America, Africa, Asia, the Middle East and Europe.

=== Frontier series ===
In 1977–78, while still on the Granada staff, Moser spent eight months with his wife Caroline, plus their two young sons Titus and Nat, living in a bamboo hut built above a swamp in a slum community in Guayaquil, Ecuador. Together, they made the film People of the Barrio there, broadcast in 1981 on ATV (later Central Television). Moser having resigned from Granada in 1978 following a dispute with the then-powerful in-house technicians' union, which objected to his frequent employment of small freelance crews.

This became the first episode of a trilogy in a new series Frontier exploring the lives of people living on the edge of society. In a second Frontier trilogy, for Central Independent Television, in 1983, Moser followed the trail of cocaine production from Colombia and Bolivia to its consumption in Florida.

=== Before Columbus series and later works ===
Following the Frontier series, Moser made The Search for Mengele (1985), after the discovery of the Auschwitz doctor's remains in Brazil. He traced Josef Mengele's flight from justice and interviewed those who had known the so-called "Angel of Death".

He then embarked upon Before Columbus, a three-part series about the Indigenous peoples of the Americas, broadcast in 1992 to mark the 500th anniversary the previous year of the supposed "discovery" of the "New World".

Later films included Fire of Kali, broadcast in the BBC Everyman series in 1997, film followed Sri Lankan Tamils as they turned to traditional oracles in the hope of tracing family members who had "disappeared" during the then still raging civil war.

In 2016, Moser then aged eighty-one returned to the Colombian Amazon to take copies of films he had made there, along with photographs and audio recordings. Accompanied by his son Titus and the anthropologists Christine and Stephen Hugh-Jones, who had worked with him on the Disappearing World film War of the Gods, he was reunited with Ignacio Valencia, a Macuna shaman whom he had met while filming Piraparaná fifty-five years previously. Titus made a film called Ignacio's Legacy about the trip and their reencounter.

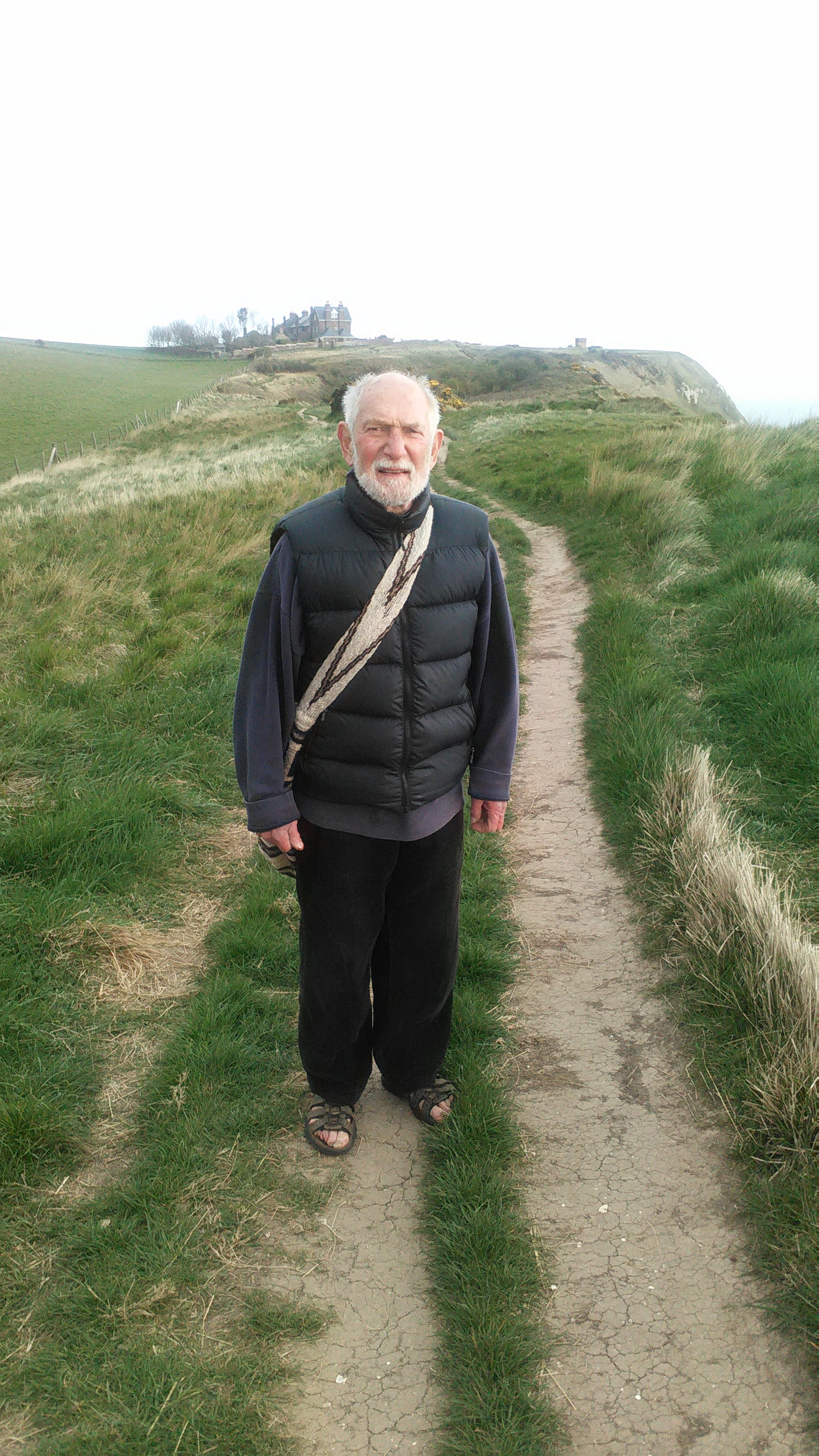
Brian Moser in Dorset in 2015

His last few years were spent living in a cottage in Dorset, organising his substantial collection of photos into a book Frontier People with the help of Titus.

== Personal life ==
In 1967 Moser married the anthropologist Caroline Shephard, and they spent several years in Latin America, where together they developed the idea of the Disappearing World films. Fifteen years and two children (Titus and Nat) later, the couple divorced. In 1988, Moser married the Colombian soprano and opera singer Marina Tafur, with whom he had two stepchildren, Juanita and Sandra.

== Awards and honours ==
1975: British Academy of Film and Television Arts (BAFTA) awarded to Brian Moser for Disappearing World in the category Best Factual Series.

Paul Henley a Professor of Social Anthropology at the University of Manchester wrote that, from the late 1960s, through his work as a television producer-director, Moser was a key figure in the development of a distinctively British ethnographic film format.

As a result of his work recording and documenting indigenous peoples, he was made an honorary citizen of Colombia. Many of his sound recordings and photos are held there, while others are at the Pitt-Rivers Museum in Oxford and at the British Museum.

== Filmography ==
=== Films directed/produced by Brian Moser ===
- 1963: Piraparaná
- 1963: Bronchitis (World in Action)
- 1964: Palomares (World in Action)
- 1966: State of Emergency (World in Action)
- 1966: Black Power (The World Tomorrow)
- 1966: Lesotho – Black Oasis (The World Tomorrow)
- 1967: Bolivia -The End of a Revolution? (World in Action)
- 1967: A New Kind of Match (The World Tomorrow)
- 1968: Cuba – One Way to Change the World (World in Action)
- 1968: Wake Up and Work Together (World in Action)
- 1968: Take it Easy (World in Action)
- 1970: Peru – An Act of God (World in Action)
- 1971: The Last of the Cuiva (Disappearing World)
- 1971: Embera – The End of the Road (Disappearing World)
- 1971: War of the Gods (Disappearing World)
- 1972: Vietnam -The Siege of Kontum (World in Action)
- 1972: The Meo (Disappearing World)
- 1973: Dervishes of Kurdistan (Disappearing World)
- 1975: Mongolia – On the Edge of the Gobi (Disappearing World)
- 1975: Mongolia – The City on the Steppes (Disappearing World)
- 1981: People of the Barrio (Frontier)
- 1981: Emerald Miners of Muzo (Frontier)
- 1981: Ranchers of the Sierra (Frontier)
- 1983: Colombia – A Small Family Business (Frontier)
- 1983: Bolivia – God Gave Us the Leaf (Frontier)
- 1983: USA – Here's $20 Stick It Up Your Nose (Frontier)
- 1985: The Search for Mengele
- 1988: In Search of the Assassin (Assignment)
- 1990: Lines of Blood (Viewpoint)
- 1992: Invasion (Before Columbus)
- 1992: Conversion (Before Columbus)
- 1992: Rebellion (Before Columbus)
- 1993: My Homeland, Your Homeland (Assignment)
- 1994/1995: The Loved Ones
- 1995: The Shame of Cromwell Street (Dispatches)
- 1995: A Mission for Martyrs (Dispatches)
- 1997: The Fire of Kali (Everyman)
- 1998: Backyard 1954–1990 (Cold War)
- 1998: The Long Weekend

=== Films about Brian Moser ===
- 1983: A South American Journey
- 2016: Ignacio's Legacy
- 2025: Mucker

== Books ==
Brian Moser and Donald Tayler, The Cocaine Eaters, Longmans, Green & Co, London, 1965
