= Claudia Milne =

British documentary filmmaker

Claudia Milne is a British documentary filmmaker and independent tv producer, specialising in investigative journalism.

== Early career ==
Milne joined Granada Television in 1969 as a researcher on Nice Time, a light entertainment show, produced by John Birt and starring Kenny Everett and Germaine Greer. In 1970, Milne joined World In Action, and spent seven years on the programme before being made series producer of Granada Reports. She became a freelance producer/director in 1979, making For God's Sake Care for ATV, an investigation into how the Salvation Army spent only 14 per cent of its income on British charitable causes such as helping homeless men, Sex Drugs and the Vicar, an exposé of the journalism of the News of the World for BBC 2's 40 Minutes strand, and Asante Market Women, a film for Granada's Disappearing World series which won the Blue Ribbon Award at the American Film Festival.

== Twenty Twenty Television ==
In 1982, Milne formed an independent production company with Lyn Gambles and produced 40 editions of 20/20 Vision, Channel 4's first flagship current affairs strand, from which Twenty Twenty evolved. She co-founded the company with her husband Mike Whittaker. Milne and Whittaker focussed on producing investigative documentaries for British broadcasters and under their leadership, Twenty Twenty became the UK's largest supplier of independently produced long-running current affairs shows, making series for ITV and Channel 5 as well as producing many editions of Dispatches for Channel 4.

In 1985, Milne produced (with Geoffrey Seed) MI5's Official Secrets, based on whistle-blowing testimony from former MI5 officer Cathy Massiter, who revealed how the Security Service was monitoring the activities of the Campaign for Nuclear Disarmament. The former Director General of the Security Service, Dame Stella Rimington, described in her autobiography how the film came as "a massive shock to everyone in MI5". Milne also produced Island of Outcasts, a film for Channel 4's Cutting Edge, on the inhumane conditions suffered by Greek mental patients incarcerated on the island of Leros; the film won the 1990 RTS journalism award for best International Current Affairs programme.

In her 1991 film, A Special Hospital, Milne led an investigation into the abuse of British mental patients detained at Ashworth Hospital, which prompted a government inquiry chaired by Louis Blom-Cooper. Between 1993 and 1995, Milne was the Executive Producer of The Big Story, a peak-time, award-winning 25-minute weekly current affairs series, for the ITV Network. In 1995, she also produced The War Crimes File, which won a Special Commendation for International Current Affairs at the 1995 RTS Journalism Awards.

== Series ==
Milne was responsible for many notable history series, including The Boer War, as well as Canterbury Tales, a history of the Church of England in the 20th Century, School Rules, a history of education since 1870 and Pennies from Bevan, a history of the NHS (all presented by Ian Hislop) and A Family Century, a critically acclaimed series documenting the 20th century through the experiences of a single family.

Milne was also the executive producer of popular factual series such as Bad Lads Army for ITV, which won the Royal Television Society's Best Feature Award in 2003, and That'll Teach Them for Channel 4, which won the Indie Award for Best Reality Series in 2005. Meanwhile she continued to executive produce investigations for Dispatches on Channel 4, including MMR, What they Didn't Tell You, presented and reported by award-winning Sunday Times investigative journalist Brian Deer. Broadcast in 2004, the documentary revealed for the first time on television that Dr Andrew Wakefield, the now-discredited medical researcher behind the MMR scare, had applied for patents on a vaccine that was a rival of the MMR vaccine, and that he knew of test results from his own laboratory that contradicted his claims. It was described by the British Medical Journal as "one of the most exciting examples of investigative television journalism you will ever see."

In 2005, Milne was executive producer for Torture: The Guantanamo Guidebook, described by Mark Lawson in The Guardian as "impeccable journalism". In 2007, Twenty Twenty was bought by Shed Media.
