= World in Action =

British investigative current affairs programme

- 1970s version of the programme's opening title
- Created by: Tim Hewat
- Country of origin: United Kingdom
- Original language: English
- No. of series: 55

Production
- Producer: Granada Television
- Running time: 30 minutes

Original release
- Network: ITV
- Release: 7 January 1963 – 7 December 1998

World in Action is a British investigative current affairs programme made by Granada Television for ITV which was broadcast for 35 years from 7 January 1963 until 7 December 1998. Its campaigning journalism frequently had a major impact on events of the day. Its production teams often took audacious risks, and the programme gained a solid reputation for its often-unorthodox approach. The series was sold around the world and won numerous awards. In its heyday, World in Action drew audiences of up to 23 million in Britain alone, equivalent to almost half the population.

Cabinet ministers fell to its probings. Numerous innocent victims of the British criminal justice system, including the Birmingham Six, were released from jail. Honouring the programme in its 50th anniversary awards the Political Studies Association said, "World in Action thrived on unveiling corruption and highlighting underhand dealings. World in Action came to be seen as hard-hitting investigative journalism at its best." A melodramatic post-trial encounter in 1967 between Mick Jagger and senior British establishment figures, in which the rock star and his retinue were flown by helicopter onto the lawn of a stately home, was engineered by then World in Action researcher and future BBC Director-General John Birt. Decades later, Birt himself described it as "one of the iconic moments of the Sixties." Soon after she became Conservative Party leader, Margaret Thatcher was said to have told the BBC Director-General, Sir Ian Trethowan, that she considered World in Action to consist of "just a lot of Trots. Panorama, however, are bastards."

Its removal after 35 years was seen by some as part of a general dumbing down of British television and of ITV in particular. One commercial TV regulatory official privately characterised the Tonight programme, which replaced it, as merely "fluffy". Others saw World in Action's eventual disappearance as the inevitable consequence of rising commercial pressures. Announcing a £250,000 fund for an investigative journalism training scheme, Channel 4 said in November 2011 that a decline in the pool of investigative journalism had occurred since "the demise of training grounds such as World in Action".

== Origins ==
World in Action was the pre-eminent current-affairs programme produced by Britain's ITV Network in its first 50 years. Along with This Week, Weekend World, TV Eye, First Tuesday, The Big Story, and The Cook Report – and the news-gathering of ITN – World in Action gave ITV a reputation for quality broadcast journalism to rival the BBC's output.

For the first years of its existence, ITV had a near-monopoly of television advertising revenue. Roy Thomson, who ran Scottish Television, famously described ITV as a "licence to print money". In return for this income, the broadcasting regulator insisted that the ITV companies broadcast a proportion of their programmes as public-service TV. Out of this was born the network's reputation for serious current affairs, eagerly grabbed by programme makers under Granada's founder, Lord Bernstein.

Some of the most prominent figures in 20th-century British broadcasting helped to create World in Action, in particular, Tim Hewat, "the maverick genius of Granada's current affairs in its formative years", and David Plowright, but also Jeremy Isaacs, Michael Parkinson, John Birt, and Gus Macdonald and its most long-serving executive producer, Ray Fitzwalter. The series developed the skills of generations of journalists, and in particular, filmmakers. Michael Apted worked on the original Seven Up!. Paul Greengrass, who spent 10 years on World in Action, told the BBC: "My first dream was to work on World In Action, to be honest. It was that wonderful eclectic mixture of filmmaking and reportage. That was my training ground. It showed me the world and made me see many things." He later told The Guardian: "If there's a thread running through my career it's World in Action – the phrase as well as the programme."

Although its rivals produced many memorable programmes, World in Action's "slamming into the subject of each edition without wordy prefaces from a reassuring host-figure" consistently gained a reputation for the kind of original journalism and filmmaking that made headlines and won major awards. In its time, the series was honoured by all of the major broadcasting awards, including many BAFTA, the Royal Television Society, and Emmy awards.

World in Action's style was the opposite to its urbane BBC rivals, especially to the London BBC. By repute, especially in its early days, World in Action would never employ anybody who was on first-name terms with any politician. Gus Macdonald, an executive producer of the programme, said it had been "born brash". Steve Boulton, one of its last editors, wrote in The Independent that the programme's ethos was to "comfort the afflicted – and afflict the comfortable." Paul Greengrass told The Guardian in June 2008 that the chairman of Granada TV once told him: "Don't forget, your job's to make trouble."

The series outlasted all of its contemporaries in ITV current affairs, killed off as the commercial pressures on the network grew with the arrival of multichannel TV in the UK. Eventually, World In Action, too, was removed from the schedules by its own creator, Granada TV. On 7 December 1998, World in Action ended after 35 years on air. It was replaced in the schedules by Tonight.

== Investigative legacy ==
From the beginning, and especially from the late 1960s, World in Action broke new ground in investigative techniques. Landmark investigations included the Poulson affair, corruption in the West Midlands Serious Crime Squad, the exposure of the shadowy and violent far-right group Combat 18, investigations into L. Ron Hubbard and Scientology, and most notably, a long campaign that resulted in the release from prison of the Birmingham Six, six Irishmen falsely accused of planting Provisional Irish Republican Army bombs in Birmingham pubs.

World in Action's appetite for controversy created tension with the Independent Broadcasting Authority (IBA), the official regulator during most of the series's run, which had the power to intervene before broadcast. Sir Denis Forman, one of Granada's founders, wrote that "trench warfare" existed between the programme and the industry regulator, the Independent Television Authority, in the years between 1966 and 1969 as World in Action sought to establish its journalistic freedoms.

The most celebrated dispute was in 1973, over the banning of The Friends and Influence of John L Poulson, the definitive film about the Poulson affair, itself one of the defining scandals of British political life in the 1960s. Poulson was an architect, who was jailed a year later for corrupting politicians and civil servants to advance his construction business. The regulator, which was then the IBA, banned the film without seeing it and without giving official reasons other than "broadcasting policy". As a protest, Granada broadcast a blank screen – which, bizarrely, recorded the third-highest TV audience of that week. After a public furor, which saw newspapers from the Sunday Times to the Socialist Worker unite in condemnation of "censorship", the IBA held a second vote, having by then seen the film. By a single vote, the ban was lifted and the programme, by then retitled The Rise and Fall of John Poulson, was transmitted on 30 April 1973, three months after it was first scheduled.

In January 1980, the programme examined the business practices of the then chairman of Manchester United football club, Louis Edwards. Edwards ran a wholesale butchery business that supplied schools in Manchester; WIA exposed practices of bribery of council officials and the supply of meat that was unfit for human consumption to such institutions; Edwards' businesses were subsequently prosecuted and lost their contracts. Louis Edwards himself died of a heart attack a month after the show was broadcast.

World in Action tackled the British intelligence services, as well as the Royal Navy, over their recruitment practices; senior navy personnel famously door-stepped the director of World in Action's film in question. The programme broadcast revelations by whistleblowers from both GCHQ, the government's electronic eavesdropping and surveillance headquarters, and from the Joint Intelligence Committee.

Its most audacious investigation of the intelligence community was, perhaps, an extended edition in July 1984 titled "The Spy Who Never Was", the confessions of a former MI5 officer, Peter Wright. Spycatcher, Wright's subsequent account of the period when his colleagues and he had, as he put it, "bugged and burgled our way across London", revealed what had in effect been a planned coup against the then-Labour government of Harold Wilson. Wright appeared to have been in charge of the technical side of things. "The Wilson plot", as it became known, was corroborated to varying degrees both before and after the film's transmission in various other books by journalists and in volumes of memoirs by others involved in the conspiracy. Wright's book was the most explosive of them all. Wright, embittered by a still-unresolved pension dispute, fled to Australia, where the book was written and finally published – to the fury of Margaret Thatcher – with the assistance of the original programme's chief researcher, Paul Greengrass. Publication in Britain was initially banned outright by the government of Margaret Thatcher.

The series was rarely away from the courts and the threat of legal action. The Scientologists tried – and failed – to stop World in Action's broadcasts about them through the courts, and in 1980, members of the programme's staff and senior executives at Granada TV announced that they would be prepared to go to prison rather than submit to a House of Lords ruling that the programme reveal the identity of an informant who had supplied WIA with 250 pages of secret documents from the then-state-owned British Steel Corporation which was at the time locked in an industrial dispute with its workforce.

In 1995, Susan O'Keeffe, a World in Action journalist, was threatened with prison in Ireland for refusing to reveal her sources. She had investigated scandals within the Irish meat industry in two films in 1991, setting in motion a three-year Tribunal of Inquiry in Dublin, which found that much of her criticism of the industry was substantiated. The tribunal, though, demanded that she name her informants, and when she refused to do so, she was charged by the Irish Director of Public Prosecutions. The case became a cause célèbre in the Republic of Ireland, and in January 1995 she faced trial for contempt of court but was cleared of the charge. O'Keeffe was honoured in the 1994 Freedom of Information Awards for her stand.

In its last few years, the programme was involved in two high-profile libel cases. It won the first (along with The Guardian) against the former Conservative cabinet minister Jonathan Aitken, and lost the second, against the high street chain Marks & Spencer.

On 10 April 1995, Aitken, himself a former journalist for Yorkshire Television, called a televised press conference three hours before the transmission of a World in Action film, Jonathan of Arabia, demanding that allegations about his dealings with leading Saudis be withdrawn. In a phrase that would come to haunt him, Aitken promised to wield "the simple sword of truth and the trusty shield of British fair play ... to cut out the cancer of bent and twisted journalism." Aitken was subsequently sentenced to 18 months in prison for perjuring himself in the resulting libel case. World in Action followed the collapse of Aitken's libel case with a special edition whose title reflected the MP's claim to wield the "sword of truth". It was called The Dagger of Deceit.

== Television techniques ==
Although the series's lasting reputation is for its investigative work, it also led the way in introducing other techniques to mainstream TV. In 1971, years before the rise of "reality" programmes on TV schedules, World in Action challenged the Staffordshire village of Longnor to quit smoking, a forerunner of many of the popular-challenge documentaries that enjoyed success in the 21st-century reality-television boom.

In 1984, World in Action caused a sensation by challenging a rising young Conservative Member of Parliament, Matthew Parris, to live for a week on a £26 unemployment benefit payment to test the reality of his own critical views on unemployed people – Parris subsequently abandoned Parliament for a career as a broadcaster and writer. The same year, World in Action revealed the tricks behind political oratory by coaching a complete beginner, Ann Brennan, to deliver a speech, which won a standing ovation at the annual conference of the Social Democratic Party, using techniques developed by Professor Max Atkinson. Eminent political commentator Sir Robin Day, covering the conference for BBC television, described Mrs Brennan's performance as "[t]he most refreshing speech we've heard so far."

World in Action helped to pioneer the technique of using covert cameras, not just in investigative work, but also in social documentary, including, from the earliest days, the treatment of gypsies, the old in care ("Ward F13"), and poverty in England. The arrival of high-quality miniature cameras allowed ambitious projects such as Donal MacIntyre's award-winning programmes in October 1996 on the illegal drug trade, and the future Conservative MP Adam Holloway's disturbing reports on the reality of life among the homeless in 1991. In 1998, World in Action took advantage of the new technology to equip an entire house with secret cameras hidden in places from coke tins to fish tanks to catch out shoddy builders. The success of the two-part series called House of Horrors, produced by Kate Middleton, led not only to the ITV series House of Horrors and to the BBC's Rogue Traders, but also to a whole new genre of programming, around the world, based around hidden-camera footage of dodgy tradesmen.

World in Action also gave rise to a number of other spin-off series, most famously the Seven Up! documentaries that have followed the lives of a group of British people who turned seven years old in 1963. The most recent, 70 UP, was shown in 2026. Michael Apted directed most episodes; parallel series have also started in South Africa, the US, and Russia.

More recent current-affairs series on other channels, such as the MacIntyre series on BBC and 5, and Channel 4's Dispatches, commissioned by Dorothy Byrne, a former World in Action producer, may be seen as having inherited certain aspects of World in Action's hard-hitting journalistic style.

== World in Action and popular culture ==
One of the programme's hallmarks was its willingness to embrace popular culture, at a time when its competitors preferred a more highbrow approach. One of the earliest editions reported on overspending at the Ministry of Defence in the style of a contemporary gameshow, Beat the Clock. The programme was so controversial, it was banned from being shown on ITV by the then-regulatory body, the Independent Television Authority; instead, 10 minutes of it were shown on the BBC as an act of journalistic solidarity. The gameshow device re-emerged in 1989, when an academic study of the uptake of tax-funded benefits by the middle class was transformed into a mock quiz show named Spongers, fronted by a well-known star of game formats, Nicholas Parsons.

Popular music played a significant role in WIA's history. An early edition, in 1966, carried a fly-on-the-wall account of daily life aboard one of the then-pirate radio ships, Radio Caroline, at a time when the British government was determined to preserve the radio monopoly of the BBC by driving the "pirates" off the air. In 1964, the show covered the launch of the second pirate radio ship, Radio Atlanta, by putting a film crew on board the radio ship as she sailed into position.

After the offshore radio ships were outlawed, only Radio Caroline's two ships continued, so WIA visited one of the ships in September 1967. The British government were furious and banned the camera crew from sailing back into the UK at Felixstowe, just a few miles away, forcing them to sail to Holland and then fly back to the UK.

The long-running intermittent Up series of TV films, which in due course spanned decades, was first broadcast from 1964 as part of World in Action. By its intimate technique of filming the everyday lives of children and interviewing them, a different picture of life in Britain was formed.

In 1967, a young researcher named John Birt established his early reputation by persuading the rock star Mick Jagger to appear on World in Action to debate youth culture and his recent drug conviction, with establishment figures, including William Rees-Mogg of The Times, who had written a famous editorial defending the singer. Jagger so enjoyed the experience that he invited the Granada team to film the Rolling Stones at the band's free 1969 concert in Hyde Park, London. The resulting film, The Stones in the Park, was one of the iconic concert films of the 1960s. John Birt moved on to edit World in Action, and eventually became the director-general of the BBC.

The rise of Thatcherism and the misery of mass unemployment had WIA examining the phenomenon through the eyes of another emerging band, UB40, in A Statistic, A Reminder (1981), a line taken from one of the band's songs. Six years later, a special edition of the programme was devoted to the Irish rock band U2 and their charismatic front man Bono. Like the Rolling Stones before them, U2 allowed World in Action to film one of their classic concerts in 1987 in Ireland. This footage, shot by future Hollywood director Paul Greengrass, was shown only once on ITV because of copyright restrictions, although it has circulated among fans as a bootleg.

In 1983, Stevie Wonder, at the height of his popularity, gave the programme a musical exclusive when he agreed to let a World in Action crew record him performing an unreleased song, written to help Democratic politician Jesse Jackson's electioneering, for The Race Against Reagan. Another popular singer, Sting, appeared in a more critical World in Action episode, which questioned the effectiveness of his Rainforest Foundation. In August 1980, the series devoted an edition to the story behind chart rigging – an ongoing practice where record companies were bribing the British chart compilers to put certain artists' singles higher in the charts than they actually were. Singles mentioned on the programme included several UK number-one hits of the previous 12 months.

Perhaps the most bruising encounter between WIA and popular entertainment was the 1995 film Black and Blue, which featured a covert recording of a performance by comedian Bernard Manning as the star of a charity function organised by the Manchester branch of the Police Federation, which represents rank-and-file officers. Manning's racist and homophobic performance, loudly applauded by those present, caused outrage when WIA broadcast excerpts, sparking an intense debate about the willingness of British police officers to embrace a diverse culture. Former WIA editor Steve Boulton revealed during a 2013 ITV documentary about World in Action that the covert recording had been made by a fellow speaker at the function, former Liverpool Militant politician Derek Hatton, himself a previous target of a World in Action investigation. Hatton used a miniature cassette recorder concealed in Boulton's own Filofax.

== Leading contributors ==
=== Journalists ===
World in Action employed many leading journalists, among them John Pilger; Michael Parkinson; Gordon Burns; Nick Davies, Ed Vulliamy and David Leigh of The Guardian; Alasdair Palmer of The Sunday Telegraph; John Ware, BBC Panorama's leading investigative reporter; Tony Wilson, whose second career as a music impresario was immortalised in the feature film 24 Hour Party People; Michael Gillard, creator of the Slicker business pages in the satirical magazine Private Eye; Donal MacIntyre; the writer Mark Hollingsworth; Quentin McDermott, since 1999 a leading investigative reporter for the Australian Broadcasting Corporation; Tony Watson, editor of the Yorkshire Post for 13 years and editor-in-chief of the Press Association from December 2006; and Andrew Jennings, author of Lords of the Rings and The Dirty Game, who has campaigned vigorously for more than a decade against corruption in international sport.

Two former World in Action journalists uncovered one of the biggest broadcasting scandals of the 1990s. Laurie Flynn, a central figure in the British Steel papers case, and Michael Sean Gillard revealed that large parts of a 1996 Carlton Television documentary, The Connection, about drug trafficking from Colombia, had been fabricated. Flynn and Gillard's exposé in the Guardian in May 1998 led to an inquiry and a record £2 million fine for Carlton from the then-regulator, the Independent Television Commission, as well as provoking a passionate debate about truthfulness in broadcast journalism.

=== Presenters ===
Unusually for a current-affairs programme, WIA's standard format was as a voice-over documentary without a regular reporter, although a handful of WIA journalists did appear in front of camera, including Chris Kelly, Gordon Burns, John Pilger, Gus Macdonald, Nick Davies, Adam Holloway, Stuart Prebble (who later became the programme's editor), Mike Walsh, David Taylor, Donal MacIntyre, and Granada Reports journalist and Factory Records supremo Tony Wilson, who became the show's first in-vision anchor in the early 1980s. Guest presenters were used on rare occasions, among them Jonathan Dimbleby, Sandy Gall, Martyn Gregory, Sue Lawley, and Lynn Faulds Wood. Perhaps its most celebrated guest presenter was distinguished American anchorman Walter Cronkite, who came out of retirement to cover the 1983 UK general election for the series.

A small group of narrators delivered the vast majority of WIA's voice-overs. The two original narrators were Derek Cooper, later to become well known as a broadcaster and writer about food, and Wilfrid Thomas. The science presenter. James Burke, did a number of commentaries on early editions of the programme. Other major contributors included David Plowright, Chris Kelly, Jim Pope, Philip Tibenham, and Andrew Brittain. Among the guest narrators who contributed occasional commentaries were popular actors Robert Lindsay and Jean Boht.

=== Producer-directors ===
The series was known for its gritty visual style, almost always shot on location, and a number of its producer-directors went on to work on major film projects. Those working on the series in its early years included Michael Apted, later to direct Coal Miner's Daughter, Gorillas in the Mist, and the James Bond film The World Is Not Enough, as well as the Up Series documentaries (the earliest programmes were part of the WIA series), and Mike Hodges, who went on to direct Get Carter and Flash Gordon. Director John Goldschmidt made several films for the series in the early 1970s. Later, Paul Greengrass, director of the feature films United 93, The Bourne Supremacy, and The Bourne Ultimatum and of the drama-documentaries Bloody Sunday and The Murder of Stephen Lawrence, cut his directing teeth on World in Action. Leslie Woodhead, director of The Stones in the Park, the award-winning A Cry from the Grave, many Disappearing World films and also regarded by many as a founder of the drama-documentary movement, worked on World in Action for many years as a producer-director and executive. Long-time World in Action alumni who went on to direct and produce Granada's international award-winning Disappearing World films include Brian Moser, its instigator and original producer, and Charlie Nairn.

Among the more recent generation of filmmakers to emerge from World in Action were Alex Holmes, who became editor of the BBC2 documentary strand Modern Times and went on to write and direct the BAFTA-winning dramatised documentary series Dunkirk for the BBC and House of Saddam for the BBC and HBO; and Katy Jones, a former WIA producer who became a key collaborator with the screenwriter Jimmy McGovern as a producer on the drama-documentaries Hillsborough (1996) and Sunday (2002).

=== Broadcasters ===
WIA was a starting point for several key programme-makers who went on to major roles in British broadcasting. John Birt became director-general of the BBC, having been programme controller of the ITV station London Weekend Television, where he created the current-affairs flagship, Weekend World.

Several WIA staffers were promoted to significant roles in Granada Television, among them David Plowright, who became its chairman and later went on to become deputy chairman of Channel 4. Steve Morrison became chief executive at Granada. Gus Macdonald held the same role at another ITV franchise, Scottish Television.

Stuart Prebble, a former editor, became chief executive of ITV, and Steve Anderson became head of news and current affairs for that channel. Both have since moved on to the independent production industry. Ian McBride, who led the team that made the Birmingham Six programmes, became managing editor of Granada TV, and was director of compliance for ITV until 2008.

Dianne Nelmes, who worked as a researcher and executive producer of WIA, was the founding editor of Granada TV's hugely successful This Morning with Richard and Judy and went on to head daytime and factual programmes at ITV.

Dorothy Byrne, a former WIA producer, went on to become head of news and current affairs at Channel 4. Julian Bellamy, who worked as a young researcher on one of WIA's last big foreign investigations – about arms deals between Britain and Indonesia – later headed Channel 4's entertainment channel E4 and was programme controller of the BBC digital channel BBC Three before rejoining Channel 4 as its head of programming from 2007 to 2011. In 2012, Bellamy was appointed creative director of Discovery International.

=== TV production companies ===
A number of WIA veterans went on to set up and run their own independent television production companies. John Smithson and David Darlow, who set up the production company Darlow Smithson, responsible for the feature films Touching the Void and Deep Water and many factual TV programmes including Black Box and The Falling Man, worked together on WIA. Claudia Milne founded twentytwenty TV, which made a successful current-affairs strand for ITV, The Big Story, as well as popular factual series such as Bad Boys' Army' on ITV and That'll Teach 'Em on Channel 4. Brian Lapping set up the much-garlanded Brook Lapping company, which made The Death of Yugoslavia and many other landmark contemporary history programmes. Stuart Prebble, a former editor of World in Action, runs Liberty Bell, best known for the popular Grumpy Old Men series on the BBC. Another former editor, Steve Boulton, started an eponymous company, which made Young, Nazi & Proud, a Bafta-winning profile of the young British National Party activist Mark Collett. Simon Albury went on to lead the Campaign for Quality Television and was a founder director of the ITV company Meridian Broadcasting.

One of the biggest British independent production companies is All 3 Media, which controls several other leading companies, including Lime Pictures, formerly Mersey Television, makers of Hollyoaks. It is run by Steve Morrison, a former WIA producer.

=== Political connections ===
Although in its early days, World in Action was reputed never to employ anyone who was on first-name terms with any politician, a number of subsequent British parliamentarians have World in Action on their curricula vitae. The most recent is the Conservative MP Adam Holloway, elected to the House of Commons in 2005. Former British cabinet minister Jack Straw worked on World in Action as a researcher, as did Margaret Beckett, who served as Tony Blair's last Foreign Secretary. Chris Mullin, Labour MP for Sunderland South from 1987 to 2010, played a major role in the programme's campaign on behalf of the Birmingham Six. Gus Macdonald, now Baron Macdonald of Tradeston, and from 1998 to 2003 a government minister, was formerly an executive on the programme. John Birt (by then ennobled as Baron Birt), was personal adviser to British Prime Minister Tony Blair between 2001 and 2005.

=== Editors ===
Editors of the programme (sometimes with the title of executive producer) were, successively, Tim Hewat, Derek Granger, Alex Valentine, David Plowright, Jeremy Wallington, Leslie Woodhead, John Birt, Gus Macdonald, David Boulton, Brian Lapping, Ray Fitzwalter, Allan Segal, David Cresswell, Stuart Prebble, Nick Hayes, Dianne Nelmes, Charles Tremayne, Steve Boulton, and Jeff Anderson. Anderson also became editor of World in Action's replacement, Tonight, before becoming head of current affairs at ITV in 2006. Mike Lewis, a former WIA producer, was appointed editor of Tonight in October 2006.

=== Academic connections ===
Brian Winston, Pro-Vice Chancellor (External Relations) at the University of Lincoln, who has also held leading posts at the Universities of Westminster, Cardiff, Pennsylvania State and New York, was a researcher and producer in the early series of World in Action.

Ray Fitzwalter, WIA's longest-serving editor and the man behind the ground-breaking Poulson investigations, became a visiting fellow at the University of Salford School of Media, Music, and Performance.

The late Gavin MacFadyen, who worked on early series of World in Action as a producer-director, best known for his undercover human-rights films, became a visiting professor at City University in 2005. He was also director of the Centre for Investigative Journalism.

David Leigh, who made Jonathan of Arabia, the film which provoked Jonathan Aitken's self-destructive libel action, was made Britain's first professor of reporting at City University, London, in September 2006.

=== Camerawork ===
Although a great many director/producers, journalists, and editors passed through the programme, one cameraman played an overwhelming role in shaping the appeal of the series. George Jesse Turner served on the programme from 1966 until its end. By his own count, he shot the principal footage for some 600 of its 1,400 editions, and filmed all of Michael Apted's documentaries in the Seven Up! series. Turner was shot himself – in the backside – by an Israeli bullet while filming a clash between Fatah guerrillas and the Israeli Army in 1969. Shortly before he retired from Granada, Turner was honoured by BAFTA in 1999 for his work as a documentary cameraman.

Among the many cameramen who also contributed to WIA was Chris Menges, who went on to become a distinguished cinematographer – Kes, The Killing Fields, and The Mission are among his credits – and a film director for A World Apart.

== Title sequence ==
Early series were introduced by composer Laurie Johnson's track "Private Eye", but the series is perhaps best remembered for the distinctive title sequence created by John Sheppard in the late 1960s, combining the image of da Vinci's Vitruvian Man with a musical score of a modern classical music structure (inspired by Johann Sebastian Bach's Toccata and Fugues), in a descending series of organ and acoustic guitar chords combined with a jazz rhythm. The score was given the working title of "Jam for World in Action", and has been credited variously to Jonathon Weston or Shawn Phillips. English musician Mick Weaver also claims to have jointly authored the score with Phillips. The track was covered by Matt Berry in 2018 on his album Television Themes.

== Books and articles ==
- Jonathan Aitken (2003), Pride and Perjury, London: Continuum International Publishing Group – Academi.
- Ray Fitzwalter (2008), The Dream That Died: The Rise And Fall Of ITV, London: Matador.
- Ray Fitzwalter, David Taylor (1981), Web of Corruption: The Story of J. G. L. Poulson and T. Dan Smith, London: Granada.
- Denis Forman (1997), Persona Granada, London: Andre Deutsch
- Peter Goddard (2004), 'World in Action', in Glen Creeber (ed.), Fifty Key Television Programmes, London: Arnold.
- Peter Goddard (2006), '"Improper liberties": Regulating undercover journalism on ITV, 1967–1980', Journalism, 7(1): 45–63.
- Peter Goddard, John Corner and Kay Richardson (2001), 'The formation of World in Action: A case study in the history of current affairs journalism', Journalism, 2(1): 73–90.
- Peter Goddard, John Corner and Kay Richardson (2007), Public Issue Television: World in Action 1963–98, Manchester: Manchester University Press.
- Luke Harding, David Leigh and David Pallister (1997), The Liar: The Fall of Jonathan Aitken, London: Penguin Books Ltd.
- Jonathan Margolis (1996), Bernard Manning, London: Orion Books
- Chris Mullin (1990), Error of Judgement: Birmingham Bombings, Dublin: Poolbeg Press.
- George Jesse Turner, Jeff Anderson (2000), Trouble Shooter: Life Through The Lens of World in Action's Top Cameraman, London: Granada Media.

== See also ==
- Unreported World, another current affairs program, broadcast on Channel 4.
