= Max Atkinson =

British author (1944–2024)

John Maxwell Atkinson (19 March 1944 – 3 July 2024) was a British academic and author. He worked with a number of politicians and business leaders and is known for his research on speech writing and presentation skills in the fields of political speeches, courtroom language and conversation.

== Early life and academic career ==
Atkinson was born in Pontefract, Yorkshire on 19 March 1944. After completing a PhD degree in Sociology at the University of Essex in 1969, Atkinson worked as a Lecturer at the University of Lancaster (1969–72) and the University of Manchester (1973–76) and was a Fellow of Wolfson College at the University of Oxford from 1976 to 1988. Atkinson also held a visiting professorship at Henley Management College for ten years and for shorter periods at other universities in Sweden, Austria and the United States.

== Public speaking and speech writing career ==
Atkinson first came to prominence in 1984 with the publication of his book Our Masters' Voices: The Language and Body Language of Politics, in which he outlined research which demonstrated how particular sets of rhetorical techniques can trigger applause from the audience during political speeches. These techniques were put to the test that year in a Granada Television World in Action programme in which Atkinson demonstrated how a speaker with no previous public speaking experience could be coached to win multiple rounds of applause and a standing ovation at the annual conference of the Social Democratic Party in the UK. Sir Robin Day, commenting for BBC television, described the conference speech delivered by Ann Brennan, who Atkinson had coached, as "the most refreshing speech we've heard so far", while The Guardian said that it "lit up the conference as no other speech had done all week".

In 1985, Atkinson ran a seminar on speech writing at the White House during Ronald Reagan's Presidency. From 1987 to 1999, Atkinson was an advisor and speech writer for the leader of the Liberal Democrats, Paddy Ashdown. Ashdown has noted: "There was scarcely a single major speech, in my eleven years as leader of the Liberal Democrats that I made without benefiting from Max Atkinson’s personal advice and help."

Atkinson published a number of books and was also noted as a blogger for his commentary on public communications.

== Later life and death ==
In 2015, he was awarded a lifetime achievement award by the UK Speechwriters' Guild.

In March 2016, Atkinson was made a Fellow of the Academy of Social Science (FAcSS) for his contributions to social science.

Atkinson died from bronchial pneumonia on 3 July 2024, at the age of 80.

== Books ==
Max Atkinson's books include:

- Discovering Suicide: Studies in the social organisation of sudden death, Macmillan, 1978.
- Order in Court: the organisation of verbal interaction in judicial settings(with Paul Drew), Macmillan, 1979.
- Structures of Social Action: Studies in conversation analysis(edited with John Heritage), Cambridge University Press, 1984.
- Our Masters' Voices: the Language and Body Language of Politics, Routledge, 1984.
- Lend Me Your Ears: All You Need to Know About Making Speeches and Presentations, Vermilion, 2004.
- Speech-Making and Presentation Made Easy, Vermilion, 2008.
- Seen and Heard: Conversations and Commentary on Contemporary Communication, Gunmakers, 2014.

Some of Atkinson's books have been published in the USA and several translated into other languages, including Spanish and Russian.
