= Tim Hewat =

Australian journalist (1928–2004)

Timothy Edward Patterson Hewat (4 May 1928 – 19 May 2004) was an Australian television producer and journalist. He has been described as the "maverick genius of Granada television's current affairs in its formative years" and "one of the true greats of the medium."

Born in New Zealand, he was raised in Australia and educated at Geelong Grammar School, where a contemporary was Rupert Murdoch. After a start as a cub reporter on the Melbourne Age, he migrated to London in 1948. He was a reporter, then a sub-editor on the Daily Express, followed by a move to Canada to work at The Globe and Mail in Toronto.

Returning to Britain in the late 1950s, he joined Granada TV's Searchlight programme (1959–60) in Manchester as a current affairs producer. Hewat is most celebrated for creating Granada's revolutionary and long-running World in Action in 1963.

Hewat later went back briefly to the Daily Express as a senior editorial executive. His second marriage was to Granada casting director Ann Suudi. They had two children. He returned to Australia in the late 1960s and wrote many self-help books. He died aged 76 from injuries sustained in a road accident.

== Works ==
- Who Made the Mabo Mess, Wrightbooks, North Brighton, Vic., c1993.
- The Intelligent Investor's Guide to Share Buying, 3rd edition, Wrightbooks, North Brighton, Vic., 1994.
