= My Life So Far =

1999 film directed by Hugh Hudson

- Theatrical release poster
- Directed by: Hugh Hudson
- Screenplay by: Simon Donald
- Based on: Son of Adam by Denis Forman
- Produced by: Steve Norris; David Puttnam
- Starring: Colin Firth; Rosemary Harris; Irène Jacob; Tchéky Karyo; Mary Elizabeth Mastrantonio; Malcolm McDowell; Kelly Macdonald; Robert Norman
- Cinematography: Bernard Lutic
- Edited by: Scott Thomas
- Music by: Howard Blake
- Distributed by: Miramax Films (through Buena Vista International in the United Kingdom)
- Release date: 23 July 1999
- Running time: 98 minutes
- Countries: United Kingdom; United States
- Language: English
- Budget: $7 million
- Box office: $635,620

My Life So Far is a 1999 film about a year in the life of ten-year-old Scottish boy Fraser Pettigrew. It was directed by Hugh Hudson, with screenplay by Simon Donald. The film is set in 1927 and is based on Son of Adam, the memoirs of Denis Forman, a British television executive.

== Plot ==
The film tells the story of how the Pettigrew family, living in their family estate Kiloran House in Scotland, deal with changes brought by the end of World War I, told through the point of view of one of the Pettigrew children, Fraser.

The family is headed by the maternal grandmother MacIntosh, affectionately known as "Gamma", whose decisions are to be obeyed without question. Gamma's son Morris left home to build a career for himself and become a well-to-do businessman; while her younger daughter Moira followed the traditional route – she fell in love with Edward Pettigrew, gave up becoming an opera singer and settled down at her family estate to raise a large family.

Edward, typical of country gentry, owns a minor business (turning sphagnum moss into medical dressings), is pious and a defender of traditional values (gives a speech at every Sunday service), loves and listens only to Ludwig van Beethoven and has a passion for inventions and mechanical improvements all over the estate. All of which are laughed at by Morris, who lives in London but comes back to visit often, as he is competing with Edward to inherit the estate after Gamma passes away; they mutually loathe each other.

Edward does not appreciate and resists changes in the world, but the harder he tries, the more things fall apart. Morris and his beautiful and charming French fiancée Heloise introduce jazz to the children ("the sound of the devil speaking" according to Edward). An emergency landing brings the eldest daughter Elspeth's first suitor – French show pilot Gabriel Chenoux. Fraser finds grandfather MacIntosh's hidden book collection, and to rebel against his father, sets out to read them all. He misunderstands the definition of "prostitution", and believing it to be a business term, suggests to all guests at Morris and Heloise's engagement party that Moira, Heloise and Gamma should go into prostitution to enhance the moss business. Worst of all, Edward makes a pass at Heloise prior to the wedding.

During a curling game held in her husband's honor, Gamma falls through the ice into the lake, which shortly causes her death by pneumonia. She bequeathed the estate to Edward, leading to a physical altercation between Edward and Morris at her wake, during which Edward claims that Morris lost more than the estate to him. Thereby, Moira finally confronts him, saying she has been aware of him and Heloise all along.

Months pass before Edward finally wins back Moira, and the family settles back into its old routine. On a Sunday morning, all Pettigrews are heading to church, except Fraser. Edward finds him relaxing in a chaise longue in the library, looking at one of grandfather MacIntosh's pornographic books with a cognac glass filled with milk in one hand and a lit cigar in the other, swaying his head and body to Louis Armstrong's "On the Sunny Side of the Street" (a secret gift from Heloise). Instead of being angry, he smiles and closes the door, leaving Fraser to enjoy himself.

== Cast ==
- Colin Firth as Edward Pettigrew
- Rosemary Harris as Gamma MacIntosh
- Irène Jacob as Aunt Heloise
- Mary Elizabeth Mastrantonio as Moira "Mumsie" Pettigrew
- Malcolm McDowell as Uncle Morris MacIntosh
- Robert Norman as Fraser Pettigrew
- Tchéky Karyo as Gabriel Chenoux
- Kelly Macdonald as Elspeth Pettigrew
- Titus MacTavish as Village Boy
- Jamie MacTavish as Gardener

== Reception ==
My Life So Far received fairly positive reviews from critics, as it currently holds a 70% rating on Rotten Tomatoes based on 27 reviews.
