= Charles Tremayne =

British television executive

Charles Tremayne is a British television executive and producer. He won an Emmy Award as Executive Producer of American Pickers. In April 2020, Tremayne transitioned from his role as President of Cineflix Productions to the new role of Chair of the Cineflix Content Group, a working alliance of its producers and creatives.

Earlier he was Controller of Factual Programmes for Granada Television and Executive Producer for current affairs programme World in Action.

He was portrayed by Roger Allam in the docudrama Who Bombed Birmingham? (also presented as The Investigation: Inside a Terrorist Bombing). He commissioned Keith Floyd to present a World in Action programme on convenience food and, in December 1993, clashed with Alan Sugar over "Tottenham's tax problem", an exposé of interest-free loans in breach of League rules.

When Tonight with Trevor McDonald replaced World in Action, Tremayne helped the new show obtain interviews with the original five Stephen Lawrence murder suspects.

After 1999 Tremayne began working on American TV.
