= Disappearing World (TV series) =

- Cover of the Disappearing World Vol. 1 DVD box set
- Genre: Television documentary
- Created by: Brian Moser
- Country of origin: United Kingdom
- Original languages: English, various languages (subtitled in English)
- No. of episodes: 49

Original release
- Network: Granada Television
- Release: 19 May 1970 – 25 May 1993

Disappearing World is a British documentary television series produced by Granada Television, which produced 49 episodes between 1970 and 1993. The episodes, each an hour long, focus on a specific human community around the world, usually but not always a traditional tribal group.

== Series title ==
The title of the series invokes salvage ethnography, and indeed, some of the early episodes treat small societies on the cusp of great changes. However, later the series tried to escape the constraints of the title and already in the 1970s produced several episodes about urban, complex societies. In 1980, Peter Loizos characterized the series title as "something of an albatross"; some filmmakers had suggested alternatives they saw as less problematic, but Granada declined to change it. David Wason, the series producer in the 1990s, observed, "We recognise that the series title can be misleading. Our films more often reflect a changing world than a disappearing one."

== Filming of episodes ==
Each episode was filmed on 16 mm film, on location, usually over the course of about four weeks. They were then edited back at Granada, usually allowing three months for the process. Each episode was made in consultation with an anthropologist, working with the producer from the episode's conception, and building off of their personal relationships with the featured community.

In the United States, some of the episodes were re-edited as part of the PBS series "NOVA" (1974), and Odyssey (1980-1981), indeed, they made up a quarter of the first season. Later, episodes from the original Disappearing World ran but received little publicity.

== Broadcasts ==
The series was made available outside of broadcasts early, and proved themselves successful for teaching undergraduate anthropology. Already in 1980, Granada Television had made the series available on videocassettes for educational purposes. Most of the films are held in the Royal Anthropological Institute film library. Much of the series is now available on DVD. The Network imprint issued a 4-DVD set of the first 15 episodes in 2010.

== History ==
In the 1960s, Denis Forman, the chairman of Granada Television, saw an amateur film made in the Amazon and became convinced that well-researched and well-made ethnographic films could have a broad appeal. He sought out its director/producer, Brian Moser, and had him train professionally at Granada, in exchange for backing for a series of documentaries about indigenous people in South America. The show debuted in 1970 with A Clearing in the Jungle, directed by World-in-Action's Charlie Nairn, and Moser remained the series editor until 1977, when, despite its success, the series went on hiatus due to production disputes.

Production resumed in the early 1980s, producing three episodes most years, under a succession of series editors including André Singer, Leslie Woodhead, and David Wason.

== Reception ==
The series received unusually high ratings for a documentary. In 1978, it was voted the best commercial series in that year.

The series was largely well-received by anthropologists. Of its initial run in the 1970s, Gregory A. Finnegan said: "The series has brought an unprecedented wide awareness of anthropological subjects and, arguably, anthropology to the British public." Peter Loizos wrote that the series had had "the most positive influence in the British mass media on public views both of 'primitive people' and of social anthropology." Among anthropologists, it led to a great deal of writing, discussing documentary film style, working conditions, cooperation between filmmakers and anthropologists, and accounts of films; assessments had been both positive and negative.

Upon the broadcast of the series in the United States, John Corry in The New York Times characterized its approach as a "throwback" to "the old days of educational television," with an "austere ethos" that allows viewers to make their own judgments.

After reviewing The Last of the Cuiva, Pia and David Maybury-Lewis, Cultural Survival Inc. and Harvard University said, "We saw the film twice because we had to, but I would recommend that anyone else should do the same for enjoyment, awe, sorrow, and time to contemplate what is going on in the indigenous world, if one can use such a term. The Last of the Cuiva is first and foremost an anthropological film that tries to tell “how it was” and “how it is now.” One hopes against hope that the latter is overdone, but of course, if one reads the newspapers, one knows that the film is right."

== Awards ==
It was nominated for the BAFTA award for Factual Series every year from 1975 to 1978, winning in 1976. It was nominated again in 1991. The episode We Are All Neighbors won an International Emmy Award for Best Documentary at the 21st International Emmy Awards, sharing the honor with Monika and Jonas – The Face of the Informer State.

== Episodes ==
Episode No.	Title	Ethnic group	Director/producer	Anthropologist	Broadcast date
1	A Clearing in the Jungle	Panare	Charlie Nairn	Jean-Paul Dumont	19 May 1970
2	The Last of the Cuiva	Cuiva	Brian Moser	Bernard Arcand	8 June 1971, as part of NOVA series 31 March 1974
3	Embera: The End of the Road	Emberá	Brian Moser	Ariane Deluz	15 June 1971
4	War of the Gods	Maku and Barasana	Brian Moser	Peter Silverwood-Cope and Christine and Stephen Hugh-Jones	22 June 1971
5	The Tuareg	Tuareg	Charlie Nairn	Jeremy Keenan	18 April 1972
6	The Meo	Miao	Brian Moser	Jacques Lemoine	4 July 1972
7	Kataragama: A God for All Seasons	Sri Lankan	Charlie Nairn	Gananath Obeyesekere	20 November 1973
8	Dervishes of Kurdistan	Kurds	Brian Moser	André Singer and Ali Bulookbashi	4 October 1974
9	The Mursi	Mursi	Leslie Woodhead	David Turton	13 November 1974
10	Mehinacu	Mehinaku	Carlos Pasini	Thomas Gregor	20 November 1974
11	Masai Women	Maasai	Chris Curling	Melissa Llewelyn-Davies	27 November 1974
12	Quechua	Quechua	Carlos Pasini	Michael Sallnow	4 December 1974
13	Ongka's Big Moka: The Kawelka of Papua New Guinea	Kawelka	Charlie Nairn	Andrew Strathern	11 December 1974
14	The Sakuddei	Sakuddei	John Sheppard	Reimar Schefold	18 December 1974
15	Masai Manhood	Maasai	Chris Curling	Melissa Llewelyn-Davies	8 April 1975
16	The Kirghiz	Kirghiz	Charlie Nairn and André Singer	Nazif Shahrani	29 December 1975
17	The Shilluk	Shilluk	Chris Curling	Paul Howell, Walter Kunijwok, and André Singer	5 January 1976
18	Eskimos of Pond Inlet - The People's Land	Inuit	Michael Grigsby	Hugh Brody	12 January 1976
19	Some Women of Marrakesh	Moroccan	Melissa Llewelyn-Davies	Elizabeth Fernea	26 January 1977
20	The Rendille	Rendille	Chris Curling	Anders Grum	23 February 1977
21	Sherpas	Sherpas	Leslie Woodhead and Pattie Winter	Sherry Ortner	13 April 1977
22	Umbanda	Brazilians	Stephen Cross	Peter Fry	23 November 1977
23	The Pathans	Afghans	André Singer	Akbar Ahmed and Remy Dor	20 February 1980
24	Witchcraft Among the Azande	Azande	André Singer	John Ryle	9 March 1982
25	Asante Market Women	Asante	Claudia Milne	Charlotte Boaitey	16 March 1982
26	The Kwegu	Kwegu	Leslie Woodhead	David Turton	23 March 1982
27	Inside China: Living with the Revolution	Chinese	Leslie Woodhead	Claire Lasko	27 April 1983
28	Inside China: The Newest Revolution	Chinese	Leslie Woodhead	Claire Lasko	4 May 1983
29	Inside China: The Kazakhs of China	Kazakhs in China	André Singer	Shirin Akiner	18 May 1983
30	The Migrants	Mursi and Kwegu	Leslie Woodhead	David Turton	14 October 1985
31	The Kayapo	Kayapo	Michael Beckham	Terence Turner	3 June 1987
32	The Basques of Santazi	Basques	Leslie Woodhead	Sandra Ott	10 June 1987
33	The Lau of Malaita	Lau	Leslie Woodhead	Pierre Maranda	1987
34	The Whalehunters of Lamalera	Lembatans	John Blake and David Wason	Robert Barnes	13 July 1988
35	Across the Tracks: Vlach Gypsies in Hungary	Vlachs	John Blake	Michael Stewart	20 July 1988
36	The Wodaabe	Wodaabe	Leslie Woodhead and David Wason	Mette Bovin	27 July 1988
37	The Kayapo: Out of the Forest	Kayapo	Michael Beckham	Terence Turner	13 June 1989
38	Villagers of the Sierra De Gredos	Spaniards	Peter Carr	William Kavanagh	20 June 1989
39	The Herders of Mongun-Taiga	Tuvans	John Sheppard	Caroline Humphrey	27 June 1989
40	The Mende	Mende	Bruce MacDonald	Marianne Ferme	18 July 1990
41	Trobriand Islanders of Papua New Guinea	Trobrianders	David Wason	Annette B. Weiner	25 July 1990
42	The Kalasha: Rites of Spring	Kalasha	John Sheppard	Peter Parks	1 August 1990
43	The Mursi - The Land Is Bad	Mursi	Leslie Woodhead	David Turton	17 July 1991
44	The Mursi - Nitha	Mursi	Leslie Woodhead	David Turton	24 July 1991
45	The Albanians of Rrogam	Krasniqi	David Wason	Berit Backer	31 July 1991
46	Cakchiquel Maya of San Antonio Palopo	Kaqchikel	Bruce MacDonald	Tracy Bachrach Ehlers	7 August 1991
47	War: We Are All Neighbours	Bosnians	Debbie Christie	Tone Bringa	11 May 1993
48	War: Orphans of Passage - Sudan	Uduk	Bruce MacDonald		18 May 1993
49	War: The Longest Struggle	Karen	John Sheppard	Tom Sheahan	25 May 1993

At the request of the Mongolian government, the episodes filmed in Mongolia during the 1970s were not distributed under the title Disappearing World, but should be considered in essence part of the series.

Episode No.	Title	Ethnic group	Director/producer	Anthropologist	Broadcast date
	On the Edge of the Gobi	Khalka Mongols	Brian Moser	Owen Lattimore	1975
	The City on the Steppes	Khalka Mongols	Brian Moser	Owen Lattimore	1975
