= Elizabeth Warnock Fernea =

American anthropologist, writer and filmmaker

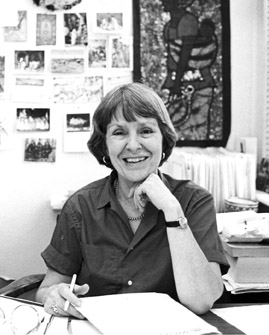
Elizabeth Warnock Fernea

Elizabeth Warnock Fernea (October 21, 1927 – December 2, 2008) was an influential writer and filmmaker who spent much of her life in the field producing numerous ethnographies and films that capture the struggles and turmoil of African and Middle Eastern cultures. Her husband, the anthropologist Robert A. Fernea, was a large influence in her life. Fernea is commonly regarded as a pioneer for women in the field of Middle East Studies.

== Biography ==
Fernea was born October 21, 1927, in Milwaukee, Wisconsin. Her father was a mining engineer and was eventually sent to Flin Flon in Manitoba, Canada by his firm. Instead of forcing his family to live on the firm’s compound, he opted to live in town with ordinary people. This choice might have sparked a later interest in anthropology because, as an American, Fernea was marginalized by her fellow Canadian students. Since it was the Depression, the other children on the street did not take kindly to Americans so this was her first taste of being an “outsider”. During an interview with Fayza Hassan, Fernea stated that the other kids would yell at her window saying “It’s not that we hate you, it’s just that you’re American.” In addition to being an outsider while growing up, Fernea learned from her mother that it is the norm to follow your husband where his job takes him. These two lessons could possibly be the reason why she was so willing to go with her husband Robert to Iraq and why she was able to eventually fit in with the women there.

Going to school during the Depression was a good experience for Fernea. Because teaching jobs were hard to come by in America, her local school was staffed with great teachers who moved to Canada instead. However, when World War II broke out, her family moved to Portland, Oregon. Upon her arrival to school in America, she was bored with the curriculum and found it far less challenging than in Canada. After high school she obtained her degree in English from Reed College in Portland. Her postgraduate work was done at Mount Holyoke College in Massachusetts as well as at the University of Chicago. She met Robert Fernea at Reed College and married him in 1956.

After she married Robert in 1956, she followed him to Iraq so he could finish his doctorate in anthropology. For two years she stayed with him in the village of El Nahra, near Al Diwaniyah in southeastern Iraq. While there, she learned a lot about women of the Middle East. Fernea initially did not want to wear the veil or abayah but after being stared at, she decided it was best to don the clothing worn by the women of El Nahra. Fernea thought it might be better to try to act as an insider and not be the marginalized outcast, so instead of fighting this culture, she imitated it to try to learn from it. Fayza Hassan argued that “This may have been the awakening of Fernea’s true pioneer spirit, but more importantly it underlined one of her more endearing traits, a genuine humility embodied in her belief that she has a duty to share the burden of the less fortunate without complaint, a price to pay for being lucky enough to belong to another, trouble-free world to which she will eventually return,”.

Another thing that struck her, which might have opened her eyes to this subject, is the fact that these women did not envy her but felt sorry for her. “And the chastening realization that the women had pitied me. Pitied me, college-educated, adequately dressed and fed, free to vote and to travel, happily married to a husband of my own choice who was also a friend and companion.” It was seen as a misfortune that she was skinny, had shorter hair, no children, no mother and no gold. These women did not see themselves as being secluded from the outside world, where they could have limitless choices, and this was mind-boggling to Fernea. She concluded that these two cultures were, and still are essentially, too stubborn to see each other's side of the story. This was a problem for Fernea, since she ended up questioning what the point of their study was if this gap between cultures would only widen.

By the end of her stay, she felt like she was leaving home when she and Robert came back to America. She had become very close with the women from El Nahra and had created lifelong friendships with some of them. It was after she was back that Robert and her friend Audrey Walz kept encouraging her to publish her writings about her stay in El Nahra. Finally she decided to finish it and publish the ethnography even though, as she states in the introduction, she is not an anthropologist. Even though she was not technically an anthropologist she continued to write ethnographies about her experiences.

From 1959 to 1965, Fernea and Robert lived in Cairo where Robert taught anthropology at the American University in Cairo. While there, she and Robert had their three children. In 1965, the family moved back to the United States and Cambridge, Massachusetts, while Robert taught at Harvard for one year. In 1966, they moved to Austin, Texas, and the University of Texas. Robert eventually became the director of the Center for Middle Eastern Studies at the University of Texas. Fernea became a senior lecturer in 1975 for the University of Texas and eventually a full-time professor in 1990. From 1980 to 1983 she was the chairwoman for the University’s Women’s Studies Program. Between 1985 and 1986 she was the president of the Middle East Studies Association of North America, and in 1994 she received an honorary doctorate from the State University at New York.

In 1986, Fernea and Robert co-authored the article “Symbolizing Roles: Behind the Veil” about the veiling in Middle Eastern culture. Since veiling is a major difference between the West and Middle East, Fernea felt obliged to try to show the West how Middle Eastern women feel about the veil. One of the skills it appears she obtained from living in El Nahra was the ability to learn from that culture and also realize that it needs to be taught to outsiders. A main goal was to show each side what the other looks like, so a major issue she wanted to explain to western women was that veiling does not mean the women are forced against their will to live lives of submission and near serfdom. It was their choice and it is part of their beliefs and customs. Firsthand experience taught her that the veil is used for protection from dust, heat and flies. Furthermore, the anonymity that comes with wearing a veil is much appreciated. A woman can go out into town and not worry about being ogled at by strangers.

In addition to writing about Middle Eastern culture, Fernea was also a film producer. She earned two National Endowment for the Humanities grants and her list of produced films contain: “Reformers and Revolutionaries: Middle Eastern Women,” “The Struggle for Peace: Israelis and Palestinians,” “The Road to Peace: Israelis and Palestinians,” and “Living with the Past,” The documentary “Living with the Past” deals with the restoration of Al-Darb Al-Ahmar in Egypt. She showed a personal and genuine concern for these people who were being displaced from their homes so historical monuments could be preserved. She argued that the spirit of a place should be captured through its people not through monuments. Instead of showing Egypt as a land of pharaohs and giant pyramids, she wanted to show Americans what Egypt is really like and how they deal with their historical surroundings. She wanted to bring Middle Eastern culture closer to home for Americans, which is something she tried to do after living in Iraq for two years. To show even fellow Egyptians the richness of this culture, she produced copies of her documentary in Arabic and gave copies away to Egyptian television to get the story told. As with before, Fernea had a personal drive to explain the different cultures of West and Middle Eastern life.

In 1999, Fernea retired from teaching at the University of Texas and her scholarly books include: “Guests of the Sheik: An Ethnography of an Iraqi Village,” “A View of the Nile,” “A Street in Marrakech,” “Middle Eastern Muslim Women Speak,” “Women and Family in the Middle East: New Voices of Change,” and “In Search of Islamic Feminism: One Woman’s Global Journey.”

== Bibliography ==
- Remembering Childhood in the Middle East: Memoirs from a Century of Change
- Guests of the Sheik: An Ethnography of an Iraqi Village New York: Anchor Books, 1965. ISBN 0385014856.
- The Arab World
- The Struggle for Peace: Israelis and Palestinians
- A Street in Marrakech
- Women and the Family in the Middle East: New Voices of Change (ed.) ISBN 0292755287
- Children in the Muslim Middle East
- Nubian Ethnographies
- A View of the Nile
- Middle Eastern Muslim Women Speak
- In Search of Islamic Feminism: One Woman's Global Journey

== Filmography ==
- Living with the Past: Historic Cairo
- A Veiled Revolution: Women and Religion in Egypt
- The Struggle for Peace: Israelis and Palestinians
- Some Women of Marrakech (episode of Disappearing Worlds TV series)
- Saints and Spirits
