= Endurance (film) =

1998 docudrama film about Haile Gebrselassie directed by Leslie Woodhead

- Directed by: Leslie Woodhead
- Written by: Leslie Woodhead
- Produced by: Terrence Malick; Max Palevsky; Edward R. Pressman
- Starring: Haile Gebrselassie; Shawananness Gebrselassie; Yonas Zergaw; Tedesse Haile; Bekele Gebrselassie; Alem Tellahun
- Cinematography: Ivan Strasburg
- Edited by: Saar Klein; Oral Norrie Ottey
- Music by: John Powell
- Production companies: FilmFour; Helkon Filmverleih GmbH (as Helkon Media); La Junta; Walt Disney Pictures
- Distributed by: Buena Vista Pictures Distribution
- Release date: September 1998 (Telluride Film Festival)
- Running time: 83 minutes
- Countries: United States; United Kingdom; Germany
- Language: English

Endurance is a 1998 documentary film about the famous distance runner Haile Gebrselassie with Gebrselassie playing himself.

It was written and directed by Leslie Woodhead, with Bud Greenspan supervising the competition sequences, and produced and released by Walt Disney Pictures. The movie features Gebrselassie's upbringing in Ethiopia and his subsequent triumph in the 10,000-meter track event in the Atlanta Olympic Games of 1996.

The movie was released on DVD on January 31, 2012.

== See also ==
- List of films about the sport of athletics
