= A Cry from the Grave =

- Directed by: Leslie Woodhead
- Written by: Leslie Woodhead
- Produced by: Leslie Woodhead
- Narrated by: Leslie Woodhead (UK); Bill Moyers (US)
- Production companies: Antelope Films; BBC; Thirteen/WNET; NPS; WDR; Ryninks Films
- Distributed by: BBC Worldwide
- Release date: 27 November 1999
- Running time: 104 minutes
- Country: United Kingdom
- Languages: English; Serbo-Croat

A Cry from the Grave or Srebrenica: A Cry from the Grave is a 1999 British documentary film about the 1995 Srebrenica massacre. The film was directed and produced by Leslie Woodhead.

Using testimony of survivors and relatives the documentary tells the story of the massacre of over 8,000 Bosnian men and boys by the Bosnian Serb Army. The documentary was used in the war crimes trial at The Hague.

== Awards ==
The documentary won the Special Jury Award for Feature-Length Documentary at the 12th International Documentary Film Festival Amsterdam in December 1999. At the 13th Biarritz International Festival of Audiovisual Programming in January 2000 the documentary won the silver FIPA award in the Documentary and Essay category. The documentary won the Mayor of Prague award at the second One World Film Festival in Prague in April 2000.

In June 2000 the documentary won the Air Canada Grand Prize and the Best History or Biography Programme award at the 21st Banff Television Festival. In September 2000 the documentary won the Information category award at the fifth Gouden Beelden. It won first prize in the International Television category at the 33rd Robert F. Kennedy Journalism Award in 2001. The documentary was nominated for the Outstanding Background/Analysis of a Single Current Story - Programs award at the 22nd News & Documentary Emmy Award in September 2001.

== Broadcast ==
The documentary was broadcast on BBC Two in the UK on 27 November 1999 as part of the Storyville series. In the Netherlands, the documentary was broadcast on Ned 3 on 6 December 1999. In the US, the documentary was broadcast on PBS on 17 January 2000 and narrated by Bill Moyers.

The broadcast of the documentary on Radio Television of Serbia (RTS) in the summer of 2001, on the sixth anniversary of the massacre, resulted in a storm of protests, including opposition politicians calling for the dismissal of senior RTS staff.
