= Denis Forman =

British television executive (1917–2013)

Sir John Denis Forman (13 October 1917 – 24 February 2013) was a Scottish executive in the British television industry long associated with the ITV contractor Granada, and with various charitable and governmental bodies in the arts.

== Career ==
Forman was born in 1917 in Cragielands, near Moffat, in Dumfries, to the Rev Adam Forman, an Episcopalian vicar and country gentleman who later became a Presbyterian minister. The family lived in a house built in the Palladian style and were devout. Forman recounted his childhood in his memoir Son of Adam (1990, filmed as My Life So Far in 1999). He was educated at Loretto School, Musselburgh and Pembroke College, Cambridge.

Forman had a distinguished military career during the Second World War and was wounded at Monte Cassino, losing a leg. After the war he joined the British Film Institute and was its director from 1949 to 1955. Later he was chair of its board of governors, from 1971 to 1973.

After his main period of work at the BFI, Forman joined the new Granada Television in 1955, an ITV contractor which went on air in the following year, being appointed by Cecil Bernstein (brother of Sidney) who was a BFI governor at the time. He was chairman from 1974 to 1987, and deputy chairman of the Granada Group from 1984 to 1990. He was also deputy chairman of the Royal Opera House Covent Garden, from 1983 to 1991. Throughout his career, Forman encouraged young talent and amongst others, mentored the founder of Channel 4 Sir Jeremy Isaacs and musician and businessman David Wood.

At Granada Forman presided over the creation of the acclaimed series The Jewel in the Crown and such ground-breaking programmes as World in Action, Disappearing World, University Challenge and Family at War.

== Personal life ==
Forman married Helen de Mouilpied in 1948 and they had two sons, Charlie and Adam. She died in 1987. He married again in 1990, to Moni, the widow of the journalist James Cameron. He died of a heart attack in a nursing home in London, aged 95.

== Publications ==
- Mozart’s Piano Concertos, 1971
- Son of Adam (autobiography, vol.1), 1990
- To Reason Why (autobiography, vol.2), 1991
- The Good Opera Guide, (ed.) 1994
- Persona Granada: Some Memories of Sidney Bernstein and the Early Days of Independent Television (memoir), 1997
- A Night at the Opera: An Irreverent Guide to The Plots, The Singers, The Composers, The Recordings, 1998
- The Good Wagner Guide, 2000

== See also ==
- List of atheists in film, radio, television and theater
- John Grierson
- David Plowright
