= David Plowright =

British television executive and producer (1930–2006)

David Plowright CBE
- Born: David Ernest Plowright; 11 December 1930; Scunthorpe, Lincolnshire, England
- Died: 24 August 2006 (aged 75); Prestbury, Cheshire, England
- Occupations: Television executive, producer
- Spouse: Brenda Key (m. 1953)
- Children: 3
- Relatives: Joan Plowright (sister)

David Ernest Plowright (11 December 1930 – 24 August 2006) was a British television executive and producer.

== Life ==
Plowright was educated at Scunthorpe Grammar School. He began his career in journalism as a reporter on the Scunthorpe Star, and was, briefly, the equestrian correspondent of the Yorkshire Post. He joined Granada Television as news editor in 1957.

Plowright rose to become Controller of Programmes from 1969 to 1979, and he succeeded Denis Forman first as managing director, and then Chairman of Granada Television in 1987. The outlook of Granada TV, under the leadership of Foreman and Plowright was described as "non-conformist, alternative, non-London". He easily steered Granada through 1991 ITV franchise auctions by threatening to sell Coronation Street, Granada's signature show and one of the channel's biggest assets, to satellite television if their bid was rejected. Plowright was forced out in 1992 by Gerry Robinson, the new chief executive, which led to John Cleese describing Robinson as an "upstart caterer". Plowright's exit was regarded as a turning point in the process whereby ITV gave profits a bigger priority than programme quality.

At Granada, Plowright was a defender of the often controversial current affairs programme, World in Action. Under his leadership, dramas such as Brideshead Revisited and The Jewel In The Crown became successes for the company.

In 1993, Plowright, with the support and backing of the University of Salford established the Nations and Regions Media Conference (now Salford International Media Festival) to champion the cause of regional broadcasters and producers. He believed the nations and regions of the United Kingdom should have a bigger share in the production and decision-making processes of the major broadcasters.

== Family ==
Plowright was the younger brother of actress Joan Plowright, who was married to Laurence Olivier. The connection led to Olivier appearing in several Granada drama productions, including Brideshead Revisited. Plowright married Brenda Key in 1953; they had a son and two daughters.
