= Cathy Massiter =

Cathy Massiter is a British whistleblower and former member of MI5 who revealed that the British security service carried out surveillance of British trade unions, civil rights organisations and the Campaign for Nuclear Disarmament. She sustained her revelations via an affidavit.

From the late 1960s until the mid-1970s, the MI5 designated the CND, an anti-nuclear weapons organisation, as subversive by virtue of its being "communist controlled". Communists had played an active role in the organisation, and John Cox, its chairman from 1971 to 1977, was a member of the Communist Party of Great Britain. From the late 1970s, MI5 downgraded CND to "communist-penetrated".

In 1985, Massiter, who as an MI5 officer had been responsible for the surveillance of CND from 1981 to 1983, resigned and made disclosures to a Channel 4 20/20 Vision programme, "MI5's Official Secrets". She said that her work was determined more by the political importance of CND than by any security threat posed by subversive elements within it, and argued that the organisation was contravening the rules governing its practices.

In 1983, she analysed telephone intercepts on John Cox that gave her access to conversations with Joan Ruddock and Bruce Kent. MI5 also placed a spy, Harry Newton, in the CND office. According to Massiter, Newton believed that CND was controlled by extreme left-wing activists and that Bruce Kent might be a crypto-communist, but Massiter found no evidence to support either opinion. CND activist Pat Arrowsmith, who had known Newton for twenty-five years, disputed the veracity of Massiter's allegations against him. On the basis of Ruddock's contacts, she had given an interview to a Soviet newspaper in 1981, MI5 suspected her of being a communist sympathiser.

Massiter also revealed the surveillance of Harriet Harman and Patricia Hewitt, who had respectively held the posts of the legal officer and general secretary of the National Council for Civil Liberties.

Richard Norton-Taylor wrote in 2001 that Massiter's revelations in 1985 had never been officially challenged by the government, although British governments have a tradition of not commenting "on matters of national security and intelligence."
