= Leslie Woodhead =

British documentary filmmaker (1937–2026)

James Leslie John Woodhead, OBE (21 August 1937 – 26 June 2026) was a British documentary filmmaker.

== Life and career ==
James Leslie John Woodhead was born in Glasgow, Scotland on 21 August 1937. For his National Service commencing in 1956, he served in Fife at the Joint Services School for Linguists where he was taught Russian. He was posted to West Berlin to monitor the communications of Soviet pilots flying in and out of East Germany. "The experience I've come to realise since that it shaped my continuing obsession with what was going on in eastern Europe and particularly the Iron Curtain at that time."

As a young filmmaker, he was assigned to film a new rock 'n' roll band called The Beatles, playing at the Cavern Club in Liverpool. Woodhead first made his name as a reporter for Granada Television's flagship current affairs series World in Action. He remained with Granada for 28 years. Woodhead was among the first exponents of docudrama, a format which allowed him to explore daily life of those "behind the wall" during the Cold War, when journalists had little direct access. Among these were his films Invasion, about Soviet invasion and the Prague Spring of 1968, and Strike which deals with the rise of Solidarność in Poland. In 1999 his documentary film A Cry From The Grave, which documents, hour by hour, the atrocities of the Srebrenica massacre, won awards at four film festivals.

Woodhead went freelance in 1989. Since then, he has made a number of films for BBC's Storyville and Arena series – among them My Life as a Spy, Star Wars Dreams (a history of the American missile defence program). He has also worked with the Sundance channel, making Godless in America, a documentary about the life of Madalyn Murray O'Hair who founded American Atheists and successfully campaigned for the separation of church and state. He was appointed an OBE for services to television in 1994. In 2006, he was nominated for an Emmy for his HBO documentary Children of Beslan about the Beslan school hostage crisis.

Woodhead died on 26 June 2026, aged 88.

== Partial filmography ==
- 2019: Ella Fitzgerald: Just One of Those Things (Director)
- 2013: The Day Kennedy Died (Writer/Director)
- 2012: The Hunt for Bin Laden (Writer/Director)
- 2011: 9/11: The Day that Changed the World (Director/Producer)
- 2009: How the Beatles Rocked the Kremlin (Director)
- 2006: Saving Jazz (Director)
- 2005: Children of Beslan (Director/Producer)
- 2004: The Russian Newspaper Murders (Executive Producer)
- 2003: Star Wars Dreams (Director/Producer)
- 2002: Media by Milosevic (Director)
- 2001: NOVA: Russia's Nuclear Warriors (Director/Producer/Screenwriter)
- 2000: Tony Bennett's New York (Director/Producer)
- 2000: NOVA: Holocaust on Trial (Director/Screenwriter)
- 1998: Endurance (Director)
- 1991: The Tragedy of Flight 103: The Inside Story (Director)

== Awards and nominations ==
- 1974: BAFTA nomination for Factual Programme for The Year Of The Torturer
- 1986: BAFTA Desmond Davis Award
- 1994: OBE for services to television
- 1999: Biarritz International Festival Special Jury Award for A Cry from the Grave
- 2000: Silver FIPA award for A Cry from the Grave
- 2006: Emmy nomination for Outstanding Directing for Nonfiction Programming for Children of Beslan, BAFTA nomination for Flaherty Documentary Award for Children of Beslan
- 2012: Lifetime Achievement Award at the Aldeburgh Documentary Festival, BAFTA nomination for Single Documentary for 9/11: The Day That Changed The World
- 2014: BAFTA nomination for Single Documentary for The Day Kennedy Died
