= ITV Granada =

Channel 3 regional service for North West England

- Logo used since 2013

- The ITV Granada region
- Type: Region of television network
- Branding: ITV1
- Country: United Kingdom; Isle of Man
- First air date: 3 May 1956; 70 years ago
- TV transmitters: Winter Hill; (formerly Emley Moor)
- Headquarters: MediaCityUK, Salford, Greater Manchester; (previously Granada Studios, Manchester)
- Broadcast area: Cheshire; Greater Manchester; Lancashire; Merseyside; Derbyshire (High Peak area); Staffordshire (Stoke-on-Trent area); Shropshire (Oswestry area); Cumbria (Furness area); North East Wales (Flintshire, central Wrexham, coastal Denbighshire, Conwy east of Llandudno); North Yorkshire (Craven District); Isle of Man (1965-2009: ITV Border); (Before 1968, Yorkshire on weekdays)
- Owner: ITV plc; (formerly Granada plc from 1954 to 2004)
- Dissolved: Lost on-air identity on 27 October 2002 (now known as ITV1 at all times)
- Former names: Granada Television
- Picture format: 1080i HDTV, downscaled to 576i for SDTV
- Affiliation: ITV
- Official website: itv.com/granada
- Language: English
- Replaced: ABC Weekend TV at weekends from 1968
- Replaced by: Yorkshire Television in Yorkshire from 1968

ITV Granada, formerly known as Granada Television, is the ITV franchisee for the North West of England and the Isle of Man. From 1956 to 1968, it broadcast to both the north west and Yorkshire on weekdays only, because ABC Weekend Television was its weekend counterpart. Granada's parent company, Granada plc, later bought several other regional ITV stations and, in 2004, merged with Carlton Communications to form ITV plc.

Granada Television was particularly noted by critics for the distinctive northern and "social realism" character of many of its network programmes, as well as the high quality of its drama and documentaries. In its prime as an independent franchisee, prior to its parent company merging with Carlton Communications to form ITV plc, it was the largest Independent Television producer in the UK, accounting for 25% of the total broadcasting output of the ITV network.

Granada Television was founded by Sidney Bernstein at Granada Studios on Quay Street in Manchester and is the only surviving franchisee of the original four Independent Television Authority franchisees from 1954. It covers Cheshire, Greater Manchester, Lancashire, Merseyside, and parts of Derbyshire, Staffordshire, Cumbria, and North Yorkshire. In 2009, the Isle of Man was transferred to Granada from ITV Border.

Broadcasting by Granada Television began on 3 May 1956 under the North of England weekday franchise, the fifth franchise to go to air. It was marked by a distinctive northern identity and used a stylised letter "G" logo forming an arrow pointing north, often with the tagline "Granada: from the North". Granada plc merged with Carlton Communications to form ITV plc in 2004 after a duopoly had developed over the previous decade. The Granada name, as with those of the other former regional licence holders, is only referenced onscreen during regional news bulletins and the weeknight regional news magazine; ITV Broadcasting Limited operates the service with national ITV branding and continuity.

The North West region is regarded as ITV's most successful franchise. Nine Granada programmes were listed in the BFI TV 100 in 2000. Some of its most notable programmes include Sherlock Holmes, Coronation Street, Seven Up!, The Royle Family, The Jewel in the Crown, Crown Court, Cold Feet, Prime Suspect, Cracker, Brideshead Revisited, World in Action, University Challenge, Stars in Their Eyes and The Krypton Factor. Notable employees have included Paul Greengrass, Michael Apted, Mike Newell, Jeremy Isaacs, Andy Harries, Russell T Davies, Leslie Woodhead, Tony Wilson, Roland Joffe, Brian Cosgrove, Mark Hall, Brian Trueman, Michael Parkinson, Derek Granger and Gordon McDougall.

== History ==
=== Origins ===
The Granada region before franchise changes in 1968

Granada originated as Granada Theatres Ltd, which owned cinemas in the south of England. It was founded in Dover in 1930 by Sidney Bernstein and his brother Cecil; it was named after the Spanish city of Granada, which Sidney had visited on a holiday. The company was incorporated as Granada Ltd in 1934 and listed on the London Stock Exchange in 1935; Granada Theatres Ltd became a subsidiary of the new company.

In the 1950s, the Bernsteins became involved in commercial television, a competitor to the cinema chains, through the launch of ITV. Bernstein bid for the North of England franchise, which he believed would not affect the company's largely southern-based cinema chain. In 1954, the Independent Television Authority (ITA) awarded Granada the North of England contract for Monday to Friday, with ABC Weekend TV serving the same area on weekends. The companies used the ITA's Winter Hill and Emley Moor transmitters, covering Lancashire and the West and East Ridings of Yorkshire, including the major conurbations around Liverpool, Manchester, Leeds, Bradford, Sheffield, York and Doncaster.

The north and London were the two biggest regions. Granada preferred the north because of its tradition of home-grown culture, and because it offered a chance to start a new creative industry away from the metropolitan atmosphere of London … the north is a closely knit, indigenous, industrial society; a homogeneous cultural group with a good record for music, theatre, literature and newspapers, not found elsewhere in this island, except perhaps in Scotland. Compare this with London and its suburbs — full of displaced persons. And, of course, if you look at a map of the concentration of population in the north and a rainfall map, you will see that the north is an ideal place for television".

— Sidney Bernstein on why he decided to form Granada Television in Manchester in 1954

Bernstein selected a base from Leeds and Manchester. Granada executive Victor Peers believed Manchester was the preferred choice even before executives toured the region to find a suitable site. Granada Studios, designed by architect Ralph Tubbs, was built on a site on Quay Street in Manchester city centre belonging to Manchester City Council, which the company bought for £82,000.

The opening night featured Meet The People hosted by Quentin Reynolds and comedian Arthur Askey. Reynolds became inebriated before the broadcast and had to sober up.

Granada Television was broadcast by the ITA on VHF Channel 9 (405 lines, monochrome) from the Winter Hill transmitter starting on 3 May 1956, and from 3 November 1956 on VHF channel 10 (405 lines, monochrome) from the Emley Moor transmitter. The weekend programme service was provided by ABC Television covering both the North and Midlands regions. Following the 1968 franchise awards, Granada Television provided the programme service from Winter Hill for all seven days of the week but lost the seven-day service from Emley Moor to Yorkshire Television. With the national launch of the UHF 625 line colour television service for both BBC1 and ITV on 15 November 1969, the ITA commenced broadcasts of Granada Television on UHF channel 59 from Winter Hill, with high power relays subsequently put into service at Pendle Forest (channel 25 on 2 August 1971, the first UHF relay service to be operated by the ITA), Lancaster (channel 24 on 26 June 1972), Storeton (channel 25 in September 1979), and Saddleworth (channel 49 on 28 June 1984).

=== Early years ===
Most ITV franchisees viewed their territories as stopgaps before winning a coveted London franchise. In contrast, Granada determined to develop a strong northern identity – northern voices, northern programmes, northern idents with phrases such as Granada from the north, From the north — Granada and Granadaland. Bernstein refused to employ anyone not prepared to live in or travel to Manchester and Jeremy Isaacs called him a "genial tyrant" as a result.

I think that what Manchester sees today, London will see eventually.

— Sidney Bernstein on his hopes that Granada would eventually develop as a key player in British broadcasting in the 1950s.

Bernstein decided to build new studios rather than hiring space or converting old buildings, an approach favoured by the other ITV companies and by the BBC at its original Manchester studios. The investment in new studios in 1954 contributed to Granada struggling financially, and the company was close to insolvency by late 1956. All four ITA franchisees were expected to make losses in the first few years of operation, but Granada's was a significant sum of £175,000 (nearly £3.5m in 2011). When it first became profitable, it had the lowest profits of the quartet.

Granada sought the help of Associated-Rediffusion, the London weekday station, which agreed to underwrite Granada's debts in exchange for a percentage of its profits, without the consent of the ITA, who would have blocked it. Granada accepted the deal, but the popularity of ITV increased and profitability followed. Analysts questioned how Associated-Rediffusion, ABC and ATV were making annual profits of up to £2.7m by 1959 and yet Granada's profits were under £1m. With the increase in income, Granada tried to renegotiate the contract; Associated-Rediffusion refused, souring relations for many years. The deal was worth over £8m to Rediffusion. By the early 1960s Granada was established and its soap opera Coronation Street quickly became popular, as did inexpensive game shows such as Criss Cross Quiz and University Challenge.

=== Franchise changes ===
In the 1968 franchise round, Granada's contract was changed from weekdays across the northern England region to the whole week in the North West from Winter Hill transmitting station. Yorkshire was defined as a separate region and the contract awarded to Yorkshire Television, broadcasting from Emley Moor transmitting station; its transmissions could be received in parts of North Lincolnshire. Bernstein was angered by the decision to split "Granadaland", and claimed he would appeal to the United Nations. Granada Television was received in what is now Greater Manchester, Lancashire, Merseyside and Cheshire, the south of what is now Cumbria (then Lancashire, and smaller parts of Westmorland and Yorkshire) around Barrow-in-Furness, the High Peak district of Derbyshire (Glossop, Buxton), the Staffordshire Moorlands district of Staffordshire (Biddulph and Leek) and the Isle of Man. Part of North Wales can receive only the Winter Hill transmissions (i.e. Granada) rather than HTV.

Granada retained its franchise in the 1980 franchise review, and invested in multimillion-pound dramatic serial productions such as The Jewel in the Crown and Brideshead Revisited. By the late 1990s the UK commercial broadcasters were considered too small to compete in the global market, and the ITV franchises began to consolidate with the aim of creating a single company with a larger budget.

The Broadcasting Act of 1990 instigated the 1991 franchise auction round, in which companies had to bid for the regions. Mersey Television, a company producing the Channel 4 soap opera Brookside, bid £35m compared to Granada's £9m but Granada won as Mersey's package did not meet the 'quality threshold' applied by the Independent Television Commission. This requirement disadvantaged companies with no previous franchise experience. Granada owned popular television series such as Coronation Street, which it threatened to sell to satellite TV if the franchise was lost. The government responded by relaxing the regulatory regime, so that ITV contractors could take over other companies, and Granada bought several companies. Some at the company considered ITV could survive only as a single merged entity to have sufficient resources to produce big-budget programmes, a concern that increased when BSkyB began to take ITV's viewing share, leading to less advertising revenue, the source of ITV's income.

David Plowright, who had worked at Granada since 1957, resigned in 1992, citing the arrival of Gerry Robinson, who had tightened departmental budgets with an uncompromising business approach. Plowright had been the company's driving force, producing programmes such as World in Action and Coronation Street, and promoting the Granada Studios Tour. His departure angered well-known media-industry figures; John Cleese sent Robinson a fax using "vitriolic language" that called him an "upstart caterer" (a reference to his past employment). John Birt, Harold Pinter and Alan Bennett all supported Plowright for his quality programming.

=== Takeover bids ===
The so-called "Big Five" ITV franchisees, Thames, LWT, Central, Granada, and Yorkshire were expected to take over the ten smaller franchises. Granada wanted to consolidate with Yorkshire and Tyne Tees to "counter the potential dominance of the south east", and the prospect of being taken over by Thames. Granada made a hostile bid for LWT in December 1993, but LWT believed Granada had "little to offer" despite having three times the market capitalisation; Granada, however, completed the take-over in 1994. Granada continued to expand by acquiring Yorkshire-Tyne Tees Television for £652m in 1997 and bought UNM's television assets for £1.75 billion in 2000 – by which it acquired Anglia and Meridian and some divisions of HTV – the remaining divisions passing to rival company Carlton due to competition laws. A year later, it acquired Border from Capital Radio Group.

By 2002, Granada had established an effective duopoly of ITV with Carlton Television, owning all the ITV companies in England and Wales. The remaining franchises in Scotland, (Scottish and Grampian), UTV in Northern Ireland, and Channel in the Channel Islands, remained independent.

Granada was in a poor financial state and closed the Granada Studios Tour in 2001, citing decreasing visitor figures. The real reason was the decision to increase production of episodes for Coronation Street to five per week. Without access to that set, the highlight of the tour, the Granada Studios Tour venture was no longer viable. The company also closed Granada Film. The emergence of digital television cut ITV's viewing share, decreasing advertising revenue, which was already suffering from competition with the internet. The failure of ITV Digital cost Granada and Carlton losses estimated at over £1 billion reducing the company's value from 2001 to 2003.

=== ITV Granada and the unification of ITV ===
A 2001–2002 ident with the website for itv.com and the region's familiar logo

ITV Granada logo used from 2006 to 2013

On 28 October 2002, in a network-wide relaunch, Granada was rebranded as ITV1 Granada. The Granada name was shown before regional programmes, but this has ceased; its name has all but disappeared from screens, as have all other ITV regional identities. Since rebranding, all continuity announcements are made from London. The Granada logo appeared at the end of its own programmes until 31 October 2004. Granada was permitted by the government to merge with Carlton on 2 February 2004 to form ITV plc. The move was a takeover by Granada, whose market capitalisation was double that of Carlton, at nearly £2 billion. Granada owned 68% of the shares and Carlton 32%; chairman designate Michael Green was ousted by shareholders and the majority of new board members originated from Granada. Carlton employees were subsumed in Granada operations or made redundant, with three out of four new departments led by Granada staff.

From 1 November 2004, Granada productions were credited "Granada Manchester", the brand of the unified in-house production arm but on 21 September 2005, it was announced that Granada's name would no longer appear at the end of programmes. The in-house production arm was renamed ITV Productions. The change on 16 January 2006 coincided with a relaunch of ITV's on-screen graphics. Granada's name and logo were still used at the end of programmes made for other networks, such as University Challenge for BBC Two, and old programmes shown on BSkyB channels Sky One, and the former Sky Two (now Sky Replay) and Sky Three (now Sky Mix), until 2009.

On 13 November 2006, Granada lost its on-air identity when regional programming voiced ITV1 or ITV1 Granada over a generic ident. Local news coverage was branded Granada News except for the main 18.00 Granada Reports bulletin. Granada Reports' main rival is BBC North West Tonight, broadcast to roughly the same region. In 2009, ITV removed the Granada brand from all departments including its international production arm, Granada America which became ITV Studios America. End credits on programmes made at The Manchester Studios were credited to ITV Studios.

=== Present ===
ITV made cutbacks, dropping 600 jobs in 2009, which effectively closed the Yorkshire Television Leeds Studios; more redundancies were made in London, leaving Granada relatively unscathed. In the 2009 ITV regional news cutbacks, Granada was one of three regions unaffected by changes, except for extending its coverage area to include the Isle of Man, which had previously been served by ITV Border.

ITV is obliged by UK communications regulator Ofcom to produce 50% of its programmes outside London, something it failed to achieve in 2007 and 2008. With this obligation, retaining Manchester as the northern hub, and an £80m move to MediaCityUK on 25 March 2013, ITV appears to be committed to the Granada region for the foreseeable future.

== Studios ==
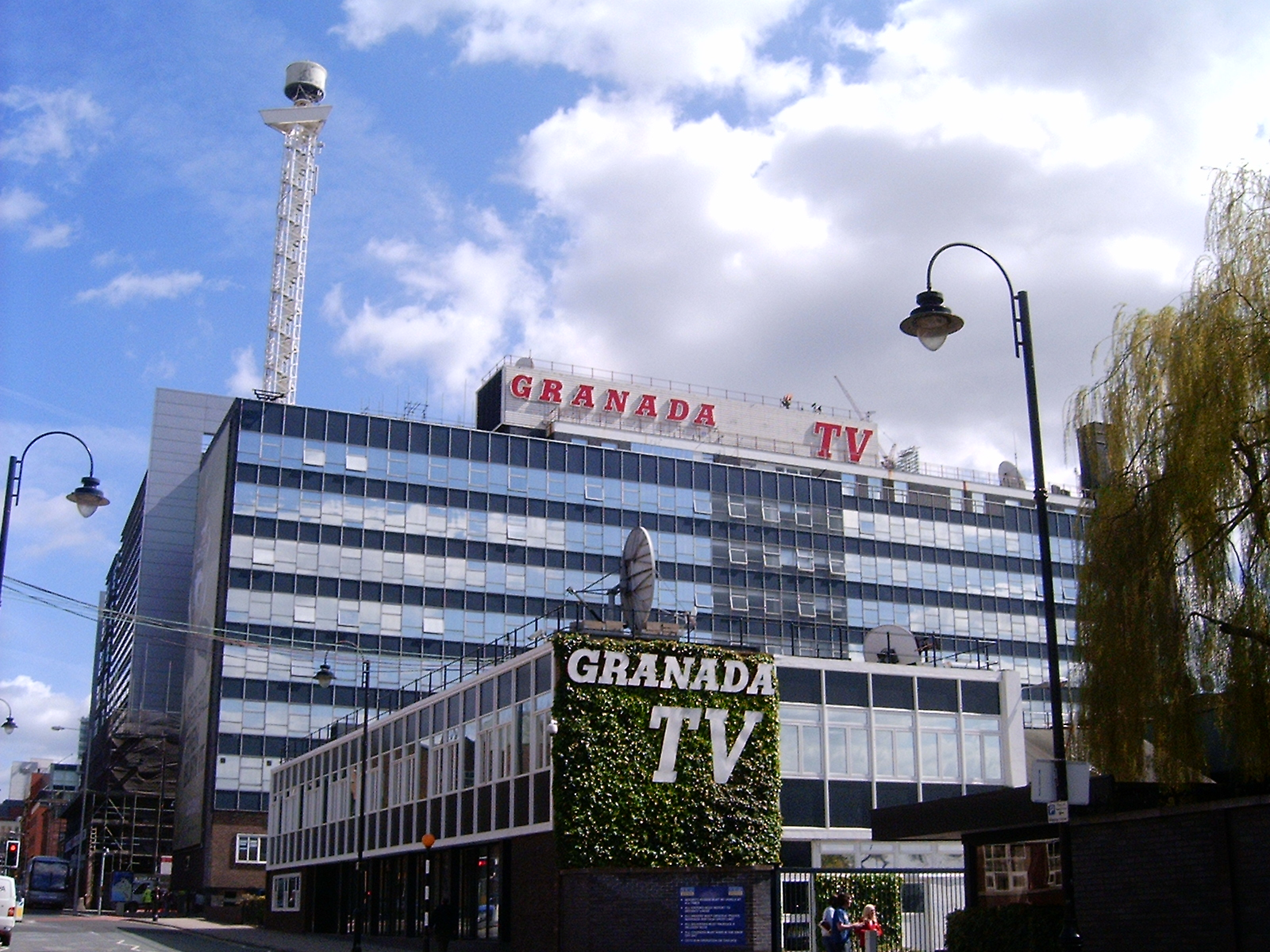
Granada Studios with the red logo and lattice broadcasting tower on the roof – both of which were removed

In the eighteen months between the award of the franchise and the start of transmission, Granada built a brand new studio complex on Quay Street. The site was reportedly previously a cemetery for pauper's graves, where 22,000 people were buried. An article in The Sun newspaper and an episode of the TV series Most Haunted seem to be the only sources for this claim in 2009. Twelve maps from between 1772 and 1960 show no evidence of a cemetery and buildings are shown on the bull china site from 1807. Part of the Manchester and Salford Junction Canal, which linked the River Irwell to the Rochdale Canal from 1839 to 1922, ran in a tunnel underneath the site. The studios pre-dated BBC Television Centre by four years and were the first purpose-built television studios in the United Kingdom.

Bernstein exaggerated the scale of the studios, to make Granada appear a rival to the BBC, and gave the studios only even numbers so that it appeared there were twelve despite there only being six. The studios were operated by 3sixtymedia, ITV Studios' joint-venture company with BBC Resources Ltd from 2000. The studios later hosted shows displaced by the proposed closure of the Yorkshire Television studios in Leeds in 2009, including Channel 4's Countdown.

In September 2010, the noted 1950s red landmark "Granada TV" sign on the roof and entrance of Granada Studios on Quay Street was removed for safety reasons after maintenance found it was badly corroded. The Museum of Science and Industry (MOSI) now owns the sign, deeming it important to Manchester's cultural heritage.

=== Relocation ===
After the ITV merger in 2004, the possibility of selling the Quay Street site was considered, with staff, studios and offices moved into the adjacent bonded warehouse building. ITV anticipated the BBC would buy the land but the BBC opted to move to the Peel Group's MediaCityUK development in Salford Quays. ITV considered relocating to Trafford Wharf across the Manchester Ship Canal from the BBC at MediaCityUK. Discussions continued for several years and an agreement in principle was reached in 2008. In March 2009, in the recession, Granada announced it would remain at Quay Street, but after a change of management, talks resumed in January 2010. Two years later, on 16 December 2010, Granada announced it would move to the Orange Building in MediaCityUK alongside the University of Salford. It planned to build a studio to produce Coronation Street on the opposite bank of the ship canal on Trafford Wharf. Planning permission was granted, and building work began on 6 September 2011 with the goal of completion in 2012. ITV Granada moved to MediaCityUK on 25 March 2013.

== Identity ==
Throughout its history, Granada Television used the logo of an arrow pointing northwards in idents, often accompanied by the tagline "from the North". Sidney Bernstein wanted to present a northern identity. Granada Television was considered "bolder", "gritty" and more "Socialist" in its identity than the other more "sedate" and "Conservative" ITV franchisees and the BBC, and placed great emphasis displaying the northern style which distinguished it from them. Bernstein believed the north had "untapped creative energy" that needed cultivation.

Granada was one of the few regions that did not play the national anthem at closedown.

In 1958, two years after its launch, Granada Television's northern style was apparent. Kenneth Clark, of the ITA, which let the franchise, remarked: "We did not quite foresee how much Granada Television would develop a character which distinguishes it most markedly from the other programmes companies and from the BBC." Peter Salmon, of the BBC said: "Granada Television made TV programmes in the north west; for northerners, reflecting northern culture and attitudes."

=== Idents ===
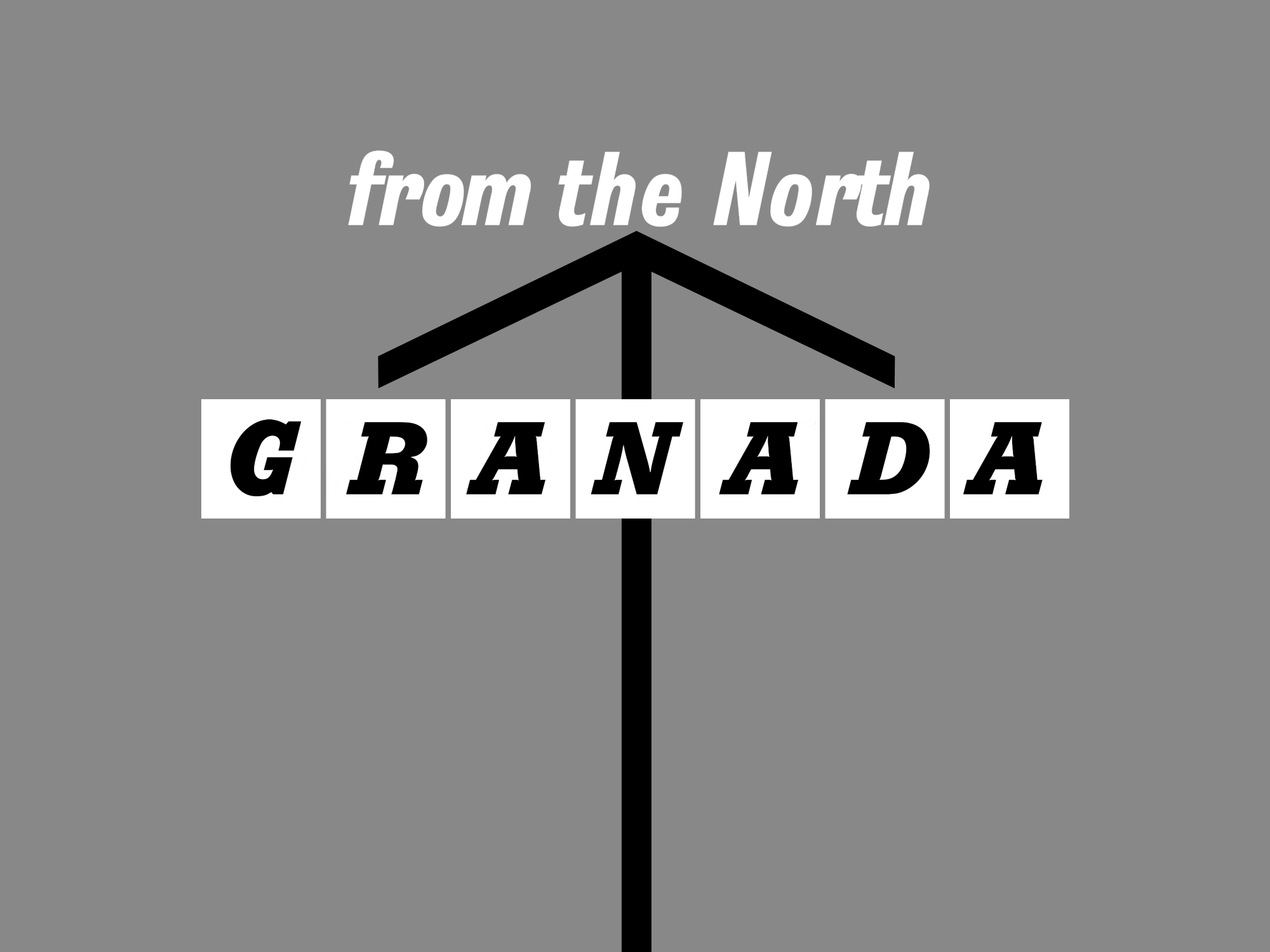
Granada's arrow TV ident from 1956–1968

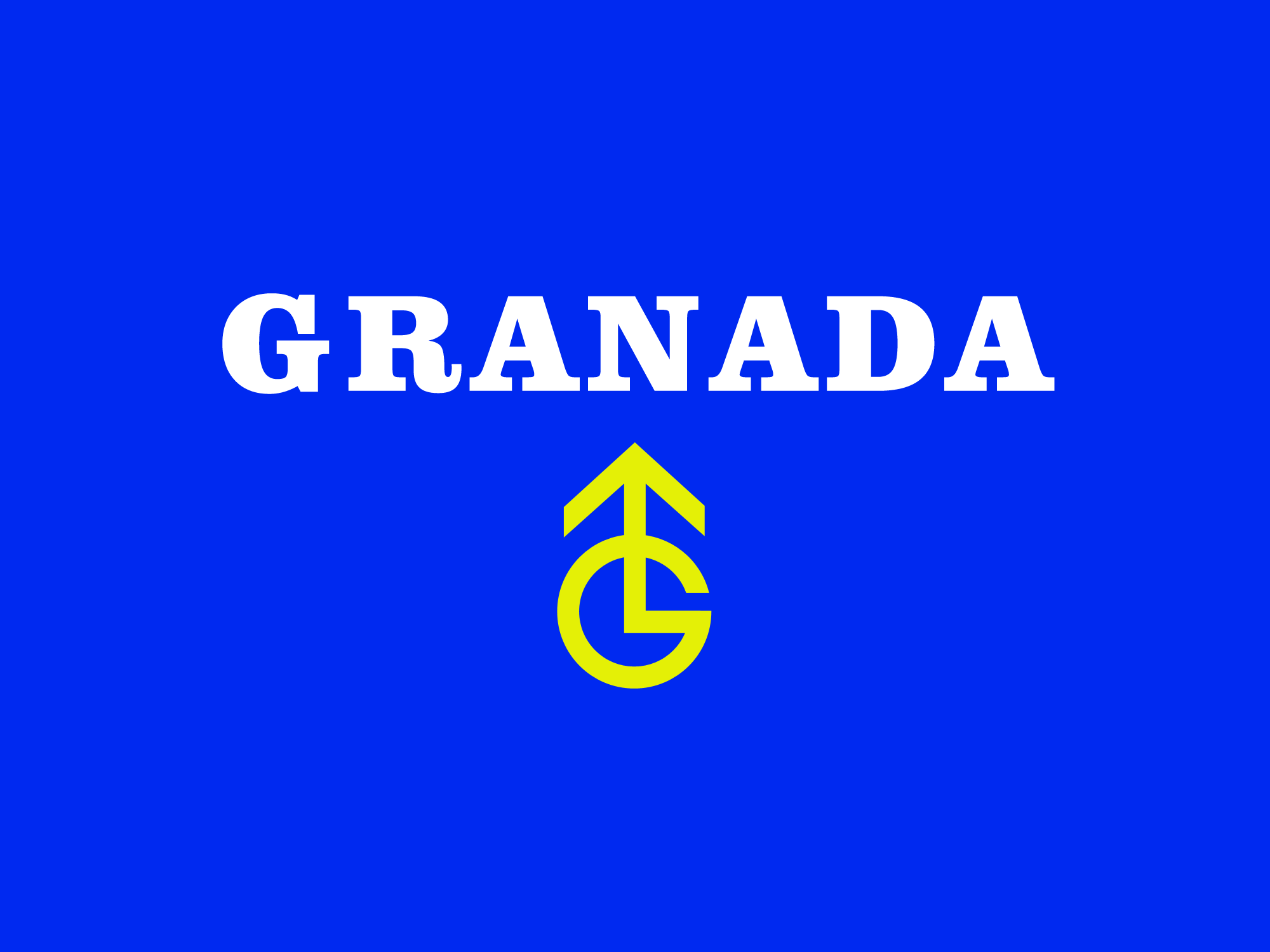
The Granada TV ident with the pointed G symbol, in use from 1969 to 1989

A Granada TV ident with the pointed G symbol against a stripe, used from 1990 to 1995

From its launch in 1956 the channel used captions and animations featuring a thin arrow pointing upwards and Granada, in a stylised font, in boxes. The arrow pointed at the "N" in Granada, pointing north and sometimes animated revealing the slogan "from the North", before the Granada name.

When Granada's franchise area was reduced in 1968, an ident featuring the word "GRANADA" between two horizontal lines was introduced. After this was phased out in the first half of 1969, the famous pointed "G" logo, incorporating the upward/Northward facing arrow used previously into a letter "G" was introduced. This was to be the corporate logo for the Granada Group as a whole (also seen as the logo for Granada's TV rentals firm), so it was introduced to their ITV franchise as a matter of course rather than the ITV franchise choosing to adopt the new branding. This logo was originally white on a grey background (although occasionally seen as black on a white background) but after the introduction of colour, grey was replaced with blue (after a short period of using white symbol/yellow lettering/purple background), with the "GRANADA" name in white and the G symbol in yellow.

A colour emblem was used from the 1970s until it was replaced by a series of idents to celebrate Granada Television's 30th anniversary on 3 May 1986, when it was a computer-animated pointed "G" against a graded background and a cake covered in candles in the pointed G shape. On 1 September 1986, Granada Television reverted to using a caption featuring a gold or chrome 3D pointed "G" on a graded blue background. Granada Television used in-vision continuity featuring northern personalities giving messages. It was common for the logo to be seen for a few seconds after the continuity before the programme, and continuity was rarely given over the symbol.

On 1 September 1989, Granada Television launched a look featuring a translucent pointed G, which rotated into place in time to the music against a natural scene. When the first ITV generic look was launched, Granada Television refused to adopt it, because the Granada Television logo was incorrectly inserted into the "V" segment of the logo, with the line connecting the "G" and the arrow not being added entirely. The company used a version with its translucent logo shown at the beginning, before continuing with the generic ident and ending with the generic ITV logo.

On 4 June 1990, Granada Television, in the run-up to the 1990 franchise round, relaunched its on-screen branding to a blue stripe descending from the top of the screen, containing the pointed "G", against a plain white background accompanied by the same music as previously. Variations were seen from which the stripe formed from a falling feather or was backlit. On 2 May 1992, the stripe descended to reveal a rainbow of colours before becoming the usual blue and this ident stays on screen until 1 January 1995.

On 3 January 1994, Granada Television introduced a series of films featuring flags with its logo against various scenes in the region, accompanied by the slogan 'Setting the Standard'. These introduced local programming, Granada Reports, or promotions.

On 2 January 1995, the stripe theme was modified; the pointed "G" was larger on the blue stripe against a computer generated multicoloured background and the "G" was created by filming a large perspex "G" with motion control photography. This ident was used, from a variety of angles, until 7 November 1999, by which point additional idents based on surreal surroundings, such as a fish blowing a bubble with a G inside, which floated to the surface, or a camera zoom into the eye of a housewife to reveal the G in her eye, were introduced on 2 September 1996.

All of the idents were replaced on 8 November 1999 when Granada Television took the generic hearts idents. Granada Television kept the pointed G logo, made slightly thinner and placed in a box at the top of the screen. The dual branding of Granada Television and ITV lasted until 28 October 2002, when regional identities were dropped in favour of the new ITV1 channel brand. The celebrities ident package featured plain ITV1 idents for all national programmes, and Granada Television placed under the ITV1 logo for regional programmes. This practice continued until 13 November 2006, when no name was used, and Granada Productions was replaced with ITV Productions on programme end boards starting ten months earlier. The Granada Television logo continued on end boards until 31 October 2004. The Granada name was used on announcements before local programming over a generic ITV1 ident until all non-news regional programming was scrapped.

On 14 January 2013, ITV1 reverted to its original name of ITV, along with all other ITV plc-owned franchises.

During the early days, the pointed G logo was used on two other subsidiary businesses. Firstly came the Red Arrow Television Rental chain. During the days when many families preferred to rent their TV sets to offset poor reliability and changing fashions, and due to the high price of television receivers, this company fared well alongside the established "heavy hitters" such as Radio Rentals. The company's opening promotion was to give every new customer a small, Hiawatha-style figurine to stand on top of their new TV set. Upon its success, the name was later changed to Granada TV Rental. Based on the results of this company, Granada Television dipped its toes into the office furniture rental business, and carpet sales and fitting for larger business customers, with Black Arrow. This business was less successful.

== Programmes ==
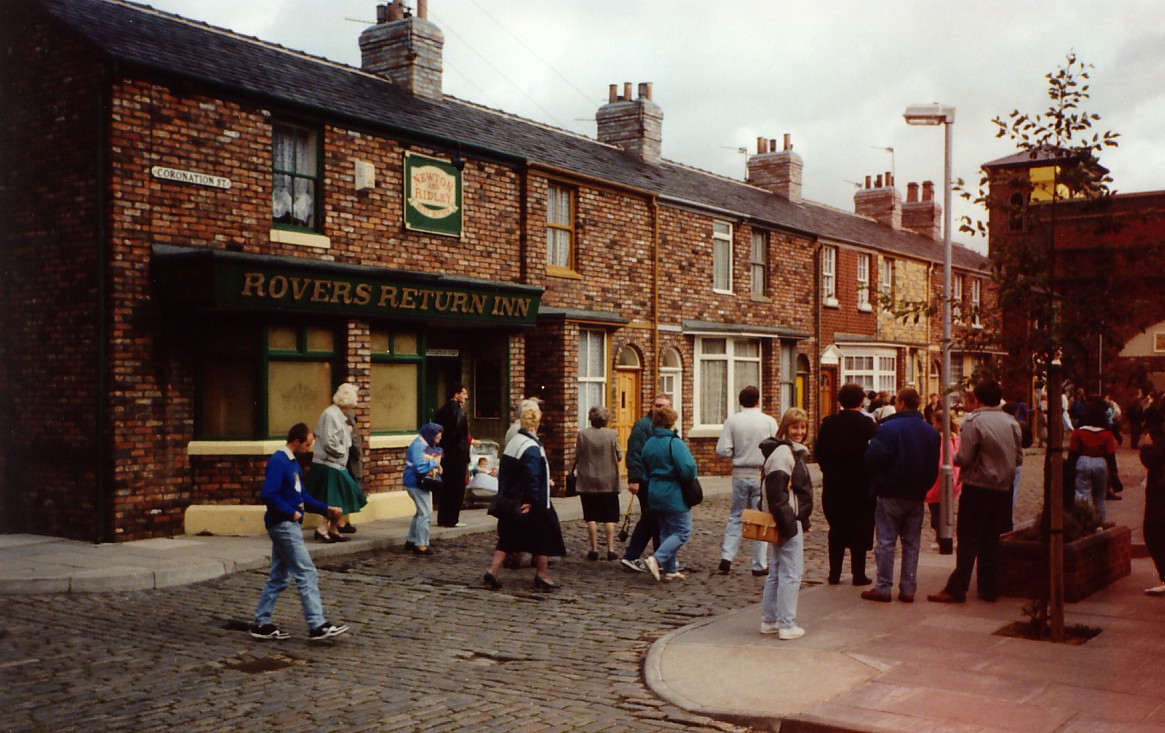
The Coronation Street set at the Granada Studios Tour

Granada was among the "Big Four" and later "Big Five" franchises that provided much of the ITV schedule. In 1958, Granada broadcast coverage of the 1958 Rochdale by-election, the first election to be covered on television in Britain. Granada's coverage was broad in scope, and it also broadcast two candidate debates. Over 50 years later, Granada Studios hosted the first General Election debate among the leaders of the three main political parties.

Granada's boldness was seen in ambitious documentaries such as Seven Up!, which premiered in 1964. The programme was a social experiment which followed the lives of 14 British children aged seven. It tracked their lives at seven-year intervals to discover whether their hopes and aspirations had been achieved. The documentary was voted the greatest ever by esteemed filmmakers and its final instalment, 70 Up, premiered in September 2026. Seven Up was part of the World in Action documentary series between 1963 and 1998, which won awards but was controversial. It garnered a reputation for hard-hitting investigative journalism and its producer Gus Macdonald commented that the programme was "born brash". Paul Greengrass said that David Plowright told him, "don't forget, your job's to make trouble." World in Action demonstrated hard-hitting investigative journalism and explored issues such as police corruption at the Metropolitan Police in 1985 and the Royal Family's tax loophole in 1991. The programme led a campaign to prove the innocence of the Birmingham Six in 1985 when researcher Chris Mullin questioned the convictions; by 1991 the men had been released from prison.

The classic northern working-class soap opera Coronation Street began a thirteen-week, twice weekly regional run of half-hour episodes on 9 December 1960. It is still produced at the rate of 3 one-hour peak-time episodes a week after over sixty years, and is the longest-running television soap opera in the world. Such set-pieces as Siege Week and the 2010 Tram Crash were filmed at the studio. The company also produced gritty drama series such as A Family at War (1970–72), set during the Second World War.

Granada produced The Stars Look Down (1975), Laurence Olivier Presents (1976–78), Brideshead Revisited (1981), the multi-award-winning Disappearing World series (between 1969 and 1993) and, from 1984, The Adventures of Sherlock Holmes and The Jewel in the Crown for an international audience. These shows were sold overseas by Granada Television International.

Another flagship programme, the long-running quiz show, University Challenge was originally aired between 1962 and 1987. It was revived by the BBC in 1994 but still produced by Granada. The company produced The Krypton Factor between 1977 and 1995 (revived by ITV in 2009). One of Granada's longest-running programmes, What The Papers Say, was broadcast by Granada in 1956, was taken over by the BBC in the early 1990s, and later by Channel 4. The programme introduced the idea of discussing what the newspapers were reporting, continued by Sunday Supplement and The Wright Stuff. In the 1970s, Granada produced situation comedies, often based around life in the north-west, including Nearest and Dearest, The Lovers and The Cuckoo Waltz, followed by The Brothers McGregor and Watching in the 1980s.

Granada drew on 1970s pop music with shows such as Lift Off with Ayshea and the Bay City Rollers show, Shang-a-lang. Granada's So It Goes was presented by Tony Wilson and showcased the punk phenomenon, bringing the Sex Pistols and the Clash to TV screens. The station also produced Marc, presented by glam rock star Marc Bolan. The show was in production when Bolan was killed in a car accident in 1977. Granada produced Allsorts from 1989 to 1995 for CITV, featuring Wayne Jackman, Andrew Wightman (who later produced Granada's talent show Stars in Their Eyes), Virginia Radcliffe, Jane Cox and Julie Westwood.

Granada Studios produced The Weekenders (1992), a surreal comedy episode featuring Vic Reeves and Bob Mortimer.

== Significant broadcasters ==
Denis Forman, chairman 1974-87, and David Plowright, chairman 1987–92, were the executives who led Granada Television during its most successful years. Forman and Plowright have been described as embodying the Granada outlook, which was "non-conformist, alternative, non-London".

Granada Television introduced many broadcasters to British television, and a number of its directors, producers and writers went on to create their own production companies. Some have been recognised for their achievements in British television with honours such as knighthoods, while others achieved senior posts such as Director-General of the BBC. Jeremy Isaacs developed a significant portion of Granada's factual programming, and the company produced a generation of major British TV "players" including John Birt, later Director-General of the BBC, and Gus Macdonald, his fellow World in Action producer. Many began work as researchers on World in Action.

Directors, producers and writers

- Paul Abbott is a former scriptwriter who created State of Play and Shameless.
- Jim Allen, a prolific socialist playwright best known for his collaborations with Ken Loach, contributed scripts to Coronation Street from 1965 to 1967.
- Michael Apted began his television career at Granada and stayed for over twenty years. He devised the Up series documentary.
- John Birt, Baron Birt began his career at Granada in 1966 as a researcher for World in Action before leaving in 1971. He became Director-General of the BBC from 1992 to 2000.
- Russell T Davies collaborated with Paul Abbott as a writer in the 1990s.
- Bill Gilmour was a drama director.
- Paul Greengrass was a director of current affairs program World in Action in the 1980s before becoming a film director.
- Andy Harries was researcher before starting his television career on World in Action, and worked in various roles until the 2000s.
- Tom Hooper directed two episodes of Cold Feet and directed Helen Mirren in Prime Suspect before becoming a film director.
- Jeremy Isaacs joined Granada in 1968, where he supervised production of World in Action and What the Papers Say.
- Brian Lapping produced major political and historical documentary series, including End of Empire.
- Gus Macdonald joined Granada in 1967 and went on to edit World in Action, leaving in 1986.
- Kay Mellor worked with Paul Abbott on Children's Ward and wrote other drama serials, such as Strictly Confidential and Between the Sheets.
- Norma Percy produced political and historical documentaries, working with Brian Lapping.
- Jack Rosenthal was a prolific playwright producing The Dustbinmen and The Lovers.
- Nicola Shindler was a script-writer on Cracker in 1993 before forming the Red Production Company.

Presenters

- Gordon Burns joined in 1972 and presented Granada Reports, World in Action and The Krypton Factor. He later joined BBC North West in 1999 to present North West Tonight, where he became the programme's main anchor from then until 2011.
- Sacha Baron Cohen had a chatshow, F2F on Granada Talk TV in 1996.
- Richard Madeley joined Granada in 1982 where he met Judy Finnigan, who joined as a researcher in 1972.
- Lucy Meacock was Granada's news presenter between 1988 and 2024, and was previously an occasional presenter for the ITV national news.
- Michael Parkinson began his television career at Granada Television.
- Tony Wilson presented Granada Reports and music programmes that promoted Manchester music, which gave him the nickname 'Mr Manchester'.
- Gamal Fahnbulleh presents Granada Reports.

== Other ventures ==
=== Granada Studios Tour ===
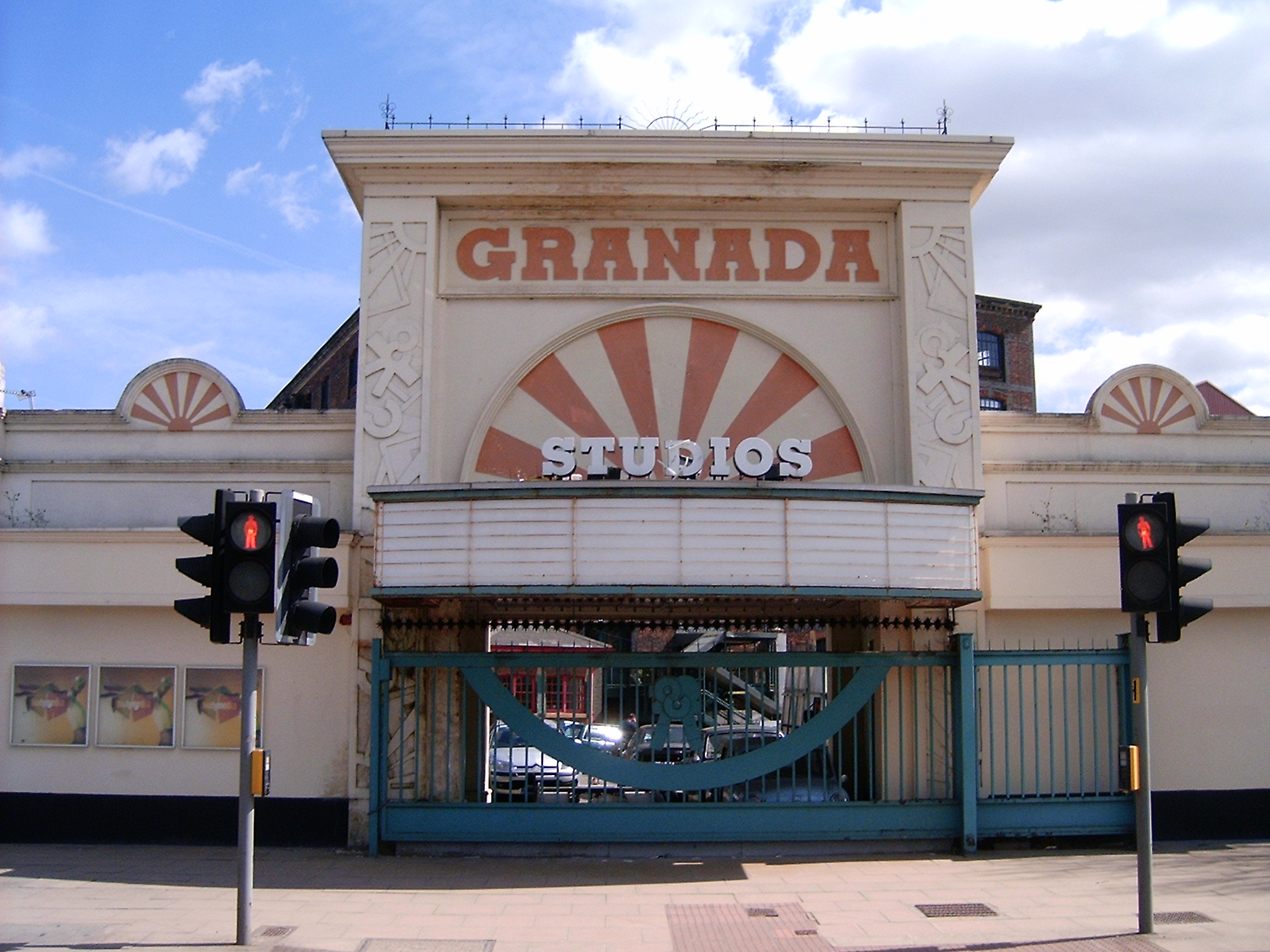
Entrance to Granada Studios Tour

The Granada Studios Tour opened in 1988 as an entertainment park on the Granada Studios Quay Street back lot, themed around television productions. The park featured a replica set of 10 Downing Street, and visitors were shown how television was produced at the time. The main feature was the set of Coronation Street.

=== G-Wizz ===
Several of Granada's programmes administered their websites using G-Wizz, including This Morning, Coronation Street and Emmerdale. Its Flash-heavy pages were mostly unusable by subscribers, who were then still largely modem-based, and take-up was low. Less than a year after it opened, Granada closed G-Wizz in March 2001, after it had cost the company £9 million. It combined the remainder of its online presence with fellow ITV company Carlton to launch itv.com.

=== Granada Sky Broadcasting ===
GSB's logo

In 1996 Granada joined BSkyB to form a joint venture, Granada Sky Broadcasting (GSB) providing content and new channels to the satellite platform. Granada launched a range of television channels broadcasting the Granada archive on the Sky satellite television platform and other digital platforms such as ITV Digital which closed in 2002 due to administration, NTL and Telewest (which merged to form Virgin Media). GSB operated as a joint venture until 2004 when ITV was formed. Consequently, ITV purchased BSkyB's 10% stake in the venture and launched ITV3, which replaced Granada Plus. GSB was renamed the ITV digital channels Ltd to reflect ITV plc control.

=== ONdigital ===
From 1997 until 2002 Granada and Carlton invested, and lost, over £1 billion with a joint venture into ONdigital, a pay-TV, digital terrestrial broadcaster. ONdigital was rebranded ITV Digital in summer 2001, but opposed by SMG plc, UTV, and Channel Television, who felt it would damage the ITV brand. ONdigital was expected to create a new revenue stream and be floated as a separate company but by March 1999 the service only had 110,000 subscribers, well below the 2 million Granada aimed for. Granada and Carlton persevered by rebranding the service ITV Digital but this too was not successful. Competition from Sky Digital launched in 1998 was too great and ITV Digital ceased broadcasting on 1 May 2002. This led to sweeping cuts in the organisation, including cutting budgets for flagship drama serials and productions and loss of jobs at the Manchester headquarters.

=== Additional channels ===
==== Granada Plus ====
Granada Plus was a general entertainment channel, a 50–50 joint venture between Granada Television and British Sky Broadcasting, aimed at older audiences using archive material. The channel, launched on 1 October 1996 as Granada Plus, was later known as G Plus and finally Plus. It broadcast until 1 November 2004, when ITV bought BSkyB's stake in GSB, and closed the channel, replacing it with ITV3, and taking Plus' low EPG position on Sky Digital.

==== Men & Motors ====
Men & Motors was a male-orientated channel which launched on the same day as Granada Plus, sharing transponder space with Plus and broadcasting for three hours a day in the late evening. In 2004 it became a full-time channel, broadcasting motors programming during the day and adult programming in the late evening although the adult programming was dropped when the channel went free-to-air in 2005. It lasted longest of all the channels, and ran until 2010, when it was closed to make way for ITV HD. Most of its programmes were transferred to ITV4.

==== Granada Breeze ====
Originally Granada Good Life, Granada Breeze was another GSB venture which also launched on 1 October 1996. It was a lifestyle channel aimed at women viewers and showed programmes on, cookery, health and US daytime television such as Judge Joe Brown. It provided programmes split into themed sections called Granada Talk Television, Granada Food and Wine, Granada Health and Beauty, Granada Television High Street and Granada Home and Garden. Most shows were presented from a large conservatory studio outside the Coronation Street studio which was later used for daytime ITV Play programming. Granada Breeze was scaled down in July 2001 before ceasing operation in March 2002 due to poor viewing figures.

==== Others ====
Wellbeing was a joint venture with Boots, modelled on Granada Breeze, and was broadcast from The Leeds Studios, although Granada made some programmes, closed in 2003.

Granada Talk TV focused on chat shows and closed after less than a year on air.

Shop!, launched in 1998, was a partnership between Granada and Littlewoods. However, its closure was announced in 2002.

== Reception ==
=== Awards and accolades ===
Granada Television had a reputation for strong production values. In 1999, Granada Television made eight of ITV's top-rated programmes and 30% of the UK's top-rated programmes came from its studios and in 2005 supplied 63% of ITV original production. It was the only ITA broadcaster created in 1954 that survived into the 21st century, and it flourished until it emerged as the dominant player in the ITV network by 2000.

In the nineteen BAFTA Awards for the Best Drama series awarded since 1992, Granada Television has won five in total, Cracker twice in 1994 and 1995, Cold Feet in 2002 and The Street in 2007 and 2008 – more than any other production company.

Coronation Street became the longest-running serial soap in 2010 when it celebrated its 50th anniversary, and the Seven Up documentary series was voted the greatest documentary in a Channel 4 programme by film makers.

==== Criticisms of perceived Manchester-centric bias ====
In three franchise rounds (1967, 1980, and 1991) three groups (Palatine Television, Merseyvision, and Mersey Television, wherein the latter two were unconnected) each made audacious bids to rid Granada (and in 1967, ABC) of its franchise, but were unsuccessful, given that Granada was well respected (second only to the BBC). The opponents claimed to the regulatory bodies that existed at the time (the ITA in 1967, the IBA in 1981, and the ITC in 1991) in these successive franchise rounds that Granada was too Manchester-centric at the expense of the Liverpool area and need to cater for the whole of north west England. They were supported by the fact that Granada Television was frequently referred to as "Granada Manchester" instead of "Granada North West", as most productions were made in Manchester and in 2005 Granada and Manchester City Council held a celebration recognising Granada's 50th anniversary, cementing this perception further. In 1993, Brian Sedgemore MP complained that promises Granada made during the 1991 franchise round to open offices in Chester, Lancaster and Blackburn were not fulfilled, but David Liddiment at Granada did not believe this assertion to be true.

Granada had increased investment in Liverpool moving its regional news service to the Albert Dock complex in 1986, before moving back to Quay Street sometime in the early 2000s.

The daytime show This Morning broadcast from Liverpool's Albert Dock for many years before it moved to the London Studios in 1996, as it was difficult to get celebrity guests to travel from London to Liverpool.

==== Criticisms and controversies over World in Action and Tonight ====
Granada's bold, hard-hitting television and documentaries resulted in a number of legal cases. David Plowright told junior researcher Paul Greengrass that Granada's role was to "make trouble". World in Action was hard-hitting but resulted in expensive libel trials when false accusations were made in the 1990s.

In 1998 Granada paid £2 million, in two cases, to three Metropolitan Police officers who were wrongly accused of covering up a murder and Marks and Spencer for alleging M&S knew one of its suppliers was using child labour. World in Action was axed in 1998 and replaced by the Tonight programme in 1999. Tonight was also criticised, but this time for dumbing down, as it was markedly less hard-hitting.

Nevertheless, Tonight had occasionally stirred controversy like its predecessor. An example is the 2003 documentary Living with Michael Jackson (a Tonight special). Its airing resulted in the threat of legal action by Michael Jackson. The documentary gained an audience of fifteen million in the United Kingdom, and newspapers depicted Jackson in a negative light following the documentary. Jackson did not, ultimately, bring any case to court.

== See also ==
- Media in Manchester
- ITV Studios – Granada Television's production arm
- Granada plc – Granada Television's parent company

ITV regional service
New service as Granada Television (North of England service)	Yorkshire (weekdays); 5 November 1956 – 26 July 1968	Succeeded by Yorkshire Television
New service as Granada Television (North of England service)	North West England (weekdays); 3 May 1956 – present	Current provider as ITV Granada
Preceded by ABC Weekend TV	North West England (weekends); 29 July 1968 – present	Current provider as ITV Granada
Preceded by ITV Tyne Tees & Border	Isle of Man; 16 July 2009 – present	Current provider as ITV Granada
