= 3 Generations (company) =

American film production company

3 Generations is a non-profit documentary film production company based in New York City, United States. It aims to highlight human rights abuses through film. The company's films include The Devil Came on Horseback, Tricked, and A Different American Dream.

== Background ==
3 Generations was founded by director Jane Wells in 2007 after a visit to Western Sudan, where she witnessed the impact of the Darfur genocide on survivors.

Whilst in Darfur, Wells encountered photojournalist Brian Steidle, with whom she agreed to produce The Devil Came on Horseback, a film about his experiences documenting the genocide.

Wells' father, Sidney Bernstein, was a filmmaker and producer, who accompanied the Allied Forces during the liberation of Bergen-Belsen, documenting the conditions inside the concentration camp. Suppressed at the time by Britain's post-war government due to foreign policy concerns, Bernstein's film was restored in 2008 by the Imperial War Museum, with production from 3 Generations, and released in 2017 under the title German Concentration Camps Factual Survey.

Wells stated in 2007 that the impetus for using the medium of documentary film to highlight human rights injustices is to "foster the healing process and illuminate our common humanity."

== Aims ==
The company's stated aim is to "document stories of human rights abuses through film. We enable survivors of crimes against humanity to record their experiences as an act of healing, a call to action, and to create historical evidence."

== Filmography ==
3 Generations has produced documentary films including The Devil Came on Horseback, Tricked, A Different American Dream, Lost in Lebanon, Pot Luck,Preserving the Holocaust and Here lived.

Films
Year	Film title	Director	Produced/Distributed by
2024	Here Lived	Jane Wells	Produced by 3 Generations
2022	A Kaddish for Selim	Jane Wells	Produced by 3 Generations Associate Producer Paloma Perez
2021	Any Given Day	Margaret Byrne	Produced by Beti Films in Association with 3 Generations
2021	Preserving the Holocaust	Jane Wells	Produced by 3 Generations
2020	Pot Luck	Jane Wells	Produced by Jane Wells, Simon Brook
2020	They Ain't Ready for Me	Brad Rothschild	Produced by Red Shield Pictures in partnership with 3 Generations
2018	Go Debbie	Jane Wells	Produced by 3 Generations
2016	A Different American Dream	Simon Brook	Produced by Jane Wells Distributed by 3 Generations
2016	Lost in Lebanon	Georgia and Sophia Scott	Produced by Georgia Scott, Sophia Scott, & Jane Wells Distributed by 3 Generations
2016	A System of Justice	Jane Wells & Brad Rothschild	Produced by 3 Generations
2016	Three	Jane Wells	Produced by Elizabeth Woller and Jane Wells
2014	German Concentration Camps Factual Survey	Sidney Bernstein	Distributed by 3 Generations & Menemsha Films
2014	In the Shadow of War	Georgia Scott and Sophia Scott	Distributed by 3 Generations
2013	Tricked	John-Keith Wasson and Jane Wells	Produced by Jane Wells and John-Keith Wasson
2013	Native Silence	Jane Wells	Produced by 3 Generations
2012	Lost Hope	Jane Wells	Produced by 3 Generations
2007	The Devil Came on Horseback	Annie Sundberg, Ricki Stern	Produced by Annie Sundberg, Ricki Stern, Gretchen Wallace, Jane Wells
