= Craig McKay (film editor) =

American feature film editor, story consultant, director, and executive producer

- Occupation: Film editor

Craig McKay (born in New York's Hudson Valley) is an American feature film editor, story consultant, director, and executive producer. Recognized with two Academy Award nominations for editing Reds and The Silence of the Lambs, and an Emmy Award for editing the NBC miniseries Holocaust, he has edited more than forty films including Philadelphia, The Manchurian Candidate, Cop Land and Maid in Manhattan.

His directing credits include Bubbe Meises, Bubbe Stories for PBS and HBO's The Red Shoes, written by John Guare. Story consultant credits include Bravo's Haiti: Dreams of Democracy, Academy Award-nominated Mandela, and PBS's award-winning Witness: Voices from the Holocaust.

McKay has served as a creative advisor at the Sundance Institute Filmmaker's Lab and is also an executive producer on the award-winning feature-length documentary A Normal Life.

He is a member of the DGA, AMPAS, WGAE and Local 700. McKay has been elected to membership in the American Cinema Editors.

== Selected filmography ==
Editor
Year	Film	Director	Notes
1977	Thieves	John Berry	
1980	Melvin and Howard	Jonathan Demme	First collaboration with Jonathan Demme
1981	Reds	Warren Beatty	
1984	Swing Shift	Jonathan Demme	Second collaboration with Jonathan Demme
1986	Something Wild	Jonathan Demme	Third collaboration with Jonathan Demme
1988	White Hot	Robby Benson	
1988	Married to the Mob	Jonathan Demme	Fourth collaboration with Jonathan Demme
1989	She-Devil	Susan Seidelman	First collaboration with Susan Seidelman
1990	Miami Blues	George Armitage	
1991	The Silence of the Lambs	Jonathan Demme	Fifth collaboration with Jonathan Demme
1992	Shining Through	David Seltzer	
1993	Mad Dog and Glory	John McNaughton	
1993	Philadelphia	Jonathan Demme	Sixth collaboration with Jonathan Demme
1996	Some Mother's Son	Terry George	
1997	Cop Land	James Mangold	Second collaboration with James Mangold
1998	Return to Paradise	Joseph Ruben	
1999	A Map of the World	Scott Elliott	
2000	Blue Moon	John A. Gallagher	First collaboration with John A. Gallagher
2001	K-PAX	Iain Softley	
2002	Maid in Manhattan	Wayne Wang	
2004	The Manchurian Candidate	Jonathan Demme	Seventh collaboration with Jonathan Demme
2004	Surviving Christmas	Mike Mitchell	
2005	Everything Is Illuminated	Liev Schreiber	
2007	Awake	Joby Harold	
2008	Life in Flight	Tracey Hecht	
2008	New York, I Love You	Fatih Akin; Yvan Attal; Randall Balsmeyer; Allen Hughes; Shunji Iwai; Jiang Wen; Shekhar Kapur; Joshua Marston; Mira Nair; Natalie Portman; Brett Ratner	Uncredited
2009	Sin Nombre	Cary Joji Fukunaga	
2009	Carriers	Àlex Pastor; David Pastor	
2010	The Conspirator	Robert Redford	
2013	Ain't Them Bodies Saints	David Lowery	
2013	Europa Report	Sebastián Cordero	
2015	The Curse of Downers Grove	Derick Martini	

Editorial department
Year	Film	Director	Role	Notes
1967	Mission Mars	Nicholas Webster	Assistant editor	
1970	Last of the Mobile Hot Shots	Sidney Lumet	Assistant editor	
1970	The Way We Live Now	Barry Brown	Assistant editor	
1970	Puzzle of a Downfall Child	Jerry Schatzberg	Assistant editor	First collaboration with Jerry Schatzberg
1971	Who Is Harry Kellerman and Why Is He Saying Those Terrible Things About Me?	Ulu Grosbard	Associate film editor	
1972	The Effect of Gamma Rays on Man-in-the-Moon Marigolds	Paul Newman	Assistant editor	
1973	Scarecrow	Jerry Schatzberg	Associate editor	Second collaboration with Jerry Schatzberg
1973	The Exorcist	William Friedkin	Assistant film editor	
1979	The Wanderers	Philip Kaufman	Additional editor	
1998	Practical Magic	Griffin Dunne	Additional editor	
2001	Gaudi Afternoon	Susan Seidelman	Editorial consultant	Second collaboration with Susan Seidelman
2009	Sin Nombre	Cary Joji Fukunaga	Editorial consultant	
2009	Road, Movie	Dev Benegal	Consulting editor	
2010	The Whistleblower	Larysa Kondracki	Consulting editor	
2011	On the Ice	Andrew Okpeaha MacLean	Consulting editor	
2011	Dream House	Jim Sheridan	Additional editor	
2012	Goats	Christopher Neil	Additional editor	
2015	Solace	Afonso Poyart	Additional editor	

Sound department
Year	Film	Director	Role	Notes
1972	Slaughterhouse-Five	George Roy Hill	Sound	Uncredited
1975	Night Moves	Arthur Penn	Sound editor	

Thanks
Year	Film	Director	Role	Notes
1995	Heavy	James Mangold	Very special thanks	First collaboration with James Mangold
1996	Manny & Lo	Lisa Krueger	Special thanks	
1996	Domain of the Sense	Judith Colell; Isabel Gardela; Nuria Olivé-Bellés; Teresa Pelegri; María Ripoll	Thanks	
1997	A Brother's Kiss	Seth Zvi Rosenfeld	Thanks	
1998	Smoke Signals	Chris Eyre	Thanks	
1999	The Opportunists	Myles Connell	Thanks	
2015	The Networker	John A. Gallagher	Special thanks	Second collaboration with John A. Gallagher

Documentaries

Editor
Year	Film	Director
2010	Babies	Thomas Balmès
2013	Tricked	John-Keith Wasson; Jane Wells

TV documentaries

Producer
Year	Film	Director	Credit
1988	Haiti Dreams of Democracy	Jonathan Demme; Jo Menell	Co-producer
2011	A Game of Honor	Peter Radovich	Associate producer

TV movies

Editor
Year	Film	Director
1978	Holocaust	Marvin J. Chomsky
1978	How to Pick Up Girls!	Mick Jackson; Bill Persky
1980	Death Penalty	Waris Hussein
1982	Born Beautiful	Harvey Hart
1983	Living Proof: The Hank Williams Jr. Story	Dick Lowry
1985	Private Sessions	Michael Pressman
1985	Doubletake	Jud Taylor
1987	A Gathering of Old Men	Volker Schlöndorff

Director
Year	Film	Notes
1994	Bubbe Meises: Bubbe Stories	Television special
1997	Subway Stories	"The Red Shoes" segment

TV series

Editor
Year	Title	Notes
1978	Holocaust	2 episodes
1985	Doubletake	2 episodes
1987	Trying Times	

Editorial department
Year	Title	Role	Notes
1987	Trying Times	Post-production consultant	2 episodes

Director
Year	Title	Notes
1984	Saturday Night Live	1 episode

TV specials

Editor
Year	Film	Director
1974	Free to Be... You and Me	Bill Davis; Len Steckler; Fred Wolf
1994	Bubbe Meises: Bubbe Stories	Himself

== Academy Award Nominations ==
- 1982 – Reds (nominated) Academy Award Best Editing (with co-editor Dede Allen)
- 1992 – The Silence of the Lambs (nominated) Academy Award Best Editing

== Other Awards and Nominations ==
- 1978 – Holocaust (miniseries) (won) Emmy Awards Emmy Outstanding Film Editing in a Drama Series (with co-editors Stephen A. Rotter, Robert M. Reitano, Alan Heim and Brian Smedley-Aston)
- 1979 – Holocaust (miniseries) (won) American Cinema Editors (ACE) Eddie Best Edited Episode from a Television Mini-Series
- 1982 – Reds (nominated) American Cinema Editors (ACE) Eddie Best Edited Feature Film (with co-editor Dede Allen)
- 1992 – The Silence of the Lambs (nominated) BAFTA Film Award - Best Editing
- 1992 – The Silence of the Lambs (nominated) American Cinema Editors (ACE) Eddie Best Edited Feature Film
- 2012 – The Silence of the Lambs was listed as the 26th best-edited film of all time in a survey of members of the Motion Picture Editors Guild.
