= Night Will Fall =

- Directed by: Andre Singer
- Written by: Lynette Singer
- Produced by: Sally Angel; Brett Ratner
- Narrated by: Helena Bonham Carter
- Cinematography: Richard Blanshard
- Edited by: Arik Lahav-Leibovich; Steve Miller
- Music by: Nicholas Singer
- Distributed by: BFI
- Release date: 7 June 2014 (Sheffield DocFest)
- Running time: 75 minutes
- Country: United Kingdom

Night Will Fall is a 2014 documentary film directed by Andre Singer that chronicles the production of the 1945 British government documentary German Concentration Camps Factual Survey, which showed gruesome scenes from newly liberated Nazi concentration camps. The 1945 documentary, which was based on the work of combat cameramen serving with the armed forces and newsreel footage, was produced by Sidney Bernstein, then a British government official, with participation by Alfred Hitchcock. It languished in British archives for nearly seven decades before being completed in 2014. About 12 minutes of footage in the 75-minute Night Will Fall is from the earlier documentary.

The title of the film was derived from a line of narration written for 1945 documentary: "Unless the world learns the lesson these pictures teach, night will fall."

== Synopsis ==
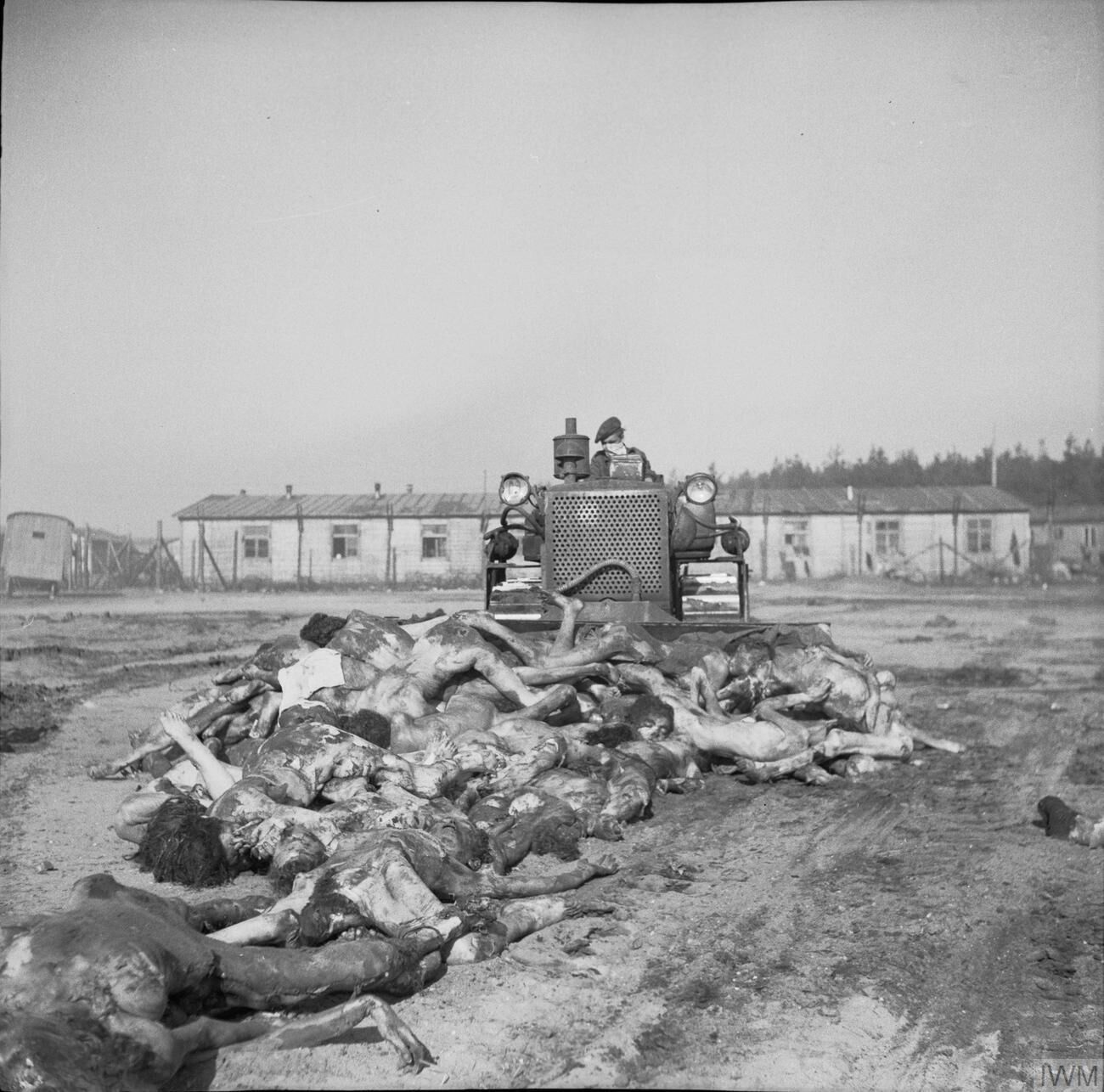
A British Army bulldozer pushes bodies into a mass grave at Belsen, 19 April 1945

The film explores the importance of film as a medium for documenting warfare, focusing on the work of the Allied cameramen who, in 1944 and 1945, filmed the liberation of the prison, labor, and extermination camps run by the Nazis and their allies in Germany and eastern Europe. It includes archival footage gathered for German Concentration Camps Factual Survey, a 1945 British documentary, as well as recent interviews with survivors and liberators. Producers, editors, and cameramen who worked on the 1945 documentary are also featured, and the reasons behind its long-delayed release are explored.

Sidney Bernstein was inspired to make the 1945 documentary after seeing footage of the liberation of the Bergen-Belsen concentration camp by British forces; this footage was later used as evidence in the Nuremberg trials. The camp commander, Josef Kramer, and the camp guards were taken as POWs and forced to aid in burial of the masses of dead prisoners, whose bodies had been left on the ground all around the camp. Soviet cameramen had previously filmed the liberation of other camps, including Auschwitz and Majdanek in Poland, but, when Westerners first saw the footage and heard the reports, they suspected the Soviets of producing atrocity propaganda, as had been the case in some instances. After the war, the Allies forced German officials and servicemen and civilians from the towns surrounding concentration camps to tour the camps, both to confront them with the deeds perpetrated by their government and in their neighborhood, and so they could not later deny what had happened. They were forced to see the piles of people who had died of starvation, torture, and disease; partially-burned remains in the crematoria; and gruesome displays, such as warehouses full of things such bales of hair, piles of clothing, children's toys, eyeglasses, and other valuables stripped from the huge numbers of dead.

Director Alfred Hitchcock was recruited to work on the 1945 documentary, and Night Will Fall includes a recording of an interview with him about the project. Although he only worked on it for a short time, commentators believe he strongly influenced its shape and expression. In addition to Hitchcock, Bernstein assembled a team to work on the 1945 documentary that included members such as Stewart McAllister (referred to in the film as "perhaps the best-known film editor in London") and Richard Crossman.

Editing was nearly complete on the 1945 documentary when the British government decided to shelve it. In his interview in Night Will Fall, Branko Lustig, producer of Schindler's List and an internee at Auschwitz and Bergen-Belsen, theorizes that the 1945 work was shelved for political reasons, such as shifting relationships between the Allies and the imminence of the Cold War. He also comments that, "At this time, the Brits had enough problems with the Jews", referring to the growing pressure to make Palestine, then a League of Nations mandate under British control, a Jewish state, and the influx of Jewish migrants from Europe to the region after WWII.

Lustig relates hearing the unearthly music of bagpipes when Bergen-Belsen was liberated, as, apparently, British forces were led by Scots playing the pipes. At the time, the 12-year-old Lustig was so weak he could not raise his body to look out the window, and he thought he was about to die or was already dead, and this was the music of angels about which he had heard. Among the other survivors of the Nazi concentration camps who are interviewed in Night Will Fall are Anita Lasker-Wallfisch. Eva Mozes Kor tells of seeing Soviet soldiers in white camouflage uniforms liberate Auschwitz in the snow, and of the soldiers giving prisoners chocolate, cookies, and hugs. The film also includes clips of interviews with cameramen who had filmed at the concentration camps during and after their liberation.

== Background and production ==
In 1945, Bernstein, who was with the British Ministry of Information at the time, initiated German Concentration Camps Factual Survey, a joint British and American project, to document for the German public the crimes perpetrated by the Nazis in their concentration camps. He brought in Richard Crossman to write the narration, and had Alfred Hitchcock flown over from Hollywood to advise on the structure. When editing was nearly completed, the British government shelved the project without showing it to the public. Questions remain about their reasons for refusing to release it at the time, such as whether they suppressed it for political reasons, or determined that other projects would be more effective in the de-Nazification process.

Andre Singer, director of Night Will Fall, said in an interview that, after the war ended in Europe in May 1945, "government priorities shifted [in Britain]. What seemed like a good idea in 1945 became a problem by June and July." The British needed the German people to rebuild their country, and the 1945 documentary would not have contributed to that. There was also a concern that "it would provoke most sympathy for the Jewish refugees still in the camps after the war [who] wanted to go to Palestine. The British were having problems with nascent Zionism and felt the film would be unhelpful."

=== Adaptations of German Concentration Camps Factual Survey ===
Later in 1945, the 22-minute short film Death Mills was produced by Billy Wilder for United States government authorities from some of the footage assembled for the 1945 documentary. A German-language version of Death Mills, directed by Hanus Burger, was shown to German audiences in the United States occupation zone in January 1946.

The five completed reels of German Concentration Camps Factual Survey (out of a planned six) were released in 1984 as Memory of the Camps, which was televised in the United States the following year.

=== Restoration and Night Will Fall ===
The Imperial War Museum received the footage and script for Bernstein's project in 1952. It started restoration work on the 1945 documentary in 2008, work which included completing the unfinished sixth reel. The completed film had its world premiere at the Berlin International Film Festival in early 2014.

Andre Singer heard about the 1945 documentary and its restoration from Sally Angel, who worked at the Imperial War Museum. His interest in telling the story behind it, as well as following up with survivors and other participants of the documented events, led him to make Night Will Fall, which was produced by Angel and Brett Ratner, with funding coming from production companies in Great Britain, Israel, Germany, the United States, and Denmark. The film includes some color 16 mm footage of the concentration camps shot by American cameramen in 1945.

== Screenings ==
On 24 January 2015, Night Will Fall was broadcast in the UK on Channel 4 as a single continuous programme, without any commercial breaks. It aired on major networks around the world during the week of 27 January, Holocaust Remembrance Day and the 70th anniversary of the liberation of Auschwitz. SVT broadcast it in Sweden on 26 January, NRK broadcast it in Norway three times the same month, and HBO broadcast it in the United States.

== Reception ==
=== Critical reaction ===
The film received critical acclaim. On the review aggregator website Rotten Tomatoes, 100% of 25 critics' reviews of Night Will Fall are positive, with an average rating of 8.3/10. Variety called it a "powerful, must-see documentary." Peter Bradshaw of The Guardian said the film shows "images which I have certainly never seen before. It exposes once again the obscenity of Holocaust denial. This is an extraordinary record. But be warned. Once seen, these images cannot be unseen." The New York Times called it "not a film you're likely to forget," while also commenting that "what the new film accomplishes, more than anything else, is to make you wish you could see the original."

=== Accolades ===
Nicholas Singer's score for the film was nominated for Best Original Composition – Feature Film Score at the 2015 Music+Sound Awards, UK. When the film won the Royal Television Society Programme Award in the History category, the organisation called it: "A landmark film, an affirmation of the importance of television as a medium of truth and a document of record in itself." Some of the other awards won by the film include:

- 2016 Peabody Awards: Documentary and Educational
- News and Documentary Emmy Awards: Outstanding Historical Programming – Long Form
- FOCAL International Awards: Best Use of [Archive] Footage in a Cinema Release
- FOCAL International Awards: Best Use of [Archive] Footage in a History Production
- Moscow Jewish Film Festival: Best Documentary Feature Film
