= 3 Generations =

3 Generations may refer to:

- 3 Generations (film), a 2015 American film
- 3 Generations (company), a non-profit film production company
