= Jasper Britton =

British actor (born 1962)

- Britton as Petruchio
- Born: 11 December 1962 (age 63); Chelsea, London, England
- Occupation: Actor
- Years active: 1989–present
- Parent(s): Tony Britton; Eva Skytte Birkefeldt
- Relatives: Fern Britton (half-sister)

Jasper Britton (born 11 December 1962) is an English actor.

== Early life and education ==
Britton was born in Chelsea in London, and educated at Belmont Preparatory School, Sussex House School and Mill Hill School, north London. Britton is the only son of the actor Tony Britton and his second wife, the Danish sculptor Eva Castle Britton (née Skytte Birkefeldt). His half-sisters are the television presenter Fern Britton and scriptwriter Cherry Britton.

== Career ==
=== Stage ===
Britton worked for six years as an assistant stage manager and sound operator until 1989 when, while working for Jonathan Miller at the Old Vic, he forced his way into Miller's office and refused to leave until Miller agreed to let him audition for King Lear. His King of France to Eric Porter's Lear was the beginning of a prolific stage career. Early plays included The Visit with Théâtre de Complicité at the Royal National Theatre, The Cherry Orchard, Macbeth and A Flea in her Ear at Nottingham Playhouse. A season at the Royal Shakespeare Company included A Jovial Crew for Max Stafford-Clark, Tamburlaine for Terry Hands and The Beggar's Opera and Antony and Cleopatra for John Caird. There followed the Dauphin in St Joan at the Strand Theatre and an award-winning performance as Rupert in Rope at Salisbury Playhouse.

Upon replacing Eddie Izzard in the title role in Brian Cox's 1995 Richard III, he garnered excellent reviews. He next played the groom role in Blood Wedding at the Young Vic, the first in a series of romantic leads, followed by Rupert Goold's adaptation of End of the Affair, Jonathan Church's Romeo and Juliet and Bill Bryden's Three Sisters.

Britton was part of Trevor Nunn's ensemble company at the National Theatre in 1999, playing Thersites in Troilus and Cressida, Ryumin in Maxim Gorky's Summerfolk, and Smooth in Money. Two seasons at the Shakespeare's Globe for Mark Rylance followed, first playing Palamon in The Two Noble Kinsmen, and Caliban in The Tempest. A year later he returned as Macbeth. After Simon Gray's Japes for Peter Hall at the Haymarket Theatre and Alan Ayckbourn's Bedroom Farce at the Aldwych Theatre came Britton's performance as Petruchio in The Taming of the Shrew and The Tamer Tamed for Gregory Doran at the Royal Shakespeare Company and the Kennedy Centre in Washington, D.C. respectively, which transferred to the Queen's Theatre in London.

In 2008, he played John Gielgud in Nicholas de Jongh's first play Plague Over England, Nansen in Tony Harrison's Fram and Creon opposite Ralph Fiennes in Oedipus the King, the latter both at the National Theatre. In 2009, he played Elyot in Private Lives opposite Claire Price at Hampstead Theatre, directed by Lucy Bailey. Most recently he played one third of Simon Gray's persona in The Last Cigarette at Chichester Festival Theatre and the Trafalgar Studios, with Felicity Kendal and Nicholas Le Prevost; and Jack Lawson in Mamet's Race at the Hampstead Theatre.

He played the title role Barabas in The Jew of Malta production at the Royal Shakespeare Company in Stratford-upon-Avon in 2015. He replaced Nigel Lindsay as Henry Bolingbroke when the RSC's 2013 production of Richard II was shown at the Barbican Centre as part of the King and Country Cycle, as well as reprising his role as the title character in Henry IV Parts I and II.

In 2017, he played Dr Rance in the Leicester Curve production of What the Butler Saw. In 2018, he played Johnny 'Rooster' Byron in the first revival of Jez Butterworth's Jerusalem at the Watermill Theatre, Newbury.

=== Film ===
Britton played the Court Laureate in Terrence Malick's The New World alongside Colin Farrell, Jonathan Pryce and Christian Bale. He donned bells and hankies to play Will Frosser, the foreman of the Millsham Morris Side in the film Morris: A Life with Bells On.

=== Television ===
Britton's television credits include two series of My Dad's the Prime Minister, and Brief Encounters: Semi-Detached for the BBC, as well as Highlander: The Series. In 2006, he appeared in two TV films: as pirate William Howard in Blackbeard with Mark Umbers and Stacy Keach, and alongside Oliver Dimsdale and Heathcote Williams as Henry II in Nostradamus.

== Filmography ==
=== Film ===
Year	Title	Role	Notes
2005	The New World	Laureate	
2009	Morris: A Life with Bells On	Will Frosser	
2011	Anonymous	Pope	
2012	Blood	Daniel Heston	
2014	Royal Shakespeare Company: Henry IV Part I	Henry IV	
2014	Royal Shakespeare Company: Henry IV Part II	Henry IV	
2014	Night Will Fall	Narrator	Documentary
2014	German Concentration Camps Factual Survey	Narrator	Documentary
2015	Rise of the Footsoldier Part II	Norton	
2017	What the Butler Saw.	Dr. Rance	Direct-to-video
2019	Here Comes Hell	The Host	
2023	The Critic	Gideon Lambert	
2023	Hijack	Terry Reid/Marcus Sutton	

=== Television ===
Year	Title	Role	Notes
1987	Ever Decreasing Circles	Football Supporter	Episode: "Relaxation"
1995	The Bill	Vernon	Episode: "Bad Pictures"
1995	Casualty	Graham Webster	Episode: "Castles in the Air"
1996	Mike and Angelo	William Shakespeare	Episode: "My Pal Puck"
1997	Breakout	Lenny Johnson	Television film
1997	Highlander: The Series	Willie Kingsley	Episode: "Diplomatic Immunity"
2000	Big Kids	Ming	3 episodes
2002	The Cry	Mark Billington	4 episodes
2002	Heartbeat	Stanley Hodges	Episode: "A Many Splendoured Thing"
2003	Murder in Mind	George Blakeney	Episode: "Echoes"
2003–2004	My Dad's the Prime Minister	Duncan Packer	13 episodes
2005	Midsomer Murders	Anselm Plummer	Episode: "Sauce for the Goose"
2005	Carrie & Barry	Policeman	Episode: "Banned Barry"
2006	The Royal	Paul Guthrie	Episode: "Thinking Too Hard"
2006	Brief Encounters	Richard	Episode: "Semi-Detached"
2006	Nostradamus	Henry II of France	Television film
2006	Blackbeard	William Howard	3 episodes
2010	Garrow's Law	Captain Colingwood	Episode #2.1
2023	Hijack	Terry	7 episodes

=== Other ===
Year	Title	Role	Notes
2014	Henry IV: Part I	King Henry IV	Royal Shakespeare Company
2014	Henry IV: Part II	King Henry IV	Royal Shakespeare Company
2023	Hamlette	Gus	Podcast
