= Richard Crossman =

British Labour Party politician (1907–1974)

The Right Honourable Richard Crossman OBE
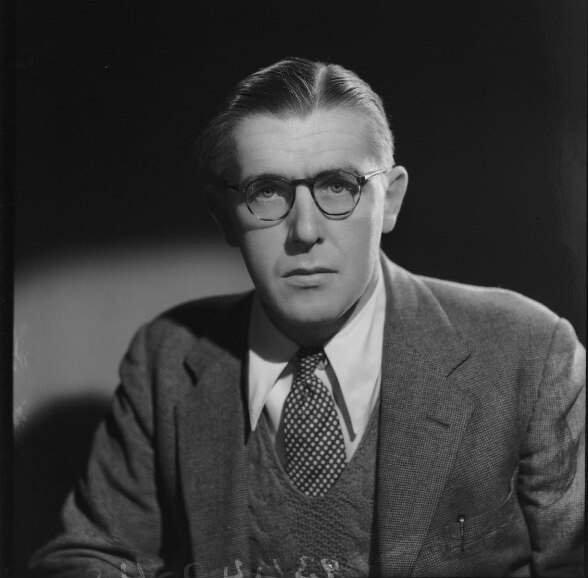
- Crossman in 1947

Secretary of State for Social Services
- In office 1 November 1968 – 19 June 1970
- Prime Minister: Harold Wilson
- Preceded by: Position established
- Succeeded by: Keith Joseph

Lord President of the Council Leader of the House of Commons
- In office 11 August 1966 – 18 October 1968
- Prime Minister: Harold Wilson
- Preceded by: Herbert Bowden
- Succeeded by: Fred Peart

Minister of Housing and Local Government
- In office 16 October 1964 – 11 August 1966
- Prime Minister: Harold Wilson
- Preceded by: Keith Joseph
- Succeeded by: Tony Greenwood

Shadow Secretary of State for Education
- In office 14 February 1963 – 16 October 1964
- Leader: Harold Wilson
- Succeeded by: Quintin Hogg

Chair of the National Executive Committee of the Labour Party
- In office 7 October 1960 – 6 October 1961
- Leader: Hugh Gaitskell
- Preceded by: George Brinham
- Succeeded by: Harold Wilson

Member of Parliament for Coventry East
- In office 5 July 1945 – 8 February 1974
- Preceded by: Constituency created
- Succeeded by: Constituency abolished

Personal details
- Born: Richard Howard Stafford Crossman; 15 December 1907 Buckhurst Hill, Essex, England
- Died: 5 April 1974 (aged 66) Banbury, England
- Party: Labour
- Spouses: Erika Glück; Zita Baker; Anne McDougall
- Education: New College, Oxford

Richard Howard Stafford Crossman OBE (15 December 1907 – 5 April 1974) was a British Labour Party politician. A university classics lecturer by profession, he was elected a Member of Parliament in 1945 and became a significant figure among the party's advocates of Zionism. He was a Bevanite on the left of the party, and a long-serving member of Labour's National Executive Committee (NEC) from 1952.

Crossman was a Cabinet minister in Harold Wilson's governments of 1964–1970, first for Housing, then as Leader of the House of Commons, and then for Social Services. In the early 1970s, Crossman was editor of the New Statesman. He is remembered for his highly revealing three-volume Diaries of a Cabinet Minister, published posthumously.

== Early life ==
Crossman was born on 15 December 1907 at Buckhurst Hill House, Essex, the son of Charles Stafford Crossman, a barrister and later a High Court judge, and Helen Elizabeth (née Howard). Helen was of the Howard family of Ilford descended from Luke Howard, a Quaker chemist and meteorologist who founded the pharmaceutical company Howards and Sons.

Crossman grew up in Buckhurst Hill, Essex, and was educated at Twyford School, and at Winchester College (although founders' kin privileges at Winchester were abolished in 1857, Crossman was "founder's kin", being descended from William of Wykeham through John Danvers, one of his father's ancestors), where he became head boy. He excelled academically and on the football field. He studied Classics at New College, Oxford, where he was friendly with W.H. Auden. He received a double first and became a fellow in 1931. He taught philosophy at the university before becoming a Workers' Educational Association lecturer. He was a councillor on Oxford City Council, and became head of its Labour group in 1935.

== Personal life ==
Crossman, who had been noted for his good looks as a youth, had predominantly same-sex affairs at Oxford. In an early diary, he describes an Easter holiday with an unnamed young poet: "He kept me in a little white-washed room for a fortnight because his mouth was against mine and we were completely together."

After being married to Erika Glück, a divorcée, whom he met while travelling in Germany after graduation, he married Zita Baker (ex-wife of John Baker) in 1937.

== Service in World War II and afterwards ==
At the outbreak of the Second World War, Crossman joined the Political Warfare Executive under Robert Bruce Lockhart, where he headed the German Section. He produced anti-Nazi propaganda broadcasts for the BBC German Service and the Radio of the European Revolution, set up by the Special Operations Executive (SOE). He eventually became Assistant Chief of the Psychological Warfare Division of SHAEF and was awarded an OBE for his wartime service.

In April 1945, Crossman was one of the first British officers to enter the former Dachau concentration camp. With war correspondent Colin Wills, Crossman co-wrote the script for German Concentration Camps Factual Survey, a British government documentary, produced by Sidney Bernstein with treatment advice by Alfred Hitchcock, that showed gruelling scenes from Nazi concentration camps. The uncompleted film was shelved for decades before being assembled by scholars at the Imperial War Museum and released in 2014. That same year, German Concentration Camps Factual Survey was itself the subject of a documentary, Night Will Fall.

Crossman became a key participant in the annual Königswinter Conference, organised by Lilo Milchsack to bring together British and German legislators, academics and opinion-formers from 1950 onwards. The conferences were credited with helping to heal bad memories created by the war. At them, Crossman met the German politician Hans von Herwarth, the ex-soldier Fridolin von Senger und Etterlin, future German President Richard von Weizsäcker and other leading German decision makers. Other attendees at the conferences included Denis Healey, soon to become a Labour Party politician, and Robin Day, later a political broadcaster.

== Political career: 1945–51 ==
Crossman entered the House of Commons at the 1945 general election as the Member of Parliament (MP) for Coventry East, a seat he held until shortly before he died in 1974. During his time as an MP, he faced and defeated three Conservative challengers who would all later become prominent MPs and serve in the Thatcher governments of the 1980s. John Biffen (the 1959 election) and John Wakeham (1966) would serve in Thatcher's cabinet, while Ian Gow (1964) would become her Private Parliamentary Secretary.

During 1945–46 he served, on the nomination of the Foreign Secretary Ernest Bevin, as a member of the Anglo-American Committee of Inquiry into the Problems of European Jewry and Palestine. The committee's report, submitted in April 1946, included a recommendation for 100,000 Jewish displaced persons to be permitted to enter Mandatory Palestine. Short of American financial and military assistance, the British government refused to implement the report's recommendations. Thereafter Crossman led the socialist opposition to the official British policy for Palestine. That incurred Bevin's enmity, and may have been the primary factor which prevented Crossman from achieving ministerial rank during the 1945–51 government. Crossman initially supported the Arab cause, but became a lifelong Zionist after meeting Chaim Weizmann. In his diary, he described Weizmann as "one of the very few great men I have ever met." Crossman remained a supporter of Israel during his political career from the late-1940s until his death in 1974. At a 1959 lecture in Israel, Crossman attacked what he perceived as hypocrisy over Israel regarding anti-indigenous racism.

"For generations it had been assumed that civilisation would be spread by the white man settling overseas... No one, until the 20th century, seriously challenged their right, or indeed their duty, to civilise these continents by physically occupying them, even at the cost of wiping out the aboriginal population."

During the Palestine Emergency, Crossman's support for Zionism went as far as collaborating against the British Mandate government. One such attack in which he was implicated was the Night of the Bridges. Although no British soldiers were killed in the initial attacks, 20-year-old Royal Engineer Roy Charles Allen was killed while trying to defuse a bomb. Christopher Mayhew later recounted the collaboration in his book Publish It Not: The Middle East Cover-up,

"One day, Crossman, now in the House of Commons, came to see Strachey… [Crossman] had heard from his friends in the Jewish Agency that they were contemplating an act of sabotage … Should this be done, or should it not? Few would be killed … Crossman asked Strachey for his advice … The next day in the smoking room at the House of Commons, Strachey gave his approval to Crossman. The Haganah went ahead and blew up all the bridges over the [River] Jordan."

Crossman later claimed that Bevin and Clement Attlee had acted on "prejudice in favour of the native and against the white settler." He never forgave either of them for anti-Zionist policies, later telling Frank Soskice,

"You seem to have forgotten that Clement Attlee and Ernest Bevin plotted to destroy the Jews in Palestine and then encouraged the Arabs to murder the lot. I fought them at the time as murderers. I can never trust them again and you can't expect me to forgive them for genocide."

Crossman cemented his role as a leader of the left wing of the Parliamentary Labour Party in 1947 by co-authoring the Keep Left pamphlet, and later became one of the more prominent Bevanites.

== Anti-communist propaganda ==
Crossman is considered by historians to be a central figure to British Cold War propaganda due to his collaboration with the Information Research Department (IRD), a secret branch of the UK Foreign Office dedicated to disinformation, anti-communist, and pro-colonial propaganda during the Cold War. The IRD secretly funded, published and distributed many of Crossman's articles and books, including The God that Failed. His anti-communist works were not only of special interest to British propagandists but were also secretly sponsored by the US government, which translated his works into Malay and Chinese. Crossman was also a regular contributor to Encounter, an "anti-Stalinist" publication which received funding from MI6 and the CIA.

Crossman's intense relationship with disinformation for propaganda purposes led to many people nicknaming him "Dick Double-Crossman". His name was also included within one of George Orwell's notebooks following the discovery of Orwell's list, being noted by Orwell as being "Too dishonest to be outright F. T" (fellow-traveller).

== Political career: 1951–70 ==
Crossman was a member of the National Executive Committee of the Labour Party from 1952 to 1967 and served as its chair from 1960 to 1961.

In 1957, Crossman was one of the plaintiffs, along with Aneurin Bevan and Morgan Phillips, in a claim for libel made against The Spectator, which had described the three men as drinking heavily during a socialist conference in Italy. Having sworn that the charges were untrue, the three collected damages from the magazine. Many years later, Crossman's posthumously published diaries confirmed that The Spectator's charges had been true and that all three of them had perjured themselves.

Crossman was Labour's spokesman on education before the 1964 general election, but upon forming the new Government Harold Wilson appointed him to the Cabinet as Minister of Housing and Local Government. In 1966, Crossman became Lord President of the Council and Leader of the House of Commons.

Between 1968 and 1970, he was the first Secretary of State for Social Services, in which position he worked on an ambitious proposal to supplement Britain's flat-rate state pension with an earnings-related element. The proposal had not, however, been passed into law at the time the Labour Party lost the 1970 general election. During the months of political turmoil that led up to the election loss, Crossman had been considered, however briefly, as a last-minute option to replace Wilson as Prime Minister.

== Books and journalism ==
After Labour's general election defeat in 1970, Crossman resigned from the Labour front bench to become editor of the New Statesman, where he had been a frequent contributor and assistant editor from 1938 until 1955. He left the New Statesman in 1972.

In the 1950s and 1960s, Crossman also had a regular column titled "Crossman Says..." in the Daily Mirror, the Labour-supporting tabloid newspaper. Along with the column of "Cassandra", Crossman's reporting provided the bulk of political and international commentary in the newspaper.

Crossman was a prolific writer and editor. In Plato To-Day (1937) he imagines Plato visiting Nazi Germany and Stalinist Russia. Plato criticises Nazi and Communist politicians for misusing the ideas he had set forth in the Republic. After the war, Crossman edited The God That Failed (1949), a collection of anti-Communist essays by former Communists.

Crossman is best remembered for his colourful and highly subjective three-volume Diaries of a Cabinet Minister, written while he was living in Vincent Square, published posthumously from 1975 to 1977 and covering his time in government from 1964 to 1970. The diaries appeared after his death, following a legal battle by the government to block publication. One of Crossman's legal executors was Michael Foot, then a cabinet minister, who opposed his own government's attempts to suppress the diaries. Among other things, the diaries describe Crossman's battles with "the Dame", his Permanent Secretary Evelyn Sharp, GBE (1903–1985), the first woman in Britain to hold the position. Crossman's backbench diaries were published in 1981. Crossman's diaries were an acknowledged source for the television comedy series Yes Minister.

== Death ==
Richard Crossman died of liver cancer at 3.30pm on 5 April 1974 at his home in Banbury Oxfordshire. He had known since September 1973 that he was terminally ill. He was cremated five days later and was survived by his third wife, Anne Patricia (15 April 1920 – 3 October 2008; née McDougall, daughter of Patrick McDougall, of Prescote Manor, Cropredy, founder of the Banbury cattle market), with whom he shared common descent from the Danvers family of Cropredy. Anne Crossman worked at Bletchley Park during the Second World War, and served as secretary to Maurice Edelman MP. The Crossmans had two children, Patrick and Virginia.

== Legacy ==
The Richard Crossman Building, built in 1971, at Coventry University is named in his honour. Crossman's papers are at the Modern Records Centre, at the University of Warwick.

Richard Crossman features in the theatre production Little Edens, set during the Florence Park rent strike of 1934.

The former Labour MP Bryan Magee wrote in his autobiography Making the Most of It that Crossman was "the most brilliant debater I have heard".

== Published works ==
- Government and the Governed (A History of Political Ideas and Political Practice) London: Cristophers (1939)
- Plato To-Day New York: Oxford University Press (1937)
- Palestine Mission: A Personal Record New York: Harper (1947)
- The God That Failed New York: Harper (1949) (editor)
- The Charm of Politics, and other Essays in Political Criticism Hamish Hamilton (1958)
- A Nation Reborn: The Israel of Weizmann, Bevin and Ben-Gurion New York: Atheneum (1960)
- The Politics of Socialism New York: Atheneum (1965)
- The Myths of Cabinet Government Cambridge: Harvard University Press (1972)
- Diaries of a Cabinet Minister (three volumes, 1975, 1976 and 1977)
- The Crossman Diaries: Selections from the Diaries of a Cabinet Minister, 1964–1970 (1979) abridged edition, edited by Anthony Howard
- The Backbench Diaries of Richard Crossman (1981)

=== Biographies ===
- Anthony Howard (1990), Crossman: The Pursuit of Power, Jonathan Cape
- Tam Dalyell (1989), Dick Crossman: A Portrait
- Victoria Honeyman (2006), Richard Crossman; A Reforming Radical of the Labour Party, I.B. Tauris ISBN 978-1845115531

Parliament of the United Kingdom
New constituency	Member of Parliament for Coventry East; 1945–1974	Constituency abolished
Party political offices
Preceded by George Brinham	Chair of the National Executive Committee of the Labour Party; 1960–1961	Succeeded by Harold Wilson
Political offices
Preceded by Keith Joseph	Minister of Housing and Local Government; 1964–1966	Succeeded by Tony Greenwood
Preceded by Herbert Bowden	Lord President of the Council; 1966–1968	Succeeded by Fred Peart
Preceded by Herbert Bowden	Leader of the House of Commons; 1966–1968	Succeeded by Fred Peart
Preceded by Kenneth Robinson as Minister of Health	Secretary of State for Social Services; 1968–1970	Succeeded by Keith Joseph
Preceded by Judith Hart as Minister of Social Security	Secretary of State for Social Services; 1968–1970	Succeeded by Keith Joseph
Media offices
Preceded by Paul Johnson	Editor of the New Statesman; 1970–1972	Succeeded by Anthony Howard
