= German Concentration Camps Factual Survey =

1945 Holocaust documentary

- Written by: Richard Crossman; Colin Wills
- Produced by: Sidney Bernstein
- Narrated by: Jasper Britton
- Edited by: George Smith; Stewart McAllister; Peter Tanner; Marcel Cohen
- Production companies: Psychological Warfare Division; SHAEF
- Distributed by: British Film Institute; Imperial War Museum
- Release date: 1945
- Running time: 75 minutes
- Country: United Kingdom

German Concentration Camps Factual Survey is the official British documentary film on the Nazi concentration camps, based on footage shot by the Allied forces in 1945.

The film was produced by Sidney Bernstein, then with the British Ministry of Information, with Alfred Hitchcock acting as a "treatment advisor". The script was written by Richard Crossman and Colin Wills. Soviet filmmaker Sergei Nolbandov was production supervisor.

The British government shelved the film without showing it to the public, and questions have been raised about the extent to which political considerations, such as British concern about Zionism or changes in German occupation policy, may have played in the film being withheld.

The project was abandoned in September 1945, and the film was left unfinished for nearly seventy years. The film's restoration was completed by film scholars at the Imperial War Museum. The finished film had its world premiere early in 2014 at the Berlin Film Festival, and was shown in a limited number of venues in 2015. It was released in North America in 2017.

== Production history ==
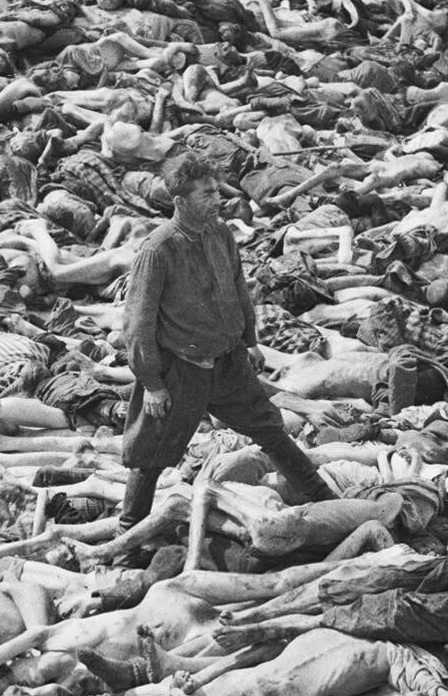
Fritz Klein, later executed for atrocities, amid a pile of victims at Belsen. He was interviewed for the documentary.

Sidney Bernstein, a cinema entrepreneur, had been an advisor to the Ministry of Information since 1940, and from 1942 onwards had been in charge of supply of British films to cinemas in areas freed from Axis control. Early in 1945, he began to make inquiries about the availability of Soviet films showing scenes of German atrocities.

Bernstein visited the Bergen-Belsen concentration camp on 22 April 1945, a week after it was liberated by British forces. What he saw there made him determined to make the film to show to German audiences. Production of the film was ordered by the Psychological Warfare Division (PWD) which was a unit of the Supreme Headquarters Allied Expeditionary Force (SHAEF). The PWD was responsible for the political activities in Germany of the British Ministry of Information and its U.S. counterpart, the Office of War Information. Bernstein began to assemble his film production team in April 1945. He and the U.S. Information Control Division were the driving forces behind the film in its early stages.

By the time Bernstein had visited Belsen, cameramen from the British Army Film and Photographic Unit had already been filming the early days of Belsen's liberation, including the capture of its commandant, Josef Kramer. Their films were recorded without sound. Recognizing the need to make the films as authentic as possible, he asked a newsreel cameraman from British Movietone News, who had sound equipment, to film interviews with British officials and members of the German SS. Among the German personnel interviewed by the newsreel cameramen were Fritz Klein, later executed for atrocities at Belsen. Klein was interviewed in front of a pile of bodies that included some of his victims.

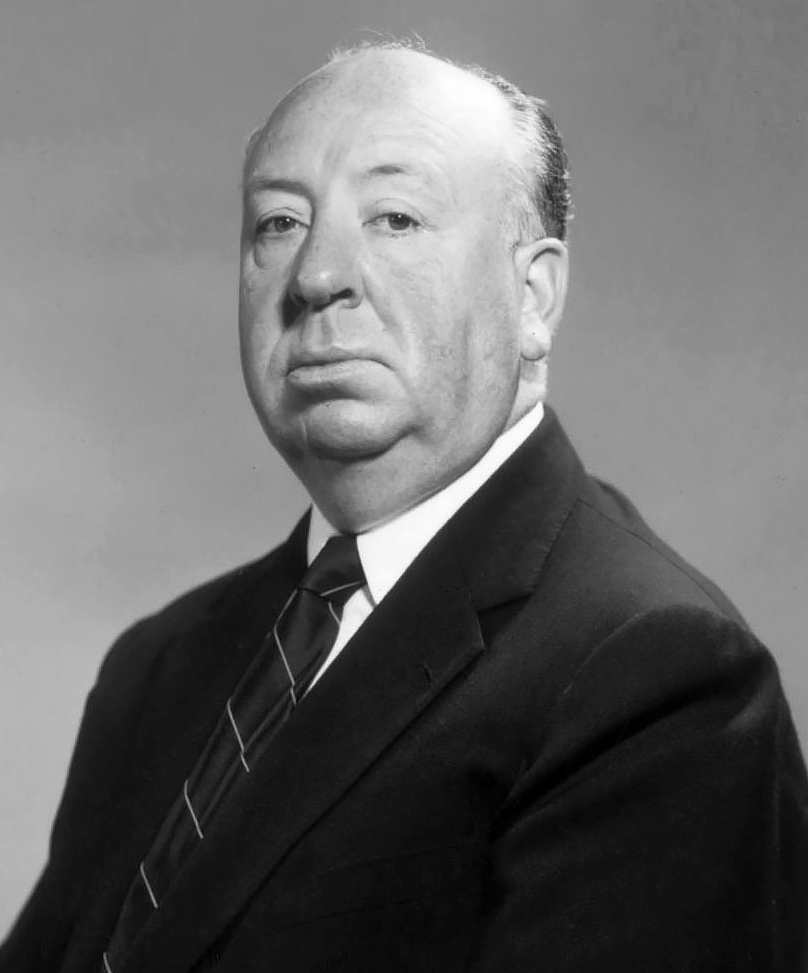
Alfred Hitchcock was involved in the production as an advisor.

The film eventually utilized both silent footage from combat cameramen in the armed services and sound footage from newsreel cameramen. Fourteen locations were covered by the film, including ten concentration camps and four locations where atrocities had taken place. Among the camps where footage was shot was Belsen, Dachau, Buchenwald, Auschwitz and Majdanek.

Bernstein's team included film editors Stewart McAllister, Peter Tanner, and Marcel Cohen, in addition to Crossman, Wills, and Bernstein's friend Alfred Hitchcock. Though Bernstein has described Hitchcock as the film's director, the Imperial War Museum describes Hitchcock as the film's "treatment advisor," noting that his one-month participation did not begin until after the footage was already shot and he was not involved in the rough cut of the film. Tanner also described Hitchcock as an advisor on the film and not as its director. Among the guidance Hitchcock provided was to recommend that the film avoid tricky editing to enhance its credibility, and to use wherever possible long shots and panning. He also recommended that German villagers be shown visiting the camps, and suggested showing scenes at Auschwitz showing piles of hair, wedding rings, spectacles and toothbrushes. Hitchcock told the filmmakers that these steps were necessary because many people would not believe the film and would accuse the Allies of faking the film.

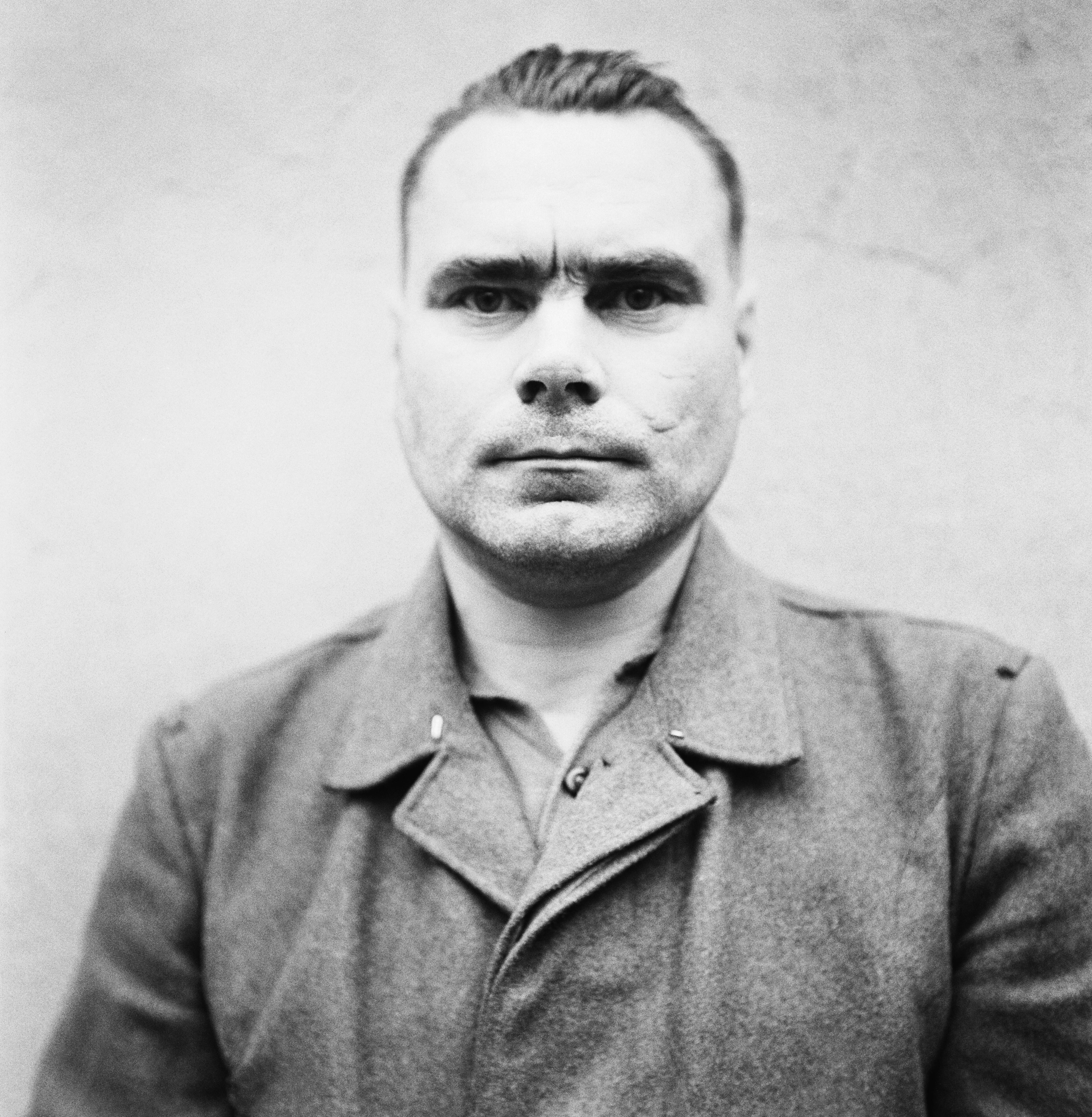
The film was evidence at the trial of Josef Kramer, the "Beast of Belsen."

After production commenced, film was continually flowing in from the front, as concentration camps were liberated. Ultimately the film incorporated the work of British, American and Soviet camera crews. Their cameras documented piles of dead, as well as starved survivors and burned remains in the ovens of the crematoria, and incorporated Hitchcock's suggestion by showing piles of victims' belongings, teeth, and bags of hair at the Majdanek camp. An immense pile of spectacles was accompanied by narration noting that perhaps one victim in ten wore spectacles.

No mention of the Holocaust was made in the production of the film, which might be attributed to the failure of the filmmakers to grasp the full scale of Adolf Hitler's Final Solution for Europe's Jews. PBS notes that a 1941 British Ministry of Information guideline advised war propagandists to deal with "the treatment of indisputably innocent people, not with violent political opponents and not with Jews," to make their work credible.

Footage from the documentary was used in the postwar prosecution of Nazi war criminals at Nuremberg and at Lüneburg, the site of the trial of Josef Kramer, the Belsen commandant known as the "Beast of Belsen". Kramer had claimed that he did not have sufficient food to feed the inmates, which was contradicted by the footage.

=== Shelving ===
A rough cut of five reels of the film was screened in September 1945, after which the film was shelved. The Imperial War Museum states that the project from the beginning was beset by "the practical difficulties of international co-operation and the realities of post-war shortages." As a result, the film was delayed "long enough to be overtaken by other events," including completion of two other concentration camp films and changes in occupation policy, "where the authorities no longer considered a one-hour compilation of atrocity material appropriate."

British concern about the growing Zionist movement has been cited as a reason for the shelving of the film. Also cited are U.S. Army slowness in providing footage and technical issues, such as the search for an editing machine. The U.S. withdrew from the project in July 1945, shortly before the Psychological Warfare Office and SHAEF were dissolved, leaving the British Ministry of Information in charge. The British military desire for a more congenial approach to relations with Germans and completion of other concentration camp documentaries were also reasons for it not being released. The result was that what had been envisioned originally as a joint project became two separate films: the British German Concentration Camps Factual Survey, which was not released, and Death Mills, directed by Billy Wilder, titled Die Todesmühlen in its German-language version, which had a different director and film editor.

Death Mills (1945)

Death Mills utilized the same footage, was shorter and was released in the American zone of occupation in January 1946. The Guardian describes the 22-minute Death Mills as very different to the "grieving meditation on inhumanity that Bernstein conceived."

As a result of the film's shelving, it did not receive the same acclaim as other documentaries on the Holocaust such as Claude Lanzmann’s Shoah (1985), Alain Resnais’ Night and Fog (1956), and Marcel Ophüls’ The Sorrow and the Pity (1969).

=== Abridged versions ===
Shortened versions of the film were released as Death Mills (Die Todesmühlen in its German version) in 1945, and Memory of the Camps (1984).

Footage from the film was used in the 1985 documentary A Painful Reminder, and in Night Will Fall (2014), which explored the making of the original 1945 film.

The first five reels of the film, which was originally to have been six reels in length, were shown at the Berlin International Film Festival in 1984, and in 1985, as an episode "Memory of the Camps" on the PBS series Frontline, with Trevor Howard as narrator. However, that version of the film had no synch sound, as well as being incomplete.

Footage from the film was also incorporated in a number of other films and broadcasts over the years.

== Restoration ==
The Imperial War Museum took possession of the rough cut, consisting of five reels of the film, in 1952. The museum also received 100 reels of footage, a script for the narration, and a shot list for completion of the film.

Work to restore and complete the film commenced after it became apparent that the popular documentary Memory of the Camps (PBS, 1984) needed restoration. The Imperial War Museum decided to complete the original 1945 documentary instead. Work began in December 2008, using the filmmakers' rough cut, script and shot list, and the footage was digitalized by a post-production facility in Wales.

The missing sixth reel was reconstructed utilizing the original shot list. All scenes were located except for two maps, one of which was replaced by a new one. The original narration was spoken by actor Jasper Britton, and sound effects were added from the museum's resources. Its world premiere was at the 2014 Berlin International Film Festival.

Digitizing the film had the effect of transforming "the grainy past into a vivid present."

The restored film was scheduled to be screened in January 2015 at the Metropolis Kino in Hamburg, the Danish Film Institute in Copenhagen, the Museum of Tolerance in Los Angeles, and the Holocaust Memorial Museum of San Antonio, Texas. Cinema screenings in the United Kingdom, commencing in April 2015 at BFI Southbank in London, were planned. The film also was to be screened at the San Francisco Jewish Film Festival in July 2015 and the Holocaust & Human Rights Educator Conference in Dallas in August 2015.

In January 2015 it was disclosed that German Concentration Camps Factual Survey was to go into general release to the public sometime during the year, either on DVD or in theaters.

Memory of the Camps was due to be shown on the American PBS program Frontline on 14 April 2015, and is available for viewing on the Frontline website.

=== 2017 North American release ===
The film production company 3 Generations, founded by Sidney Bernstein's daughter Jane Wells, was granted screening rights to German Concentration Camps Factual Survey for North America and Puerto Rico. The film premiered in New York City on 6 January 2017. The restored film, 75 minutes in length, is bookended by a brief introduction and postscript.

In a review of the restored film narrated by actor Jasper Britton, The New York Times called it "an extraordinary act of cinematic reclamation and historiography." Times' film critic Manohla Dargis said that "the film can seem shocking but not surprising, simply because such imagery has been so thoroughly incorporated into pop culture, either through direct citation or by inference." But the "troubling sense of familiarity soon dissipates ... because this is not like most films." Unlike many films on the subject, there are no heroics or "hollow claims about the 'triumph' of the human spirit. ... The few smiles here are desperate. Mostly, there are starving survivors milling about the camps and staring into the camera with hollow eyes."

== Night Will Fall ==
A 70-minute documentary on the making of the 1945 film, entitled Night Will Fall, was assembled from the partially finished material and new original footage by director Andre Singer and producers Sally Angel and Brett Ratner. It includes about 12 minutes of footage from the 1945 documentary. Helena Bonham Carter was narrator. The title of the film was derived from a line of narration in the 1945 documentary: "Unless the world learns the lesson these pictures teach, night will fall."

The 2014 documentary was released at a number of film festivals, including the 2014 Berlin International Film Festival, and was shown along with the 1945 documentary at the Jerusalem Film Festival in July 2014. Night Will Fall was broadcast on major television networks around the world, including HBO in the United States, the week of 27 January 2015, Holocaust Remembrance Day and the 70th anniversary of the liberation of Auschwitz concentration camp.

The New York Times, in its review of the documentary, said that "what the new film accomplishes, more than anything else, is to make you wish you could see the original."

== See also ==
- List of Holocaust films
