= Tricked (film) =

- Film poster
- Directed by: John-Keith Wasson; Jane I. Wells
- Written by: Jane I. Wells; John-Keith Wasson
- Produced by: Jane I. Wells; Christina Ljunberg
- Cinematography: John-Keith Wasson
- Edited by: Craig McKay; A.C.E. Beth Moran; Francesco Portinari
- Music by: Wendy Blackstone
- Production company: 3 Generations
- Distributed by: First Run Features
- Release date: December 13, 2013 (New York City)
- Running time: 75 minutes
- Country: United States
- Language: English

Tricked: The Documentary is a 2013 American documentary film directed by John-Keith Wasson and Jane Wells. It documents human sex trafficking, and its presence within the United States, from the perspectives of the victims involved in sex trafficking, the “johns” who pay for the sex and the pimps responsible for instigating the illegal business. It was produced by 3 Generations and distributed by First Run Features in Canada and the United States.

In addition to the various people interviewed in this documentary, the film follows law enforcement agencies and their efforts to crack down on this illegal enterprise, such as Sgt. Dan Steele of the Denver vice squad. The film is meant not only to educate people on trafficking, but to help them understand and spot the scouting and manipulating techniques commonly used by traffickers.

Filming for Tricked took place in New York City, Las Vegas, Denver, Chicago and Washington D.C. It premiered on December 13, 2013, at the Quad Cinema in New York City.It was also selected for screening at the 2014 Montclair Film Festival.

== Production ==
Tricked is an initiative of 3 Generations, a 501(c)3 not-for-profit organization. Tricked is the third film that 3 Generations has made.

The idea for making the film Tricked came in 2010, when director Jane Wells read an article about sex traffickers coercing women into going with them to Miami, where the Super Bowl was presently being held. She explained "that headline caught my eye so I started investigating the subject and interviewing survivors. I gradually came to realize just how big a story sex trafficking is."

The National Center for Missing and Exploited Children eventually claimed that during that Super Bowl 10,000 women and children were trafficked there for sex.

== Reception ==
Tricked: The Documentary received generally positive reviews from critics, having a 71% Fresh rating on Rotten Tomatoes based on seven reviews. Jay Weston of The Huffington Post called it a “brilliant, horrifying film.” Slant Magazine called it "quite impressive in its scope and detail."

Film Journal International said, "A sobering portrait of the scourge that dares not speak its name, 'Tricked' deserves its own hybrid classification: the horror documentary." The Hollywood Reporter said it "effectively argues for a smarter approach to prostitution." While The New York Times explained that "Tricked . . . presents the sexual exploitation of young women as a systemic cancer that feeds on public misconception as much as male appetites . . . a film that tenderly details [survivors'] experiences, it was somewhat, however, more critical."

The reviewer Jeanette Catsoulis of The New York Times recommended the making of a sequel, adding that, with regards to the people involved, the film “tenderly details their experiences but leaves topics like poverty, lack of parental insight, childhood damage and low self-esteem off the table- more than enough for a sequel.” Russell Simmons of Def Jam Records calls it “eye-opening, a shocking revelation of what happens in the streets every night in cities across the country.” There was also much praise from victims within the sex trafficking community. Danielle Douglas, a sex trafficking survivor, stated, "I am so grateful to have had this opportunity with 3 Generations. Not only does 3 Generations tell my story accurately and honestly, they do it with the drive for awareness and support."
