= The Essential Gandhi =

1962 book edited by Louis Fischer

- First edition cover
- Editor: Louis Fischer
- Author: Mahatma Gandhi; Eknath Easwaran (preface, 2nd edition)
- Language: English
- Genre: Biography; Essay
- Publisher: Allen & Unwin
- Publication date: September 14, 1962
- Publication place: United Kingdom
- Media type: Print
- Pages: xxvi, 338 pp
- ISBN: 1-4000-3050-1 (reprint)
- OCLC: 51073482
- Dewey Decimal: 954.03/5/092 B 22
- LC Class: DS481.G3 A3 2002b

The Essential Gandhi: An Anthology of His Writings on His Life, Work, and Ideas is a collection of Mohandas Gandhi's writings, edited by Louis Fischer and published by Random House in 1962. The book outlines how Gandhi became the Mahatma and introduces Gandhi's opinions on various subjects. It is split into two parts, "The Man" and "The Mahatma".
