= The God that Failed =

1949 collection of anti-communist essays

- First edition
- Publisher: Harper & Brothers
- Publication date: 1949

The God That Failed is a 1949 collection of six essays by Louis Fischer, André Gide, Arthur Koestler, Ignazio Silone, Stephen Spender, and Richard Wright. The common theme of the essays is the authors' disillusionment with and abandonment of communism.

== Essays ==
The book was conceived and edited by Richard Crossman, a member of parliament for the British Labour Party. It contains Fischer's definition of "Kronstadt" as the moment in which some communists or fellow travellers decide not just to leave the Communist Party but to oppose it as anti-communists. Crossman said in the book's introduction: "The Kronstadt rebels called for Soviet power free from Bolshevik dominance" (p. x). After describing the actual Kronstadt rebellion, Fischer spent many pages applying the concept to some subsequent former communists –including himself: "What counts decisively is the 'Kronstadt'. Until its advent, one may waver emotionally or doubt intellectually or even reject the cause altogether in one's mind and yet refuse to attack it. I had no 'Kronstadt' for many years". (p. 204) Writers who subsequently picked up the term have included Whittaker Chambers, Clark Kerr, David Edgar, William F. Buckley, Jr., and Norman Podhoretz.

While preparing the book, Crossman also approached the famous American ex-communist Whittaker Chambers about contributing an essay. However, Chambers was still employed by Time magazine at the time, having not yet gone public with his charges against Alger Hiss, and so declined to participate.

== See also ==
- The Black Book of Communism – 1997 book by Stéphane Courtois and others
- Democracy: The God That Failed—2001 book by Hans-Hermann Hoppe
