= La Bohème (2009 film) =

- Directed by: Werner Herzog
- Written by: Giuseppe Giacosa; Luigi Illica
- Produced by: André Singer
- Starring: Peter Auty; Mary Plazas
- Cinematography: Richard Blanshard
- Edited by: Joe Bini
- Music by: Giacomo Puccini
- Distributed by: Sky Arts
- Release date: September 5, 2009 (Venice)
- Running time: 4 1/2 minutes
- Language: Italian

La Bohème is a 2009 short film directed by Werner Herzog. The four-minute film features images of life in Ethiopia set to the duet "O soave fanciulla" from Puccini's opera La bohème, sung by Peter Auty and Mary Plazas. It was part of a series of short films commissioned by Sky Arts and English National Opera.

== Cast ==
- Peter Auty as Rodolfo (voice)
- Mary Plazas as Mimi (voice)
