= George Brinham =

British trade unionist (1916–1962)

George Ivor Brinham (1916 – 17 November 1962) was a British trade unionist.

Brinham was born in Brixham in Devon. He left school at the age of fifteen and completed an apprenticeship as a joiner, becoming a member of the Amalgamated Society of Woodworkers (ASW). Brinham also became active in the Labour Party, and was soon elected as secretary of its Torquay division.

In 1947, Brinham was elected to the executive of the ASW, and in 1956 he became the union's youngest ever chairman. From 1952 to 1954, he also served on the Confederation of Shipbuilding and Engineering Unions. He was known for being on the right wing of the trade union movement, and was considered a poor public speaker, but came to prominence through his hard work on committees.

In 1953, Brinham was elected to the National Executive Committee of the Labour Party, where he strongly supported Hugh Gaitskell. In 1959/60, he was chair of the party, during which time he arranged for the formation of a youth section, the Young Socialists. The following year, he was a leading figure in the movement to reverse the party's unilateralist nuclear disarmament policy.

Brinham was killed in 1962 while at home, by an eighteen-year-old man, Thomas Somers, who hit him with a decanter. Somers claimed that Brinham had made "homosexual advances" toward him. At the subsequent trial on 21 January 1963, Mr Justice Paull directed the jury to find Somers not guilty of murder, stating that "...this man attempted to make homosexual advances... I think that is about as clear a case of provocation as it is possible to have". Somers was also found not guilty of manslaughter, and was discharged.

== See also ==
- Gay panic defense

Party political offices
Preceded by Barbara Castle	Chairman of the Labour Party; 1959–1960	Succeeded by Richard Crossman
