= Jane I. Wells =

American documentary filmmaker and activist

The Honourable Jane I. Bernstein Wells
- Occupations: Documentary filmmaker Activist

Jane I. Bernstein Wells is a documentary filmmaker and activist whose films focus on global human rights and social justice issues. She has produced over 40 short films including the award-winning shorts I'm a Victim, Not a Criminal (2010), Lost Hope (2012) and Native Silence (2013). She is also a producer of the feature documentary films The Devil Came on Horseback (2007), Tricked (2013), A Different American Dream (2016), Lost in Lebanon (2017), and HERE LIVED! (2024).

== Career ==
In 2005 Wells became involved with The Devil Came on Horseback a feature-length documentary about the genocide in Darfur. Ultimately she became a producer of the film, travelling to Darfur with her son to bear witness to the state of affairs.

In 2007, she founded 3 Generations, a non-profit organization that uses film to document stories of witness to crimes against humanity, through documentary film, oral history, witness testimony and creative writing. Wells' articles on genocide and human rights have appeared in British Vogue, Diversion and Weston. She is a regular guest blogger on the Huffington Post and the HUB.

Wells has said that making films that document crimes against humanity is “deeply connected to the family heritage”. Her father, Sidney Bernstein, filmed the liberation of concentration camps at the end of World War II. Wells has said that it was her father's greatest regret that the footage was never shown publicly, as he hoped it would serve as evidence for mankind of these atrocities.
