= Louis Fischer =

American journalist (1896–1970)

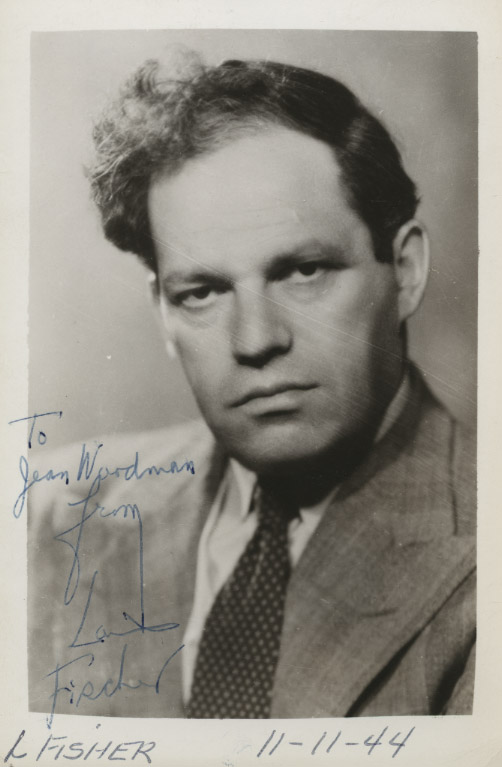
- Fischer in 1944
- Born: February 29, 1896; Philadelphia, Pennsylvania, U.S.
- Died: January 15, 1970 (aged 73); Princeton, New Jersey, U.S.

Louis Fischer (29 February 1896 – 15 January 1970) was an American journalist. Among his works were a contribution to the ex-communist treatise The God that Failed (1949), The Life of Mahatma Gandhi (1950), basis for the Academy Award-winning film Gandhi (1982), as well as a Life of Lenin, which won the 1965 National Book Award in History and Biography.

== Biography ==
=== Early life ===
Louis Fischer, the son of a fish peddler, was born in Philadelphia on 29 February 1896. After studying at the Philadelphia School of Pedagogy from 1914 to 1916, he became a school teacher.

In 1917, Fischer, a supporter of Zionism when he was younger, joined the Jewish Legion, a military unit based in Palestine. On his return to the United States, Fischer took up work at a news agency in New York City and met Bertha "Markoosha" Mark (1890-1977). In 1921, when Bertha went to work in Berlin, Fischer joined her a few months later and began contributing to the New York Evening Post as a European correspondent. The following year, he moved to Moscow and married Bertha. In 1923 their first son George was born (followed by Victor a year later) and Fischer began working for The Nation. He also served as a volunteer in the British Army between 1918 and 1920.

While in the Soviet Union, Fischer published several books including Oil Imperialism: The International Struggle for Petroleum (1926) and The Soviets in World Affairs (1930).

In 1934, American Max Eastman criticized Fischer for Stalinism in a chapter called "The 'Revolution' of April 23, 1932" in his book Artists in Uniform. In 1938, Leon Trotsky described Fischer as a "merchant of lies" and "direct literary agent of Stalin".

Fischer also covered the Spanish Civil War and for a time was a member of the International Brigade fighting General Francisco Franco. In 1938, he returned to the United States and settled in New York. He continued to work for The Nation and wrote his autobiography, Men and Politics (1941). Viktor Fischer, Louis Fischer's son, was a close friend of Lothar Wloch (1923–1976), the son of Wilhelm Wloch and "Koni" Konrad Wolf who was the Stasi spy master Markus Wolf's brother and uncle of Franz Wolf, who is very close to Vladimir Putin. In 1989, Markus Wolf wrote about the three friends Koni, Vik, and Lothar in The Troika.

Fischer left The Nation in 1945 after a dispute with the editor, Freda Kirchwey, over the journal's sympathetic reporting of Joseph Stalin. His disillusionment with communism, although he had never been a member of the Communist Party USA, was reflected in his contribution to The God That Failed (1949). Fischer began writing for anti-communist liberal magazines such as The Progressive. Fischer taught about the Soviet Union at Princeton University until his death on January 15, 1970.

=== Denial of the Soviet famine of 1932–33 ===
Fischer traveled to Ukraine in October and November 1932 for The Nation, and was alarmed at what he saw. "In the Poltava, Vinnitsa, Podolia and Kiev regions, conditions will be hard," he wrote, "I think there is no starvation anywhere in Ukraine now — after all they have just gathered in the harvest, but it was a bad harvest."

Initially critical of the Soviet grain procurement program because it created the food problem, Fischer by February 1933 adopted the official Soviet government view, which blamed the problem on Ukrainian counter-revolutionary nationalist "wreckers." It seemed "whole villages" had been "contaminated" by such men, who had to be deported to "lumbering camps and mining areas in distant agricultural areas which are now just entering upon their pioneering stage." These steps were forced upon the Kremlin, Fischer wrote, but the Soviets were, nevertheless, learning how to rule wisely.

In 1935 Fischer accused the Hearst press of attempting to "spoil Soviet-American relations" by running "an anti-red campaign". The Hearst titles had been citing the eyewitness reports of famine by the "Red" labor organizer Fred Beal, and the Welsh freelancer Gareth Jones, both recently returned from Soviet Ukraine. To make the reports of what has been since referred to as the Holodomor better serve their editorial line against Roosevelt's recognition of the Soviet Union (for which Fischer had campaigned), the Hearst writer, Thomas Walker, brought the famine forward from 1932–1933 into the current year. Having been to Ukraine in the spring of 1934, in The Nation Fisher could confidently report that he saw no famine and he accused Walker of pure invention.

When asked on a lecture tour of the United States about earlier reports of a million having died in Kazakhstan he said:

Who counted them? How could anyone march through a country and count a million people? Of course people are hungry--desperately hungry. Russia is turning over from agriculture to industrialism. It is like a man going into business on small capital.

Myra Page was clear that Fischer knew that, in the wake of Stalin's collectivization and grain seizures, there had been mass starvation. He had discussed the famine with her in Moscow in 1933, and indeed tried to persuade her "to go down to the Ukraine" and see for herself. She and her husband, John Markey, refused to believe him. "We didn't know about the horrors of collectivization because we chose not to know."

In his essay for the collection The God that Failed, published in 1949, Fischer would go on to state that the policy of collectivization in Ukraine “produced the famine of 1931-32, which killed several million people”.

=== Gandhi and Stalin (1947) ===
In Gandhi and Stalin, Fischer relates Mahatma Gandhi's response to the question of how pacifists should respond to the persecution of Jews in Nazi Germany. Fischer describes Gandhi as arguing in 1938 that German Jews ought to commit collective suicide in order to raise awareness of Nazi abuses, and continuing to believe after the Second World War that this would have been the right path. George Orwell described Fischer as a "warm ... admirer" of Gandhi, but suggested Fischer was nonetheless "staggered" by Gandhi's argument in this case.

== Personal life ==
George Fischer and Viktor Fischer were his sons.

== Works ==
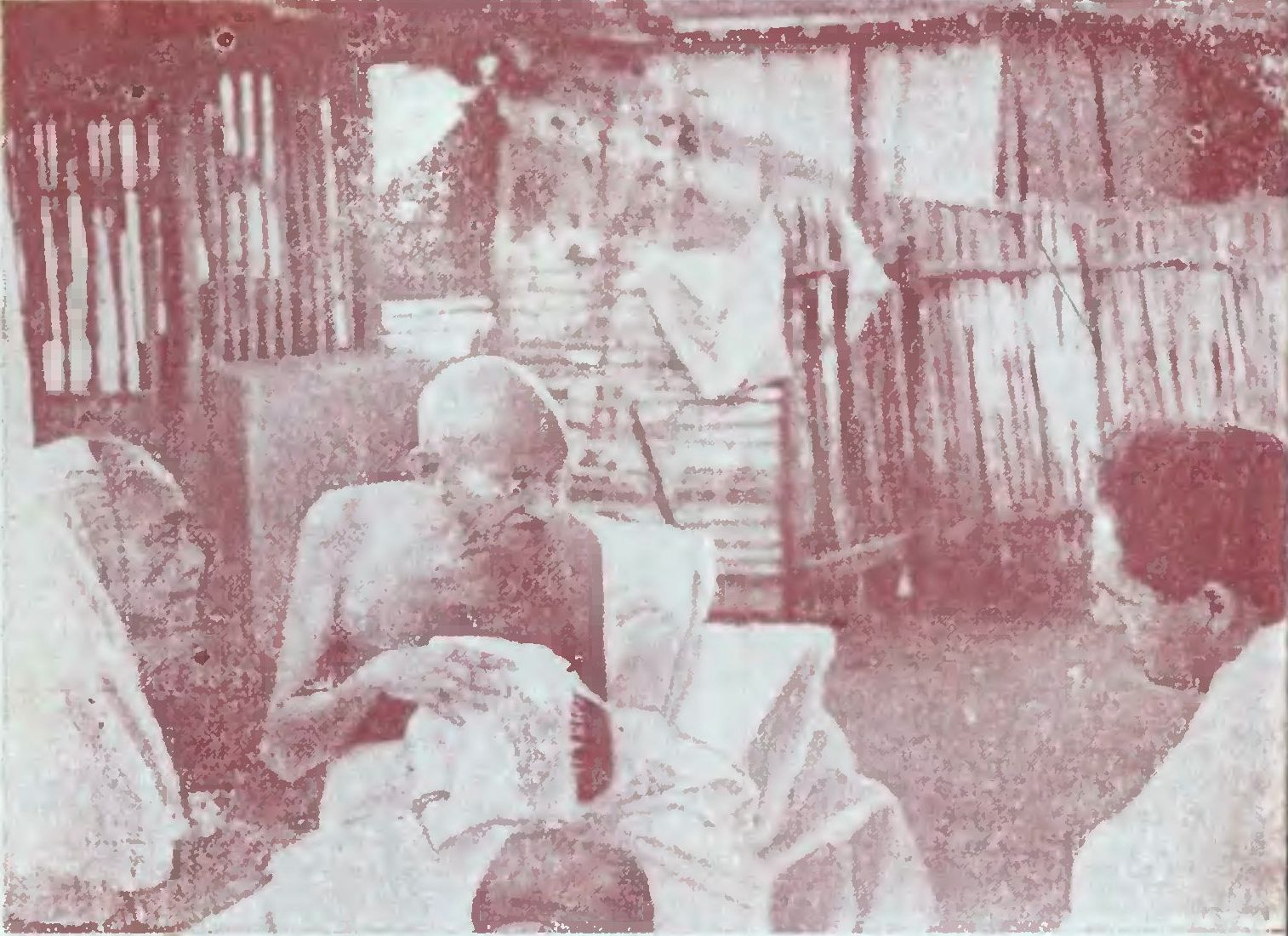
Cover New Outlook (1949)

- Oil Imperialism: The International Struggle for Petroleum (1926)
- The Soviets in World Affairs Volume I Volume II (1930)
- The War in Spain (1937)
- Men and Politics (autobiography) (1941)
- Gandhi & Stalin (1947)
- The God that Failed (contribution) (1949)
- The Life of Mahatma Gandhi (1950)
- The Life and Death of Stalin (1952)
- Russia Revisited: A New Look at Russia and Her Satellites (1957)
- The Story of Indonesia (1959)
- The Essential Gandhi (editor) (1962)
- The Life of Lenin (1964)
- Russia's Road from Peace to War (1969)

== Sources ==
- Wolf, Markus (January 1, 1989). Die Troika: Geschichte eines Nichtgedrehten Films [The Troika: The Story of a Non-Made Film] (in German). Aufbau-Verlag. ISBN 978-3546498395.
