= Colin Wills =

Australian journalist, and poet

- Born: Colin Frederick George Wills; January 17, 1906; Toowoomba, Queensland, Australia
- Died: 1965 (aged 58–59); Westminster, London, England
- Occupations: Journalist, Poet, Broadcaster, War Correspondent, Scriptwriter, Travel Writer
- Writing career
- Period: 1920s–1960s
- Genres: Poetry, Non-fiction, War reporting, Documentary script
- Subjects: Travel, Africa, Australia, World War II

Colin Frederick George Wills (17 January 1906 – 1965) was an Australian journalist, poet, broadcaster, war correspondent, scriptwriter and travel writer.

== Background ==
Born in Toowoomba, Queensland, Wills grew up on the North Shore of Sydney. During the 1920s and 1930s he worked as a reporter for the Daily Guardian, Smith's Weekly and the Daily Telegraph.

In 1933, he published a collection of poetry with illustrations by the cartoonist "WEP" (William Pidgeon): Rhymes of Sydney.

Wills left Australia in 1939, to work as a journalist and broadcaster in Europe.

During World War II, Wills reported from front-line areas for outlets including the BBC, Chronicle and Mirror. His assignments included the North African campaign and D-Day, which Wills covered from a landing craft, as it carried Canadian soldiers to Juno Beach, in Normandy. He visited Belsen concentration camp, in north-west Germany, soon after it was liberated by Allied forces.

In mid-1945 Wills and Richard Crossman wrote the script of German Concentration Camps Factual Survey, a feature-length documentary about the Nazi concentration camps. The de facto co-directors of the film were Alfred Hitchcock (who was credited as a "treatment advisor") and Sergei Nolbandov ("production supervisor"). Post-production was halted for political reasons after several months and the film was not completed and released until 2014.

Wills later authored three non-fiction books: White Traveller in Black Africa (1951), Who Killed Kenya? (1953) and Australian Passport (1953), all of which were published in London by Dennis Dobson Ltd. Australian Passport combined autobiography with social commentary regarding Australia.

He died at Westminster, London, in 1965.
