= A Different American Dream =

- Directed by: Simon Brook
- Written by: Simon Brook; Jane I. Wells
- Produced by: Jane I. Wells
- Cinematography: Philippe Dorelli
- Edited by: Barbara Bossuet; Josie Miljevic
- Production company: 3 Generations
- Release date: 2016
- Running time: 84 minutes
- Country: United States
- Language: English

A Different American Dream is a 2016 American documentary film by Simon Brook and Jane I. Wells. It was produced by 3 Generations and Brook Productions. In 2016, the film was selected for a number of festivals, including the Thessaloniki International Film Festival, the Margaret Mead Film Festival and the Reykjavík International Film Festival.

== Synopsis ==
The documentary focuses on the inhabitants of the Fort Berthold Indian Reservation in the Badlands of North Dakota as their lives, their communities and their environment are profoundly transformed by the tight oil (shale oil) industry that promises wealth but sometimes delivers devastation.
