= Stafford Crossman =

English barrister and High Court judge

Sir Stafford Crossman

Justice of the High Court
- In office 1934–1941
- Preceded by: Sir Frederic Maugham

Personal details
- Born: Charles Stafford Crossman; 8 December 1870
- Died: 1 January 1941 (aged 70) Tetbury, Gloucestershire, England
- Education: Winchester College; New College, Oxford

Sir Charles Stafford Crossman (8 December 1870 – 1 January 1941) was an English barrister and High Court judge, who sat in the Chancery Division of the High Court from 1934 to 1941. He was the father of Labour politician Richard Crossman.

== Biography ==
The third son of Dr Edward Crossman, MD, Crossman was educated at Winchester College, where he was a scholar, and New College, Oxford, where was a scholar and where he took first-class honours in honour moderations and literae humaniores, in addition of winning the Hertford scholarship in 1890. After Oxford, he returned to Winchester as an assistant master for a year.

He was called the bar by Lincoln's Inn in 1897. After acquiring a large practice, Crossman was junior counsel to the Board of Inland Revenue in 1926–27, junior equity counsel to the Treasury in 1927–34, and counsel to the Royal College of Physicians in 1927–34.

In 1934, while still at the junior bar, he was appointed to the High Court of Justice in succession to Mr Justice Maugham. He was assigned to the Chancery Division and received the customary knighthood. On the bench, he was styled judicially as The Hon. Mr. Justice Crossman. Crossman sat on the High Court until his death in Tetbury, Gloucestershire, on 1 January 1941.

The Labour politician Tam Dalyell wrote that Crossman was "perhaps the most distinguished, if driest, Chancery Judge of his generation". Less fulsomely, his obituary in The Times described his law on the Bench as sound and his manner courteous and pleasant.

== Personal life ==
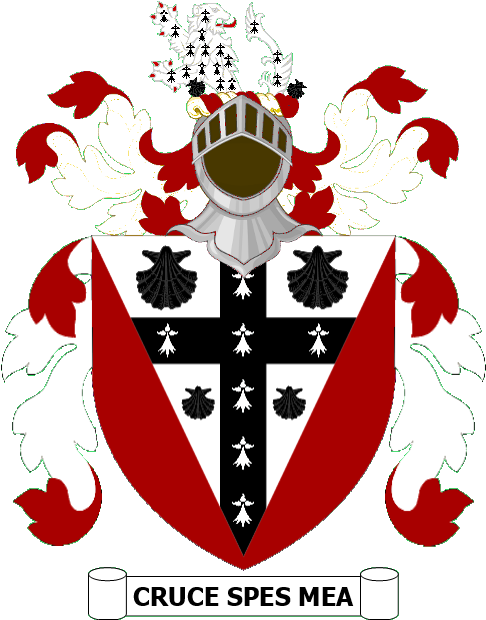
Arms as displayed at Lincoln's Inn

Crossman married Helen Elizabeth Howard, the daughter of chemicals manufacturer David Howard, DL, in 1902; they had three sons and three daughters. The Labour politician Richard Crossman was his son. Another son, Flying Officer Thomas Edward Crossman, was killed on active service in May 1940.

Although a Conservative politically, Crossman was a close friend of future Labour prime minister Clement Attlee. Richard Crossman was later apt to ascribe Attlee's suspicion of him to the fact that he caused his father distress by becoming a socialist.
