= Victoria Honeyman =

British politics academic

Victoria C. Honeyman (born 1978) is a British politics academic, and associate professor of British Politics at the University of Leeds.

She has a Ph.D. from the University of Leeds, and her thesis Richard Crossman: a critical biography (2005) was published as Richard Crossman: A Reforming Radical of the Labour Party by I.B. Tauris. She specialises in British politics and in particular on British foreign relations. She has written on foreign policy issues in The Independent and for UK in a Changing Europe.

She is a fellow of the Royal Historical Society.

== Selected publications ==
- Honeyman, Victoria (2012). "Foreign Policy". In Heppell, T; Seabright, D (eds.). Cameron and the Conservatives : the transition to coalition government. Houndmills, Basingstoke, Hampshire: Palgrave Macmillan. pp. 121–135. ISBN 978-0-230-36748-7.
- Dorey, Peter; Honeyman, Victoria (June 2010). "Ahead of his time: Richard Crossman and House of Commons reform in the 1960s". British Politics. 5 (2): 149–178. doi:10.1057/bp.2010.3. S2CID 154448043.
- Honeyman, Victoria (February 2009). "Gordon Brown and international policy". Policy Studies. 30 (1): 85–100. doi:10.1080/01442870802576256. S2CID 154406338.
- Honeyman, Victoria (2007). Richard Crossman : a reforming radical of the Labour Party. London: I.B. Tauris. ISBN 9781845115531.
