= The Devil Came on Horseback =

- Theatrical release poster
- Directed by: Ricki Stern; Anne Sundberg
- Written by: Ricki Stern; Anne Sundberg
- Produced by: Jane Wells, Gretchen Wallace
- Starring: Brian Steidle
- Cinematography: Phil Cox; Tim Hetherington; William Rexer; Jerry Risius; Anne Sundberg; John Keith Wasson
- Edited by: Joey Grossfield
- Music by: Paul Brill
- Production company: Break Thru Films
- Distributed by: International Film Circuit
- Release date: January 19, 2007 (Sundance Film Festival)
- Running time: 85 minutes
- Country: United States
- Language: English

The Devil Came on Horseback is a documentary film by Ricki Stern and Anne Sundberg illustrating the continuing Darfur Conflict in Sudan. Based on the book by former U.S. Marine Captain Brian Steidle and his experiences while working for the African Union. The film asks viewers to become educated about the ongoing genocide in Darfur and laments the failure of the US and others to end the crisis.

== Details ==
It is a Break Thru Films production in association with Global Grassroots and 3 Generations.

It premiered at Sundance Film Festival in 2007, was screened at the Laemmle Music Hall on Wilshire Blvd. in Los Angeles in June 2007 and opened its nationwide release at the IFC New York in July 2007. It was released on DVD on 30 October 2007.

== Awards ==
- Index on Censorship Film Award, Freedom of Expression Award 2009, Index on Censorship.

== Book ==
The book version is by Brian Steidle with his sister, Gretchen Steidle Wallace.
