= Meeting Gorbachev =

2018 film

- Film poster
- Directed by: Werner Herzog; André Singer
- Produced by: Svetlana Palmer; Lucki Stipetic
- Cinematography: Richard Blanshard; Yuri Barak
- Edited by: Michael Ellis
- Music by: Nicholas Singer
- Production companies: History Films; Mitteldeutscher Rundfunk; Spring Films; Werner Herzog Film
- Distributed by: The Orchard (North America); Altitude Film Distribution (United Kingdom and Ireland); A&E Networks (International)
- Release date: September 1, 2018 (US)
- Running time: 90 minutes
- Countries: United Kingdom; United States; Germany
- Languages: English; Russian; German; Polish
- Box office: $252,203

Meeting Gorbachev is a 2018 biographical documentary film directed by Werner Herzog and André Singer about the life of Mikhail Gorbachev, the eighth and last leader of the Soviet Union. The film features three interviews between Herzog and Gorbachev, conducted over the span of six months, and had its world premiere at the Telluride Film Festival on September 1, 2018.

The film ends with Gorbachev reciting the poem "I Go Out On The Road Alone" by Mikhail Lermontov.

== Release ==
The film premiered at the Telluride Film Festival on September 1, 2018. It was then screened at the Toronto International Film Festival on September 10, 2018, where it received wider press coverage.

=== Critical reception ===
On review aggregator website Rotten Tomatoes, the film holds an approval rating of 86% based on 77 reviews, and an average rating of 7.1/10. The site's critical consensus reads, "Meeting Gorbachev plays to filmmaker Werner Herzog's endlessly inquisitive strengths -- and reveals the fascinating story of a pivotal political figure." David Ehrlich of IndieWire "ultimately because of Gorbachev's seeming unwillingness to fit the director's usual mold that Meeting Gorbachev is able to become such a different and engaging bio-doc." While overall positive, Jessica Kiang of Variety criticized the film, saying that the film, "though consistently engaging, is less a fireworks display than a fireside chat, and so feels curiously like an opportunity missed."
