= André Singer (producer) =

British documentary film-maker and an anthropologist

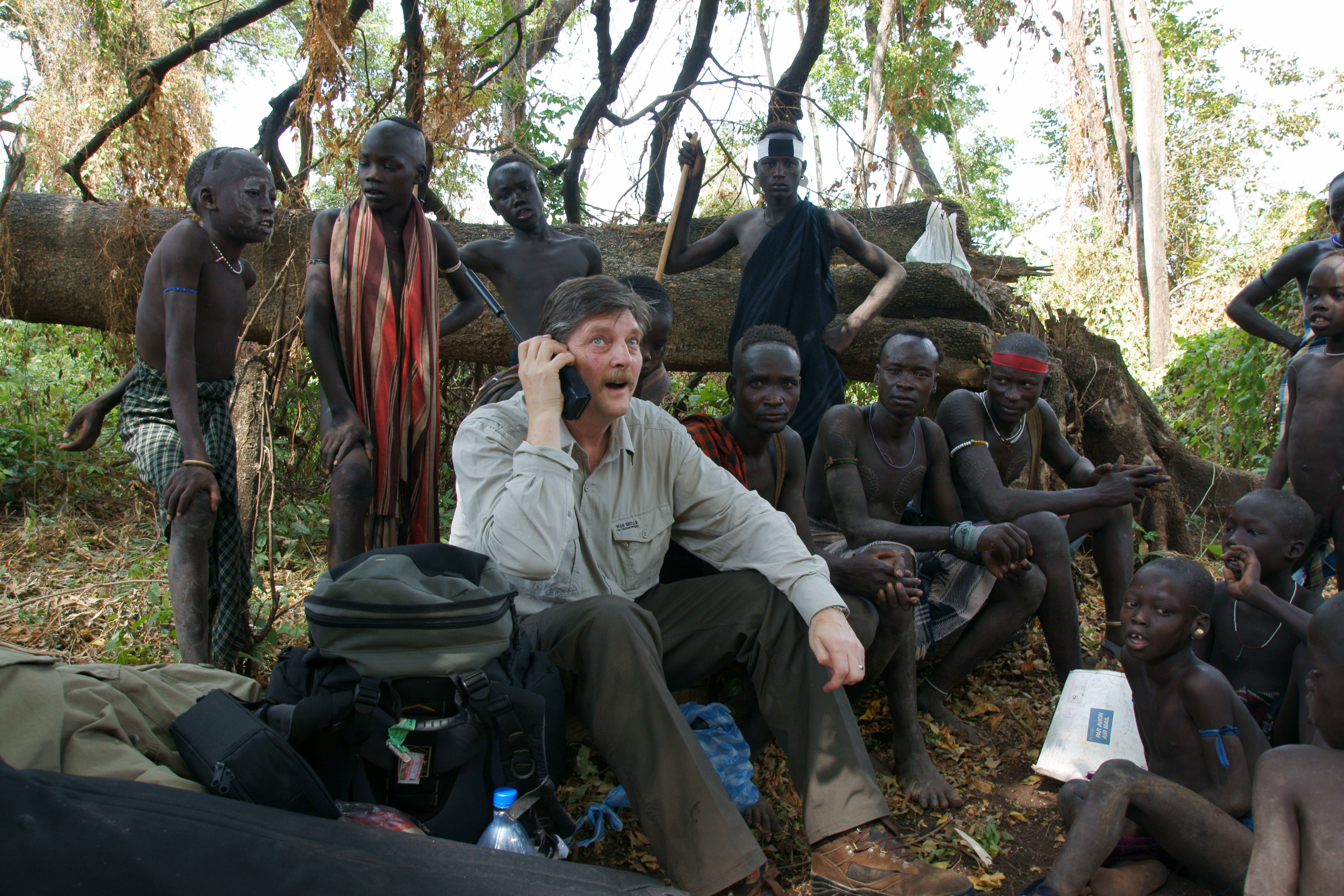
André Singer in Ethiopia with the Mursi 2008

André Felix Vitus Singer OBE FRAI is a British documentary filmmaker and an anthropologist. He is an Executive Producer and Emeritus President of the Royal Anthropological Institute of Great Britain and Ireland where he was President from 2014 to 2018.

Born in London, he studied at University Hall, Buckland, then at Keble College, and subsequently at Exeter College, both at Oxford University, under Professor Sir Edward Evans-Pritchard, specialising in Iran and Afghanistan for his doctorate. He started working in television in the early 1970s as a researcher, then as a producer and director for the Disappearing World series at Granada Television, eventually taking over from Brian Moser as the Series Editor.

== Biography ==
His wife is anthropologist and writer Lynette Singer.

As a director, Singer has made many award–winning films, including the Strangers Abroad series, Khyber, Night Will Fall, Where the Wind Blew, Meeting Gorbachev with Werner Herzog, and Witchcraft Among the Azande. In television he has worked for several broadcasters, serving as Commissioning editor for Discovery Channel, Europe; Senior Vice-President for Alliance Atlantis; and heading the Independent Documentary Unit at the BBC.

At the BBC, he founded and commissioned works for the Fine Cut series (which later became 'Storyville'), working with such international filmmakers as Jean Rouch, Werner Herzog, D.A. Pennebaker, Bob Drew, Fred Wiseman and Vikram Jayanti.

In the independent sector, Singer has been instrumental in several production companies including InCa, Café Productions, West Park Pictures and Spring Films. He has been responsible in an executive or producer role for hundreds of documentary productions for cinema and television, including the Oscar-nominated Prisoner of Paradise (directed by Malcolm Clarke); Game Over: Kasparov and the Machine (Vikram Jayanti); the Emmy Award nominated City 40 (Samira Goetschel), and the International Critics Award-winning film The Wild Blue Yonder (Werner Herzog).

Since 1992, Singer has worked with Herzog as a producer or executive producer on sixteen productions, including Into the Abyss (2011). He and Lucki Stipetic were producers for Herzog's documentary, Into the Inferno (2016), about mankind's relationship with volcanoes; and in 2019/20 on Fireball : Visitors from Darker Worlds co-directed by Herzog and Clive Oppenheimer about the world of asteroids. He has (2018) co-directed with Werner Herzog a feature documentary about Mikhail Gorbachev called Meeting Gorbachev based around several encounters between Herzog and the last President of the USSR. This was followed by Meeting Zelenskyy based on meetings in 2023 between Volodymyr Zelenskyy and Liev Schreiber. Singer was also an Executive Producer on the multi-award winning documentaries and Oscar Nominees, The Act of Killing (2012) and "The Look of Silence" (2014), by Joshua Oppenheimer.

His film as director, "Where the Wind Blew" (2017) about the legacy of nuclear bomb testing during the Cold War in Kazakhstan and Nevada won the Raven Award for Best Feature documentary at the Utah International Documentary Film Festival. An earlier film, Night Will Fall (2014), a documentary about the Holocaust that incorporates material made by the British Government in 1945, is described by Stephen Fry as "incredibly dark, deep, disturbing, shocking and brilliant". The film was awarded two FOCAL Awards, a Peabody Award, and Best Documentary at the Moscow Jewish Film Festival in 2015; it won the Royal Television Society Award for Historical Documentary and the Emmy for Outstanding Historical Film (Long-form) in 2016. It was shown to over 70 million people worldwide.

Singer was given the Oscar Pomilio Award for Ethics in Pescara, Italy in 2015. He is the author of five books of non-fiction including, with his wife Lynette, Divine Magic : The World of the Supernatural. Singer was elected President of the Royal Anthropological Institute in 2014, was awarded their Patrons Medal in 2007. and was given their Lifetime Achievement Award for film in 2021. He was Adjunct Professor of the Practice of Anthropology at the University of Southern California and previously Visiting Professor of Film at the University of Westminster from 2014 - 2018. He was on the Film and Television Committee of BAFTA between 2010 and 2013.

Singer was appointed Officer of the Order of the British Empire (OBE) in the 2020 Birthday Honours for services to anthropology and the documentary film industry.

== Filmography as director ==
- Black Man's Burden (1975)
- A Song for the Time (1977)
- World in Action x 4 (1977-1979)
- Khyber (1979)
- The Pathans – Disappearing World (1979)
- Afghan Exodus (1980)
- Witchcraft Among the Azande – Disappearing World (1982)
- The Kazakhs of China – Disappearing World (1983)
- The Camp on Lantau Island – UNHCR/C4 (1984)
- The Lost Tribes – UNHCR/C4 (1984)
- A Man Without a Horse (1984)
- Strangers Abroad – 6 part series (1986)
- The Goddess and the Computer (1988)
- The Last Navigator (1989)
- The Hanging Gardens of Arabia (1990)
- Forbidden Rites – 3 part series (1999)
- Stairway to Heaven – co-director (2007)
- Night Will Fall (2015)
- Where the Wind Blew (2017)
- Meeting Gorbachev (2018)

== Filmography as producer ==
- Werner Herzog: Radical Dreamer - Director, Thomas von Steinaecker (2022)
- Last Exit : Space - Director, Rudolph Herzog (2022)
- Into The Inferno - Director, Werner Herzog (2016)
- The Emperor’s Secret Garden - Director, Mandy Chang/Zhou Bing (2010)
- The Arch Of Enlightenment - Director, Howard Reid (2011)
- La Boheme (Short) - Director, Werner Herzog (2009)
- The Wild Blue Yonder - Director, Werner Herzog (2006)
- Pipe Dreams - Director, David Goodale (2000)
- The Burning Hills - Director, John Sheppard (2004)
- Mysteries Of Peru - Director, Peter Spry-leverton (1996)
- Divine Magic x 10 Episodes (1996)
- The World Of Geo x 12 Episodes (1994-1996)
- The Road To Itang - Director, Andy Harris (1984)
- Living with the Revolution - Director, Leslie Woodhead (1983)
- The Newest Revolution - Director ,Leslie Woodhead (1983)
- Asante Market Women - Director, Claudia Milne (1982)
- The Kwegu - Director, Leslie Woodhead (1982)
- Carnaval - Director, Carlos Pasini (1982)
