= Hanuš Burger =

Czech-born filmmaker, author and screenwriter (1909–1990)

Hans Herbert Burger (June 4, 1909 Prague – November 13, 1990, Munich), also known as Hanuš Burger, Hans Burger, and Jan Burger, as well as under the pseudonyms Hans Herbert and Petr Hradec, was a theater, film, and television director, playwright and author of books and screenplays, including the documentary film Crisis (1939), and the German language version of Death Mills (1945), supervised by Billy Wilder. He was of Jewish descent.
