= Holocaust Memorial Museum of San Antonio =

Holocaust Memorial Museum
- Established: May 2000
- Location: Barshop Jewish Community Center; San Antonio, Texas
- Coordinates: 29.55721°N 98.53320°W
- Type: Jewish museum
- Visitors: 10,000 annually
- Website: https://www.hmmsa.org/

The Holocaust Memorial Museum of San Antonio, a program of the Jewish Federation of San Antonio, is located in San Antonio, Texas, and has provided educational services since 1975. In 2000 the museum opened its doors to the public.

The museum's mission is to make people aware of the dangers which prejudice, hatred and violence brought about during the Holocaust. It also endeavors to remind guests that these dangers are still relevant today. The museum promotes understanding, remembrance, and education with the goal that both students and the general population stay and become aware of the lesson of these tragic events. This lesson is that humankind must strive to live together in peace and harmony.

A major commitment of the Holocaust Museum San Antonio is the educational program. This program comprises a teacher program, a student program, and an academic program. The teacher program encourages and helps teachers to incorporate the topic "Holocaust" into their classes. The museum's "Curriculum Trunks Program," which is available for teachers throughout the city, gives teachers of all grades multimedia tools such as videos, posters, CDs, CD-ROMs, maps, classroom sets of books, lessons plans, and plans for student activities so that classes are as informative as possible. Teachers may also receive training on the Holocaust. Training may be related to the curriculum trunks or they may be general workshops.

The Holocaust Memorial Museum of San Antonio offers several opportunities for volunteers. Volunteers may work as docents or assist in the library and administrative offices.
