= Death Mills =

1945 film by Billy Wilder, Hanus Burger

- Death Mills
- Directed by: Billy Wilder; Hanuš Burger
- Written by: Hanuš Burger
- Edited by: Billy Wilder (supervisor)
- Distributed by: United States Department of War
- Release date: 1945 (Germany)
- Running time: 22 minutes
- Countries: United States; Germany
- Languages: English; German

Death Mills (or Die Todesmühlen) is a 1945 American-German film directed by Billy Wilder and produced by the United States Department of War. The film was intended for German audiences to educate them about the atrocities committed by the Nazi regime. For the German version, Die Todesmühlen, Hanuš Burger is credited as the writer and director, while Wilder supervised the editing. Wilder is credited with directing the English-language version; however, he later said that he didn't direct anything as "there was nothing to direct".

The film is a much-abbreviated version of German Concentration Camps Factual Survey, a 1945 British government documentary that was not completed until nearly seven decades later.

The German-language version of the film was shown in the US sector of West Germany in January 1946.

== Synopsis ==
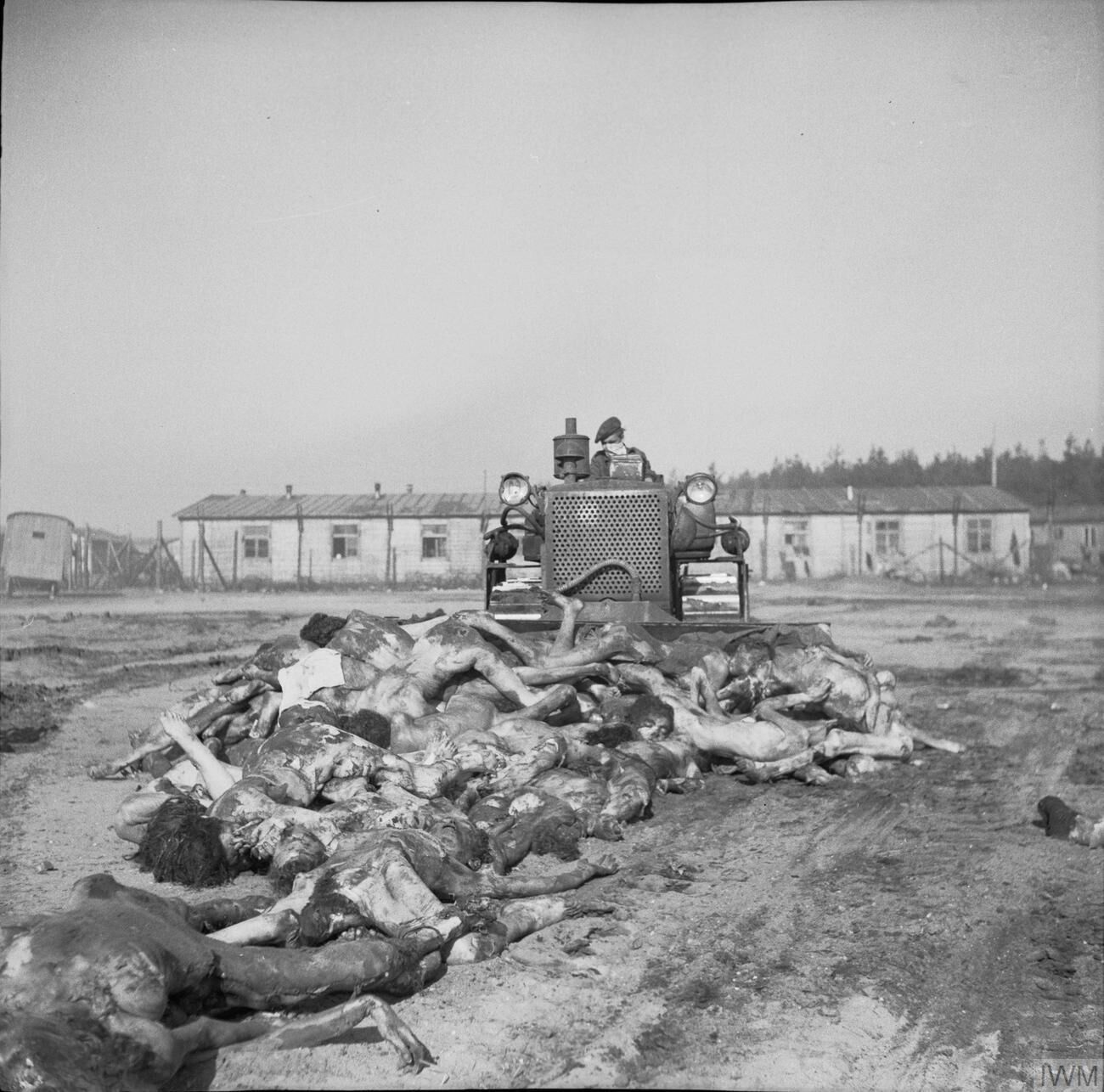
A British Army bulldozer pushes bodies into a mass grave at Belsen, April 19, 1945.

The film opens with a note that the following is "a reminder that behind the curtain of Nazi pageants and parades was millions of men, women and children who were tortured to death – the greatest mass murder in human history," then fades into German civilians at Gardelegen carrying crosses to the local concentration camp.

Most of the film includes footage of the newly liberated camps over a score of stark classical music. The narrator notes that people of all nationalities were found in the camps, including people of all religious or political creeds. There is no mention of the particular fate of Jewish people. The film states that 20 million people were killed and describes many of the now familiar aspects of the Holocaust, including the medical experiments and the gas chambers.

The Orson Welles film The Stranger uses footage of this film during the scene where Edward G. Robinson explains to Mary about Franz Kindler's responsibility for the Holocaust. This film would be included as a supplement on the Kino Lorber Blu-Ray of The Stranger.

== Concentration camps ==
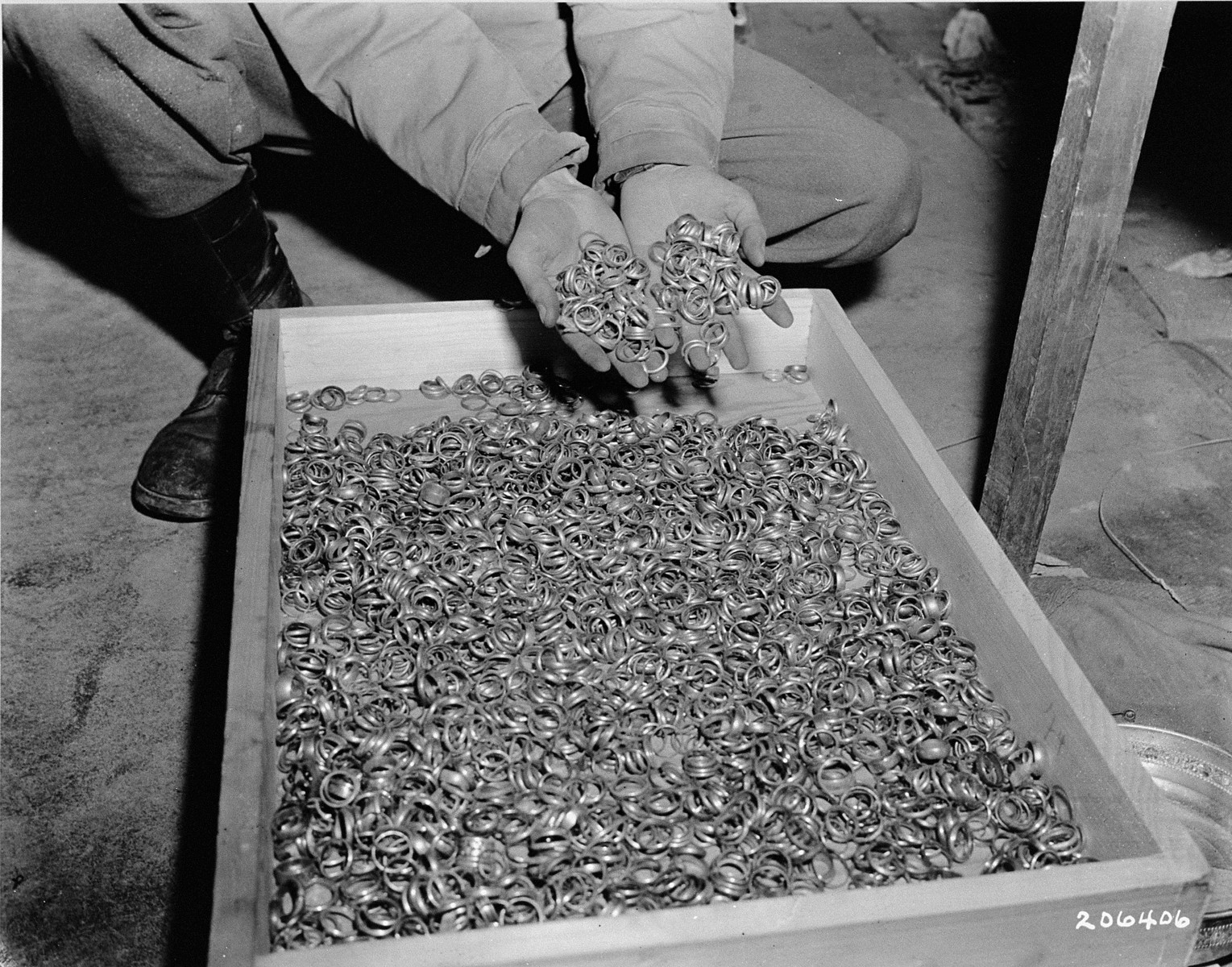
As Minister of Economics, Walther Funk accelerated the pace of rearmament and as Reichsbank president banked for the SS the gold rings of Buchenwald victims.

The images from the camps include shots of piles of skeletal corpses, naked skeletal survivors (often supported by fellow prisoners) together with footage of prosperous-looking German citizens being forced to observe their suffering. Some are also forced to carry the corpses to be buried, although most of this work was usually carried out by ex-camp guards (as at Belsen concentration camp).

There are shots of mass graves, as well as of individual burials, as at Hadamar, now known to be a euthanasia or Action T4 centre. Some of the footage appears to be of Soviet origin, and includes shots taken at Majdanek death camp which was one of the first camps to be liberated in 1944 by the Red Army. There are shots of the crematoria at several camps, as well as the infamous slogans erected at the entrances of most camps, such as Arbeit macht frei.

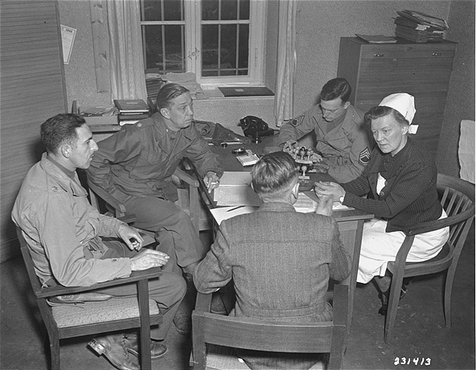
American war crimes investigators question Irmgard Huber at the Hadamar Killing Facility, May 1945.

Lastly, the film shows the piles of stolen personal belongings of gassed victims, filmed by the Soviets when they liberated Auschwitz, as well as by US troops at Buchenwald. They include piles of clothes, shoes, toys, wedding rings and gold teeth destined for the vaults of the Reichsbank.

== See also ==
- German Concentration Camps Factual Survey
- List of Holocaust films
- The Nuremberg Trials – Soviet film about the Nuremberg trials
- That Justice Be Done – American film about the Nuremberg trials
- Goldstein, Cora Sol, Capturing the German Eye: American Visual Propaganda in Occupied Germany, Chicago, IL: The University of Chicago, 2009, pp. 51–57. https://academic.oup.com/chicago-scholarship-online/book/14488
- Brewster S. Chamberlin, "Todesmühlen. Ein früher Versuch zur Massen-‚Umerziehung‘ im besetzten Deutschland, 1945–1946," in Vierteljahrshefte für Zeitgeschichte, vol. 29 (1981), pp. 420–436. https://www.ifz-muenchen.de/heftarchiv/1981_3_4_chamberlin.pdf
