= Trying Times (TV series) =

Canadian-American anthology comedy television series

Trying Times was a Canadian-American co-production anthology comedy television series produced by KCET, and aired on the PBS television network. The series lasted only two seasons, 1987 to 1989, but was the first original comedy on PBS. The series was co-produced with the Canadian Broadcasting Corporation, which aired the programs as part of a larger anthology series, Lies From Lotus Land.

Actors on the show included Rosanna Arquette, Candice Bergen, David Byrne, Jeff Daniels, Geena Davis, Teri Garr, Hope Lange, Catherine O'Hara, and Steven Wright. Scripts were written by Christopher Durang, Spalding Gray, Bernard Slade, and Wendy Wasserstein.

The comedies are without laugh tracks, with the central character as narrator. The series looked for writers first, hoping their choices would attract cast. Writers were involved in casting, and on the set.

The series was filmed in Vancouver, to reduce costs. It was created and produced by Jon S. Denny.

== Episodes ==
No. in series	Title	Directed by	Written by	Original release date
1.1	"A Family Tree"	Jonathan Demme	Beth Henley and Budge Threlkeld	1987
Kara Dimly (Rosanna Arquette) is disappointed when she meets the parents of her fiancé. Hope Lange, John Stockwell, Robert Ridgely, David Byrne, John Stedman also star.
1.3	"Get a Job"	Allan A. Goldstein	Earl Pomerantz	1987
The parents (Hagan Beggs, Betty Phillips) of a "professional student" (Steven Wright) stop funding his studies. Faced with finding a job, he falls in love with his interviewer Rebecca (Catherine O'Hara), who he dated in high school. Tim Matheson also stars.
1.4	"Moving Day"	TBD	Bernard Slade	1987
Candice Bergen plays a newly separated woman, moving to a new residence. Slade, a Broadway playwright, hadn't written for television work in 10 years. Bergen's first role in "at least a year and a half" after she had a baby.
