= Brian Steidle =

American Marine Corps officer (born 1976)

Brian Steidle (born 1976) is a former Marine Corps captain, military and security operations expert, and author who had worked on publicizing the Darfur conflict in Sudan. Steidle wrote a book, The Devil Came on Horseback, about his experience, which was turned into a documentary film that premiered at Sundance in 2007.

Steidle has shared his experience in Darfur with heads of state in the United States and abroad, addressed the U.S. Congress and the United Nations, and serves both as lecturer and advisor to several non-government organizations regarding their humanitarian efforts in Africa and other nations.

Prior to his work in Darfur, Steidle, the son of a high-ranking U.S. Navy officer, served in the United States Marine Corps from 1999 to 2003 as an infantry officer, completing his service with the rank of Captain.

== Work in Sudan ==
After his service he took a contract in the Nuba Mountains of Sudan working for the Joint Military Mission, a collaboration between 12 European nations, the US and Canada, monitoring the North-South Cease fire, now Comprehensive Peace Agreement. Starting as a team leader of a four-man team directly negotiating tense situations, he advanced to a sector commander and on to the Senior Operations Officer for the entire Joint Military Mission within 7 months.

== Darfur ==
In September 2004, at the age of 27, Steidle accepted an assignment as one of three U.S. military observers for the African Union (AU) in the Darfur region of western Sudan. His role was to monitor the cease fire between the two main rebel groups and the Sudanese Government. Additional roles included advising the AU on US personnel, operations, logistics and intelligence. Steidle witnessed the murders of thousands of people, but was not permitted to intervene, though he photographed what he witnessed. After his 13-month contract in Sudan was completed, he resigned the position and returned to the United States.

Steidle returned to Chad in 2006 to further document and publicize the events taking place there. He wrote of his experiences in Darfur in his book The Devil Came on Horseback, a reference to the Janjaweed faction that has been responsible for much of the genocide in Darfur. An award-winning and Emmy nominated documentary film of the same title was also produced about Steidle's story. The film is a Break Thru Films production in association with Global Grassroots and Three Generations. The film received significant charitable funding including grants from the Save Darfur Coalition and the Sundance Film Festival. Steidle appears throughout the film, narrating what he witnessed and interviewing survivors in Darfur.

Quote: “Darfur is more than an occasional headline in the newspaper or 20 seconds on a forgotten nightly newscast. It is where genocide continues to happen while the rest of the world goes through the motion of concern but does nothing of substance to stop it. Will the world ever wake up?”

== United States ==
Since his return from Sudan, Steidle has spoken at more than 500 venues including Harvard Law School, Princeton, UCLA, West Point and the US Naval Academy. His book has been incorporated into the curriculum of several of these schools. He has testified in the US Congress, UK Parliament, and at the UN Human Rights Council, providing expertise on Sudan and raising awareness of human rights violations and atrocities. He acted as Security and Logistics officer for several NGOs during trips to Chad, Kenya, and Rwanda, coordinating all aspects of route planning, contingency planning, evacuation plans, security threat, criminal or enemy situations, and situational updates. Steidle is a proven African expert, providing guidance and strategic advice including intelligence gathering, NGO Operations, AU effectiveness, war crimes, human rights violations and Sudanese military operations to NGOs, The International Criminal Court, Department of State, DOD, SOCOM, EUCOM, AFRICOM, and DHS ICE. He has also conducted Peace Support Operations Training for the Malawian Defense Force in 2009 prior to its deployment to eastern Chad.

== Haiti ==
From Jan–May 2010, Steidle acted as a consultant and volunteer in Port-au-Prince, Haiti, following the devastating earthquake. He assisted US security forces in implementation of force protection plans for US government and NGO agencies, and developed, planned, coordinated, and implemented evasion plans and a personnel recovery capability for several NGOs. He conducted search and rescue and recovery efforts at the Hotel Montana, Pétion-Ville, Haiti. In addition to this he coordinated transportation, security, support and guidance to NGOs and volunteers. Using his military experience and desire to help those less fortunate he advised the Haitian Ministry of Justice, Police Chief and SWAT Commanders during human trafficking investigations. In addition, he helped with the installation of solar lighting and charging stations in Port-au-Prince, Haiti; constructed slow-sand water filters and provided them to communities; field tested the Seldon Technology Water Box and providing insight on possible improvements; provided clean drinking water to hundreds of families through the use of the Water Box; and conducted an initial analysis of plastic recycling facility in PaP for potential investors.

Brian continues to advise NGOs and Government organization on humanitarian affairs, peace support operation, policy, security, investigations, intelligence gathering and domestic and foreign operations.
