= Sidney Bernstein, Baron Bernstein =

British businessman and media executive (1899–1993)

The Right Honourable The Lord Bernstein
- Born: Sidney Lewis Bernstein; 30 January 1899; Ilford, Essex, England (present-day London)
- Died: 5 February 1993 (aged 94); London, England
- Occupation: Television executive
- Known for: Co-founder of Transatlantic Pictures; Founder of Granada Television; Chairman of the Granada Group
- Spouses: Zoe Farmer (m. 1936; div. 1946) Sandra Malone (m. 1954)
- Children: 3, including Jane

Sidney Lewis Bernstein, Baron Bernstein (30 January 1899 – 5 February 1993) was a British businessman and media executive who was the founding chairman of the London-based Granada Group and the founder of the Manchester-based Granada Television in 1954. Granada was one of the original four ITA franchises. He believed the North's media industry had potential to be cultivated.

Although born in Essex, Bernstein became an adopted northerner, building Granada Television, which created a proud heritage of television broadcasting in Manchester; a legacy which continues. He is described by the British Film Institute (BFI) as the "dominant influence on the growth and development of commercial television in Britain".

Bernstein was awarded a life peerage by Queen Elizabeth II in the 1969 Birthday Honours List for his services to television, and in 1984 he was made a Fellow of the British Film Institute in recognition of his outstanding contribution to British television culture.

== Biography ==
Bernstein was born to a Jewish family in Ilford. His father was a Swedish émigré. Bernstein left school at 15 and he gradually inherited the property portfolio his father had built.

=== Granada Theatres ===
Bernstein, with his brother Cecil, created a successful circuit of sixty cinemas and theatres. Some of the cinemas were on property he inherited from his father. The Bernstein holdings eventually encompassed interests in publishing, real estate, motorway services, retail shops and bowling alleys, as well as the hugely profitable television-rental business.

Bernstein was a co-founder of the London Film Society in 1925, where he met and befriended the young Alfred Hitchcock, who became a lifelong friend and, briefly, a producing partner. Bernstein was the first to bring October: Ten Days That Shook the World and other works from the Russian filmmaker Eisenstein, as well as the films of Pudovkin, to London, and sponsored Eisenstein's trip to Hollywood in the early 1930s. He also ventured into theatre, building an elegant new venue which housed the premiere of Private Lives by Noël Coward, the hit which cemented that playwright's reputation. Though his involvement with the live stage was short-lived, he was passionate about the construction of palaces throughout Britain. As early as 1931, he was advising the planning committee for the long unrealised project for a National Theatre to include film projection and television production facilities into its plans for a theatre.

Bernstein was an early and ardent anti-fascist, beginning in 1933, when he helped many German actors, such as Peter Lorre, directors, cameramen and other German Jewish and anti-Nazi filmmakers to escape Germany and find work in Britain after they were expelled from the state-run UFA studios when Adolf Hitler came to power and sacked all Jewish state employees. Bernstein travelled to America frequently during the 1930s, where he met with Hollywood studio executives and organised meetings to persuade them to support the anti-fascist cause, and, after war broke out between Britain and Germany, to join the British in their fight against the Nazis. By this point, Bernstein had joined the newly formed Ministry of Information, and continued his role of producing and bringing anti-Nazi and pro-British films before the American people during the critical years 1939–1941, when the United States remained neutral while Britain struggled alone against the Blitz and potential Nazi invasion. By 1943, Bernstein was also a member of the Supreme Headquarters Allied Expeditionary Force, known as SHAEF, and worked on films which would help the new Allies, Britain and America, to understand each other. He read and advised on early drafts of Mrs. Miniver (1942), the film starring Greer Garson as the heroic mother of a wartorn British family, which MGM made after a meeting of MGM executives with Bernstein in Hollywood. According to his daughter, Bernstein was a socialist, and "very left wing".

As the invasion of France loomed, Bernstein brought his friend Hitchcock back from Hollywood to Britain to work on two short documentary films for the post-invasion French audience. As the war wound to its close, Bernstein heard the first reports of extermination camps, visited Belsen himself, and was determined to create a film that would be seen by both the German and English-speaking audiences so that they would know the extent of the atrocities of the camps. To this end, he again consulted with Hitchcock to supervise the work of US and British Army cameramen documenting the horrors of the newly liberated camps, under the working title German Concentration Camps Factual Survey. The original plan to complete a feature-length documentary film of the camps was abruptly cancelled in July 1945, as the British Foreign Office claimed the material was too incendiary in light of the need for post-war co-operation from the defeated Germans. Hitchcock had already begun screening and editing the 800,000 feet of film from Allied cameramen and confiscated German documentation in the summer of 1945 when the project was shelved under number F-3080 in the Imperial War Museum archives, not to be seen until it was unearthed by film scholars in 1984 and shown on the BBC as Memory of the Camps. In documenting the camps, Hitchcock suggested the cameramen use the longest takes possible, to show that what the camera was filming was real; this initiated Hitchcock's own involvement in long, uncut takes, which became the raison d'être of Bernstein and Hitchcock's first co-production, the experimental Rope, starring James Stewart.

== Film producer and lobbyist ==
In 1945–46, Bernstein formed Transatlantic Pictures in partnership with Alfred Hitchcock in preparation for the end of Hitchcock's contract with David O. Selznick in 1947. Bernstein was an uncredited producer on two of Hitchcock's films, Rope (1948), filmed in Hollywood, and Under Capricorn (1949) filmed at MGM-British in Borehamwood, near London.

Hitchcock's Stage Fright (1950) started out as a Transatlantic production, but became a Warner Brothers production after the failure of Under Capricorn. In 1954, Bernstein and Hitchcock dissolved their partnership, after one final attempt to produce The Bramble Bush, based on the 1948 novel by David Duncan. (See entry for unproduced Hitchcock Projects.)

Beginning in 1948, Bernstein lobbied the government to give the cinema industry the right to produce and transmit television programmes, not to individual homes, as the BBC did, but to audiences gathered in cinemas and theatres.

=== Granada Television ===
In 1954, Bernstein won a franchise licence to broadcast commercial television to the north of England including key urban areas such as Manchester, Liverpool, Leeds and Sheffield. Bernstein wanted the north of England as this would not have any detrimental effect on viewers at his theatres, which were predominantly based in the south of England. Furthermore, he strongly believed the north of England had a cultural heart that had potential to be cultivated, which would translate itself into good television.

The North and London were the two biggest regions. Granada preferred the North because of its tradition of home-grown culture, and because it offered a chance to start a new creative industry away from the metropolitan atmosphere of London... the North is a closely knit, indigenous, industrial society; a homogeneous cultural group with a good record for music, theatre, literature and newspapers, not found elsewhere in this island, except perhaps in Scotland. Compare this with London and its suburbs – full of displaced persons. And, of course, if you look at a map of the concentration of population in the North and a rainfall map, you will see that the North is an ideal place for television.

To achieve his aim, Bernstein ordered the building of the United Kingdom's first completed purpose-built television studios (BBC Television Centre began construction several years earlier, but was only opened in 1960, four years after Granada's). Construction of Granada Studios began in 1954. At Bernstein's behest, the studios featured a purely decorative white, lattice tower in the form of a transmitter tower to give the studios an embellished and professional appearance. Paintings from Bernstein's art collection and portraits of Edward R. Murrow and showman P. T. Barnum adorned the interior of the studios to inspire creativity among Granada employees.

Bernstein's instincts proved to be sound. Despite objections to a commercial franchise being awarded to a company with overtly left-wing leanings, Granada began broadcasting from Manchester in May 1956, proudly proclaiming its origins with the slogan 'From the North' and labelling its new constituency 'Granadaland'. The first night's programming opened, at Bernstein's insistence, with an homage to the BBC, whose public broadcasting pedigree he had always admired, and closed with a public-spirited statement of advertising policy which suggested an ambivalence about the commercial imperative to maximise profits.

As early as January 1957, Granada was responsible for the top ten programmes, by ratings, available in its region. Bernstein's company soon came to be regarded as one of the most progressive of the independent television contractors. One famous series Bernstein was not enthusiastic about was the drama serial Coronation Street. Bernstein's brother Cecil felt the same way about it; upon hearing the proposal for what was then to be known as Florizel Street, Sidney stated that scriptwriter Tony Warren had "pick[ed] up all the boring bits and strung them together one after another".

Nevertheless, Coronation Street was approved and soon become a popular programme. Granada also garnered a reputation for producing high-profile current affairs and documentary programmes, such as World in Action, Disappearing World and What the Papers Say, all of which lent Granada prestige and aligned it, unmistakably, with the ideals of its founder.

== Later life ==
On 3 July 1969 he was created a life peer as Baron Bernstein, of Leigh in the County of Kent. In the 1970s, Lord Bernstein finally relinquished stewardship of the television company and moved over to the business side of the Granada plc. He retired in 1979 and became chairman of the Royal Exchange Theatre, Manchester. He was named a Fellow of the British Film Institute and received the International Emmy Directorate Award in 1984. He died in 1993, aged 94.

== Personal life and death ==
Sidney Bernstein's first marriage, in November 1936, ended ten years later in an amicable divorce, with his first wife, Zoe Farmer, eventually marrying Robin Barry, the son of his close friend, Iris Barry, the lifelong film curator of the Museum of Modern Art and one of the founders, along with Sidney, of the London Film Society.

Bernstein remarried in 1954, to Canadian-born Sandra Alexandra Malone, with whom he had two children, a son, David, and a daughter Jane I. Wells, as well as adopting his wife's daughter from a previous marriage, Charlotte-Lynn. This marriage lasted for the rest of his life.

Bernstein's daughter is a documentarian, following in her father's footsteps by producing more than 40 short documentaries and currently lives in New York. She helped to bring about her father's last wish that the documentary on which he had done so much work, with Alfred Hitchcock and many others. The story of this documentary can be found in the HBO film Night Will Fall.

Bernstein was a keen art collector and paintings from his collection adorned the walls of the Granada Studios. On his death in 1993, he bequeathed part of his collection – which included works by Chagall and Modigliani – to the Manchester Art Gallery. Bernstein was known to be a bad driver, something that his colleagues such as Mike Scott used to joke about when Bernstein gave up driving.

In the late 1970s, Bernstein sued aerial photography company Skyviews & General Ltd. for trespass after taking aerial photographs of his Coppings Farm residence without his authorisation. The resulting court case, Bernstein of Leigh (Baron) v Skyviews & General Ltd. [1978], becoming a landmark decision on air rights within British law.

Bernstein died on 5 February 1993 in his home in London. He was 94.

== Portrayals ==
Bernstein was portrayed by Steven Berkoff in the 2010 BBC one-off drama The Road to Coronation Street, about the creation of the soap opera.

In 2025 he was portrayed by Henry Goodman in The Film, a BBC Radio 4 audio drama by Martin Jameson about the making of the German Concentration Camps Factual Survey. Jane Wells is acknowledged for having "generously helped with the research for this drama".

== Filmography ==
- Rope (uncredited producer, 1948)
- Under Capricorn (uncredited producer, 1949)
- German Concentration Camps Factual Survey, the restoration of which discussed in documentary film Night Will Fall (2015)
- Memory of the Camps (1985) executive producer, including footage of concentration camps filmed by Hitchcock as part of Factual Survey in 1945
- Frontline (1985) executive producer (US release) episode, "Memory of the Camps"

== Arms ==
Coat of arms of Sidney Bernstein, Baron Bernstein
Coronet A Coronet of a Baron Crest A bear's head erased Sable collared company Argent and Sable rimmed Or. Escutcheon Quarterly Sable and Argent a spade between a decresent and a sun all counterchanged. Supporters Dexter a bear sinister a fighting bull Sable each gorged of a torse Argent and Sable. Motto If I Rest I Rust Badge A roundel quarterly Sable and Argent fimbriated Vert and charged with a spade counterchanged.
