= Jane Wells =

American journalist

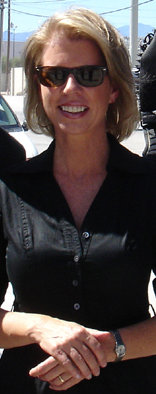
- Wells in 2007.
- Born: March 31, 1961 (age 65); Los Angeles County, California, U.S.
- Education: University of Southern California
- Occupation: Journalist
- Title: CNBC

Jane Wells (born March 31, 1961) is a former CNBC special correspondent, based in Los Angeles, where she covers stories about funny business, strange successes and other special assignments.

Wells serves as a contributor for radio stations and writes Wells $treet, a blog for Substack. One recent story for CNBC was about a 34-year-old Portland woman who got paid for cuddling people and a college student who invented a special beer shelf that made him a millionaire. She has worked for CNBC for more than 20 years, including earlier stints covering retail, agriculture and defense as well as news about the California economy, West Coast real estate and Las Vegas trends. Wells came from CNBC's "Upfront Tonight" where she was senior correspondent.

== Career ==
Wells was a correspondent for the Fox News Channel and Los Angeles reporter for NBC's flagship television station, WNBC, New York City. She then joined CNBC in 1996, where she provided special coverage of the O. J. Simpson civil case for "Rivera Live" starring Geraldo Rivera. Her career includes reporter positions with KTTV, Los Angeles; WTVJ, Miami; and, KOB, Albuquerque. She has also taken part in several international reports for CNN.

Wells started as a news writer for KTLA in Los Angeles. Wells is perhaps best known for having a bit part in the cultural event of the late 1990s, the "Seinfeld" finale. She plays an on-scene reporter holding a conversation with Rivera regarding the "Seinfeld Four," making a reference to another of the rumors regarding the ending of Seinfeld. Wells says, "There's no love lost with that group. There seems to be some friction between Jerry Seinfeld and Elaine Benes. The rumor is that they once dated and that it ended badly." Rivera responds, "Maybe this trial will end up bringing them closer together. Maybe they'll end up getting married." Wells continues to receive residual checks for that role on Seinfeld to this day.
