= Granada plc =

Former British mass media company

- Final logo, used from 2000 to 2004
- Type: Public
- Traded as: LSE: GAA
- Industry: Conglomerate (primarily media)
- Founded: 1930; 96 years ago
- Founder: Sidney Bernstein
- Defunct: 2 February 2004; 22 years ago
- Fate: Acquired Carlton and renamed itself ITV plc
- Successor: ITV plc (TV services); Moto Hospitality (Granada Compass motorways)
- Headquarters: London and Manchester, UK
- Key people: Charles Allen (Executive Chairman); Henry Staunton (Financial Director)
- Products: Granada Breeze; Granada Plus; Granada Men and Motors; Granada Talk TV
- Number of employees: 31,000 (2001) prior to demerger of Compass Group; 4,700 (2002)
- Divisions: Granada America; Granada Australia; Granada International; Granada Productions; Granada Ventures
- Subsidiaries: Granada TV Rental; Granada Theatres; Granada Motorway Services; Telerent; Granada Television; London Weekend Television; Yorkshire Television; Tyne Tees Television; Meridian Broadcasting; Anglia Television; HTV (sold to Carlton for competition reasons); Border Television

Granada plc was a British television conglomerate, that also operated in the areas of hospitality, entertainment, publishing and retail.

Founded in 1930 by Sidney Bernstein, it was best known for founding the Manchester-based Granada Television in 1954. In 1964, it ventured into hospitality by opening its first motorway service area. It was later a constituent of the FTSE 100 Index.

In February 2001, it divested its hospitality business group to Compass Group after it had briefly merged with them. In October 2002, after becoming the leading ITV franchise holders, Granada and Carlton Communications announced a merger worth £2.6bn, with both entities becoming ITV plc in February 2004.

== History ==
In 1930, businessman Sidney Bernstein founded Granada Theatres Ltd in Dover, a cinema company. Granada was listed on the London Stock Exchange in 1935.

It was awarded the North of England ITV franchise in 1954, broadcasting as Granada Television.

During the 1980s, Granada became involved in the British Satellite Broadcasting satellite television company. This went on air in March 1990, but merged with Sky Television in November 1990 to form British Sky Broadcasting (BSkyB), in which Granada had a minority shareholding for some time.

In 1994, Granada acquired London Weekend Television. Two years later, Granada, LWT and a British consortium of cable channels formed Granada Media Group plc, which a year later acquired Yorkshire-Tyne Tees Television plc. In 1997, Granada expanded onto the North American market by launching Granada Entertainment USA.

In March 1998, Granada announced their plans to launch a home video unit, eventually signing a five-year deal with Video Collection International to launch Granada Video in September.

Granada also bid together with Carlton Communications and BSkyB for one of the UK digital terrestrial television licences. They won the licence, though BSkyB was excluded from the company, ONdigital, on competition grounds. It went on air in 1998, was rebranded to ITV Digital in 2001, then entered voluntary liquidation before closing in 2002.

In 2000, Granada purchased United News & Media's television interests, namely Meridian Broadcasting and Anglia Television; Granada was forced to sell the HTV broadcasting business (to Carlton) for competition reasons, though it held onto HTV's network production business. It also acquired Border Television in 2001, from Capital Radio plc.

In 2002 speculation began to centre on when, not if, Carlton and Granada would merge. In October 2003 a merger was agreed between the two companies, with Granada shareholders owning two-thirds of the new company. That the new company was in effect a takeover by Granada of Carlton was admitted in the first annual report of the new company, ITV plc, which treated the company as effectively a continuation of Granada plc (with the Carlton merger regarded as an acquisition) for accounting purposes.

At the time of the merger with Carlton Communications, Granada was mainly involved in the television business. It owned seven ITV companies – Granada Television, London Weekend Television, Yorkshire Television, Tyne Tees Television, Meridian Broadcasting, Anglia Television and Border Television. It also owned the Granada Sky Broadcasting pay-TV business, which at the time offered two channels, Men and Motors and Granada Plus. ITV plc has since taken full control of GSB and closed down archive channel Plus in favour of ITV3. Granada also owned 50% shares in ITV2 and the ITV News Channel, and a 20% share of Independent Television News. It also owned 45% of TV3, Ireland.

The Granada name continues on as the official name of the North West ITV region and its on air regional news programme Granada Reports and was used to brand productions of ITV plc companies on channels other than ITV branded channels in the United Kingdom until it was replaced by the ITV Studios brand in 2009.

Charles Allen was chief executive of Granada until 2 February 2004, when he became chief executive of the newly created ITV plc, a post he retained until 1 October 2006.

== Operations outside television ==
=== Retail ===
The company also established a chain of television rental shops from 1959 onwards, expanding in 1968 by purchasing Robinson Rentals for £8 million from David Robinson, giving the group 660,000 subscribers and becoming the third largest television rental group in Great Britain behind Radio Rentals and Thorn.

Until 2000, there was a widespread high street chain called Granada TV Rental in the UK, Canada and in the US. The UK headquarters were originally in Manchester. The company started life as Red Arrow TV Rental, using a red version of Granada's north-pointing arrow as its logo. This was a home entertainment equipment rental chain, similar to Radio Rentals and Rediffusion. The mainstay of the business from the late 1950s, and through the 1960s and 70s, was television set rental; during this period televisions were expensive to purchase and were often unreliable.

In 1978, the company expanded its operations into the domestic videocassette recorder (VCR) rental market. This new household item was also a high-cost purchase: for example, a JVC HR-3300 VHS recorder cost £680 in 1978, equivalent to £3,700 in 2025. In the 1980s, the rental of satellite TV reception equipment became another opportunity for the company to supplement its declining income.

As electronic product prices fell and their reliability improved, consumer behaviour changed from renting to buying electrical goods. This drift away from rental eventually resulted in the decline of this chain and others. Granada purchased Telefusion (a Blackpool-based rental company) and DVR. It went on to merge with Robinson Rentals, moving the Granada base from Sharston Road, Manchester, to the Robinson building on Ampthill Road, Bedford. The two main players at this time were Granada TV Rental (GTVR) and Radio Rentals. Both were experiencing a decline in business and in 2000 they merged to form Boxclever.

Red Arrow was one of a number of experimental companies launched by Sidney and Alex Bernstein's Granada Group and was, apart from Granada Cinemas and Granada Television, by far the most successful. Others included Green Arrow – artificial plant and flower leasing to companies – and Black Arrow – office furniture and equipment leasing. This company was disposed of and has no connection with any other venture of a similar name.

In 1983, Granada Microcomputer Services were set up to supply computer hardware to businesses. These services were originally marketed as shops but later became "business centres". This business was sold in 1987.

=== Publishing ===
Granada entered the publishing business in the 1960s: it bought Mayflower Books from their founding U.S. publisher, Dell Publishing, and Panther Books (including Paladin Books, founded 1966 by Sonny Mehta) by 1968, which imprints continued to be run separately editorially, and added Rupert Hart-Davis and MacGibbon and Kee which it combined to form Hart-Davis, MacGibbon in 1972. Eventually the various publishing companies were combined as Granada Publishing. William Collins, Sons acquired Granada Publishing in 1983, renaming it Grafton Books after the editorial offices' address.

=== Hospitality ===
Granada opened its first motorway service area in 1964, and established a chain of service areas across the British motorway network. The company was the first British service station operator to move away from fancy dining and instead offer a basic but quicker service. Soon, all the other operators took on this idea. Granada's hospitality arm was at its strongest in the 1990s under Gerry Robinson's chairmanship of the group. At one time the company owned and operated 75% of the motorway service areas. It expanded into other areas of catering, including most notably the acquisition in 1996 of Forte Group. This included rival operator Welcome Break (later sold due to monopoly concerns), roadside chains Little Chef and Happy Eater, and Forte's hotels (including Travelodge and Le Méridien).

In July 2000, Granada merged with Compass Group plc to form Granada Compass plc, as part of a strategy to separate Granada's media and catering interests. The demerger took place in early 2001, with the media business becoming Granada Ltd. The motorway service stations were soon rebranded as Moto.

=== Entertainment ===
From the late 1980s to the late 1990s, Granada operated three theme parks. The first, Camelot, was purchased by Granada in 1986 along with Park Hall Leisure; near Charnock Richard in Lancashire, it had a medieval theme and featured a jousting arena. It was sold by Granada in 1998 and closed in 2012. The American Adventure was opened by Granada in 1987 in Ilkeston, Derbyshire. The site had been sold by Derbyshire County Council after a failed theme park called Britannia Park closed 10 weeks after opening. The park was successful for several years and was known for having the tallest log flume in the United Kingdom. Granada sold the park in 1997 after its business started to decline; it eventually closed at the end of 2006. The Granada Studios Tour was opened in 1988 as a Granada Television themed park that featured sets, props and techniques used by the company. In 1997 the park gained Skytrak Total, the world's first flying roller coaster. The park closed to the public in 1999 and fully in 2001, during the company's difficulties with ITV Digital.

In 1991, Granada Theatres Ltd was sold to Bass. In the 1960s, when bingo was at its most popular, Granada had turned some of their cinema chains into bingo halls. This business was included in the Bass 1991 sale, and was rebranded as Gala Bingo.

From 1988, Granada opened and operated a chain of bowling alleys under the name GX Superbowl. In 1995, the chain was sold to Allied Leisure. Granada purchased the Madison chain of nightclubs from Taz Leisure Group in 1989.

== See also ==
- ITV Granada, formerly Granada Television
- ITV Studios, formerly Granada Productions
- Red Heart, joint venture with Seven Network
