= Thorn Electrical Industries =

Former British electrical engineering company

- Type: Public
- Industry: Electrical engineering
- Founded: 29 March 1928 (as The Electrical Lamp Service Company Ltd)
- Defunct: 1998
- Fate: Merged with EMI Group
- Successor: Thorn EMI
- Headquarters: London, UK
- Key people: Founders – Sir Jules Thorn and Alfred Deutsch
- Products: light bulbs; radios; televisions; lamps, luminaires and lighting components (through Thorn Lighting)
- Parent: Terra Firma Capital Partners

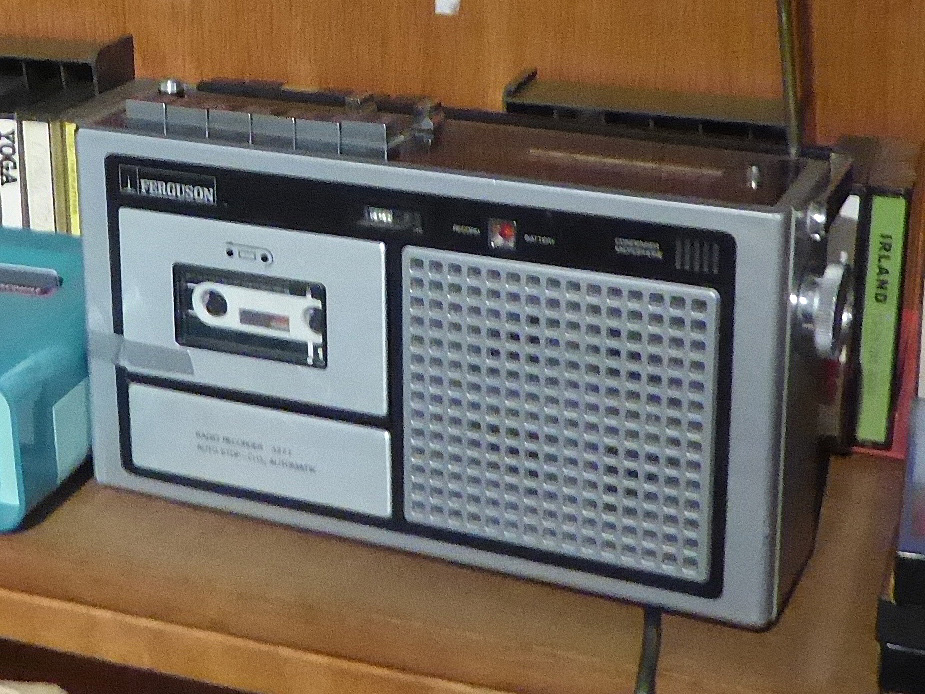
Ferguson portable radio cassette recorder also featuring the Thorn logo. Thorn owned Ferguson between the late 1950s and the late 1980s.

Thorn Electrical Industries Limited was a British electrical engineering company. It was listed on the London Stock Exchange, and also a past constituent of the FTSE 100 Index.

Thorn was named after the Austrian-born businessman Sir Jules Thorn, who migrated to the UK in 1923 and established the Electric Lamp Service Company, trading in electrical appliances, in 1926. Two years later, the business was incorporated and continued to steadily grow. Following the acquisition of the Atlas Lamp Works company in 1932, the firm started producing light bulbs at a factory in Edmonton. In 1936, Thorn started the domestic distribution of radios on behalf of the Ferguson Radio Corporation, which it ultimately acquired ten years later. It established DER in 1939 to manufacture televisions. Within three years of the Second World War's conclusion, the company had 2,400 employees working across multiple factories, producing lamps, lighting fittings, radios, and televisions amongst other domestic appliances.

Further expansion of Thorn took place during the 1950s, striking deals with both the US-based Bendix Aviation Corporation and the transnational conglomerate EMI Group to produce products on their behalf, as well as the acquisition of Philco's British interests. During 1961, Ultra Electronics's consumer electronics interests were integrated with Thorn. Three years later, Thorn merged its lighting interests with those of Associated Electrical Industries (AEI) to form British Lighting Industries. In 1968, Thorn acquired Radio Rentals in exchange for £180 million, and completed a hostile takeover of the domestic appliance specialist Kenwood Manufacturing. That year, the company operated in excess of fifty factories across the UK as well as eight furth plants overseas. The American company General Telephone and Electronics (GTE) also held a large interest in the company around this time.

During 1969, Thorn merged with EMI Group to form Thorn EMI, after which it operated under this brand for almost 30 years. Thorn was de-merged in 1996 and regained its individual listing for a brief period before the company was acquired by the Japanese investment company Nomura Group only two years later. After being transferred to the buyout specialists Terra Firma Capital Partners, parts of the company were sold off in 2007.

== History ==
=== Background ===
The company can trace its origins back to Jules Thorn and the 1920s. Thorn had migrated to the UK from Austria in 1923 and initially worked as a travelling salesman for Olso, an Austrian manufacturer of gas mantles. When Olso became bankrupt in 1926, Thorn decided to stay in England and set up the Electric Lamp Service Company as dealers in electrical and radio goods, including importing Hungarian lamps. On 29 March 1928, The Electric Lamp Service Company Ltd was incorporated, taking over the undertakings, property and assets of the Electric Lamp Service Company.

In 1928, the Austrian engineer Alfred Deutsch visited Thorn and was persuaded to stay to help organize the company's production process. In 1931, Thorn opened his first shop, renting radios in Twickenham.

In August 1932, Thorn personally acquired a controlling interest in Chorlton Metal Co. Limited, dealers of electric lamps and radio goods, based in Manchester. Prior to 1933, the company had focused on the purchase and sale of electric lamps and radio goods. As a result of Thorn's acquisition of the Atlas Lamp Works company in 1932, the firm began to manufacture its own light bulbs in Edmonton, north London by the end of 1933. The company grew rapidly to become one of the world's largest producers of lamps, luminaires and lighting components.

In October 1933, Jules Thorn formed Lotus Radio (1933) Limited with Mr L. M. Glancy, a director of Chorlton Metal Co. Limited, acquiring certain assets of the original Lotus Company and to manufacture radio receivers.

=== Rebranding and going public ===
The company changed its name to Thorn Electrical Industries Limited on 26 November 1936 and became a public limited company on 28 November 1936. Earlier in the year, Chorlton Metal Co. Limited and Lotus Radio (1933) Limited had become wholly owned subsidiaries. and the group had acquired the freehold property known as Atlas Works, which they previously leased.

Jules Thorn became chairman of Ferguson Radio Corporation in 1936 and Thorn began distributing their entire domestic radio production. On 9 July 1946, Thorn acquired Ferguson in exchange for £150,000. In 1947, Thorn formed an agreement with Sylvania Electric Products to co-operate on the development and manufacture of fluorescent lamps.

During 1939, Thorn established a subsidiary, DER, to pursue the manufacture of televisions. Prior to 1947, it only operated a single outlet, but had expanded to ten branches by 1954 and would reach 397 branches in 1967.

By 1948, the company had 2,400 employees and operated factories in Enfield (Ferguson's), Edmonton, Hirwaun and Tottenham; it was also in the process of building another in Merthyr Tydfil. The group was manufacturing Atlas lamps, fluorescent lighting fittings and equipment; Ferguson radio and television receivers; and Mary Ann domestic appliances. At that date, its trading subsidiaries were Ferguson Radio Corporation; Lamp Presscaps (manufacturer of lamp caps); Domestic Electrical Rentals (letting of radio and domestic appliances); and British Electric Domestic Appliances (sale and servicing of radio and domestic appliances) as well as a subsidiary in South Africa. The company bought Tricity Cookers in 1951.

=== Further expansion ===
In 1957, Thorn entered an agreement with Bendix Aviation Corporation in the United States to produce electrical components for guided missiles and supersonic aircraft in Britain on behalf of Bendix. The same year, they made arrangements with the transnational conglomerate EMI to produce "His Master's Voice" (HMV) and Marconiphone radio and television receivers. Additionally, Thorn reorganised all of its lighting activities under Atlas Lighting Limited. In April 1959, they acquired Philco's UK business.

In 1959, the company secured a stake in the relay operator Multi-Signals Ltd; it became a wholly-owned subsidiary of Thorn in 1964.

During 1961, Ultra Electronics's consumer electronics interests were integrated with Thorn, which continued to manufacture products under the Ultra brand up to 1974. These activates were subsequently organised under a subsidiary, the British Radio Corporation Limited.

In 1964, driven by the need to compete more effectively in world markets, Thorn merged its lighting interests with those of Associated Electrical Industries (AEI) to form British Lighting Industries. One year later, Thorn took over Glover and Main, an Edmonton-based gas appliance manufacturer. Thorn manufactured television sets in Australia and in Bradford, UK.

In June 1967, Moffat's interests in the UK were acquired. In August 1967, Thorn acquired Metal Industries, which had interests in electrical and electronic control and instrumentation, including Avo, Towler and Fawcett. Certain of Thorn's electrical interests were merged with the UK electronic interests of the Bendix Corporation through a joint company, Thorn Bendix. In November 1967, Thorn bought out AEI's 35 percent interest in British Lighting Industries. In March 1968, they acquired Keyswitch Relays.

By 1968, the Thorn Group had over fifty major factories in the United Kingdom and eight overseas covering a wide field in the electrical and electronics industries. At the time, their British Radio Corporation Limited held a leading position in the UK manufacture of television receivers, radio receivers, radio gramophones and tape recorders sold under the brands Ferguson, Ultra, HMV and Marconiphone. Furthermore, Thorn's British Lighting Industries held the largest share of the UK lighting market in 1968 and was also the largest exporter of lighting equipment from the UK; it sold its products under the brands Mazda, Atlas and Ekco.

Its domestic appliances division had a large share of the electric and gas cooker market sold under the brand names Tricity, Main and Moffat. It was also a substantial manufacturer of refrigerators, gas fires and small electric appliances. Thorn was also a major manufacturer of industrial catering equipment through its subsidiaries, Benham & Sons and James Scott & Co. Through a joint venture with AEI (Thorn-AEI Radio Valves and Tubes), they were one of two major manufacturers of valves and tubes in the UK, including colour television tubes. The brand names of the products were Mazda and Brimar.

=== Radio Rentals acquisition ===
In 1968, Thorn acquired the British firm Radio Rentals in exchange for £180 million, and incorporated it into the Domestic Electrical Rentals (DER) business, which became the largest television rental group in Great Britain with 2.6 million subscribers and 1,300 stores. The same year, it also acquired Kenwood Manufacturing, a British-based domestic appliance producer, via a hostile takeover.

American company General Telephone and Electronics (GTE) built up a large interest in Thorn, with the potential of a merger rumoured. In the 1960s, GTE shared their technical knowledge of colour television tubes from their now subsidiary, Sylvania Electric Products, with Thorn.

GTE sold its shares in 1968 following the acquisition of Radio Rentals. They set up a joint venture in the 1970s to try and break into the UK telephone equipment market. GT&E was later replaced by Ericsson of Sweden who wanted a foothold in the UK equipment market and who eventually bought out Thorn's interest.

The Thorn Group's other notable brands over the years included Rumbelows (electrical goods), Thorn Kidde (fire protection) and TMD (microwave equipment).

== Merger with EMI ==
Thorn merged with the EMI Group in October 1979, to form Thorn EMI.

During the late 1980s and early 1990s, Thorn EMI sought out a buyer for its electronics wing, but failed to conclude any deal. On 16 August 1996, Thorn EMI shareholders voted in favour of de-merging Thorn. Thereafter, the electronics and rentals divisions were divested as Thorn plc.

== Post demerger ==
In July 1998, it was announced that Future Rentals, a subsidiary of the Japanese investment bank Nomura Group, would acquire Thorn in exchange for £980 million ($1.63 billion). Two years later, the company was transferred buyout specialists Terra Firma Capital Partners, which set up the BrightHouse chain. In June 2007, the remainder of the company was sold to a private buyer in June 2007.

Big Brown Box was launched in Australia in 2008 by Thorn, and was later sold to Appliances Online, a subsidiary of Winning Appliances, in 2011. The site was an online retailer of AV equipment, consumer electronics, and appliances.

== See also ==
- Thorn Lighting
