= Thorn Lighting =

UK business

Thorn Lighting Ltd.
- Company type: Private
- Industry: Lighting
- Founded: 29 March 1928
- Founder: Sir Jules Thorn
- Headquarters: London, England
- Area served: Worldwide
- Products: Professional luminaires and controls
- Revenue: €109 million (2020)
- Number of employees: more than 1,000 (2015)
- Parent: Zumtobel Group
- Website: www.thornlighting.com

Thorn Lighting Ltd, a subsidiary of the Zumtobel Group, is a global supplier of both outdoor and indoor luminaires and integrated controls.

Thorn was founded when Sir Jules Thorn started The Electric Lamp Service Company Ltd, in 1928, dealing in incandescent filament lamps. In 1936, renamed Thorn Electrical Industries, the company was floated on the London Stock Exchange. Continuous post World War II expansion followed and the organisation seized a variety of lighting, engineering and consumer electronics businesses, merging with EMI in 1979 to create Thorn EMI, which itself demerged in the year 1996.

In 1994, following a leveraged management buy-out, Thorn Lighting Ltd floated on the London Stock Exchange as TLG plc (the Thorn Lighting Group) until it was acquired by Wassall plc four years later. In 2000, Wassall plc was purchased in order to merge TLG with the luminaire business of the Zumtobel Group, an acquisition financed with the assistance of private equity firm KKR who subsequently reduced its position. Thorn is now fully owned by the Zumtobel Group.

== History ==
=== Birth of the company ===
The Thorn brand started life as the Electric Lamp Service Company, which was later incorporated by Jules Thorn on 29 March 1928, importing incandescent filament lamps and radio valves from the continent. Faced with increased import duties, introduced to aid British manufacturing, Jules Thorn bought his first lighting factory, the Atlas Lamp Works Ltd in Edmonton, north London in 1932 and began making light bulbs by the end of 1933. In 1936 the company went public as Thorn Electrical Industries. The same year they acquired the freehold property known as Atlas Works, which they previously leased.

=== 1940s and 1950s ===
The lamp businesses prospered until 1939 when production was geared to military needs. When war broke out, a second lamp site, run by the Vale Royal Electric Lamp Company, was bought in nearby Tottenham in case Edmonton was bombed.

When World War II ended, Jules Thorn continued expansion through investing in new plants, partnerships and acquisitions, including the opening of an incandescent lamp operation in Merthyr Tydfil, South Wales in 1947; a technology transfer with Sylvania Electric Products to mass-produce tubular fluorescent lamps in Enfield, north London and taking over 51% of Ekco-Ensign Electric (Ekco) in 1950, which added a further incandescent lamp factory – in Preston, Lancashire.

In 1951, Thorn took over Smart & Brown (Engineers) Ltd's luminaire factory at Spennymoor, near Durham. In the mid-1950s specialist incandescent lamp factories were opened in Buckie, Scotland and in Wimbledon, London (the Omega Electric Lamp Works Ltd).

In 1957 they brought all the lighting activities under Atlas Lighting Limited.

Between 1952 and 1964 Thorn established additional overseas connections, including a controlling interest in an Italian lamp manufacturer (SIVI Illuminazione SpA) and plants in Australia, South Africa and New Zealand, followed by agencies in the Middle East and Hong Kong, the latter with Jardine Pacific.

In September 1959 a new London-based headquarters was opened. Thorn House, designed by Sir Basil Spence, was at the time England's tallest office block.

=== 1960s ===
In 1964, driven by the need to compete more effectively in world markets, Thorn merged its lighting interests with those of Associated Electrical Industries (AEI) to form British Lighting Industries Ltd, taking a controlling 65% share (the remaining 35% being acquired three years later). AEI Lamp and Lighting brought to the BLI group three significant lighting interests: British Thomson-Houston (BTH) which owned major factories, especially at Melton Road in Rushey Mead, Leicester in the East Midlands of England (producing discharge lamps) and in Hereford, near the Welsh border (making luminaires), and sold lamps under the ‘Mazda’ brand; Metropolitan-Vickers (MV) which drew supplies from the BTH factories, selling them under the 'Metrovick' brand; and the Edison & Swan Electric Light Company (Ediswan), which had recently transferred its factory at Ponders End and ‘Royal Ediswan’ brand over to BTH.

Within a year of its formation, BLI reorganised - consolidating laboratories, factories, and selling functions - to operate under just three main brands: Atlas, Mazda and Ekco (the remaining 49% interest in Ekco-Ensign being secured in 1966). Once complete, in 1969, the BLI name was changed to Thorn Lighting Ltd and subsequently the Ekco and Atlas brand names were replaced by the Thorn name.

Substantial export growth followed, quickly earning a Queen's Award for Export Achievement, in 1968, and five years later Romford Export Centre opened, stocking over 10,000 items.

=== 1970s and 1980s ===
By 1976 over 50% of sales were from outside the United Kingdom. 1979 saw Thorn acquire Gebr Kaiser GmbH & Co. Leuchten K.G, a West German manufacturer of lighting fittings, and two years later close the Tottenham lamp factory.

In 1987 the purchase of the Jarnkonst group of Nordic light fitting companies and closure of the Buckie lamp factory signalled a new drive by parent Thorn EMI to trade an export and ‘colonies’ mentality for a multi-cultural, international outlook, one that took account of the forthcoming Single European Act. Gaining critical mass in lighting fixtures – defined as 10% market share in any one county – was identified as a priority.

In 1988 Thorn EMI bought the French group Holophane to gain access to its luminaire subsidiary, Europhane. The Jardine Pacific relationship in Asia was developed into an 18-year joint-venture, and the lighting brands of Sydney based Howard Smith were acquired.

=== 1990s ===
On 14 November 1990, Thorn announced that it had agreed to sell its principal light source interests to GE Lighting of the United States. Under the agreement, GE acquired the lamp plants at Enfield, Leicester and Wimbledon, as well as Thorn's 51% in SIVI Illuminazione in Italy and 100% holding in Gluhlampenfabrik Jahn, a small specialist manufacturer in Germany. Thorn subsequently closed its Merthyr Tydfil lamp factory, consolidated its UK distribution centres and sold its South African business. In 1991, Thorn won Management Today's Business in Europe Award.

Using Hong Kong as a platform, the company entered Macau, Taiwan, Singapore, Malaysia, Thailand, South Korea and Japan, while additional offices and agents were established in Eastern Europe. In 1992, placing staff in Jardine offices throughout mainland China secured more projects (at £35m Hong Kong International Airport became, and remains today, Thorn's largest ever contract) and laid the groundwork for local manufacturing. The Guangzhou fluorescent fittings factory opened in 1996 and Tianjin followed a year later, making road and tunnel luminaires. That same year, an interest in Thorn India was established. European activities centred on the purchase of Jakobsson in Denmark.

On-going consolidation in the late 1990s saw the closure of the Hereford factory and luminaire production transfer from the Kaiser Leuchten factory to other sites.

=== 2000s ===
The new millennium marked a new beginning as the Zumtobel Group invested heavily in Thorn, particularly in technological innovation, and consolidating the former regionally structured production operations of Zumtobel and Thorn into a single worldwide supply chain. It also sought organic growth in clearly defined regions and market sectors.

In 2006, the Zumtobel Group sold Thorn's airfield ground lighting activities (Thorn AFL) to the Swedish airport specialist Safegate, and two years later merged two former luminaire production facilities to form a new plant at Wetherill Park, Sydney.

In 2009, Thorn invested in a new factory, laboratory and training and exhibition complex (the Thorn Academy of Light) in Spennymoor. The Distribution Centre at the former site nearby was retained. The plant was named UK Factory of the Year for 2009. This year also saw Thorn and Hess AG of Germany enter into a long-term sales partnership for outdoor lighting products. Initially, activity centred on Germany, where Hess’ subsidiary, Vulkan, marketed Thorn's range, but further agreements were reached in 2011, extending Thorn rights to Hess products in France, East and Southeast Europe, and the UK and Ireland.

== Product innovation timeline ==
Year	Innovation
1948	Become the first British lighting company to mass-produce fluorescent tubes. One of the first installations of Atlas fluorescent lamps was in the Westminster City Library, London, opened in July.
1952	Chief Chemist Dr Peter Ranby developed a new range of phosphors which led to the introduction of the White “3500K” lamp with a colour appearance midway between daylight and warm white.
1954	Introduced its flagship product, the Atlas Popular Pack – the first mass-produced fitting to be sold complete with its tube as a single package.
1955	Launched the Alpha One lantern, the first hermetically sealed and injection moulded optical system for road lighting. Designer: Richard Stevens.
1957	Introduced a new form of entertainment at Woburn Abbey, the Atlas Aurama system. This advanced Son et Lumiere show was controlled by electronic dimming.
1962	Introduced the VASI (visual approach slope indicator), developed in conjunction with the Royal Aircraft Establishment, to aid aircraft landing.
1963	Developed the electroluminescent Image Retaining Panel for X-ray screens and radar scanning.
1964	Introduced Q-File, the electronic lighting control system, designed in conjunction with the BBC, to improve theatre and TV lighting.
1965	Mass-produced Flashcubes for photography, developed in association with Sylvania and Kodak.
1967	Launched the first twin-filament tungsten halogen car headlamp, allowing drivers to use either full beam or dipped lights (given an AA National Motoring Award for road safety) and manufactured high pressure sodium lamps. Supplied lighting for Britain's new motorways, a section of the M4 near Heathrow Airport with 140 W SLI/H lamps in Alpha 6 lanterns.
1970	Developed Magicube X with Kodak, a photographic flash cube not requiring a battery and the CSI (compact source iodide) lamp for floodlighting, outside filming and studio work.
1972	Became the first lighting company to win the Queen's Award to Industry for Technical Innovation (developing halogen lamps). Also the first manufacturer to offer a complete integrated lighting, heating and ventilation system with the introduction of ‘Arena’ – a new concept in commercial architecture.
1976	Introduced the 70 W high pressure sodium lamp.
1981	Launched two major improvements in fluorescent lighting: an energy saving replacement for the ordinary light bulb (the 2D compact fluorescent lamp) and the high frequency electronic ballast (exhibited at Hannover Messe, Germany).
1984	Developed the Haloheat cooker hob with halogen heat lamps.
1987	Manufactured a range of low wattage single ended metal halide and dichroic tungsten halogen lamps and fittings.
1988	Developed the C-VAS lighting management system for offices.
1989	The Aria spotlight and Modulight fluorescent win Die gute Industrieform design awards at the Hannover Fair, Germany.
1991	Launched Sensa, the first independent, intelligent lighting management fitting for offices.
2000	The Sensa 2 intelligent luminaire was voted a Millennium product by the Design Council.
2006	Introduced the Orus low-level road lantern, which won an NICEIC award for best electrical product innovation.
2010	The StyLED road lantern won a “Label del’Observeur du design 11” award given by the French Agency for the Promotion of Industrial Creation (APIC) and the new PopPack was voted Innovative Lighting Product of the Year by Electrical Times. Thorn, together with Cambridge Display Technology and Durham University, won a Technology & Innovation Award, for addressing fundamental issues over the performance and production of light emitting polymers.
