= River Patrol =

River Patrol may refer to:

- River Patrol (film), a 1948 British film directed by Ben R. Hart
- River Patrol (video game), a 1981 Japanese arcade game
