= Ferguson Electronics =

Radio and set top box company

Ferguson Electronics (formerly known as Ferguson Radio Corporation) is an electronics brand and former company specialising in small electronics items such as radios and set top boxes.

== History ==
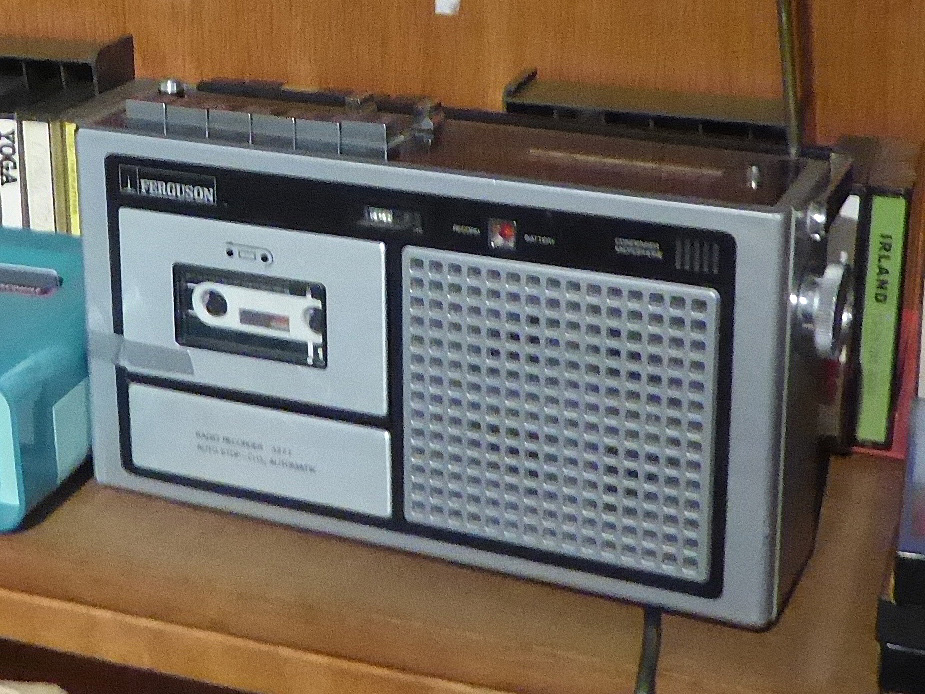
Ferguson portable radio cassette recorder. This model also features the logo of Thorn, which owned Ferguson between the late 1950s and the late 1980s.

=== Early history and mainstream success ===
Ferguson is one of the older electronics companies, alongside Ultra, Dynatron, Pye and Bush in the United Kingdom. It was originally an American–Canadian pre-War company making radio sets for the U.K. market based upon contemporary American models. On 21 January 1935, it was incorporated as a private limited company and Jules Thorn became chairman in 1936. After World War II, it became Ferguson Radio Corporation, making radio receivers and, later, televisions. By 1944, Thorn's group, Thorn Electrical Industries, was distributing all of the company's domestic radio production. On 9 July 1946, Thorn sold the company to Thorn Electrical Industries for £150,000. Later still, it became part of the British Radio Corporation. The Ferguson name continued to be used by Thorn, and its successor Thorn EMI.

Throughout the company's early history, Ferguson products were very popular across its wide customer base. By the early 1960s its wide product range included a most comprehensive range of audio and TV equipment. Small, battery-operated portable transistor radios to solid oak 6 ft wide hydraulic lid radiograms sporting fully automatic stackable Garrard turntables, multi-channel radios and 2-foot-wide stereo speakers were commonplace in many UK households. Open reel tape recorders and hi-fis followed.

Sales held well, with new introductions during the 1980s including personal cassette players, CD players and video recorders.

=== Sale to Thomson and withdrawal from market ===
The 1980s saw much competition from foreign brands such as JVC, Tandy, Hitachi and Sanyo. This took its toll on the Ferguson brand and in 1987 it was sold off to the French electronics company Thomson. Thomson group itself subsequently withdrew from the competitive European consumer electronics market.

=== Licensing under Thomson/Technicolor ===
Following its withdrawal from the market, Thomson SA- which later rebranded as Technicolor - licensed the Ferguson name to several third-party distributors in the UK.

Initially it was licensed to DSGi (the owner of the Dixons and Currys retail electronics chains). DSGi ceased using it in 2006 and competitor Comet took up the licence and used it until 2012. Comet used the brand on Freeview and Freesat set-top boxes, DVD players and DAB radios. (Although Comet went into administration in November 2012, with the subsequent closure of all stores, it had already discontinued using the Ferguson brand earlier in the year.)

In 2017 the Ferguson brand was again relaunched under license, this time by British manufacturer Cello Electronics for a new range of televisions manufactured in County Durham.

=== Sale to Talisman Brands/Established ===
In 2022, Technicolor's licensing business- including the rights to the Ferguson name and a number of other brands- was acquired by Talisman brands (d/b/a Established Incorporated, stylized as established.inc).

== UK Trademarks ==
As of April 2013, there were several Ferguson trademarks registered for class 09, audio visual equipment, in the UK: EU010787471 Registered by Ferguson Sp. z.o.o. 04/04/2012 but opposed and UKUK00000652009 EU003131927 Registered by Thomson Multimedia now Technicolor, dates back to 26/09/1946.
