= Radio Rentals =

Company founded in 1930 by Percy Perring-Thoms

- Industry: Domestic appliance rentals
- Founded: 1930; 96 years ago in Brighton, Sussex, UK
- Founder: Percy Perring-Thoms
- Defunct: 2000
- Fate: Merged with Granada Limited

Radio Rentals was founded in 1930 by Percy Perring-Thoms in Brighton, Sussex, UK, to rent out radio receiving sets. It later offered televisions and videorecorders for rent. Radio Rentals was the largest television rental group in the UK and claimed that at its peak it had more than two million customers, more than 500 shops, 3,600 technicians, 2,700 skilled installers and a large ancillary staff. It had sales and service locations across the UK; the Radio Rentals logo being a common sight on many High Streets. The business still trades in Australia.

== History ==
Radio Rentals started life in Boyces Street, Brighton, Sussex, England. As well as renting radio receiving sets, it also guaranteed their service and maintenance. It was the first such business in the United Kingdom. Turnover in the first year was £780 (equivalent to £44,081 in 2025).

A limited company, Radio Rentals Limited, was incorporated on 19 August 1933 and by 1936 had shown rapid growth, becoming the largest such organisation in Great Britain, adding 12,000 subscribers in 1935-36 and covering almost the whole of the home counties, the Midlands and the South of England. At the time, the company's headquarters were at 92 Regent Street in London and had branch offices and showrooms in Birmingham, Brighton, Canterbury, Croydon, Southampton and Southend-on-Sea. A maintenance and services depot was in Kennington. The radio receiving sets were made by E. K. Cole Limited.

Radio Rentals operated mainly in the UK, but opened an Australian branch in Sydney in 1937. In the 1960s, the group expanded into Italy with Telenoleggio.

The growth of BBC Television and then ITV after the Second World War encouraged more people to want TV sets, but they were expensive, creating an opportunity for Radio Rentals and its competitors to offer them at a monthly rental price which was much more affordable.

By 1959 all Radio Rentals sets were made by a subsidiary company, Mains Radio Gramophone, based in Bradford. In October 1960, Radio Rentals acquired the Baird Company and in December 1960, Mains Radio Gramophone changed its name to Baird Television.

Radio Rentals acquired Recordacall in 1962, a company renting telephone answering equipment, which started to be made by Baird Television. In October 1962, the group acquired Dawes Radio Group.

In 1964, Radio Rentals merged with Rentaset (previously known as Relay Exchanges), Joseph Robinson's similar company, which also owned Goodmans, bringing the group's outlets to 750 and assets to £55 million. Founder-chairman and managing director Perring-Thoms died in July 1964. Robinson later became chairman of the combined group. By 1968, Radio Rentals was the largest television rental group in Great Britain with 1.6 million subscribers.

Vista Home Rentals, a rental company based in Scotland, was acquired in March 1966.

With the coming of colour services, initially only on BBC2, a further opportunity for renting was created. In 1968, Radio Rentals was acquired for £155 million by Thorn Electrical Industries, who were the second largest television rental group in Great Britain with one million subscribers, giving the merged company one third of the market and 1,300 rental outlets. By the time the government approved the merger, the value of the bid had increased to £180 million. Radio Rentals joined with Thorn's Domestic Electrical Rentals (DER) chain as part of Thorn Television Rentals (TTR), though the two companies were run completely separately, with different staff and vehicles. On 15 November 1969 colour broadcasts on both BBC channels and the ITV network became available from the main transmitter sites around the UK. This led to a boom in rentals of TV sets.

One other, smaller High Street TV rental companies was also acquired/established by the Thorn Television Rentals group: Multi-Broadcast.

The last Baird TV models that were supplied by Radio Rentals to contain a genuine Baird (rather than a Thorn)-manufactured chassis was the dual-standard (405 and 625-line) 710 series. Legend has it that in the 1970s, Radio Rentals was the only TV rental company under the TTR umbrella who were allowed to produce full (from floor to waist) height cabinets on castors. The other companies had to use more squat cabinets placed on stands.

By the late 1970s videorecorders had appeared on the market, but at first they were expensive. Only 5% of UK households had videorecorders in 1980. Radio Rentals elected to offer Baird branded JVC VHS machines from 1977 onwards.

In 1980 TTR, and thus Radio Rentals, became part of the merged Thorn EMI.

With the advent of satellite broadcasting in the 1980s Radio Rentals offered a range of equipment for rent, enabling more viewers to watch both Sky Television services and British Satellite Broadcasting services (these broadcasters later merged to form British Sky Broadcasting).

Radio Rentals also offered a small range of white goods, starting with refrigerators in 1960. In later years, these white goods were mainly from Philips and Whirlpool.

The urge to rent instead of buy reduced as domestic electronics became cheaper and more reliable, with greater use of integrated circuits and improved design. The company went through many restructurings, shedding staff and rebranding itself. In common with other rental brands, it could not sustain a viable business model and ceased to trade, merging with Granada Limited's rental arm in 2000 to form Boxclever.

== Oceania ==
Radio Rentals Australia logo

Thorn operated over 90 Radio Rentals stores within Australia, and 28 stores in New Zealand under the name DTR. Radio Rentals stores in South Australia trade under the name RR Rentlo Reinvented due to an independent business trading as Radio Rentals. An independently owned chain operated 19 stores within South Australia; however is not in any way related to Radio Rentals owned by Thorn Australia Pty Ltd, and closed its stores in 2019 including areas like Queensland (R.T. Edwards). Radio Rentals also closed all its stores in 2020 but continues to trade.

The Australian branch of Radio Rentals began in 1937 with the opening of a single store on Market Street, Sydney. Since this date, Radio Rentals continued to expand and open stores across Australia, including the launch of 'Rentlo' in South Australia. In 1960, Radio Rentals Limited in the UK took a controlling interest in Radio Rentals Pty Limited. In April 2015 Rentlo was rebranded to RR Rentlo Reinvented. Radio Rentals is a household appliance, technology and furniture rental service. Today, Radio Rentals and RR Rentlo Reinvented have more than 90 stores Australia wide and more than 500 employees. The Australian stores continued to trade under the Thorn Group, with James Marshall as the current CEO and managing director, appointed in 2014. On 23 April 2020, due to the COVID-19 induced retail downturn, Radio Rentals announced the permanent closure of its 62 bricks-and-mortar stores and selected warehouses, continuing as a purely online business.

In 2008, the Thorn Group, who operates Radio Rentals, launched Big Brown Box; an online retailer of brown goods and consumer technology gadgets. The site later expanded to include computers and whitegoods. Thorn Group decided to offload the business in November 2010, with the CEO, John Hughes, saying that while Thorn Group "still believes strategically in online and the potential of BigBrownBox.com.au" the company had to take a pragmatic view on the business given the group's limited resources. Big Brown Box was later purchased and relaunched by Appliances Online.

== Centrepay controversy ==
In 2015, a report by Credit Suisse found that for the financial year 2014/15, A$90 million of Radio Rentals and RR Rentlo Reinvented Australia's total revenue of A$197 million came from payments made by government benefit recipients using the Commonwealth Department of Human Services direct debit Centrepay system. The report also stated that around half of this amount, approximately A$45 million, related to the purchase of entertainment items such as smart phones and televisions.

== See also ==
- BrightHouse (retailer)
