= Big Brown =

Big Brown may refer to:

- Big Brown (horse), an American thoroughbred racehorse
- Big brown bat, a North American bat
- Big Brown, a nickname for the delivery company United Parcel Service
- Big Brown Box, an Australian online retailer
- Big Brown (poet) (1920–1980), American street performer
- Big Brown, a nickname of retired UFC fighter Brendan Schaub
- Big Brown Power Plant, a former power plant in Texas
