= Thorn EMI Computer Software =

Software house division of Thorn EMI

Thorn EMI Computer Software (also known as Thorn EMI Video Programmes) was a British video games software house set up in the early 1980s as part of the now-defunct British conglomerate Thorn EMI.

They released a number of games in the early 1980s using the same "Thorn EMI Video" label as their home video releases. Initially these were for the Atari 8-bit computers, and later for the ZX Spectrum, Commodore 64 and VIC-20 formats.

In 1984, the Thorn EMI name was dropped in favour of Creative Sparks as the company felt its "big corporate" associations were inappropriate for the video games market. A budget label, Sparklers, was created in early 1985 to publish titles at £2.50. Later in 1985, Creative Sparks, Sparklers and the distribution company, Creative Sparks Distribution (CSD) gained independence from Thorn EMI after a management buyout.

In July 1987, six months after buying software company Mikro-Gen for a "substantial" sum, Creative Sparks went into receivership with debts estimated at up to £1.5million.

The back catalogue of the company was acquired by Tynesoft, Alternative Software and Maynard International (Top Ten Software). The former management at CSD went on to form Software Publishing Associates, owners of the Crysys and Pirate Software labels.

== Releases ==
Many of the company's games listed below were issued on more than one label over the years. A typical example is River Rescue, first released under the Thorn EMI label, then later sold (with updated artwork) under the Creative Sparks brand. This was followed by a budget release on the company's own Sparklers label then (after Creative Sparks' demise) another budget reissue by Alternative Software.

=== 'Thorn EMI' label ===
- Blockade Runner
- Carnival Massacre
- Cribbage and Dominoes
- Darts
- Gold Rush
- Home Financial Management
- Mutant Herd
- Orc Attack
- River Rescue
- Road Racer
- Submarine Commander
- Snooker and Billiards
- The VIC Music Composer
- Tower of Evil
- Volcanic Planet
- 8-Ball and Tournament Pool

=== 'Creative Sparks' label ===
- Black Hawk
- Computer War
- Countdown to Meltdown
- Danger Mouse In Double Trouble
- Danger Mouse In The Black Forest Chateau
- Delta Wing
- Snodgits
- Special Delivery
- Stagecoach
- Story House
- Tower of Evil
- Danger Mouse in Making Whoopee

=== 'Sparklers' label ===
- Bargain Basement
- Desert Burner
- Doombase
- Quackshot
- Smudge & the Moonees
- St Crippens
