= Orc Attack =

1983 video game

- Publishers: Thorn EMI; Creative Sparks; Top Ten
- Designer: Dean Lock
- Programmers: Atari 8-bit Dean Lock; ZX Spectrum; Phil Snell; Commodore 64; Chris James
- Platforms: Atari 8-bit, Commodore 64, ZX Spectrum
- Release: 1983: Atari; 1984: C64, Spectrum
- Genre: Fixed shooter
- Modes: Single-player, multiplayer

Orc Attack is a fixed shooter video game written by Dean Lock for Atari 8-bit computers and published in 1983 by Thorn EMI. The game was re-released, along with Commodore 64 and ZX Spectrum ports, when Thorn rebranded as Creative Sparks, and later at budget price by Sparklers and Top Ten. In Orc Attack, the player protects a castle wall by dropping boulders on ladder climbing orcs. Though the visuals are low resolution, Orc Attack has a high level of violence.

== Gameplay ==
The player dropped a rock on a ladder with two Orcs (Atari 8-bit).

The player moves back and forth along the top of a castle wall, defending it from orcs below which shoot arrows at the player and others which use ladders to scale the wall. The player can kill orcs and destroy ladders by picking up rocks from the left and right sides of the ramparts, then dropping them. Should an orc climb all the way to the top, the player can pick up a sword instead of a rock and kill it.

After a while, the rocks are replaced with boiling oil. Dropping oil starts a fire at the bottom of the screen which engulfs the orcs and ladders, ending the round. The number of orcs killed during the round is counted up.

As the game progresses, Ninja Orcs appear which can climb without a ladders. A sorcerer sends evil spirits against players.

== Reception ==
Reception

Award
Publication	Award
Crash	Crash Smash

Atari 8-bit magazine ANALOG Computing called Orc Attack "easily the most violent and gratuitously satisfying shoot-'em-up on the market today (although 'drop-'em-down' might be a more accurate label)." Arcade Express concluded, "Orc Attack combines fast-paced action with lots of strategy to produce a strong overall program"—8/10.

ZX Spectrum magazine CRASH gave Orc Attack a 91% rating.
