= Glover and Main =

British gas meter and stove manufacturer

Coordinates: 51°36′33″N 0°02′44″W

Glover and Main was a British manufacturer of gas meters and stoves located at Angel Road, Edmonton, London.

== History ==
T. Glover & Co manufactured gas meters at the Gothic Works from 1897. Thomas Glover invented the original diaphragm gas meter in 1843. The company later amalgamated with R & A Main gas stove makers. During the 20th century they became one of the largest manufacturers of gas cookers in the UK. A new factory was built in 1951 on part of the Gothic Works. The business was taken over by Thorn Electrical Industries in 1965. Production ceased in 1983.

The former Gothic Works was demolished late in the 20th century and is now known as Glover Close which is a retail area comprising a Tesco and an IKEA store which opened on 10 February 2005 where a serious crowd disturbance took place.
