= Granada Studios Tour =

Former theme park in Manchester, England

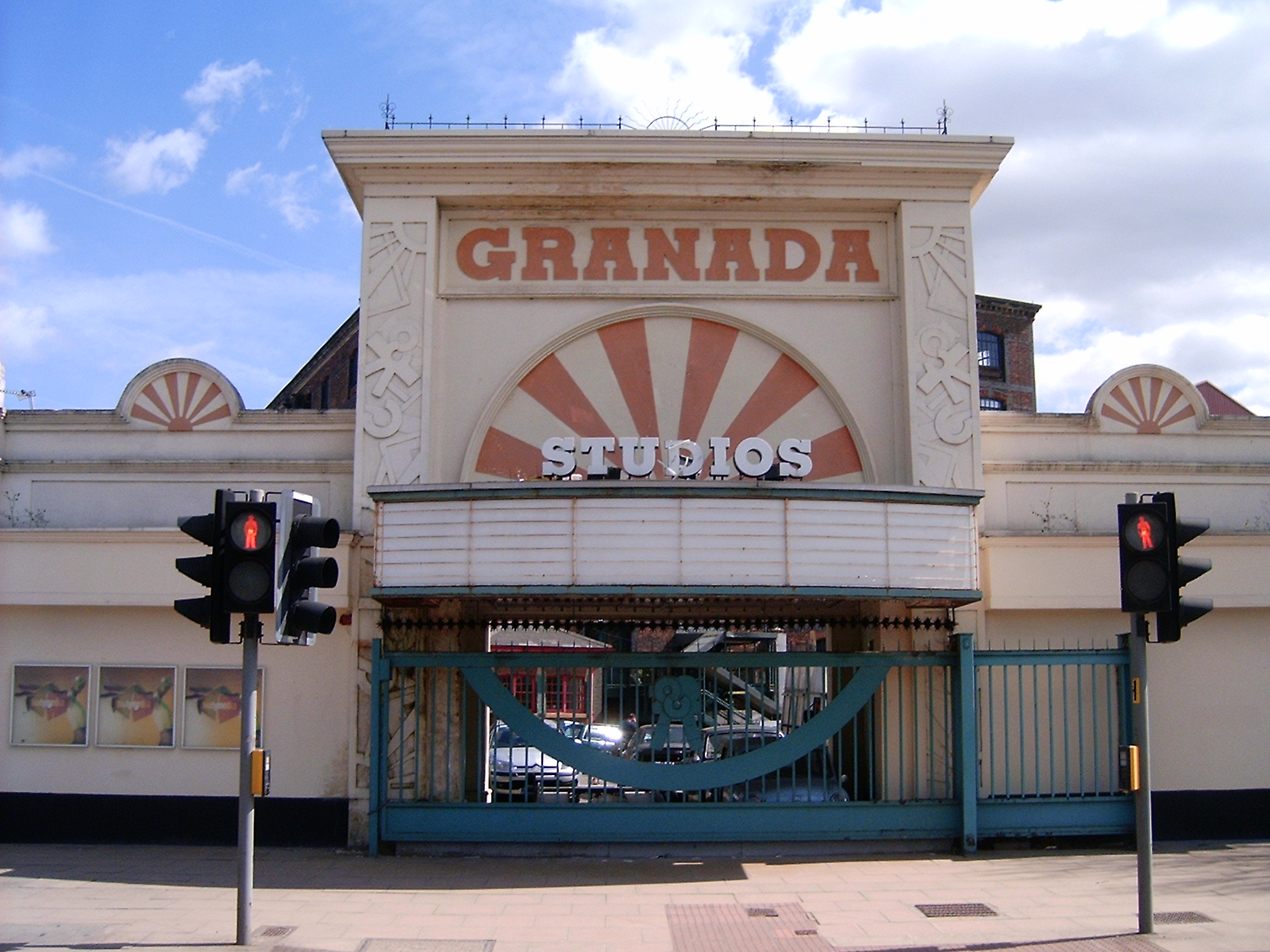
- Interactive map of Granada Studios Tour
- Location: Granada Studios, Castlefield, Manchester, England
- Coordinates: 53°28′42″N 2°15′27″W
- Opened: 1988
- Closed: 1999
- Owner: Granada Parks & Resorts

Granada Studios Tour was an entertainment theme park at the Granada Studios complex in Castlefield, Manchester, England, which operated from 1988 to 1999. The park was in the heart of Manchester city centre adjacent to the Granada House building.

The tour attracted over 5 million visitors, but visitor numbers were waning by the late 1990s, and Granada Television sought to prioritise other parts of its business such as the ONdigital service (which, under the name ITV Digital, soon failed). As a result, the Granada Studios Tour closed to the public in 1999, and for good in 2001. The Coronation Street set – part of the original theme park – was temporarily reopened to the public in April 2014 for a six-month period, and its popularity meant it stayed open until December 2015.

== History ==
=== Proposal ===
The park was the brainchild of Granada Television producer David Plowright, who had long been interested in developing the land around the Granada Studios complex in Manchester. Much of the land that Granada owned was derelict and underused.

Plowright's aim was to create a "Hollywood-on-the-Irwell", a reference to the River Irwell which runs through Manchester. Granada Group, the parent company of Granada Television, was initially pessimistic about Plowright's plans. Fortunately for Plowright, he gained the support of the Granada Television hierarchy, such as John Williams and commercial director Chris Mather, which managed to convince Granada Group to invest in the park.

A key part of the tour would be for visitors to walk down Coronation Street, but the Tour would also include the former bonded warehouse adjacent to the main Granada House building. Plowright ordered the renovation of the Victorian warehouse for the Studio Tour at a cost of £3m.

=== Opening ===
The Granada Studios Tour opened in July 1988 and quickly surpassed all expectations. A feasibility study prior to its opening estimated first year visitor figures of 250,000 to 275,000, but within eight months, the tour had 600,000 visitors.

== Overview ==
The exterior of the complex was a New York street setting replicating Times Square, complete with yellow cabs, large neon advertisements and entertainers role-playing police officers. This area was the site of the first exterior set of Coronation Street, used from 1968 until 1982 (chosen for the Victorian viaduct which lay behind the New York facade).

The guided tour itself, which lasted around an hour, comprised various mock sets from Granada productions including a recreation of Downing Street, the Sherlock Holmes-era Baker Street backlot set from The Adventures of Sherlock Holmes series, and the giant room from Return of the Antelope, where furniture was designed on a much larger scale to create the illusion of small humans. The lounge of 'Home Farm' from Emmerdale, and the café from Coronation Street were also mocked up for the tour.

In the early days of the Tours, a bus took visitors through a mockup of Checkpoint Charlie, and then down Baker Street towards Coronation Street, where they disembarked. This feature was later discarded, and the Baker Street set had a warehouse-style building erected around the outdoor set, creating an indoor street.

The focal point of the tour was the opportunity to walk down the actual cobbled street used in Coronation Street since 1982. The tour was closed on Mondays, as this was the day that the set was used for filming at the time.

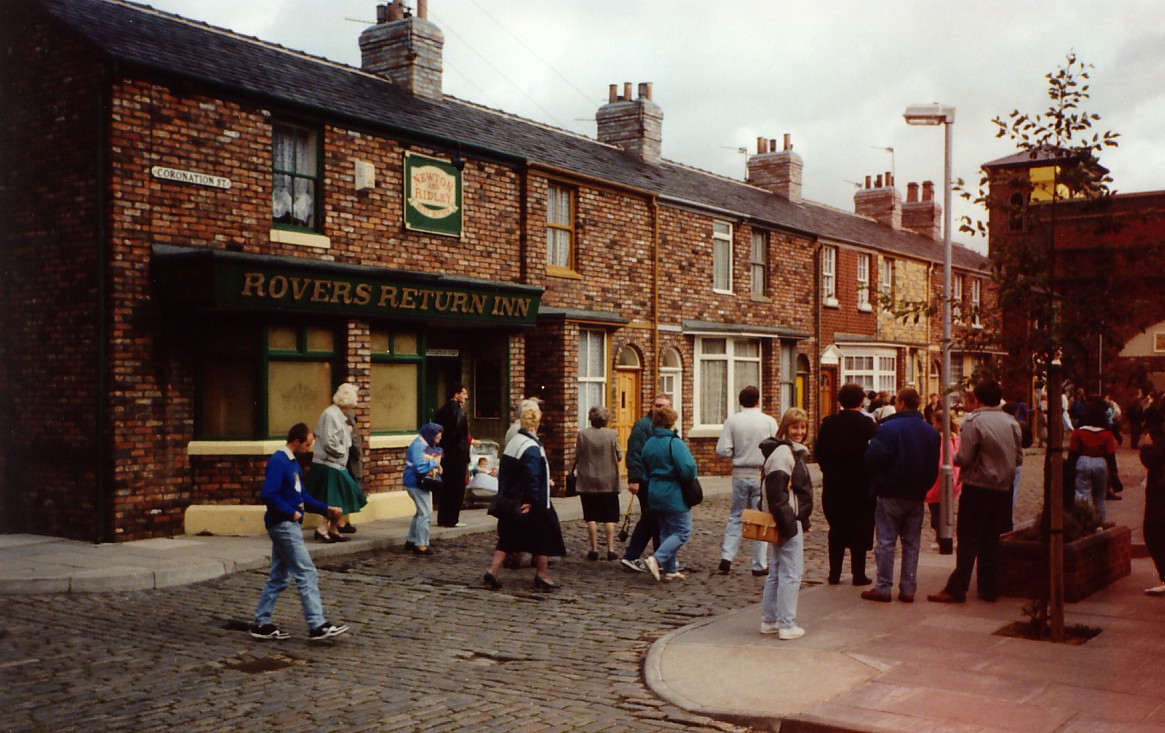
Tourists outside Coronation Street's Rovers Return Inn.

Live action shows were performed at intervals throughout each day, including a parody of a political debate in the House of Commons chamber set used for First Among Equals. This set was often used by other television productions wanting to set scenes in the Commons chamber, such as The New Statesman, and in 2002 was purchased by the scriptwriter Paul Abbott so that it could be used in his BBC drama serial State of Play. Abbott, himself a former Granada Television staff writer, bought it personally as the set would otherwise have been destroyed and he feared it would take too long to get the necessary money from the BBC. Abbott kept the set in storage in Oxford.

Visitors could also enjoy a drink in a replica of the Rovers Return, the pub in Coronation Street. In the adjacent cafeteria, a mockup of the bar from Emmerdale's Woolpack was also included.

Other attractions included the opportunity to appear in a special Coronation Street scene in the Rovers Return with the main characters, using the chroma key process. Also, a ride named MotionMaster was developed whereby people could watch a short adventure film while being strapped into chairs which moved in synchronisation with the action on the large screen. One such film was based upon the film Aliens, when the squad entered the base in a transporter. Latterly other fairground-style rides were installed, including a 3D film show. Granada Studios Tour had also featured the shop featured in Sooty & Co. One of the country's most famous Wurlitzer organs made regular concert appearances in an "old-style" venue, but following the closure, was sold to Folly Farm in Tenby.

In October 1997, Skytrak, the world's first flying roller coaster, opened at the Granada Studios Tour. The ride was named after an event from the Gladiators television series, and was the only roller coaster constructed by Skytrak International, a subsidiary of Fairport Engineering. It was a "solo coaster", having only one rider per car which along with a complicated boarding process limited capacity to between 200 and 240 riders per hour. The ride also suffered from reliability issues, and closed in 1998.

Bill Bryson visited the Tours and wrote about it in his book Notes from a Small Island. He praises highly the House of Commons show.

=== Closure ===
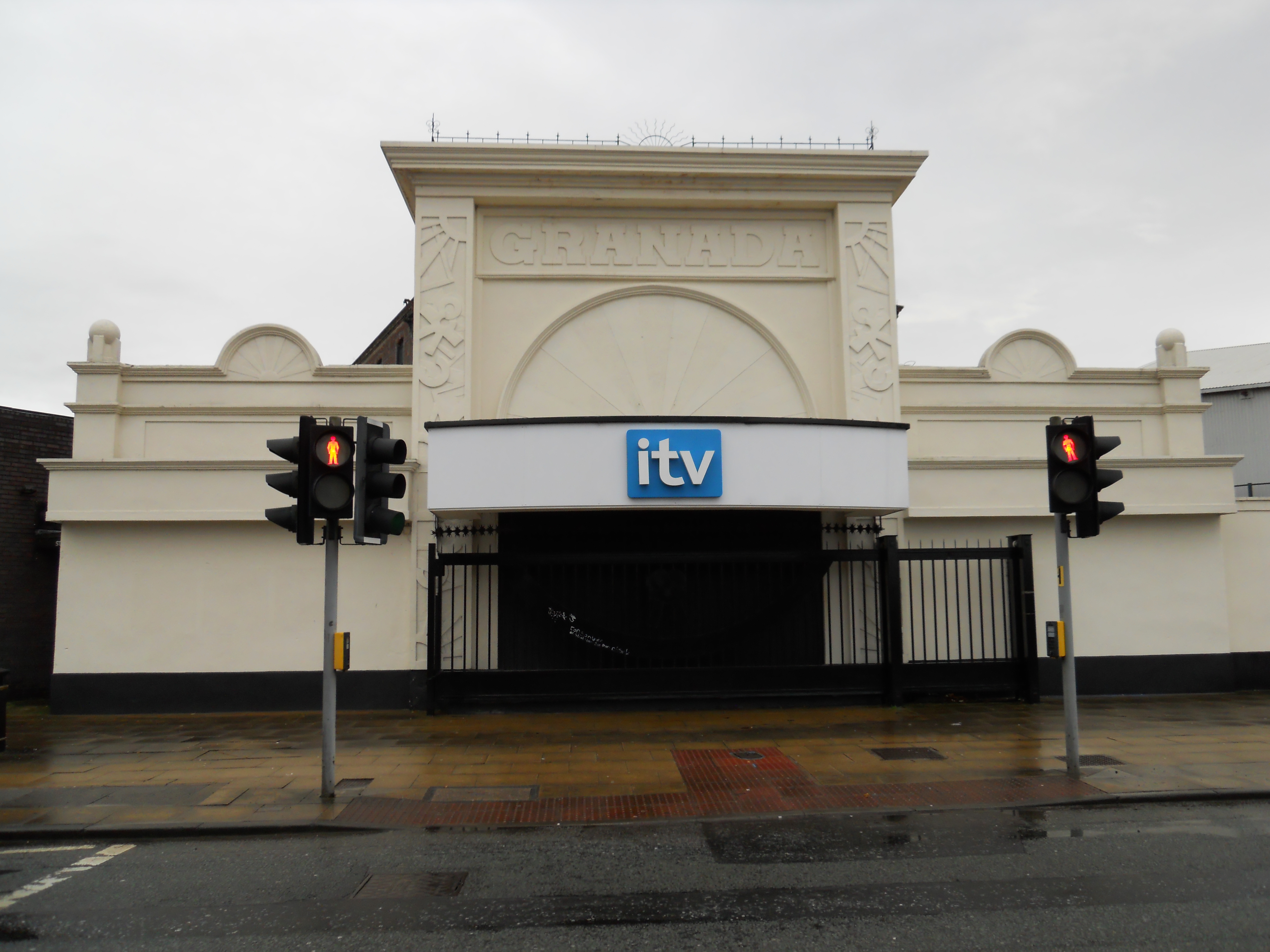
The Granada Studios Tour entrance lost its colour in 2011 and now bore the ITV logo. The embossed Granada is still present, the ITV logo has since been removed

As the 1990s drew to a close, the theme park gradually fell into neglect and disrepair, and visitor numbers fell. Granada was going through a period of unprecedented change and many of the company's divisions were sold off in the wake of OnDigital's collapse. The tour complex was seen as a loss-making enterprise and plans were made to close it, unbeknownst to the public at large, who always saw the Coronation Street visit as the most important part of the whole complex.

The formation of 3sixtymedia, a joint venture facilities company based primarily at Granada's Quay Street studios and co-owned by BBC Resources and Granada, spelled the final end for the Tours, as the company moved into the bonded warehouse on the site, and started using some of the other buildings (such as the Starlight Theatre) for additional studio and warehousing space.

For a short while before its final, abrupt closure in December 1999, the complex was open only to pre-booked parties, such as corporate events, fan club visits, and Manchester Mardi Gras' "Treat on the Street", a themed night time event during the August Bank Holiday weekend.

In the year 2000, one year after its closure, parts of the tour were demolished allowing Granada the opportunity to expand the set of Coronation Street. Work included a new viaduct (to allow filming on Rosamund Street without exposing the Quay Street Studios which run adjacent to the rear of the set), Roy's Rolls café, the renovation of the derelict Graffiti Club into a new medical centre, a new building yard, two shops joining the café and a few new houses. After the closure of the tour, the exterior set was seen more often in the soap.

The former Baker Street building was turned into a new studio for Coronation Street, named Stage Two, containing more studio sets.

In 2008, a rumour was circulated that ITV were considering reopening the tour as well as licensing real 'Rovers Return' pubs. These reports came to nothing, as it would have involved a considerable amount of site reorganisation, at a time when Granada were discussing a move to a smaller location in Trafford Park.

In March 2009, it was announced Coronation Street would stay on the Quay Street site "for the foreseeable future". Also, Granada's studios had become the home of shows displaced by the reorganisation of the Yorkshire Television studios in Leeds, including Channel 4's Countdown. However, following a change of hands at ITV management, talks between ITV and The Peel Group for the move to the Trafford Park site reopened in January 2010 leading to a deal which was finally announced in December 2010, under which Granada Television would vacate the Quay Street complex by 2013, and the area be sold off.

In 2012, it was reported that an application for heritage listing had been made to English Heritage on the premise that the site was important to the cultural history of the North West and nationally. The application included the Coronation Street set and Granada House building where the majority of Granada programmes have been produced since 1962. However, in June 2012, English Heritage announced that the request for Listed status had been rejected.

The Coronation Street set was reopened to the public from 2014 to 2015.

== Demolition ==
In August 2015, developers Allied London submitted a planning application for "demolition of existing buildings and structures including Stage 1, Coronation Street set and Lot, The Stables and Stage 2 Extension", intending to begin building work in autumn 2016. Consent was granted for the South Village project – a new neighbourhood of workshops, "innovative workspace", independent shops, 60 apartments and green space.

As of 2018 the replacement outdoor set for Coronation Street at MediaCityUK is open to the public.
