= Boxclever =

British electronic and domestic appliance rental chain

- Company type: Private
- Industry: Consumer Electronics; Major Appliances; Rentals
- Predecessor: Granada Rentals, Radio Rentals
- Founded: 2000
- Defunct: 2003 (original)
- Fate: Administration (original)
- Successor: Home Technology Finance Limited, (t/a Boxclever)
- Headquarters: Bedford, England
- Area served: United Kingdom
- Website: boxclever

Boxclever (styled as “boxclever”) is a British electronic and domestic appliance rental chain that was founded in 2000 by the merger of Radio Rentals and Granada Rentals. The company originally operated through high street stores but later moved to an online-only service. The company was sold to WestLB and went into administration in June 2003, causing WestLB to register their €650 million bad debt charge.

The company was bought out of administration in January 2005 by Fortress Investment Group for £135 million. Fortress and Cerberus sold the business to Weight Partners in May 2011.
