= Marconiphone =

English manufacturer of domestic receiving equipment

Marconiphone was an English manufacturer of domestic receiving equipment, notably radio receivers and reel-to-reel tape machines.

== Early history ==
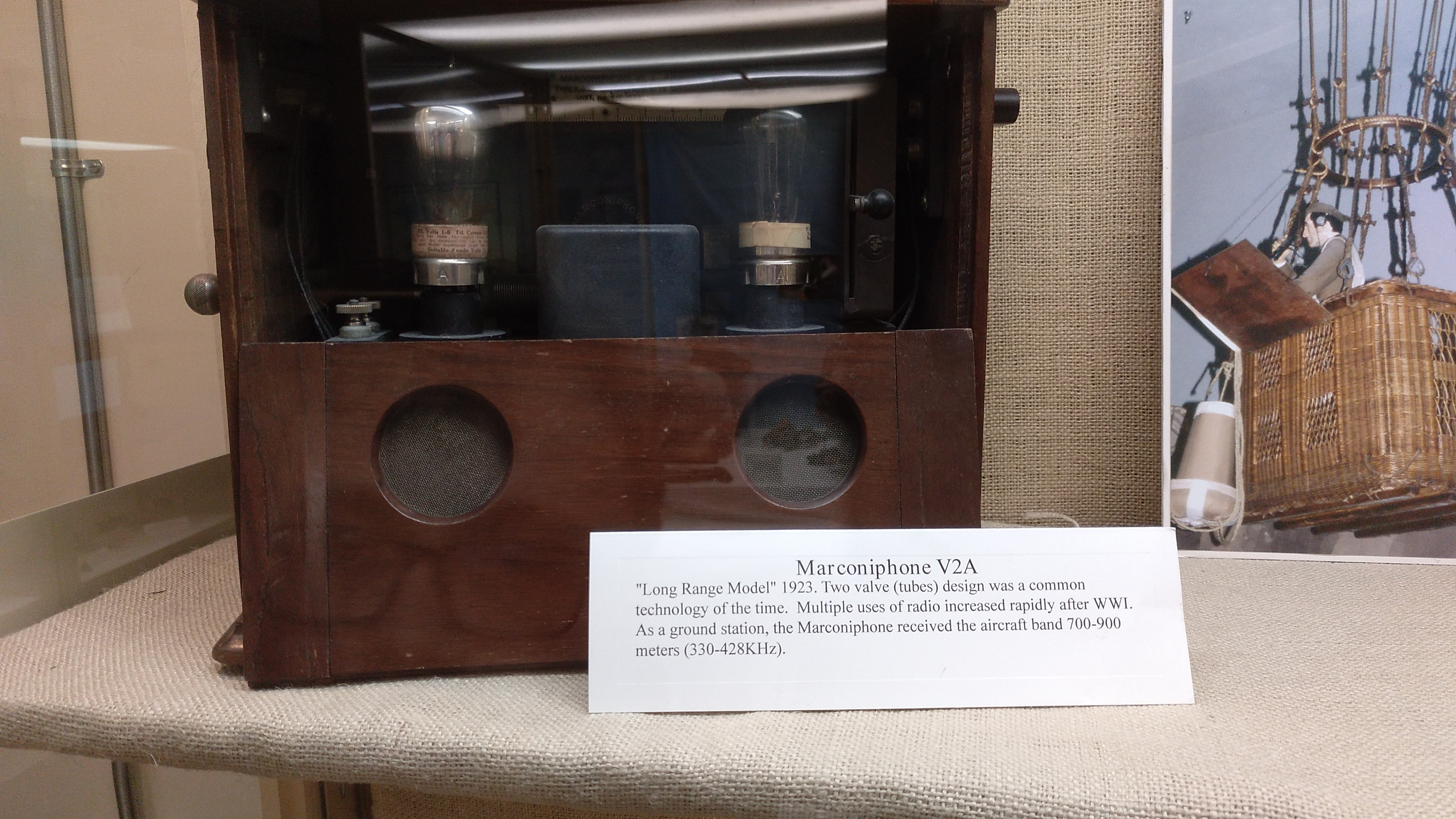

After World War I, the Marconi Company began producing non-industrial receivers, principally for the amateur market, at the Soho premises of The Marconi Scientific Instrument Company. In 1922, the Marconi Company formed the "Marconiphone" department, to design, manufacture and sell domestic receiving equipment. This equipment complied with Post Office specifications and tests, and was therefore awarded the BBC authorisation stamp; initially sets were made at the Chelmsford Works. In December 1923, the 'Marconiphone' department was formed as a subsidiary of the Marconi Company. Some Marconiphone Company sets were made at the Sterling Telephone Company (STC) Works at Dagenham. However, design and research of these domestic receivers still continued at Chelmsford.

== Gramophone Company ==
In December 1929, the Marconiphone was sold to the Gramophone Company, along with the right to use the trademark "Marconiphone" and the copyright signature "G. Marconi" on domestic receivers. The Marconi Company never re-entered the domestic radio market. In 1931 the Gramophone Company became Electric and Musical Industries (EMI) and produced domestic and radio receivers using the Marconiphone trademark.

In 1936, the Marconiphone company moved into the production of cathode ray tubes and television receivers and in 1953 they were still manufacturing television sets.

From 1957, Marconiphone receivers were made under licence by the British Radio Corporation, a subsidiary of Thorn Electrical Industries, and the products of the two companies became extremely similar.

== Mobile telephones ==
The Marconiphone brand was revived in the late 1980s and used by a division of GEC-Marconi for mobile phones. Phones made by companies such as NEC were given and additional small rectangular metal plate with the Marconiphone logo.

Marconi acted as a service provider for Cellnet and Vodafone in the UK before selling the customer base to Mercury in 1991.

== See also ==
- Gramophone Company
