= King Kong (1982 video game) =

1982 video game

- Publisher: Tigervision
- Programmer: Karl T. Olinger
- Platform: Atari 2600
- Release: NA: August 1982
- Genre: Platform
- Modes: Single-player, multiplayer

King Kong is a platform game programmed by Karl T. Olinger for the Atari 2600 and published by Tigervision in 1982. Based on the licensed King Kong character, the game is a clone of the first level of Donkey Kong. It was Tigervision's first cartridge release. Tiger Electronic Toys produced a handheld version, licensed to Tandy, the same year.

== Gameplay ==
King Kong for the Atari 2600

The objective is to rescue the girl by climbing ladders to the top of the screen while jumping over holes and autonomous bombs. Magic bombs are worth five times the points of regular bombs when jumped over. As in Donkey Kong, each level has a bonus that counts down. If it reaches zero, a life is lost.

There are settings for 1 or 2 players alternating turns, slow or fast bombs, and whether magic bombs exist.

== Reception ==
Ed Driscoll reviewed King Kong in The Space Gamer No. 58. Driscoll commented that "overall, it's a fun-to-play game, with some good graphics. Not bad for a first cartridge!"Electronic Games said that the game "presents a crude imitation of Donkey Kong's first scenario and replaces the barrels and flame creatures with what look like old-fashioned toilets, some of which have lit fuses". In a 4 out of 10 review, Arcade Express considered King Kong "a poor rendition of the giant ape" and said that it was somewhat easier to play than other climbing games.
