= Coronation Street sets =

Coordinates: 53.4703752°N 2.3025691°W

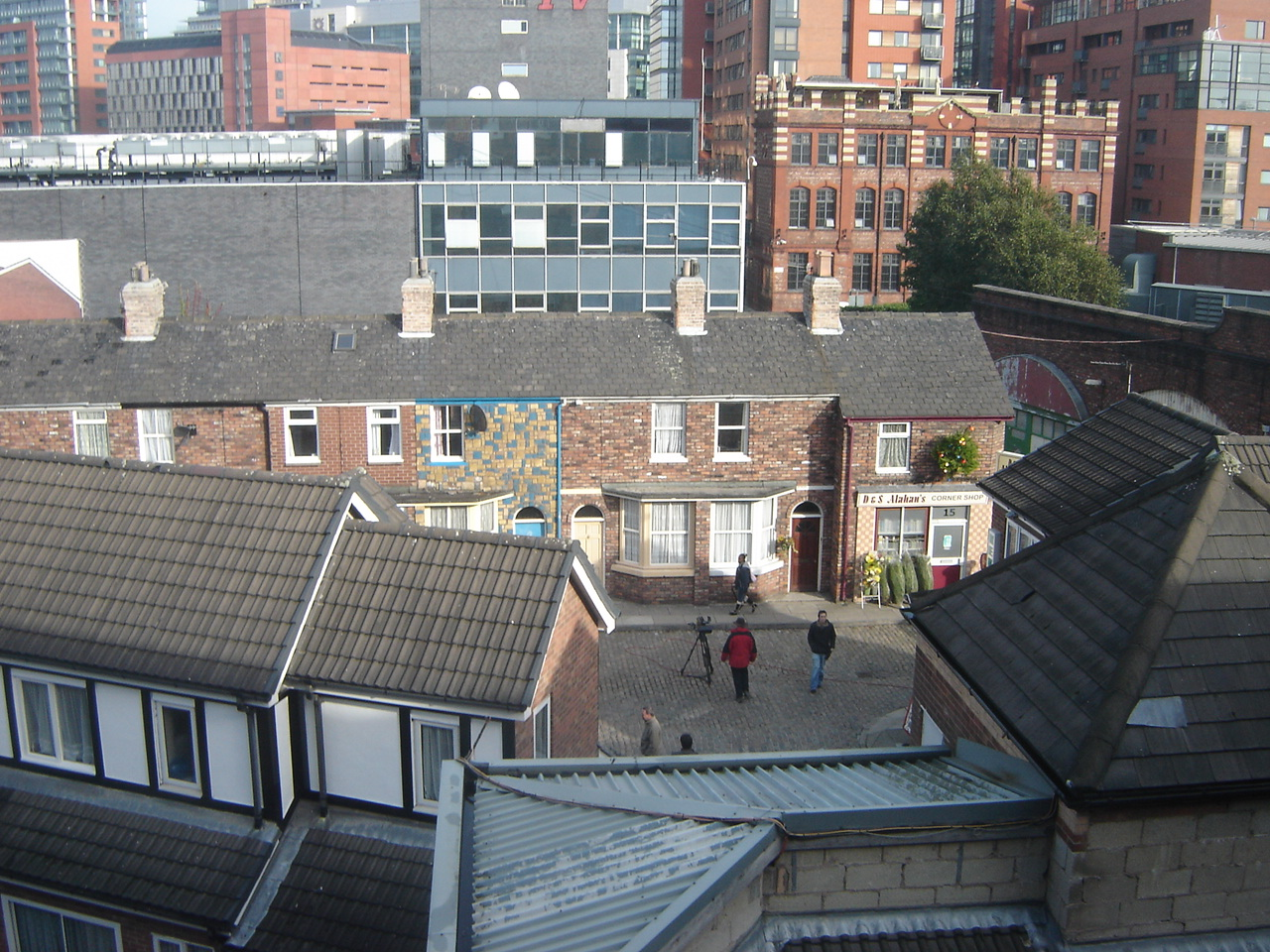
A partial image of the backlot of Granada Studios in Manchester city centre which housed the Coronation Street set from 1982 until 2013.

The sets of the British ITV soap opera Coronation Street have undergone four major and several less significant changes since the first broadcast in December 1960. Originally entirely indoors, in 1968 the original wooden set was moved outside, and shortly afterwards reconstructed in brick. In 1982 the set was entirely rebuilt in a new location. The current set, brought into use in 2013, is based at the ITV Trafford Wharf Studios backlot, MediaCityUK in Trafford.

It consists of early 20th-century red brick terraced houses (typical of the type found in towns and cities in the north of England), with a public house, The Rovers Return, at one end, and a corner shop at the other. The other side of the street consists of a factory, two shop units, a garage and three semi-detached houses, all appearing to have been constructed in the late 1980s.

== 1960–1982 ==
From 1960 until 1968, the complete set of Coronation Street (house interiors and exteriors) was erected inside one of Granada Television's studios in central Manchester, with the houses reduced to three-quarters scale. This small set was awkward for the actors, who had to walk more slowly than normal to appear in scale with the houses. There are a number of reasons for the use of an indoor studio, the main one being that the infancy of production techniques at the time did not allow easy recording and editing of sequences filmed in different locations. It was not until 1967 that editing techniques had improved enough to allow Coronation Street to be filmed on separate interior and exterior sets.

The studios were not big enough for the entire street to be erected at once, so it was split into two halves. The pavements and cobbled street were painted onto the studio floor. Despite the limitations of the cramped studio set, some complex and dramatic scenes were filmed there. These include the collapse of number 7 in 1965, and two years later, a special effects-laden storyline involving a train crash; the viewers did not know if stalwart Ena Sharples was dead under the rubble.

In 1967, Granada Television made the decision to build an outside set. This new set was built on some old railway sidings near Granada Studios, and coincided with a storyline of the demolition of Elliston's raincoat factory and the Mission Hall, and the subsequent building of maisonettes opposite the terrace.

Coronation Street's 1968 set was initially not all that different from the interior version previously used, with the wooden facades that had been used in the studio simply being erected on the new site. The only real change seen on screen was natural light illuminating the street for the first time. In late 1969 the street was constructed in brick, with roofs and back yards added later. The set was still reduced in scale and quite cramped and even though the pavements and cobbled street were now real, the cobbles were not parallel to the houses, and ran diagonally down the street. The first exterior set was referred to as "the coldest place on earth" by actors and crew since they disliked working on it due to a near-constant wind which blew directly down the street. Filming on the new exterior set was kept to a minimum, not only because the actors disliked the set, but because of the higher cost of using film for exterior sequences.

The site later became the New York Street at the now-closed Granada Studios Tour complex. The site of New York Street set has been used again in Coronation Street, notably for Davenports (the firm Sally Webster worked for when she embarked on an affair with her boss, Ian Davenport); the strip club where Lloyd Mullaney met Cheryl Gray and also as the location for Weatherfield's tram stop where Izzy Armstrong was mugged in 2011. In 2012, the site featured as the location of a casino and another strip club in which the character Kylie Platt (née Granger) was working.

== 1982–2013 ==
In 1982 an almost full-size exterior street was built in the Granada backlot, with the cobbles running in the correct direction. The new set was opened by Queen Elizabeth II in 1982. The properties were constructed to a scale of 7/10; the new backlot at MediaCity UK is constructed to 9/10.

=== Production areas in the Granada Studios backlot ===
==== Prop vehicle parking ====
Parking for the prop vehicles was located where you would expect the western end of Crimea Street to be. This was where most vehicles were seen to be heading when leaving the street via Viaduct Street, however those that left via Victoria Street were, in reality, heading to a dead-end, where the Granada bonded warehouse was.

==== Stage One ====
Featured the interior sets for the Rovers Return and No. 1 Coronation Street, among others. The Rovers Return was permanently erected due to the set's constant use. During Coronation Street: The Tour, visitors saw inside the Rovers Return as well as Carla Connor's former apartment, Numbers 8 and 9 Coronation Street and also Underworld. The barge owned by Martha, who had an affair with Ken Barlow in 2009 was also a set for tourists to see during their Coronation Street visit. In March 2015 the studio tour was updated to include The Kabin.

==== Stage Two ====
Once featured the interior set of No. 13 Coronation Street among others. The entrance to Stage Two was between some flats on Victoria Street and Victoria Court.

==== Exterior set ====
Since it was intended to be permanent, the houses were constructed from reclaimed Salford brick and roof slates to give an authentic look. The buildings were not complete, most lacking interior walls. The chimneys were made of fibreglass since there was insufficient support for brick ones. The building interiors were used as offices for writers and as stores for props used in outdoor shooting, aside from the takeaway, butcher shop and Barlow's Buys, which were built so that filming could take place inside them.

In the following years, staircases were added inside the doors of the houses. A number of Granada tower blocks dominated the skyline around the set. These were usually obscured through careful camera angles.

The door next to Audrey's salon led to a flat above the salon itself, which was used as the supporting artistes' green room and consisted of two simple rooms, one with chairs and a sink/wash area for extras, and the other used as a costume change area.

A photo of the Coronation Street set and production base used since 2013 at MediaCityUK centre in 2020.

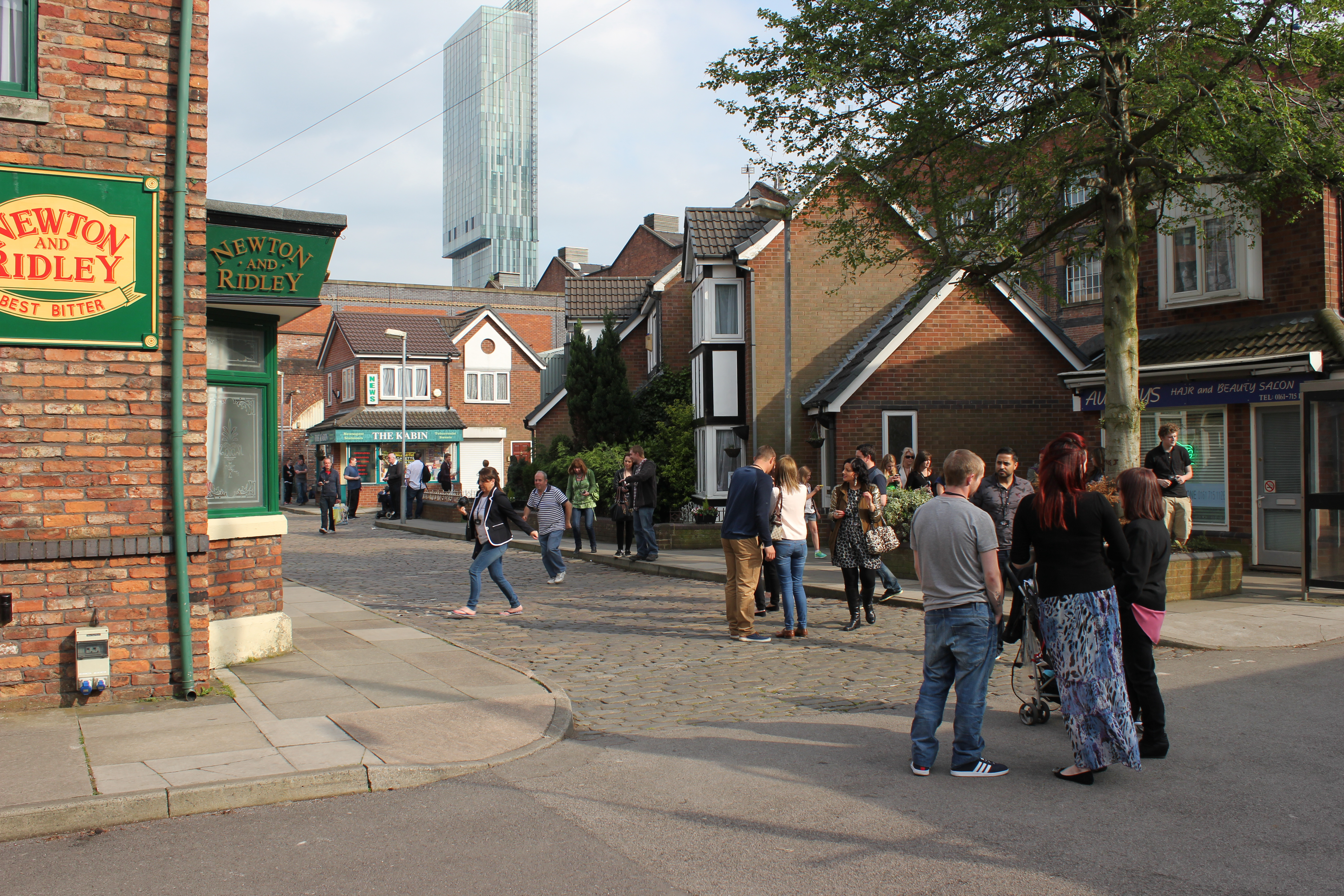
The Beetham Tower in the background was illustrative of the rapidly changing environment.

Towards the end of the 1980s, scenes filmed on the exterior set became more numerous after the show's location work switched from film to videotape in 1988, although some outdoor video shooting, using large, tethered cameras, had been trialled as early as 1977. More trials were conducted with a PSC (portable single camera) unit for the Rovers Return fire episode in 1986.

In 1989, larger development of the Coronation Street set took place. The factory and community centre which had been part of the street since 1971 were demolished. Three new houses, two shop units, a garage and a factory were built on the site. These developments were the idea of new executive producer David Liddiment. The tour was closed on Mondays, as this was the day that the set was used for filming at the time.

When the Granada Studios Tour was closed in 1999 the exterior set was extended and updated. The derelict Graffiti Club on Rosamund Street was revamped and reopened as a medical centre. A new road, Victoria Street, was built to house three shops and two houses. A builders' yard backing onto the betting shop was built. To obscure one of the Granada Television buildings, a new viaduct was built on Rosamund Street. This sat behind the Rovers and parallel to Coronation Street and introduced an anomaly, as it did not appear in the opening titles aerial shots of Coronation Street. The "viaduct" was actually a façade with an optical illusion to make it look complete. A backdrop of some Salford streets was erected in 2005 allowing shots to be filmed looking up Rosamund Street and creating the illusion of other dwellings further along that street.

At the end of Coronation Street there is a fictitious tram line which has seen CGI trams used over it in the past (notably the opening titles and when Kelly Crabtree left the long-running drama). The storyline for December 2010 (Coronation Street's 50th anniversary) showed the viaduct collapse, sending the tram onto the cobbles, demolishing the Kabin and the corner shop in the process.

Whilst the majority of the interior scenes were filmed within Stages One and Two (the scale of the houses meant it unfeasible to set up filming within the exterior backlot) Elliott's Butchers, Barlow's Buys, Prima Doner and Webster's Autos all allowed for interior/exterior filming. At one time Barlow's Buys was previously a bookmakers; before 2000 this was merely a façade to hide the Granada Studios Tours and the bookmakers set was interior only.

On 20 December 2013, the final scenes were filmed at Quay Street, and the set re-opened on 5 April 2014, when it became a tourist attraction.

Planning permission was submitted in 2015 to demolish this set: demolition took place in 2017.

== ITV Trafford Wharf set (2013–) ==
In March 2009, it was announced that Coronation Street would stay on the then-current Quay Street site "for the foreseeable future". Following a change of hands at ITV management, talks between ITV and The Peel Group for the move to the Trafford Park site reopened in January 2010. In December 2010, it was announced that the proposed move was now to take place.

Construction began in September 2011 after the area next to the Imperial War Museum North was surveyed for any possible World War II bomb threats, the studios were constructed by Mace (the actual set by Askam Construction) and building was completed in 2013. The set is built to a greater scale than the Granada Studios set and there are several changes to the structure of the street and the surrounding areas.

On 29 November 2013, the new set was officially unveiled. At the press launch ITV announced that an hour-long documentary entitled Coronation Street – A Moving Story will air which will accompany the show's set move to MediaCityUK. Filmed over two years, the programme reveals how the new production base was planned and built. The documentary also features interviews from cast and crew members. Coronation Street – A Moving Story aired on 6 March 2014 on ITV. On 9 March 2014 ITV announced that the opening title sequence had been updated slightly. The new titles now feature the updated exteriors to; The Rovers Return Inn, D&S Alahan's corner shop, and Nick's Bistro, interior scenes have been screened and exterior scenes at the new set first aired on 10 March 2014. Despite the houses being built to be a more realistic scale, filming is still completely studio based for the majority of interior scenes. The interior sets for Prestons Petals, the Prima Doner kebab shop and the community centre are also filmed within the actual building like the previous set. The Underworld factory and Street Cars join them and can be filmed within the exterior. The Underworld factory was previously filmed within its building on the backlot at Granada Studios. Furthermore, for the first time in the show's history, The Rovers Return has a partial interior to allow camera shots looking into the exit to the rear yard and smoking area.

On 25 August 2014, viewers saw Tyrone Dobbs' bedroom at Number 9 for the first time. Previous to this one interior bedroom set was used for the entire street. For the stunt which saw Tyrone fall through the ceiling from the attic (after Todd Grimshaw ordered 12mm chipboard instead of 14mm and blackmailed Gary Windass to use it, therefore failing to meet building regulations) the interior set was constructed over a period of four weeks and housed inside the empty shell of Roy's Rolls. A behind the scenes video was uploaded after the first installment of the bank holiday episodes aired to the website of Coronation Street.

On 12 March 2018 the new expansion of the Victoria Street set was unveiled. The extended set features a garden, and a memorial bench paying tribute to the Manchester Arena bombing 22 victims, including Coronation Street super fan Martyn Hett. New additions to the set include a precinct with facades of a Greater Manchester Police station, a tram stop named Weatherfield North which is part of a product placement deal with Metrolink, and shopfront facades of Costa Coffee and a Weatherfield-branded Co-op Food supermarket which appeared onscreen from 20 April 2018.

On 20 April 2018, ITV announced that it had successfully been granted planning permission to allow booked public visits to the MediaCityUK Trafford Wharf set. Tours commenced on weekends from 26 May 2018.

On 8 March 2022, ITV announced that a further new exterior set extension will include a 7.7-acre site in Trafford. Weatherfield Precinct the set designed by production designer Rosie Mullins-Hoyle will be based on 1960s architecture which will include new local shops, a piazza, maisonettes, balconies and a staircase which will be completed in six months time.

== Interior filming and sets ==
The majority of interior scenes at the old Granada Studios were shot in the adjoining purpose-built studio, Stage One. The Stage One soundstage was constructed in 1990 next to the exterior set and it was the first time that the actors were given their own dressing rooms. The interior sets were also moved into Stage One, with the Rovers, café and shops being erected permanently. The interior sets for the houses were constructed as required. The Stage One complex included make-up and costume areas, and a green room.

The development of Stage One was as a result of the policy of then-producers David Liddiment and Mervyn Watson to update the show's production techniques. The changes they introduced were still used as of 2010, although the schedules are much tighter due to the higher number of episodes now produced. This leaves almost no time for rehearsal or blocking and most scenes are shot very quickly. The resultant need for additional studio capacity meant the opening of Stage Two, located next to The Bonded Warehouse on the Granada site in what used to be the Baker Street building.

In an episode of Coronation Street in 2010 an editing error meant viewers could see "outside" via the kitchen window of no. 5 (Fiz and John Stapes' house) showing what would be a "supporting" wall (quite possibly the painted brick wall backdrop) leaning against the studio walls. In another episode where Graham Proctor announced his relationship with Tina McIntyre's ex, David Platt, a brief shot of the Platts' kitchen showed no ceiling above it. It is not the first time such errors have occurred: in one episode where Alan Bradley attacked Rita Fairclough, viewers could see a studio light in what should be No. 7's back yard.

Furthermore, the layouts of the interior sets would be unfeasible in the exterior sets. For example, the two windows by the fireplace in the pub's interior set don't exist on the outdoor set; the stairs to the living quarters of the Rovers have changed from right to left to left to right, the toilets would be in Ken Barlow's house and the back room would be in the middle of Rosamund Street.

Whilst filming takes place on the interior sets, any actors appearing to walk outside (i.e. back onto the street from The Kabin) have to stand around and remain quiet until filming has finished. This fact was revealed in the 15 May issue of TVTimes magazine.

Whereas The Rovers Return was previously an empty shell on the backlot at Granada Studios a partial interior has been constructed within the new pub at the drama serial's new home over at Trafford Wharf. This was shown on screen by actor Simon Gregson (who plays Steve McDonald) during the ITV programme "Coronation Street: A Moving Story", documenting the two-year process of constructing the new set build.

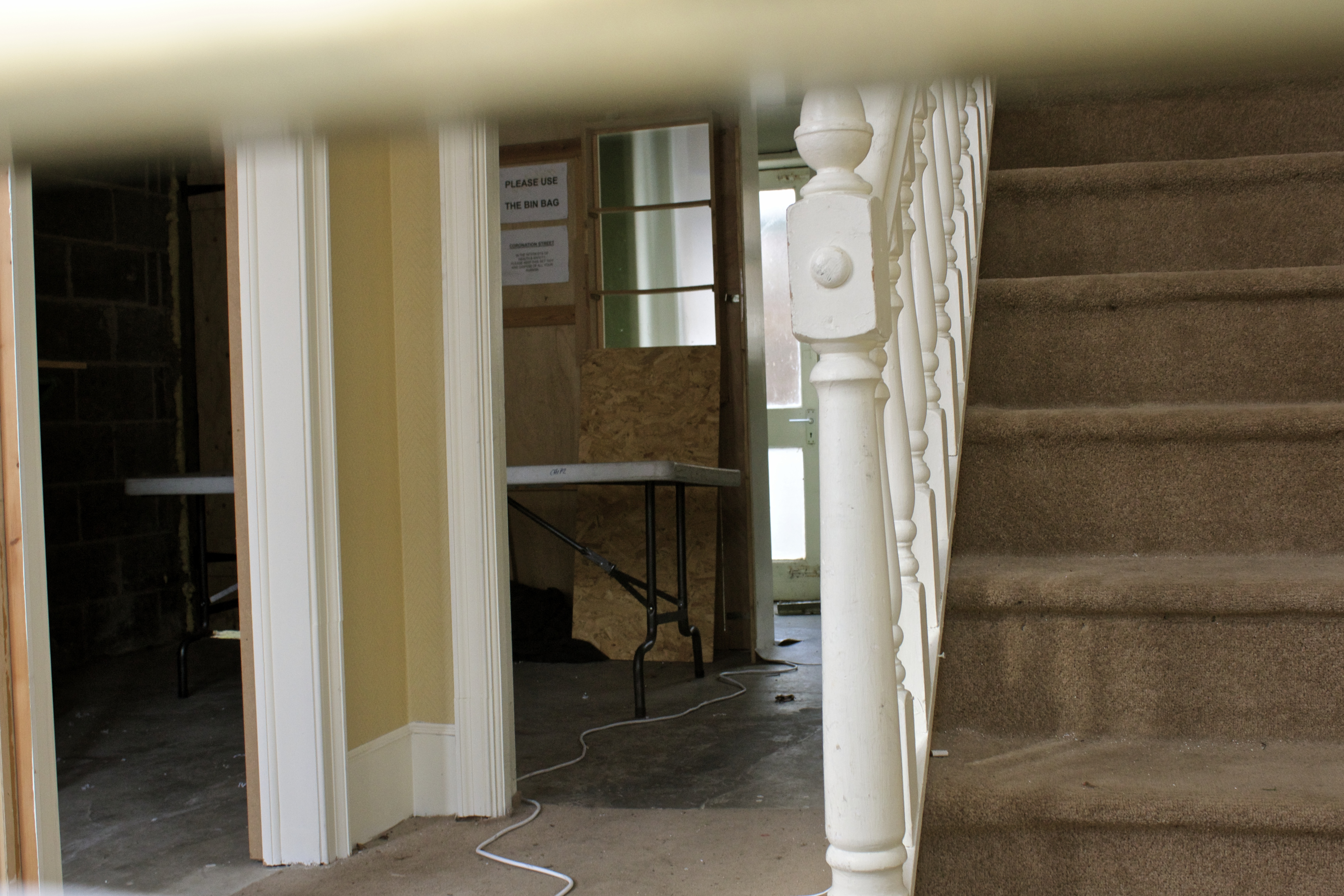
Number One Coronation Street

== Architecture of Coronation Street ==
The architecture of Coronation Street was based on Archie Street, Ordsall, an area of Salford which has long been demolished. Archie Street appeared in the programme's original opening credits.

There is an Archie Street in Salford today, but not on the site of the original – which stood near St Clement's Church, Ordsall. The original Archie Street was part of Ordsall and now part of Salford Quays is on the site. There is, however, a 15-metre stretch of the street's cobbles still there and there is even a street sign just off Trafford Road.

The original Archie Street is pictured on the Real 1970s website. The picture shows the street shortly before it was demolished in 1971. The site includes a picture of an adjacent church which still stands as of 2010.

== Weatherfield life – the changing face of Coronation Street ==
According to the show's backstory the fictional Coronation Street was built in 1902, and named after the coronation of King Edward VII. The row of terraced houses is the only part of the street to remain relatively unaltered since 1902. The only real structural change to the terrace was in 1965 when number 7 collapsed due to old mine-workings under it. After the collapse the site remained vacant, with a park bench placed in the gap between numbers 5 and 9. A new house was constructed on the site in 1982.

The other side of the street has been the site of several different building developments. The original Hardcastle's Mill building constructed in 1882 was the location of Elliston's raincoat factory in the series. The building was demolished in 1968 along with the Glad Tidings Mission Hall, to make way for new maisonette houses. This three-storey building comprised four three-bedroom duplexes, accessed from ground level, and three OAP ground floor-flats. The maisonettes were demolished in 1971 after a structural fault was identified following a fire and were replaced by the Mark Brittain warehouse and a new community centre. 1989 saw a radical redevelopment of Coronation Street when the factory and community centre were demolished and replaced by three new houses, two shop units, a garage and a factory. They all stood until 2010, when a derailed tram crashed through both D&S Alahan's and The Kabin. After the tram crash, they were rebuilt to be roughly the same as they were before and remain standing to this day.

== Bibliography ==
- Tinker, Jack (1987). Coronation Street; A fully illustrated record of television's most popular serial. Treasure Press. ISBN 1-85051-229-9.
- Podmore, Bill (1990). Coronation Street; The Inside Story. MacDonald. ISBN 0-356-17971-0.
- Little, Daran (2000). 40 Years of Coronation Street. Granada Media. ISBN 0-233-99806-3.
