= Tigervision =

American video game company

Tigervision was a subsidiary of Tiger Toys which produced video games for the Atari 2600, Atari 8-bit computers, TI-99/4A, VIC-20, and Commodore 64. Most of their games were ports. Polaris and River Patrol were originally arcade games from Taito and Orca, respectively. Marauder, Threshold, and Jawbreaker were originally computer games from Sierra On-Line. Miner 2049er was first published for the Atari 8-bit computers by Big Five Software. While the Atari 8-bit version contains ten levels, it was split into two cartridges for the 2600, each sold as a separate game containing three levels.

== Games ==
The following games were released for the Atari 2600:

- Espial
- Jawbreaker
- King Kong
- Marauder
- Miner 2049er
- Miner 2049er Volume II
- Polaris
- River Patrol
- Springer
- Threshold

=== Unreleased ===
- Changes
- Intuition
- Matterhorn
- Scraper Caper
- Sky Lancer
- Super Crush
