= Thorn EMI =

British company, 1979–1996

Thorn EMI plc
- Formerly: Thorn EMI Limited (1979–1981)
- Type: Public
- Industry: Music, video, defence equipment
- Predecessors: Thorn Electrical Industries; EMI
- Founded: 1979; 47 years ago
- Defunct: 1996; 30 years ago
- Fate: Demerged and subsequently broken up
- Successors: Thorn plc EMI
- Headquarters: London, England
- Key people: Sir Richard Cave, Founding chairman; Sir John Reid, Founding chief executive; Sir Colin Southgate, Final executive chairman

Thorn EMI plc was a major British company involved in consumer electronics, music, defence and retail. Created when Thorn Electrical Industries merged with EMI in October 1979, it was listed on the London Stock Exchange and was once a constituent of the FTSE 100 Index. It demerged back to separate companies in 1996.

== History ==
The company was formed following the board of EMI accepting a £169 million offer from Thorn Electrical Industries in November 1979 to merge the groups. Thorn saw EMI as a good fit for the music and future home video market with Thorn manufacturing hardware and EMI providing content. EMI chief executive Bernard Delfont, chairman Sir John Read and Capitol Records' chief Bhaskar Menon joined the Thorn EMI board, with Read becoming deputy chairman of Thorn EMI. Thorn's chairman Sir Richard Cave became chairman of the merged group.

Soon after the merger, Thorn EMI divested many of the group's leisure operations. In July 1980, seven hotels, including the Tower Hotel, London and Royal Horseguards Hotel, and 12 Angus Steakhouse restaurants were sold for £23 million to Scottish & Newcastle Breweries. In November the same year, most of the group's other leisure interests including Blackpool Tower, amusement parks, sport centres, piers, restaurants, pubs, four theatres, including the Prince Edward Theatre, and the Empire Ballroom and Cinema in Leicester Square in London were sold to Trust House Forte for £16 million. Lord Delfont became chairman and chief executive of THF's leisure division.

In May 1984, the Company attempted to merge with British Aerospace and, in July 1984, it bought the micro-chip manufacturer, INMOS.

In April 1986, Thorn EMI sold its film and video operations to businessman Alan Bond.

Thorn EMI acquired the Mullard Equipment Limited ('MEL') division of Philips in 1990.

Further divestment of operations took place during the 1990s. In 1991, its consulting, systems integration, and outsourcing service division – Thorn EMI Software, was a subject of a management buyout. In 1993, Thames Television was sold. In 1994, following a leveraged management buy-out, Thorn Lighting Ltd floated on the London Stock Exchange as TLG plc (the Thorn Lighting Group) and in 1995, the various defence businesses were sold.

On 16 August, 1996, Thorn EMI shareholders voted in favour of demerging Thorn from EMI again: the Company became EMI Group plc, and the electronics and rentals divisions were divested as Thorn plc.

== Operations ==
Thorn EMI's wide range of business covered the following principal areas of activity; retail/rentals, electronics, defence, software, music, television broadcasting, lighting and film and cinema.

=== Retail and rental ===
Thorn Television Rentals (TTR) comprised two companies on merger, Radio Rentals and DER (Domestic Electric Rentals Ltd). The EMI group also included the HMV stores. Radio Rentals was acquired in 1968 for £155 million to form the largest television rental group in Great Britain with 1,300 rental stores and 2.6 million subscribers.

In 1987, Thorn EMI acquired Rent-A-Center in the United States for $594 million which had 469 stores on acquisition.

In 1989, Rumbelows was acquired by Radio Rentals and all Rumbelows' rental accounts were transferred to Radio Rentals, bolstering its market position. With its core business removed, Rumbelows sought a new identity as a more conventional (non-rental) retailer, even adding computers to the product mix.

In 1992, Thorn converted some of the remaining Rumbelows shops into DER, Multibroadcast or Radio Rentals branches. Some stores were also converted to the Fona brand.

By the 1990s, Rumbelows was making losses and Thorn closed the remaining 285 Rumbelows shops and 36 Fona stores in 1995.

In 1995, Thorn EMI bought Dillons the Bookstore from Pentos and immediately closed 40 of the 140 Dillons bookstore locations. Of the remaining 100 stores, most kept the name Dillons, while the remainder were Hatchards and Hodges Figgis.

=== Music ===
The EMI label expanded greatly as part of Thorn EMI. In 1989, Thorn EMI bought a 50% interest in Chrysalis Records, buying the outstanding 50% in 1991. In one of its highest-profile and most expensive acquisitions, Thorn EMI took over Richard Branson's Virgin Records in 1992 for £510 million.

=== Television broadcasting ===
Thorn EMI was the majority shareholder in the London-based ITV broadcaster Thames Television until a share flotation in 1984.

In 1984, Thorn EMI and others launched Music Box, Premiere and The Children's Channel via satellite television.

In 1985, the company attempted to sell their stake in Thames to Carlton Communications but this was blocked by the governing body of ITV, the Independent Broadcasting Authority.

In February 1986, Thorn EMI's 50% stake in Music Box owner, The Music Channel, was sold to fellow shareholder, Virgin Group, for £600,000.

Thames Television was acquired by Pearson Television in mid-1993.

=== Lighting ===
In 1987, the purchase of the Jarnkonst group of Nordic light fitting companies by Thorn Lighting and closure of the Buckie lamp factory signalled a new drive by parent Thorn EMI to trade an export and 'colonies' mentality for a multi-cultural, international outlook, one that took account of the forthcoming Single European Act. Gaining critical mass in lighting fixtures – defined as 10% market share in any one county – was identified as a priority.

In 1988, Thorn EMI bought the French group Holophane to gain access to its luminaire subsidiary, Europhane.

In November 1990, Thorn EMI announced that it had agreed to sell its principal light source interests to GE Lighting. Under the agreement, GE acquired the lamp plants at Enfield, Leicester and Wimbledon, as well as Thorn's 51% in SIVI Illuminazione in Italy and 100% holding in Gluhlampenfabrik Jahn. Thorn EMI subsequently closed its Merthyr Tydfil lamp factory, consolidated its UK distribution centres and sold its South African business.

In 1994, following a leveraged management buy-out, Thorn Lighting Ltd floated on the London Stock Exchange as TLG plc (the Thorn Lighting Group).

=== Defence ===
From its formation until the mid-1990s, Thorn EMI was one of the United Kingdom's largest defence companies.

The MEL Division, acquired from Philips, was involved in radar, electronic warfare, and communications. The MEL communications business was sold to Thomson-CSF, now Thales.

In 1995, the various defence businesses were sold:

- Thorn EMI Electro Optics to Pilkington Optronics
- Thomson Thorn Missile Electronics to Thomson-CSF, now Thales
- Thorn Sensors Group to Racal (to become Racal-Thorn Wells, now also part of Thales)
- Thorn Microwave Devices (Microwave tubes and transmitters) was acquired by its management in an MBO, becoming TMD Technologies Ltd (acquired by CPI in 2021 and now part of CPI-EDB owned by Transdigm Inc).
- Thorn Electron Tubes also acquired by its management becoming Electron Tubes Ltd.

=== Machine tools ===
In the early 1980s, Thorn EMI Machine Tools manufactured computerised numerical controlled (CNC) machine tools at its EMI-MEC Limited factory in Chandlers Ford, Eastleigh, Hampshire.

=== Computer software ===
==== Home software ====
In the early to mid-1980s, Thorn EMI Video Programmes released a number of games for several home computer formats, initially under their own name. These included Computer War, Submarine Commander, Tank Commander, Snooker and Billiards, 8-Ball and Tournament Pool, Darts, Cribbage and Dominoes (1981), Gold Rush, Mutant Herd, Road Racer, Volcanic Planet (1983), and River Rescue (1982). They received a lukewarm reception with no major hits, although Snooker and Billiards did reach No. 6 in the UK Atari Charts.

From 1981 until about 1983, Thorn EMI Video Programmes was based in the Thorn EMI head office, Orion House on Upper St Martin's Lane, near Seven Dials in central London before later moving to an office in Soho.

The label was renamed Creative Sparks in 1984 and sold in a management buyout in 1985 before going into receivership and disappearing in 1987.

==== Business software and services ====
In 1991, Thorn EMI's consulting, systems integration, and outsourcing service division– Thorn EMI Software- was a subject of a management buyout and started to trade as a separate company named "Data Sciences Ltd". The staff and management paid £82 million for the £117 million turnover division.

In 1996, IBM acquired Data Sciences plc for £95 million.

=== Fire and security systems ===
Thorn Security installed and serviced all types of electronic security systems from their bases around the UK, inheriting EMI's well-known AFA-Minerva lineage. The business was absorbed into ADT, soon after the EMI demerger, and; all but a handful of the famous red 'Thorn' bellboxes were replaced, mostly by ADT's hexagonal bellboxes, which were inherited by ADT's prior takeover of Modern Alarms. However, the fire products are still present in many premises, and until recently (as of 2007) spares and complete systems of Thorn heritage continued to be manufactured by ADT. Most of Thorn's bells and sounders were rebadged Friedland, Fulleon Cooper, or Hosiden Besson products, with most of the bells made during the EMI era being based on the Friedland Master Bell (Big Bell for 8" models).

=== Business Communications ===
This division, based in Marlow, provided hotels with televisions and related equipment. It also embarked upon a project called Hotel 3000, which provided interactive set-top boxes for hotel rooms in the late 1980s.

After Thorn's demerger, this division started operating as Quadriga

=== Advanced Product Development Centre ===
This small subsidiary further developed existing products, as well as introducing new ones. It was based in St Lawrence House, Broad Street, Bristol.

=== Consumer electronics ===
==== Ferguson ====
Ferguson Radio Corporation was owned by Thorn Electical Industries then subsequently by Thorn EMI until its sale to Thomson in 1987. It made consumer electronics, such as TV sets and radios. TVs were designed and manufactured by Ferguson in the UK until around the early 1990s, although, before this, some Thomson-designed models were introduced to the Ferguson range of TVs for sale in the UK. Some of these Thomson-based models were even manufactured in the UK, although, in later years, these models were made outside the UK by Thomson.

By 1992, the Ferguson TV factory in Gosport had closed, ending a long period of manufacturing of Ferguson TVs in the UK.

VCRs were sourced until the early 1990s by a joint company called J2T, established by JVC, Thorn (Ferguson), and Telefunken. From around 1991, VCRs were sourced from Thomson alone.

One important aspect of Thorn EMI's business was its ability to manufacture one of its Ferguson televisions, and then make it available for rental through its rentals sector, or sell it through its retail sector.

==== Other consumer electronics subsidiaries ====
Prism Micro Products was owned by Thorn EMI for a short period in the 1980s.

The group was in partnership with Ericsson in the UK telecommunications company Thorn Ericsson but sold its 51% stake to Ericsson in 1988.

Kenwood Limited sold small appliances and is now owned by DeLonghi.

=== Thorn EMI's film and video interests ===
Following the merger, EMI's film division was renamed Thorn EMI Screen Entertainment. The newly merged company continued the film interests EMI had acquired over the preceding decade; these had included the former Associated British Picture Corporation, and their facilities at Elstree Studios, Shenley Road, Borehamwood and ABC Cinemas.

Thorn EMI Video was established in 1981. Thorn EMI released films on video from various film companies including Orion Pictures (First Blood, The Terminator), New Line Cinema (The Evil Dead, Xtro), and Universal (Bad Boys, Frances) in the 1980s. (The Thorn EMI Video label was also used for their early home software releases).

Thorn EMI joined HBO in November 1984 to create Thorn EMI/HBO Video.

In April 1986, Thorn EMI sold Thorn EMI Screen Entertainment and the film library, Thorn EMI Video, and ABC Cinemas to businessman Alan Bond. Bond, in turn, sold it to The Cannon Group a week later. HBO maintained an involvement the video company, which became HBO/Cannon Video. Cannon left operations and the company was eventually called HBO Video in 1987.

=== Leisure ===
Many of EMI's leisure interest were sold the year after the merger but EMI Social Centres chain of bingo halls remained with Thorn EMI.

In 1983, the Winter Gardens in Blackpool were sold to First Leisure.

== After demerger ==
- Thorn was purchased by Nomura Principal Finance Group in 1998, which subsequently became Terra Firma Capital Partners (who also owned EMI for a period). It disposed of Thorn in 2007 to a private buyer.
- EMI announced in November 2011 that it would sell its music arm to Vivendi's Universal Music Group and its publishing business to a Sony/ATV consortium.
