= Colin Southgate =

English businessman (1938–2021)

Sir Colin Southgate
- Born: Colin Grieve Southgate; 24 July 1938; New Malden, Surrey, England
- Died: 26 July 2021 (aged 83)
- Education: City of London School
- Occupation: Businessman
- Spouse: Sally Mead (m. 1962)
- Children: 4

Sir Colin Southgate (24 July 1938 – 26 July 2021) was an English businessman. He was chief executive of Thorn EMI and chairman of the Royal Opera House.

== Early life ==
Colin Grieve Southgate was born in New Malden, Surrey on 24 July 1938. He was the only child of Cyril, a fruit merchant in the old Covent Garden market, and Edith. Upon the outbreak of World War II, Edith took Southgate and his elder sister Jean to Northampton. After the war he attended primary school in Kingston upon Thames, and his family relocated to Epsom when he was a teenager. He won a place at the public City of London School, making the journey there by train.

== Career ==
Southgate trained as an actuary at National Provident Institution, in a period he later described as the worst two and a half years of his life. He left for the computer industry on the advice of a friend, and worked at International Computers and Tabulators customising company software packages. He stayed at the company for ten years.

In 1970 Southgate and his father-in-law founded Software Sciences, which they sold to BOC and Thorn EMI. Southgate joined the latter as head of business and security systems in 1983, after taking an 18-month break. In 1984 he joined its board. He was appointed chief executive of Thorn EMI in 1987 and became its chairman two years later. He was on the Bank of England's Court of Directors, a trustee of the National Gallery, and chaired PowerGen.

He was knighted in 1992.

In 1997 he became a non-executive director at the executive search company Whitehead Mann Group.

In 1998 Southgate was chosen by Prime Minister Tony Blair to chair the Royal Opera House. In a press conference in the role he said, "I don't want to sit next to somebody with a singlet, smelly shorts and a pair of trainers when I go to the opera". The first year was a testing one, as his roles at EMI and the Opera House overlapped for eighteen months. Nevertheless, he solved the management issues at the Opera House, sorted out the finances, and completed the renovations with a gala attended by the Queen and Tony Blair. He stood down from the Opera House in 2003 and became chairman of Whitehead Mann Group, before retiring in 2006.

== Personal life ==
Southgate married Sally Mead in 1962, whom he met through his work at International Computers and Tabulators. The couple had two sons and two daughters, and lived in Berkshire, the south of France, and Tuscany.

Southgate died of a heart attack on 26 July 2021.
