= Skytrak =

Former roller coaster

- Skytrak in operation

Granada Studios Tour
- Location: Granada Studios Tour
- Coordinates: 53.478128°N 2.257115°W
- Status: Removed
- Opening date: October 1997
- Closing date: 1998

General statistics
- Type: Steel – Flying
- Manufacturer: Skytrak International
- Height: 50 ft (15 m)
- Length: 1,282 ft (391 m)
- Speed: 28 mph (45 km/h)
- Capacity: 240 riders per hour
- G-force: 2.5
- Height restriction: 55 in (140 cm)
- Skytrak at RCDB

Skytrak was a flying roller coaster located at Granada Studios Tour amusement park in Castlefield, Manchester, England. Opened in October 1997, it was the first flying roller coaster in the world, in which riders were tilted forward to experience the sensation of flying. It was named after an event from the Gladiators television series, and was the only roller coaster constructed by Skytrak International, a subsidiary of Fairport Engineering.

The ride was a "solo coaster" having only one person per car, which along with a complicated boarding process limited capacity to between 200 and 240 riders per hour. Issues with the ride delayed its opening by several months, and it continued to suffer reliability issues. It closed in 1998, with the park closing soon after. The ride was eventually removed and scrapped.
