= Red Heart =

Red Heart was a production company that operated as a joint venture between the Seven Network and Granada PLC between c. 1999 and 2001. The media company brought together all of its Australian parents' TV production resources, except those used for Seven's news and soaps.

Australia's Broadcasting Services Act 1992 disallows foreign entities owning more than 15% of any TV station licence holder, but owning a company that provides a station with 100% of its content for 99% of its income is fine. (CanWest found another way around the law to own a majority stake of Network Ten).

Steve Vizard was chairman of Granada Media Australia and of Red Heart, after 1998.

In 2001, Granada reduced its involvement in Red Heart and established Granada Australia as a separate production company. Following his position as leader fo Red Heart, Paul Jackson led the new operation. Seven projects continued to develop Red Heart, while Granada Australia pursued opportunities to produce programes for other broadcasters.
