= Big Brown Box =

- Industry: Retail
- Founded: November 2008; 16 years ago
- Defunct: 2015
- Fate: Merged into Appliances Online
- Headquarters: Sydney, Australia
- Parent: Thorn Group Limited (2008–2011); Appliances Online (2011–2015)
- Website: BigBrownBox.com.au

Big Brown Box was an online retailer of audio visual products, based in Sydney.

== History ==
An online retail site trading as Big Brown Box was launched by Thorn Group Limited (owners of brands including Radio Rentals and Rentlo) in November 2008. It offered whitegoods, small appliances, and electronic products.

The site allowed customers to order goods online with Radio Rentals stores facilitating delivery and service of the goods.

At the time, company leaders were confident of its success in the competitive online market, but made it clear they were not pursuing a discounting war strategy, and would take a "sensible and easy approach".

In the same report, Thorn Group managing director, John Hughes, was quoted as saying: "Big Brown Box is really starting to gain some momentum and it is great to see a good steady increase in sales together with very positive customer feedback, particularly from those people in regional areas."Big Brown Box's eBay store was launched in July 2010.

In November 2010, the Thorn Group announced it would exit the online venture BigBrownBox.com.au in early 2011 due to difficult trading conditions and the poor state of the retail market.

A statement on the Australian Securities Exchange said the group expected minimal impact on profitability for FY11 and there was potential for far better returns from an alternative investment.

John Hughes told Retailbiz the move was in the best interest of shareholders.

The strength of the Australian Dollar, leading to price deflation, aggressive price competition and softening consumer demand were also identified as reasons for the closure. The move was completed by March 2011.

John Winning, CEO of white goods retailer Appliances Online, purchased the digital asset for Big Brown Box.

Big Brown Box was part of the National Associated Retail Traders of Australia (NARTA) group.

In 2015 owing to the significant customer crossover between the Appliances Online and Big Brown Box businesses the two businesses were merged, and Big Brown Box redirecting to Appliances Online's site.

== Awards ==
- Power Retail award for Best Site Design, Online Retailer Industry Awards 2010.
