= River Rescue =

1982 video game

- Developer: Aackosoft
- Publisher: Thorn EMI Computer Software
- Designer: Jeremy Smith
- Programmers: VIC-20; Will Kemp; Atari 8-bit Kevin Buckner; ZX Spectrum; Phil Snell
- Platforms: VIC-20, Atari 8-bit, ZX Spectrum, Commodore 64
- Release: 1982: VIC-20; 1983: Atari 8-bit, Spectrum; 1984: C64
- Genre: Action
- Mode: Up to 2 players

River Rescue is an action game for the VIC-20 published by Thorn EMI Computer Software in 1982. It was designed by Jeremy Smith and programmed by Will Kemp. Ports were released for the Atari 8-bit computers and ZX Spectrum in 1983 and the Commodore 64 in 1984. A TI-99/4A version was advertised but never released.

== Gameplay ==
VIC-20 version

The player guides a boat along a river, which scrolls from right to left across the screen in a top-down view. The boat must avoid colliding with various hazards in the river - these include small islands, crocodiles and logs. The aim is to rescue explorers lost in the jungle.

The boat periodically passes a pair of docks arranged across from each other on either side of the river. If the boat moves to the upper dock, an explorer will run out of the jungle onto the boat. Stopping at the lower dock causes any explorers already on the ship walk back off to safety. Because of the scrolling motion, it is not possible to land at both docks in one go, you must pick up an explorer and then continue along the river until the dock reappears.

Depending on the version and level, between three and five explorers have to be rescued to complete a round. Once the round is complete, the game starts again, faster.

== Reception ==
Alternative Software acquired the rights to the game when Creative Sparks Distribution went into receivership in 1987. Their subsequent budget release of River Rescue reached number 4 in the Gallup Atari 8-bit chart in 1988.

== See also ==
- River Patrol (1981)
