= River Patrol (video game) =

1981 video game

- Developers: Orca Corporation; Tigervision (2600)
- Publishers: Arcade: JP: GGI; NA: Kersten; Tigervision (2600)
- Platforms: Arcade, Atari 2600
- Release: Arcade: JP: July 1981; NA: 1981; 2600: NA: 1984
- Genre: Action
- Modes: Single-player, multiplayer

River Patrol (Japanese: リバーパトロール, Hepburn: Ribā Patorōru) is an action arcade video game developed by Orca Corporation and released by GGI in Japan in 1981. It was licensed to Kersten for distribution in North America. The player pilots a patrol boat along a vertically scrolling river to rescue people from the crocodile-infested waters while avoiding obstacles along the way. Tigervision released an Atari 2600 version in 1984.

== Gameplay ==
A swimmer in trouble is to the left of the patrol boat (arcade).

River Patrol is an action game where players take the role of a captain navigating a river patrol boat across multiple levels to rescue drowning people who fell into the crocodile-infested river for points while avoiding incoming boulders, floating logs and other obstacles that threaten to sink the vessel. The main objective is to reach a dam at the end of each level before the timer runs out and the boat sinks.

Hitting a crocodile or crossing over a whirlpool causes the boat to sink rapidly, however crashing another boat, log, boulder or TNT instantly sinks the player's boat. Once all lives are lost, the game is over unless the player inserts more credits into the arcade machine to continue playing.

== Development and release ==
River Patrol was the second game to be developed by Orca Corporation, a Japanese video game developer headed by Takeshi Tozu, after 1980's Shogun. The game was first released for arcades in Japan by GGI in July 1981 and later in North America by Kersten. An Atari 2600 port, developed by Tigervision, was released in 1984.

== Reception ==
In Japan, River Patrol was the eleventh highest-grossing arcade video game of 1981.

In a retrospective review, Atari Gaming Headquarters' Keita Iida gave the Atari 2600 port a six out of ten score.

== Legacy ==
A bootleg version of the game developed by Falcon titled Silver Land changed the premise to skiing.

The 1981 VIC-20 game River Rescue has strong similarities to River Patrol, but scrolls horizontally. In 1982, Koichi Nakamura programmed a clone of River Patrol for the PC-8001, also titled River Rescue, that was published in the Maikon Game Book 4 special edition of Japanese magazine I/O.

After the release of River Patrol into the market, Orca would go on to work on several projects: The Percussor, The Bounty, Looper, Springer, Funky Bee, Slalom, Sky Lancer, Vastar (published by Sesame Japan Corporation), and Espial, among others. On June 20, 1983, Orca went bankrupt. Former members of the company later worked at Crux before forming Toaplan.

== See also ==
- Swimmer (1982)
