= Mutant Herd =

1983 video game

- Developer: Thorn EMI
- Publisher: Thorn EMI
- Designer: Jeremy Smith
- Programmer: Grahame Hampton-Matthews
- Platform: VIC-20
- Release: 1983
- Genre: Action
- Mode: Multiplayer

Mutant Herd is an action game for the VIC-20 published by Thorn EMI in 1983. It was designed by Jeremy Smith and programmed by Grahame Hampton-Matthews

== Gameplay ==
Mutant Herd involves protecting a powerhouse from a mutant invasion. The mutants crawl towards the player from multiple burrows located at each corner of the screen. Using laser beams, the player must prevent the mutant herds from destroying the powerhouse.

It is possible to enter the burrows and to shut them down. After entering a burrow, another phase of the game begins. A queen mutant and her eggs are hiding in each burrow. The eggs must be destroyed using an explosive charge, while avoiding the queen mutant. After blowing up the eggs, the burrow is sealed and is no longer a threat.

After each burrow is sealed, the player's lasers weaken and the next burrow has more eggs and is more challenging. Victory requires sealing all the burrows.

== Reception ==
COMPUTE! wrote that "There are enough little problems to always keep you thinking about what you'll have to do next". Electronic Games stated that Mutant Herd "may not be the ultimate VIC-20 game, but the graphics are fun, the action is challenging, and it takes at least one step off the beaten game-track". Ahoy! called it "a two-part arcade game with a unique twist", favorably reviewing the graphics, sound, animation, and gameplay.
