= Submarine Commander =

1982 video game

- Publisher: Thorn EMI Computer Software
- Designer: Dean Lock
- Programmers: Atari 8-bit Dean Lock; Apple II; Patrick Buckland; VIC-20; Gary York
- Platforms: Atari 8-bit, VIC-20, Apple II
- Release: 1982: Atari 8-bit 1983: Apple II, VIC-20
- Genre: Submarine simulator
- Mode: Single-player

Submarine Commander is a simulation video game for Atari 8-bit computers written by Dean Lock and published by Thorn EMI Computer Software in 1982. A VIC-20 port by Gary York was released in 1983 and an Apple II version by Patrick Buckland the same year. The Atari version was re-released in 1985 on cassette on the Sparklers budget label. A version for the TI-99/4A was announced but was not released until 1986 when a third party bought the rights.

Submarine Commander simulates the operations of a German U-boat during World War II. The action takes place in the Mediterranean Sea, where the player has to track down a number of allied convoys and then approach them underwater to attack with their torpedoes. Submarine Commander plays in real time: the actions of the player and those of the enemy convoys occur simultaneously.

== Gameplay ==
View from the periscope as the submarine lines up for a shot on a cargo ship.

The game opens displaying the control console, whose square middle section shows a map of the Mediterranean with your current location displayed as a white cross and the locations of enemy ships as black dots. Various status details are shown in the two rectangular areas on either side of the map. Forward movement is controlled by the number keys, 1 for slow and 9 for maximum. On the surface the submarine moves more rapidly and recharges its batteries and air supply. The joystick provides directional control through the rudders and dive planes. This is a slow process, turning the ship around in a 360-degree circle takes considerable time even at full speed.

The main display in the center can be switched between three modes, the map, a sonar display, and the periscope. Typically a mission proceeds by starting on the map display while surfaced, and chasing down one of the convoys. When one is sighted, announced by a bonging sound, the player lowers the submarine to attack depth and continues the approach using the sonar display. Once the range has closed, they raise the periscope and attack the ships with the torpedoes. The periscope shows ships if they are within one mile and the submarine is above 50 feet depth.

There are four types of ships in the convoys; oil tankers, cargo ships, destroyers and patrol boats. All of the ships are armed with at least one gun, and will fire on a surfaced submarine. If the submarine is underwater, the destroyers and patrol boats will attack, while the tankers and cargo ships attempt to flee. Successful attacks cause damage to the ship, which repairs slowly over time. The game ends when the air runs out, the hull reaches damage level 9, there are no torpedoes or fuel left, or all the convoys have been destroyed. The game then assigns a score based on various factors.

The game features nine difficulty levels, which change the number and makeup of the convoys, along with consumables. At the lowest level there are five convoys and the player has 80 torpedoes, 250 fuel and battery that holds a charge of 70. At the highest level, 9, there are 9 convoys, 40 torpedoes, 140 fuel and a battery that can be charged to 30. In levels 7 through 9, more than one torpedo may be needed to sink a ship.

== Reception ==
Electronic Fun gave it a rare 4 out of 4 rating, noting that in spite of the complexity the game was still very fun, and that "Whenever you hit an enemy ship, you want to jump up and cheer."

Hosea Battles reviewed the game for Computer Gaming World, and stated that "This game will appeal to those who like arcade graphics and sounds, but enjoy a sense of wargaming."

Antic awarded it a spot in its 10 best games in 1982 list, calling it "an extremely sophisticated simulation with the added fun of gaming excitement." The Hi-Res review was extremely favourable, saying "There is no question about Submarine Commander. It is the underwater Star Raiders!".

The game was mentioned in a New Scientist article covering Thorn's entry into the videogame market, and a similar article in Billboard.

The Sparklers budget re-release was reviewed in 1986 by Computer Gamer, who gave it a "Red Giant" rating on their star scale. The long-delayed release on the TI-99 gained an A rating.

== Legacy ==
A 1993 Computer Gaming World survey of wargames gave Submarine Commander one star out of five, describing it as "innovative in its time, but now offers next to nothing for the simulation gamer".

A 2009 review noted that "Submarine Commander has brought to the video gaming industry what Eastern Front 1941 done; that is making the computer to be separate medium to those traditional board games. Yet Submarine Commander added an extra flavour of being immersed in 3D which is a dramatic step in contrast to those many, many side-scrolling shoot-em up games." Another reviewer noted it is "one of the most complex games produced for the VIC-20."

=== TI-99/4A version ===
After Thorn announced the TI version, Texas Instruments announced and then rapidly exited the home computer field. Tenex Computer Express of Mishawaka, Indiana obtained the rights to the games in 1986 and released the three games on disk in a single pack. TI reseller Howard Greenberg also sold them in the UK in the same format starting in December 1986.
