= Jules Thorn =

- Born: Julius Thorn; 7 February 1899; Vienna, Austria
- Died: 12 December 1980 (aged 81); London, England
- Occupation: Businessman
- Known for: Founder of Thorn Electrical Industries
- Spouse(s): Dorothy Olive Tanner (m. 1928); Jean Norfolk (m. 1971)
- Children: 2

Sir Jules Thorn (7 February 1899 – 12 December 1980) was the founder of Thorn Electrical Industries, one of the United Kingdom's largest electrical businesses.

== Career ==
Born in Vienna to Jewish parents Leibisch Thorn and Teme Thorn (née Finkelstein), Julius (later known as Jules) Thorn was conscripted into the Austrian Army during World War I. After the War he studied at the Handelshochschule (Business School) in Vienna.

In 1923 Thorn moved to the United Kingdom as representative for Olso, an Austrian manufacturer of gas mantles. In 1926 Olso went bankrupt and Thorn chose to set up business on his own trading as the Electric Lamp Service Company.

In August 1932, Thorn acquired a controlling interest in Chorlton Metal Co. Limited, dealers of electric lamps and radio goods, based in Manchester. In October 1933, Thorn formed Lotus Radio (1933) Limited with Mr L. M. Glancy, a director of Chorlton Metal Co. Limited, acquiring certain assets of the original Lotus Company and to manufacture radio receivers.

By 1936 he merged the companies together, which became one of the largest electrical businesses in the country, Thorn Electrical Industries. He was knighted in 1964.

In 1970 Thorn retired from full-time involvement in the business to devote himself to his racehorses and his collection of Impressionist paintings. He was a successful racehorse owner and won the 2,000 Guineas Stakes at Newmarket with High Top in 1972. Only in 1976 did he retire as chairman of the business.

Thorn died in Westminster, London on 12 December 1980, not long after seeing his company's successful takeover of long-time rival EMI. His work and vision is continued through the Sir Jules Thorn Charitable Trust, chaired by his daughter Ann Rylands, who died in 2009.

== Family ==
In 1928 he married Dorothy Olive Tanner and together they went on to have one son and one daughter. He married a second time, to Jean Norfolk, in 1971.
