= Winning Appliances =

Australian retail company

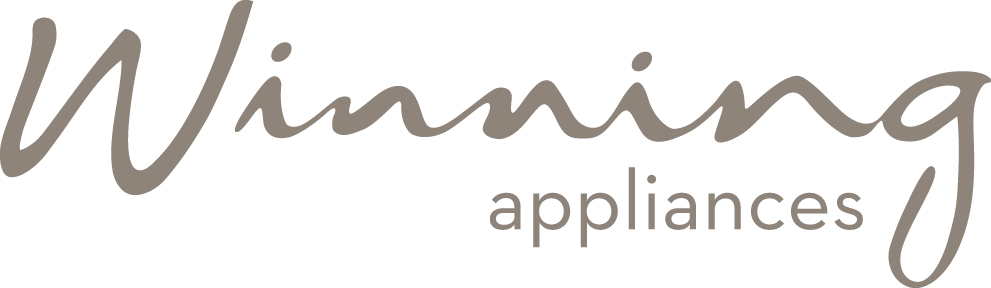
- Type: Privately held company
- Industry: Retail
- Founded: January 1, 1906; 120 years ago
- Founder: Richard William Winning
- Headquarters: Redfern, New South Wales, Australia
- Number of locations: 16 (2026)
- Area served: Australia
- Owner: Winning family
- Website: www.winnings.com.au

Winning Appliances is an Australian-family-owned kitchen and laundry appliance specialist. The company operates showrooms across Australia and sells various kitchen and laundry appliances. Its national headquarters are in Redfern, Sydney.

== History ==
Winning Appliances was founded in 1906 by Richard William Winning. He believed that the carriage, hardware and saddlery trade was a substantial enough industry for him to establish his own business, incorporating R.W. Winning Pty Ltd. The company was initially registered as R.W. Winning & Co., Manufacturers Representative, after securing agency agreements with agencies in England.

In 1911, RW Winning began representing the Barnsley company, a manufacturer of knives and tools for the leather and grinding trade.

Alongside horse and carriage products, R. W. Winning & Co. represented the Pyrex company, which made Corningware, and the Royal Stafford China company. R. W. Winning & Co. sourced international products during World War I and through the 1920s and was able to weather the Great Depression. In the 1930s the company obtained the agency for A Simpson & Son Ltd, an Adelaide manufacturer of a vast range of metalware and cooking equipment. When Simpson's moved into manufacturing whitegoods, the Winning family followed suit and entered the same market.

The demand for gas stoves, electric ranges and petrol-powered and electric wringer washing machines increased after World War II, which resulted in R.W. Winning & Co. expanding staff numbers. Over the years, few agencies have been lost, and although the company still acts as a selling agent for certain products, it has become a recognised retailer in its own right.

The company was the first to introduce front loader washing machines into the Australian market, and units were delivered to retail outlets as well as installed into new properties on behalf of developers. Winning Appliances became an Australian pioneer in offering households white goods which were attractively displayed in kitchen settings. The first showroom was in Clarence Street before it was eventually moved to its current flagship site in Philip Street, Redfern.

The Winning family retains 100 per cent ownership of the business and trades as Winning Appliances Pty Ltd. The company significantly increased its ranges of products and services in the 1990s, and now has seven stores in New South Wales, in Brookvale, Crows Nest, Narellan, Newcastle, Northmead, Redfern and Taren Point, two in Queensland, in Fortitude Valley and Indooroopilly, two in Victoria, Brighton(previously Michael's), Richmond and one in the Australian Capital Territory in Kingston.

Its Brisbane showroom was opened in August 2011 and was the first store nationally to include bathroom fixtures and fittings. The second store opened in November 2012 in Indooroopilly.

In 2005, John Winning, son of former CEO John Winning Senior, launched Appliances Online as an online venture of Winning Appliances, servicing the white goods market. The company later purchased and re-launched Big Brown Box from Thorn Group, selling audio-visual products such as televisions.

In November 2011, John Murphy stepped down as general manager of Winning Appliances and was appointed CEO, while also continuing to lead Appliances Online, before becoming CEO of the Winning Group in 2012. The Winning Group comprises Appliances Online, Winning Appliances, Handy Crew (Which has now been re-branded as Winning Services) and Home Clearance.

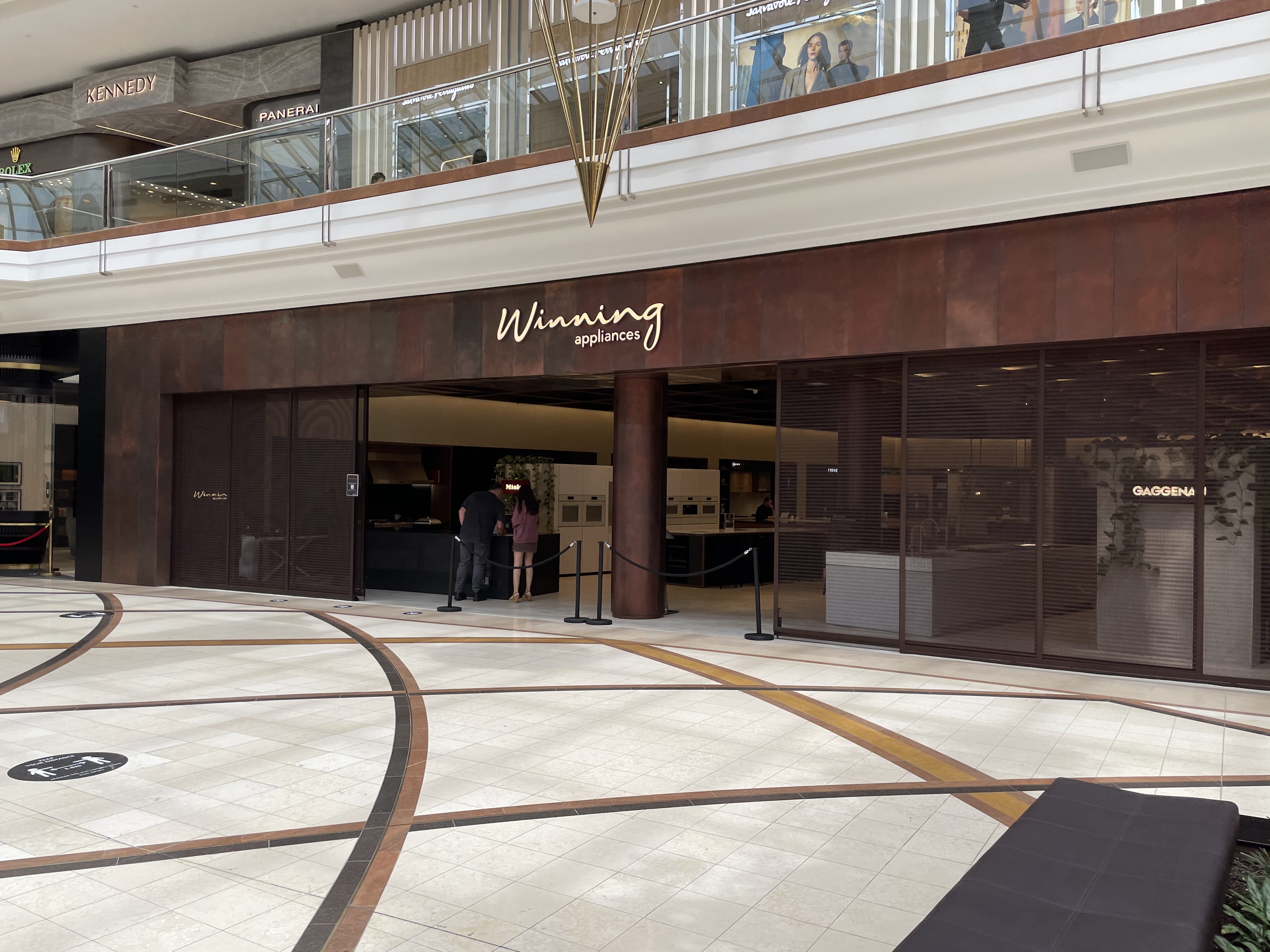
Winning Appliances in Chadstone Shopping Centre, November 2020

In 2012, Winning Appliances launched a national cooking competition and online food community called Best Home Chef. The top 25 recipes were chosen from the website, and the winner was selected by a judging panel at a live cook-off final in May 2013 at Winning Appliances' new Redfern showroom.

In June 2014, Winning Appliances expanded into the Western Australia market through its acquisition of Kitchen HQ.

In 2015, David Woollcott, previously the sales director at Miele, was appointed the new CEO of Winning Appliances, replacing David Crane.

In 2016, Winning Appliances expanded into the Australian Capital Territory, with the first Canberra Flagship Showroom opening in December.

The new Redfern Flagship Showroom was recognised at the 2014 World Retail Awards in Paris.

In July 2018, Winning Appliances acquired Michael's Appliance Centre, a deal which saw Michael Wood become an ambassador for the John Winning-owned company, while also announcing plans for two new store projects, a new flagship showroom in Richmond, Victoria; and a new showroom in Myaree, Western Australia.

The new Richmond showroom was Winning Appliance's 15th showroom and fifth flagship showroom, alongside Fortitude Valley, Kingston, Redfern and Osborne Park showrooms.

== Awards ==
- Australian Catalogue Association Awards, Home Entertainment – Whitegoods award for catalogues with distribution greater than 250,000
- City of Sydney Business Awards – 2012 Online Business of the Year

== Sponsorships ==
Winning Appliances has a long association with the sailing industry. The company sponsored the 2011 18 ft Winning Appliances JJ Giltinan Invitation Race.

The company also donated its boat, the MV JBW, to the Cruising Yacht Club of Australia for use as the Radio Relay Vessel during the Sydney to Hobart Yacht Race.

Winning Appliances was the naming rights sponsor of the Walkinshaw Andretti United Holden Commodore ZB of Scott Pye in 2019.
