= Media in Manchester =

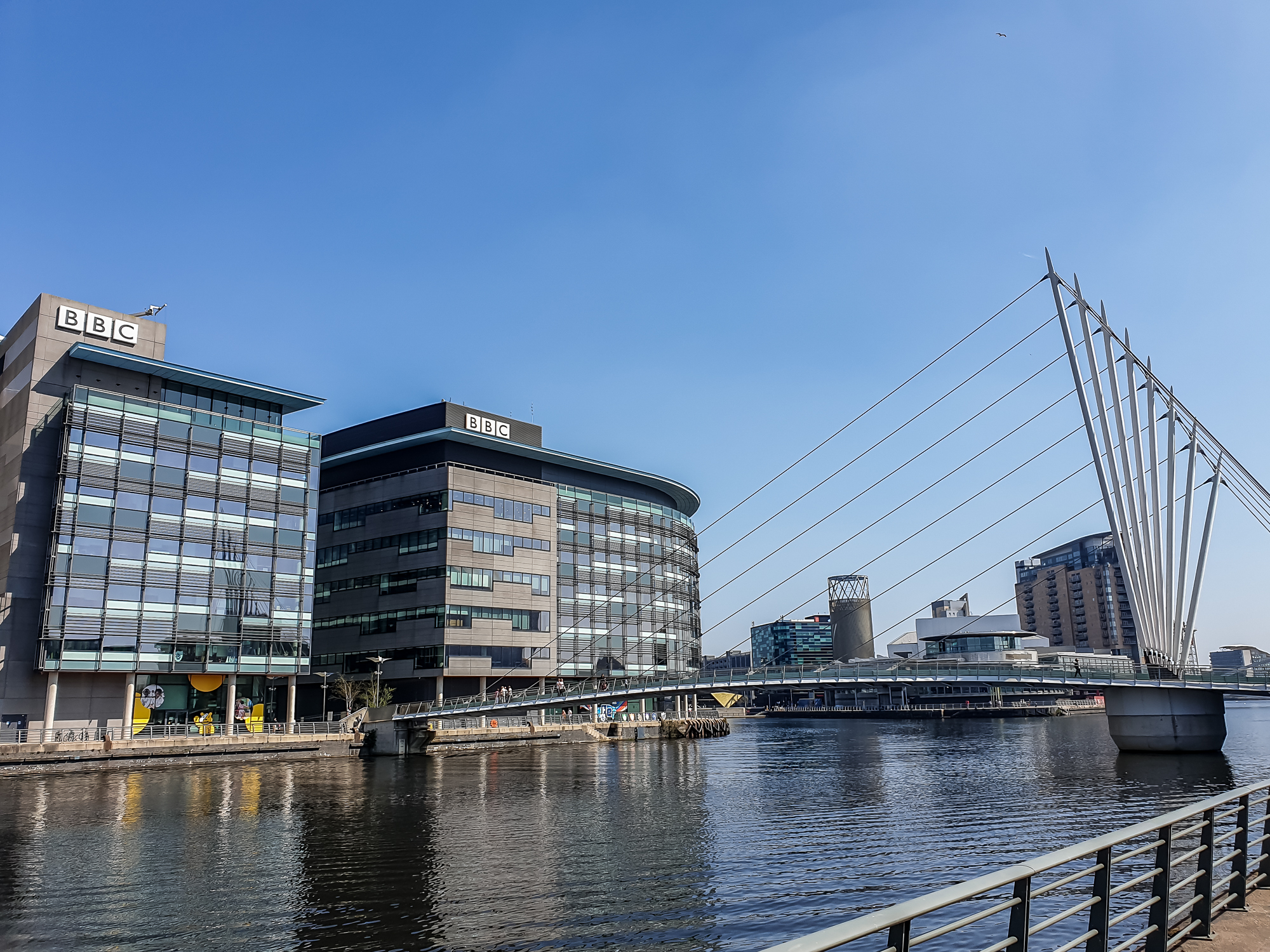
MediaCity is the largest media-production facility in Europe.

Media in Manchester has been an integral part of Manchester's culture and economy for many generations and has been described as the only other British city to rival to London in terms of television broadcasting. Today, Manchester is the second largest centre of the creative and digital industries in Europe.

Most notable television exports include the longest running serial soap drama in the world in Coronation Street and the longest running documentary series in 7 Up!. A wide array of award-winning British television programmes have originated from, and often been set in Manchester, such as Coronation Street, A Question of Sport, Dragons' Den, The Royle Family, University Challenge, Mastermind, Songs of Praise, Top of the Pops, It's a Knockout, World in Action, Seven Up!, Jewel in the Crown, Brideshead Revisited, Stars in Their Eyes, The Krypton Factor, Red Dwarf, Life on Mars, Cold Feet, Cracker and The Street. In the BFI TV list of greatest British television programmes decided by industry professionals in 2000, nine television programmes which were devised and produced in Manchester made the top 50.

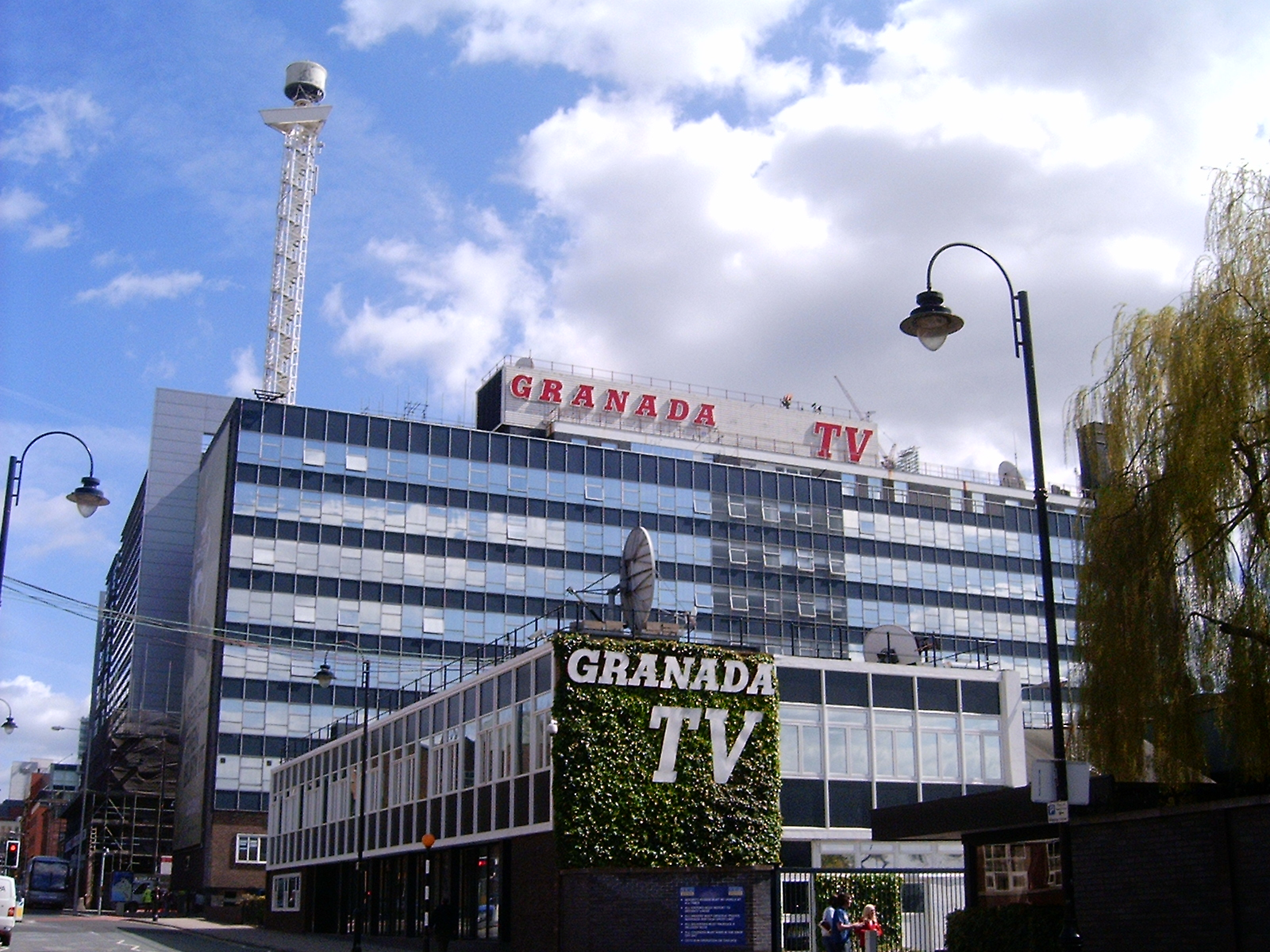
Granada Manchester was renowned for being one of ITV's most successful franchisees – the iconic red 'Granada TV' has since been removed and the Granada identity has ceased to exist

Manchester was given the nickname 'Granadaland', as many of the city's successful programmes were produced by Granada Television and its influential chairman Sidney Bernstein actively encouraged this nickname to promote Manchester and the North West. The company was based at Granada Studios in Manchester and was considered one of the best commercial television companies in the world by the Financial Times and The Independent. Granada had its own entertainment complex showcasing its television exports to the public. Eventually Granada took over eleven other franchisees through a series of hostile bids to form ITV in 2004, and consequently a more unified ITV corporate brand appeared.

The new MediaCityUK in Salford forms part of the major decentralisation of the BBC. The corporation opted to move to MediaCityUK in 2004 as a replacement for its ageing Mancunian studios at New Broadcasting House and Granada Studios - the latter being partly owned by both ITV and the BBC through 3SixtyMedia. At the same time, BBC Television Centre was also coming to the end of its lifespan, so the BBC decided to split departments between existing facilities in London and Greater Manchester. The BBC currently has a major broadcast division business operating here under the BBC North Group it comprises the departments BBC Breakfast, BBC Sport, BBC Children's, BBC Radio 5 Live, BBC Learning, BBC Research & Development and BBC Philharmonic presently broadcasting and producing. ITV also has a major division of its business based here ITV Studios which is responsible for all UK and international production.

The Guardian newspaper was founded in Manchester as the Manchester Guardian and the city's regional newspaper, the Manchester Evening News is the second most popular regional newspaper in the UK after the Evening Standard.

== Television broadcasting ==
Television broadcasts spread to the North West relatively late – the first monochrome 405 line television transmitter covering the area (from Holme Moss) did not open until 1951. Commercial TV began in May 1956 and the signals were broadcast from Winter Hill.

=== BBC in Manchester ===
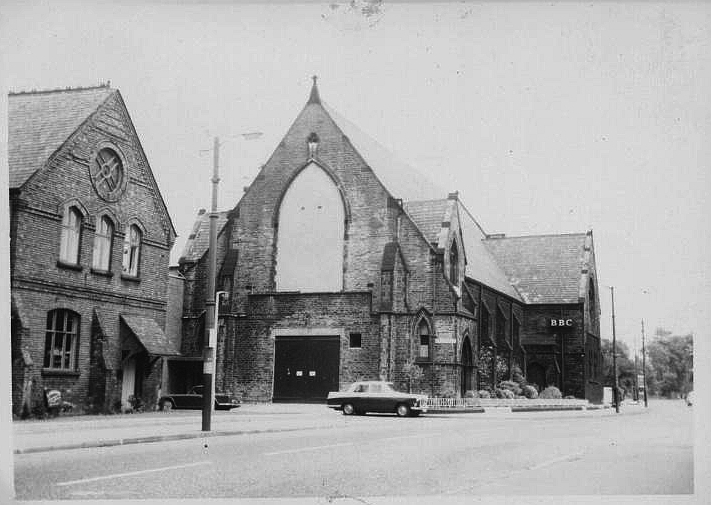
Dickenson Road Studios in Rusholme

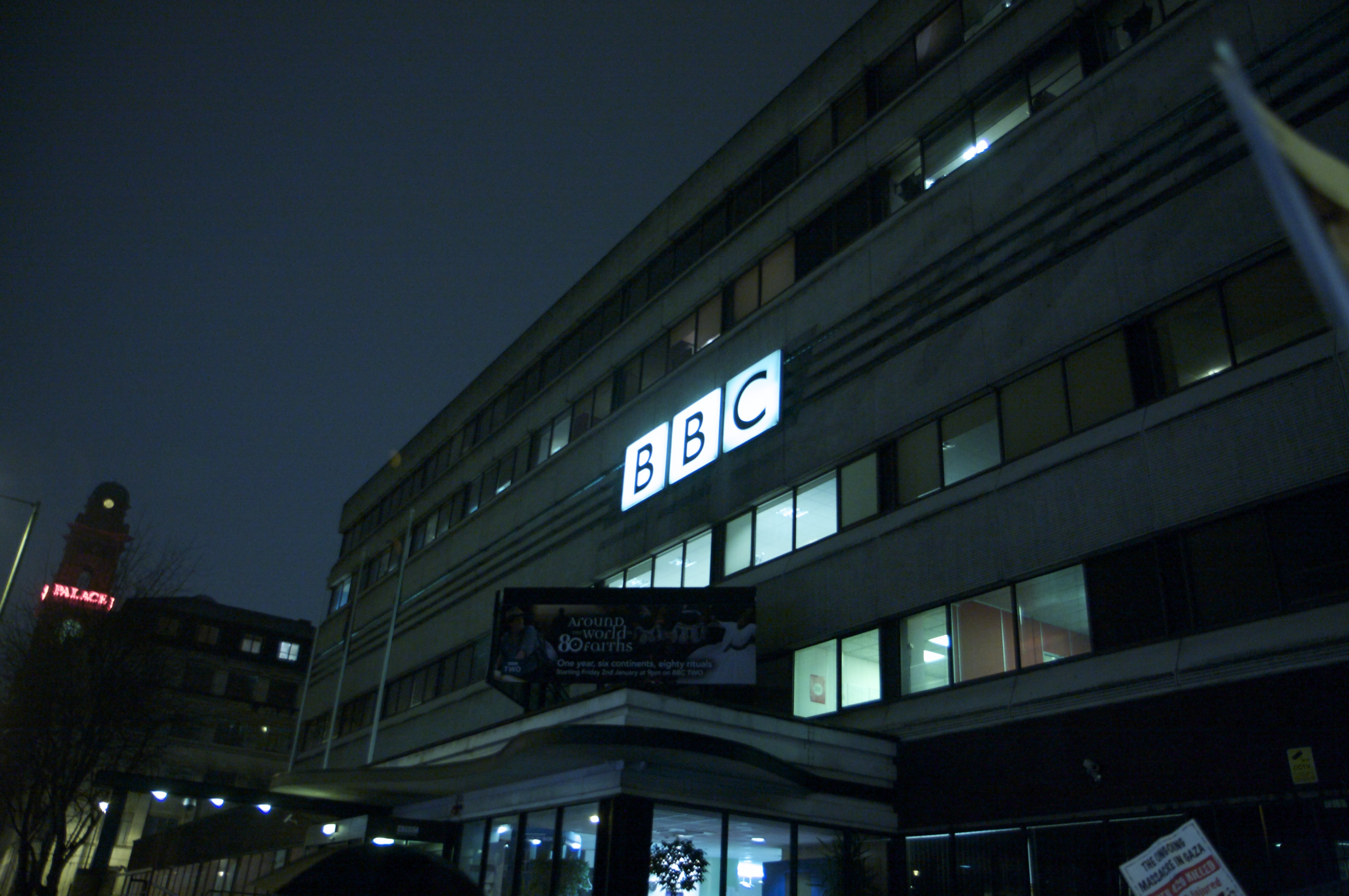
New Broadcasting House which is often referred to as BBC Manchester Studios

Dickenson Road Studios, the former home of Mancunian Films in a converted Methodist Church in Rusholme, was bought by the BBC in 1954 to become its first regional TV production studio. The facilities at Studio A, recalled Olive Shapley, a BBC television producer from 1959, consisted of

one studio and very cramped make up and other production facilities, with a canteen and a few poky little dressing rooms. We coped well enough, though I do remember apologising sometimes to guests who clearly found the place not quite up to their expectations of the BBC.

The first edition of Top of the Pops was broadcast on New Year's Day 1964 from the studio, and Yorkshire host Jimmy Savile stated: "anything they didn't want to do in London, they slung up into this old church. And, of course, they didn't want anything to do with pop music so that was our place". But when viewing figures took off the BBC decided that the pop show had to be broadcast from London, although it remained based in Manchester for three years before moving to Lime Grove Studios in west London in 1967.

The BBC's northern Outside Broadcast base was at the former Longsight Free Christian Church, on the corner of Plymouth Grove and Birch Lane in Longsight.

The BBC began regional TV news bulletins in 1957 from Broadcasting House in Piccadilly, and in September 1969 its Look North evening regional opt-out became part of the Nationwide programme (the former evolved into the current programme North West Tonight).

The 1970s marked a change for the BBC's involvement in Manchester and it appeared that the city had been given more licence to produce programmes for national consumption. The revival of It's a Knockout was one such success; with the show attracting only 100,000 viewers the BBC hired a reluctant Stuart Hall to present the show in a new format, and within a few years the show was attracting 15 million viewers nationally.

1975 also marked the year Manchester finally got its purpose-built BBC studio in the form of New Broadcasting House on Oxford Road in Manchester City centre. The new Network Production Centre (NPC) in the north of England was given licence to produce programmes for national consumption, one of its first successes .

Programmes including A Question of Sport, Mastermind, and Real Story, are made at New Broadcasting House on Oxford Road, just south of the city centre. The hit series Cutting It was set in the city's Northern Quarter and ran on BBC1 for five series. Life on Mars was set in 1973 Manchester. Also, The Street, winner of a BAFTA and International Emmy Award in 2007 is set in Manchester. Manchester is also the regional base for the BBC One North West Region so programmes like North West Tonight are produced here. The BBC intends to relocate large numbers of staff and facilities from London to MediaCityUK at Salford Quays. The Children's (CBBC), Comedy, Sport (BBC Sport) and New Media departments are all scheduled to move before 2010.

=== Demise of ABC Television ===
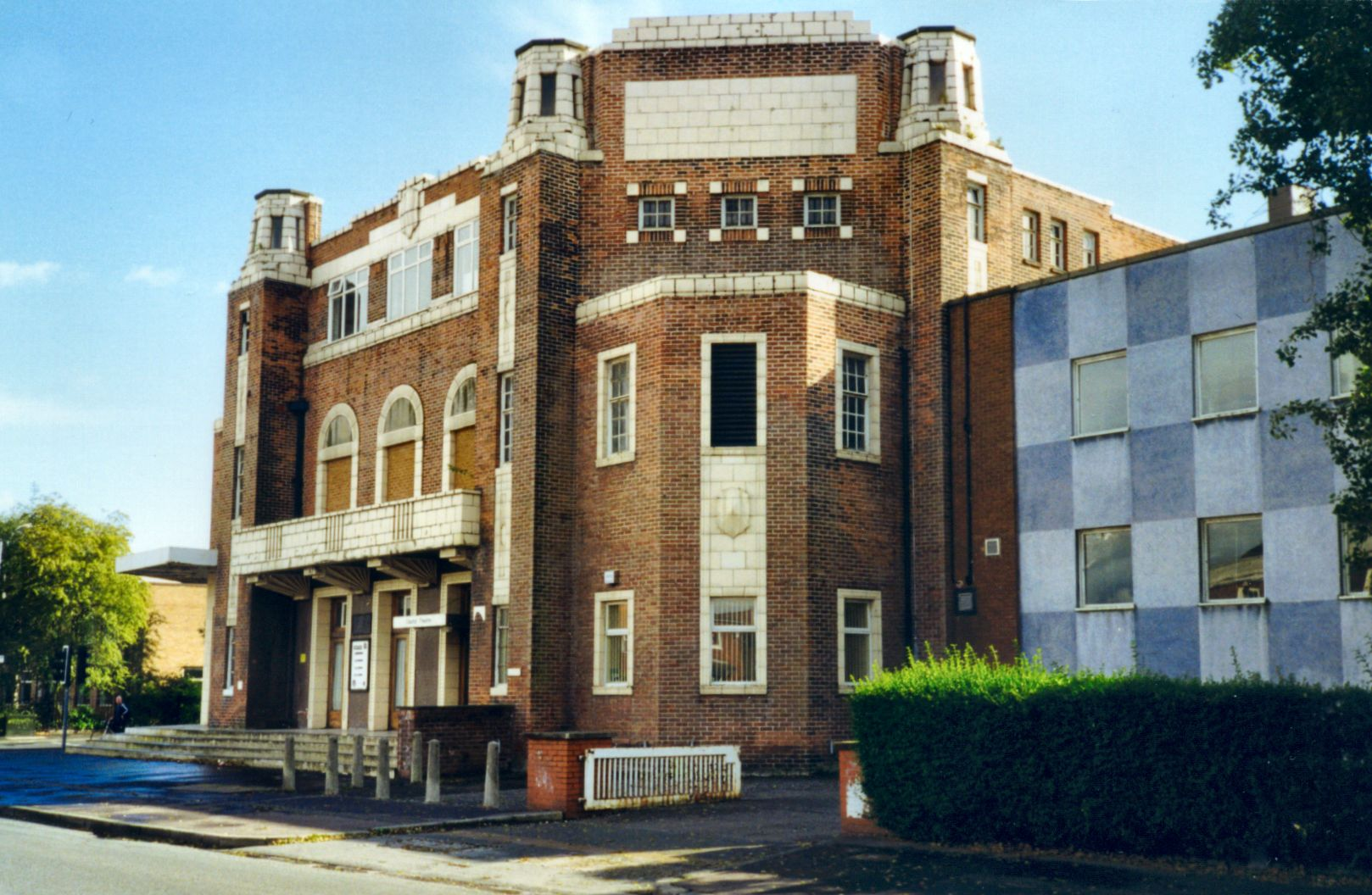
Capitol Theatre, formerly ABC Weekend Television's northern studios in Didsbury

Between 1956 and 1969, the old Capitol Theatre at the junction of Parrs Wood Road and School Lane served as the northern studios of ITV station ABC Weekend Television. Early episodes of The Avengers and programmes such as Opportunity Knocks were made in the studios. ABC ceased to use the site in 1968 when it lost its ITV franchise, on its merger with fellow ITV company Rediffusion. The site was then used briefly by Yorkshire Television until its own facilities in Leeds were ready. In 1971, the studios were acquired by Manchester Polytechnic, who used it for cinema, television studies and theatre. The building was demolished in the late 1990s to make way for a residential development, but the name lives on in the form of a new theatre space in the heart of the M.M.U. campus in the All Saints area along Oxford Road, just to the south of Manchester city centre.

=== Granada Television Studios, Manchester ===
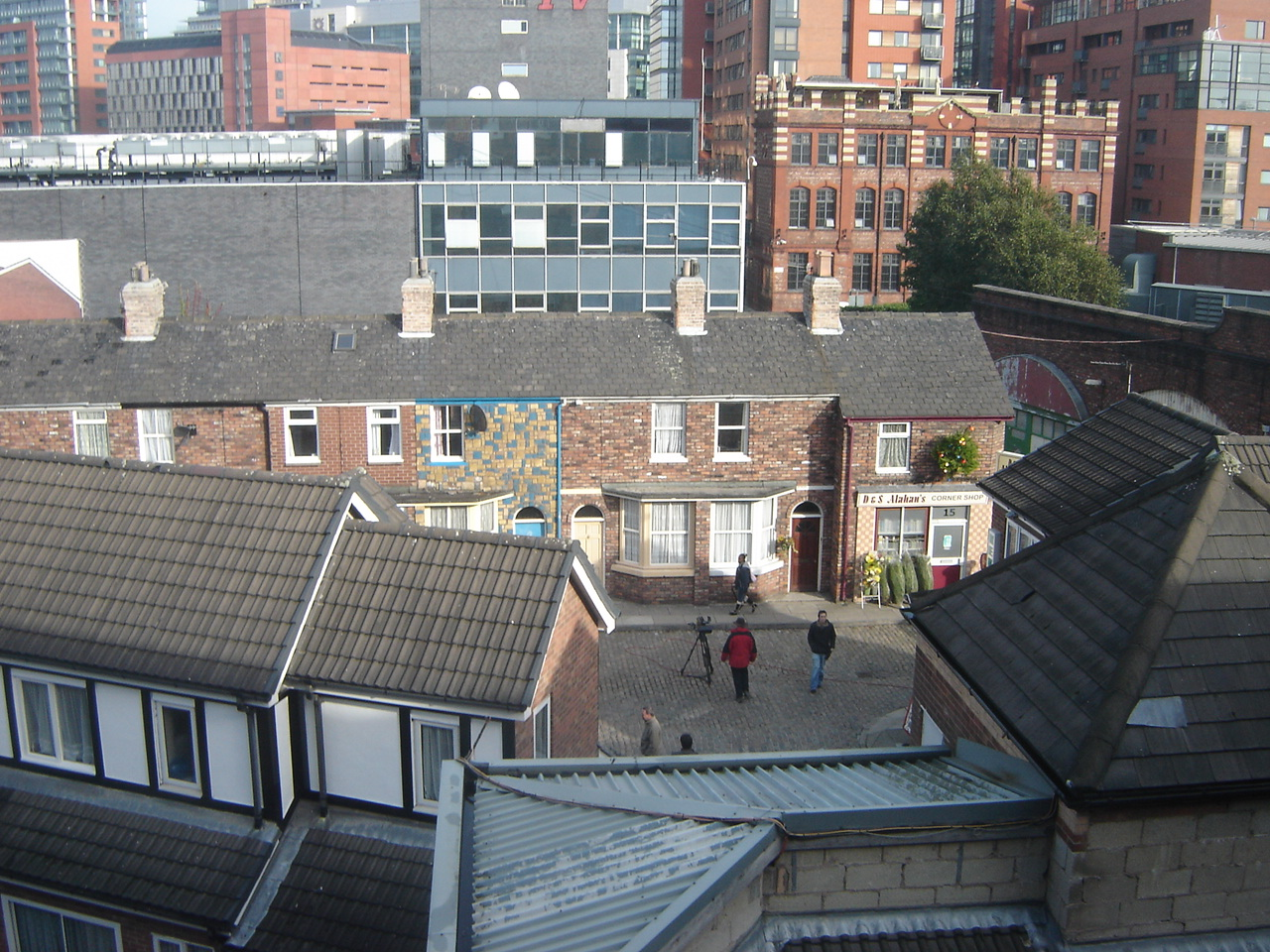
Exterior scenes of Coronation Street were originally filmed in at the Granada Studios in Manchester City Centre.

Granada Television in Manchester was arguably ITV's most successful franchisee. Kenneth Clark stated as early as 1958 that: "We did not quite foresee how much Granada would develop a character which distinguishes it most markedly from the other programmes companies and from the BBC." It was the only original franchisee formed in 1954 that kept its licence for North West England into the 21st century, fuelled by commercially successful productions such as its flagship programme, Coronation Street. Granada Television's parent company Granada PLC took over the 11 other ITV franchise holders from 1994 and by 2004 only a Carlton Communications stood in Granada's way. The formation of ITV was reported as a merger, but it was in effect a takeover by Granada who would own 68% of the new shares with Carlton getting 32%. Granada Television's on-screen identity no longer exists due to the formation of ITV and Granada Television productions are now known with the ITV Studios.

The first ITV franchisee was Granada Television, which remained the service provider until it was absorbed into the ITV Network in 2004. Granada has its headquarters in a distinctive purpose built building on Quay Street, in the Castlefield area of the city. Granada produces the world's oldest and most watched television soap opera, Coronation Street, which is screened five times a week on ITV.

=== BBC and ITV move out of Manchester City Centre to MediaCityUK ===
By the 2000s, Manchester had proved itself as a key base for the ITV brand with its Granada franchise and BBC North at New Broadcasting House. Granada Television based in Manchester was one of ITV's most successful franchises along with Thames Television (until 1992) and London Weekend Television (LWT), which was often thanks to successful programmes produced in Manchester such as Coronation Street. The BBC considers Manchester as one of the two main BBC production bases (London) in the United Kingdom.

The turn of the millennium also saw Manchester gain its own television channel, Channel M, owned by the Guardian Media Group and operated since 2000. The launch of the station on digital satellite services in April 2006 led to an increase of the station's local output (news, sport, entertainment etc.) until major cutbacks led to the end of in-house programming in March 2010. The vacuum for local programming has since been filled by Manchester.tv and QuaysNews.net

In June 2004, it was revealed that the BBC planned to redevelop the aging New Broadcasting House on Oxford Road in Manchester and with it will take the opportunity to transfer 1000 jobs out of London to bring investment in Northern England to the level the BBC invest in London, Birmingham and Bristol.

The Studios, which opened in 2013, is a separate studio complex at MediaCityUK, operated by dock10. The Studios is home to shows such as The Jeremy Kyle Show, The Voice UK and Match of the Day.

=== Production companies based in Manchester ===
- 3SixtyMedia – a joint venture between Granada Manchester and BBC North in Manchester with primary aim to pool resources. The company is beneficial to both as programmes produced for BBC are sometimes made by Granada Manchester such as University Challenge at The Manchester Studios.
- Red Production Company – formed by Nicola Schindler who left Granada Manchester after ITV plc was formed in 2004.

== Radio ==
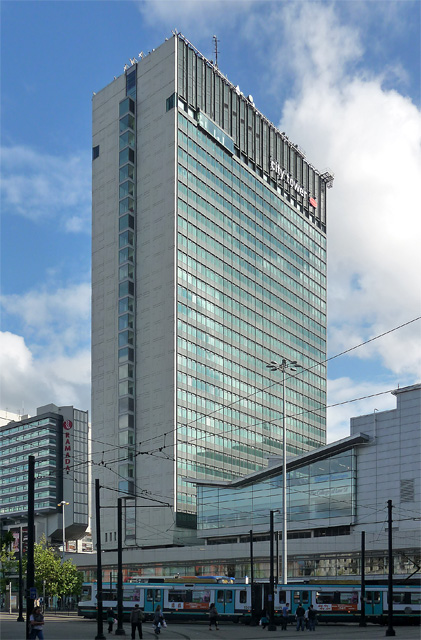
City Tower is a main broadcast station for many of Greater Manchester's radio stations

A number of regional and national radio stations broadcast from Manchester:

- BBC Radio 5 Live – National
- BBC Radio 5 Sports Extra – National
- BBC Radio Manchester – Manchester area
- Capital Manchester – Manchester area
- Hits Radio Manchester – Manchester area
- Greatest Hits Manchester – Manchester area

Manchester was an important location for early radio broadcasts in Britain, the first of which were made by the Marconi Company when it began experimental transmissions of a station that was known as 2ZY on 17 May 1922. The British Broadcasting Company was granted a licence for AM radio broadcasts in October of the same year and inaugurated a station called 2LO in London on 14 November 1922, followed the next day by 2ZY, the BBC's official Manchester station. 2ZY made regular transmissions from the Metropolitan-Vickers factory in Trafford Park on 800 kHz (375 metres) Medium Wave).

In July 1925 the BBC opened a much higher powered transmitter at Daventry, Northamptonshire, which broadcast on 187.5 kHz (1562 metres) Long wave and was receivable across most of Britain. The station was called 5XX and it conducted its first experimental stereo broadcast from a concert in Manchester. The 5XX Long Wave transmitter beamed the right channel and all the local BBC Medium Wave transmitters broadcast the left channel. The BBC opened a central Control Room on Piccadilly in Manchester in 1929 from where many network radio programmes were made or transmitted and several technical innovations were installed – including volume metres, the precursor of the PPM. Radio plays and concerts were staged in an old converted repertory theatre hall in Hulme which was renamed 'The Radio Playhouse'. The 2ZY Orchestra created in 1922 went on to play a pivotal role in the establishment of the Northern Wireless Orchestra (and later the BBC Philharmonic Orchestra).

Programme content made in Manchester included radio features on subjects like Cotton and Coal. One example, Joan Littlewood and Olive Shapley's The Classic Soil (1939), on the Manchester poor, was inspired by an assertion of Fredrick Engels that the city was "the classic soil . . . where capitalism flourished". Many well-known networked radio comedies and concerts as well as Woman's Hour were produced in Manchester. It was not until the late 1960s that true local radio services began across Britain and BBC Radio Manchester was first launched in 1970 on 95.3 MHz VHF. The Medium Wave frequency of 1458 kHz (206 metres) was opened later. Independent Commercial radio began in Britain in 1973 so on 2 April the following year Piccadilly Radio was launched in Manchester on 1146 kHz (261 metres) medium wave and 97.0 MHz vhf (the frequency was changed in 1986).

The BBC's original radio studios became cramped and outdated so all operations were moved to a large new purpose built studio complex on Oxford Road which was named New Broadcasting House (known as NBH) which were in use for both TV and radio production by the spring of 1976 (the old studios on Piccadilly were finally closed in 1981). The number of hours of productions made in Manchester then increased until at its peak in the 1990s around 20% of the output on the newly opened BBC Radio 5 Live in 1994. Around 10% of BBC Radio 4 programming and a daily afternoon show on BBC Radio 1 (Mark & Lard) were all being made in and broadcast from Manchester.

The commercial station Piccadilly Radio was re-branded in 1988 when the services were split in two: AM became Piccadilly Gold and FM was named Key 103 (now Hits Radio). A number of new local commercial services were licensed by the Radio Authority in the late 1980s and 1990s. This proliferation has meant that the radio market in Manchester now has the highest number of local radio stations outside London including BBC Radio Manchester, Key 103, Greatest Hits Manchester, Capital Manchester, Heart North West, Smooth North West, XS Manchester and Gold. BBC Radio Manchester returned to its original title in 2006 after becoming BBC GMR in 1988.

Throughout the last 40 years Manchester has also heard many pirate, student, temporary (Restricted Service Licence) and unofficial radio stations. Student radio stations include Shock Radio and Utter Radio at the University of Salford, Fuse FM at the University of Manchester and MMU Radio at the Manchester Metropolitan University. A community radio network is coordinated by Radio Regen, with stations covering the South Manchester communities of Ardwick, Longsight and Levenshulme (All FM 96.9) and Wythenshawe (Wythenshawe FM 97.2Mhz).

One of the earliest pirate stations, started in 1979 on 94.6 MHz FM, was called Andromeda which broadcast to the entire conurbation from various locations on the hills around Tameside. Defunct (official) radio stations include Sunset 102 (which became Kiss 102, now Capital Manchester), and KFM (which became Signal Cheshire, now Imagine FM). These stations, as well as many 1990s pirates, played a significant role in the city's House music culture, also known as the Madchester scene, which was based around clubs like The Haçienda (which had its own shows on Sunset and on Kiss 102). Some of the best known voices on UK radio began their careers in (or featured regularly on) radio made in Manchester including: radio producer and author Karl Pilkington, of The Ricky Gervais Show; Allan Beswick, Andy Crane, Terry Christian, David Dunne, Nemone, Andy Kershaw, Andy Peebles, Brian Redhead, James Stannage, Mike Sweeny, Julian Worricker.

== Film ==
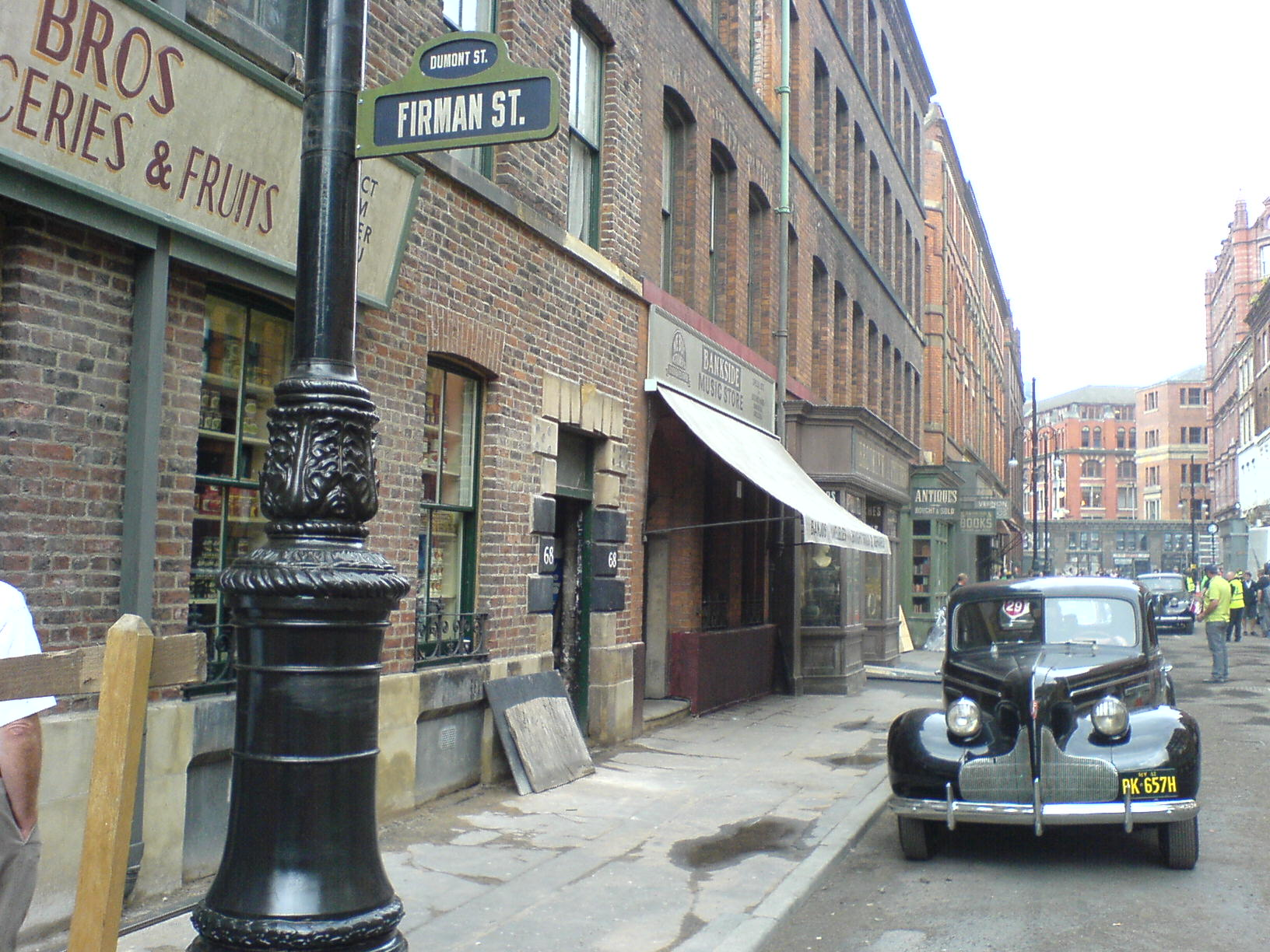
Filming Captain America: The First Avenger in Manchester, 2010.

Manchester is featured in several Hollywood films such as My Son, My Son! (1940), directed by Charles Vidor and starring Brian Aherne and Louis Hayward. The city was also mentioned frequently in Grand Hotel (1932), in which an industrialist, played by Wallace Beery, frantically tries to secure a deal with a cotton company based in Manchester, and it was also mentioned very briefly by Myrna Loy in Too Hot to Handle (1938). Others include Velvet Goldmine starring Ewan McGregor, and Sir Alec Guinness's The Man in the White Suit. More recently, the entire city of Manchester is engulfed in runaway fires in the 2002 film 28 Days Later. The 2004 Japanese animated film, Steamboy was partly set in Manchester, during the times of the industrial revolution. The city has held the Commonwealth Film Festival and it has been the home of the biennial Insight Film Festival (2007-2013). Since 2015, it has hosted the Manchester Film Festival.

In recent years a number of Hollywood films have been filmed in Manchester, with the city historic Northern Quarter district used due to its pre-WW2 architecture. In 2010, the car chase scene in Captain America: The First Avenger was filmed on Dale Street in the Northern Quarter. Producers chose Manchester because of its resemblance to 1940s New York City with its high buildings dating from pre-WW2 and the site is a shortlisted UNESCO world heritage site. In 2004, the Northern Quarter district was also used for the filming of Alfie.

The 2009 film Sherlock Holmes was extensively filmed in Manchester alongside London and Liverpool. The movie was filmed in such locations as the Northern Quarter, Jersey Street in Ancoats and inside Manchester Town Hall.

== Newspapers ==
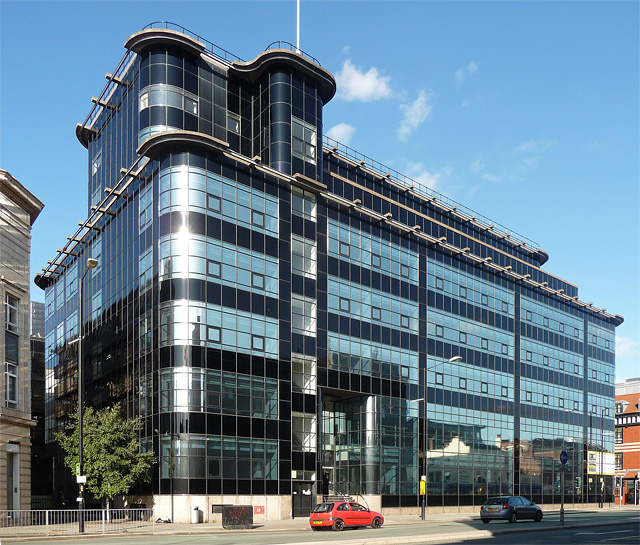
The Daily Express Building, Manchester, built in the 1930s but since vacated by the Daily Express. Newspaper printing still takes place at the building

At certain points in the 1800s Manchester had up to seven newspapers – this was not unusual, many towns and cities had a plethora of papers at this time. The Manchester Guardian however being the largest, selling more than any other regional newspaper (average of 51,000 in 1837). The others were at various times: Manchester Herald, Manchester Advertiser, Manchester Times, Manchester Chronicle, Manchester Courier, Manchester Voice. The Guardian newspaper was founded in Manchester in 1821. It no longer has a head office in Manchester after the sale of the Manchester Evening News to Trinity Mirror, which is now based in Oldham. Many management functions of The Guardian were moved to London in 1964. Its sister publication, the Manchester Evening News, has the largest circulation of a UK regional evening newspaper. It is free in the city centre, but paid for in the suburbs. Despite its title, it is available all day.

The Metro North West is available free at Metrolink stops, rail stations and other busy transit locations. The MEN group distributes several local weekly free papers. For many years most of the national newspapers had offices in Manchester: The Daily Telegraph, Daily Express, Daily Mail, The Daily Mirror, The Sun. Only The Daily Sport remains based in Manchester. At its height, 1,500 journalists were employed, though in the 1980s office closures began and today the "second Fleet Street" is no more. An attempt to launch a Northern daily newspaper, the North West Times, employing journalists made redundant by other titles, closed in 1988.[155] Another attempt was made with the North West Enquirer, which hoped to provide a true "regional" newspaper for the North West, much in the same vein as the Yorkshire Post does for Yorkshire or The Northern Echo does for the North East; it folded in October 2006. There are several local lifestyle magazines, including YQ Magazine and Moving Manchester.

Since 2013, the online news platform Prolific North, has been covering the media and marketing communities of the North from its base in Manchester. With over 100,000 unique readers a month, the title has established itself as the biggest media outlet outside London spanning an array of initiatives, awards and three annual expos.

Another publisher is The Manchester Gazette, an online news organisation covering the City and 10 Boroughs of Greater Manchester. A new addition is Business Manchester, a business news only website, catering for the Greater Manchester business community, which has caught the attention of circa 20,000 business readers in the region.

The online news organisation Live Manchester launched in 2014, dedicated to live music, theatre and cultural events taking place in the city and surrounding area.

== Magazines ==
There are several local lifestyle magazines, including YQ Magazine and Moving Manchester. City Life was a listings magazine which was published fortnightly between 1983–2005 until it was absorbed into the MEN. A single edition of Time Out Manchester was published in 2006.

== Student media ==
Most universities in Manchester have media entities run by students. Examples include weekly newspaper The Mancunion, online magazine The Manchester Magazine, radio station Fuse Fm and video channel Fuse Tv.

== See also ==
- Television programmes produced, filmed or set in Manchester
