= Oxford Road Show =

- Genre: Music show
- Country of origin: United Kingdom
- Original language: English
- No. of series: 5
- No. of episodes: 63

Production
- Production location: New Broadcasting House
- Running time: 40 minutes
- Production company: BBC Manchester

Original release
- Network: BBC2
- Release: 16 January 1981 – 29 March 1985

Oxford Road Show is a music show that aired on BBC2 from 16 January 1981 to 29 March 1985. The show featured live music, pop music news and competitions and was also presented as addressing issues for young adults by young adults.

The programme's title was taken from its studio location, the BBC's New Broadcasting House on Oxford Road, Manchester. The Radio Times listing for the first programme mentions that it is "Not from Oxford. Not a 'roadshow'."

Many bands and artists popular at the time performed on the show including Duran Duran, Generation X, Siouxsie and the Banshees, The Cure, Magnum, The Psychedelic Furs, Queen, Spandau Ballet, UFO, Big Country, The Alarm, Simple Minds, XTC, Madness, Japan, U2, Marillion, Soft Cell, The Farm, Tears for Fears, Bauhaus, Orchestral Manoeuvres in the Dark, The Undertones, UB40, China Crisis, Frankie Goes to Hollywood, The Beat, Wah!, Dead or Alive, Bronski Beat, Spear of Destiny, Sade, Ultravox and The Smiths. Ben Elton, then largely unknown, had a regular stand up comedy spot on the show.

== Transmissions ==
Series	Start date	End date	Episodes
1	16 January 1981	20 March 1981	10
2	20 November 1981	19 February 1982	12
3	19 November 1982	18 March 1983	16
4	6 January 1984	30 March 1984	13
5	11 January 1985	29 March 1985	12
