= BBC North West =

Region of the British Broadcasting Corporation

- BBC North West's area within the UK
- TV transmitters: Winter Hill and all relays.
- Radio stations: BBC Radio Lancashire; BBC Radio Manchester; BBC Radio Merseyside; BBC Radio Cumbria (South); BBC Radio Stoke (South Cheshire)
- Headquarters: MediaCity, Salford Quays, Greater Manchester
- Area: Cheshire; Greater Manchester; Lancashire; Merseyside; North Yorkshire (western Craven); Derbyshire (western High Peak); Staffordshire (Biddulph); Cumbria (Barrow-in-Furness and South Lakeland); Isle of Man
- Nation: BBC English Regions
- Regions: North West, Isle of Man and parts of Yorkshire and East Midlands
- Key people: Aziz Rashid; (Head of Regional & Local Programmes)
- Launch date: 15 November 1922 (radio); September 1957 (television)

BBC North West is the BBC English Region serving Cheshire, Greater Manchester, Lancashire, Merseyside, as well as parts of North Yorkshire (western Craven), Derbyshire (western High Peak), Staffordshire (Biddulph), Cumbria (Barrow-in-Furness and South Lakeland) and the Isle of Man.

The region also covered the rest of Cumbria during the late 1980s, complete with an opt-out television news service for the area, before it was transferred to the BBC North East region owing to high viewer demand. Today, the region is part of the larger BBC North division based at MediaCityUK in Salford Quays.

== Services ==
=== Television ===
BBC North West produces regional TV news, used to produce current affairs and still has sports output including the flagship nightly news programme North West Tonight, alongside daytime North West Today bulletins and opt-out updates on weekdays during BBC Breakfast.

Non-news output used to consist of the current affairs programme Inside Out North West but the programme and current affairs output was abandoned. It still produces a weekly political programme, Politics North West, on Sunday mornings.

=== Radio ===
The region is the controlling centre for BBC Radio Lancashire, BBC Radio Manchester and BBC Radio Merseyside.

Radio Manchester, Radio Merseyside and Radio Lancashire broadcast between 6 am and 10 pm on weekdays and between 6 am and 6 pm on weekends Sundays is now 6am-2pm with 2pm-6pm on Sundays now a sports focused slot if no local sports coverage is scheduled network programming on Sundays on BBC Local Radio is 2pm-6am. All stations simulcast the same schedule from 10 pm - 6 am.

=== Online and Interactive ===
BBC North West also produces regional news & local radio pages for BBC Red Button and BBC Local News websites for each county and the Isle of Man.

== History ==
=== Radio ===
Regional broadcasting in the North West began on 15 November 1922 when the BBC opened its Manchester radio station 2ZY, followed two years later by the opening of a Liverpool-based relay station, 2LY.

At this point, the Manchester operation covered the entire North of England and northern parts of the Midlands, with relay stations in Leeds (2LS), Hull (6KH), Nottingham (5NG) and Stoke-on-Trent (6ST) carrying 2ZY output. Early broadcasts were made from studios at the Metropolitan-Vickers electricity works in Old Trafford.

When the BBC National Programme commenced from London, output from Manchester was moved to the BBC Regional Programme, and in 1929, operations started from Broadcasting House, a leased studio complex above a bank in Piccadilly Gardens. From March 1936, the Manchester-based Northern radio service began serving Northern Ireland after the opening of a new transmitter at Lisnagarvey (albeit with an additional local opt-out). A year later, the opening of the Stagshaw transmitter also allowed listeners in the North East and Cumbria to receive an opt-out from the main service.

When regional radio services resumed after the Second World War, Manchester-based output was broadcast on a Northern version of the Home Service, which would continue to serve Northern Ireland until January 1963. BBC Local Radio was introduced to the North West on 22 November 1967 with the launch of Radio Merseyside in Liverpool, followed on 10 September 1970 by Radio Manchester and on 26 January 1971 by Radio Blackburn (later relaunched as BBC Radio Lancashire).

The expansion of local radio services led to a gradual reduction of regional radio programmes (covering both the North West and Yorkshire areas from the Holme Moss transmitter) on what had now become BBC Radio 4. The last regional programme to be aired on Radio 4 North was an early-evening news opt-out on Friday 12 September 1980. Regional output for the North West would later resurface on the BBC's local radio stations in the evening and late night time slots.

The BBC has never produced radio services for the Isle of Man although national BBC radio is available. Local radio services on the island are provided by Manx stations such as Manx Radio and Energy FM.

=== Television ===
When the BBC launched daily regional television news in September 1957, the whole of northern England was initially covered as one region from Manchester. Short bulletins called News from the North began broadcasting on 30 September to what are now the North West, Yorkshire & North Midlands, East Yorkshire & Lincolnshire and North East & Cumbria areas.

Two years later, the opt-outs were refocused to cover the North West, including the Yorkshire & Lincolnshire areas, as the North East and Cumbria were now receiving their own news bulletins. By 1962, the bulletins had been expanded into a 20-minute magazine programme and renamed North at Six, and later, Look North..

The current North West region was introduced on 25 March 1968 when a separate Leeds-based edition of Look North for Yorkshire, Lincolnshire and the North Midlands was launched.

Between 5 April 1976 and 12 September 1980, BBC North West made use of regional presentation and continuity announcers during weekday evening programmes on BBC1.

Also in 1980, the Manchester edition of Look North was renamed Look North West in an attempt to avoid confusion for neighbouring viewers in Yorkshire. Regional television news remained at Piccadilly Gardens until finally moving into New Broadcasting House in Oxford Road on 18 May 1981.

On 3 September 1984, the programme changed to its current title of North West Tonight. Between 1986 and 1989, the region also covered parts of Cumbria that were previously served by the Newcastle edition of Look North and provided a news opt-out for the area served by the Caldbeck transmitter at lunchtime. However, viewers' complaints led to Cumbrian news coverage being switched back to Look North from Newcastle.

After 30 years of operation from New Broadcasting House, BBC North West television began broadcasting from MediaCityUK at Salford Quays on the morning of Monday 28 November 2011.

== Studios ==
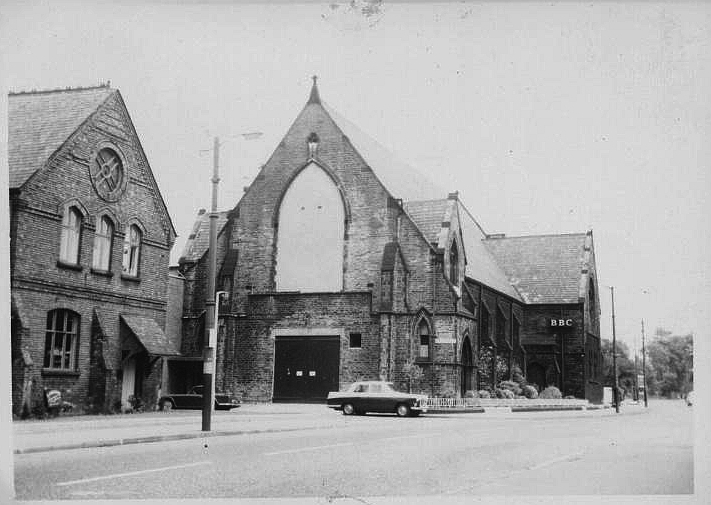
Dickenson Road Studios, the first BBC television studio in Manchester, pictured in the 1960s.

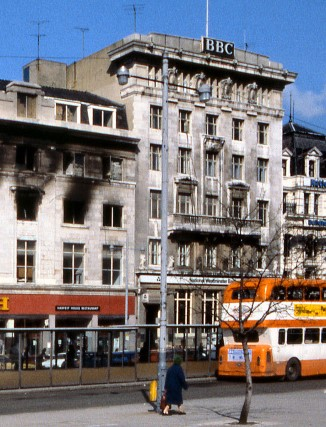
BBC Broadcasting House in Piccadilly Gardens

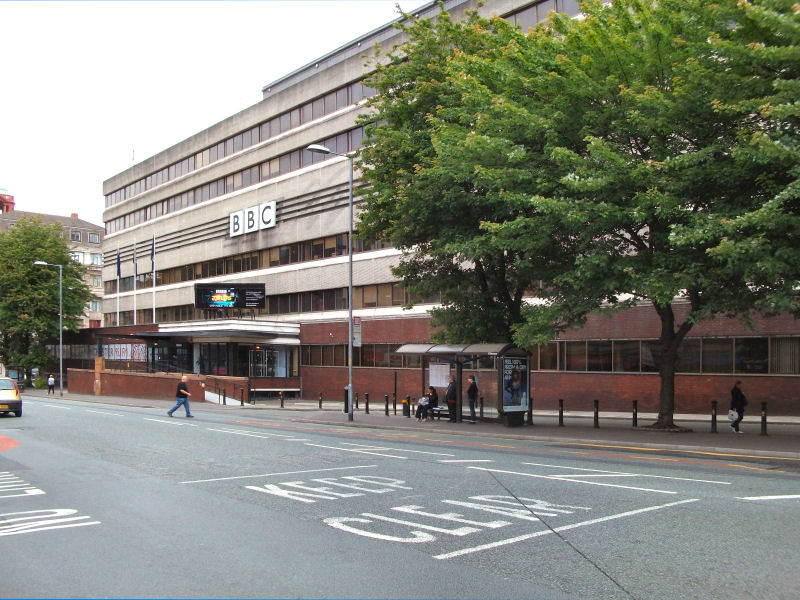
New Broadcasting House on Oxford Road )now demolished)

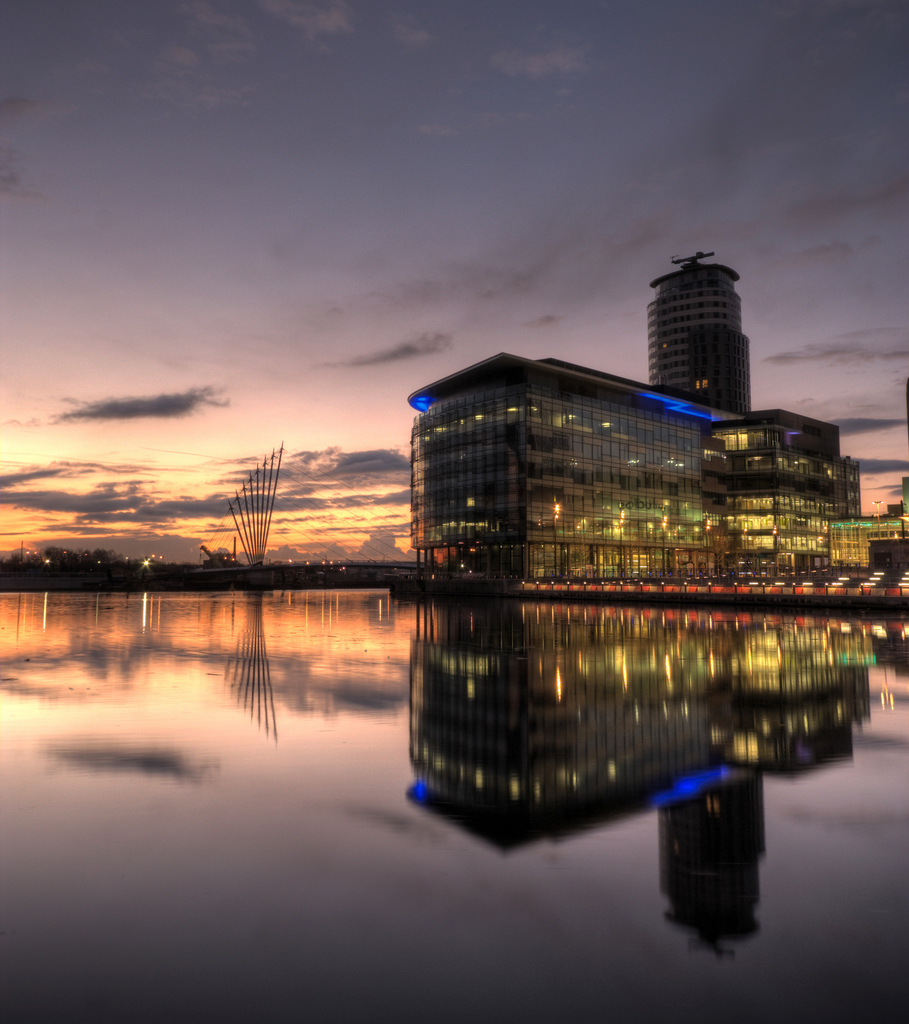
BBC Quay House at MediaCityUK in Salford Quays

From 1929 until 1981, many of the BBC's Manchester operations were based at Broadcasting House in the Piccadilly Gardens area of Manchester City Centre. The building had been leased to the corporation from a bank on the ground floor and became the central control room for regional and network radio production from the city.

In 1954, a former Methodist church on Dickenson Road in Rusholme became the BBC's first Manchester television studio, Dickenson Road Studios. It was bought from Mancunian Films, who had converted the church building in 1947.

The Dickenson Road facilities became the main home of the city's network production base, providing facilities for television drama. It was here that the early editions of the long-running programme Top Of The Pops were produced. The BBC's northern outside broadcast units were located at another former church nearby, on the corner of Birch Lane and Plymouth Grove in Longsight.

Meanwhile, regional television news and presentation began in September 1957, firstly from the crypt at Dickenson Road, before moving two years later to Broadcasting House in Piccadilly Gardens.

By 1967, planning had begun on creating a new broadcasting centre which would house radio and television on both network & regional levels as well as rehearsal space (studio 7) for the BBC's Northern Symphony Orchestra (later to become the BBC Philharmonic).

New Broadcasting House on Oxford Road began operations in July 1975 when network television production was transferred from the Dickenson Road studio into the much larger Studio A. Studio B, which would be used for regional TV news (Look North West, North West Tonight) was opened in May 1981, allowing the BBC to vacate its studios at Piccadilly after 52 years.

Regular production in Studio A continued until 2000, when it was mothballed. Meanwhile, the BBC launched a joint facilities venture with ITV Granada, called 3SixtyMedia, which saw both broadcasters pool their studio resources at both Oxford Road and Granada's Quay Street complex. As a result, Studio A was re-opened in 2005 as a four-waller, primarily for drama productions including Life on Mars.

BBC North West moved into new studios at MediaCityUK in Salford Quays during Autumn 2011. The new development houses all departments previously based at New Broadcasting House alongside BBC Children's, BBC Sport, BBC Radio 5 Live, BBC Breakfast, BBC Learning and BBC Future Media departments and services, creating the biggest broadcast operation outside London. As part of the move, New Broadcasting House was sold off to Reality Estates Ltd for £10 million in April 2011.

In addition to their headquarters, BBC North West has local radio stations and news bureaux located in Liverpool and Blackburn and a district office in Chester.

== See also ==
- BBC English Regions
