= New Broadcasting House =

New Broadcasting House may refer to these BBC buildings in England:

- Broadcasting House in London
- New Broadcasting House, Manchester
