= Granada Studios =

Television studio complex in Manchester, England

Manchester Studios (All Studios)
- Granada Studios
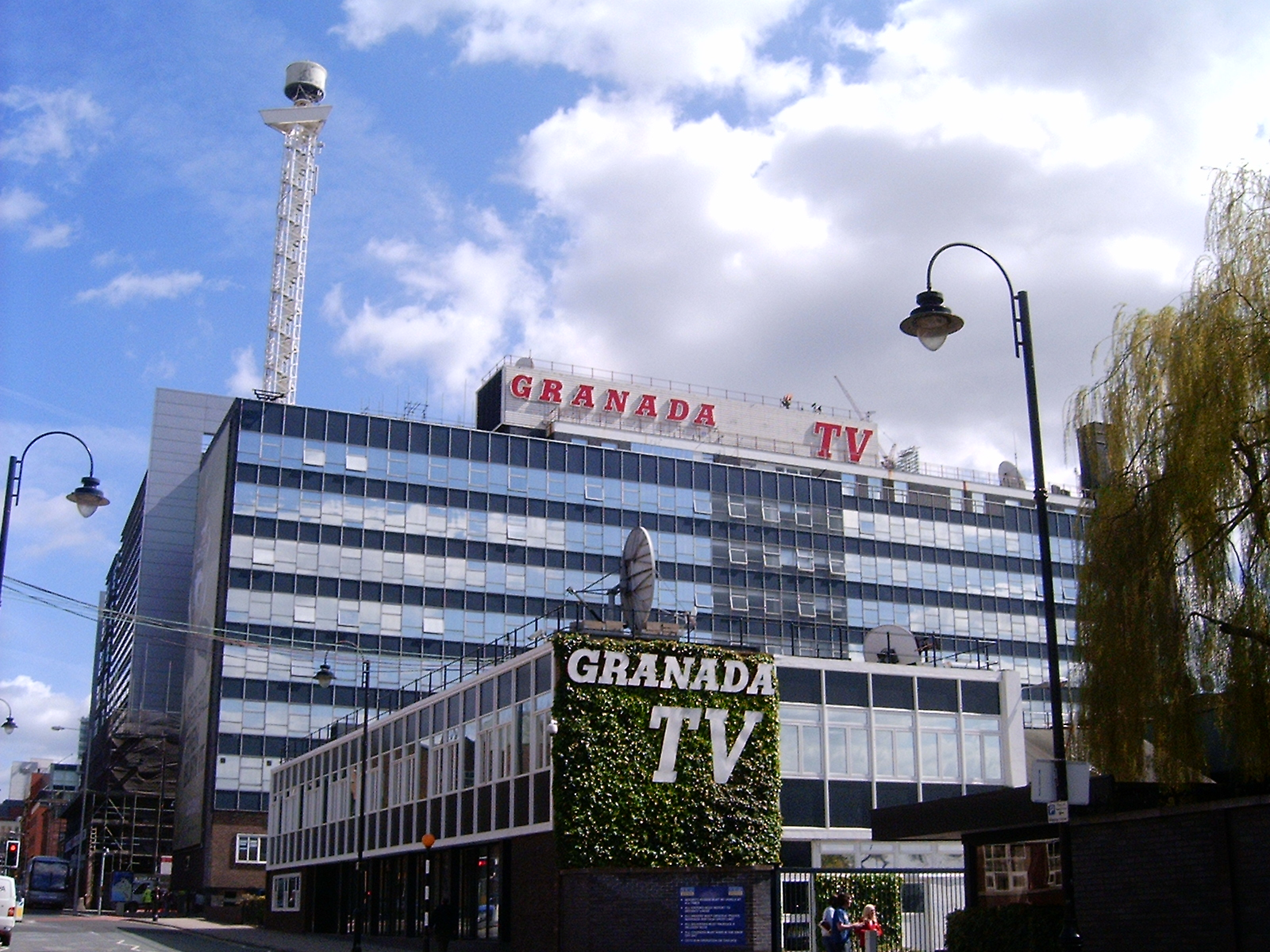
- Granada House with the original two-storey studios in the foreground pictured in 2006. The broadcasting tower and the red Granada TV logo on Granada House have since been removed.
- Former names: The Manchester Studios Granada (1956–1971); 3SixtyMedia Studios (2000–2013)
- Alternative names: Manchester Studios; All Studios Manchester

General information
- Type: Events Venue; Television studios
- Location: Manchester, United Kingdom, Quay Street; Manchester; M60 9EA
- Coordinates: 53.478879°N 2.255808°W
- Current tenants: All Studios
- Construction started: 1954
- Completed: 1962
- Inaugurated: 3 May 1956 (first broadcast)
- Renovated: 1987 (for Granada Studios Tour); 2006 (to Bonded Warehouse)
- Renovation cost: £3m (1987)
- Owner: Allied London and Manchester City Council
- Landlord: Allied London (All Studios)

Design and construction
- Architect: Ralph Tubbs
- Other designers: Sidney Bernstein

Granada Studios was a television studio complex and events venue on Quay Street in Manchester, England, with the facility to broadcast live and recorded television programmes. The studios were the headquarters of Granada Television from 1956 to 2013. After a period of closure, five of the six studio spaces reopened in 2018. The studios are the oldest operating purpose-built television studios in the United Kingdom, pre-dating BBC Television Centre by four years.

They were previously home to the world's longest-running serial drama, Coronation Street, as well as other long-running shows such as the quiz show University Challenge and the current affairs documentary series World in Action. As well as being the oldest television studios in the United Kingdom, the studios also held the Beatles' first television performance in 1962 and the first general election debate in 2010.

Until 2010, the main building, Granada House, had a red neon "Granada TV" sign on the roof, which was a landmark for rail passengers travelling from the west into Manchester city centre. A broadcasting tower was erected at the behest of Sidney Bernstein to give the studios an embellished and professional appearance. The three largest studios each covered over 4,500 square feet (420 m^{2}).

The studios were managed by ITV Studios and BBC Resources through a joint venture company, 3SixtyMedia from 2000 until 2013. After a dip in production during the early 2000s, the studios underwent a revival from 2009 until their closure. Countdown moved to Manchester from the Leeds Studios in 2009 and the facility had numerous new commissions including The Chase, Divided, Take Me Out and High Stakes.

The studios closed in 2013, and ITV Granada and ITV Studios moved to Dock10's studios at MediaCityUK in Salford Quays. Later that same year, the Granada Studios was sold for £26 million to Allied London and Manchester City Council. Allied London's initial plans for the site involved transforming the studios into residential space. However, plans were changed in 2017 to maintain the studio complex due to demand, and most studio spaces were reopened in 2018. Although there were calls to preserve the old Coronation Street exterior set, it was demolished as part of redevelopment work in 2017. Other areas knocked down were Studio 4 and the remaining Granada Studios Tour entrance. The studios' former office block, Granada House is being converted into a hotel and office space.

== History ==
After Granada secured the contract for broadcasting to the north of England on weekdays, the company built a television studio complex while BBC Manchester and ABC (originally Granada's weekend counterpart) respectively converted a former church/film studio and a cinema in the city for television use. The transition for the other broadcasters was that new areas were required for transmission facilities. Granada bypassed these problems by creating entirely new studios.

Sidney Bernstein chose its base for northern operations from Leeds, Liverpool and Manchester. Granada executive Victor Peers believed Manchester was the preferred choice even before Granada executives, Peers, Denis Forman, Reg Hammans and Sidney Bernstein, toured possible locations. One site was identified by Hammans in Leeds and three were found in Manchester which convinced Bernstein to explore further. Two sites were deemed expensive, and another in Salford Quays was rejected by Bernstein as inadequate. A site on Quay Street in Manchester city centre owned by Manchester City Council was bought for £82,000. Part of the Manchester and Salford Junction Canal, which linked the River Irwell to the Rochdale Canal from 1839 to 1922, ran in tunnel underneath the site.

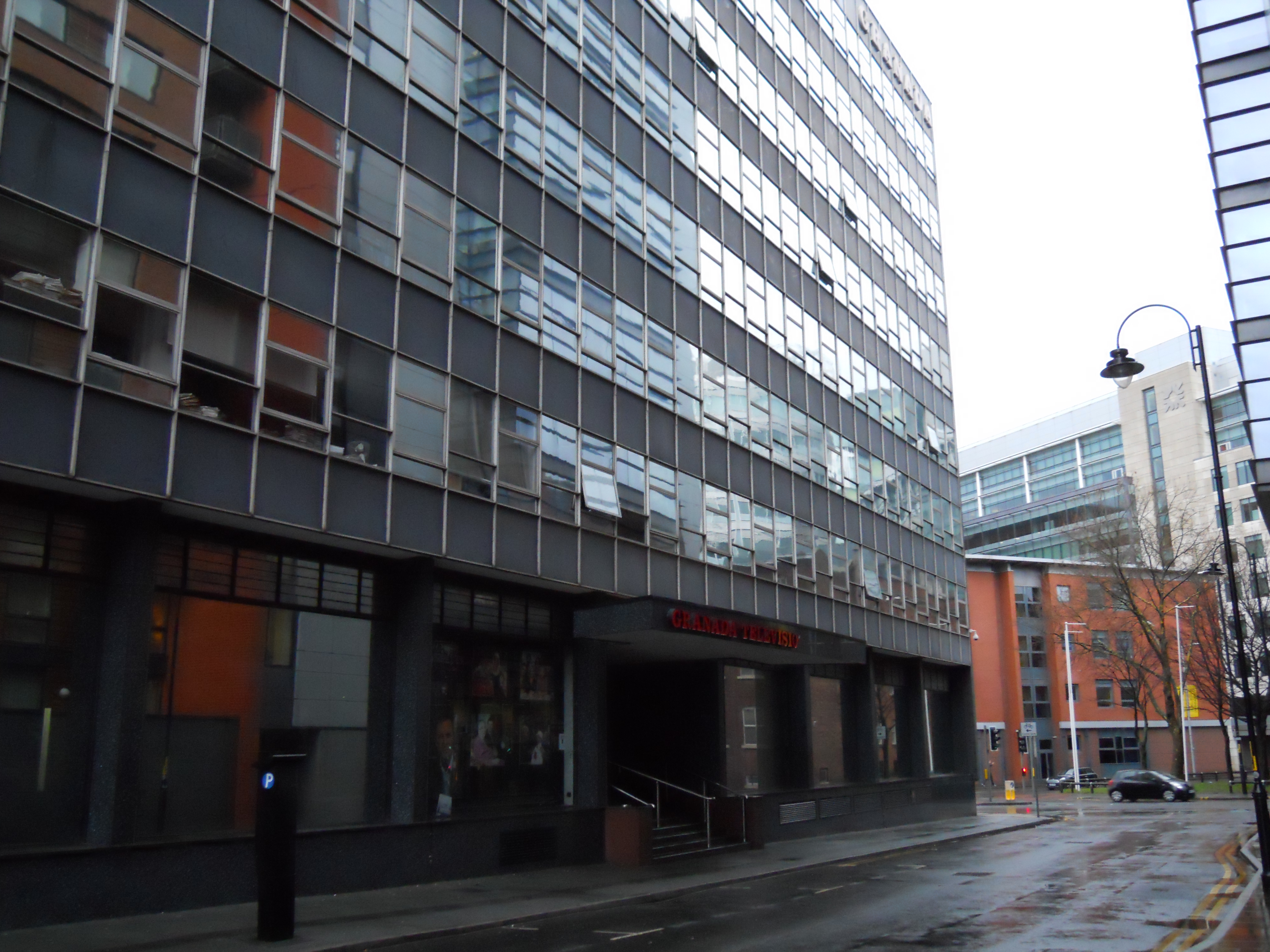
The Granada Studios main entrance

=== Architecture ===
The studios were designed by Ralph Tubbs, but Sidney Bernstein was instrumental in influencing designs and giving regular plan briefings. Bernstein was believed to have some architectural knowledge despite no experience or formal training, and was referred to as a "genial tyrant" by Granada producer Jeremy Isaacs for his influence in many decisions at Granada. In his memoirs, Forman wrote: "Anyone who witnessed Sidney at work in one of these sessions had to acknowledge his practical genius as an architect" as Bernstein lectured and demonstrated his plans for the studios to colleagues. Forman wrote that Tubbs looked "sometimes enthusiastic, sometimes disconsolate" during Bernstein's lecture briefings.

The logo which adorned the building was in a period font and remained in position from 1961 until 2010. Bernstein, keen to save money, had the studios built in a modular, sequential cycle – so new facilities were not built unless there was demand. This led to a jumbled appearance as the company expanded and renovated the site which encompassed a bonded warehouse built in the Victorian era.

The original studios were in a two-storey building on Quay Street. Bernstein stipulated in 1956 the company needed the bare minimum of studio space and was unwilling to invest in facilities that would rarely be used. This was the reason construction took from 1954 to 1962 and the "save money at all costs" mantra was reflective of Bernstein's business plan. Facilities expanded and a tower block was built next and studios expanded over time. From time to time, as extra production, rehearsal or office space was temporarily required, various adjacent buildings were annexed. These included warehouses on the opposite side of Water Street, the buildings between Quay Street and New Quay Street and the old school premises directly opposite the tower block.

=== Renovation ===
In 2000, the Granada Studios were taken over by 3SixtyMedia, a joint venture between Granada Television and BBC Manchester. Granada produced many programmes for the BBC such as University Challenge, The Royle Family and What The Papers Say and the link allowed the BBC use of the three large studios compared with one at New Broadcasting House. Production on programmes normally filmed at Studio A (which was subsequently mothballed but later reused to high demand) transferred to Granada Studios such as A Question of Sport.

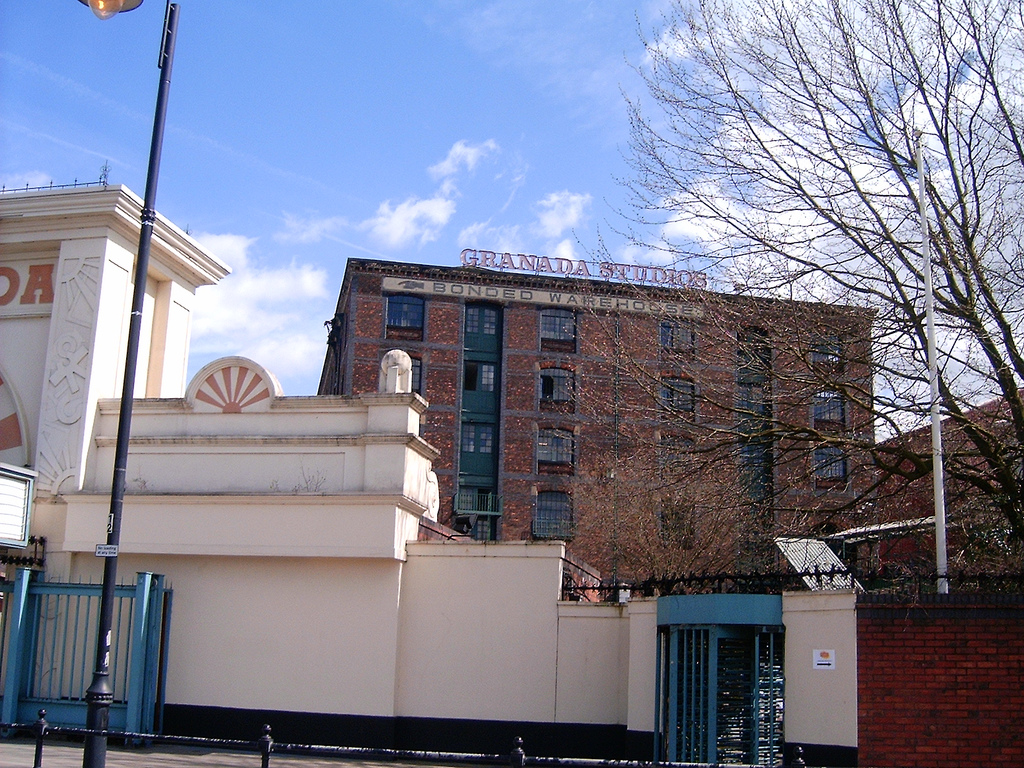
The bonded warehouse located next to Granada Studios. It is currently the filming location of Dragons' Den.

In 2002, the studio's reception area was moved from the eastern end of the tower block off Atherton Street, to the western end inside the compound so visitors passed through a secure area before accessing the non-public reception. The old reception area became unused. Granada unveiled plans to move into the bonded warehouse adjacent to Granada House in 2003. One of the four studios would be decommissioned as part of the move. This plan was postponed as plans for the BBC to move production to Manchester emerged.

Asbestos was found at the studios in October 2002, but not removed until spring 2006 costing thousands of pounds. The renovation meant programmes such as Mastermind and An Audience with Coronation Street were moved to The Leeds Studios and The London Studios respectively. In 2006, the 21 acre studio facility employed approximately 1,200 people.

After the BBC selected MediaCityUK as its new operating base in Greater Manchester, Granada progressed its £18m move to the bonded warehouse. About 800 office employees moved to the renovated warehouse, leaving 400 employees in the Granada building which houses three studios.

The iconic "Granada TV" sign on Manchester skyline, remained in place on the roof and sides of the buildings until September 2010 despite rebranding and the merger between Granada and Carlton. A safety check revealed the signs, that had been in place since the 1950s, were severely corroded and unsafe. They were removed from the penthouse suite in October 2010. Other signs remain on the side of the tower and on either side of the small building on Quay Street. A large ITV logo by the entrance had been placed next to the gate until 2016, when it was removed and replaced with a sign reading 'Old Granada Studios'.

=== Relocation ===
Despite its iconic status, Granada House has been described as a "1960s nightmare" by staff.

The merger between Granada plc and Carlton Communications to form ITV plc created speculation that the Quay Street complex would be sold. In 2004, a plan emerged for the production centre to be sold for development and the regional news centre and staff moved into the bonded warehouse in the complex. Production would move to Yorkshire Television's Leeds Studios, and other centres including independent facilities.

A 2003 article in The Daily Telegraph estimated the plot of land on which the Granada House building stands could sell for £15m, a speculative figure considering the economic situation in 2011.

The company negotiated with Peel Holdings with a view to relocating to Trafford Wharf, next to the Imperial War Museum North and the MediaCityUK development. The proposal meant the outdoor Coronation Street set would need to be relocated, and plans to create a media hub at Quay Street abandoned. The discussions continued for many years but in March 2009, Granada reported that due to the poor financial climate, it would remain at Quay Street "for the foreseeable future". Talks resumed in January 2010 after a change of management at ITV plc and Granada announced on 16 December 2010 that it would move production and ancillary staff to the Orange Building in the MediaCityUK complex to produce Granada Reports and production of Coronation Street would take place at a facility across the Manchester Ship Canal in Trafford Park on Trafford Wharf. The new facility, which opened in early 2014, has two large studios with production units, set storage, dressing rooms, space for interior sets and a new outdoor set.

The studios initially closed in June 2013, and ITV Granada and ITV Studios moved to Dock10, MediaCityUK in Salford Quays and Trafford Quays. Later that same year, the site was sold for £26 million to Allied London and Manchester City Council.

=== Post-closure ===
In 2012, a planning application was made to list some parts of the studios. This included the Coronation Street building and the Granada House building. The plan was however rejected. The bonded warehouse to the west of the studio complex is already listed.

A set of The Crystal Maze Live Experience opened in the former Stage 2, previously used by Coronation Street, in April 2017.

=== Reopening as All Studios / Enterprise City / Old Granada Studios ===
Four of the studios on site were reopened by Allied London, under the name of All Studios in 2018. The site is also advertised under the name of Old Granada Studios. The four studios which are part of the main complex, Studios 2, 6, 8 & 12, are due to be retained, with the former Studio 4 (by then part of the building's reception area) having been demolished as of January 2019. Work started on removing the old equipment from the galleries in February 2018 to install new production facilities.

It incorporates part of the Enterprise City project, which also includes co-working facilities, a cinema (Everyman Manchester St. John's) and a Soho House hotel.

The site has been used to film Dragons' Den since 2018, using flyaway equipment in the galleries and also some scenes for Peaky Blinders. The studio space also hosts events and has hosted concerts.

== Granada Studios Tour ==
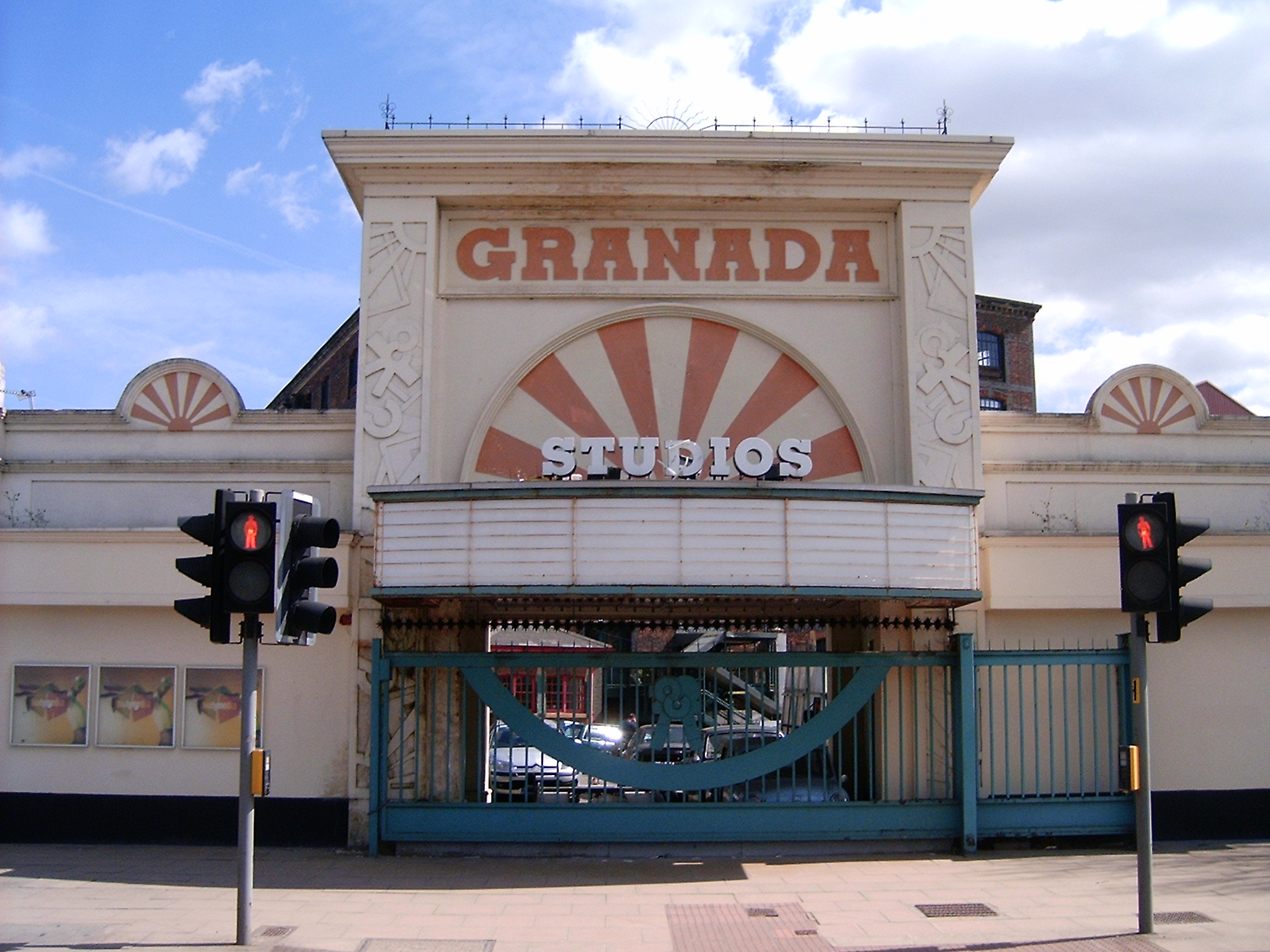
The Granada Studios Tour entrance in 2006

The Granada Studios Tour operated from 1989 to 1999 and gave the public the opportunity to visit the Coronation Street set and explore other Granada productions. Although such theme parks based on television and film had been successful in the United States, the idea of such a scheme was unprecedented for a British television company. John Williams, head of studio operations at Granada, promoted the project to provide a new revenue stream for Granada, the only television company to embark on such a venture. The park featured a replica of No. 10 Downing Street, and visitors were shown how television is produced, had the opportunity to present a weather forecast and learned about special effects. The main feature of the tour was the set of Coronation Street, which allowed visitors access to the street.

One film based attraction was Motion Master. This started visitors off seated in a 1930 style cinema showing a very short black and white film. You then walked into a modern cinema which put you into a space ship chasing an opponent. The seats moved in synchronisation with the film, tilting and rising/falling as the ship flew.

In 1997, Granada built Skytrak, a "flying roller-coaster" which tilted riders forward as the ride progressed. Skytrak, an uncomfortable ride, was considered a failure and was plagued by mechanical unreliability. Nevertheless, it was the first roller-coaster of its type in the world.

The tour was initially popular, attracting 5.5 million visits between 1988 and 1999, but the attraction fell into disrepair as Granada concentrated on other priorities such as the launch of OnDigital (ITV Digital) in the late 1990s. Visitor numbers waned and the tour closed in 1999. The entrance to the park remained until 2019 when it was demolished; the Granada Studios Tour sign was removed during this period.

== Studios ==
=== Live studios ===
The studio complex comprised the original building and office block accessible from Quay Street, with other studios around the complex. Granada's studios were originally all numbered evenly to falsely embellish the size of the complex and make Granada Television appear to be a large broadcaster. Granada Studios main studios – Studios 2, 6, 8 and 12 – were housed in Granada House, and it is these which have been retained as of January 2019. The original studios at the Granada Studios were:

- Studio 1 – An in-vision continuity studio, used by many of the In-vision continuity announcers for junctions and the late night news from the early 1980s, mothballed in about 1998 and became a storage cupboard.
- Studio 2 – A 3,218 square feet (299.0 m^{2}) studio, formerly home to Granada Reports and the northern operations of ITV News (among the first operations to move to Dock10, MediaCityUK, on 25 March 2013). Retained for ALL Studios.
- Studio 4 – One of the original studios created as part of the first phase TVC building, later taken out of service and then part of the reception. Demolished as part of the 2018 renovation works. The Beatles' first TV performance was broadcast from this studio in October 1962.
- Studio 6 – A compact studio measuring 4,456 square feet (414.0 m^{2}). It was intended to be mothballed to reduce maintenance costs in 2003, but was reprieved after programme production increased (largely due to becoming home to The Jeremy Kyle Show). Retained for ALL Studios.
- Studio 8 – A medium-sized studio measuring 5,447 square feet (506.0 m^{2}) with a capacity of 240, historically has been used for filming quiz shows such as University Challenge. Retained for ALL Studios.
- Studio 10 – Not in the studio complex, Studio 10 was at the Chelsea Palace Theatre in London and used for interviews and filming acts outside Manchester. It was sold by Granada in the 1960s and demolished in 1966.
- Studio 12 – A large studio measuring 7,922 square feet (736.0 m^{2}) with a capacity of 524 is used for entertainment shows. The studio hosted the First Election Debate in 2010. Retained for ALL Studios.

In addition to the original studios, there are other studios located around the complex. The Breeze Garden Studio was located in the garden, south of the tower, and is 477 m^{2} (5,130 sq ft). It was originally built and used for programmes on Granada's satellite and cable channels and was later used for press shoots and some programmes on the now defunct ITV Play channel. It is now a marketing suite for the St. John's complex. The adjacent bonded warehouse was used for many years as offices and television production facilities.

=== Drama studios ===
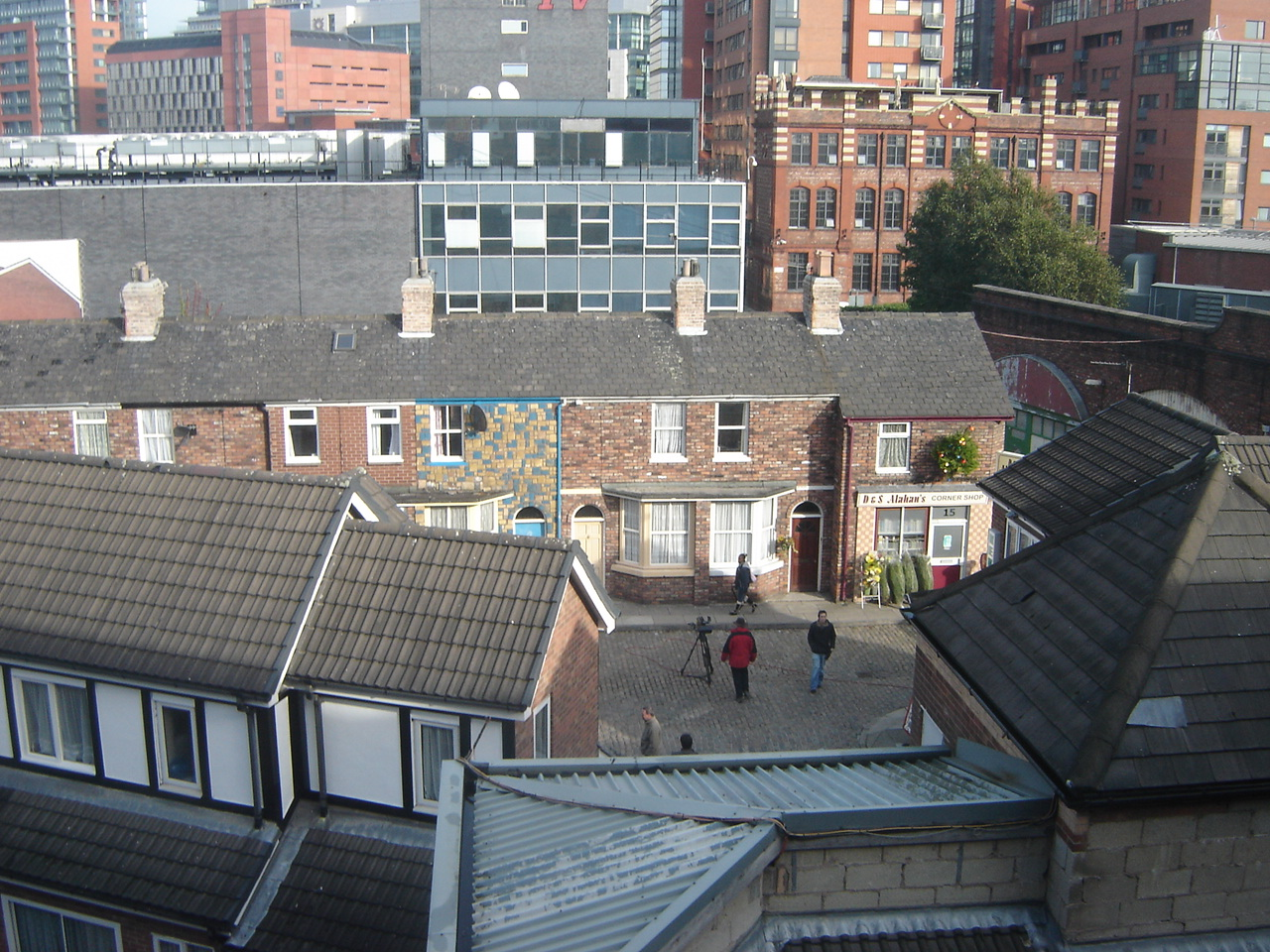
The Granada Studios backlot in 2007, featuring the Coronation Street set.

The Starlight Theatre was part of the Granada Studios Tour changed into two studios of 700 m^{2} (7,500 sq ft) and 424 m^{2} (4,560 sq ft). It was used for drama productions and late-night ITV Play programming. It is located in the southwest corner of the site. The Blue Shed which measures 1,577 m^{2} (16,970 sq ft) is not available for public hire.

Post production facilities were located in the tower block as were green rooms and other guest facilities. The site contained the former set of Coronation Street on the south of the site, and the bonded warehouse on the south west.

=== Granada backlot – Coronation Street set ===
Situated across Grape Street from the main studio building and adjacent to the bonded warehouse is the former Coronation Street set. This version of the set was first created in 1982, but was replaced in January 2014 by a new set at ITV's new facility in Trafford Wharf Road. It was mostly demolished to make way for outdoor filming and parking for production vehicles in early 2018.

== See also ==
- Media in Manchester
- Granada Television
- Granada plc
- Granada Studios Tour
- St John's Quarter
