= BBC Manchester =

BBC regional HQ in northwest England

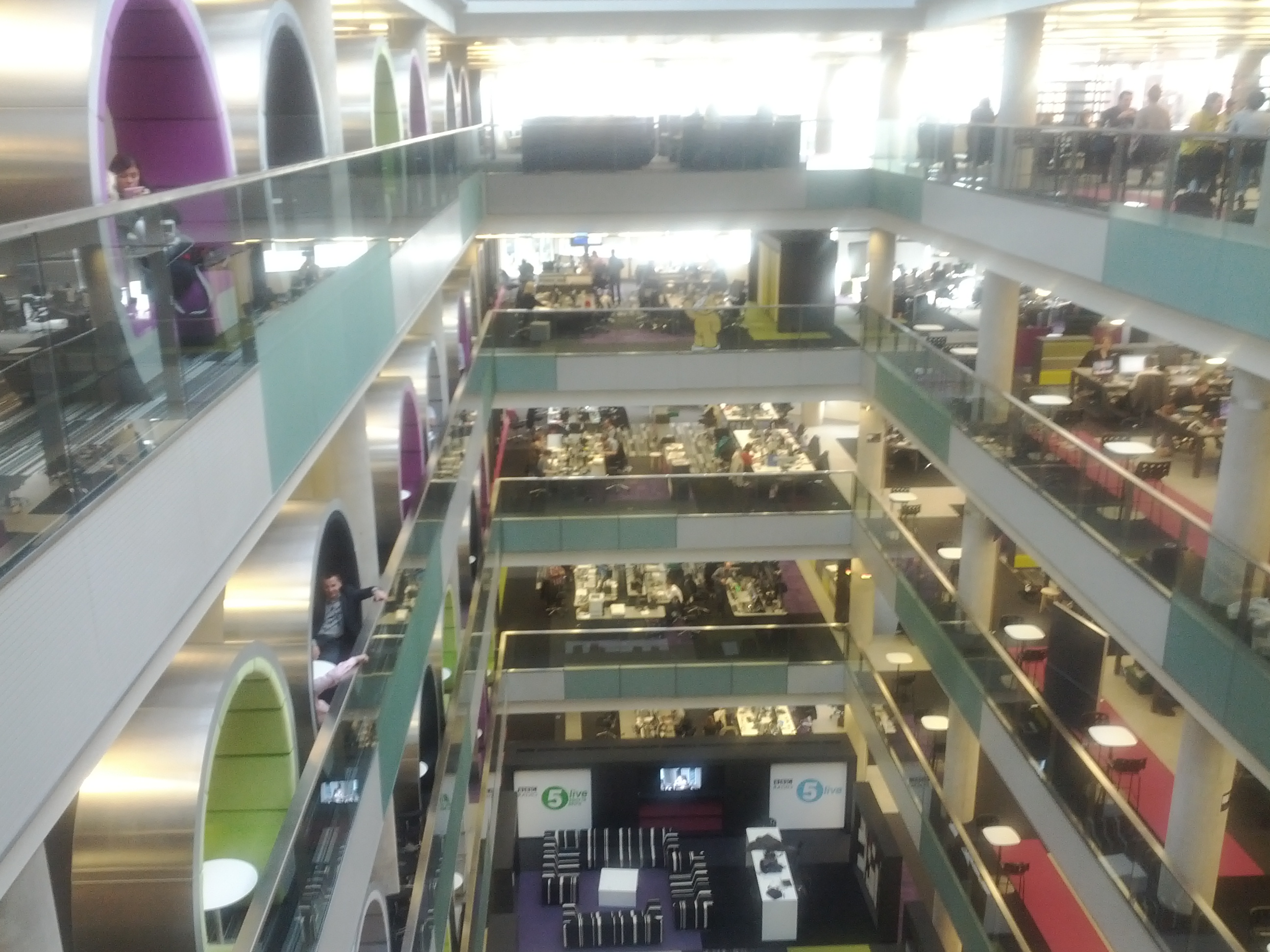
Quay House, part of the BBC presence at MediaCityUK

BBC Manchester (often known as BBC Salford) is the BBC's regional headquarters for the north west of England, the largest BBC region in the UK. BBC Manchester is a department of the BBC North Group division. The BBC considers the Manchester department as one of its three main national bases alongside London and Bristol, and has had a presence in the city since launching the 2ZY radio station in 1922. The BBC had its first studio outside London in 1954 when the corporation leased the Dickenson Road Studios. In 1967, the decision was taken to build a purpose-built BBC building in Manchester on Oxford Road which opened in 1976.

Manchester's television industry struggled during the early 2000s when Granada Television reduced operations in Manchester with the newly formed ITV opting to move operations to London which meant New Broadcasting House and Granada Studios were underused. BBC Television Centre in London, Granada Studios and New Broadcasting House in Manchester were all coming to the end of their operational span and the BBC decided to transfer more departments north, preferably to Manchester where they have been based for 90 years. The move would aim to boost the ailing Manchester media industry, lower operational costs compared to London and represent the north of England more proportionally.

The BBC decided on moving to MediaCityUK in Salford Quays, a short distance outside the city centre. BBC Manchester transferred from New Broadcasting House.

== History ==
=== Early studios ===
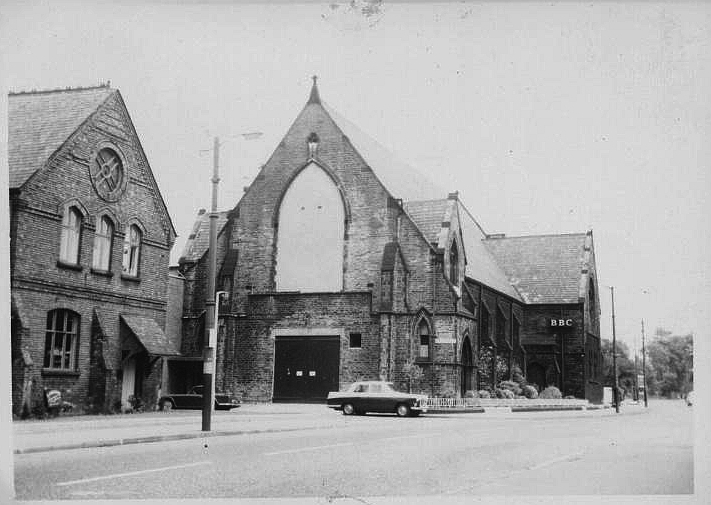
Dickenson Road Studios in Rusholme, the BBC's first television studio outside London

Manchester was home to the BBC's first television studio outside London in 1954 with the acquisition of Dickenson Road Studios in Rusholme, which was a converted church. The BBC formed BBC Manchester in the 1950s and the Manchester department bought the studios from Mancunian Films. The BBC formed another production centre, BBC Piccadilly Studios in Manchester city centre in 1957 for local programming.

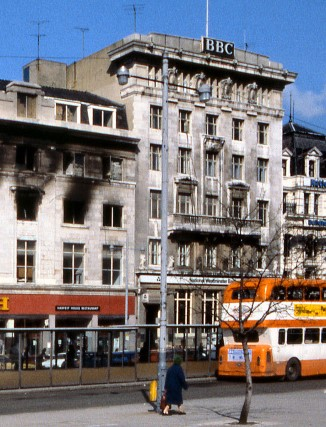
BBC Piccadilly Studios in May 1979

The Dickenson Road studios were the original base for Top of the Pops from the first edition broadcast on New Year's Day 1964 from Studio A. DJs Jimmy Savile and Alan Freeman presented in a week when The Beatles, with "I Want to Hold Your Hand", that week's number one. A Mancunian model, Samantha Juste, was the regular "disc girl". Local photographer Harry Goodwin was hired to provide shots of non-appearing artists, and also to provide backdrops for the chart rundown.

In 1972, local broadcaster Stuart Hall hosted It's a Knockout. Stuart Hall remarked that the programme was like "the Olympic Games with custard pies". The programme was revived under BBC Manchester's ownership with viewing figures surging from 100,000 to 15 million.

The Dickenson Road facility remained in use until 1975 when the BBC moved to New Broadcasting House.

=== New Broadcasting House ===
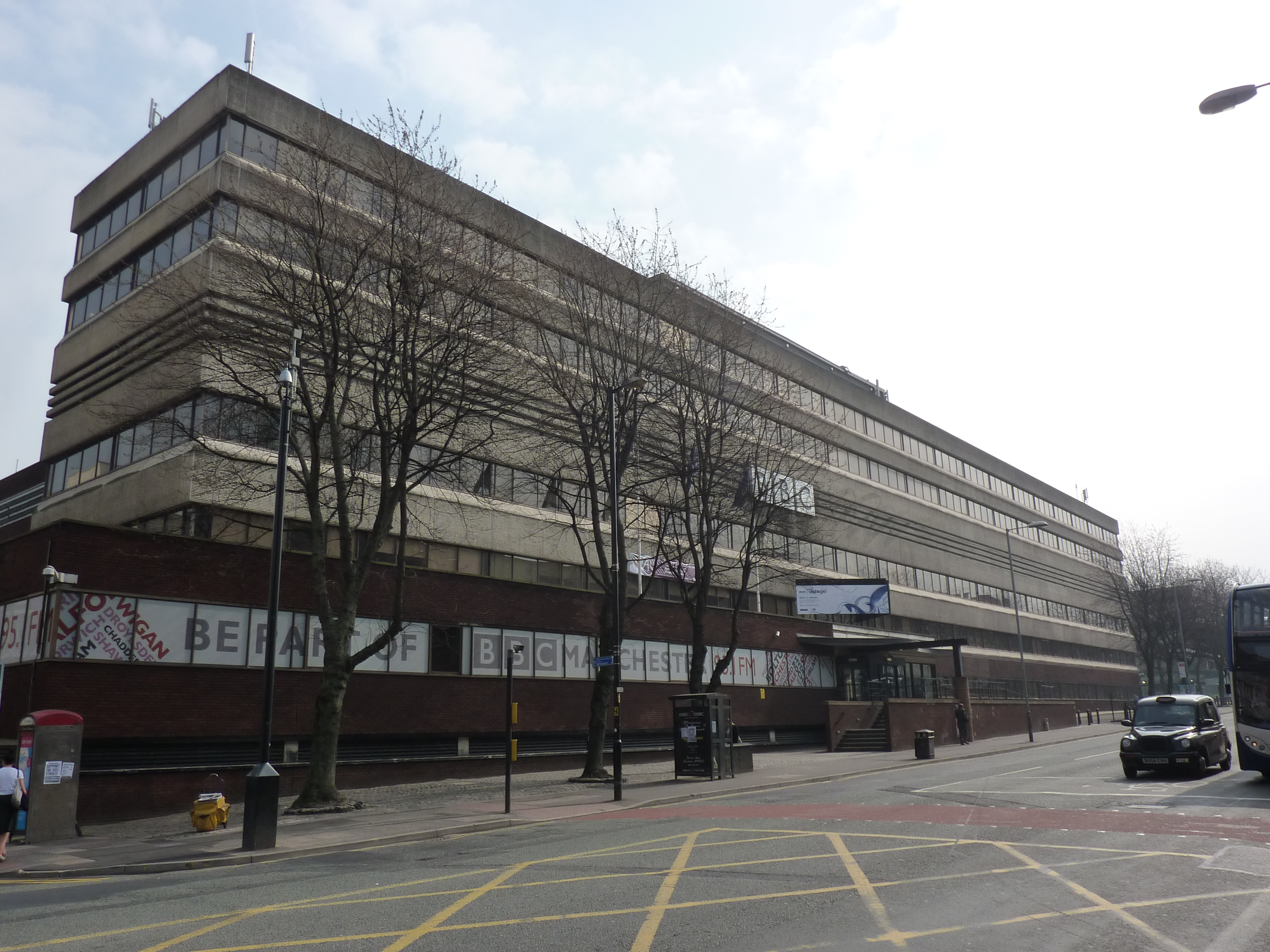
New Broadcasting House, home of BBC Manchester from 1975 until 2011

From 1975, BBC Manchester's base was New Broadcasting House on Oxford Road in Manchester city centre.

New Broadcasting House had one small studio and one large studio, Studio A which was equipped for live programming and recording drama programmes. Studio A underwent a major £6 million expansion in 1989 which increased the studio's volume by 80%. Upon completion it was the largest BBC studio outside London at 6,204 ft.

The early 2000s were tough for BBC Manchester and the diminishing Granada Television as a result of the ITV takeover in 2004 affected the level of programme production. 3SixtyMedia Studios at Granada Studios and New Broadcasting House only had enough filming work to operate two studios, despite having five available. New programmes such as Life on Mars, Dragons' Den and Waterloo Road were all commissioned soon after and Manchester is now Europe's second largest creative industry in Europe. BBC Manchester was the base for programmes such as It's a Knockout and Red Dwarf, while programmes such as A Question of Sport originated there.

In 2003, as BBC Pacific Quay, The Mailbox and BBC White City were being redeveloped it was touted the New Broadcasting House site could be redeveloped but this idea was eventually shelved to create a new purpose-built television studios. BBC Manchester transferred its base to MediaCityUK in 2011 which is located two miles west of New Broadcasting House in Salford Quays. New Broadcasting House was demolished in 2013, and the land is now being developed into high rise accommodation and office buildings under the moniker 'Circle Square'.

=== Granada Studios ===
The BBC previously owned 20% of Granada Studios through 3SixtyMedia, a joint venture between the BBC and ITV Studios. The venture aimed to cut costs for the BBC and Granada. This also gave the BBC greater use of the Granada Studios, enabling the BBC to reduce production in Oxford Road’s Studio A, and instead use the three larger studios at Granada’s site

In 2013, TV production at Granada Studios ceased, with productions transferring to MediaCityUK. The studios were sold to Manchester City Council and property developer Allied London.

== Regional output ==
As with all other BBC regions, BBC Manchester is responsible for providing local radio services and the regional television news broadcasts on BBC One during the times when all regions opt out of the network feed to provide their own local news programming, which in the BBC Manchester area is called North West Tonight.

BBC North West Tonight is broadcast from MediaCity in Manchester, and is the regional news for;

- Greater Manchester
- Merseyside
- Lancashire
- Cheshire
- Isle of Man
- Southern Cumbria
- North West of Derbyshire
- West of North Yorkshire
- Northern Staffordshire

BBC Radio Manchester also broadcasts from MediaCity which provides local radio to Greater Manchester, north-east Cheshire and north-west Derbyshire.

== BBC Manchester Big Screen ==
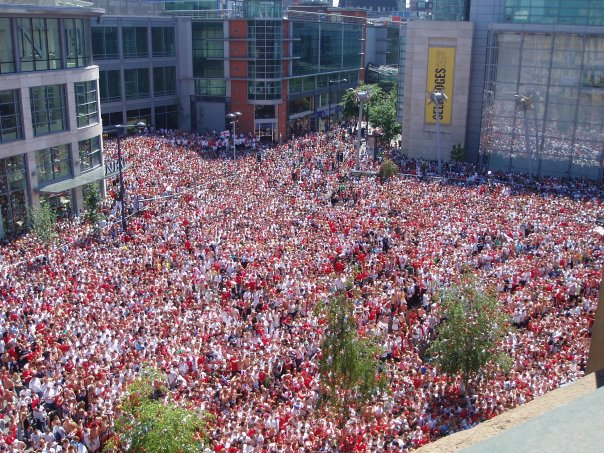
BBC Big Screen in Exchange Square, Manchester

The BBC's first Big Screen was erected in Manchester. The Screen became a permanent feature of Exchange Square in 2003 after a successful trial in Manchester during key events such as the 2002 Commonwealth Games, the Golden Jubilee in 2002 and the 2002 Football World Cup.

== See also ==
- BBC Birmingham
