= 3SixtyMedia =

Production and studio crewing company in the United Kingdom

- Company type: Joint venture
- Industry: Television
- Genre: Production company
- Founded: 2000
- Headquarters: Orange Tower; MediaCityUK; Salford Quays, Manchester, UK
- Owner: ITV Studios; BBC Studioworks
- Number of employees: 100
- Website: www.3sixtymedia.com

3SixtyMedia is a joint venture post production and studio crewing company, based at MediaCityUK in Salford Quays and co-owned by ITV Studios and BBC Studioworks. Formed in 2000, it was originally based at Granada Television's Quay Street headquarters and combined the studio and post production facilities and technical staff of both BBC Manchester and Granada, aiming to cut operating costs. As part of the venture, some programmes were recorded at the studios of both BBC Manchester (New Broadcasting House) and Granada Television (Granada Studios), such as A Question of Sport.

== Future ==
3SixtyMedia no longer manages studios, since programmes recorded in Manchester for the BBC, ITV and Channel 4 - such as University Challenge, Countdown and The Jeremy Kyle Show - now use the MediaCityUK studios, which are independently managed. Initially, the future of the company was unclear, following the move of both BBC North and ITV Granada to MediaCityUK. ITV Studios also moved production of Coronation Street to a new facility at Trafford Wharf, on the opposite side of the Quays to the main MediaCityUK site. 3SixtyMedia has however, kept its identity and re-focussed on supplying postproduction and media management services to ITV Studios and independent productions.

== See also ==
- ITV Granada
- BBC North
- Media in Manchester
