= Capitol Theatre, Manchester =

Former theatre and TV studios in England

Coordinates: 53°24′58.13″N 2°13′20.38″W

Capitol Theatre
- Horniman Theatre
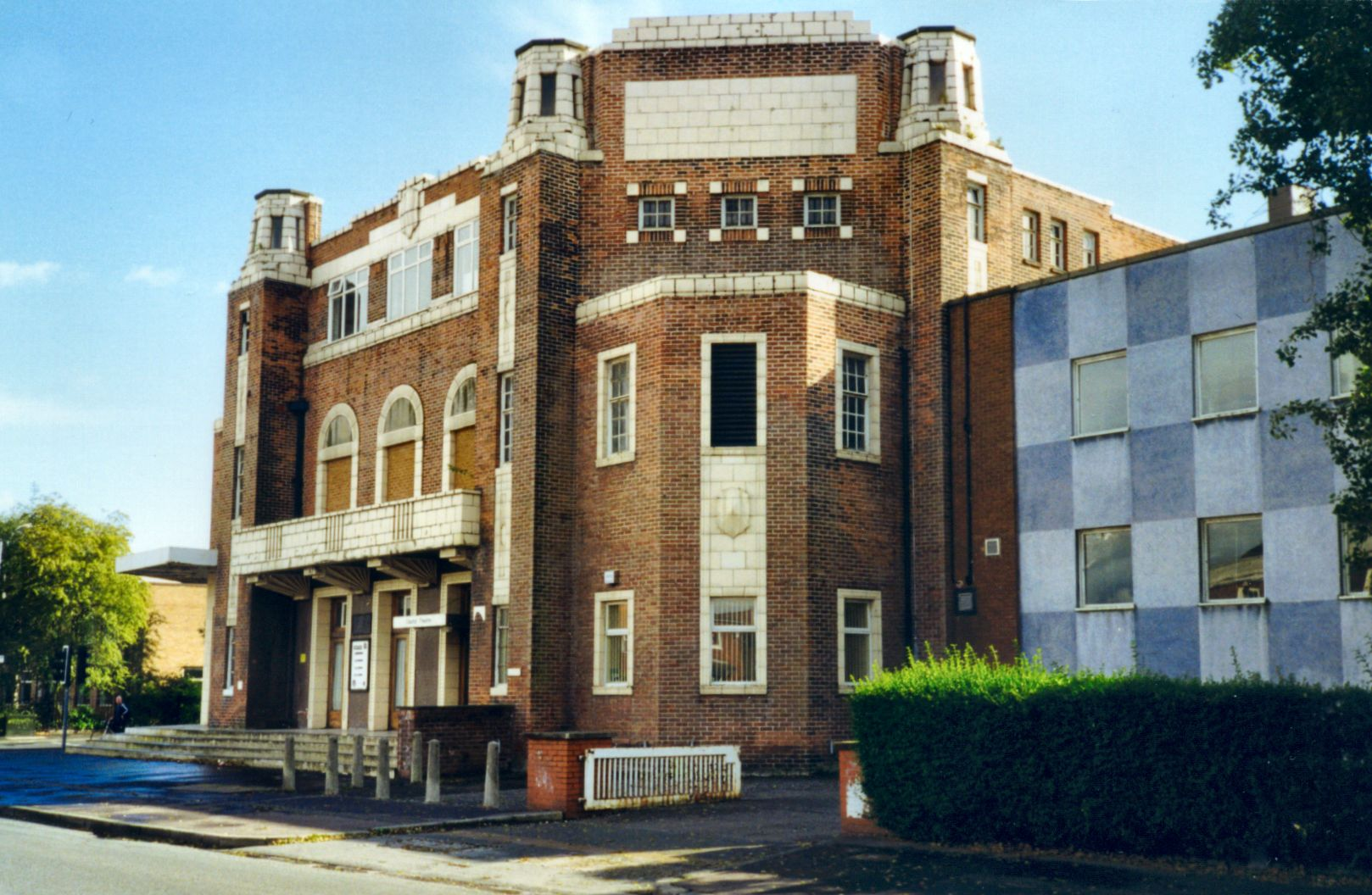
- Capitol Theatre during its time as the Manchester School of Theatre
- Interactive map of Capitol Theatre
- Address: School Lane, Didsbury; Manchester; United Kingdom

Construction
- Opened: 1931
- Closed: 1998

The Capitol Theatre was a cinema in Didsbury, Manchester later used as television studios by ITV contractor ABC Weekend TV from 1956 to 1968.

The building opened as a cinema in 1931, but was badly damaged by fire in April 1932 and was closed for repairs until August 1933. The cinema was equipped for the production of live shows, and was used for occasional pantomimes and amateur theatrical performances. In 1956 it was converted into television studios for ABC Weekend TV. Programmes such as Opportunity Knocks and Police Surgeon were made in the studios.

Following the merger of Associated Rediffusion and ABC to create Thames Television (on air from July 1968) the studios were leased to Yorkshire Television in 1967 for recording pre-launch programming whilst their own studios were being constructed and in 1970 was sold to Manchester Polytechnic and was the base for their theatre and television school from 1971. Renamed the Horniman Theatre, it staged performances by students of the college, including early performances by Julie Walters, Bernard Hill, and David Threlfall.

The theatre reverted to its original name in 1987, and the polytechnic was granted university status as "Manchester Metropolitan University" on 15 September 1992 under the provisions of the Further and Higher Education Act 1992.

As part of the university restructuring in 1997, the building was sold to a development company and demolished to make way for blocks of flats. The School of Theatre moved its faculty and performance space to the All Saints campus on Oxford Road, where there is now a new Capitol Theatre, a 140-seat studio space.
