= BBC North =

Operational business division of the BBC

Coordinates: 53.8058°N 1.5485°W

BBC North logo used since 2022

BBC North (Group) is an operational business division of the BBC.

It is also a brand that has been used by the BBC to mean:

- The large BBC North region, centred on Manchester, that was active from the late 1920s until 1968 and was based upon one of the four UK regional radio transmission stations.
- The BBC North region, centred on Leeds, that was active between 1968 and 2004 and which was split to form BBC Yorkshire and BBC Yorks & Lincs.
- The operational department called BBC North that combined the output of the BBC's northern regions between 1990 and 1996.
- The BBC North Group of major BBC departments that have already moved or are moving from London to MediaCityUK in Greater Manchester from 2011 onwards as part of the BBC North Project.

== BBC region 1920s–1968 ==
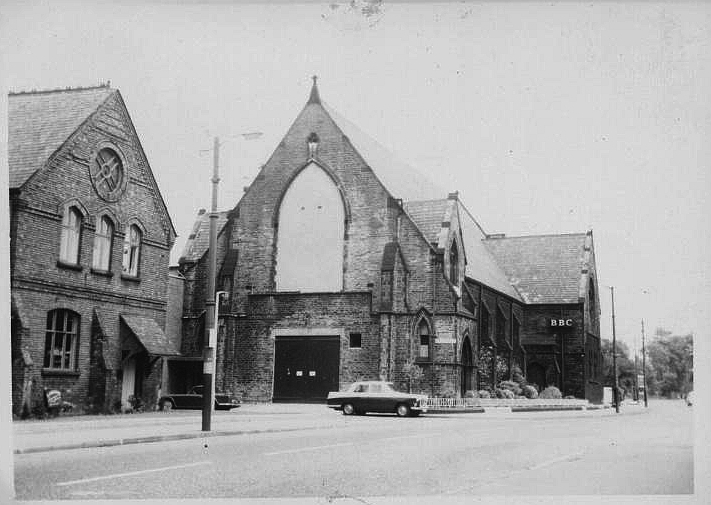
Dickenson Road Studios, Manchester

The first BBC North operation was a large region, based in Manchester and covering the areas now served by BBC North West, BBC North East and Cumbria, BBC Yorkshire and BBC Yorkshire and Lincolnshire. Regional radio broadcasting was largely based at a leased studio complex above a bank known as 'Old Broadcasting House' at Piccadilly Gardens in Manchester city centre. These studios became the base for radio output from the region in 1929. The BBC's first regional television studio, studio A, would be based elsewhere in the city – at a converted church on Dickenson Road in Rusholme, which opened in 1954 after being owned and operated by Mancunian Films.

Regional television news bulletins began from Piccadilly's studio N on 30 September 1957 and served the entire North of England. Two years later, the northern half of the region (the North East and Cumbria) began receiving its own TV news bulletins from Newcastle (BBC North East and Cumbria) while the two distinct areas either side of the Pennines continued to receive what eventually became Look North from Manchester until 22 March 1968. Regional radio output for this area continued on an opt-out of BBC Radio 4 until September 1980 (by which time, six BBC Local Radio stations had been set up to cover the North West & Yorkshire regions).

== BBC region 1968–2004 ==
=== Programmes ===
Based at the Broadcasting Centre at Woodhouse Lane in Leeds, BBC North was the production centre for regional television output, including the nightly news programme Look North and BBC Local Radio station BBC Radio Leeds.

=== History ===
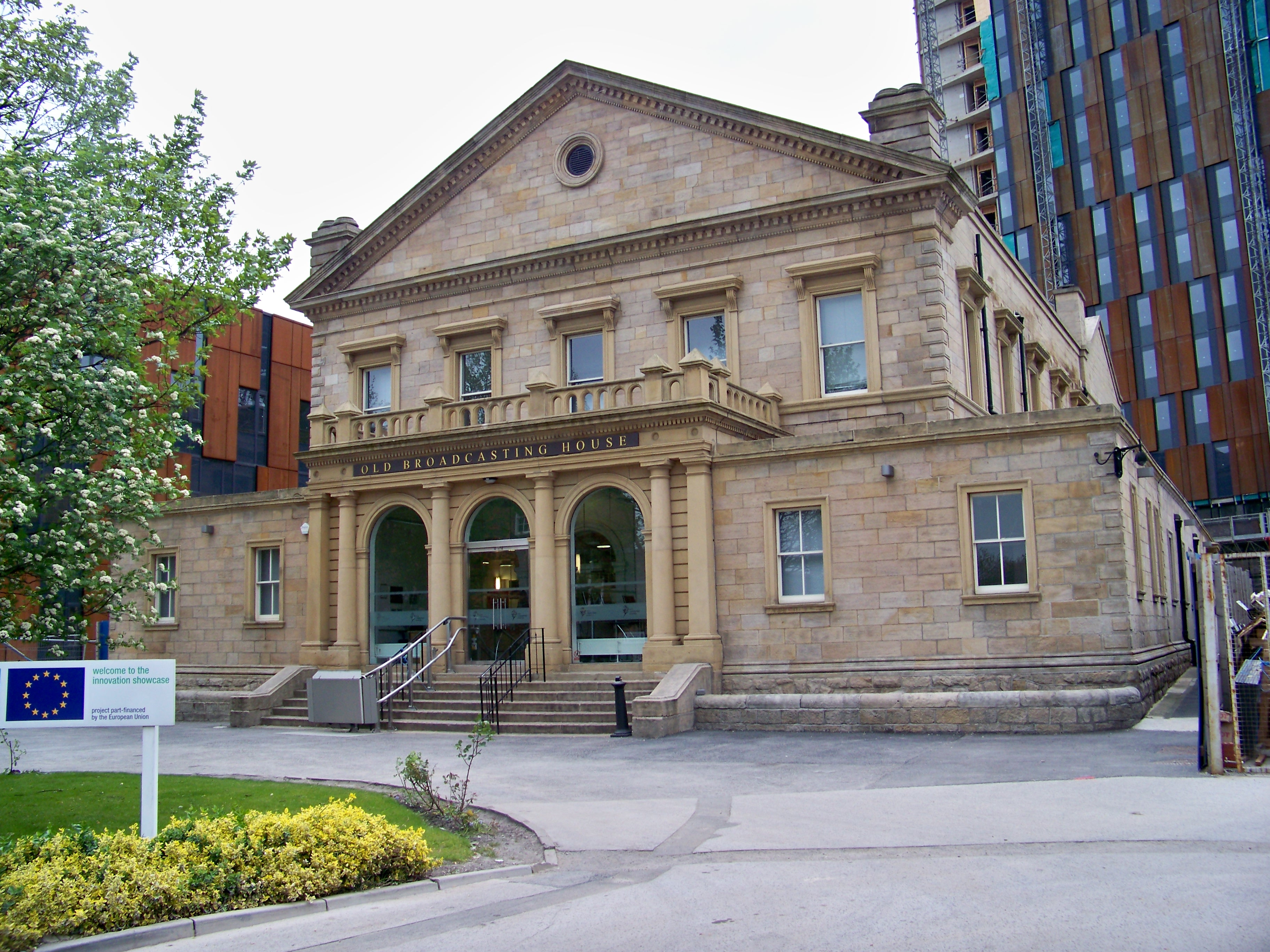
Old Broadcasting House, Leeds.

The Leeds island site went on air on 25 March 1968 as a response to the imminent opening of Yorkshire Television, the new ITV contractor based in Leeds serving the area east of the Pennines, formerly part of the Granada Television area. And in a similar manner to the impending ITV east-west Granada-Yorkshire split, the BBC divided the old North Region (based in Manchester) into BBC North West (Manchester) and the new BBC North (Leeds).

This enabled a separate edition of Look North to be produced, initially from All Souls in Blackman Lane - a church hall near Woodhouse Lane - using equipment from a redundant OB scanner plus "mobile" telecine and film processing vans (the latter obtained from BBC TV News in London). Until this time, BBC viewers here had only the Manchester edition of the regional opt-out to watch, just as on ITV, where Granada had been the only choice of regional news magazine programme for the entire Lancashire & Yorkshire viewing area. The launch of Yorkshire Television four months later would mark the launch of ITV's own regional news programme for the new region, Calendar.

Leeds was to have the third incarnation of the BBC programme called Look North; the others continued to be produced in Newcastle, another island site, and in Manchester, which was also the BBC Network Production Centre (NPC) for the north of England.

In 1974 the programme moved into a new colour studio equipped with EMI 2001 cameras in the newly built Broadcasting Centre adjacent to Broadcasting House, in Woodhouse Lane, where it remained for thirty years until the studio was demolished in 2004.

During 2001 an opt-out service was introduced for viewers in East Yorkshire and Lincolnshire, consisting of a news summary within the main 6:30pm edition of Look North and a full length late bulletin on weeknights. The 6:30pm opt-out was extended into a full length 30 minute programme in November 2002.

In June 2004, the BBC North region was fully split to form the BBC Yorkshire and North Midlands region and the BBC Yorkshire and Lincolnshire region. BBC Yorkshire and North Midlands is based in St. Peter's Square, Leeds, and is transmitted from Emley Moor and its associated relays, as well as by satellite from SES Astra 1N at 28.2 East on 10.803 GHz, SID 6441, Freesat EPG 966 to a population of around 4 million. BBC Yorkshire and Lincolnshire is based in Queen's Court in Hull and is transmitted from Belmont and its associated relays, as well as by satellite from SES Astra 1N at 28.2 East on 10,788 GHz V, SID 10303, Freesat EPG 967 to around 1.7 million.

== Operation 1990–1996 ==
Between 1990 and 1996, the three northern regions of BBC North West, BBC North East and BBC North merged their administration and managerial departments as a cost-saving measure. The new service was centred on New Broadcasting House in Manchester. The new service produced all of the regional programming, and all the regions used BBC North on-screen branding, but still retained the unique identity of the regional news programmes. The operation also became head of the Network Production Centre at Manchester, making BBC North one of the biggest producers of network television outside London. The regions were separated in 1996 in a drive to serve the regions better, which could not be done from Manchester alone.

== BBC North Group (2004–present) ==
BBC North Group is one of eight major operational divisions of the BBC, the others being BBC Television, BBC Radio, BBC News Group, BBC Executive Board, BBC Management Board, BBC Digital and BBC Finance & Business, and comprises a number of BBC departments (25 in all), operating at the 200-acre (81 ha) development MediaCityUK built by the Peel Group, as part of the "BBC North Project", also called "Out of London". This group is directly answerable to the Director-General's Office and the BBC Trust. The group contains BBC Sport, along with CBBC, CBeebies, BBC Learning, BBC Breakfast, BBC Radio 5 Live, BBC Radio 5 Sports Extra, BBC Philharmonic, BBC Research & Development, BBC Digital, BBC R & D (North Lab), BBC Radio 4 (programme production), BBC Radio 6 Music (programme production), BBC Radio Manchester, BBC Manchester network production centre and BBC North West.

The project began in 2006 when Salford was named as the chosen location by the Board of Governors and in 2007 the go-ahead was given to the project by the BBC Trust.

The day-to-day operation of production and broadcasting at MediaCityUK is now operated as BBC North for the BBC.

== See also ==
- BBC English Regions
- MediaCityUK
