= New Broadcasting House, Manchester =

Former television complex in Manchester

New Broadcasting House
- BBC Manchester Studios; NBH
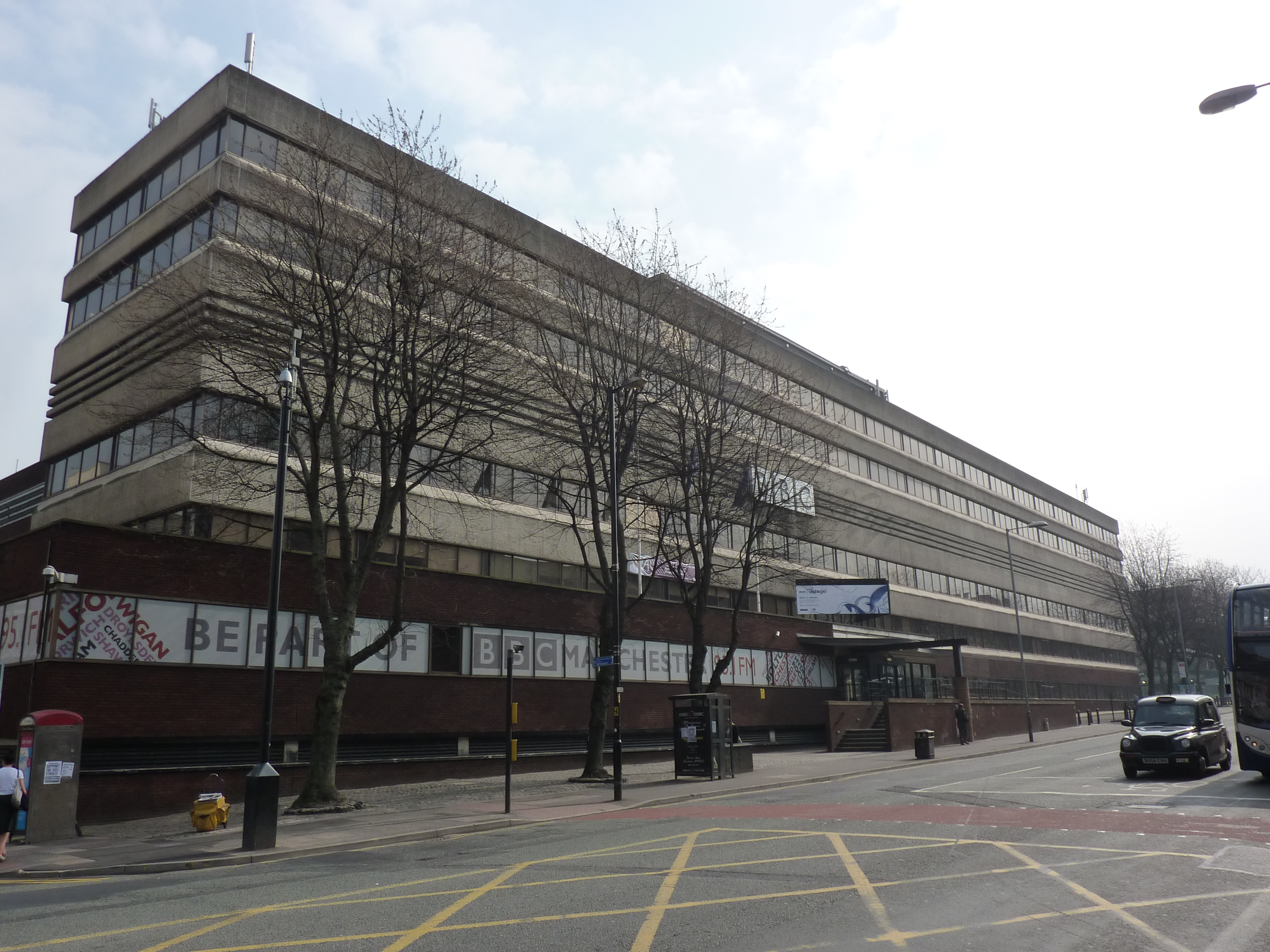
- Interactive map of the New Broadcasting House area

General information
- Type: Television and radio studios
- Architectural style: Precast concrete panels, with bronze-tinted solar-heat-rejecting glass
- Location: Oxford Road, Manchester, M60 1SJ
- Coordinates: 53.47312°N 2.23925°W
- Completed: July 1975
- Inaugurated: 18 June 1976
- Demolished: 2012
- Landlord: BBC

Dimensions
- Other dimensions: 5.4 acres (1.66 ha)

Technical details
- Structural system: Reinforced concrete structure
- Floor count: 6
- Floor area: 30,400 m (99,738 ft)

Design and construction
- Architect: R. A. Sparks
- Architecture firm: BBC Architectural and Civil Engineering Department
- Structural engineer: Ove Arup
- Services engineer: Haden Young
- Civil engineer: D. G. Nimmy
- Other designers: Acousticians – Sandy Brown Associates; Mechanical Services – Building Design Partnership
- Quantity surveyor: Bare, Leaning, and Bare
- Main contractor: Higgs and Hill

New Broadcasting House (NBH) was the BBC's North West England headquarters on Oxford Road in Chorlton-on-Medlock, Manchester. The studios housed BBC Manchester, BBC North West, the BBC Philharmonic Orchestra and the BBC Religion and Ethics department. It was known as a Network Production Centre, the others being in Birmingham (the now also demolished Pebble Mill Studios) and Broadcasting House, Bristol.

New Broadcasting House was vacated during autumn 2011 when the departments were relocated to MediaCityUK outside of central Manchester in Salford Quays. The building was demolished in 2012.

== Architecture and construction ==
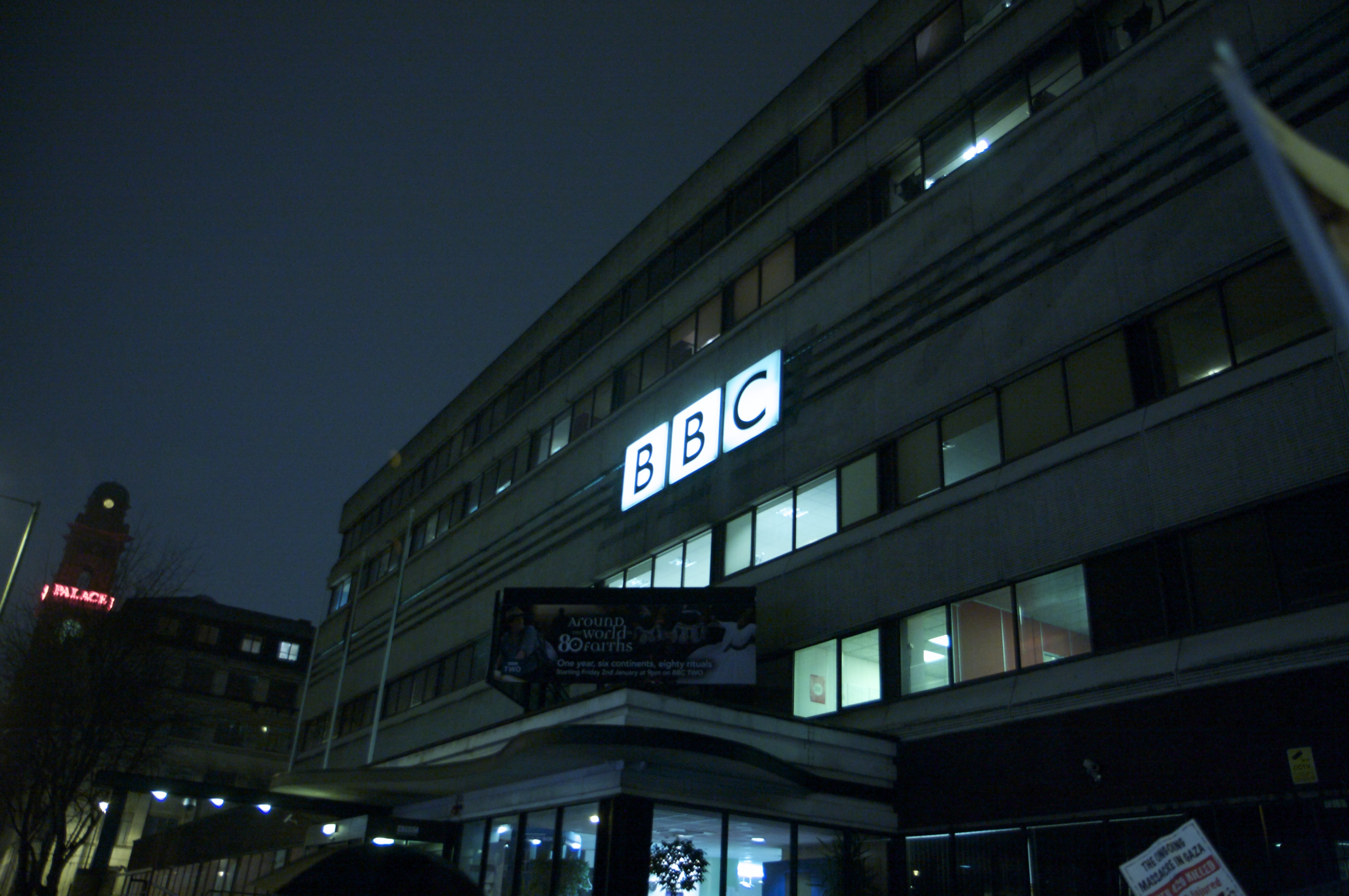
New Broadcasting House at night

New Broadcasting House was built on a site bounded by Oxford Road, Charles Street, Princess Street and Brancaster Road. To the rear of the building was the River Medlock. A compulsory purchase order for the site was approved by the Minister of Housing and Local Government on 21 July 1967 and planning began the same year. Planning permission was granted in December 1968. Designs by an external architect were abandoned in February 1970 in favour of plans by R. A. Sparks from the BBC's Architectural and Civil Engineering Department. New planning permission was granted in March 1971, and construction began in December 1971 and was completed in 1975.

Construction was in three stages – the network production centre for local radio and outside broadcasts, a rehearsal studio for the Northern Symphony Orchestra and the regional television centre. Radio Manchester was built on the upper ground floor in the west of the office block with a 754 square metre area. Studio A, a 453 square metre television studio, was built in the single-storey building behind the office block. The central technical area was next to the TV and radio studios. A 180-seat restaurant was built on the second floor. The view from the top of the building was of the Mancunian Way.

The building was supported on 214 piles, bored to a maximum depth of around 13 metres. The building frame was made of reinforced concrete infilled with flat soffit slabs and 2,100 square metres of windows. Its architecture has been ridiculed as 'drab' and unfit for the 21st century.

== History ==
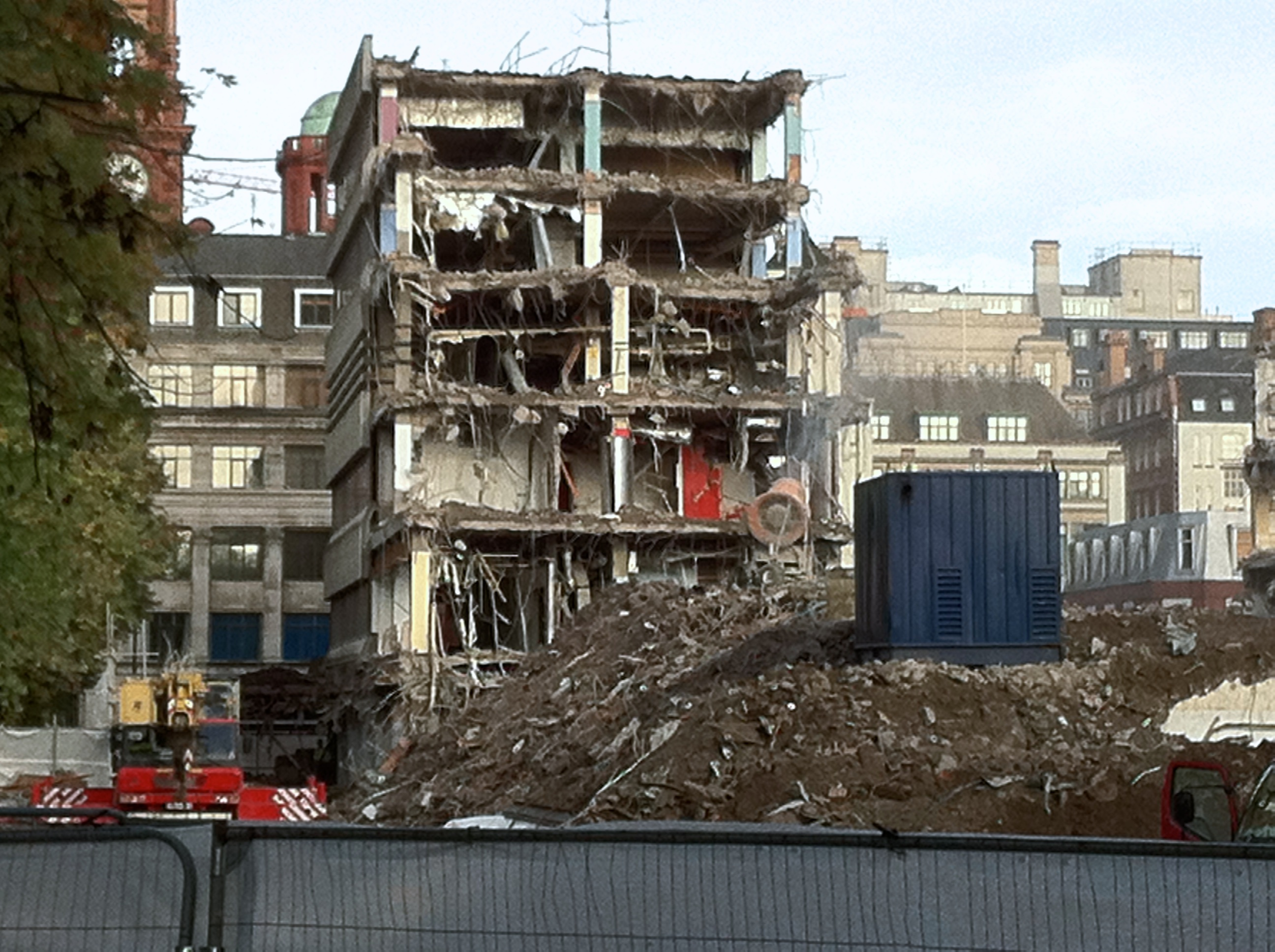
New Broadcasting House being demolished in 2012

Before New Broadcasting House opened, the BBC's Manchester base was at Broadcasting House in Piccadilly, and from 1958 it occupied four floors of Peter House in St Peter's Square. Dickenson Road Studios, the former studio of Mancunian Films in Rusholme, was bought in 1954 and Milton Hall on Deansgate was the home of the BBC Northern Symphony Orchestra which became the BBC Philharmonic in 1982. The BBC also bought The Playhouse in Hulme in 1955 for use as a TV and radio recording studio, then as a studio for radio and music rehearsals only from the mid-1960s. The last broadcast was in 1986 and it was sold in 1989. The BBC studio was based in the smaller of two theatres in the same building known as Hulme Hippodrome, the entire building having been opened in two phases in 1901 and 1902. Before buying its smaller twin, the BBC had rented the larger theatre for studio use on Sundays with live audiences from 1950 to 1956 and installed a wooden control room in the Circle seating area.

Staff moved into the building on the weekend of 12–13 July 1975, and it was fully operational by September 1975 and officially inaugurated as the headquarters of BBC North on 18 June 1976. A second television studio was opened in May 1981 for regional TV news, leading to the closure of Broadcasting House in Piccadilly after 52 years. About 800 staff worked at the site.

New Broadcasting House was home to BBC Manchester, BBC Radio Manchester, BBC North West, the BBC Philharmonic Orchestra and the BBC Religion and Ethics Department. On opening, the radio station was named BBC Radio Manchester; it changed its name to BBC GMR (and briefly, GMR Talk) before reverting to its original name in April 2006.

In 2010, the building was offered for sale as the BBC's move to MediaCityUK rendered it surplus to requirements and it was sold for £10 million in April 2011. The BBC sign from the front of the building was removed in November 2011 shortly after the last department, regional TV, moved to MediaCityUK ending 35 years of broadcasting from the studios on Sunday 27 November 2011.

== See also ==
- Circle Square Manchester
- Granada Studios – ITV Granada's base in Manchester
- 3SixtyMedia – BBC Manchester and Granada joint venture
