= Cold Ash Hill =

Hamlet in Hampshire, England

Coordinates: 51.0841°N 0.7874°W

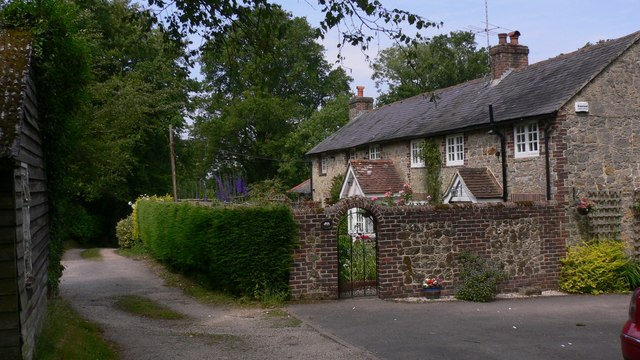
- Near Hewshott Lane

- Location within Hampshire
- OS grid reference: SU8631432556
- Civil parish: Bramshott and Liphook
- District: East Hampshire
- Shire county: Hampshire
- Region: South East
- Country: England
- Sovereign state: United Kingdom
- Post town: LIPHOOK
- Postcode district: GU30 7
- Police: Hampshire and Isle of Wight
- Fire: Hampshire and Isle of Wight
- Ambulance: South Central
- UK Parliament: East Hampshire

Cold Ash Hill is a hamlet in the East Hampshire district of Hampshire, England. Nearby settlements include the town of Haslemere and the villages of Liphook, Bramshott and Linchmere and the hamlet of Hammer. For transport there is the A3 road and Liphook railway station nearby.
