= Mary Robb =

Mary Robb may refer to:

- Mary Anne Robb (1829–1912), English botanist
- Mary Lee Robb (1926–2006), American radio actress during the 1940s and 1950s
