= Ken Wood (manufacturer) =

English engineer, entrepreneur & businessman (1916–1997)

Kenneth Maynard Wood
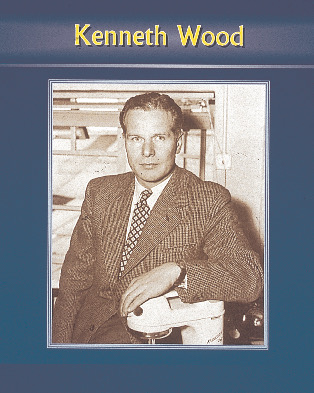
- Born: 4 October 1916; Lewisham, London, England
- Died: 19 October 1997 (aged 81); Liphook, Hampshire, England
- Occupations: Engineer; entrepreneur; businessman
- Family: Charles Riley Maynard (grandfather)

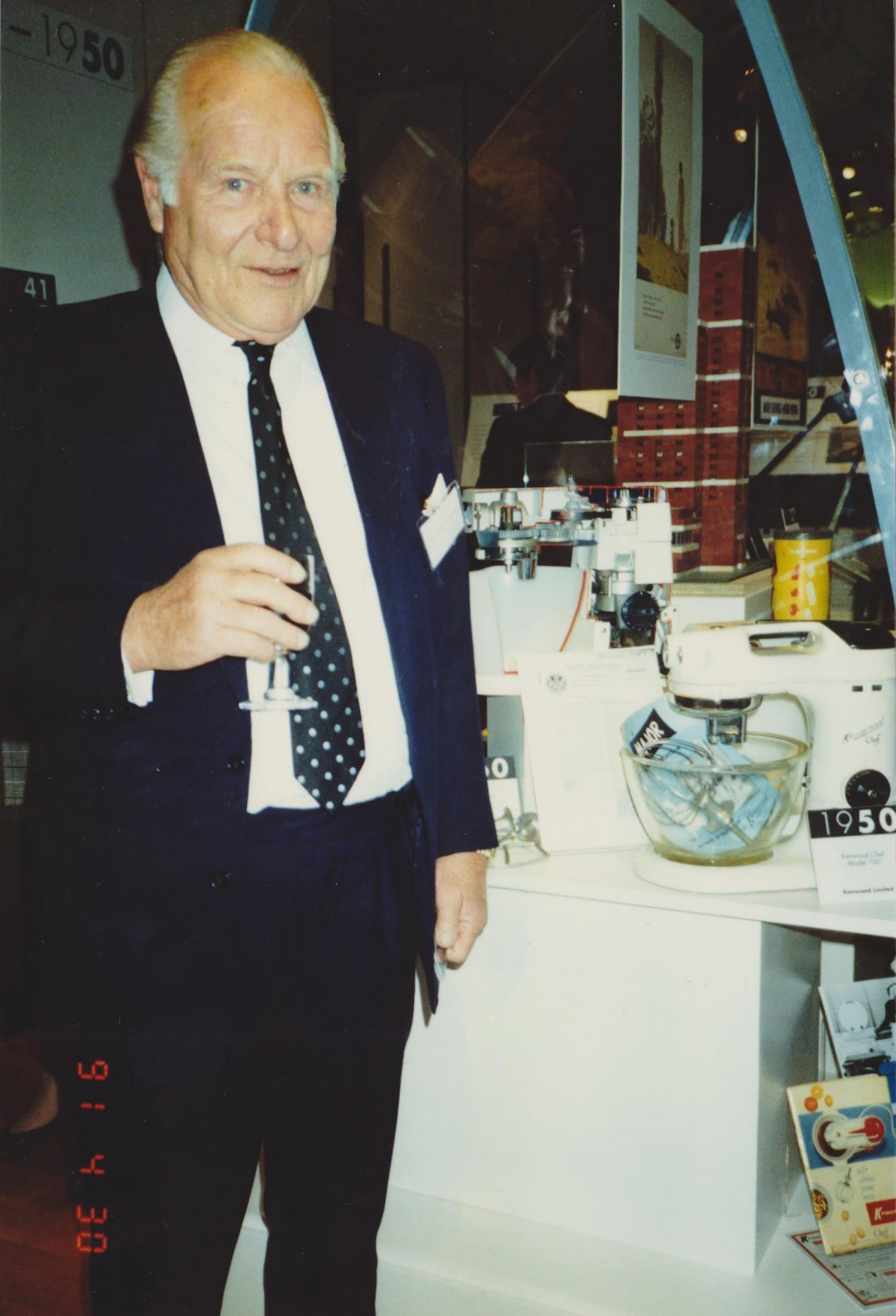
Kenneth Wood aged 74

Kenneth Wood (4 October 1916 – 19 October 1997) was an English engineer, entrepreneur and businessman. He is best known as the founder of the Kenwood Manufacturing Company and for the development of the eponymous Kenwood Chef food mixer.

== Life and career ==
Grandson of confectionery manufacturer Charles Riley Maynard, founder of Maynards, Kenneth Wood was born on 4 October 1916 in Lewisham in London.

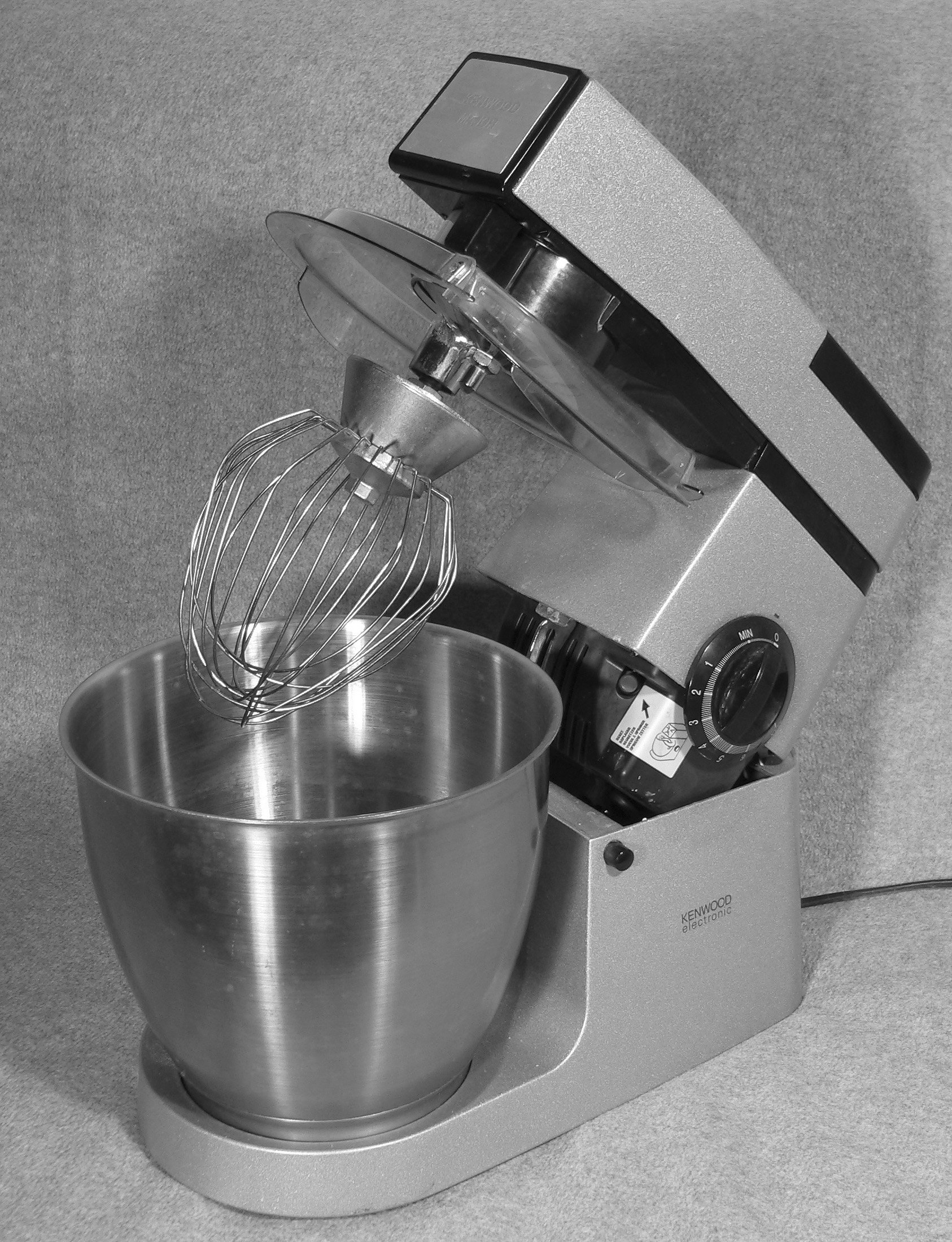
A Kenwood Major.

He was brought up in Chelsfield in Kent and was educated at Bromley County School before leaving home in 1930, aged fourteen to join the merchant navy for five years, after which, he studied electrical engineering and accountancy at night school. A year later, in 1936, he set up his own company, Dickson & Wood, selling, installing and repairing radios and televisions.

In 1939, he sold the company and joined the Royal Air Force where he worked as an engineer at the Admiralty developing radar and electronic controls.

After the war, he founded Woodlau Industries, with wartime colleague Roger Laurence, starting production in 1947 in Woking with the A100 turnover toaster, an appliance that was uncommon in the UK at that time, and then the A200 food mixer - the predecessor of the Kenwood Chef which was launched in 1950. When Roger Laurence left the company, Wood changed the name to Kenwood Manufacturing Company Ltd. The company moved to Havant in Hampshire in 1961, then employing a workforce of 700.

Kenwood's products were successful because Wood identified household tasks that gave housewives most work and developed machines to do those jobs. Within a few years of setting up the company, he was one of Britain's youngest millionaires. However, in 1968, Wood parted company with Kenwood Manufacturing after a hostile takeover by Thorn Electrical Industries although he maintained an interest in the company until his death.

On 31 May 1972, he was granted the Freedom of the City of London as a result of his membership of the Worshipful Company of Farriers.

Between 1972–80, Wood was chairman and managing director of the Dawson-Keith Group of Companies, mostly a maker of generators. In 1984, he was appointed Fellow of the Institute of Ophthalmology.

He founded Forest Mere Health Farm (now Champneys Forest Mere) and the keen golfer invested in Old Thorns Manor Hotel, his then-Hampshire home, with television commentator Peter Alliss, both in Liphook and was also chairman of the governors of Wispers School in Haslemere, Surrey (which closed in 2008).

He was managing director of Hydrotech Systems between 1984–87.

Wood died on 19 October 1997 in Liphook, Hampshire after a short illness. He left a widow, Patricia, two sons and two daughters by his previous marriage, and three stepsons.

On 7 September 2017, a blue plaque in memory of Kenneth Wood was unveiled in Goldsworth Road, Woking at the site where the company first started in 1947.
