= Michael Barnes (cricketer) =

English cricketer

Personal information
- Full name: Michael William Barnes
- Born: 3 April 1985 (age 41); Frimley, Surrey, England
- Height: 5 ft 11 in (1.80 m)
- Batting: Right-handed
- Role: Wicketkeeper

Domestic team information
- Years: Team
- 2007: Warwickshire

Career statistics
Competition	First-class	List A
Matches	1	1
Runs scored	–	1
Batting average	–	–
100s/50s	–/–	0/0
Top score	–	1*
Catches/stumpings	5/–	5/–
- Source: Cricinfo, 26 September 2010

Michael William Barnes (born 3 April 1985) is an English former first-class cricketer, a right-handed batsman who played primarily as a wicketkeeper. He was born at Frimley, Surrey. He was educated at Bohunt School in Liphook, Hampshire and later at South Downs College in Waterlooville, Hampshire.

Barnes played a single first-class match for Warwickshire against Yorkshire in the 2007 County Championship. He was not called upon to bat during the match, but from behind the stumps he took 5 catches. He also played a single List A match for Warwickshire against Lancashire in the 2007 Friends Provident Trophy. In his only List-A match, he scored 1 not out and from behind the stumps he took 5 catches, a record for a debutant in both games. He was released by Warwickshire at the end of the 2007 season and subsequently retired from professional cricket. He went on to coach as the Cricket Professional at RGS Guildford until 2023. Barnes is an ECB level 4 specialist qualified cricket coach. As of March 2023, Barnes is employed by Surrey County Club as Pathway Lead Batting Coach.
