= Hammer Bottom =

Hamlet in Hampshire, England

Coordinates: 51.0866°N 0.7564°W

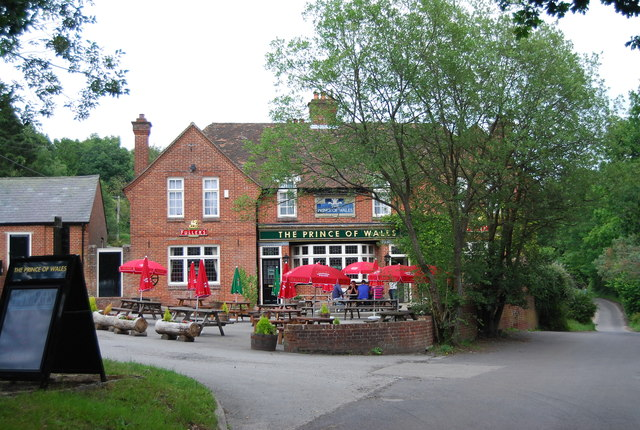
- Prince of Wales pub, Hammer Lane

- Location within Hampshire
- Civil parish: Bramshott and Liphook
- District: East Hampshire
- Shire county: Hampshire
- Region: South East
- Country: England
- Sovereign state: United Kingdom

Hammer Bottom or Hammer Vale is a hamlet in the civil parish of Bramshott and Liphook, in the East Hampshire district in the county of Hampshire, England. Hammer Bottom lies at the meeting point of the counties of Hampshire, West Sussex and Surrey. Nearby settlements include the town of Haslemere, the villages of Liphook, Bramshott, Linchmere (sometimes also spelt Lynchmere), Shottermill, Camelsdale, Critchmere, Hammer and Woolmer Hill. For transport there is the B2131 road which the hamlet is nearly on and the A3 road, the A287 road, the A286 road nearby. The nearest railway station is Haslemere railway station. It once had a beer house called the Sussex Bell. The Prince of Wales pub dates from the 1920s, and was listed in the 50th edition of the Good Beer Guide.
