= Ravensbourne School, Bromley =

Orion Ravensbourne School

Location
- Hayes Lane (B265); Bromley, Greater London, BR2 9EH; England; 51°23′38″N 0°01′15″E

Information
- Type: Academy
- Motto: Trust • Kindness • Endeavour
- Established: 1911
- Department for Education URN: 136540 Tables
- Ofsted: Reports
- Headteacher: Mark Ridley
- Gender: Mixed-sex education
- Age: 11 to 18
- Enrolment: 1526
- Former name: Bromley Grammar School
- Also known as: The Ravensbourne School
- Academy Trust: Orion Education (formerly E21C)
- Website: http://www.ravensbourne.info

Orion Ravensbourne School is a secondary academy school in the London Borough of Bromley. It stands on a 22-acre (8.9 ha) site in Hayes Lane, to the south of Bromley, and in the parish of Bromley St Mark. It is named after the River Ravensbourne, which runs nearby.

== History ==
=== Grammar school ===
The school was opened in 1911 as the Bromley County Grammar Schools for Boys and Girls, on two sites: Hayes Lane (boys) and Nightingale Lane (girls). The Hayes Lane site was officially opened on 18 October 1911. They were later renamed Bromley Grammar Schools. The buildings in Hayes Lane were considerably extended in 1933, using the original architect and keeping to the original neo-Georgian design. The new buildings comprised the Great Hall (connected to the original building by an open cloister) the science block, and the dining hall and gymnasium on either side of the hall. The new buildings were officially opened on 30 November 1934. Many of the School's early buildings are recognised as being of historic interest and are Grade II listed.

The schools were controlled by Kent Education Committee until 1965. The girls' school had around 700 girls in the mid-1960s.

=== Comprehensive ===
In the late 1960s, following the then government's drive to phase out selective education, the Bromley Grammar Schools were merged with the nearby Raglan Road secondary modern school, to form the new Ravensbourne Schools, still on the two separate sites for boys and girls. The girls' school became comprehensive by degrees; the intake of 11-year-olds in September 1974 was the first non-selective one.

=== Closure of separate sex schools ===
In 1988 the Education Authority decided that the two separate single sex schools should be amalgamated into one new co-educational comprehensive school. The girls' school site in Nightingale Lane was closed in July 1989 and a programme of building works was embarked upon in order to make the boys' school suitable for its new co-educational role. The new co-educational Ravensbourne School opened at the Hayes Lane site in September 1989.

=== Fraud ===
In 1995 governors failed to properly check the CV of the school bursar who claimed to be a qualified accountant. In 2005 "massive deficits" in the schools' accounts were discovered and the bursar was found to have stolen money from the school using blank cheques signed by the headteacher.

=== New sixth form building ===
In 2003, with over subscription in Years 7 to 11 and an expanding sixth form called the Post 16 centre, yet more building work was undertaken. A new dedicated sixth form block was created, the drama studios expanded and the War Memorial Library refurbished in the original style. A new Lower School Library was installed in what was, in 1911, the dining hall for the original 79 boys.

=== Admissions controversy ===
In October 2009 the school was found to have "significant faults" with its appeals procedures when a government ombudsman found that members of its admissions panel were not properly trained and the clerk's recording of the appeal was "inadequate."

=== Academy ===
On 1 April 2011, Ravensbourne School transferred to academy status. This allowed the school to manage its own finances.

=== ESFA financial mismanagement report (2018) ===
A report released on 7 November 2018 alongside a DfE Financial Notice to Improve uncovered financial mismanagement relating to how the Ravensbourne School head teacher and Education for the 21st Century academy trust (E21C) CEO was paid for his duties as CEO. The trust failed to 'fully declare related party transactions, meet employee tax liabilities and seek prior ESFA approval of a novel, contentious and repercussive transaction'. The trust paid its CEO excessively without justification through a means against legislation IR35, improperly documented these payments and failed to pay any tax on the total of £145,006.00 paid to the CEO for duties as CEO between 2014 and May 2018.

The Ravensbourne head teacher, Paul Murphy, was suspended as head teacher on 13 November 2018 after Bob Neill Conservative MP for Bromley and Chislehurst raised concerns in the House of Commons that he had been allowed to remain in post as headteacher despite his misconduct as CEO of the E21C trust.

In January 2019, Murphy resigned from his position of headteacher at the school. He was replaced by Mark O’Shaughnessy.

=== Grade awarding controversy ===
On 2 September 2021, The Guardian reported that the school had undermarked students' GCSE grades by an average of 1 and a half grades due to results being "significantly better than in previous years", and in order to avoid allegations of grade inflation. It came following the government's decision to cancel the GCSE 2021 exams due to the COVID-19 pandemic. The school's Deputy Headteacher was accused of telling staff members repeatedly to undermark students, with many students being marked with grades significantly less than previous mock exams

== Ofsted inspections ==
Ofsted made a report in October 2014. The school received an 'outstanding' from Ofsted in 2006–2007. This was downgraded to 'good' in 2009–2010. The inspector at that time commented in a letter to the students, "We judged the school to be good. You achieve average standards in your GCSEs, though mathematics and English standards are not as high as in many other subjects.". In January 2013 Ofsted's interim assessment statement extended the second grade 'good.

The school's best results came from internally assessed vocational qualifications but it struggled to produce the same high standards in more academic examined subjects. OFSTED commented, "Students make the best progress in many applied A level subjects. Leaders recognise that progress is not as rapid in some A-level subjects and are taking action to improve this."

== See also ==
- Ravensbourne College of Design and Communication

== Notable former pupils ==
=== Bromley Grammar School for Boys ===
- Michael Baughen, Bishop of Chester from 1982 to 1996
- Edward Britton, General Secretary of the National Union of Teachers from 1970–5
- Ian Brackenbury Channell, The Wizard of New Zealand
- John Cole, professor of human and regional geography at the University of Nottingham from 1975 to 1994
- Nigel Finch, BBC documentary director for Arena
- George Martin, music producer
- Michael Neubert, Conservative MP for Romford from 1974 to 1997
- Leslie Stanbridge, Church of England priest
- Ken Wood, inventor who produced the Kenwood Chef and formed Kenwood Limited (now owned since 2001 by the Italian company DeLonghi)
- Michael York, actor
- Charles Sandbank, British electronics engineer

=== Ravensbourne School for Boys ===
- Billy Idol, rock musician
- Trevor Goddard, actor
- Mike Friday, Former rugby player, now rugby coach

=== Ravensbourne School ===
- Keeley Hazell, model and breast cancer awareness campaigner
- Montell Douglas Sportswoman, sprinter, British Record Holder for the 100m and part of the Great Britain women's two-woman bobsleigh team
