= Ravensbourne School =

Ravensbourne School may refer to:

- Ravensbourne School (Bromley)
- Ravensbourne School (Dunedin)
- Ravensbourne School (Havering)
