= Bramshott =

Village and parish in Hampshire, England

Coordinates: 51.08928°N 0.79827°W

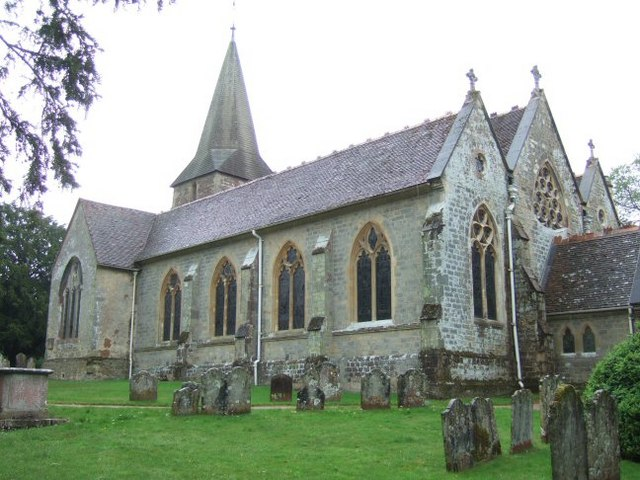
- Church of St Mary the Virgin

- Location within Hampshire
- OS grid reference: SU842329
- Civil parish: Bramshott and Liphook
- District: East Hampshire
- Shire county: Hampshire
- Region: South East
- Country: England
- Sovereign state: United Kingdom
- Post town: Liphook
- Postcode district: GU30
- Police: Hampshire and Isle of Wight
- Fire: Hampshire and Isle of Wight
- Ambulance: South Central
- UK Parliament: East Hampshire

Bramshott is a village and parish with mediaeval origins in the East Hampshire district of Hampshire, England. It lies 0.9 miles (1.4 km) north of Liphook, and with Liphook forms the civil parish of Bramshott and Liphook.

The nearest railway station, Liphook, is 1.3 miles (2.1 km) south of the village.

== History ==
Bramshott Manor is described in the 1086 Domesday Book as held by Edward of Salisbury from the king with two freemen, thirteen tenants (of restricted freedom) and two mills. Ludshott Manor, lying to the north of Bramshott Manor, is recorded with ten households and a mill. Chiltlee Manor lay to the south of Bramshott Manor and was recorded as being held by the king, William the Conqueror, with four tenants and land for two ploughs, worth fifty three shillings (£2.65). These manors lay on the edge of the royal forest of Woolmer, with the origins of Liphook perhaps built as smallholdings to serve huntsmen.

The first evidence for Bramshott ecclesiastical parish is the record of Matthew as its first Rector in 1225 and the early 13th century church. The parish evolved from the medieval manors of Brembreste (Bramshott today), Lidessete (Ludshott), Ciltelelei (Chiltlee), the royal forest of Woolmer and fragments of two other manors.

The village grew until the 14th century but was checked by the Black Death. It seems some people escaped from the manors to Liphook to evade taxes of the Lord. Since the 16th century development of Bramshott has been intertwined with that of Liphook.

Part of the ancient parish of Bramshott used to be in the county of Sussex, comprising an irregularly shaped protrusion of that county's territory containing Holly Hills and Griggs Green. This reached as far north as the lake at Canforth Park Farm. In addition Bramshott had a small enclave within Sussex, comprising Croft House Farm near Folly Mere.

The parish in 1868 covered 6,676 acres (2,702 ha) and included the then "considerable" village of Liphook and parts of Passfield and Grayshott, and was then in the Diocese of Winchester. A large proportion of the parish was described as "waste land".

In the 21st century, a detailed study was carried out for Hampshire County Council which identified and dated many of Bramshott's historical areas and buildings for further study.

=== Wartime Canadian forces ===
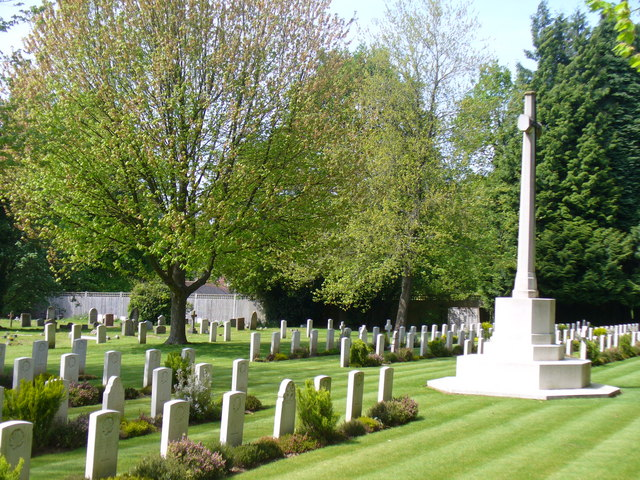
Military Cemetery, Bramshott

In the graveyard of the parish church of St Mary there are the graves of 348 servicemen, mostly Canadian soldiers who were stationed at nearby Bramshott Camp during the First World War, including many victims of the influenza pandemic of 1918-20, and some who were stationed there during the Second World War. The war graves are cared for by the Commonwealth War Graves Commission.

Alongside the A3 there is a memorial to the Canadian troops which comprises, according to the Imperial War Museum's dedication page:

Avenue of c. 400 trees, one for each Canadian serviceman who died in WW1 and WW2. These trees are each side of the A3 and there is an underpass to cross the road safely. Each tree is twinned with a grave in Bramshott Churchyard and St Joseph's Catholic Church, Grayshott. There is a memorial near the A3 WMR #40272

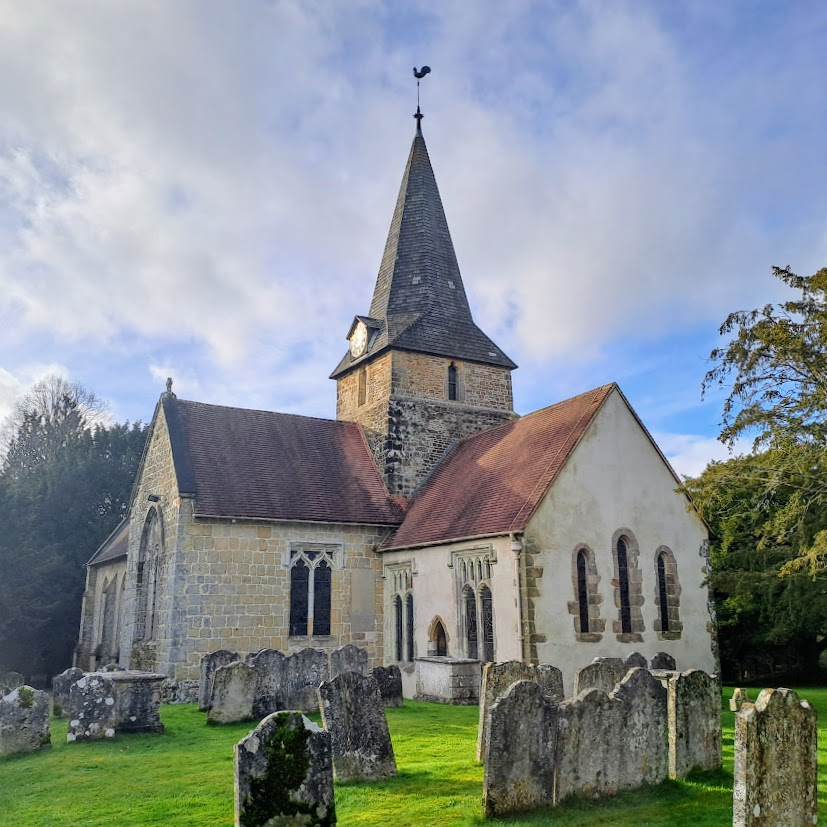
St Mary's Church, Bramshott, Hants

== Parish church ==
The parish church of St Mary the Virgin is a Grade II* listed building, dating from the 13th century with later alterations. The parish is in the deanery of Petersfield and the Diocese of Portsmouth. Church records from 1560 to 2010 are held by Hampshire Archives and Local Studies. The church bells were a gift from the widow of actor Boris Karloff; he had spent some of his last years helping to raise funds for the church. The churchyard war memorial and several tombs are listed structures.

== Local features ==
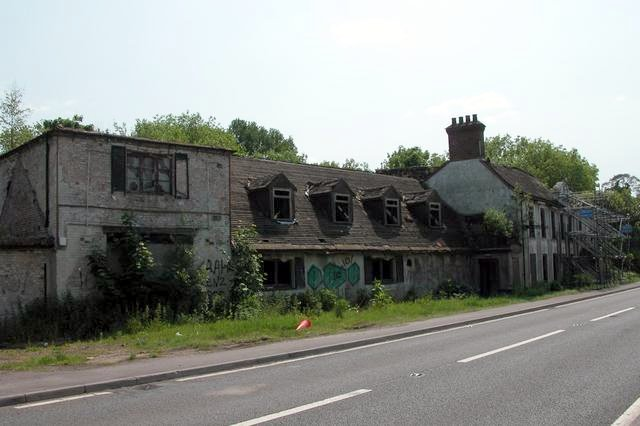
The ruined Spaniard Inn

To the east of the village, Bramshott Chase and Bramshott Common is an area of National Trust woodland and heathland adjacent to the A3 London to Portsmouth Road; it is popular for walking and 20 acres (8.1 ha) is under the care of the Woodland Trust.

A large inn, originally named Seven Thorns Inn, later The Spaniard Inn, stood beside the A3 at Bramshott Chase. It was reputed to have been the haunt of a local highwayman and body snatchers. It had once been home to The Ravens nightclub, and a shed at the rear had been used by the fledgeling band Fleetwood Mac. After a fire in the 1990s the building was derelict for many years and was demolished in 2019, the plot subsequently being used for a local BMW dealership, Barons.

== Notable people ==
Tudor statesman and churchman John Boxall (died 1571) came from Bramshott. 16th century priest Edmund Mervin held a living in Bramshott. Politician John Hooke had property in Bramshott where he died in 1685. Lawyer and politician William Erle (died 1880) lived in his country seat at Bramshott.

William Wolfe Capes (1715-1886) was made rector of Bramshott in 1869. Churchman Lloyd Crossley (died 1926) retired to Bramshott. Theosophist and writer Charles Webster Leadbeater (died 1934) lived for a time in Bramshott. The actor Boris Karloff, born William Henry Pratt in London, lived in retirement in Bramshott in a house named Roundabout until his death in 1969. Royal Navy officer Bertram Thesiger (died 1966) lived at Clerks in Bramshott.
