= Liphook =

Village in Hampshire, England

Coordinates: 51°04′34″N 0°48′11″W

- Village
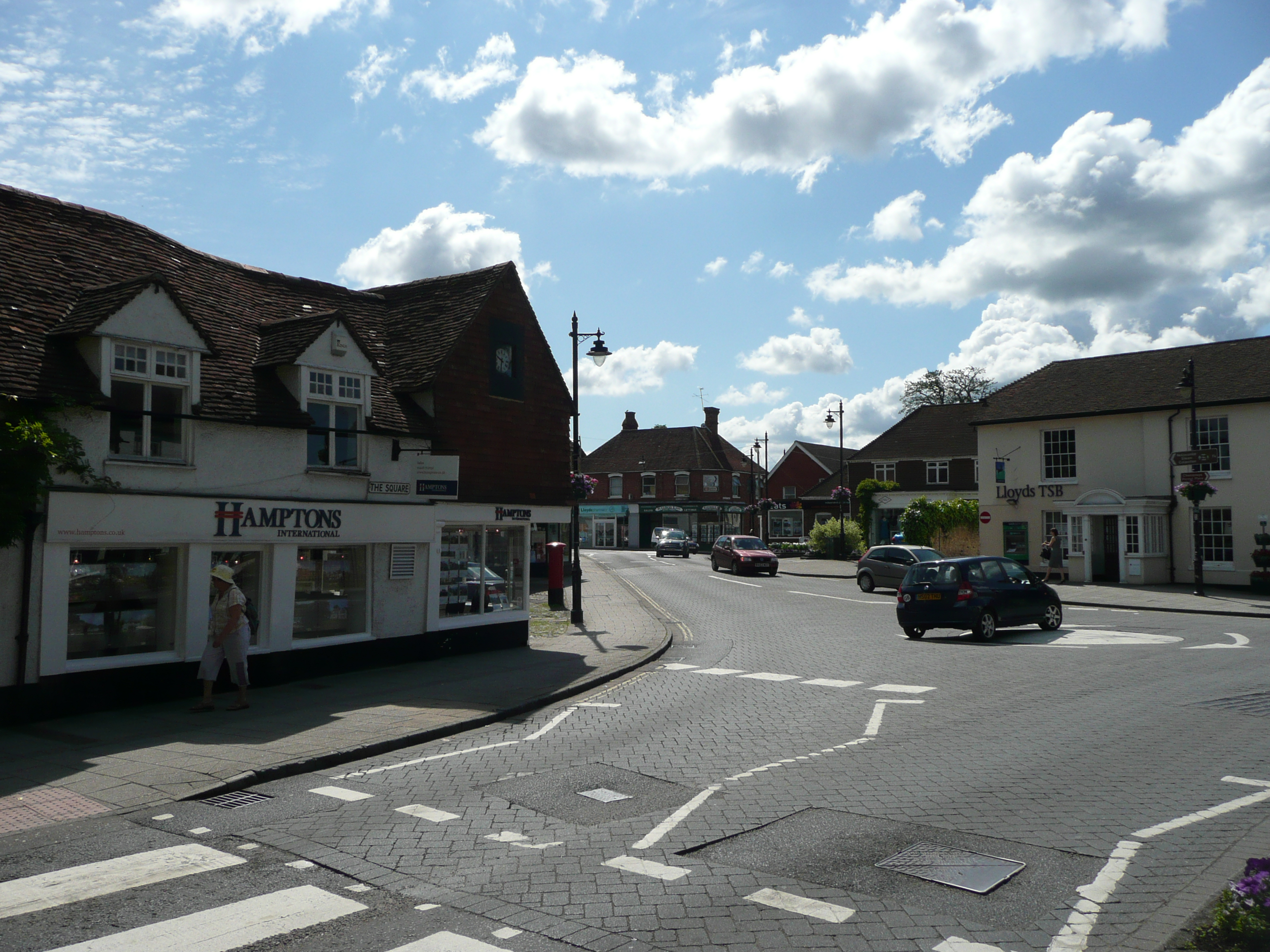
- Liphook village centre with shops

- Location within Hampshire
- Population: 8,491 (2011 Census)
- OS grid reference: SU8331
- Civil parish: Bramshott and Liphook
- District: East Hampshire
- Shire county: Hampshire
- Region: South East
- Country: England
- Sovereign state: United Kingdom
- Post town: LIPHOOK
- Postcode district: GU30
- Dialling code: 01428
- Police: Hampshire and Isle of Wight
- Fire: Hampshire and Isle of Wight
- Ambulance: South Central
- UK Parliament: Farnham and Bordon

Liphook is a village in the East Hampshire district of Hampshire, England. It is 4.1 miles (6.6 km) west of Haslemere, bypassed by the A3 road, and lies on the Hampshire/West Sussex/Surrey borders. It is in the civil parish of Bramshott and Liphook, which includes Bramshott, Griggs Green, Conford, Passfield, Hammer Bottom (also called Hammer Vale), Ludshott Common and Waggoners Wells, and has an area of 6,540 acres (2,650 ha) and a population of 8,491 in 2011.

Liphook has a railway station, on the Portsmouth Direct line.

The village grew as a coaching stop between London and Portsmouth during the 17th and 18th centuries. It served as a base during the First World War and the Second World War for Canadian troops stationed in Southern England.

== History ==
=== Pre-coaching times ===
The first record of Liphook is in the Bramshott Manor Court Rolls to one 'Robert of Lupe' in 1281. Then follows Matilda of 'Lhupe' in 1337, William at 'Lupe' in 1365, John at 'Lepe' in 1386, and John Maunser at 'Leope' in 1423. On his death in 1428, John Maunser's tenancy at 'Lepe' between modern London Road and Headley Road is the first identifiable landmark in Liphook. Sir Edmund Pakynham inherited a tenement and land in 'Lepoke' in 1527, and John Hooke bought the manor of 'Chiltle' in 'Lippuck' in 1591. Chiltlee Manor lay to the south of Bramshott Manor and was recorded as being held by the king, William the Conqueror, with four tenants and land for two ploughs, worth fifty three shillings (£2.65). The manor lay on the edge of the royal hunting centre of Woolmer Forest.

John Speed's map of 1607 shows it as Lippocke.

Some people escaped from the manors of Bramshott, Chiltlee and Ludshott to Liphook, an area above the marshes around the River Wey, to evade taxes of their local Lords.

=== The coaching age ===
Liphook grew further as a coach stop on the London - Portsmouth route. In Tudor times mail was sent from London to Portsmouth via Southampton and the route through Liphook was only used in emergencies, such as the Armada of 1588. The map of 1675 by John Ogilby shows this road bypassing Bramshott and going through Lippock, however the quality of this road was very poor.

Originally travellers' needs were catered for by stalls, eventually replaced by the half-timbered houses that exist around The Square. Growth accelerated with wagons being replaced by coaches, and coaching in Liphook was firmly established by 1660. The roads were often unmaintained and unsigned - Samuel Pepys records three journeys by this road in May 1661, April 1662 and August 1668, on the last occasion staying in Lippock:

So to coach again, and got to Lippock, late over Hindhead, having an old man, a guide, in the coach with us; but got thither with great fear of being out of our way, it being ten at night. Here good, honest people; and after supper, to bed.

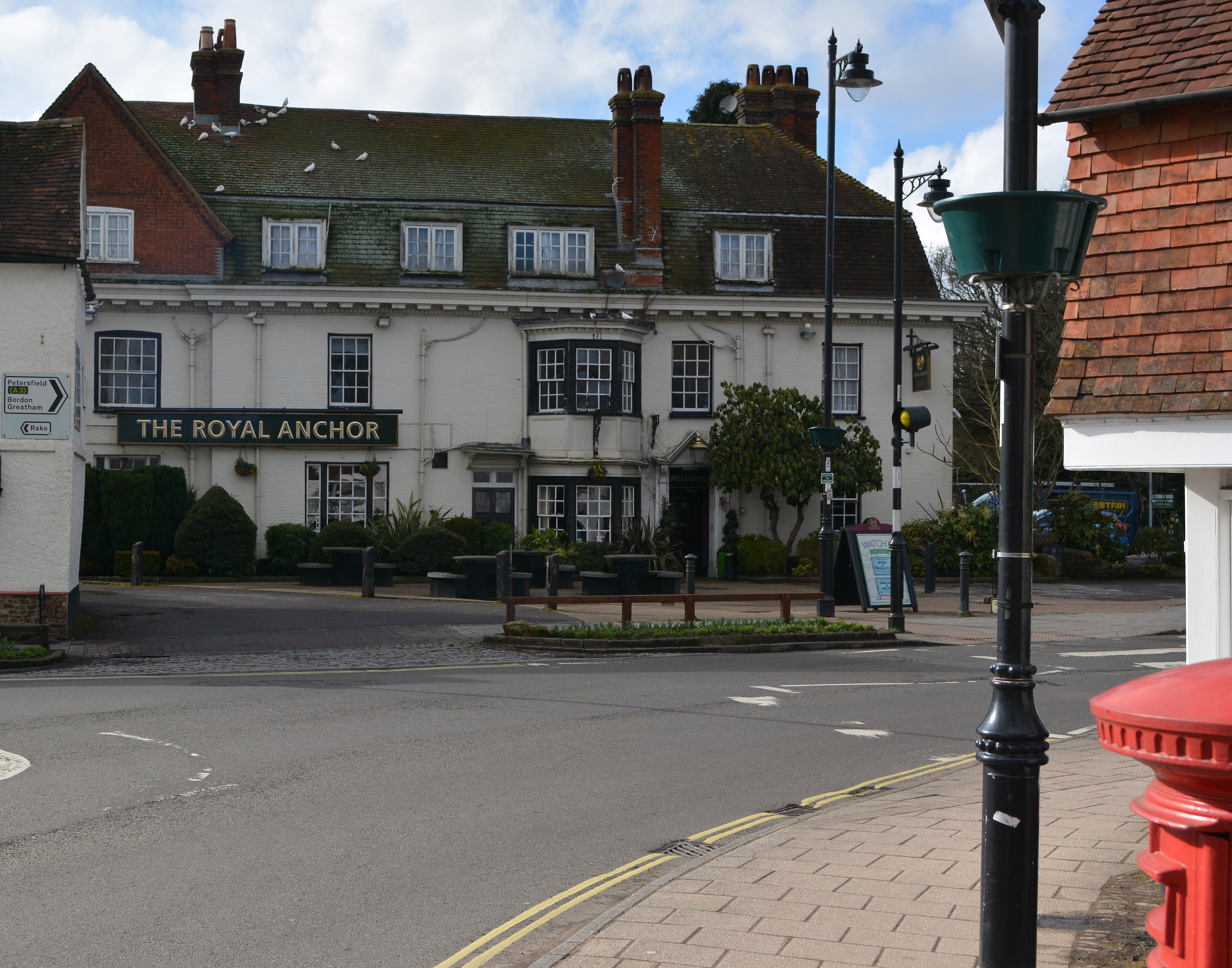
The Royal Anchor coaching inn, The Square, Liphook

A coach service from London to Portsmouth started in 1688, which coincided with growth of The Royal Anchor coaching inn, and other 17th century buildings in The Square. The Royal Anchor has a fireback dated 1588 which supports the supposition that there was an earlier building on the site.

In the 17th century the Royal Navy considered the road from Petersfield to Portsmouth impassable for heavy goods in winter. Improvements were made in the 18th century to roads and coaches along with the coming of the turnpike. Turnpiking between Petersfield and Portsmouth began in 1710 and between Kingston and Petersfield via Liphook in 1749. The Old Toll House by Radford Bridge in Liphook dates from the 18th century. Highwaymen were a problem in the 18th century as notices in the Royal Anchor show. By 1784 London-Portsmouth coaches carried mail through Liphook. Turnpiking reduced the journey from London-Portsmouth from two days in the 1660s to 10 hours in 1819. Cary's New Itinerary of 1819 records seven coaches on weekdays left London for Portsmouth via Liphook and three during the night.

Local tradition has it that Nelson spent his last night in England in Liphook before sailing for the Battle of Trafalgar. George III and Queen Charlotte on their stay gave permission for The Blue Anchor to be renamed The Royal Anchor.

In Samuel Lewis's 1831 Topographical Dictionary of England, he referred to Liphook as a hamlet in the parish of Bramshott.

=== The railway era ===
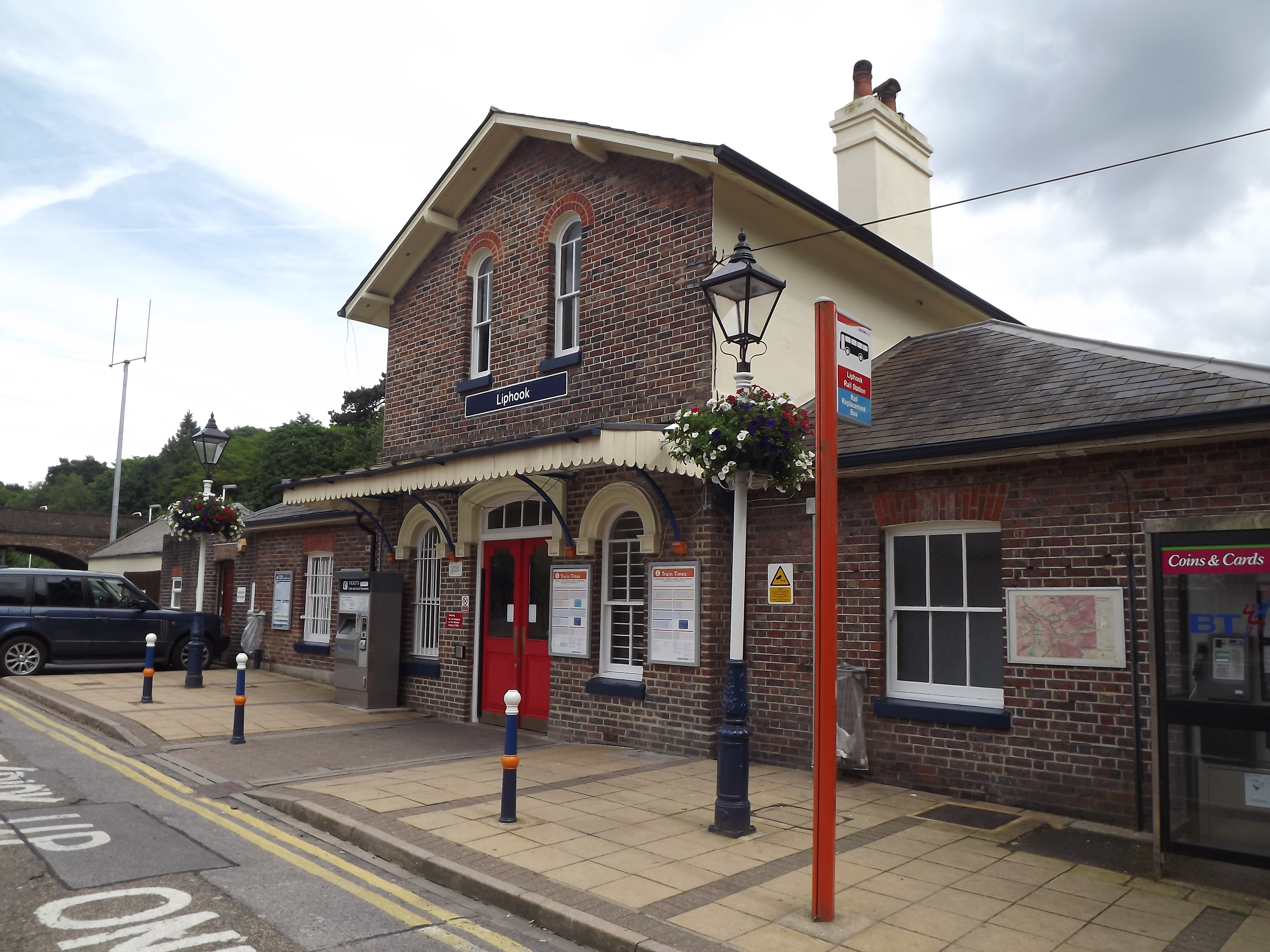
Liphook Railway Station

The London and South Western Railway came to Liphook in 1859. The Portsmouth Direct line was built after the 1840s 'Railway Mania'. Originally the LSWR route from London to Portsmouth was via a branch from Southampton to Gosport, where passengers then went on the chain ferry across Portsmouth harbour. This lasted until the London, Brighton and South Coast Railway extended their London-Brighton line to Portchester. Initially the LSWR constructed a branch from Woking to Guildford in 1845 then Godalming in 1849, but were reluctant to extend it to Havant. Thomas Brassey, a railway contractor, was granted Act of Parliament to construct a single track in 1853 (doubling was completed on 1 March 1878). The first train arrived in Liphook on 24 January 1859, but a dispute between the LSWR and the LBSCR meant full service was not initiated until 7 May.

Railways caused the long-distance coaching trade to reduce in the village. The railway station became the hub of short-distance horse-drawn transport, with the blacksmiths shop in The Square flourishing until at least 1918.

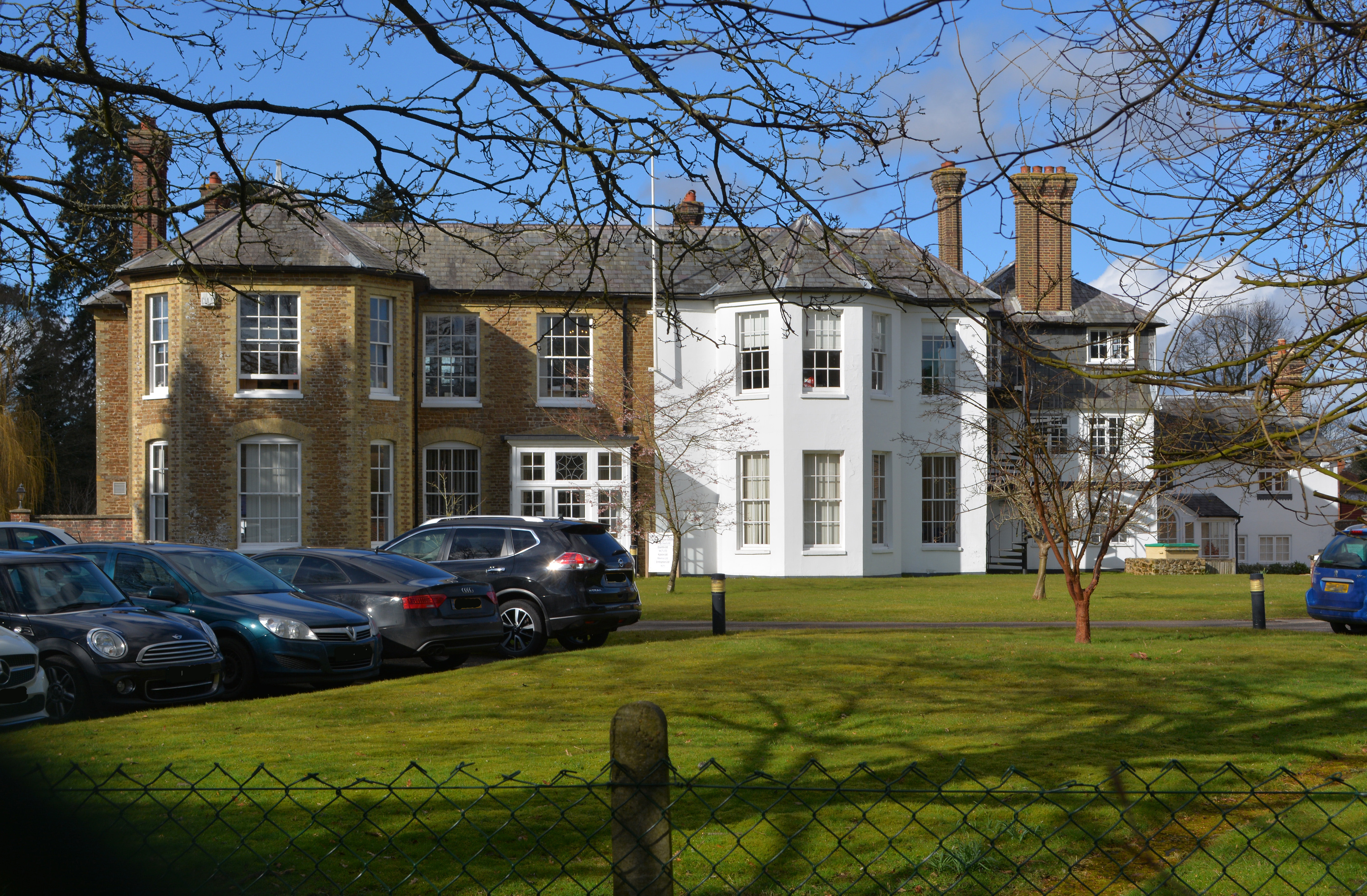
Chiltlee Manor House, Liphook

The railway was originally planned to bypass Liphook, but the Liphook Deviation amendment of the Act of Parliament altered it to its present course. In doing so it bisected the estate of Chiltlee Manor, a split that exists to this day. The northern part remained as fields and the village cricket pitch, until its requisition to become the British Army's Ordnance Supply Unit in 1939. After decommissioning it was sold to Sainsbury's to form the site of their shop, the Millennium Centre and several other housing developments. The southern part was sold to Mary Anne Robb in 1869, who built the house of Chiltlee Place and the surrounding arboretum in 1880. In the 1960s the site was sold to the Berg firm of builders for construction of their housing estate.

Liphook's population grew modestly, from 1,367 in 1861 to 1,614 in 1891. The railway did not cause a more substantial increase, since many could not afford to pay the fare for more than an occasional excursion. The Kelly's Directory of 1895 shows far more shopkeepers in Liphook than Bramshott: Liphook had become the predominant centre of the Parish of Bramshott. A few wealthy people however saw the potential of commuter travel, notably Mary Ann Robb and London solicitor William Thomas Longbourn, who bought Foley Manor in 1859. He later sold it to William Barrington Tristram, a former member of the Bombay Council who built the house's Victorian extension.

=== 20th century ===
From 1916 to 1928 author and poet Flora Thompson lived in Liphook where her husband was postmaster. Her first work, Bog-Myrtle and Peat, was published in 1921 when she lived in Liphook. The roads 'Lark Rise' and 'Candleford Gate' are named after two of the works.

During both World War I and II Liphook was the base for Canadian troops, particularly Bramshott Camp. Recent roads in Liphook have been given Canadian place names to commemorate the armed forces of that country which trained in this area during the World Wars. The cemetery of St Mary's church in Bramshott has a section of Canadian graves, including those of both war dead and victims of the influenza outbreak of 1918.

Liphook was one of three sites (with Longmoor and Bordon) occupied by the Royal Engineers' Engineer Stores Depot which, in 1948, employed 700 men. It was established in 1943, originally called Chiltlee Manor Engineer Stores Depot and in 1945 was designated 2 Engineer Stores Depot under the War Office. In 1948 the local MP (for Petersfield), General Sir George Jeffreys, asked the Secretary of State for War, Emanuel Shinwell, whether the men at Liphook were fully occupied as the men themselves stated that they were not. Mr Shinwell promised an investigation. The depot continued its military function until it was closed in 1968.

During the hot summer of 1983, Liphook made the news as the hottest spot (33.7C) in the United Kingdom on three days in July.

== Governance ==
Liphook is in the parliamentary constituency of Farnham and Bordon, and included in the civil parish of Bramshott and Liphook together with several other settlements nearby.

== Amenities ==
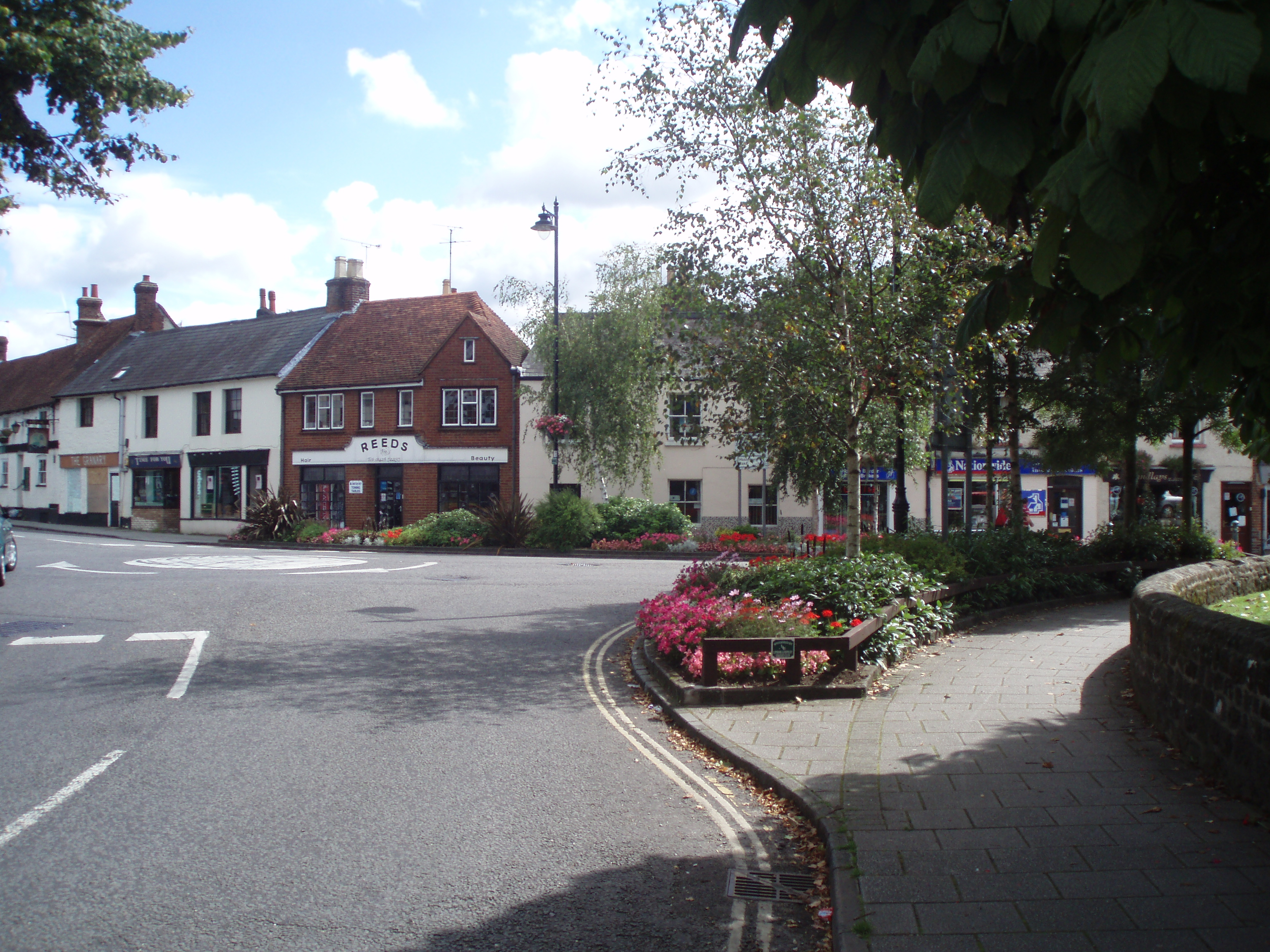
Liphook village centre

=== Transport ===
Liphook was located on both the main road (A3) and rail (Portsmouth Direct line) links between London and Portsmouth, but is now bypassed by the A3. It is served by Liphook railway station.

=== Education ===
Liphook is the location of the public school Churcher's College Junior school, (the Senior school being located in nearby Petersfield) and Highfield Brookham preparatory school. The site previously housed Littlefield school, which was bought by Churcher's and converted. Liphook is also the home of Bohunt School, a top fifty secondary state school.

=== Sport ===
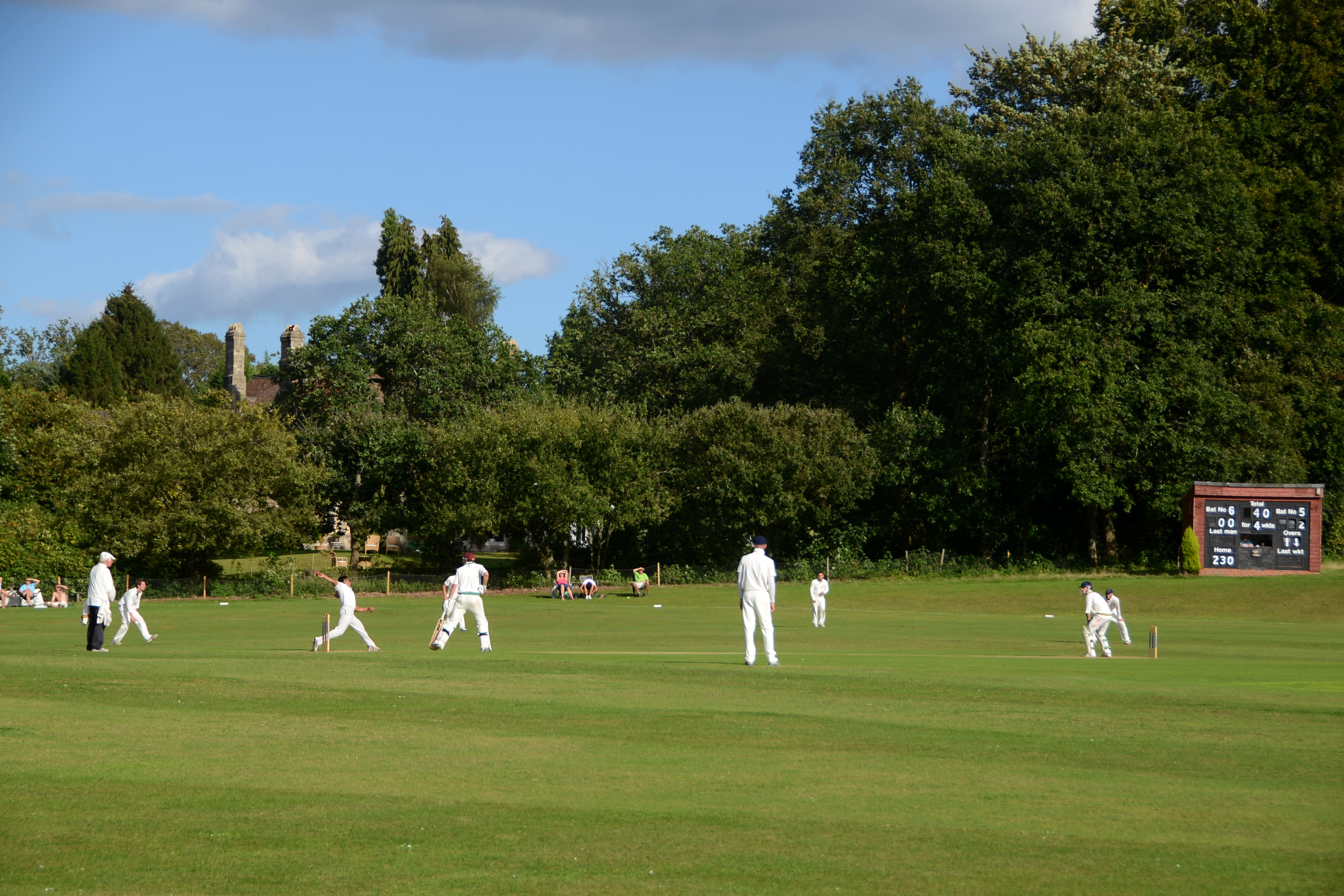
Liphook and Ripsley CC. Ripsley House beyond.

Liphook & Ripsley Cricket Club play on a ground to the southwest of the village just over the border in West Sussex. The club reached the National Village Cup final in 2018, but were beaten at Lord's by Folkton and Flixton by 72 runs.

Liphook United Football Club are based at London Road Recreation Ground. Founded in 1901, they are affiliated to the Hampshire Football Association and run 24 teams from boys through to veterans. The Men's 1st team are long standing members of the Hampshire Premier League and have twice been champions. They have also won the county Intermediate Cup on three occasions and the Aldershot Senior Cup twice.

There are two golf courses near the village: Old Thorns, designed by Peter Alliss, is to the west of the village and Liphook Golf Club is to the south, straddling the Portsmouth Road that was formerly the A3.

=== Community and culture ===
Liphook Millennium Centre contains a cinema and facilities for community events and occasions. Amateur drama has been a feature of village life since before World War 2. Liphook Amateur Dramatic Society (LADS) existed at least between the 1930s (revived 1955) and 1969. Two companies currently (2014) exist - Liphook Amateur Productions (LAMPS) and The MAD (Methodist Amateur Dramatic) Company.

=== Local attractions and business ===
Local attractions include the Hollycombe Steam Collection. On the last day of British Summer Time (usually the last Saturday in October) the village holds the Liphook Carnival with a procession of floats through the village followed by a bonfire and fireworks. It has taken place since 1903. "Liphook in Bloom" is an annual floral competition. Champneys health spa is west of the village at Forest Mere, a Site of Special Scientific Interest.

== Notable people ==
- Michael Barnes (b 1985), cricketer, attended Bohunt School
- Olivia Breen (b 1996), Paralympian athlete, attended Bohunt School
- Joanna Hardy of BBC Antiques Roadshow went to school here.
- John Clarke Hawkshaw (1841–1921), civil engineer, lived in Liphook
- Sir Adrian Holman (1895–1974), diplomat
- Arthur Michael Lee DCS QC (1913–1983) was born in the village
- Flora Thompson (1876–1947), author of Lark Rise to Candleford
- Inigo Triggs (1876–1923), architect and designer, set up home in Liphook in 1910
- Beatrice Webb, Lady Passfield (1858–1943), sociologist, economist and social reformer
- Sidney Webb, 1st Baron Passfield (1859–1947), politician, economist and social reformer
- Pete Wingfield (b 1948), musician and journalist
- Ken Wood (1916–1997), founder of Kenwood Manufacturing Co.
