= Griggs Green =

Hamlet in Hampshire, England

Coordinates: 51.079°N 0.829°W

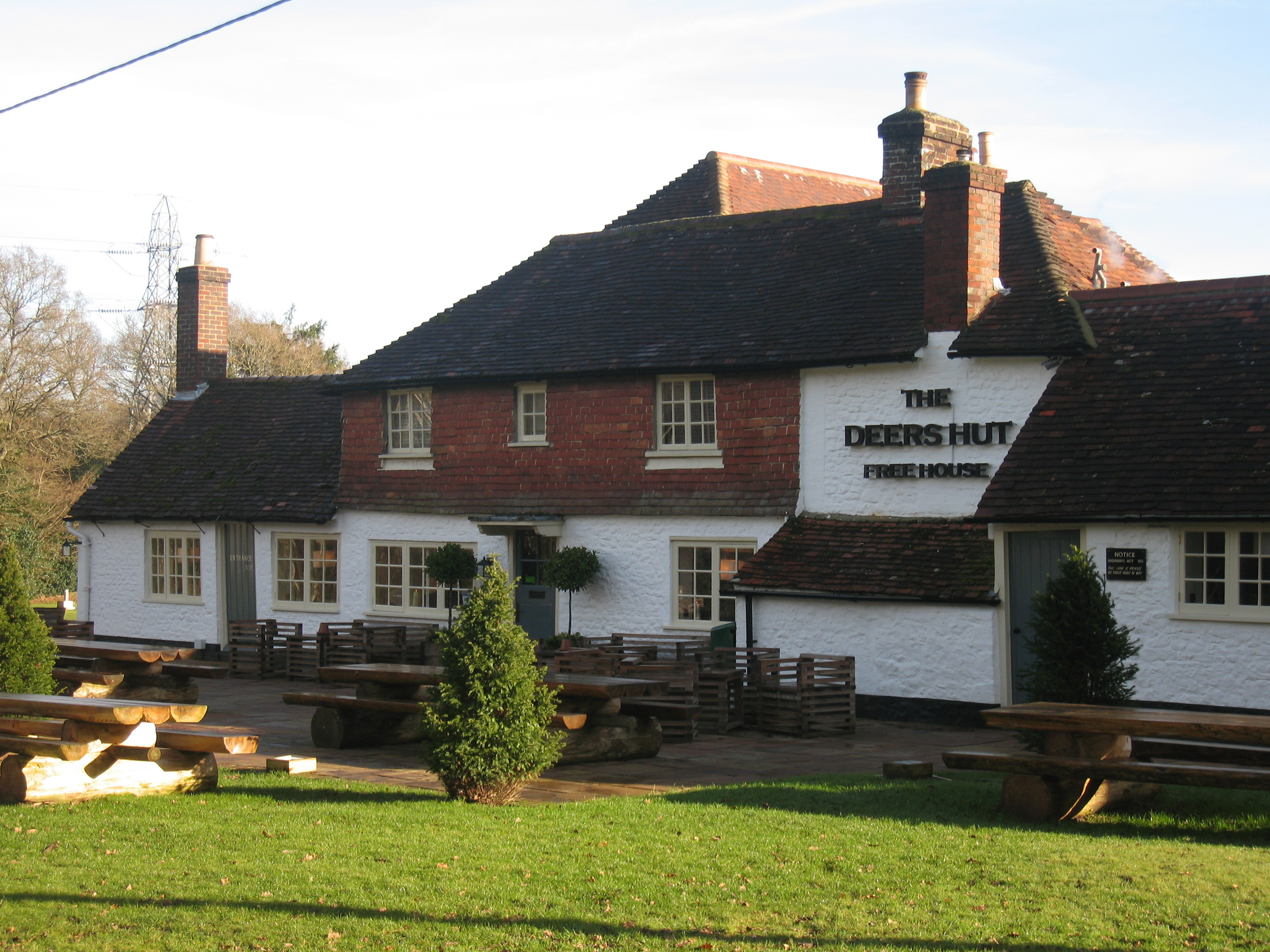
- The Deers Hut, Griggs Green

- Location within Hampshire
- OS grid reference: SU822318
- Civil parish: Bramshott and Liphook
- District: East Hampshire
- Shire county: Hampshire
- Region: South East
- Country: England
- Sovereign state: United Kingdom
- Police: Hampshire and Isle of Wight
- Fire: Hampshire and Isle of Wight
- Ambulance: South Central

Griggs Green is a hamlet in the East Hampshire district of Hampshire, England. It is in the civil parish of Bramshott and Liphook. It is 1 mile (1.7 km) west of Liphook, just south of the A3 road.

The nearest railway station is 1.3 miles (2.2 km) southeast of the village, at Liphook.
