= Bramshott and Liphook =

Civil parish in Hampshire, England

Coordinates: 51.0885°N 0.8035°W

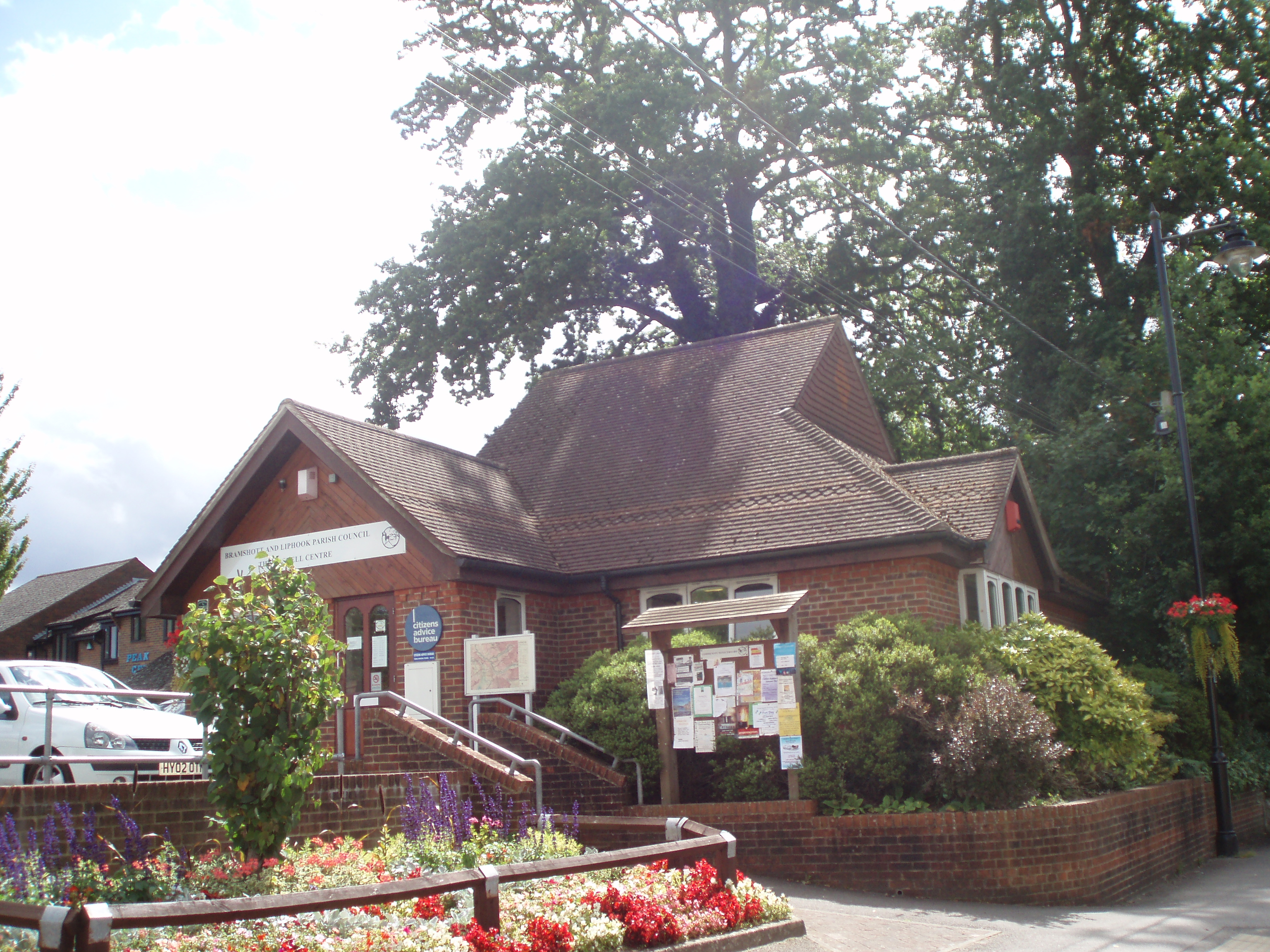
- Council office, Liphook

- Location within Hampshire
- Population: 8,491 (2011 census)
- Civil parish: Bramshott and Liphook
- District: East Hampshire
- Shire county: Hampshire
- Region: South East
- Country: England
- Sovereign state: United Kingdom
- Website: Official website

Bramshott and Liphook, formerly just Bramshott is a civil parish in the East Hampshire district, in Hampshire, England, on the main route from London to Portsmouth. Formerly local government was solely in the hands of the ecclesiastical parish, but in the 19th century became a separate, civil, entity. The parish includes the village of Bramshott, the larger village of Liphook and several smaller settlements, as well as a considerable area of mixed woodland and heathland.

== Geography ==
The civil parish sits astride the London to Portsmouth route that has been used for centuries for travel between the two cities, now designated the A3. The parish covers an area of 6,540 acres (2,650 ha) and comprises the villages of Bramshott and Liphook and the smaller settlements of Griggs Green, Conford, Passfield, Hammer Bottom (also called Hammer Vale), Ludshott Common and Waggoners Wells, and a large area of mixed heathland and woodland. Its population in 2011 was 8,491. It is at the border of three counties: Hampshire, Surrey and West Sussex, with a maximum elevation of 700 feet (210 m) above sea level and is roughly bisected by the River Wey. Parts of the parish lie within the South Downs National Park.

== History ==
Bramshott was a medieval manor, mentioned in the Domesday Book of 1086 with a small population and two mills. Bramshott Manor house, dating from the 13th century is a Grade II* listed building. There were associated manors of Chiltlee and Ludshott, both of which live on as more modern listed houses. The main London to Portsmouth road, subsequently the A3 road, originally passed through Bramshott, but Liphook became the major stopping point with the development of facilities there, such as the Royal Anchor hotel, a Grade II listed building. Samuel Pepys records three journeys by this road in May 1661, April 1662 and August 1668, on the last occasion staying in Lippock:

So to coach again, and got to Lippock, late over Hindhead, having an old man, a guide, in the coach with us; but got thither with great fear of being out of our way, it being ten at night. Here good, honest people; and after supper, to bed.

By the 18th century the legitimacy of the ecclesiastical parish as the foundation of local government came into question, and the perceived inefficiency inherent in the system became a source for concern and civil parishes became established as the non-religious standard; thus Bramshott (and Liphook) civil parish would take roughly the same geographical area as its ecclesiastical counterpart.

The origin of Liphook as a village is unclear, and it was never a separate parish, but it appears on 17th century maps. As a developing coaching stop on the London to Portsmouth highway, and subsequently served by a railway stop, Liphook outgrew the older village of Bramshott. However, in Samuel Lewis's 1831 Topographical Dictionary of England, Liphook was still referred to as a hamlet in the parish of Bramshott.

From 1894 until 1974, the parish was in Petersfield Rural District. On 24 April 1974 the parish was renamed from "Bramshott" to "Bramshott & Liphook".

== Governance ==
There are 12 elected councillors and monthly meetings are open to the public; elections are held every four years. The parish office is in Liphook and there are permanent staff serving a range of functions. The parish council has a range of responsibilities and powers prescribed by government. The council published a neighbourhood plan in 2020.

== Listed buildings ==
The parish contains 49 listed structures, including Bramshott parish church, several tombs and memorials, and other medieval and later buildings.

== See also ==
- List of civil parishes in Hampshire
