= Joanna Hardy =

British jewellery consultant and broadcaster

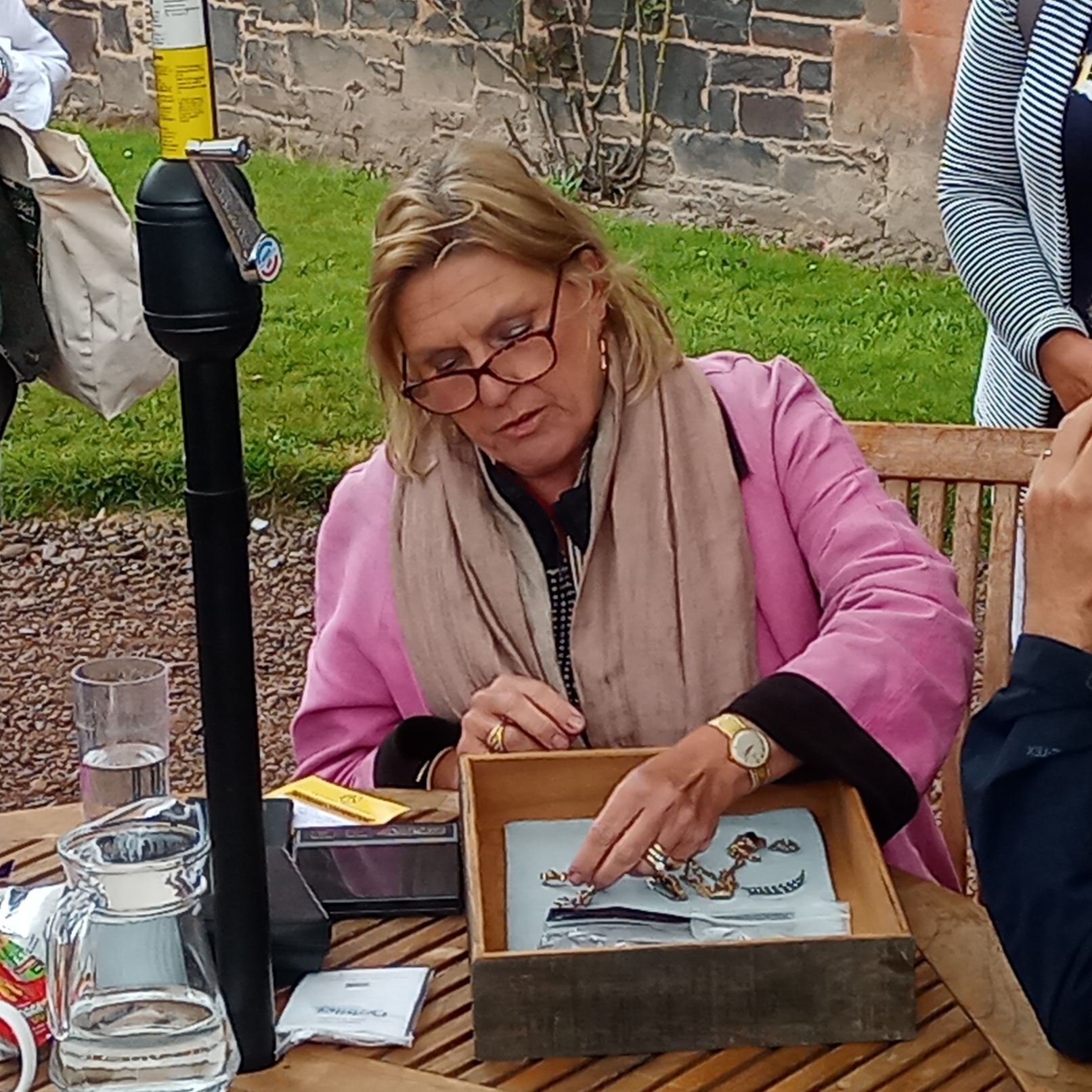
- Joanna Hardy at Thirlestane Castle's Antiques Roadshow in 2024
- Born: November 9, 1961 (age 64)
- Education: Bedales School; Sir John Cass College
- Occupations: Jewellery consultant TV host
- Known for: Antiques Roadshow (TV host)

Joanna Hardy (born 9 November 1961) is a British fine jewellery specialist, dealer and broadcaster who is a regular on the BBC's Antiques Roadshow and is on the board of the Gemmological Association of Great Britain.

== Life ==
Joanna was born in 1961 in London. Her godmother, Margaret Biggs, was the first woman to pass her gemmology exam to become a Fellow of the Gemmological Association of Great Britain. She passed that with distinction in 1923. She was also President of the National Association of Goldsmiths. Joanna's father, John, was a businessman in the juke box and slot machine industry.

Joanna learned to love making things at her father's workshop and every holiday, as a child, she worked at one of his businesses. She went to prep school in the village of Liphook where she was Headgirl in her final year. At 13, Joanna enrolled at Bedales School. She was not a natural academic, but she took a strong interest in design. She left after her first year in the sixth form because she was keen to learn more.

Hardy initially trained as a goldsmith at Sir John Cass College before she worked grading rough diamonds for the De Beers company. She worked in a number of countries including Israel, Belgium and Scandinavia. The diamonds were then all cut by hand and she could look at a gem and tell where it had been cut by the angles of the cuts. She went through a rigorous process to appreciate the authenticity and value of a pink diamond gem that was finally auctioned by Phillips and sold at $6 million in 1995.

She joined BBC's television's Antiques Roadshow in 2007 when she was working for the auctioneers Sotheby's.

In 2014 she cautioned collectors when it was observed that coloured gemstones were the fashion rather than diamonds. Some of the value and interest was due to fashion, but Hardy noted that the gems were rare and that was the underlying reason why they achieved high prices. However many gems were heat-treated to give an unoriginal colour.

Hardy is a member of the board of the Gemmological Association of Great Britain in 2024 and the fourth Warden of the Worshipful Company of Goldsmiths.

== Publications ==
- Hardy, Joanna (15 May 2012). Collect Contemporary: Jewelry. Thames & Hudson. ISBN 978-0500288559.
- Hardy, Joanna; Self, Jonathan (4 February 2014). Emerald: Twenty-one Centuries of Jeweled Opulence and Power. Thames & Hudson. ISBN 978-0500517208.
- Hardy, Joanna (19 December 2017). Ruby. Thames & Hudson. ISBN 978-0500519417.
- Hardy, Joanna (9 November 2021). Violette, Robert (ed.). Sapphire: A Celebration of Color. Thames & Hudson. ISBN 978-0500024775.
