= Old Thorns Manor Hotel =

Hotel and leisure resort in Hampshire, England

Coordinates: 51.0749°N 0.8322°W

The Old Thorns Hotel and Resort is a hotel and leisure resort in Hampshire, England, close to Liphook and the A3 trunk road.

The Old Thorns estate (which later become a hotel, golf and leisure resort) was previously the property of Ken Wood, inventor of the Kenwood food mixer, in the late 1950s. It was another 24 years before a golf course was constructed on the 400-acre site.

Commander John Harris was commissioned to build the golf course in the 1970s but his death meant that the task was passed to Peter Alliss and Dave Thomas. The new design team had just completed the Lansdowne and Brabazon courses at the Belfry so were regarded as rising stars in this field.

Once completed, a course launch was arranged involving Bill Rogers, Jack Nicklaus, Seve Ballesteros and Isao Aoke.

== Present day ==
The course and attached hotel was acquired by the Shaw family in 2007, the previous developers of Dunston Hall and Ambassador Hotel (both in Norwich). Old Thorns underwent further development to include increased accommodation, conference and banqueting facilities and a large health spa facility.

In 2013, UCF Chinese investment group purchased the 400-hectare estate from the Shaw family. Further investment in facilities and accommodation followed, including the development of 50 apartments on site.
