= Conford =

Village in Hampshire, England

Coordinates: 51.0918°N 00.8258°W

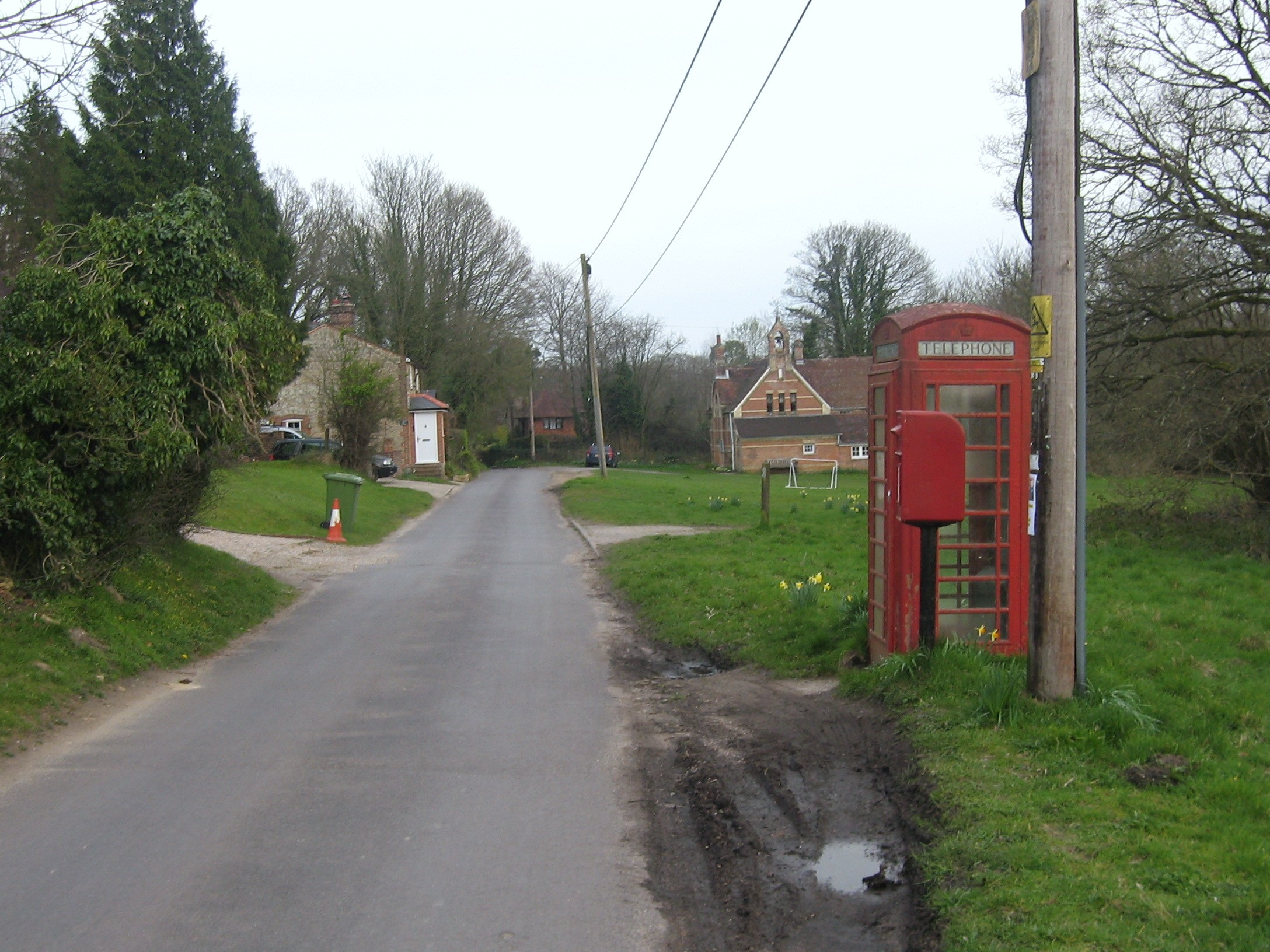
- Conford

- Location within Hampshire
- OS grid reference: SU8232
- Shire county: Hampshire
- Region: South East
- Country: England
- Sovereign state: United Kingdom
- Post town: LIPHOOK
- Postcode district: GU30
- Dialling code: 01428
- Police: Hampshire and Isle of Wight
- Fire: Hampshire and Isle of Wight
- Ambulance: South Central

Conford is a hamlet in the civil parish of Bramshott and Liphook. It lies between the villages of Liphook and Lindford in Hampshire.
