= Edmund Mervin =

16th century English priest

Edmund Mervin was a 16th century English priest.

Mervin was educated at Corpus Christi College, Oxford. He held livings at Bramshott and Sutton. He was appointed Archdeacon of Surrey by Edward Wedlake on 18 December 1556 and deprived by Queen Elizabeth in 1559.
