= Charles Sandbank =

British electronics engineer

Professor Charles Peter Sandbank FBKSTS FInstP FREng FRSA FRTS (14 August 1931 – 15 December 2008) was a British electronics engineer.

== Early life ==
Sandbank was born in Vienna in 1931. He attended Bromley Grammar School (now the Ravensbourne School). He graduated in physics at London University and specialised in electronic engineering for a postgraduate diploma at Imperial College.

== Career ==
From 1955 to 1960 he worked in electronics at the Brimar Valve Company, a pioneering electronics company. In 1960 he moved to Standard Telephones and Cables (STC), working in electronics, where he developed some of the earliest semiconductor integrated circuits in Europe.

From 1978 to 1984, he was head of BBC Research in Surrey. From 1984 to 1991, he was deputy director of engineering at the BBC.

At the BBC he worked on the BBC Micro computer project and digital television.

He was a member of the British Kinematograph, Sound and Television Society and the Society of Motion Picture and Television Engineers.

== Personal life ==
He married in 1955 and had two twin daughters and a son. He lived in Reigate, Surrey, with his wife Audrey, and in Beccles, Suffolk. He enjoyed boating and sailing, spending many summers on the Norfolk Broads with his family and friends. He had eight grandchildren.
