= Bohunt School =

Coordinates: 51.07728°N 0.8061°W

Location
- Longmoor Road; Liphook, Hampshire, GU30 7NT; England

Information
- School type: Academy Academy converter
- Motto: Enjoy, Respect, Achieve
- Established: 1978
- Status: Open
- Local authority: Hampshire County Council
- Trust: Bohunt Education Trust
- Department for Education URN: 136643 Tables
- Ofsted: Reports
- Principal: Neil Strowger
- Teaching staff: 121
- Gender: Coeducational
- Age: 11 to 18
- Enrolment: 1800
- Language: English
- Houses: 6
- Colours: Black, White & Bottle Green.
- Website: www.bohunt.hants.sch.uk

Bohunt School is a coeducational secondary school and sixth form located in the rural village of Liphook, Hampshire, England. The school was opened in 1978 by then Secretary of State for Education, Shirley Williams.

== History ==
In 2009 the BBC reported that Bohunt students had achieved higher than the national average at GCSEs in four years. and had ranked mid-table in Hampshire on the proportion of pupils achieving the Level 2 threshold .

Bohunt was designated a Language College, which meant that it specialised in modern foreign languages and all pupils took at least one GCSE. Bohunt offered Spanish, German, French, Japanese and Mandarin. In 2005 Bohunt was credited with an International School Award.

Previously a foundation school administered by Hampshire County Council, in April 2011 Bohunt School converted to academy status. The school is sponsored by the Bohunt Education Trust.

In 2014 Bohunt School was awarded TES Overall School and Secondary School of the Year at the TES Awards.

=== Bohunt Chinese School ===
Bohunt Chinese School was an experiment that took place at the school in 2015. The experiment involved fifty Year Nine students at the school being educated by Chinese teachers using traditional Chinese teaching methods for a period of four weeks. This included mostly lecture-based teaching and 12-hour shifts at school.

At the end of the experiment, the academic achievement of the 50-pupil group that received Chinese education was compared with an equivalent group of their peers through an assessment carried out by an independent board by a peer review. In the assessment, pupils in the Chinese-educated group performed 10% better than their other peers in maths, science, and Mandarin.

This experiment was broadcast by the BBC as part of a three-episode documentary.

== Catchment ==
Bohunt's main intake comes mostly from four schools known as the 4-16 Partnership. These are Liss Junior School, Liphook Church of England (controlled) Junior School, Greatham Primary School and Grayshott Primary School. Bohunt also draws from other primaries in Hampshire, Surrey, and Sussex.

== Houses ==
The pupils are split up into a house system, consisting of six houses, each taking the name of an important person. These are:

- Attenborough House after David Attenborough
- Curie House after Marie Curie
- Hawking House after Stephen Hawking
- Nightingale House after Florence Nightingale
- Parks House after Rosa Parks
- Turing House after Alan Turing

== Notable alumni ==
- Steve Brine, Conservative Party politician, Member of Parliament for Winchester

== See also ==
- Bohunt Chinese School
