= Mary Anne Robb =

British botanist, horticulturist and plant collector (1829 - 1912)

Mary Ann Robb (née Boulton; 1829–1912) was a 19th-century English botanist, horticulturalist and botanical collector. The perennial plant Euphorbia amygdaloides var. robbiae is named in her honour. Robb helped make this plant popular in British gardens. She owned property in London as well as Chiltley Place in Liphook where she designed and created a garden. Robb was also an artist. Her drawings are held in the Library and Archives at the Royal Botanic Gardens, Kew.

== Life ==
Mary Anne Robb was born in 1829, and grew up in Oxfordshire. Her paternal grandfather was engineer and businessman Matthew Boulton, based in Birmingham, but her father Matthew Robinson Boulton moved the family south to the Tew Park estate in Great Tew, Oxfordshire. Robb was the youngest of six children, and was educated privately. She married Captain John Robb in 1856, and was widowed two years later. They had two sons together.

Robb was a botanist, horticulturalist and botanical collector. She was friends with Francis Galton and Charles Ellis. She purchased 150 acres at Chiltley Place in Liphook where she designed and created a garden. Robb is known for deterring trespassers from her gardens using a sign warning them to beware of the Lycopodium, a moss. She donated specimens from her gardens to the collections at Kew, and also collected plant specimens while travelling in Ithaca, learning about the native flora from Theodor von Heldreich, a German botanist who was previously director of the Athens Botanical Garden.

The perennial plant Euphorbia amygdaloides var. robbiae is named in her honour. Robb helped make this plant popular in British gardens. It was reported that the plant was originally collected near Istanbul in Turkey, and transported back to England in Robb's hatbox, earning it the common name Mrs. Robb's Bonnet. Robb was also an artist. Her drawings are held in the Library and Archives at Royal Botanic Gardens, Kew, along with a number of watercolours by a Chinese painter of Chinese conifers, collected on her travels.

Robb died in 1912. Her Liphook garden was not maintained during World War I and the estate was broken up and sold in 1929.
