= Kenwood Limited =

British kitchen appliances manufacturer

- Type: Subsidiary
- Industry: Manufacturing
- Founded: 1947; 79 years ago as The Kenwood Manufacturing Company in London
- Founder: Kenneth Wood
- Headquarters: Havant, United Kingdom
- Area served: Worldwide
- Key people: Mark Welch (Chief executive officer)
- Products: Kitchen appliances
- Parent: De'Longhi Group
- Website: kenwoodworld.com

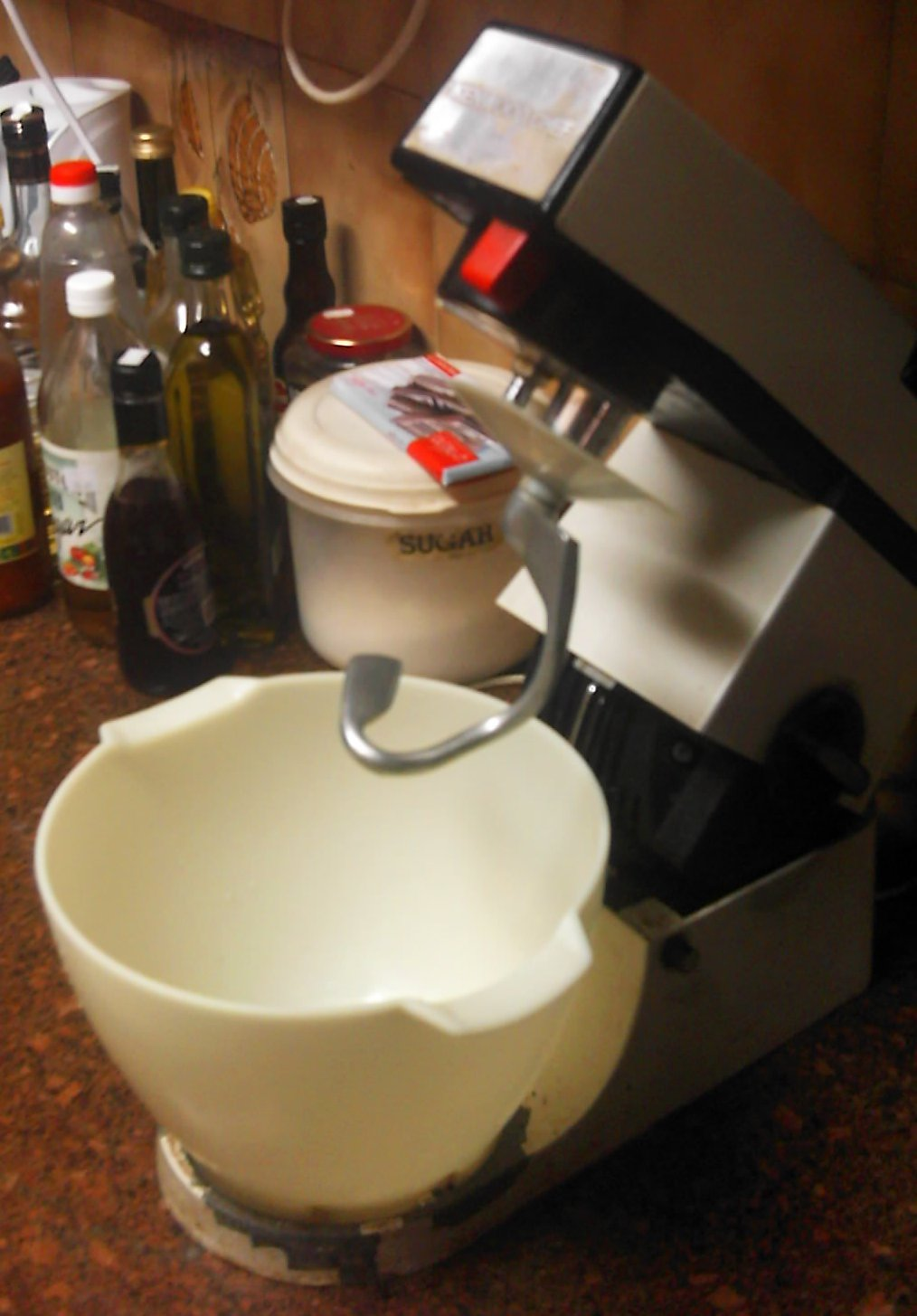
A Kenwood Chef

Kenwood Limited is a British kitchen appliances manufacturer based in Havant, Hampshire. Kenwood designs, produces and sells kitchen appliances including stand mixers, blenders, food processors, fridge freezers, kettles and toasters.

The company was founded by Kenneth Maynard Wood in 1947 in the town of Woking at 79 Goldsworth Road. In 1962 the company moved to Havant where they currently maintain operations.

== History ==
1940s

The first Kenwood product was a toaster invented by Kenneth Wood, which was brought to market in 1947, known as the A100.

1950s–1960s

Three years later in 1950, the first version of the Kenwood Chef Kitchen machine was launched at the Ideal Home Exhibition.

1970s–1980s

The company's first food processor was launched in 1979. In 1989, the business invested in its first factory in China.

1990s – present

In 1997, at the age of 81, Kenneth Wood died following a short illness.

In 2001, Italian rival small appliance maker De'Longhi bought the Kenwood company for £45.9 million (about $66.7 million).

The Kenwood Chef's original designer, Kenneth Grange, was knighted in 2013 for his services to design.

== Products ==
Kenwood's products include the following categories:

- Kitchen machines
- Food and drink preparation (Food processors, blenders, juicers)
- Breakfast (Kettles, toasters, coffee makers)
