= Kenwood Chef =

Food mixer

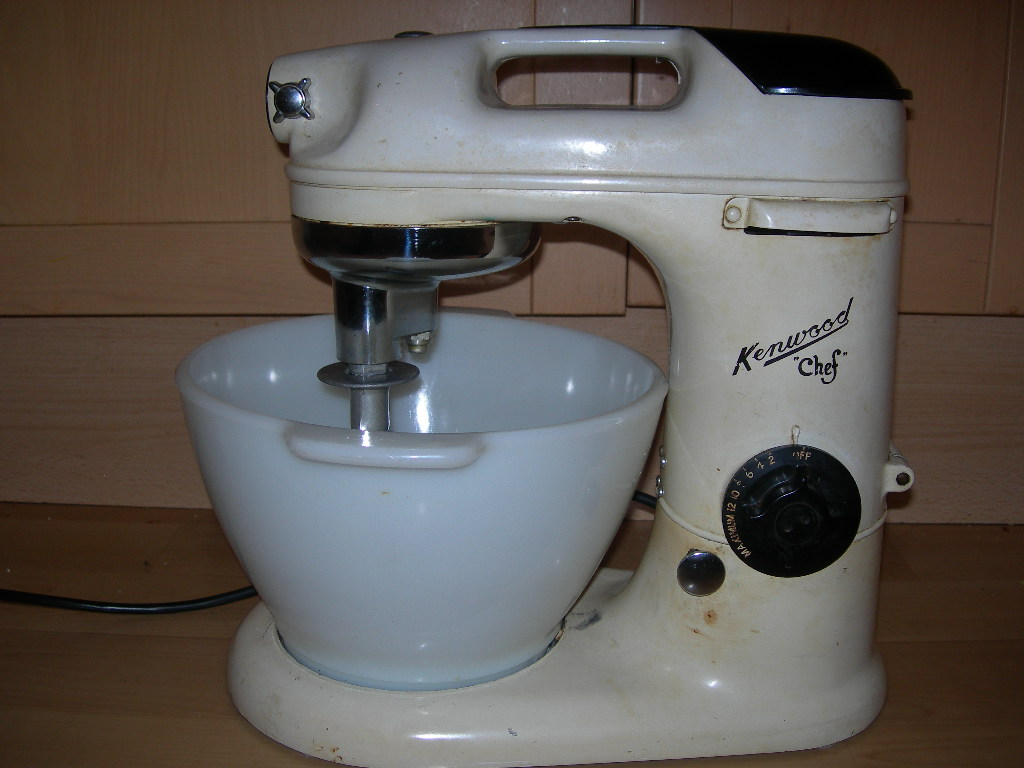
Model A700D Kenwood Chef, produced in the late 1950s

The Kenwood Chef is a food mixer developed by Ken Wood in Britain. It is a single machine with a number of attachments that allow it to perform many functions. The Chef, based on the earlier A200, was introduced in 1950. Kenwood mixers, along with most other Kenwood products were originally manufactured in the UK by Kenwood Limited (not to be confused with the Japanese Kenwood Corporation which manufactures audio equipment). The Chef Mixer was an instant success in the UK and is still Kenwood's top seller today.

== Overview ==
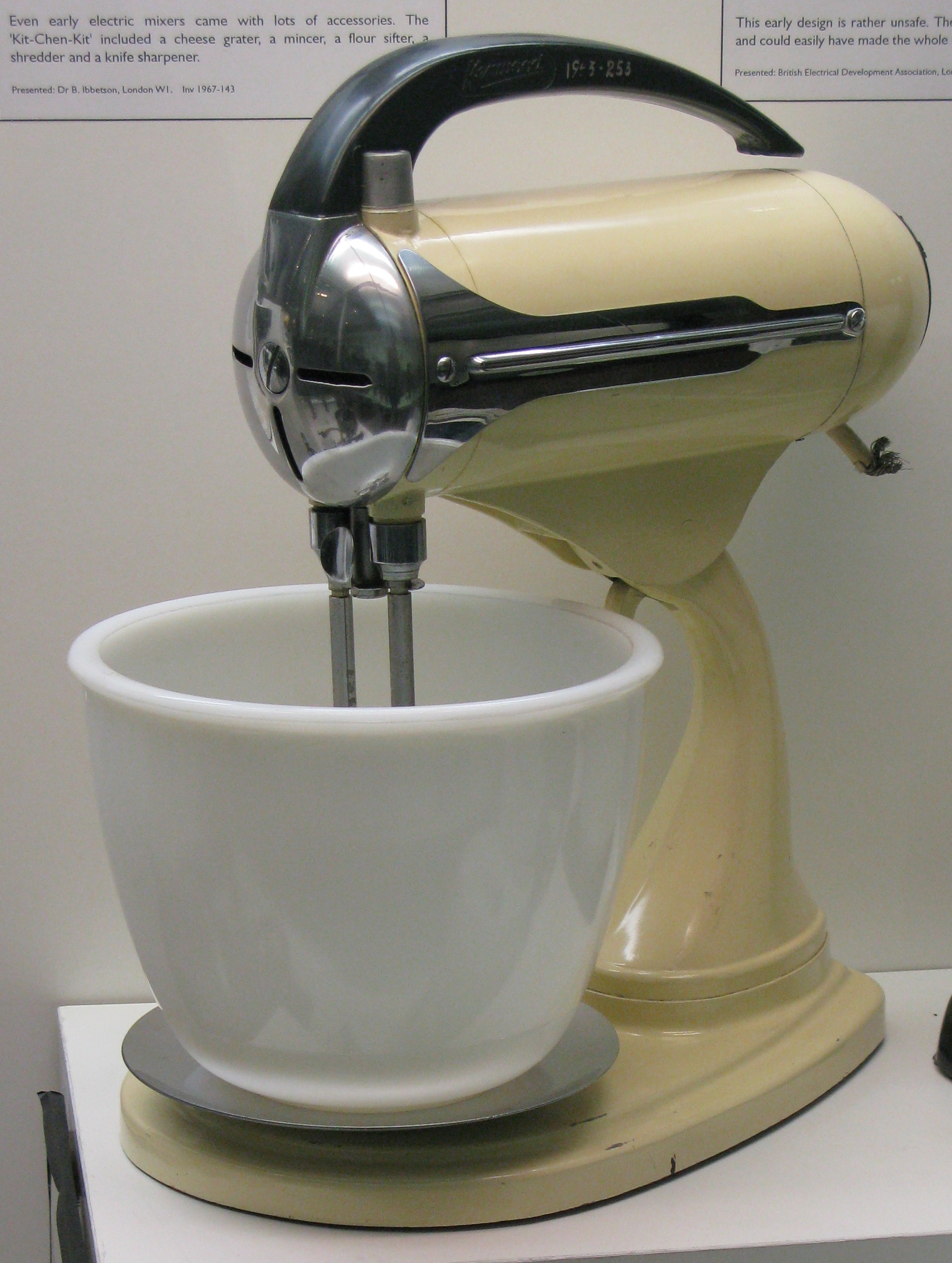
1948 model

Kenneth Maynard Wood, with his friend Roger Laurence, began trading as Woodlau Industries Ltd in 1947. His aim was to produce luxury items that would quickly be seen as necessities. He began marketing a toaster (Model A100) and a food mixer with two beaters (Model A200). The original mixer marketed as "The Kenwood Electric Food Mixer", designed in 1947 was very similar (possibly too similar) to the Sunbeam Mixmaster Model 3, an American mixer made between 1936 and 1939, and he faced serious competition and possibly objection. He completely redesigned the mixer, which was then launched at the Ideal Home Exhibition in London in March 1950. This mixer was no longer just a mixer, as he had added several other functions, and so he called it the Kenwood Electric Chef. It sold for £19 10s. 10d. (£19.54).

Since it was first introduced, the basic Kenwood Chef design has changed little with most changes being cosmetic. The A700 was the first model launched on the market in 1950 at the Ideal Home Show, then superseded by the A700D with minor cosmetic differences and internal updates. In 1960 the Chef was redesigned by Kenneth Grange as the familiarly shaped A701 series. It was introduced in white or cream with grey trim, which was superseded in 1963 by white and duck egg blue, and then in 1969 by white and dark blue. Other standard and special versions of the A701 had different colours, mostly orange and brown, or light blue and dark blue..

The A703C, of which few were made ( in Australia) , was based on the A701A but looked similar to the later A901; it had a semi-electronic speed control the same as the A901.

The A701C, having the same design as the A703C (Made by Kenwood Argentina S.A.) was the first fully electronic Kenwood mixer(non centrifugal) and had an improved motor.

During the mid-1970s the A901 series replaced the A701. The shape was basically the same but with a slightly more streamlined appearance. The design of the machine was entirely new. The Chef was designed for multi-functionality and simplicity of use. Its planetary action (which ensured the beater or whisk reached the outer parts of the mixing bowl) and various motor outlets for attachments made it very versatile. Kenwood's 1976 attachments for the Chefs included mincers, slicers, coffee mill, sausage making attachment, shredders, bean slicer and pea huller, can opener, liquidiser, potato peeler, cream maker and juice extractor.

The original A901 had a redesigned centrifugal speed controller, replaced in the A901P (Chef Deluxe) by the new electronic speed control first seen on the A703C. The standard A901 was white with black trim, the "Super Chef" orange with brown trim, and the "Chef Deluxe" in beige with brown trim costing about £10 more. These more expensive models came with a stainless steel bowl (also sold as an optional extra, specifically for pastry making) instead of the standard plastic bowl. In around 1983 a white with silver and maroon trim "Chef Excel" with slight changes in appearance was introduced. Later Excel models were white with light blue trim, and finally all white.

In 1997, a Special Edition KM500 SE was launched to celebrate 50 years of Kenwood. The model, based on a KM200 but with an all-metal top arm, was finished in Aubergine with a special 'limited edition' plate with unique number, and a stainless steel mixing bowl. The packaging also contained a special booklet detailing the history of Kenwood.

In 2004 the redesigned KM001 series was introduced, different both mechanically and in appearance. Models in this series had an extra power outlet which enabled them to use a wider range of over 20 attachments. The first Titanium series- KM001 was manufactured in UK and future models moved to Chinese manufacture.

The 2006 range consisted of six different Chef models, differing mainly in power.

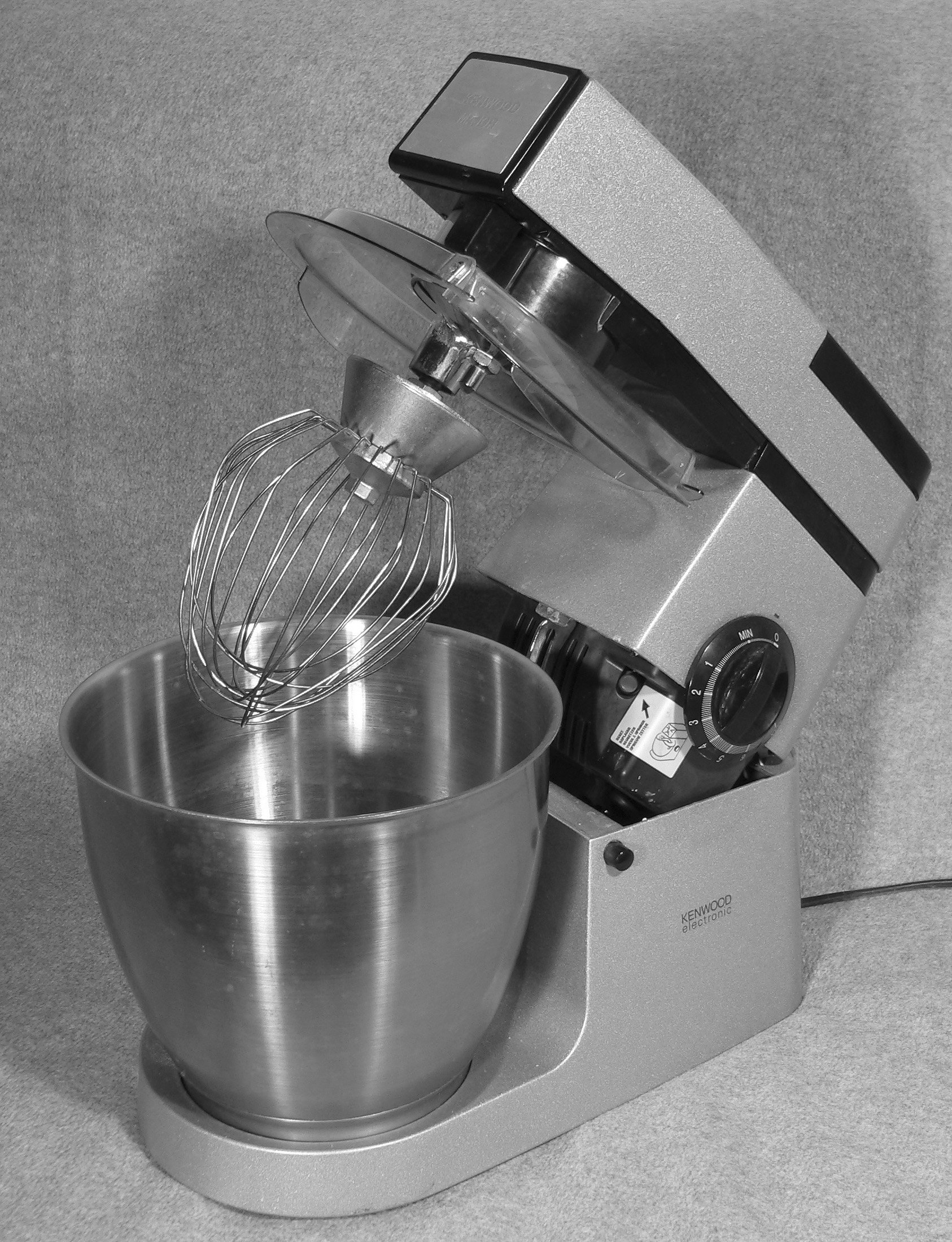
Recent model Kenwood Major, with stainless steel bowl

The Kenwood Major (sometimes incorrectly referred to as the "Chef Major"), a larger model of similar general appearance to the Chef models came with a 6-litre bowl of the same diameter but taller than the Chef's 4.6-litre bowl, was also produced. The Kenwood Major had special versions specially made for commercial use.These included extra features as required by increased Health and Safety requirements, such as no-voltage dropout 'Start' and 'Stop' buttons in addition to the standard speed control/off dial, and a safety guard above the bowl. There was also a version which had a cook-and-stir function, known as the "Cooking Chef" but had the bowl size of a Major type machine.

Both the Chef and Major have four attachment points:

- High speed outlet (top rear) for liquidiser and soft foods mill.
- Medium speed outlet (top middle) for citrus extractor.
- Low speed outlet (front) for mincer, hard foods mills, pasta makers etc.
- Orbital hub for beaters, potato peeler or ice cream maker.

The newer Classic Chef and Chef Premier do not have the medium speed outlet.

A much smaller model (which does not resemble the Chef or Major at all), the Kenwood Chefette, has also been produced. The Chefette is basically a hand-mixer on a stand, and for the A340 version the bowl rotates by the action of the tools and food rotation. Later versions may have a power driven bowl. Liquidiser and coffee grinder attachments are available for it.

== Compatibility ==
The auxiliary outlets are standard for all A700 machines, and were then updated for the A901. Some attachments for the A701 look very similar to those for the A901 but have a different fitting: they are not compatible and cannot be adapted. Older attachments for the A701 that may be found second-hand say on the box that they are for "All Chef and Major Models", true at the time but no longer so.

There are three designs of shaft fitting into the orbital hub

- Cross-cut slot at top (very old machines only). A700, A700D. A701.
- Bayonet with circular spring ("circlip beater"). A701A, A901/E/P, KM200/300/400/560 series and Titanium KM001/003
- Bayonet without circular spring (recent machines). KM010 KVC series.

Early A706 Major models had another fitting, whereby the tool slid into a groove on the socket on the planet hub, after which a metal sleeve would drop down over the socket ensuring the beater stayed in place.

A further complication is that, due to its extra height, any accessory fitted to the orbital hub of the Major must be longer than its Chef counterpart, so Major and Chef attachments for this hub are incompatible. This includes beaters, which need to reach to the bottom of the bowl, potato peeler, ice cream maker and others.

== Attachments ==
Many attachments (e.g. coffee grinder, slicer and shredder, cream maker, grain mill, liquidiser, tin opener, potato peeler etc.) are available.

All models in the A700 and A900 series were supplied with the "K-Beater" (for standard mixing, beating, and folding), dough hook, and whisk as standard. Some models (particularly the "Super Chef" and "Chef Deluxe") included the liquidiser attachment (which in some models was made of glass and in others plastic). A much-needed splash-guard cover for the bowl was introduced for the Chef in the early 1980s; before this, there was a tendency for ingredients such as flour to be thrown from the open-top bowl, especially if too high a speed was used before they were mixed in.

The contemporary Kenwood Cooking Chef includes all the following attachments in its purchase price as standard: K-Beater, power whisk, spiral dough hook, stirring tool, flexi beater, food processor, steamer basket, and blender.

== Other brands ==
The kitchen machine remains very popular across the UK and Europe, and is slowly working into the US market where the KitchenAid, which is a similar kitchen tool, has a greater market share.

In North America, the DeLonghi DSM5 and DSM7, and the Kenmore Elite Kitchen Machine (re-badged DSM5), are the same appliance as the Kenwood Chef and accessories are interchangeable between them. There is also a Hamilton Beach badged variant based around the KM800 Major.
