= Passfield =

Village in Hampshire, England

Coordinates: 51.103078°N 0.823453°W

- Location within Hampshire
- OS grid reference: SU8247234411
- Civil parish: Passfield
- District: East Hampshire
- Shire county: Hampshire
- Region: South East
- Country: England
- Sovereign state: United Kingdom
- Post town: LIPHOOK
- Postcode district: GU30 7
- Police: Hampshire and Isle of Wight
- Fire: Hampshire and Isle of Wight
- Ambulance: South Central
- UK Parliament: East Hampshire

Passfield is a small village in the East Hampshire district of Hampshire, England. It is in the civil parish of Bramshott and Liphook and lies approximately 1.6 miles (2.6 km) north-west from Liphook and 2 miles (3.2 km) south-east from Bordon. The village was once a main crossing point between Liphook and Petersfield, which gives its name 'Passfield'.

== Local features ==
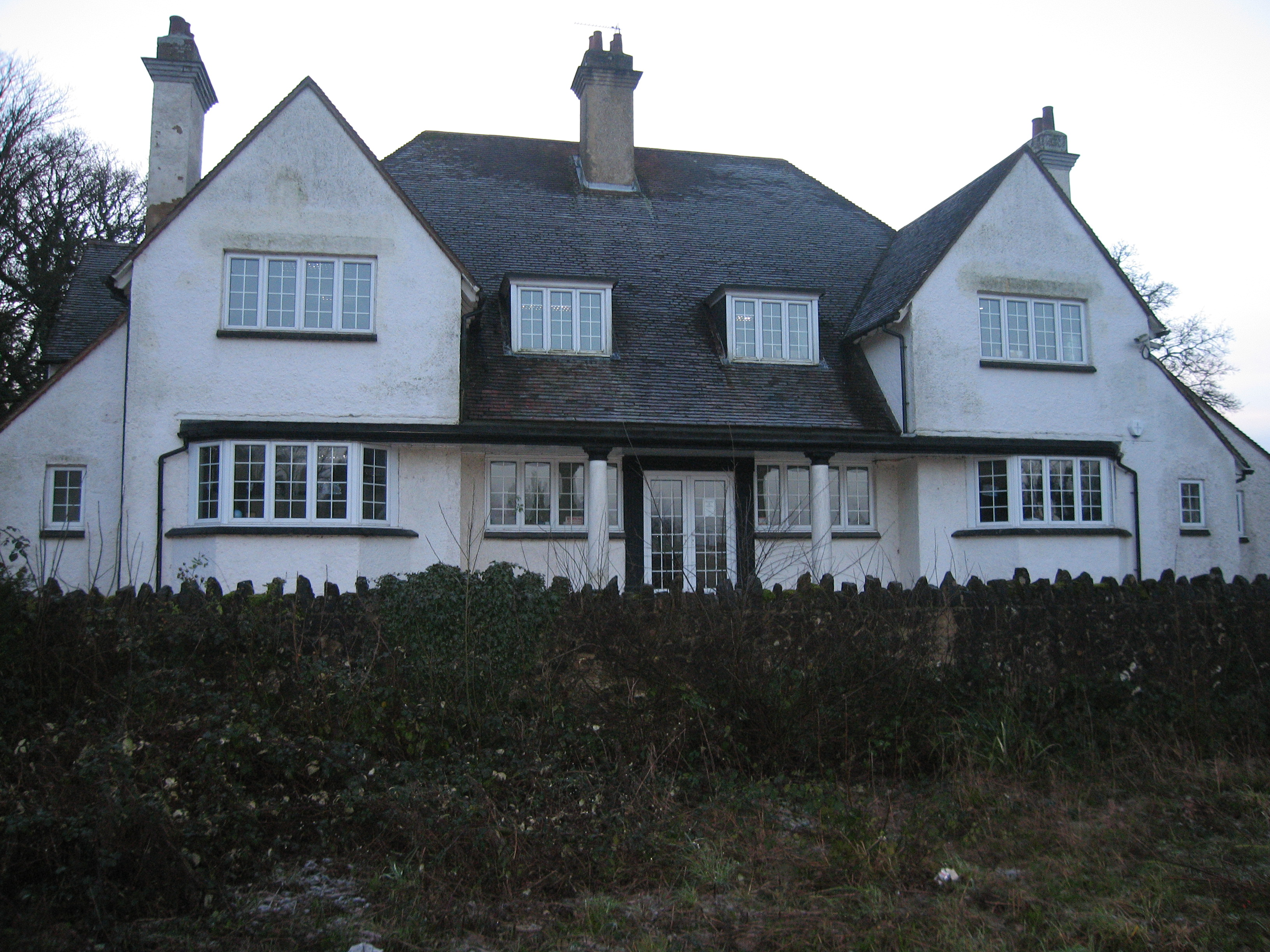
The former Passfield Oak pub

The village has a store, a business centre, a village hall and formerly a pub, The Passfield Oak.

=== Passfield Common ===
Passfield Common is 187 acres (76 ha) of woodland and common under the care of the Woodland Trust.
