= Forest Mere =

Site of Special Scientific Interest

Coordinates: 51.062°N 0.833°W

- Site of Special Scientific Interest
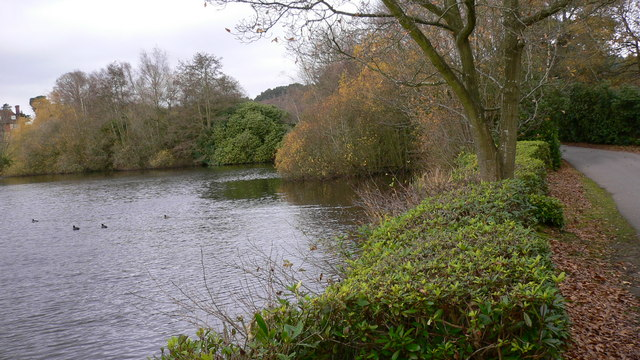
- Location of Forest Mere.
- Area of search: West Sussex
- Grid reference: SU 819 298
- Interest: Biological
- Area: 14.6 hectares (36 acres)
- Notification date: 1984
- Location map: Magic Map

Forest Mere is a 14.6-hectare (36-acre) biological Site of Special Scientific Interest north of Midhurst in West Sussex.

The site consists of Folly Pond and surrounding woodland, heath and bog. Natural England describes it as notable for its outstanding assemblage of dragonflies, with 17 species recorded, and 49 breeding birds, including heath and woodland species such as European stonechat, wood warbler and tree pipit.

The site is private land but it is crossed by a public footpath.
