= Liphook railway station =

Railway station in Hampshire, England

Coordinates: 51.071°N 0.800°W

Liphook
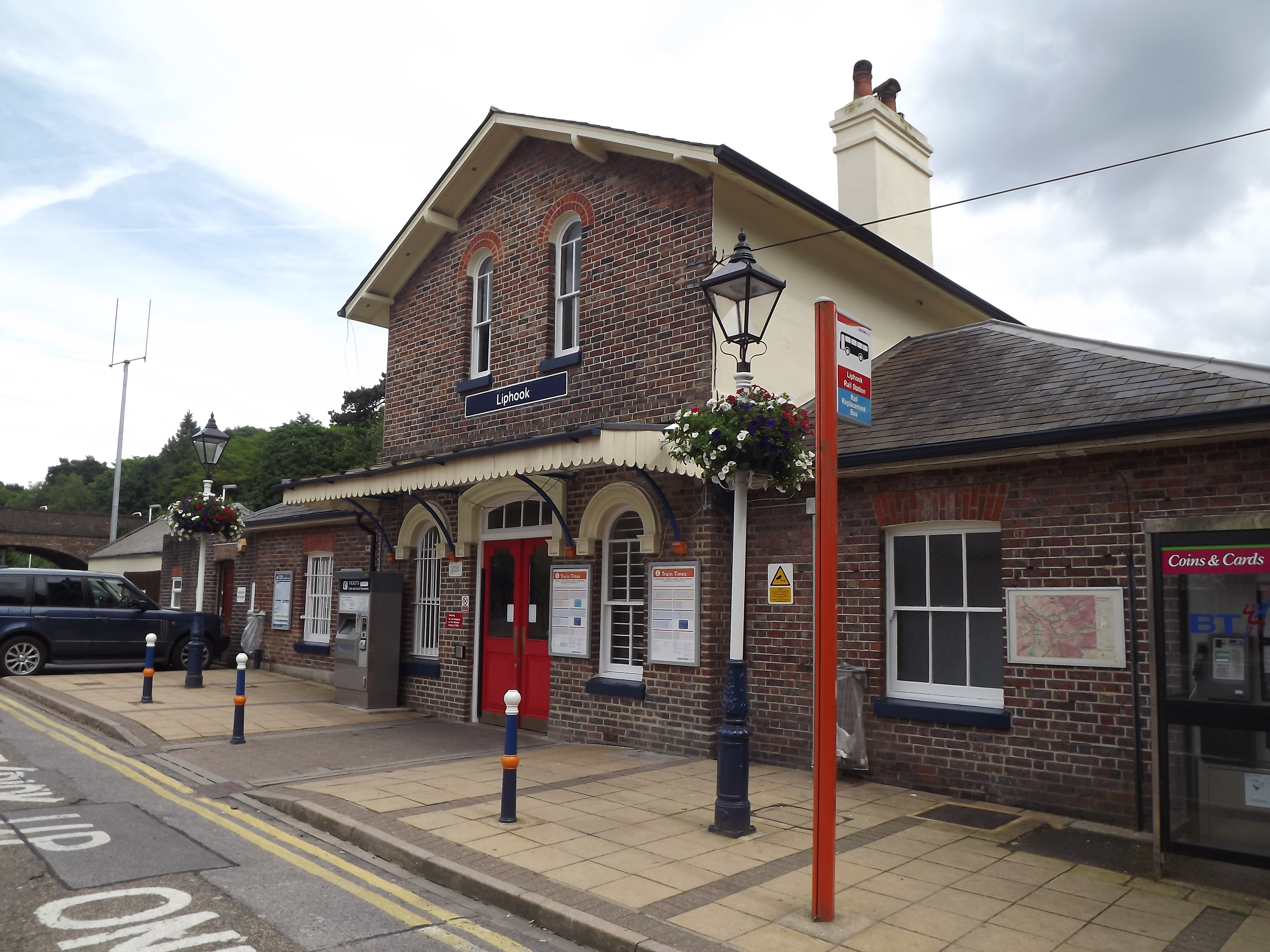

General information
- Location: Liphook, East Hampshire; England
- Grid reference: SU841309
- Managed by: South Western Railway
- Platforms: 2

Other information
- Station code: LIP
- Classification: DfT category D

History
- Opened: 1 January 1859

Passengers
- 2020/21: ▼0.283 million
- 2021/22: ▲0.462 million
- 2022/23: ▲0.525 million
- 2023/24: ▲0.548 million
- 2024/25: ▲0.609 million
Location
Notes
- Passenger statistics from the Office of Rail and Road

Liphook railway station serves the large village of Liphook, in Hampshire, England. It is on the Portsmouth Direct Line, 46 miles 67 chains (75.4 km) down the line from London Waterloo via Woking. The station is managed by South Western Railway, who operate all trains serving it.

== History ==
In 2020, South Western Railway was issued with an improvement notice by the Office of Rail and Road as it did not supply a ramp for wheelchair users despite it being mandated by law.

In August 2020, planning permission was given to replace the station footbridge. In January 2021, work began to replace the footbridge with a new covered bridge with lifts. The new bridge was opened in September 2021 with the lifts opened shortly after.

== Services ==
All services at Liphook are operated by South Western Railway using Class 444 and 450 EMUs.

The typical off-peak service in trains per hour is:

- 1 tph to London Waterloo via Guildford
- 1 tph to Portsmouth & Southsea

During the peak hours, there are additional services to London as well as services to Portsmouth Harbour. There is also one late evening service to Southampton Central.

Preceding station	National Rail	Following station
Haslemere	South Western Railway Portsmouth Direct Line	Liss
