= Raman Patrick Sisupalan =

English footballer

Patrick Sisupalan
Personal information
- Full name: Raman Patrick Sisupalan
- Date of birth: 4 July 1980 (age 46)
- Place of birth: England
- Height: 5 ft 10 in (1.78 m)
- Position: Midfielder

Senior career*
Years	Team	Apps	(Gls)
2009–2010	Viva Kerala		

Managerial career
- 2010–2012: Petchey Academy
- 2012–: Kovalam FC
- * Club domestic league appearances and goals as of 09:44, 20 November 2010 (UTC) ‡ National team caps and goals as of 09:44, 20 November 2010 (UTC)

Raman Patrick Sisupalan is an English former professional footballer who is currently working as foreign coaches liaison at Kovalam FC of the Kerala Premier League. He played as a midfielder and last played for Viva Kerala FC of the I-League as a player of Indian origin.

== Personal life ==
Born in England, Sisupalan began his football career in London and spent some years teaching at Alexandra Park School before moving to India to play professional football. He also worked at the Petchey Academy and at Northumberland Park Community School.

== Club career ==
During his early career, he played football for University of Rio Grande and futsal for FC White Bear. He later switched to football predominantly, as his professional career.

=== Viva Kerala ===
He signed for Kerala-based I-League side Viva Kerala in 2009. Under the coaching of A M Sreedharan, he was all set to be debuted for Viva Kerala in the IFA Shield in Kolkata, against East Bengal FC. But later, the club withdrew from the tournament due to failure to register players on time and Sisupalan missed the debut opportunity.

== Managerial career ==
From 2010 to 2012, Sisupalan managed the soccer team of Petchey Academy in Kingsland School, Dalston, East London.

Sisupalan is currently in the managing committee of the Kerala Premier League outfit Kovalam FC from 2012. He works as a foreign coaches liaison in the Thiruvananthapuram-based side. He along with Ebin Rose, coordinates the training facilities of the Kovalam FC, which is currently set up in the newly formed stadium at Arumanoor near Neyyattinkara.
