= Barbara Burford =

Medical researcher, civil servant and writer (1944–2010)

- Born: 9 December 1944; Jamaica
- Died: 20 February 2010 (aged 65)
- Education: Dalston County Grammar School; University of London
- Scientific career
- Fields: Medicine
- Workplaces: University of Bradford

Barbara Yvonne Veronica Burford (9 December 1944 – 20 February 2010) was a British medical researcher, civil servant and writer. She was born in Jamaica and moved to the United Kingdom at the age of 10. Burford attended Dalston County Grammar School and studied medicine at the University of London.

== Biography ==
=== Early years ===
Burford was born in Jamaica on 9 December 1944 and was raised there by her grandmother until the age of seven. In 1955, Burford moved to London with her family, where she attended Dalston County Grammar School, which later became Kingsland Secondary School. The school is now known as Petchey Academy and specialises in health, care and medical science. Burford described herself as a "descendent of three different diasporas: African, Jewish and Scots", as well as claiming her lesbian identity.

=== Medical career ===
Burford joined the National Health Service in 1964 as a specialist in electron microscopy at postgraduate teaching hospitals. She later began working at the Institute of Child Health and Great Ormond Street Hospital in a team with Sheila Haworth. Haworth was a professor of developmental cardiology at the Institute of Child Health and was in 2006 appointed Commander of The Most Excellent Order of the British Empire for services to the National Health Service.

=== Writing ===
Burford was an active writer, having written plays, short stories, poems, and science fiction stories. The 1980 anthology A Dangerous Knowing: Four Black Women Poets, to which Burford was a contributor, was the first anthology to be published in the field of black British women's writing. The anthology was described in the academic journal Hecate as "a gift" and a "testimony to the depth of Black feeling and the complex power inherent in Black love".

Burford's 1984 play Patterns was commissioned by Changing Women's Theatre. The play focused on women's labour and was performed at the Oval Theatre in London.

The Threshing Floor (1986), an eponymous novella and collection of short stories, features in many school and college reading lists across the United Kingdom, and individual works from the collection have been republished in other anthologies. Burford's writing was included in the anthology Daughters of Africa (ed. Margaret Busby, 1992).

Burford's works were selected multiple times by the journal The Women's Review of Books as works that readers of the journal might find interesting.

=== Equality and diversity ===
In 1999 Burford was appointed Director of Equality for the Department of Health, a post she held until 2002.

Burford assisted with the creation of Bradford's healthcare apprenticeship scheme, led by Bradford University, which is credited with helping transform the diversity of the city's healthcare workforce.

Burford was awarded an honorary doctorate in 2001 from the University of Bradford to recognise her contributions to equality and diversity. After her retirement in 2005, Burford became the first deputy director of the university's Centre for Inclusion and Diversity.

=== Death ===
Burford died of respiratory failure on 20 February 2010.

== Legacy ==
The University of Bradford set up an annual lecture in memory of Burford known as the Barbara Burford Annual Memorial Lecture, given as part of the international annual Making Diversity Interventions Count conference. In honour of her work, the annual lecture is given by an expert from the field of equality and diversity.

The Barbara Burford Honour (Excellence in STEM) was founded in 2017 by British magazine Gay Times as part of the Gay Times Honours, a series of honours to recognise LGBT individuals who have made a difference in their field. The inaugural Barbara Burford Honour was won by Rachel Padman, a transgender astrophysics lecturer from the University of Cambridge.

Barbara Burford's personal papers are currently housed at the Lesbian Archive in the Glasgow Women's Library. It contains several drafts of her creative writing, including the feminist science fiction novellas Elysian Fields and The Trooping of the Colour.

== Publications ==
Plays

- Patterns (1984)

Poems

- A Dangerous Knowing: Four Black Women Poets (1980)
- Dancing the Tightrope: New Love Poems by Women (1987) ISBN 978-0-7043-4060-2

Short stories

- The Threshing Floor (1986) ISBN 978-0-932379-27-6
