= Aldridge Foundation =

- Founded: 10 January 2006
- Type: Multi-academy trust
- Registration no.: 05670663 (Aldridge Education)
- Purpose: Education
- Location: 8 City Road, London, EC1Y 2AA
- Key people: Brent Thomas
- Website: www.aldridgefoundation.com

The Aldridge Foundation is a British charity. It is based in London.

The Aldridge Foundation was registered as a charity in 2006 by Sir Rod Aldridge, after he retired from the business he founded, Capita. Over 10 years it developed a family of sponsored academy schools in England. In 2016 it established Aldridge Education, a multi-academy trust and the body now responsible for Aldridge schools, which educate students from primary to secondary and sixth form level. All of the schools are non-selective. The Trust is also a co-sponsor of a University Technical College, which has university and employer lead sponsors.

== Aldridge Education schools ==
All Aldridge schools are regularly inspected by Ofsted. Alongside this, the Aldridge Foundation have also developed their own 'Quality Framework' which is used to support performance improvement.

The schools are:

- Darwen Aldridge Community Academy (opened in 2008)
- Brighton Aldridge Community Academy (opened in 2010)
- Portslade Aldridge Community Academy (opened in 2011)
- Darwen Aldridge Enterprise Studio School (opened in 2013)
- Kensington Aldridge Academy (opened in 2014)
- Darwen Vale High School (an Aldridge academy since December 2014)
- Sudell Primary School (an Aldridge academy since March 2015)
- Duke's Aldridge Academy (an Aldridge academy since September 2017)

In 2015, Darwen Aldridge Community Academy was named the Lancashire Telegraph's Secondary School of the Year and in the same year was one of twelve schools from across Europe which won the Entrepreneurial School of the Year Award.

== University Technical Colleges ==
- UTC@MediaCityUK, Salford (opened September 2015)

=== Former colleges ===
- UTC@harbourside, Newhaven, East Sussex (opened September 2015, closed July 2019)
