= Falmer (disambiguation) =

Falmer is a village, near Brighton, in the ceremonial county of East Sussex in the United Kingdom.

Falmer may also refer to:

- Falmer, a fictional race of elves in the fantasy game series The Elder Scrolls
- The Falmer Stadium, a stadium near the village of Falmer, used by Brighton and Hove Albion football club

== See also ==
- Falmer railway station
- Falmer High School
