= Duke's Aldridge Academy =

Location
- Trulock Road; Tottenham, London, N17 0PG; United Kingdom; 51.6046°N 0.0636°W

Information
- Type: Academy
- Motto: Inspire to Excel
- Established: 1972
- Local authority: Haringey
- Trust: Aldridge Education
- Department for Education URN: 144900 Tables
- Ofsted: Reports
- Principal: Ms Bessa
- Gender: Mixed
- Age: 11 to 16
- Colours: Turquoise and white
- Publication: Duke's News
- Website: www.dukesacademy.org.uk

Duke's Aldridge Academy (formerly Northumberland Park Community School) is a co-educational secondary school in the Northumberland Park ward of Tottenham in the London Borough of Haringey, United Kingdom.

The school offers GCSEs and BTECs as programmes of study for pupils.

The school site is next to Tottenham Hotspur F.C.'s newly built Tottenham Hotspur Stadium, which can be seen from the playground.

== History ==
Northumberland Park Community School was founded in 1972. There were delays in the construction of the school building in Trulock Road, so pupils were temporarily taught in former Tottenham County School buildings in Tottenham Green. The school eventually occupied its purpose-built site in 1977.

The inaugural Headmaster was Mr David Pert. Mr John Coughlan became Headmaster in 1997-2004, followed by Mr Andy Kilpatrick in 2005 (as Headteacher), and last Miss Monica Duncan in 2009 (who changed her title from Headteacher to Executive Principal in 2019). Kilpatrick received an OBE from HM The Queen for services to education after an incident in which he was attacked at knifepoint by a Year 10 pupil in 2008.

Northumberland Park underwent a number of building extensions over the years, including a renovation and redecoration programme of works as part of the Building Schools for the Future scheme.

The school had an attached provision for students in Years 12 and 13, Northumberland Park Community School Sixth Form, but this was closed in the early 2000s after being put into special measures by Ofsted. Following the opening of Haringey Sixth Form Centre in nearby White Hart Lane, Haringey Council closed all school sixth forms in the poor east of the borough (retaining those in the wealthy west of the borough) and declared all schools in the Tottenham and Wood Green to be designated feeder schools for the new sixth form centre.

Previously a community school administered by Haringey London Borough Council, in September 2017 Northumberland Park Community School converted to academy status and is now sponsored by the Aldridge Education Trust.

== Admissions ==
The school follows Haringey Council's admissions procedure.

In the event of oversubscription, priority is allocated first to students with Education, Health and Care Plans, then to children in care/Looked After Children, then to those with an exceptional social or medical need.

As the feeder school for new-arrivals in the United Kingdom for Haringey Council, pupils with refugee or asylum seeker status, or who do not speak English as a first language and are recently settled in the UK, are automatically admitted to the school.

== Performance and data ==
=== Exam results and school performance ===
The school suffered many years of poor examination results and was frequently in Ofsted special measures. However, in 2013 the school achieved its highest GCSE pass rate, with 41% of pupils achieving the required 5 GCSE or BTEC qualifications at grades A*-D. This means that 59% of pupils still do not achieve the minimum requirement as laid out by the Department for Education. However, the improved rate was celebrated at the time.

=== Demographics ===
Most pupils live near the school in areas of pronounced social disadvantage. Overall attainment on entry in Year 7 is very low in most years; the proportion of students on the school's Special Educational Needs register is well above average at 33%. The proportion eligible for free school meals is 81%, which is well above the national average and the highest in the London Borough of Haringey. As of the 2018/19 academic year, the parents of 48% of pupils had registered for additional school funding to tackle disadvantage through the Pupil Premium.

== Reputation and improvement efforts ==
=== Exam results and Ofsted inspection reports ===
The school suffered many years of poor examination results and was frequently in Ofsted special measures. However, by the mid-2000s the school had been rated as 'satisfactory' with several 'good' features.

=== Crime and safety concerns ===
The school has suffered from crime and anti-social behaviour on and around its premises since its foundation, but particularly from the late 1990s onwards. By the mid-2000s, knife-related incidents had become commonplace, including an incident which led to the departure of Andy Kilpatrick as Headteacher in which a knife was held to his throat by a Year 10 pupil. Kilpatrick later received an OBE for his work at Northumberland Park. According to a local authority report, several leading criminal figures were "cultivated" in the school, including Khalid Mohamed Omar Ali, the Whitehall terror suspect, and Reece Dempster, the murderer and rapist who received a life sentence, a rarity in the UK. The high prevalence of gang membership among the pupil body and within the wider local area of Tottenham also presents challenges for the school, with safeguarding concerns around how gangs operate within the school, exploiting younger pupils who join their ranks.

To help combat the violence on school premises, knife arch metal detectors were installed at all pupil entrances, and the Metropolitan Police began to maintain a permanent presence on site. The school had previously received visits from a dedicated schools police officer as part of the Safer Schools Partnership, which sees officers attached to local secondary schools, but this was short lived due to safety concerns.

=== School newspaper ===
Historically, there was a monthly school newspaper under the name 'Curamus', the Latin phrase which was the school's motto, written and edited by pupils. Curamus ceased to be printed some time in the late 1990s. The tradition of a school newspaper was revived in 2013 with the NPCS News, which is a termly magazine. However, NPCS News did not have pupil involvement as before, and was instead produced by the school's Marketing Officer and administrative staff. The magazine was renamed 'Duke's News' in 2018 to reflect the school's transition to academy status and membership of the Aldridge Education academy chain.

== Performing arts (school specialism) ==
The school was a designated specialist arts college under the UK specialist schools programme. In line with this subject specialism, pupils take part in a range of activities organised by the Music and Drama departments. Highlights include the annual Jamaican Independence Day assembly which features singing and steel pans.

=== Peripatetic lessons ===
Pupils at the school are able to learn to play instruments, including the Turkish Bağlama, Trinidadian and Tobagonian steel pans, and the recorder. The school subsidises some of the cost for pupils to learn to play these instruments as a result of its expressive arts subject specialism.

== Inclusion ==
At the school, the proportion of students on the school's Special Educational Needs (SEN) register is well above both the national and borough average at 33%. Pupils with disabilities and additional needs are supported in mainstream classrooms and follow the school's curriculum. Many of these students have English as an additional language, further complicating their learning difficulties. The school has been accused of off-rolling and permanently excluding pupils with SEN several times, most recently in the 2017/18 academic year. Under the leadership of a new Headteacher in 2009, the SEN Department was disbanded and replaced with a new 'Differentiation Department', much to the derision of staff, parents and pupils who felt that this would single out students with SEN as 'different'.

== Notable former pupils ==
- Gak Jonze, rapper
- Viddal Riley, boxer
- Wretch 32, rapper
- Letitia Wright, actress

== Notable former staff ==
- Jane Clarke, scientist
- Raman Patrick Sisupalan, footballer
- Alison Drake (Jankowska), diver

== The Vale School ==
The school shares part of its main building with The Vale School, a special school for pupils with complex medical needs. The Vale remains separate to Northumberland Park, sharing only its premises. Pupils from The Vale arrive and leave school at different times to Northumberland Park pupils, to avoid the crowds.

In 2013, The Vale School received a visit from HRH The Countess of Wessex to open a new outdoor garden designed to support pupils' physical development. The royal visit was attended by staff and pupils from the school, and the ceremonial Mayor of the London Borough of Haringey. In 2014, part of the garden was destroyed by pupils from Northumberland Park, but was rebuilt the following year by volunteers from several local charities as part of a 'community action day'.
