= Moselle Upper School =

Moselle School

Location
- Downhills Park Road; Tottenham, London, N17 6AR; England
- Coordinates: 51°35′16″N 0°05′20″W

Information
- Type: Community special school
- Local authority: London Borough of Haringey
- Specialist: General Learning Difficulty and Autistic Spectrum Disorder
- Department for Education URN: 102178 Tables
- Ofsted: Reports
- Chair: Pat May
- Head teacher: Sarah Doyle
- Gender: Coeducational
- Age: 11 to 16
- Enrolment: c. 60
- Website: http://www.lgfl.net/lgfl/leas/haringey/schools/moselle/

Moselle Upper School was one of the two sites of Moselle School, a school in Tottenham, in the London Borough of Haringey in North London, for children and young people with Special Educational Needs.

== History ==
Until July 2007, the Upper School catered for young people up between 14 and 19, but after September 2007, the sixth forms of Haringey's special schools were reorganised into a new sixth form centre in White Hart Lane, Tottenham (Haringey Sixth Form College), so that the upper age was lowered to 16. As of July 2009 the Upper School also includes two Key Stage 3 classes, reducing the lower age to 11.

As of November 2011 Moselle School was closed, and amalgamated into two new SEN schools, The Brook (primary) and Riverside School (secondary).
