= Portslade Aldridge Community Academy =

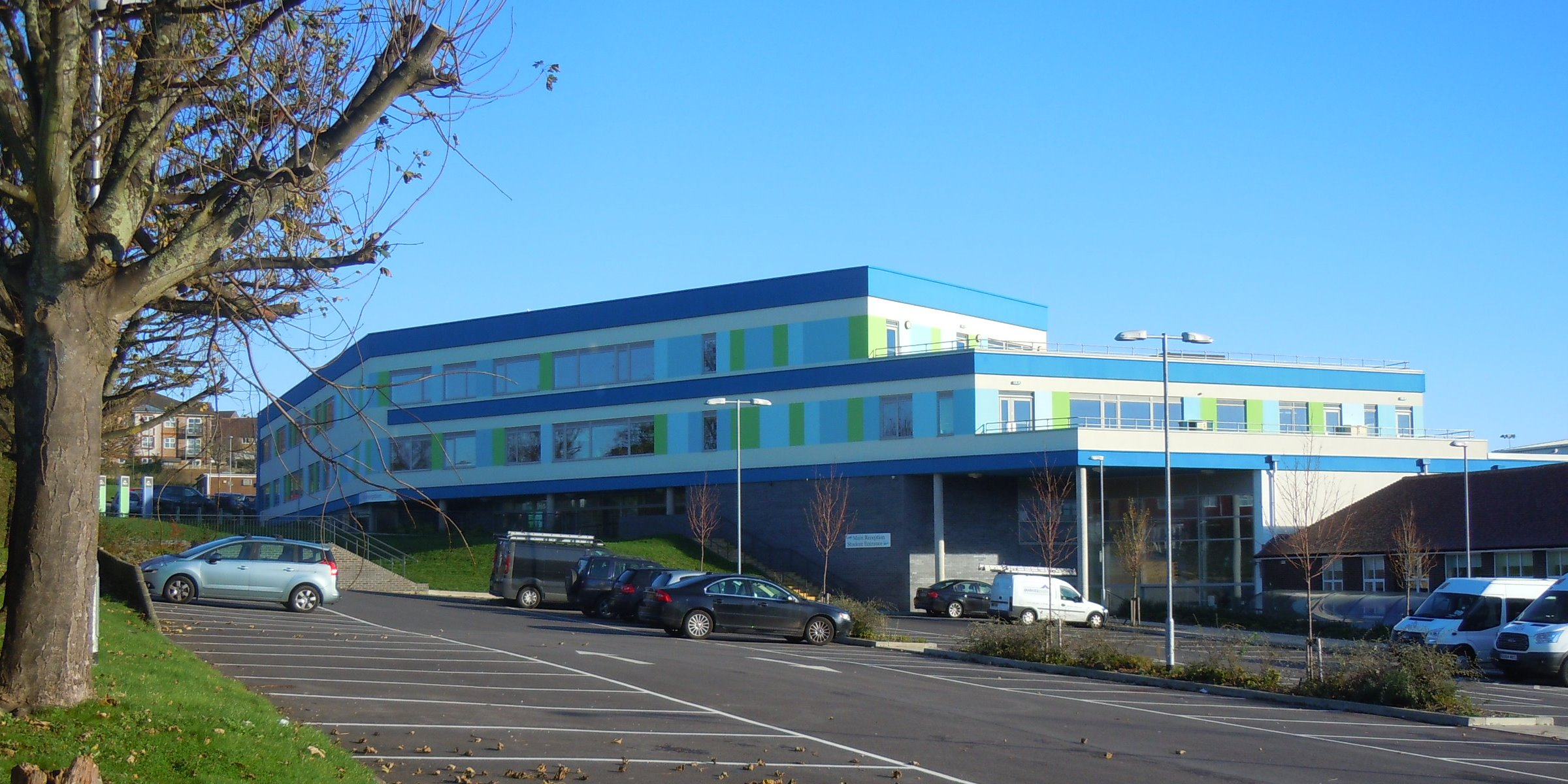

Location
- Chalky Road; Portslade, Brighton, East Sussex, BN41 2WS; United Kingdom; 50°51′02″N 0°13′33″W

Information
- Type: Academy
- Founder: Rod Aldridge
- Local authority: Brighton and Hove
- Department for Education URN: 137063 Tables
- Ofsted: Reports
- Principal: Mark Poston
- Gender: Coeducational
- Age: 11 to 16
- Website: paca.uk.com

Portslade Aldridge Community Academy (PACA) (formerly Portslade Community College) is a secondary school in Portslade, in the city of Brighton and Hove, England. The school has around 1000 pupils. It is part of the Aldridge Education multi-academy trust.

In June 2015 the Governors at Portslade Aldridge Community Academy announced the appointment of Mark Poston as the new Principal at PACA.

The school is involved in the Aldridge Cricket Academy which allows students from Brighton Aldridge Community Academy or Portslade Aldridge Community Academy to combine academic studies with an intensive cricket development programme.

== Location and history ==
Portslade Aldridge Community Academy is located on Chalky Road in Portslade. It was previously located over three sites, however £12.7 million was invested in extending the Chalky Road site to include a dance studio, community library, and STEM Centre, completed in 2014.

- Main school (Chalky Road site)

The Chalky Road site was previously known as Portslade Secondary Modern School for Girls, (circa 1947) and then later Mile Oak Girls School, (circa 1954). The school was renamed Portslade Community College in the 1970s, and was opened by Margaret Thatcher, while Secretary of State for Education.

=== Sixth Form Centre ===
PACA Sixth Form closed in 2019.

== Move to academy status ==
In 2009, an OFSTED inspection judged the overall effectiveness of the school "inadequate" and found that "Standards are exceptionally low". A further inspection led to the decision that the school required special measures.

The Aldridge Foundation, led by Rod Aldridge, expressed an interest in 2009 in sponsoring PCC to become an academy, in the same way that it had sponsored the academy at Falmer High School. This was approved by the Department for Education and finally agreed by the City Council in February 2011.

The council report proposing the closure of PCC to make way for the academy stated that to leave PCC unchanged was "not considered acceptable as in discussions with the DfE it has been agreed that the school requires significant structural change to improve the results achieved by the school". The sum of £12.7 million will be available to the academy which will enable the sixth form provision to be moved to the main site at Mile Oak, as well as providing new science facilities.

== Academic results ==
In 2015 they reported their best ever results with 60% of students achieving 5 GCSEs at grade A*-C including English and Maths, 78% achieving A* to C grades in English and 68% achieving A* to C grades in maths.

Previously, it had been as low as 25% of students achieved Level 2 (5+ A*-C) including English and maths GCSEs, in 2009, compared with 44% across all Brighton and Hove schools. In 2010, this had risen to 35%.

== Adult education ==
The adult education centre within the school was shortlisted, as one of four institutions, for an "Education Oscars" event organised by the Centre for Excellence in Leadership.

In 2006, 645 adult students gained a qualification with the school.
