= Falmer High School =

Location
- Lewes Road; Brighton, East Sussex, BN1 9PW; England; 50.859°N 0.091°W

Information
- Type: Community school
- Established: 1957
- Closed: 2010 (replaced by Brighton Aldridge Community Academy)
- Local authority: Brighton and Hove
- Department for Education URN: 114583 Tables
- Ofsted: Reports
- Gender: Mixed
- Age: 11 to 16
- Enrolment: 657
- Former name: Westlain Grammar School
- Former pupils: Old Westlainians

Falmer High School was a community mixed-sex non-denominational comprehensive school for pupils aged 11 to 16 in Brighton, East Sussex, England. It closed on 31 August 2010 and was replaced by Brighton Aldridge Community Academy on the same site, sponsored by Rod Aldridge.

== History ==
=== Grammar school ===
It was Westlain Grammar School and administered by the Brighton Education Committee. It opened as the Westlain Mixed Grammar School in 1957.

=== Comprehensive ===
It became a bi-lateral school in 1973 for ages 12–18 with 1,200 boys and girls, when it joined with Stanmer Secondary Modern School. It became administered by East Sussex Education Committee. By the late 1970s it was a comprehensive school. It became a school many parents from Brighton suburbs tried to avoid in the 1980s, as it served the council estates along Lewes Road, with some parents even going to court to stop their children attending the school.

Falmer School was awarded the Artsmark Silver in 2001 and Healthy School Status in March 2008.

=== Closure ===
Falmer High School was closed on 31 August 2010, replaced by the Brighton Aldridge Community Academy on the same site, sponsored by Rod Aldridge.

== Academic performance ==
At the time some of Brighton and Hove's schools were below average at GCSE, and Falmer High School was joint bottom with results below the government minimum with Portslade Community College.

== Alumni ==
=== Westlain Grammar School ===
- Dave Hill, professor and Trade Unionist and Socialist Coalition PPC for Brighton Kemptown
- Jenny Jones, Green Party member of the House of Lords and former Member of the London Assembly
- Gary Powell (actor), played Laurie Bates in EastEnders in the late 1980s

=== Former teachers ===
- David Lepper, Labour MP from 1997 to 2010 for Brighton Pavilion (taught from 1968–96)
- Prof Ian Spink, Director of Music from 1960–62
