= Brighton Aldridge Community Academy =

Location
- Lewes Road; Brighton, East Sussex, BN1 9PW; England; 50.859°N 0.091°W

Information
- Type: Academy
- Established: 1 September 2010
- Department for Education URN: 136164 Tables
- Ofsted: Reports
- Principal: Jack Davies
- Gender: Coeducational
- Age: 11 to 19
- Capacity: 813 (2024/25)
- Houses: Centaur, Gryphon, Pegasus, Minotaur
- Website: http://www.baca-uk.org.uk/

Brighton Aldridge Community Academy (BACA) is a coeducational academy school in Brighton. It opened on 1 September 2010 replacing Falmer High School.

It is part of the Aldridge Education multi-academy trust set up by founder and former executive chairman of business process outsourcing company Capita plc, Sir Rodney Aldridge who Peter Kyle MP, upon Kyle's resignation as chairman of BACA board of governors, described as "the spark that ignited this remarkable effort."

Dylan Davies became Brighton Aldridge Community Academy's second Principal succeeding Philomena Hogg on her retirement, taking up the role in January 2014. Davies left the role in 2018.

In October 2010 the school announced a partnership with Sussex Cricket League to promote cricket in the area. The Aldridge Cricket Academy was subsequently formed which allows sixth form students from Brighton Aldridge Community Academy or Portslade Aldridge Community Academy to combine A level studies with an intensive cricket development programme.

Brighton Aldridge Community Academy, Portslade Aldridge Community Academy and Latest TV jointly provide a digital media academy to students called the Brighton Digital Media Academy (BDMA), which launched in September 2015.

The school was rated "Good" in all categories by Ofsted in January 2017. An Ofsted inspection in March 2022 rated the school "Inadequate", the lowest rating. In 2023 it was rated "Requires Improvement" and in 2025 it was rated "Good" across all categories.

== Campus ==
The building was designed by architects Feilden Clegg Bradley and constructed by building firm Kier Group. The first phase of the new building was finished in September 2010 and all buildings were completed by September 2011.
