= Aldridge UTC@MediaCityUK =

AldridgeUTC@MediaCityUK

Location
- 100–102 Broadway; Salford, M50 2UW; 53°28′32″N 2°17′46″W

Information
- Type: University Technical College
- Motto: Unique. Technical. Creative.
- Established: 2015
- Department for Education URN: 146303 Tables
- Ofsted: Reports
- Chair of the Governing Body: Janet Lord
- Principal: Colin Grand
- Age: 14 to 18
- Enrolment: 300
- Website: www.utcmediacityuk.org.uk

AldridgeUTC@MediaCityUK is a University Technical College for students aged 13–18, as of 2024, the UTC has allowed 13 year olds to join for September at MediaCityUK Salford Quays, England. The college specialises in 3 topics, those being Film and TV, Game Design, and Digital Design. The UTC opened in September 2015 by BBC Director-General Tony Hall and BBC Presenter Chelsee Jade Healey and Lisa Riley and Founding Principal Ms Anne Casey. The UTC joined the Aldridge Foundation Multi Academy Trust in September 2018, and as of 2024, is still a part.

== Sponsors ==
The three key sponsors of the UTC are The Aldridge Foundation, The Lowry and the University of Salford.

== Admissions ==
Applications to join this September are open now on the website. Places are limited in both Year 10 and Year 12.

UTC@MediaCityUK opened with a total of 310 student places starting in Years 10 and 12.

Due to being a state funded school there are no admission fees or entry examination. Their catchment area varies from Salford (Zone A) all the way to Tameside (Zone C).

== Curriculum ==
Students choose one of three pathway specialisms at Key Stage 4: Pathway 1) TV and Film Production, Pathway 2) Interactive Media and Gaming or Pathway 3) Digital Design. All students in Key Stage 4 study GCSE English Language & Literature, GCSE Maths and GCSE Combined or Triple Science. Extra options are available from either GCSE Photography, GCSE Graphics, GCSE History, GCSE Computer Science, BTEC Media Studies or BTEC Digital Information Technology.

At Key Stage 5 students choose one of three pathway specialisms: Pathway 1) TV and Film Production, Pathway 2) Interactive Media and Gaming or Pathway 3) Digital Design. The pathway can be taken as a Triple or Double and paired with an A-Level in either Photography, Graphics, Media Studies or History.

The UTC specialises in digital and creative content, with employer partners playing a key role in the curriculum of the UTC by setting real life work experience projects. Through the projects, students study toward Level 2 and 3 qualifications.

== Governing Body ==
The governors are:

- Chair: Brent Thomas (Interim)
- Chenayi Mutambasere
- Colin Grand
- John McCarthy
- Nigel Howe
- Julia Fawcett OBE
- Jane Wood-Greaves - Staff Governor
- Nicky Hill - Staff Governor
- Vivien Chasey - Parent Governor
- Eloise Edwards - Parent Governor
- Rhyse Cathcart - parent governor

== Standards ==
A 2018 Ofsted inspection found that the UTC "requires improvement". Since joining the Multi Academy Trust there has not been an Ofsted Inspection.
