= Aldridge Cricket Academy =

Coordinates: 50.85830°N 0.09402°W

Aldridge Cricket Academy is a specialist secondary school academy based at Brighton Aldridge Community Academy and Portslade Aldridge Community Academy, in partnership with Sussex Cricket.

In October 2010, Brighton Aldridge Community Academy announced a partnership with Sussex Cricket to promote cricket in the area. The Aldridge Cricket Academy was subsequently formed which allows sixth form students from Brighton Aldridge Community Academy or Portslade Aldridge Community Academy to combine A level studies with an intensive cricket development programme.

== Campus ==
All ACA students complete their cricket training at the grounds of the Brighton campus. Construction on a new £1.8m cricket centre began in September 2015 and is due to be completed May 2016.
