= UTC@harbourside =

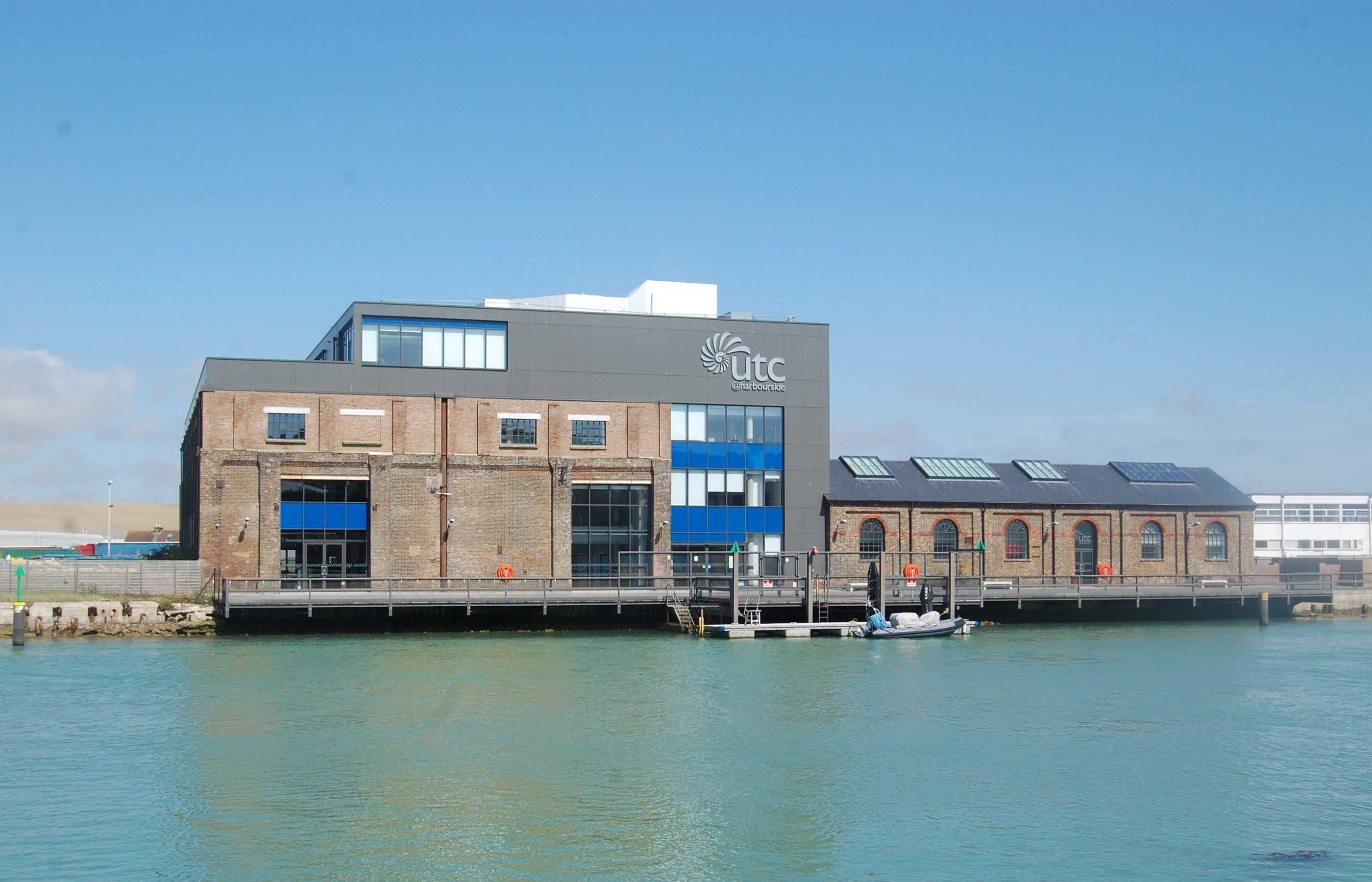
- UTC@Harbourside in July 2019, one week after closing

Location
- Railway Quay; Newhaven, East Sussex; United Kingdom; 50.7944°N 0.0536°E

Information
- Type: University Technical College
- Established: 2015
- Closed: 2019
- Department for Education URN: 141394 Tables
- Ofsted: Reports
- Principal: Adanma Umunna
- Age: 14 to 19
- Enrolment: 130
- Website: http://www.utc-harbourside.org/

UTC@harbourside was a University Technical College for students aged 14–18 (Key Stage 4 and 5) located in Newhaven, East Sussex, England which opened in September 2015. It specialised in science, technology, engineering and maths, leading to academic and vocational qualifications. The college closed in July 2019 due to financial issues and a lack of students.

The University Sponsor was University of Brighton, which also sponsors academy schools in Sussex through its Academies Trust. The Employer Sponsor was Veolia. The other sponsors were Aldridge Education and Lewes District Council.

Students came from Newhaven and across Sussex, including Brighton, Haywards Heath and Eastbourne.

Employer partners played a key role in the curriculum of the UTC by setting real-life enterprise challenges. The UTC offered GCSE, A-Level and BTEC qualifications. Its Technical Skills Centre offered Level 1 and 2 Diplomas for 16–19 year olds, and its Technical Learning Centre offered Diploma courses in Electrical Installation and Plumbing studies for the same age group. Adult Education courses were also offered.

The college's only Ofsted inspection was in 2018, with a judgement of Inadequate and a recommendation that the college be placed in Special Measures.

The college closed in 2019.
