= MediaCityUK =

Property development in Salford

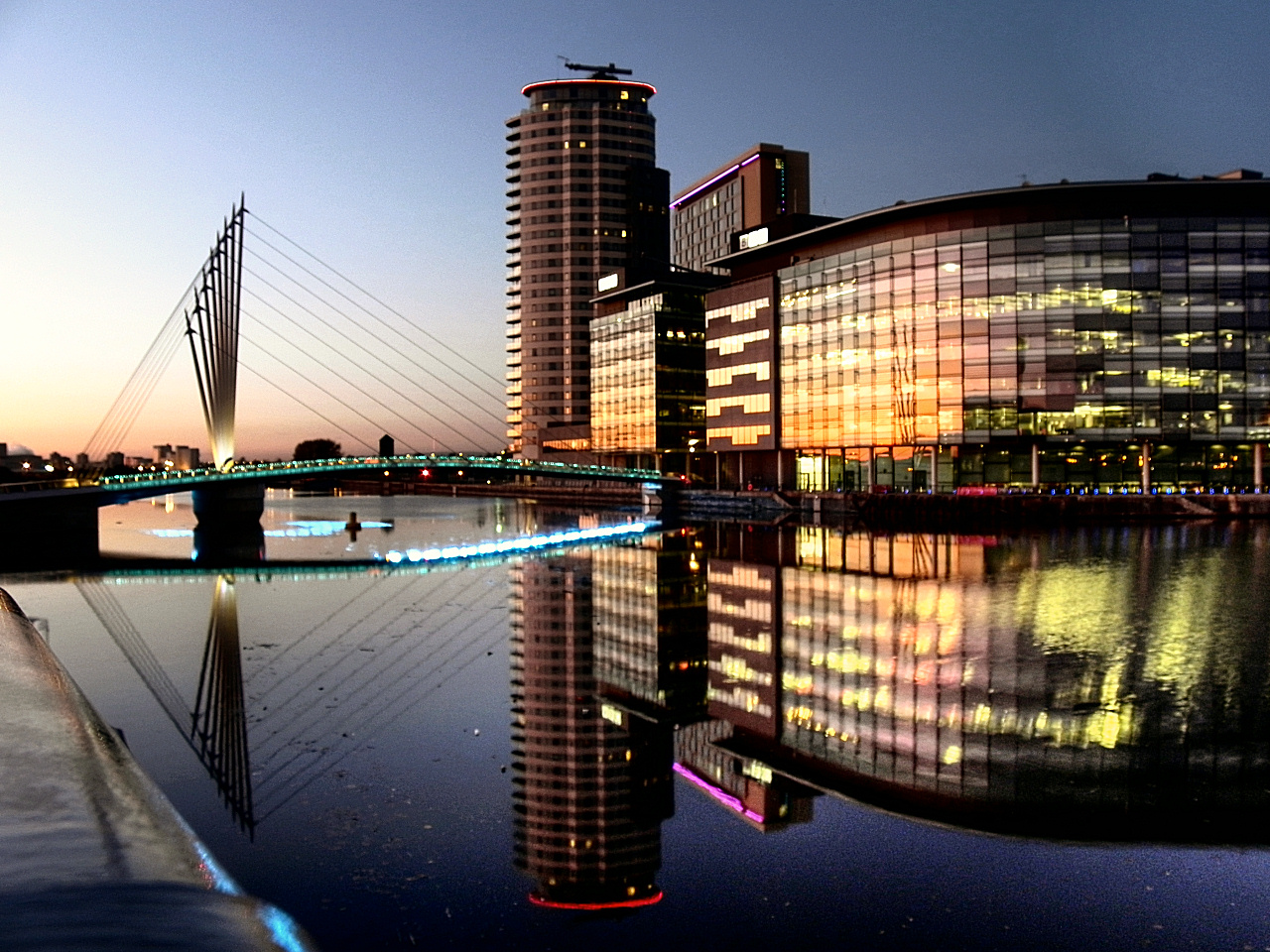
- View over the Manchester Ship Canal of the Media City Footbridge and BBC Offices

Project
- Developer: Peel Media
- Operator: Peel Media; BBC; ITV Studios; ITV Granada; NEP Connect; University of Salford; Warner Bros.
- Owner: Landsec
- Website: mediacityuk.co.uk

Physical features
- Transport: MediaCityUK

Location
- Location in Greater Manchester
- Coordinates: 53°28′22″N 2°17′50″W
- Location: Greater Manchester, England

MediaCityUK is a 200-acre (81 ha) mixed-use property development on the banks of the Manchester Ship Canal in the boroughs of Salford and Trafford, Greater Manchester, England. The project was developed by Peel Media; its principal tenants are media organisations and the Quayside MediaCityUK shopping centre. The land occupied by the development was part of the Port of Manchester and Manchester docks.

The BBC signalled its intention to move jobs to Manchester in 2004, and the Salford Quays site was chosen in 2006. The Peel Group was granted planning permission to develop the site in 2007, and construction of the development, with its own energy generation plant and communications network, began the same year. Based in Quay House, the principal tenant is the BBC, whose move marks a large-scale decentralisation from London. ITV Granada completed the first phase of its move to MediaCityUK on 25 March 2013, followed in two stages by the northern arm of ITV Studios: the second stage involved Coronation Street being moved to a new production facility on Trafford Wharf next to the Imperial War Museum North at the end of 2013. The Studios on Broadway houses seven high-definition studios, claimed to be the largest such facility in Europe.

MediaCityUK was developed in two phases; the 36-acre (15 ha) first phase was completed in 2011, and the second is dependent on its success. The site became Europe's first WiredScore Certified Neighbourhood in 2020, with all commercial buildings achieving either a WiredScore Platinum or Silver rating. Metrolink, Greater Manchester's light-rail system, was extended to MediaCityUK with the opening of the MediaCityUK tram stop on 20 September 2010 and further extensions are planned. Road access was improved by the construction of the Broadway Link Road.

== Location ==
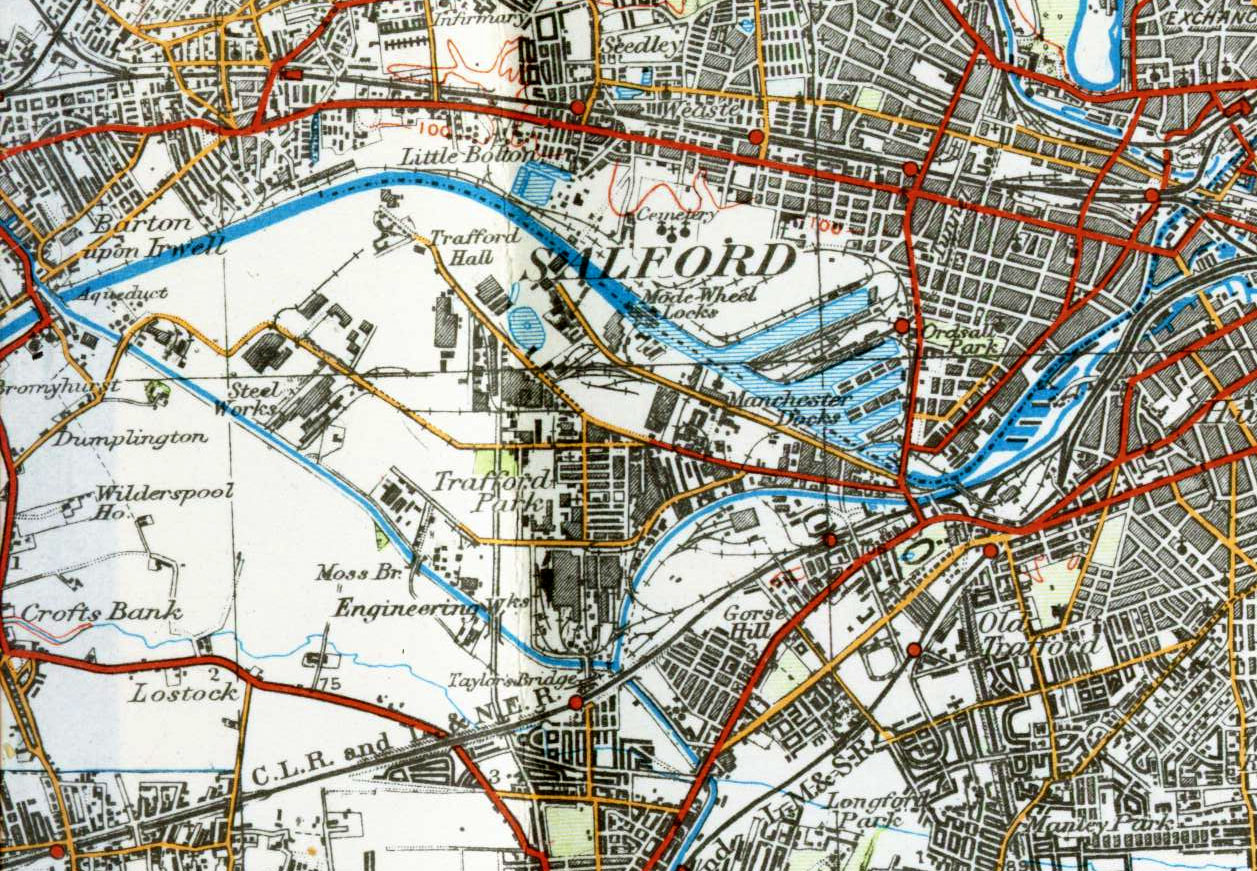
A 1924 map of Manchester Docks

Salford Quays, at the eastern end of the Manchester Ship Canal on the site of the former Manchester Docks, became one of the first and largest urban regeneration projects in the United Kingdom after the closure of the dockyards in 1982. MediacityUK, an area on both banks of the ship canal, is part of a joint tourism initiative between Salford City Council and Trafford Borough Council encompassing The Quays, Trafford Wharf and parts of Old Trafford. The Quays development includes The Lowry Arts Centre and the Imperial War Museum North.

A total of 200 acres (81 ha) of land was earmarked for the development of MediaCityUK. The first phase of its development was primarily focused on a 36-acre (15 ha) site at Pier 9 on Salford Quays. In 2010 it was announced that the ITV production centre would be built on Trafford Wharf in the Metropolitan Borough of Trafford.

The site was previously home to Manchester Racecourse via its New Barns site.

== Background ==
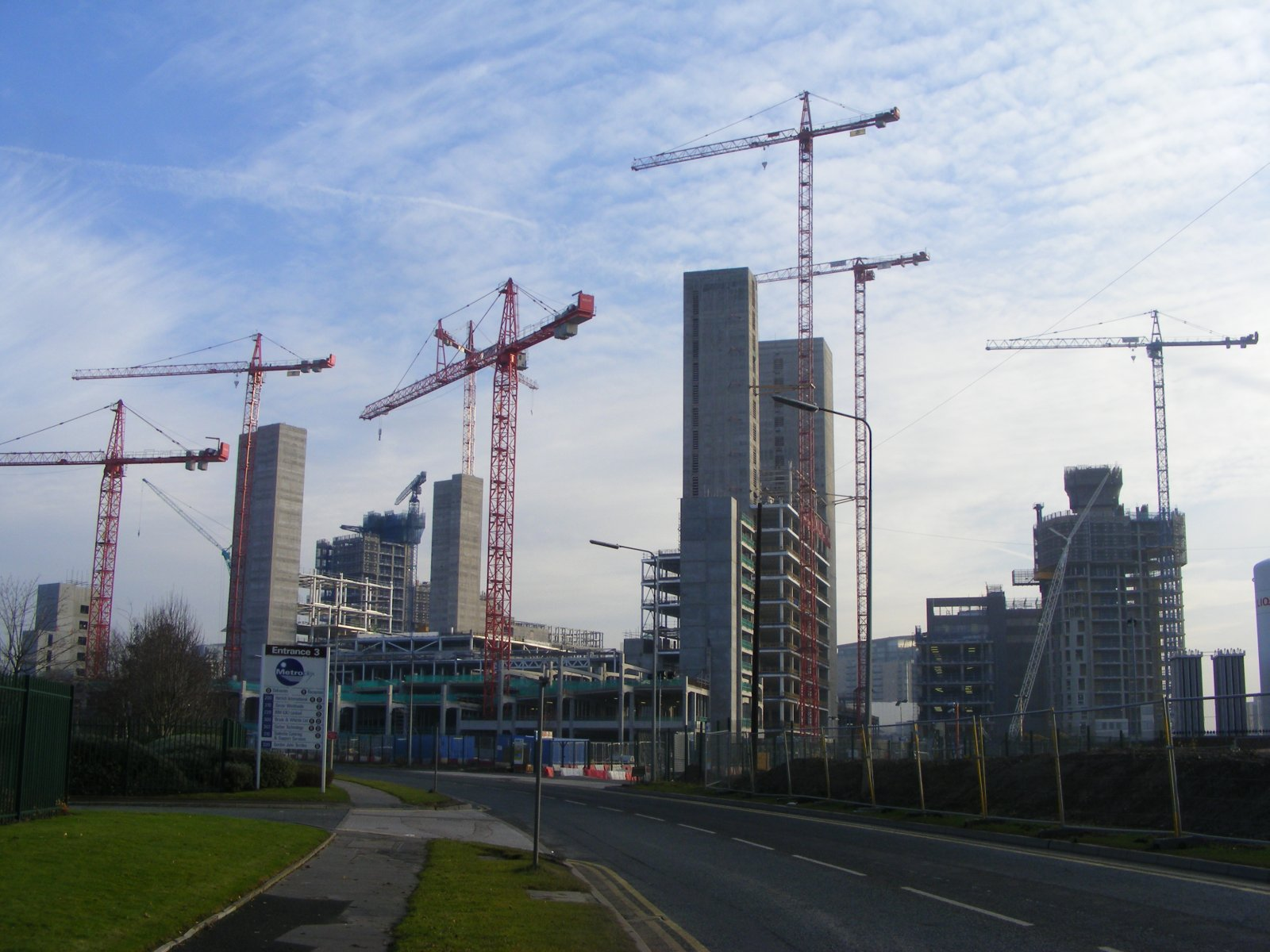
Construction activity, December 2008

In 2003, reports emerged that, as part of the plans for the renewal of its royal charter, the BBC was considering moving whole channels or strands of production from London to Manchester and closing Pebble Mill in Birmingham. Early discussions involved a plan whereby the BBC would move to a new media village proposed by Granada Television at its Bonded Warehouse site at Granada Studios in the city.

Proposals to relocate 1,800 jobs to Manchester were unveiled by Director-General of the BBC, Mark Thompson, in December 2004. The BBC's justification for the move was that its spending per head was low in northern England, where it had low approval ratings, and its facilities at New Broadcasting House in Manchester needed replacing. An initial list of 18 sites was narrowed to a short-list of four during 2005, two in Manchester – one at Quay Street, close to Granada Studios, and one on Whitworth Street and two in Salford – one close to the Manchester Arena and one at Pier 9 on Salford Quays. The site at Salford Quays was chosen in June 2006, and the move north was conditional on a satisfactory licence fee settlement from the government.

The chosen site was the last undeveloped site at Manchester Docks, an area that had been subject to considerable investment and was emerging as a tourist destination, residential and commercial centre. The vision of the developers Peel Group, Salford City Council, the Central Salford Urban Regeneration Company and the Northwest Regional Development Agency was to create a significant new media city capable of competing on a global scale with developments in Copenhagen and Singapore.

Salford City Council granted planning consent for an outline application for a multi-use development on the site involving residential, retail and studio and office space in October 2006 and consent for a detailed planning application followed in May 2007. In the same month, the BBC Trust approved moving five London-based departments to the development. The departments to be moved were Sport, Children's, Learning, Future Media and Technology and Radio Five Live.

Construction started in 2007, with the initial site owner, Peel Group, as developer and Bovis Lend Lease as contractor. The media facilities opened in stages from 2007; the first of them, the Pie Factory, was in a refurbished bakery. It featured three large sound stages suitable for drama productions and commercials.

In January 2011, Peel Media received planning permission to convert on-site offices used by Bovis Lend Lease during the construction of the first phase into the Greenhouse. In November 2024, Lansec acquired the ownership of MediaCityUK from Peel Group.

The first trial show took place in November 2010 in Dock10 Studio HQ2. The half-hour test show featured a power failure and a fire drill, which involved a full evacuation of the audience and crew. The first programme filmed at Dock10 in MediaCityUK was Don't Scare the Hare in February 2011, and the first to transfer was A Question of Sport, the same month. BBC employees started transferring to the development in May 2011, a process that took 36 weeks. Director-General of the BBC Mark Thompson confirmed that up to a further 1,000 jobs could be created or transferred to the site.

In January 2012, the BBC was accused of not supporting the community by the area's local MP, Hazel Blears, after it was reported that only 26 of 680 jobs created at the development had gone to residents of Salford.

== Buildings and facilities ==
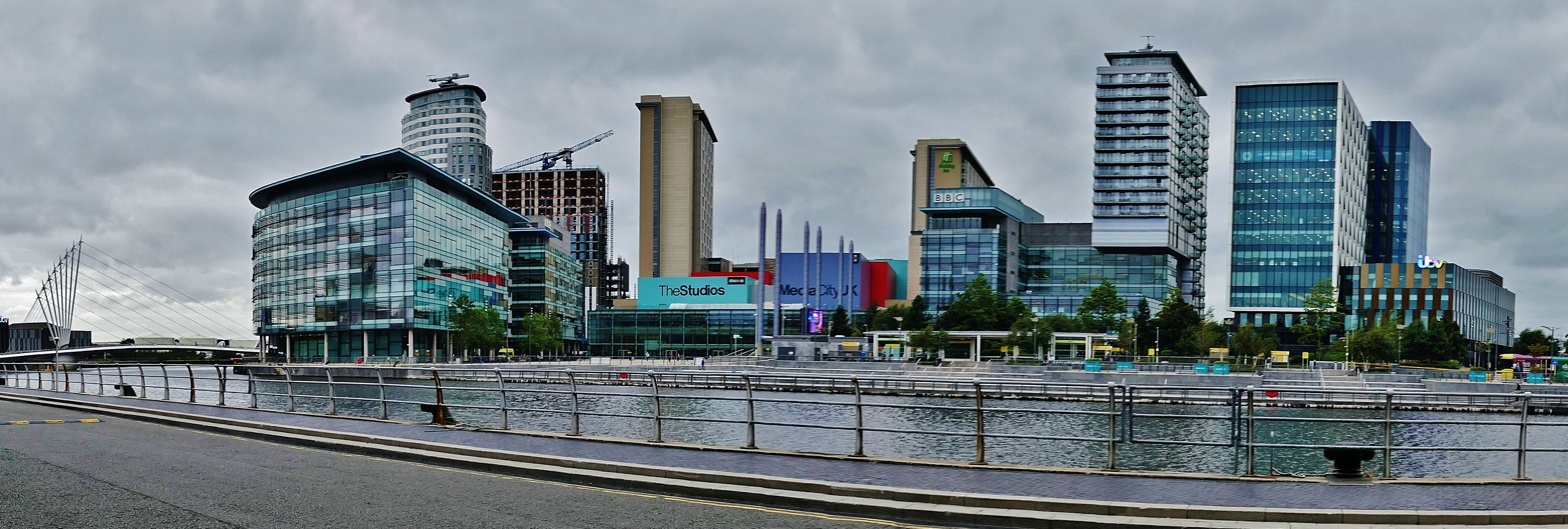
The MediaCityUK complex overlooking the Manchester Ship Canal

Traditional street names are not used in the development; instead, the main thoroughfares are styled blue, white, pink, yellow, orange, purple and green, with street furniture and ambient lighting colour-coded to match. A stylised map of the site has been devised. Landscape architects Gillespies regenerated the brownfield site to create public spaces. The focal point is a piazza and landscaped park, around which the buildings are located. The piazza's two distinct areas, The Green and The Stage, have the capacity to hold events for up to 6,500 people. A free-standing big screen, in front of The Studios, is viewable from the piazza.

The BBC occupies three buildings: Bridge House, Dock House, and Quay House, all designed by architects Wilkinson Eyre, with the interior design by ID:SR Sheppard Robson. The buildings, whose simple forms are intended to harmonise with their waterfront settings, provide 450,000 square feet (42,000 m^{2}) of accommodation and office space, of which the BBC occupies 330,000 square feet (31,000 m^{2}).

Buildings and structures at MediaCityUK
| Image | Description |
|---|---|
| Quay House | Quay House is the BBC's 135,000-square-foot (12,500 m^{2}) main building from where BBC Breakfast, BBC News at One, Newsround, North West regional news programmes, BBC Radio 5 Live and BBC Radio Manchester broadcast. |
| Bridge House | Bridge House was formely the production base for Blue Peter, Mastermind, Dragons' Den, CBBC, and BBC Bitesize. The BBC planned to vacate this building by Spring 2024 and relocate production teams to neighbouring premises. As of September 2026, the building has had the BBC branding removed. |
| Dock House | Dock House contains the BBC's Research & Development and Religion & Ethics departments. In November 2011, BBC Radio 6 Music teams moved from New Broadcasting House into Dock House, where some programmes for BBC Radio 4 are made. |
| Orange Tower | The Orange Tower, designed by architects Sheppard Robson, is an 11-storey glazed structure with four types of cladding, including one made of folded aluminium in a diamond pattern. Three of its floors house departments from the University of Salford, ITV occupies several floors, and other businesses like Kellogg's also have offices there. |
| Dock10 | dock10, stylised as dock10, contains eight television studios, a large orchestral studio and a live performance space and audio studio. Match of the Day is broadcast from here. It was claimed by Peel Media to be the largest such facility in Europe. The main studio has an area of 12,500 square feet (1,160 m^{2}), making it one of the largest in western Europe. Fitting began in 2010 at a cost of £22 million, in time for the BBC's move in summer 2011. The studios vary in size, the larger studios on the ground floor and the smaller on the floor above. The larger of the two audio studios is dedicated to the BBC Philharmonic Orchestra; this studio sits on hydraulic jacks to insulate it from noise generated in the surrounding studios. |
| Pie Factory | The Pie Factory (demolished) occupied the former Freshbake factory, which after closing in 2006, was converted by Peel Media into a TV, film and commercial production facility. The bakery's facilities were renovated into three sound stages, and ancillary and office space. Opened in 2007, this was the first working studio complex at MediaCityUK. The Pie Factory closed in 2020 and was demolished in preparation for Phase 2 of the development. |
| | The Greenhouse, designed by architects Stephenson Bell, is a refurbished three-storey office block that has been converted into small, flexible office suites for small companies in the media and creative industries. The building will be demolished to make way for the site's planned Phase 2 development. |
| high rise | The Heart and Number One are the residential elements of the development, providing 378 apartments in two tower blocks. The Heart is a 22-storey apartment building on the quayside and Number One, another 22-storey building, is next to the studio facilities. |
| high rise | Blue & White Towers are two buildings (visible behind Dock10) ranging up to 16 storeys. The blue tower contains The Landing, while the white tower is home to MediaCityUK's Holiday Inn hotel. |
| | High Definition is a pair of residential towers named Alto and Aria, standing at 17 and 14 storeys respectively, together providing 280 apartments. |
| | === Flexible workspace === MediaCityUK includes flexible workspace and serviced office accommodation marketed by the development under the names Flex and Arrive. In April 2022, Place North West reported that 55,000 sq ft (about 5,110 m^{2}) of conventional office space in the Blue building was converted into serviced workspace to be managed by Arrive. In July 2025, Insider Media reported that MediaCity invested £1 million in its flexible workspace offering, and that 11,308 sq ft (about 1,051 m^{2}) of space had been taken across multiple office towers; the report also described a refurbishment that added 15 office suites ranging from two to 16 desks. Landsec has described Arrive as part of MediaCity's flexible-workspace offer aimed at small and medium-sized enterprises (SMEs). |

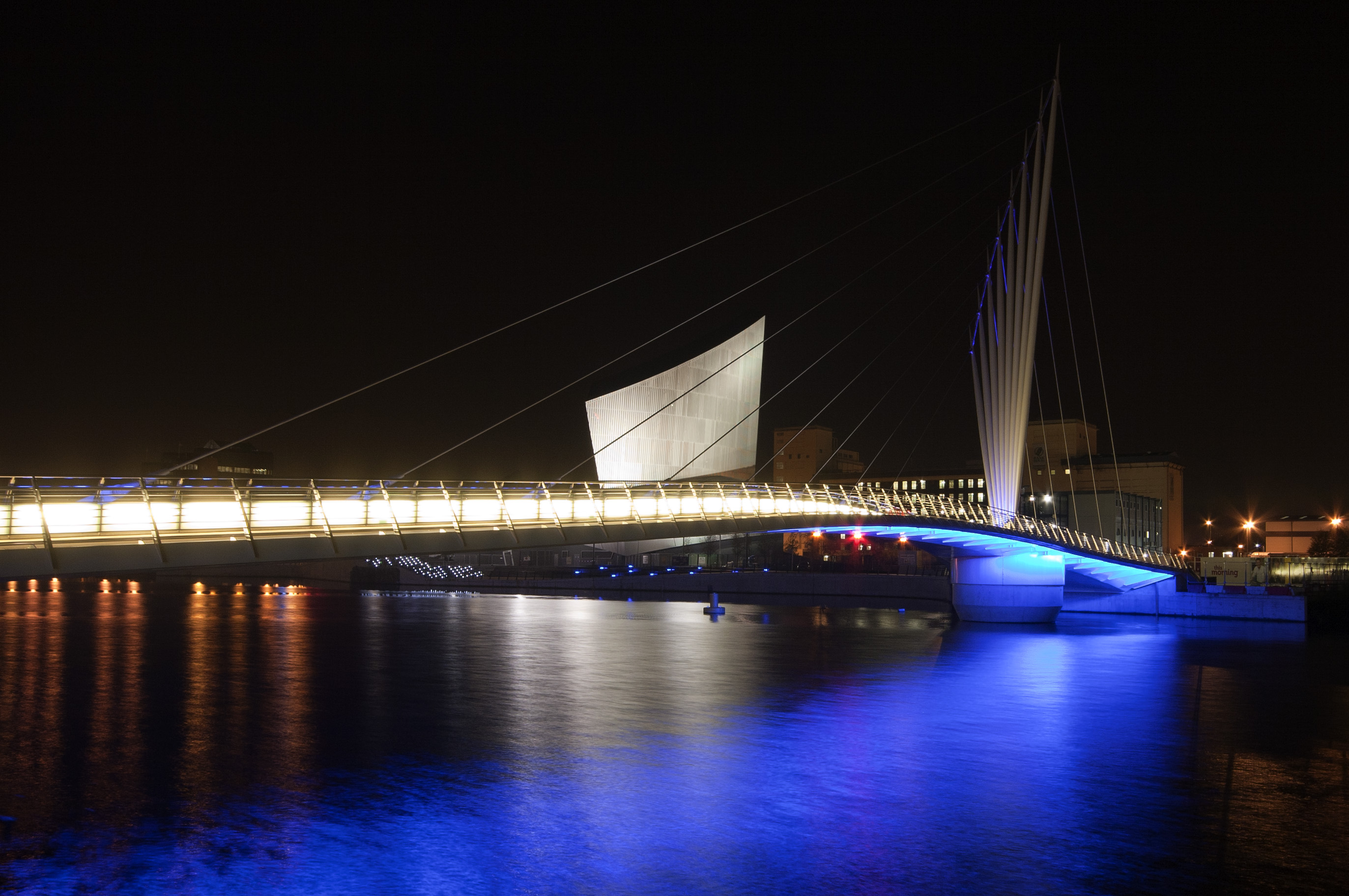
The MediaCityUK footbridge at Salford Quays, illuminated at night. The Imperial War Museum North is clearly visible in the background.

The opening swing footbridge at Salford Quays links MediaCityUK with Trafford Wharf on the southern bank of the ship canal. It was designed by Wilkinson Eyre in association with Gifford. The bridge's main span is 213 feet (65 m) when open and provides a 157-foot (48 m) wide navigation channel accommodating ships' superstructures up to 66 feet (20 m) in height. The developers specified it to be "a unique and memorable landmark". Its visibility is created by a curved bridge deck with an offset pivot mast and array of supporting cables in a fan or sail shape. It has seating benches and is lit at night. The bridge, constructed with funding from the Northwest Regional Development Agency, is the final link in a circular walking route connecting the development with The Lowry and Imperial War Museum North. It was officially opened by Rowan Williams and John Sentamu, the Archbishops of Canterbury and York, and was opened to the public in May 2011 after landscaping works were completed.

The development is powered by a trigeneration energy plant producing electricity for cooling and heating using water from the ship canal. It is more than twice as efficient as conventional grid electricity and helped the development gain BREEAM sustainable community status. The communications network is one of the most advanced in the world, with more than 20 million metres of fibre-optic cable capable of delivering the internet speeds required for media production.

Map of noted buildings and landmarks in MediaCityUK and Trafford Wharf, in Salford Quays

=== Critical reception ===
Architects Sheppard Robson won several awards for their interior design of Quay House for BBC North, including the British Council for Offices Award and the AIT Award. The engineering group Ramboll received recognition for its design of the Salford Quays footbridge, which was praised as "a graceful and well engineered bridge [...] a delightful testament to the art of structural engineering". The bridge designers won the British Constructional Steelwork Association's 2012 Structural Steel Design Award and a North West Civil Engineering Award from the Institution of Civil Engineers.

The architecture at MediaCity was received unfavourably by Building Design magazine, which awarded the development with the 2011 Carbuncle Cup for Worst New Building. Owen Hatherley writing in The Guardian also criticised the development, describing it as "an enclave, easily closed off from the life of the rest of the city". These critiques highlighted concerns about the design's disconnect from its urban surroundings and its impact on the local community.

== Tenants ==
=== BBC ===
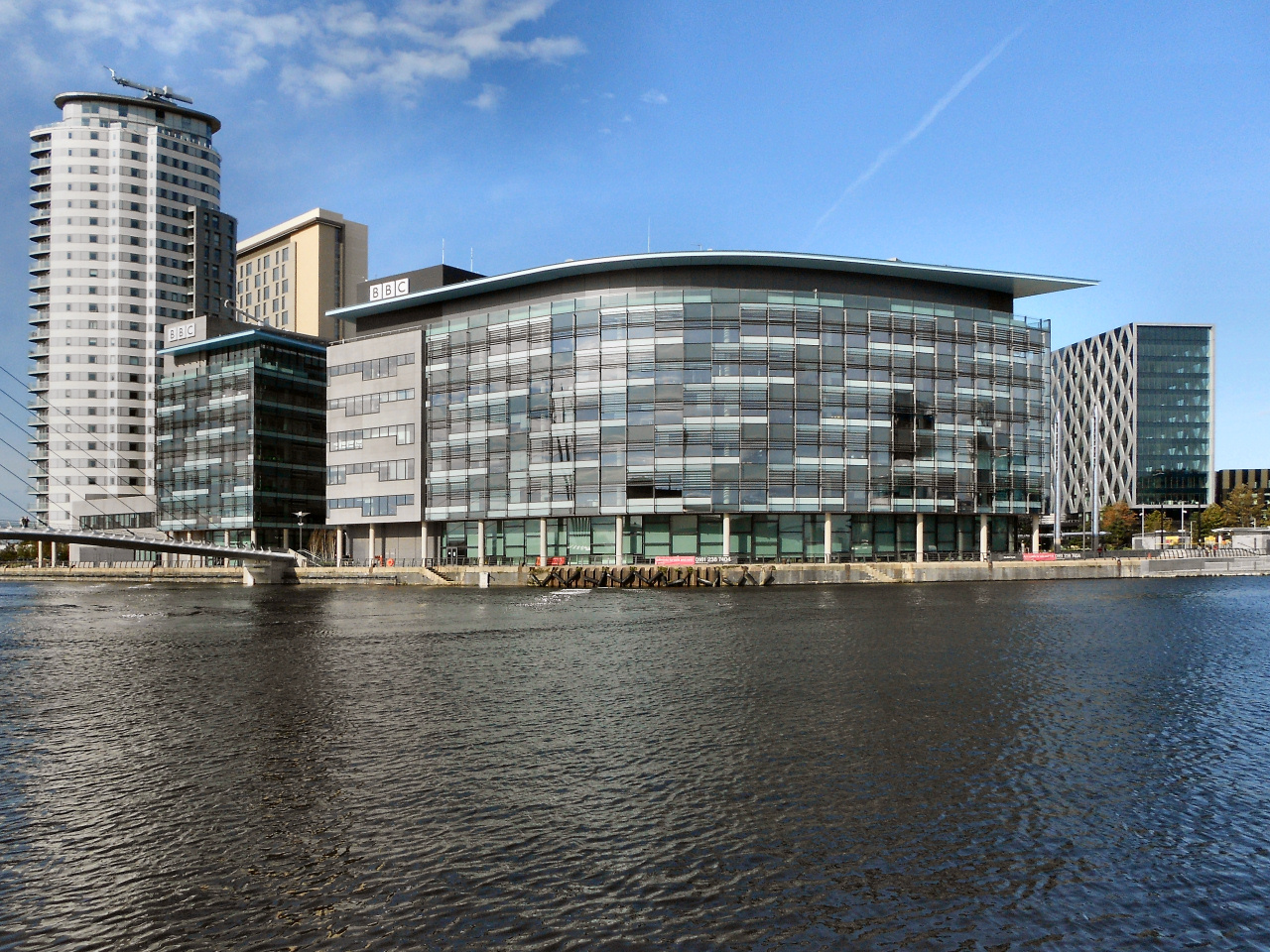
BBC branding is visible on the exteriors of Bridge House (left) and Quay House (right).

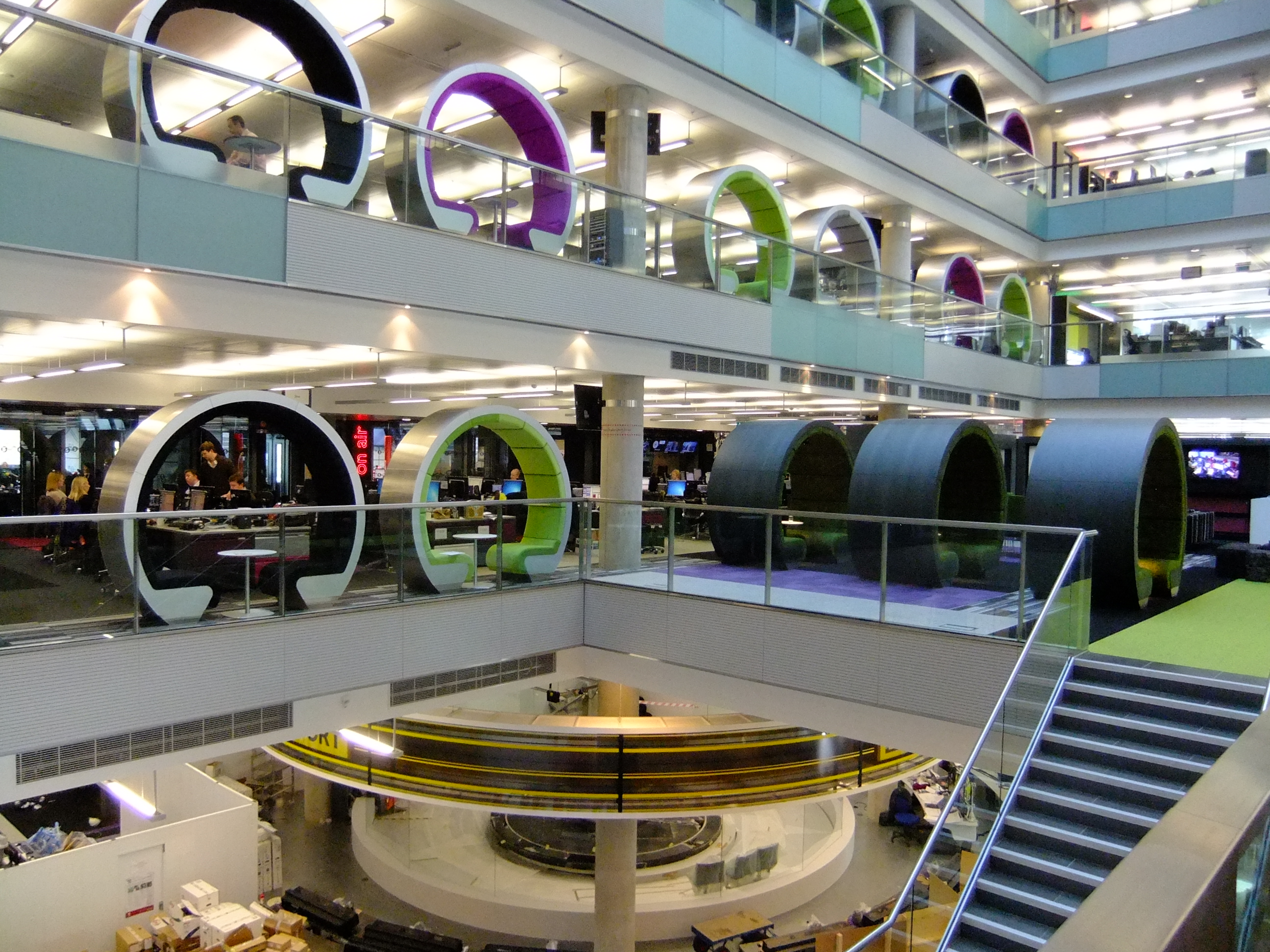
The interior of Quay House, with the production areas for BBC Radio 5 Live and BBC Sport

As of 2023, approximately 2,700 BBC staff are employed at MediaCityUK. The BBC currently occupies three buildings at MediaCityUK: Bridge House, Dock House and Quay House.

The BBC North operation at MediaCityUK was brought about by relocating a significant number of staff from BBC premises in London. On 31 May 2007, the BBC Trust gave final approval for the creation of "a major new BBC centre in the North", to be completed by 2011. It was claimed that the development would create up to 10,000 jobs and add £1 billion to the regional economy over five years. It was announced in July 2010 that the BBC Breakfast programme would move to Salford Quays. In 2009, the BBC had estimated that moving to Salford would cost almost £1 billion, spread over twenty years, but in May 2011, Director-General Mark Thompson claimed that the cost of moving was much less than that originally planned.

In 2017, the Centre for Cities published a report showing the impact of the move in the five years between 2011 and 2016. It found there were 4,600 new jobs in MediaCityUK, however 2,000 of those were BBC staff relocated from elsewhere in the country, while 1,200 were from existing Greater Manchester businesses relocating (including 640 BBC staff already based in the city) for 1,400 net new jobs created at MediaCityUK by the move; there was little relocation of other businesses from elsewhere in the country, with only 145 in existing businesses moving to Greater Manchester. The number employed in media within one mile of MediaCityUK was static over the five years, as cuts in output offset new job growth (and the coverage of the 2012 London Olympics was a peak for BBC Sport). However, the economic impact outside Salford was greater, with the creation of 4,420 new jobs for existing businesses in the wider city region.

Various divisions of the BBC have bases at the MediaCityUK campus, generally referred to as BBC North. Output includes network programming (BBC Breakfast, BBC News at One); BBC North West regional news; BBC children's TV (CBBC and CBeebies); BBC Three; Radio Manchester, BBC Radio 3, BBC Radio 4, BBC Radio 5 Live and 5 Sports Extra, BBC Radio 6 Music, BBC Radio 1, BBC Religion & Ethics, BBC Sport, BBC Learning and the BBC Philharmonic. The campus is also home to a 24/7 engineering team overseeing online and broadcast output, plus teams for other key products and services including: BBC iPlayer, BBC Sounds, BBC Research & Development, Children in Need and Comic Relief. Some staff in the commercial division, BBC Studios, also work from MediaCityUK.

In November 2022, the BBC announced plans to vacate Bridge House as part of a scheme to reduce costs. Staff from BBC Children's, BBC Education, BBC Sport and operations staff will relocate to other MediaCity premises, Quay House and Dock House, by the spring of 2024.

=== ITV ===
Coronation Street production base, exterior sets and studios at ITV Studios, used since 2013

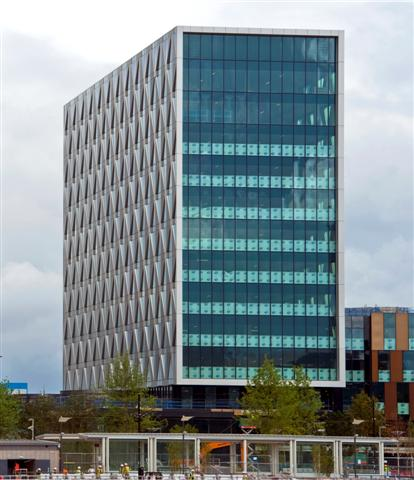
The Orange building houses the University of Salford campus and ITV Granada.

ITV's Granada region was interested in relocating but negotiations with the developers, Peel Media, were abandoned in 2009 amid a financial dispute. After a change of management at ITV Granada, talks resumed in January 2010 and in December the decision to move to MediaCityUK was announced. A production facility was constructed on Trafford Wharf to house the Coronation Street sets that transferred from Granada Studios in 2013. In March 2013, Granada Reports was broadcast from MediaCityUK signifying the completion of the initial phase of its migration from the Granada Studios in Quay Street. The MediaCityUK site is home to approximately 750 ITV employees at ITV Granada and ITV Studios.

=== NEP Connect / SIS LIVE ===
Satellite Information Services (SIS), later known as SIS LIVE, has occupied an office at The Pie Factory since 2006 and in 2010 formed a joint venture with Peel to manage the studios. In 2011 SIS announced it would move its headquarters from London and awarded a £3 million contract to S3 Satcom and SATCOM Technologies for the provision of a nine earth station broadcast teleport on Trafford Wharf. SIS announced the launch of its teleport in July 2012 and opened offices in the Blue Tower a month later.

In October 2018, SIS LIVE was taken over by NEP Group, who rebranded the firm to 'NEP Connect' and have continued to operate their facilities at MediaCityUK.

=== University of Salford ===
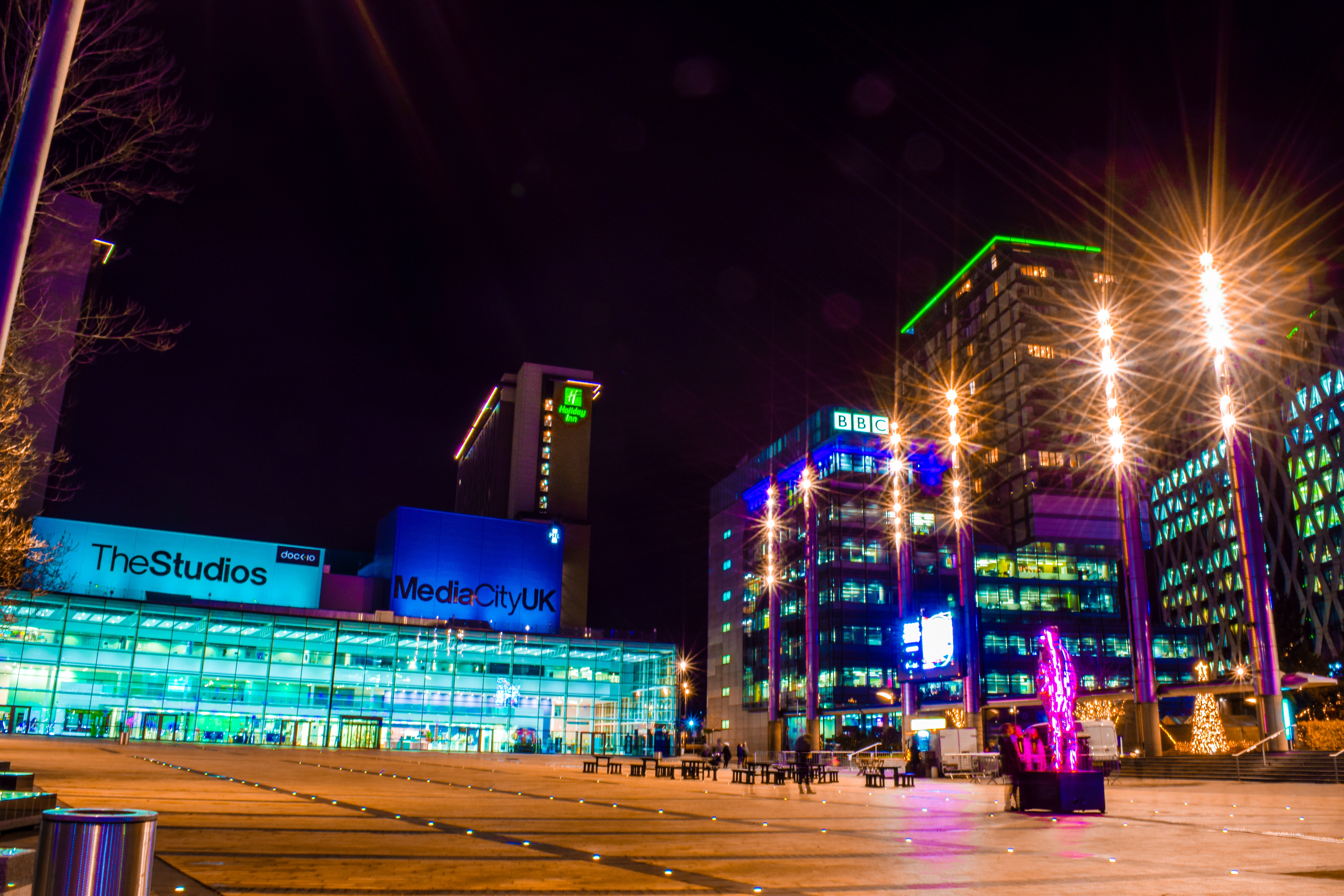
The MediaCityUK plaza seen at night during the 2018 Lightwaves Festival looking towards Dock10, the BBC and Salford University

The University of Salford moved its media-related teaching and research to the MediaCityUK site in October 2011. The move will controversially cost the university more than £2.25 million in rent per annum until 2020.

=== dock10 ===
dock10 is a television facility owner and media services company, located within MediaCityUK, Salford. dock10 offers a number of services, but its two most notable is Television Studios and post production.

=== Red Bee Media ===
Red Bee has offices, playout and managed media facilities at their MediaCityUK location.

=== Others ===
A diverse mix of about 40 service companies, along with small companies offering ancillary services such as casting and camera hire, occupy The Pie Factory and The Greenhouse. Antix Productions moved into offices in The Greenhouse in 2011. In 2012 the Rugby Football League opened an office in The Greenhouse to facilitate the administration of the 2013 Rugby League World Cup.

In 2008, Hope High School in Salford was taken over by Oasis Community Learning, an evangelical Christian organisation, and renamed Oasis Academy MediaCityUK; its new premises in Salford Quays, on the edge of the MediaCity UK site, were completed in September 2012. UTC@MediaCityUK, a University Technical College backed by the University of Salford, The Lowry and the Aldridge Foundation, specialising in the creative, media and music industries opened in 2015.

== Transport ==
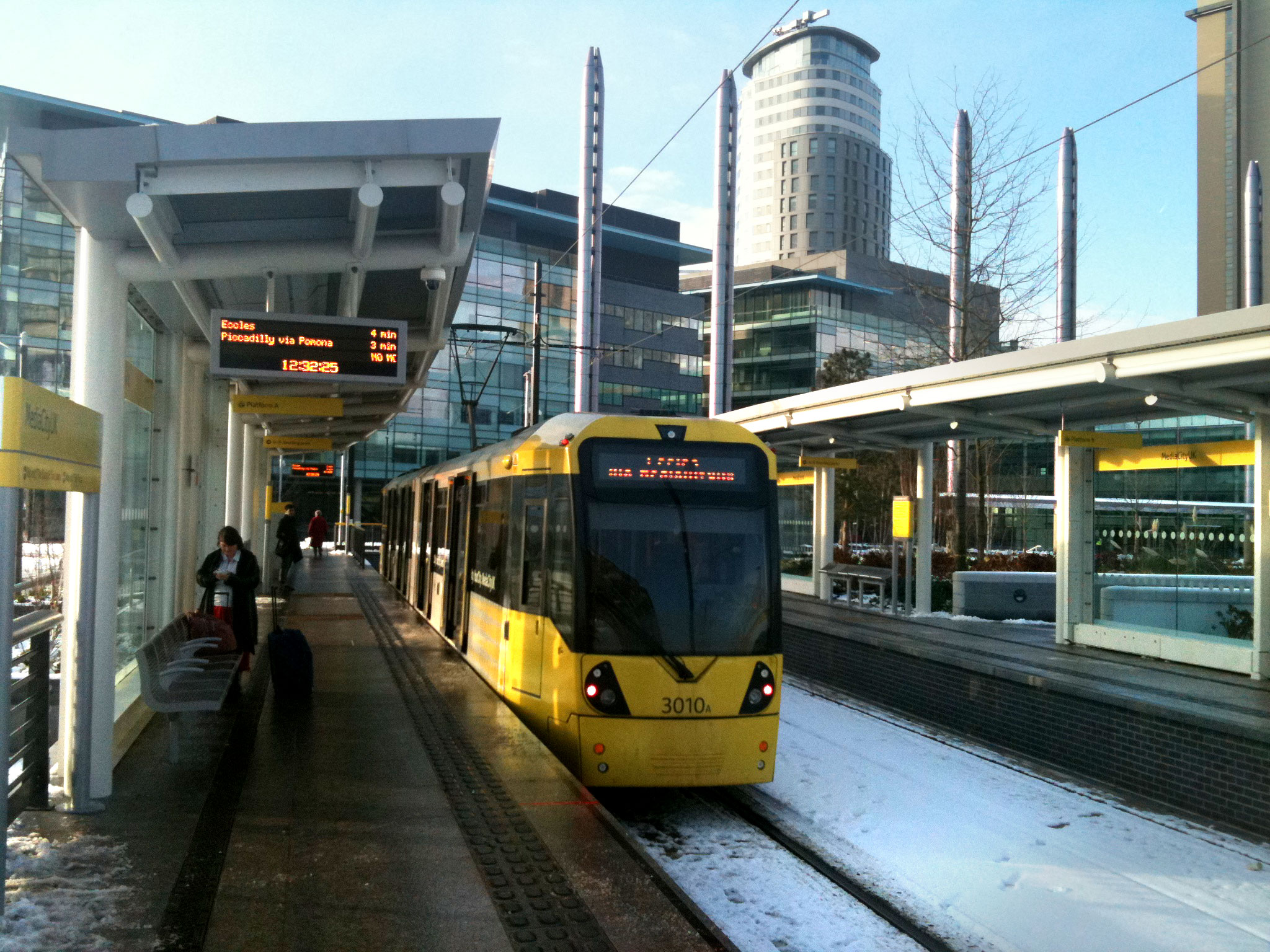
MediaCityUK tram stop

The MediaCityUK tram stop opened on 20 September 2010, part of the Metrolink light-rail system serving Greater Manchester. It lies at the end of a 360-metre (0.22 mi) spur from the Eccles Line, which was built as part of Phase 3 of the Metrolink expansion project. Trams run to Eccles and Ashton-under-Lyne via Etihad Campus and Piccadilly. Across the Media City Footbridge, the "Trafford Park Line" Metrolink extension, completed in March 2020, has a stop at the adjacent Imperial War Museum.

Vehicular access to the Quays has been improved by the construction of Broadway Link Road, which links the site to the M602 motorway at junction 2, and by the provision of car parking. The high-rise 2116 space multi-storey car park was completed in August 2009. It is a pre-cast curved structure clad in a mixture of aluminium mesh panels and shaded aluminium tiles, comprising 11 floors of parking above the development's energy centre and commercial units.

Frequent bus services are provided from the site by Go North West's Orbits 53 providing links to Oxford Road, Etihad Campus and Cheetham Hill and Stagecoach Manchester's 50 linking MediaCityUK to East Didsbury, Manchester Piccadilly bus station, Salford Central and Salford Crescent railway stations, the University of Salford and Salford Shopping Centre. A number of lower frequency routes are operated by Diamond Bus North West linking Boothstown, Worsley and Stretford with the site.

Footpaths and cycleways to Manchester city centre and 300 cycle racks encourage healthy and green ways of accessing the site.

== Studios ==
There are several large TV and radio studio complexes in MediaCityUK, including:

- BBC (Quay House and Dock House)
- Dock10 (CBBC, CBeebies, BBC Sport and commercial productions for Channel 4, ITV and others)
- University of Salford's MediaCityUK campus

== Shops and restaurants ==
There are numerous shops and restaurants in MediaCityUK, including:

- Co-op
- Costa Coffee
- Greggs
- Pret a Manger
- Wagamama

and others.

In 2020 the nearby Lowry Outlet Mall rebranded itself as "Quayside MediaCityUK".

== Entertainment ==
There are outdoor markets in the piazza outside Lowry on the last weekend of every month. MediaCityUK hosts the We Invented the Weekend festival in summer and the Lightwaves festival in winter.

== See also ==
- Media in Manchester
