= Rod Aldridge =

British businessman (born 1947)

Rod Aldridge OBE FRSA
- Born: 7 November 1947 (age 78)
- Other name: Sir Rodney Malcolm Aldridge
- Occupations: Chairman, Aldridge Foundation
- Spouse: Carol Aldridge

Sir Rodney Malcolm Aldridge (born 7 November 1947) is the founder and former executive chairman of Capita, a British company specialising in business process outsourcing.

He formerly chaired Vinspired, a charity launched in May 2006 aiming to help young people volunteer in their local communities. Aldridge is a donor and former trustee of the Prince's Trust and is chairman of the Aldridge Foundation, an educational charity which sponsors academy schools in England and promotes entrepreneurial education.

According to The Sunday Times Rich List in 2019, Aldridge is worth £135 million.

== Professional activities ==
Aldridge founded and led the Capita Group from its formation in 1984 until 2006. During this time the group expanded to become a FTSE 100 company. The group was founded in 1987 when Aldridge led the management buyout (MBO) of the group from the Chartered Institute of Public Finance and Accountancy (CIPFA).

In 2006 Aldridge resigned as Executive Chairman of Capita after it was revealed that he had lent the Labour Party £1 million. The loan, which was secret at the time it was made, was controversial, in part, because Capita is a major public sector supplier. Aldridge retired from his position as Chairman of Capita in July 2006.

Prior to Capita, Aldridge worked in local government for 10 years with East Sussex County Council, Brighton Borough Council, Crawley Borough Council and West Sussex County Council. He joined CIPFA in 1974, becoming its Technical Director. At the launch announcement of Ada, the National College for Digital Skills, he was also listed as Chair.

Aldridge is a former Chair of Vinspired, a charity launched in May 2006 aiming to help young people volunteer in their local communities. He is a patron and former trustee of The Prince's Trust and was the Chairman of the Confederation of British Industry's (CBI) public services strategy board at its inception in 2003 through to July 2006. He is a former Non-Executive Director on the Ministerial Advisory Board of the Foreign and Commonwealth Office (FCO) Services, an Executive Agency of the FCO. In 2009, he took up a role as Chair of the Department of Health (United Kingdom) 'Dance Champions Group', aiming to encourage more adults to take up dance as a form of physical activity.

In January 2007 he was appointed Chairman of The Lowry, a theatre and arts venue in Salford. He is also a member of the Prince's Charities Council, a patron of the Prince's Trust, Non-executive Director of Equiniti, a Director of Cornerstone and a Director of Constellation Healthcare Technologies.

== Recognition ==
In the 2012 New Year Honours Aldridge received a knighthood for his services to young people. He was made an Officer of the Order of the British Empire (OBE) in the 1994 New Year Honours, for services to the computer industry.

He was given the Freedom of the City of London in 1996. He is on the Court of the Worshipful Company of Information Technologists.

Aldridge is a fellow of the Royal Society of Arts and is a Founder Freeman of the Guild of Entrepreneurs.

In 2016, Aldridge donated £1.8 million to Sussex County Cricket Club for the completion of the Sir Rod Aldridge Cricket Centre at Brighton Aldridge Community Academy.

He also sponsored the Darwen Moorland high school located in Lancashire.
