= Vinspired =

British charity organization

vinspired
- Formation: 2006
- Dissolved: 26 November 2018; 7 years ago
- Registration no.: "Vinspired, registered charity no. 1113255". Charity Commission for England and Wales.
- Website: vinspired.com
- Formerly called: v, until 2011

Vinspired (stylized: vInspired) was an independent British charity that helped young people volunteer in their local communities. Its projects aimed to engage under-represented groups in volunteering such as minority groups and those not in education, employment, or training (NEET).

== History ==
Established in May 2004 by the then Home Secretary, David Blunkett, and the Chancellor of the Exchequer, Gordon Brown, The Russell Commission set out to develop a new national framework for youth action and engagement.

Headed by Ian Russell, the CEO of Scottish Power, the Commission aimed to deliver a step change in the diversity, quality and quantity of volunteering opportunities available to young people aged 16 to 25 in the UK. With help from its youth advisory board, the YABsters, the Commission engaged a wide range of stakeholders, including young people, the voluntary sector, business and the media, receiving over 700 responses from voluntary and community sector organisations, and a further 6,000 responses from young people.

The Commission’s headline recommendation was the creation of a dedicated implementation body to take the lead in delivering the new framework in England. This was launched as v in May 2006 and changed its name to vinspired in January 2011.

It was announced in November 2018 that vinspired was to close with the loss of 20 jobs.

== Projects ==
vinspired worked with over 500 voluntary sector organisations and over 150 private sector partners to create innovative youth volunteering opportunities.

The organisation also ran the following grants programmes:

- the match fund
- vinvolved
- vTalent

== The vinvolved Team Network ==
Launched in April 2008, vinvolved, the national youth volunteering programme, aimed to get half a million more young people positively involved in their communities.

vinspired's England-wide network of 107 vinvolved teams ensured that young people and voluntary organisations could access expert advice and help.

As of March 2011, all vinvolved teams came to an end due to cut in government funding.
