= The Excelsior Academy =

School in Hackney, North London

Location
- Shacklewell Lane; London, Greater London, E8 2EY; England; 51°33′09″N 0°04′12″W

Information
- Type: Academy
- Motto: Inspiring and supporting every child
- Religious affiliation: Non-denominational
- Established: 2006
- Founder: Sir Jack Petchey CBE, David Daniels
- Local authority: Hackney
- Specialist: Health, Care, Medical Sciences & STEM
- Department for Education URN: 131062 Tables
- Ofsted: Reports
- Chair: Dorothy Dalton
- Principal: Omar Deria
- Gender: Mixed
- Age: 11 to 18 (16-18)
- Colours: Petchey blue and black
- Website: https://www.excelsiorcst.org/

The Excelsior Academy, formerly Petchey Academy, is an academy in the Shacklewell area, on the site of the former Kingsland School in the London Borough of Hackney, where its LEA is The Learning Trust. The Academy is a comprehensive high school and sixth form for boys and girls aged from 11 to 18.

The academy is non-denominational and offers five subject categories. These are: Core (English, mathematics and science), Human Spirit (History, Sociology, Religious Studies) Wider World (Geography and Foreign Languages), Society and The Arts (Music, Drama, Art), and Enterprise and Innovation (Food Technology, Business, DT, PE, Computing).

== History ==
Established in 2006, The Petchey Academy was created with the aim of addressing poor education standards in Inner London. The school was originally named after businessman, philanthropist, and former football club director and owner Jack Petchey who sponsored the academy.

== Academic performance and inspection ==
As of 2025, the school's most recent inspection by Ofsted was in 2024, with an outcome of Good.
