= Haringey Sixth Form College =

Location
- White Hart Lane; Tottenham; London, N17 8HR; United Kingdom; 51.60649°N 0.0738°W

Information
- Type: Academy sixth form
- Motto: Success. Ambition. Resilience. Previously Aiming for Excellence
- Religious affiliation: Non-denominational
- Established: 2007
- Local authority: Haringey
- Department for Education URN: 139363 Tables
- Ofsted: Reports
- Chairman of the Board of Trustees: Mr David Wyatt
- Principal: Ms Lisa Westray
- Gender: Mixed sex
- Age: 16 to 19
- Website: http://www.haringey6.ac.uk/

Haringey Sixth Form College (previously Haringey Sixth Form Centre) is a mixed-sex sixth form college located in the Tottenham area of the London Borough of Haringey, United Kingdom.

The college offers a range of vocational programmes of study including BTECs, and a small number of A-level courses, for students aged 16–19.

As of 2023, the college has a 'Requires improvement' rating from the statutory inspectorate, Ofsted. However they have since noted, as of 2024, that the college has made reasonable progress in all areas.

== History ==
St Katharine's College - College of All Saints - Middlesex Polytechnic

The original site on which Haringey Sixth Form College today stands was originally home to St Katharine's College, one of the first British teacher training colleges. The St Katharine's College building was constructed in 1878 under the watch of architect Sir Arthur W. Blomfield.

St Katharine's College later became the College of All Saints, a Church of England college of higher education and a constituent college of the Institute of Education, University of London. All Saints awarded University of London degrees. The name change was prompted by the 1964 merger of St Katharine's College with Berridge House, Hampstead, and to reflect the Christian ethos of All Saints.

The College of All Saints expanded in the 1960s, both in terms of student numbers and estate size, although much of the campus retained its Victorian architecture, including its Anglican chapel, used for corporate worship. The college was highly regarded whilst a constituent of the University of London's Institute of Education, but after its formal closing in 1978 and the incorporation of the campus into Middlesex Polytechnic its reputation suffered.

The 'All Saints site' (later relaunched as the 'Tottenham campus') was home to humanities and cultural studies, business studies, law, sociology, and women's studies, all of which have since been moved to other campuses. The buildings, previously occupied by St Katharine's College, then the College of All Saints, and lastly Middlesex Polytechnic, were all demolished, meaning the loss of the historic Victorian architecture including the chapel.

All Saints Educational Trust

The College of All Saints Foundation, dating from the 1964 merger of St Katharine's College and Berridge House, continues as the All Saint's Educational Trust.

Haringey Sixth Form College

The site on which the historic buildings once stood is today home to Haringey Sixth Form College. The college, originally established in 2007 as Haringey Sixth Form Centre, resides in a modern building constructed by Middlesex University for their contemporary Tottenham campus, shortly before they abandoned the site.

Haringey Sixth Form Centre was opened by Haringey Council to replace the sixth forms of secondary schools in east of the borough, which the council had decided to close owing to poor Ofsted ratings and exam results. Secondary schools in the west of the borough were allowed to keep their sixth forms. However, the centre converted to academy status in 2013, and is now free to offer places to students from all over London.

In 2015, the founding Principal, Mrs June Jarrett retired. The current Principal, is Ms. Lisa Westray

== Performance and data ==
Student numbers and courses

As of the 2019/20 academic year, the college had 1,041 students on roll, with the vast majority studying vocational programmes from entry level through to level 3 in areas such as health and social care, media, business, and applied science. Only a few students take academic programmes, with a small cohort of 159 students on A-level courses.

Exam results and university progression

From its opening in 2007, the College struggled to secure good A-level and vocational results for its students. However, in 2017 the College achieved its highest set of A-level results, with a 4% increase in the number of students achieving higher grades, and two students securing places at Russell Group universities.

Ofsted inspections and ratings

At its first Ofsted statutory inspection in 2008, the centre was judged to be 'Good'. However, by its next full inspection in 2012, it was found to be 'Satisfactory' with a decline in standards.

The Centre legally closed in 2013 and Haringey Sixth Form College legally opened in its place as a result of the conversion to academy status. At its first full inspection in 2014, the college was rated 'Requires improvement', the lowest of the four Ofsted ratings (1 Outstanding, 2 Good, 3 Satisfactory, 4 Requires improvement). By its next full inspection in 2015, it had improved considerably and achieved a 'Good' rating. However, as of 2020 and the college's third full inspection, a rating of 'Requires improvement' was once again given.

== Curriculum ==
Haringey Sixth Form College offers a range of A-levels and BTECs as programmes of study for students.

The college also operates dedicated academies for basketball (in partnership with the London Lions) and futsal (in partnership with Tottenham Hotspur F.C.).

The majority of programmes at the college are for students aged 16–19; however, the college provides an EAL (English as an additional language) provision for students aged 14–16 who have been excluded from secondary school.
