= 2022 deaths in the United Kingdom =

The following notable deaths in the United Kingdom occurred in 2022. Names are reported under the date of death, in alphabetical order as set out in WP:NAMESORT. A typical entry reports information in the following sequence: Name, age, country of citizenship at birth and subsequent nationality (if applicable), what subject was noted for, year of birth (if known), and reference.

== January ==
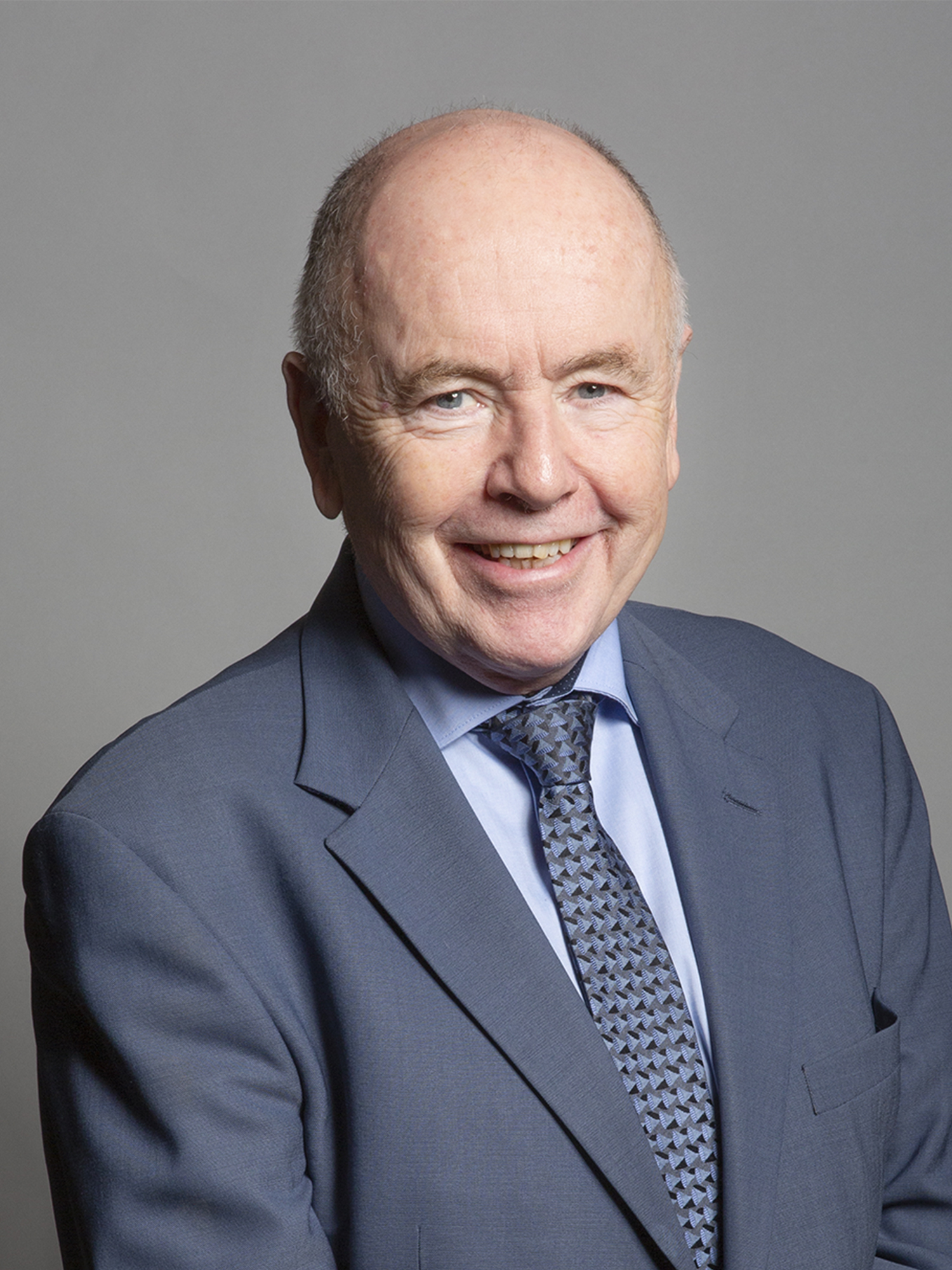
Jack Dromey in 2019

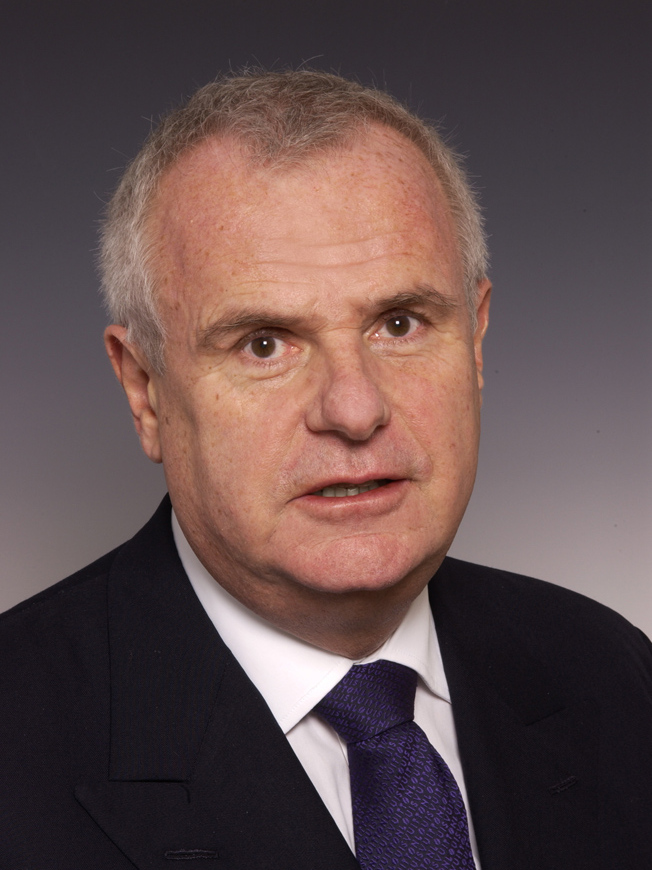
Paul Myners, Baron Myners in 2006

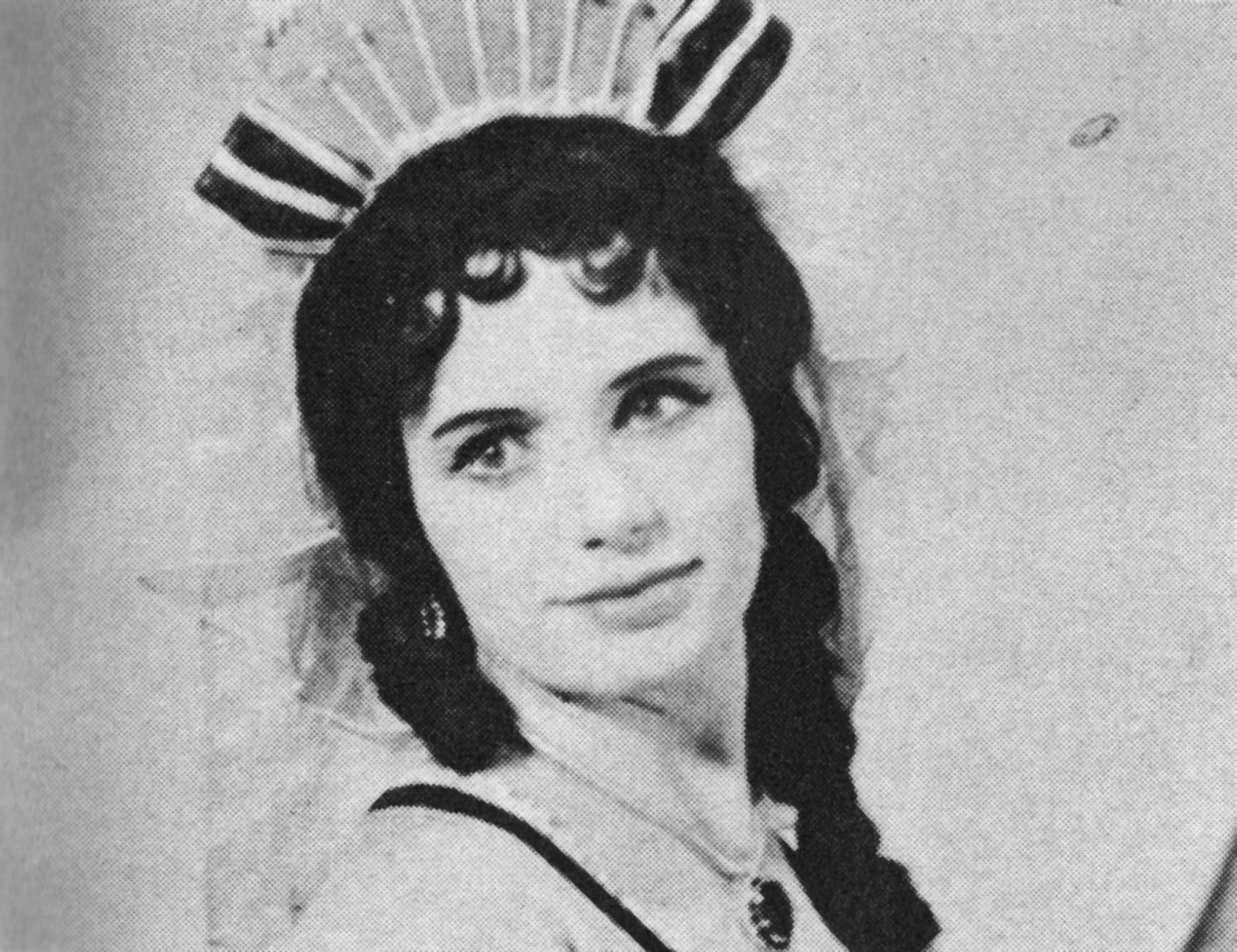
Jennifer Toye in 1962

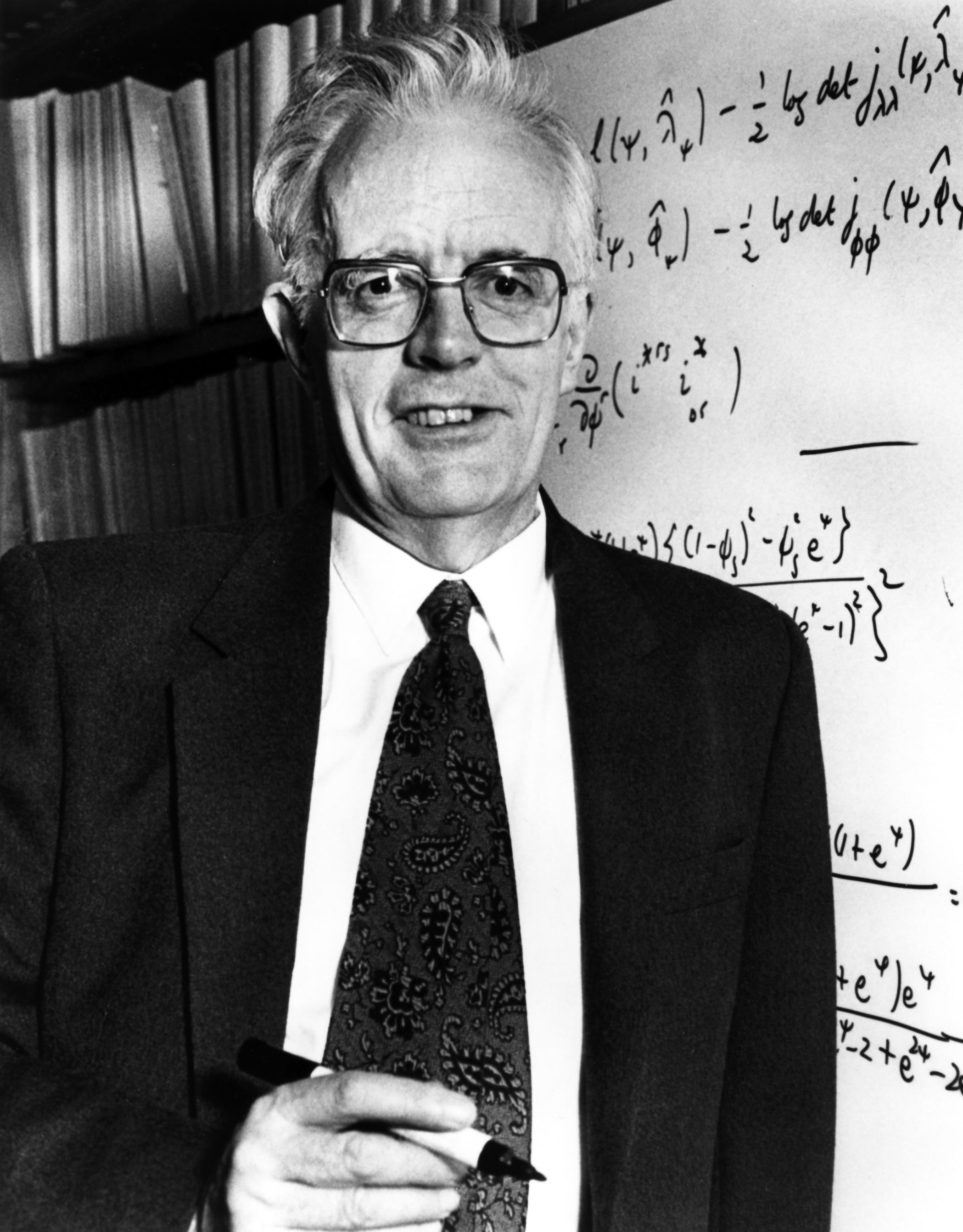
David Cox in 1980

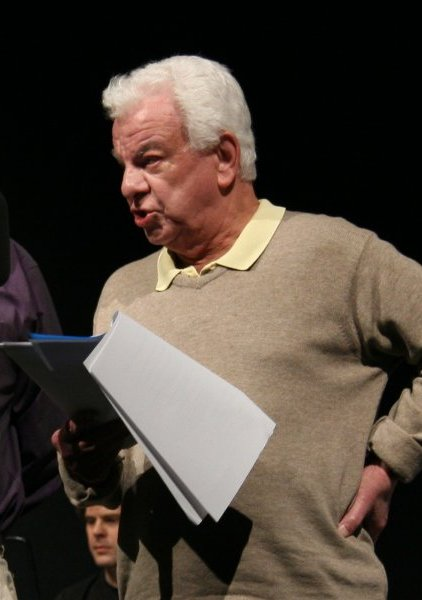
Barry Cryer in 2006

- 1 January – Gary Burgess, broadcaster and journalist (b. 1975).
- 5 January – George Rossi, Scottish actor (The Bill, Roughnecks, The Singing Detective) (b. 1961).
- 7 January
  - Jack Dromey, Labour MP for Birmingham Erdington (since 2010) and Shadow Minister, husband of Harriet Harman (b. 1948).
  - Bobby Harrison, rock drummer and singer (Procol Harum, Freedom, Snafu) (b. 1939).
  - Robert Hughes, Baron Hughes of Woodside, politician, MP (1970–1997) and chair of the Anti-Apartheid Movement (1976–1995) (b. 1932).
  - Jimmy Smith, English professional footballer (Chelsea, Leyton Orient) (b. 1930).
- 8 January – Keith Todd, Welsh professional footballer (Swansea Town) (b. 1941).
- 9 January
  - Fiona Denison, Scottish academic, COVID-19 (b. 1970).
  - Nicholas Donnelly, actor (Grange Hill, Dixon of Dock Green, Lifeforce) (b. 1938).
- 10 January
  - Glyn Jones, English professional footballer (Sheffield United, Rotherham United, Mansfield Town) (b. 1936).
  - Colin Slater, English sports commentator (BBC Radio Nottingham) (b. 1934).
  - Gary Waldhorn, English actor and comedian (The Vicar of Dibley, Brush Strokes, All at No 20) (b. 1943).
- 11 January – Jana Bennett, American-born British media consultant (BBC) (b. 1955).
- 12 January – Claire Tomlinson, polo player and polo pony breeder who coached the England national team she once captained (b. 1944).
- 14 January
  - Lol Morgan, English professional footballer (Huddersfield Town, Rotherham United, Darlington) and manager (Darlington, Norwich City) (b. 1931).
  - Sean Rice, Canadian pair skater (Dancing on Ice) (b. 1972).
  - John Sainsbury, Baron Sainsbury of Preston Candover, businessman, chief executive of Sainsbury's (1969–1992) (b. 1927).
- 15 January – Paul Hinshelwood, English footballer (Crystal Palace, Oxford United, Millwall, Colchester United) (b. 1956).
- 16 January – Paul Myners, Baron Myners, politician, member of the House of Lords (since 2008) (b. 1948).
- 17 January
  - Jackie Fisher, English footballer (Millwall, Bournemouth) (b. 1925).
  - Jennifer Toye, opera singer (b. 1933).
- 18 January
  - Sir David Cox, statistician (Cox process, Point Processes) (b. 1924).
  - Jamie Vincent, English footballer (Bournemouth, Portsmouth, Swindon Town), heart attack (b. 1975).
- 19 January – Nigel Rogers, operatic tenor (b. 1935).
- 20 January – David Bramwell, botanist (b. 1942).
- 21 January – Howard Radford, Welsh professional footballer (Bristol Rovers)
- 24 January – Ronnie Fearn, Baron Fearn, politician, MP (1987–1992, 1997–2001), member of the House of Lords (2001–2018) (b. 1931).
- 25 January
  - Barry Cryer, English comedian (I'm Sorry I Haven't a Clue) and screenwriter (Doctor in the House) (b. 1935).
  - Wim Jansen, Dutch professional football player and manager (Celtic) (b. 1946).
  - Sir Crispin Tickell, environmentalist and diplomat, permanent representative to the United Nations (1987–1990), pneumonia (b. 1930).
- 28 January – Sir Erik Bennett, RAF air vice marshal (b. 1928).
- 29 January
  - Leonard Fenton, English actor (EastEnders) (b. 1926).
  - Jo Kendall, British actress (Emmerdale) and writer (b. 1940).
- 30 January
  - Geoffrey Ashe, cultural historian and lecturer (b. 1923).
  - Norma Waterson, English singer and songwriter (The Watersons) (b. 1939).

== February ==
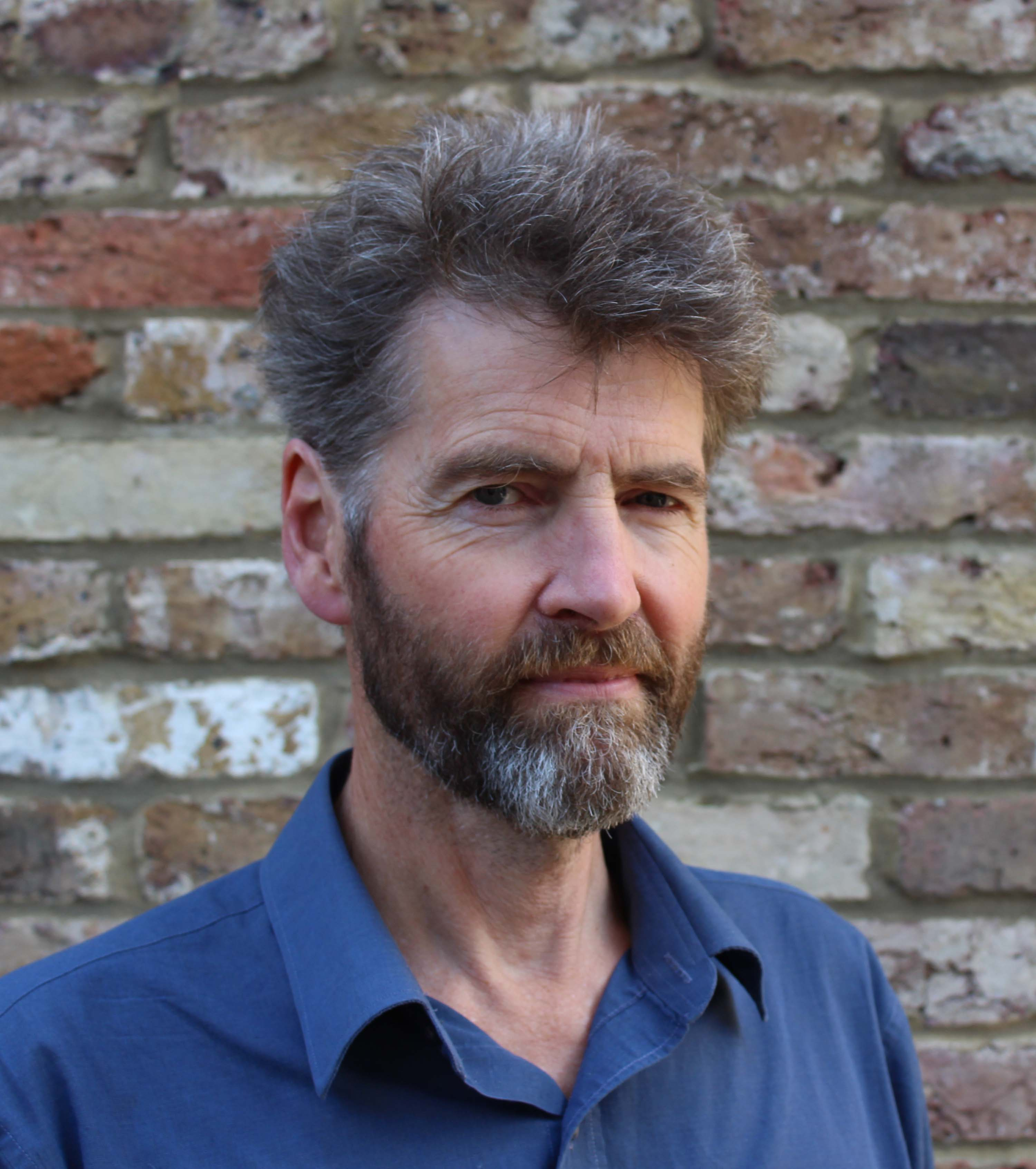
Neil Faulkner in 2015

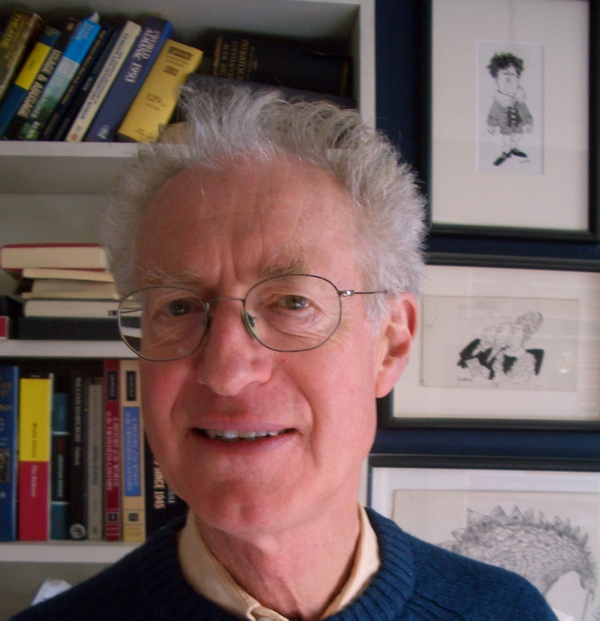
Bamber Gascoigne in 2006

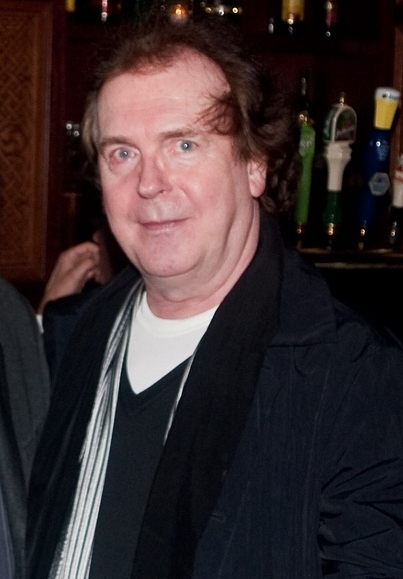
Ian McDonald in 2009

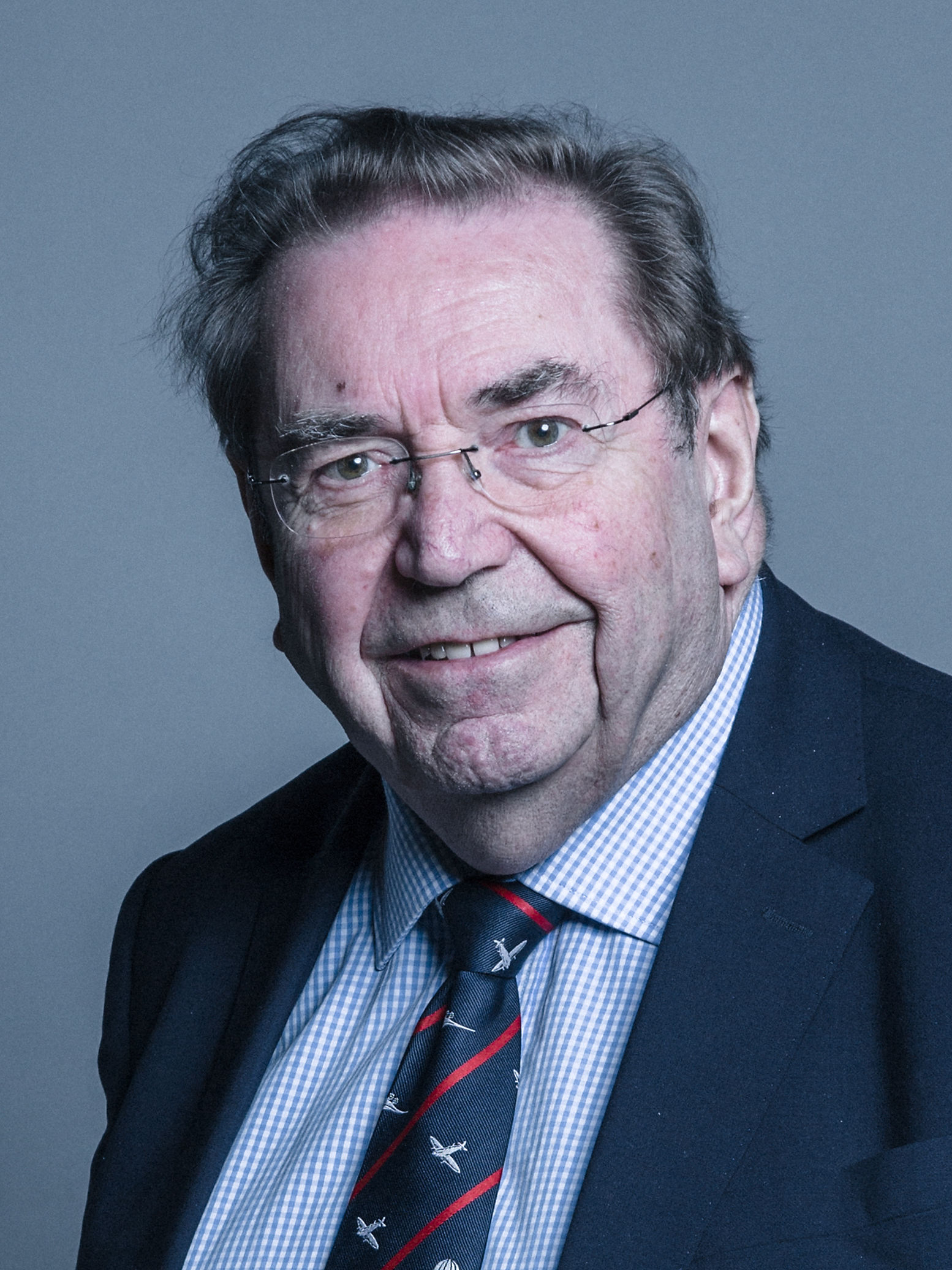
David Chidgey, Baron Chidgey in 2018

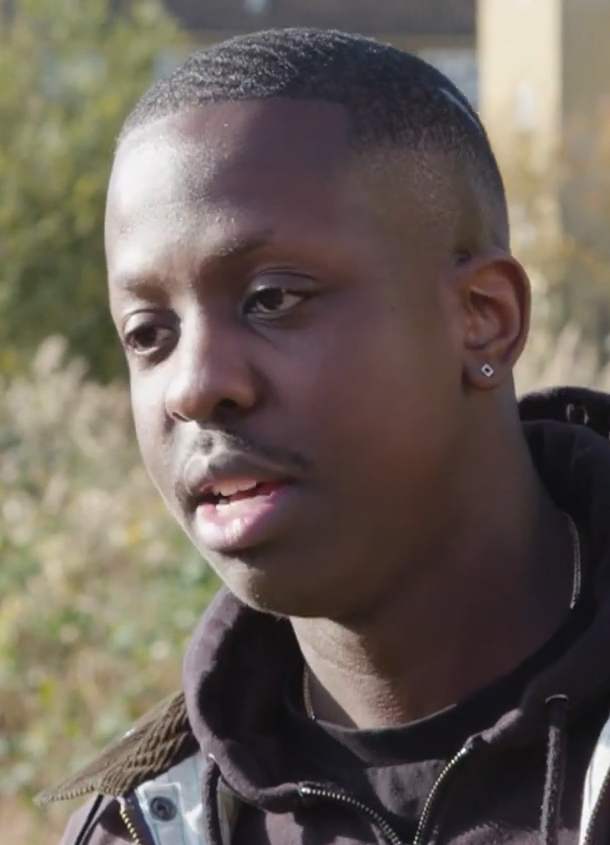
Jamal Edwards in 2019

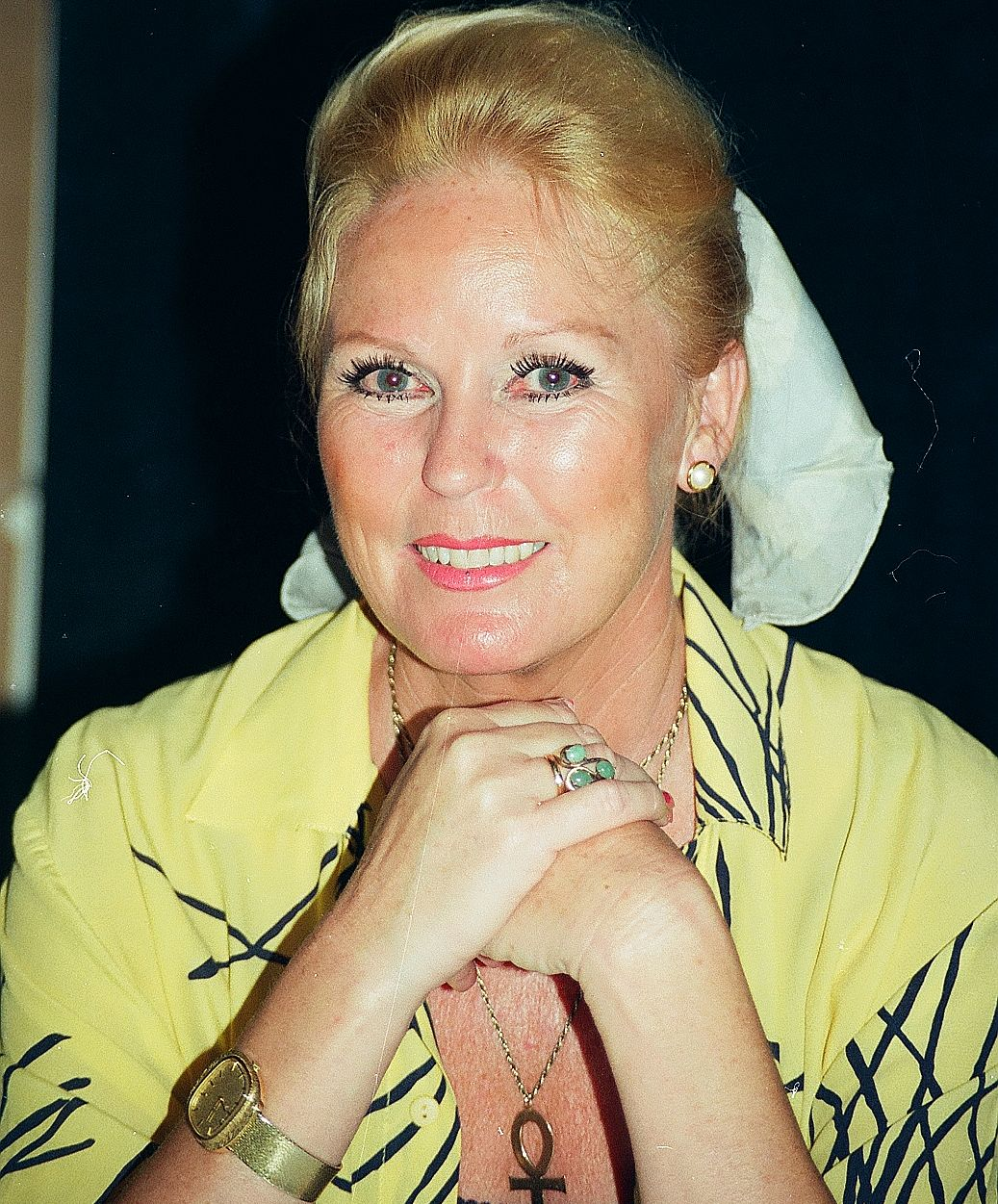
Veronica Carlson in 1995

- 3 February
  - Alex Ingram, Scottish professional footballer (Nottingham Forest), complications from dementia (b. 1945).
  - Sir Duncan Rice, Scottish academic (b. 1942).
- 4 February
  - Davie Cattanach, Scottish footballer (Stirling Albion, Celtic, Falkirk) (b. 1946).
  - Neil Faulkner, archaeologist, historian and writer, blood cancer (b. 1958).
  - Steve Finney, English professional footballer (Preston North End, Swindon Town, Carlisle United, Leyton Orient, Chester City) (b. 1973).
- 5 February – Ian Kennedy, Scottish comic artist (Dan Dare, Ro-Busters, Judge Dredd) (b. 1932).
- 7 February – Sir Christopher Slade, judge, Lord Justice of Appeal (1982–1991) (b. 1927).
- 8 February
  - Bamber Gascoigne, television presenter (University Challenge) and author (The Great Moghuls) (b. 1935).
  - Valentina Polukhina, Russian-born literary scholar (b. 1936).
- 9 February
  - Henry Danton, classical dancer (b. 1919).
  - Joseph Horovitz, Austrian-born composer (Captain Noah and His Floating Zoo) and conductor (b. 1926).
  - Ian McDonald, English multi-instrumental musician (King Crimson, Foreigner), colon cancer (b. 1946).
  - Peter Neilson, English-born New Zealand politician, minister of works and development (1990) and MP (1981–1990) (b. 1954).
- 10 February – Mick Newman, English amateur footballer (West Ham United) (b. 1932).
- 13 February
  - Aled Roberts, Welsh politician, AM (2011–2016) (b. 1962).
  - Beryl Vertue, English television producer (Men Behaving Badly, Sherlock), media executive and agent (b. 1931).
- 14 February
  - Geoff Barker, English footballer (Hull City, Darlington, Reading, Grimsby Town) (b. 1949).
  - Johnny Whiteley, English rugby league player (Hull F.C., Great Britain) (b. 1930).
- 15 February – David Chidgey, Baron Chidgey, politician, MP (1994–2005) and member of the House of Lords (since 2005) (b. 1942).
- 16 February
  - John Bowler, English football executive, chairman of Crewe Alexandra (1987–2021) (b. 1937).
  - Jack Smethurst, actor (Love Thy Neighbour, Man About the House, King Ralph) and comedian (b. 1932).
- 17 February
  - Steve Burtenshaw, English footballer (Brighton & Hove Albion) and manager (Sheffield Wednesday, Queens Park Rangers) (b. 1935).
  - Billy McEwan, Scottish footballer (Rotherham United, Chesterfield) and manager (Sheffield United) (b. 1951).
- 19 February
  - Doug Baillie, Scottish footballer (Falkirk, Airdrieonians, Rangers) (b. 1937).
  - Joey Beauchamp, English footballer (Oxford United, Swindon Town, West Ham United) (b. 1971).
  - Gary Brooker, English musician (Procol Harum), cancer (b. 1945).
  - Jan Pieńkowski, Polish-born author and illustrator of children's books (Meg and Mog) (b. 1936).
  - Sir Richard Shepherd, politician, MP (1979–2015) (b. 1942).
  - Christopher Stalford, Northern Irish politician, MLA (since 2016) (b. 1983).
- 20 February – Jamal Edwards, entrepreneur, author and DJ, founder of SB.TV (b. 1990).
- 22 February
  - David Banks, newspaper editor and broadcaster, editor of the Daily Mirror (1992–1994) (b. 1948).
  - Anna Karen, English actress (EastEnders, On the Buses, Carry On), house fire (b. 1936).
  - Josephine Veasey, mezzo-soprano (b. 1930).
- 24 February
  - Henry Lincoln, scriptwriter (Doctor Who), author (The Holy Blood and the Holy Grail) and actor (The Avengers) (b. 1930).
  - Cliff Stanford, entrepreneur, co-founder of Demon Internet, pancreatic cancer (b. 1954).
  - Sir Tony Wrigley, historian and demographer (b. 1931).
  - Catherine Wybourne, Benedictine nun, commentator, and blogger, cancer (b. 1954).
- 25 February – Shirley Hughes, English writer and illustrator (Dogger) (b. 1927).
- 27 February
  - Alan Anderson, Scottish footballer (Heart of Midlothian, Millwall, national team) (b. 1939).
  - Veronica Carlson, actress (Dracula Has Risen from the Grave, The Horror of Frankenstein, Frankenstein Must Be Destroyed) and model (b. 1944).
  - MC Skibadee, electronic music artist and MC (b. 1975).
- 28 February
  - Sir William Lithgow, 2nd Baronet, Scottish industrialist (b. 1934).
  - Sir Christopher Mallaby, diplomat, Ambassador to Germany (1988–1993) and Ambassador to France (1993–1996) (b. 1936).

== March ==
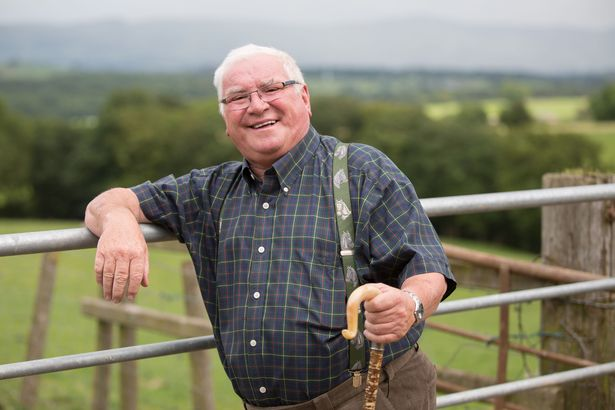
Dai Jones in 2017

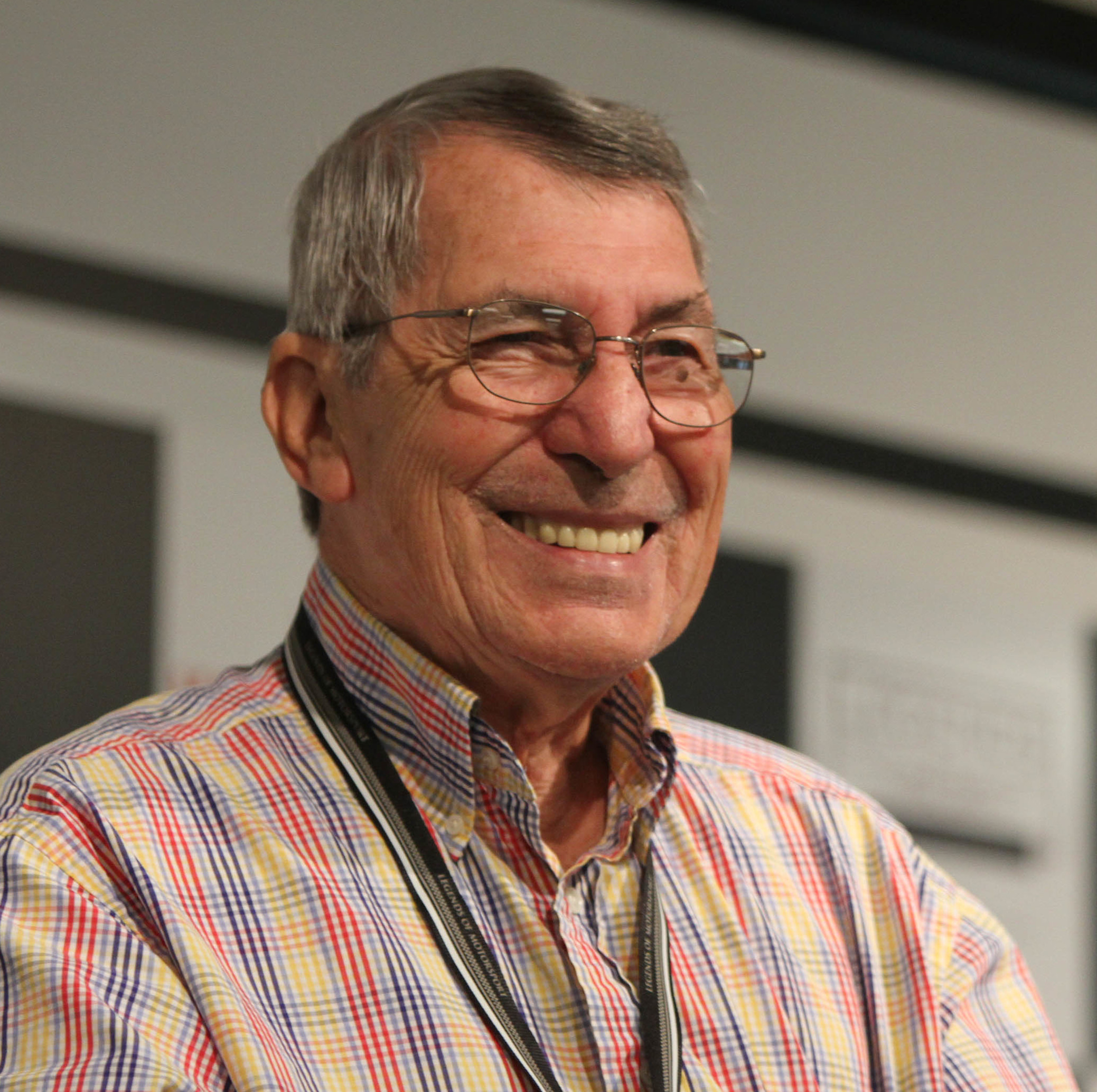
Vic Elford in 2010

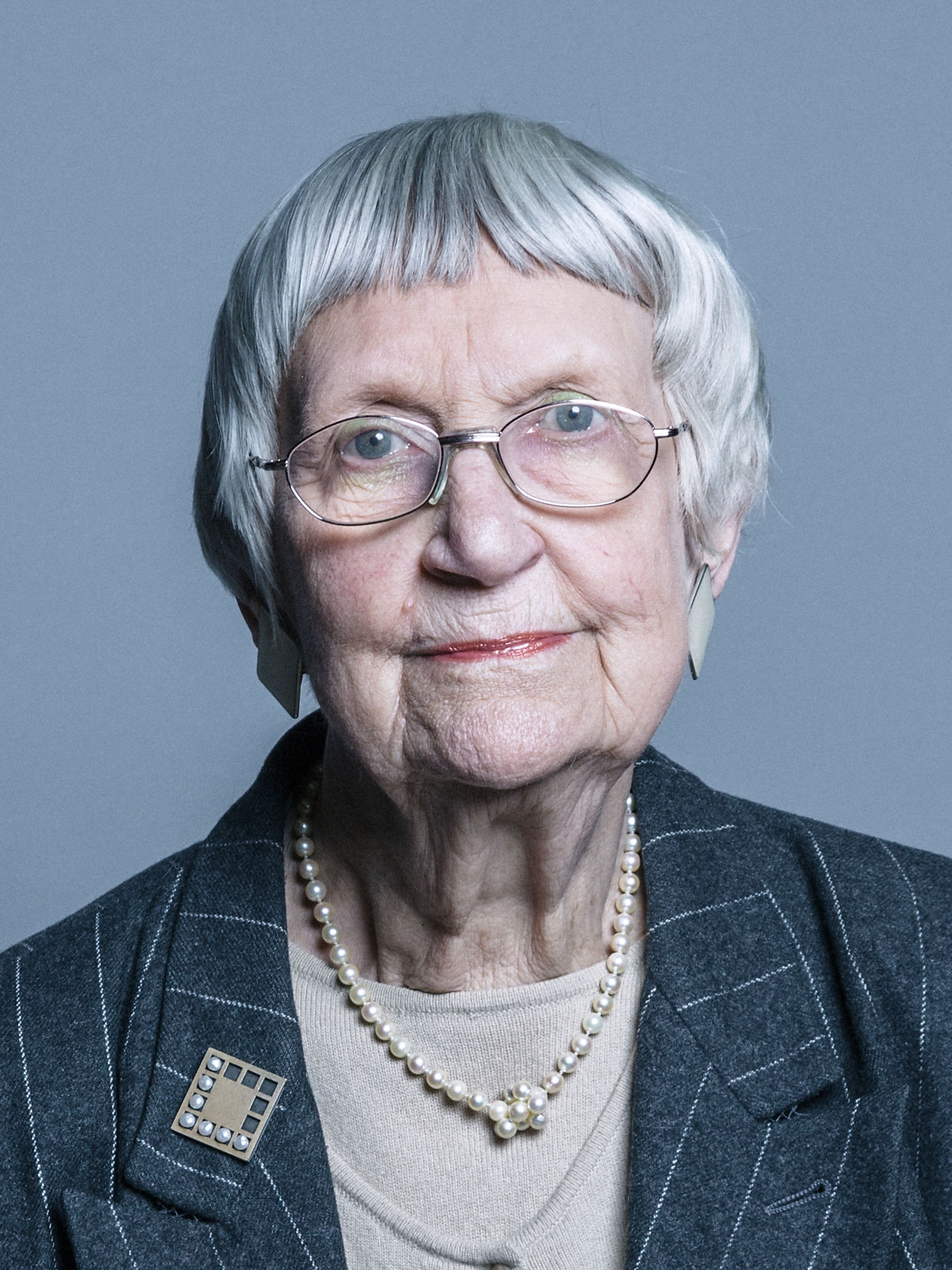
Elspeth Howe in 2018

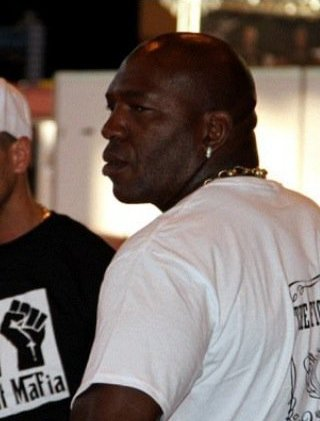
Barrington Patterson in 2015

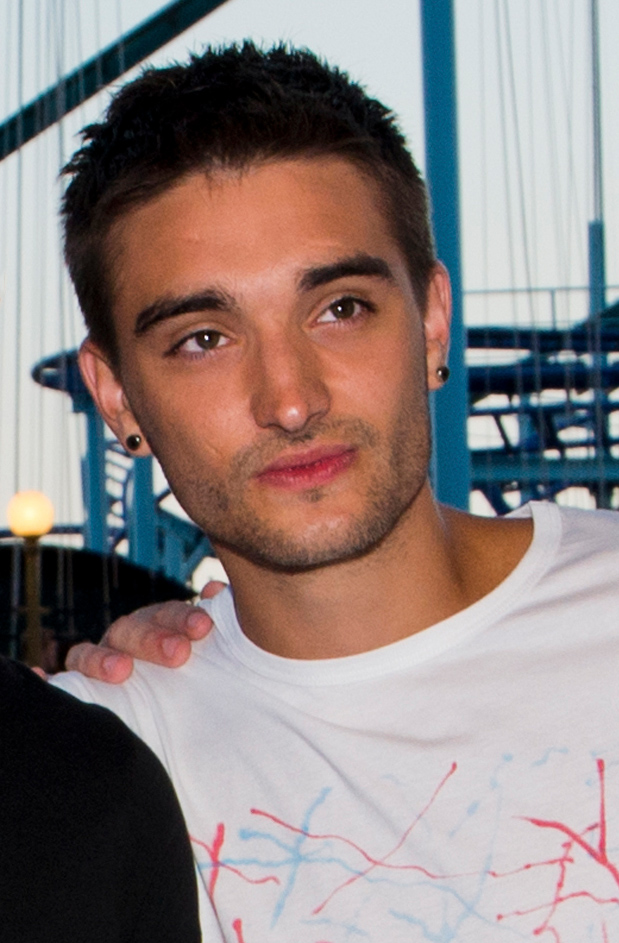
Tom Parker in 2013

- 1 March
  - Clement Crisp, dance critic (Financial Times) (b. 1926).
  - Bob Wellings, television presenter and journalist (Nationwide) (b. 1934).
- 2 March
  - Roger Graef, American-born documentary filmmaker, cancer (b. 1936).
  - John Stahl, Scottish actor (Game of Thrones, Victoria & Abdul, Take the High Road) (b. 1953).
  - Tony Walton, set and costume designer (Pippin, All That Jazz, Mary Poppins), Oscar and Tony winner, complications from a stroke (b. 1934).
- 3 March
  - Frank Connor, Scottish footballer (St Mirren, Albion Rovers) and manager (Raith Rovers) (b. 1936).
  - Sir Charles Gray, English barrister and judge (b. 1942).
- 4 March
  - Ruth Bidgood, Welsh poet (b. 1922).
  - Iwan Edwards, Welsh-born choral conductor (b. 1937).
  - Dai Jones, Welsh television presenter (Cefn Gwlad) (b. 1943).
  - Colin Lewis, Olympic racing cyclist (1964), cancer (b. 1942).
  - James Remnant, 3rd Baron Remnant, hereditary peer, member of the House of Lords (1967–1999) (b. 1930).
- 5 March – Lynda Baron, actress (Open All Hours, Come Outside, EastEnders, Still Open All Hours) (b. 1939).
- 6 March
  - Robbie Brightwell, sprinter, Olympic silver medalist (1964) (b. 1939).
  - Kenneth Ives, actor (Doctor Who) and director (Poldark, Secret Army) (b. 1934).
  - John Parlett, Olympic runner (1948) (b. 1925).
- 7 March
  - Paul Anderson, sailor, Olympic bronze medalist (1968) (b. 1935).
  - Sir Jeremy Child, 3rd Baronet, actor (Privilege, The Stud, Darkest Hour) (b. 1944).
  - Geoffrey Thorndike Martin, Egyptologist (b. 1934).
- 8 March
  - Gordon Lee, English footballer (Aston Villa) and manager (Newcastle United, Everton) (b. 1934).
  - Ron Pember, English actor (Secret Army, Oh! What a Lovely War, Murder by Decree), stage director, and dramatist (b. 1934).
- 9 March – Joe D'Orazio, professional wrestler (b. 1922).
- 10 March – Sir John Elliott, historian and Hispanist, pneumonia (b. 1930).
- 11 March – Sir William Fittall, civil servant, secretary general of the Archbishops' Council (2002–2015) (b. 1953).
- 13 March
  - Vic Elford, English racing driver, cancer (b. 1935).
  - Mary Lee, Scottish singer (b. 1921).
- 15 March
  - Tom Barnett, English footballer (Romford, Crystal Palace, St Albans City) (b. 1936).
  - David Stephenson, rugby league player (Salford Red Devils, Wigan Warriors, Leeds Rhinos) (b. 1958).
- 16 March – Tony Marchi, English footballer (Tottenham Hotspur, Vicenza) and manager (Northampton Town) (b. 1933).
- 17 March – Peter Bowles, English actor (Rumpole of the Bailey, The Irish R.M., Executive Stress, To the Manor Born, The Bounder) (b. 1936).
- 18 March – Andy Lochhead, Scottish footballer (Burnley, Aston Villa, Leicester City) (b. 1941).
- 19 March – Dave Sims, English rugby union player (Gloucester, Exeter Chiefs, national team) (b. 1969).
- 20 March – Ralph Riach, Scottish actor (Hamish Macbeth, Lost Empires, Braveheart) (b. 1936).
- 22 March
  - Elspeth Howe, Baroness Howe of Idlicote, peer, member of the House of Lords (2001–2020) and wife of Geoffrey Howe, cancer (b. 1932).
  - Barrington Patterson, English kickboxer and mixed martial artist, heart attack (b. 1965).
- 23 March
  - Terry Darracott, English footballer (Everton, Tulsa Roughnecks, Wrexham) (b. 1950).
  - Jimmy Lindley, jockey (b. 1935).
- 24 March
  - Denise Coffey, actress (Waltz of the Toreadors, Georgy Girl, Sir Henry at Rawlinson End), comedian and writer (b. 1936).
  - John McLeod, Scottish composer (b. 1934).
- 25 March
  - Sir John Chapple, military officer, Commander-in-Chief, Land Forces (1987–1988), Chief of the General Staff (1988–1992) and Governor of Gibraltar (1993–1995) (b. 1931).
  - Philip Jeck, English composer (b. 1952).
- 26 March
  - Garry Leach, comic book artist (Judge Dredd, Tharg's Future Shocks, Dan Dare) (b. 1954).
  - Tina May, jazz singer, cancer (b. 1961).
- 29 March – Alan Wooler, English footballer (Aldershot, FinnPa, Boston Minutemen) and manager (b. 1953).
- 30 March – Tom Parker, English singer (The Wanted), brain tumour (b. 1988).

== April ==
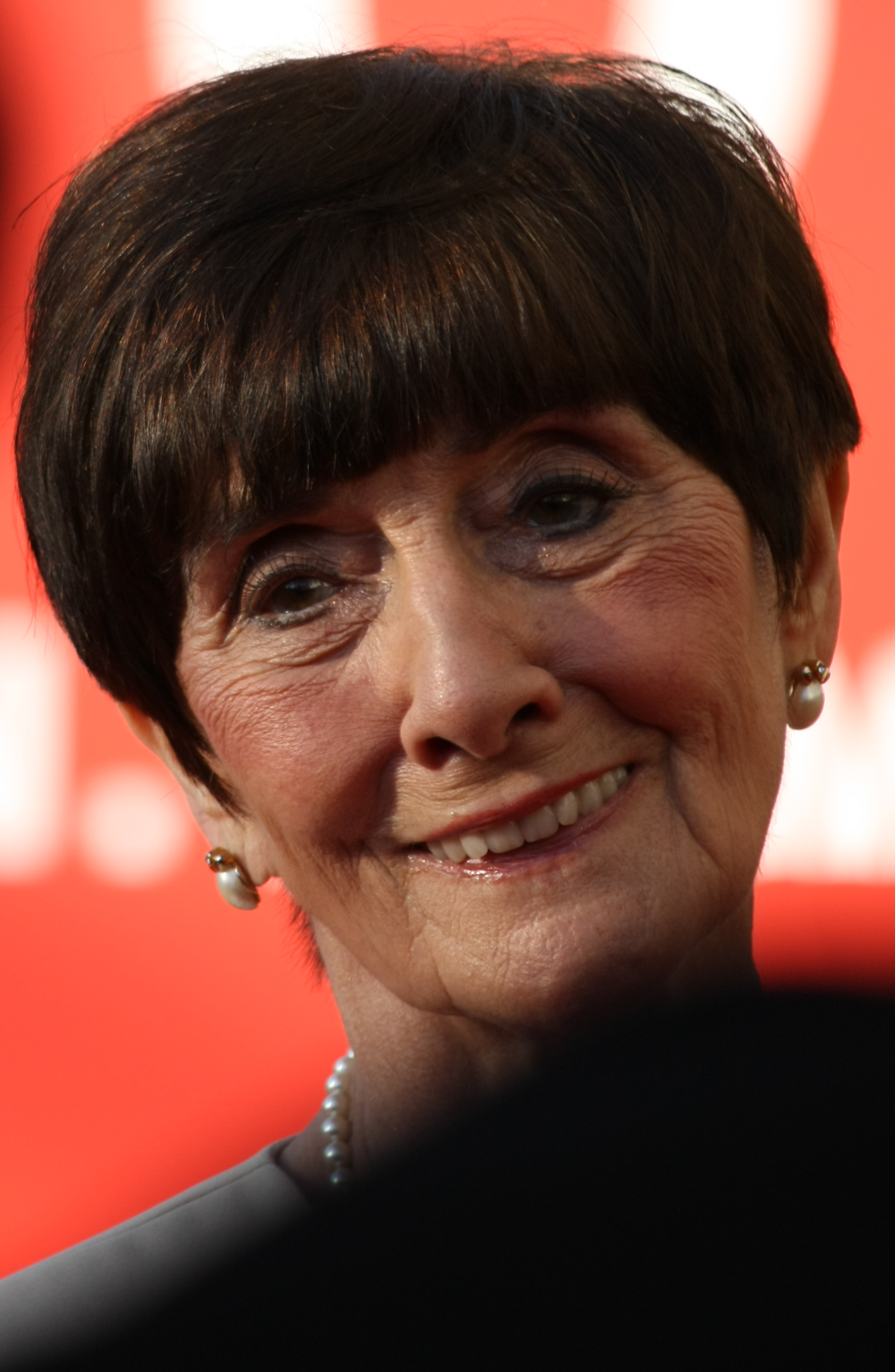
June Brown in 2009

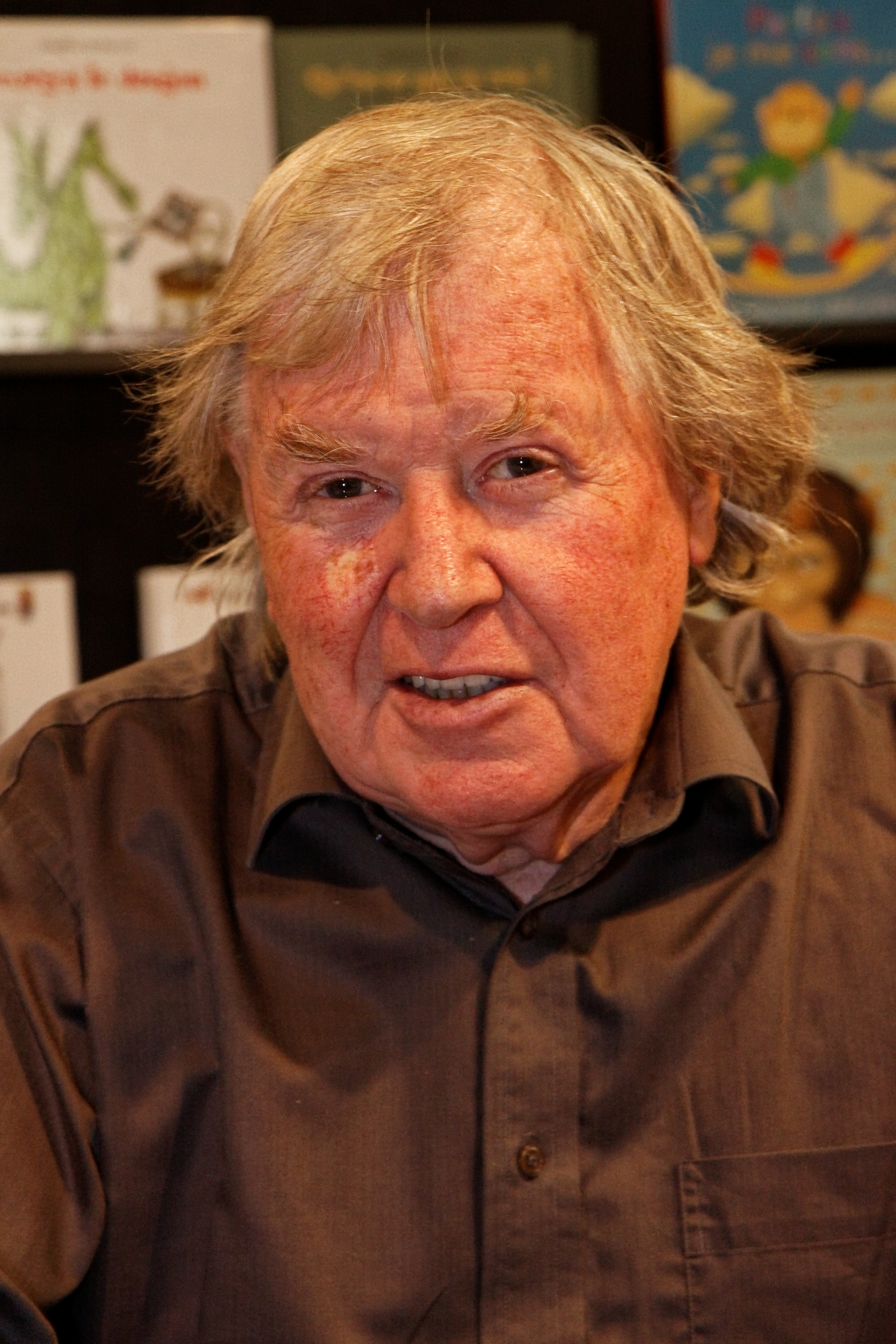
David McKee in 2011

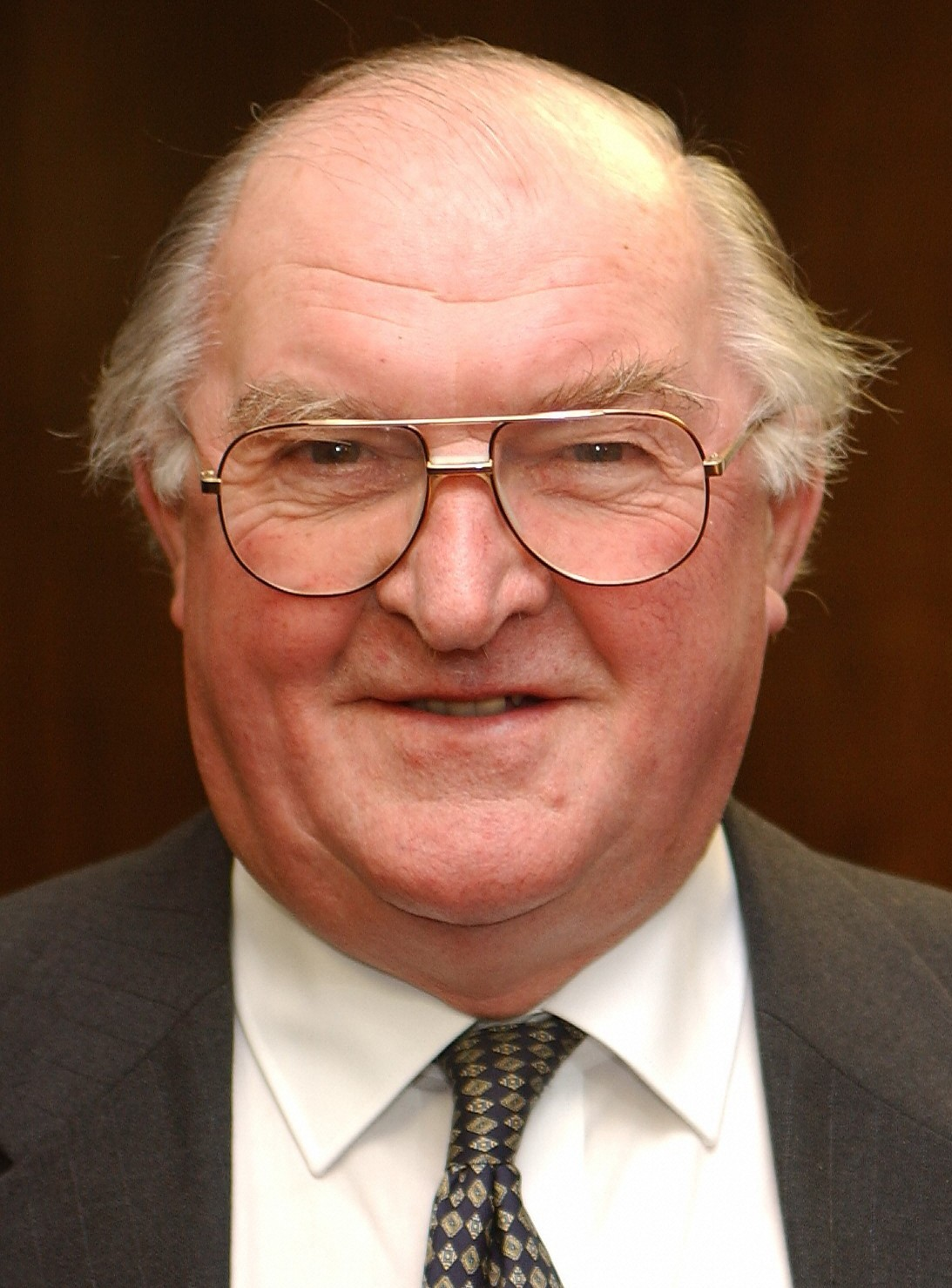
Henry Plumb, Baron Plumb in 2001

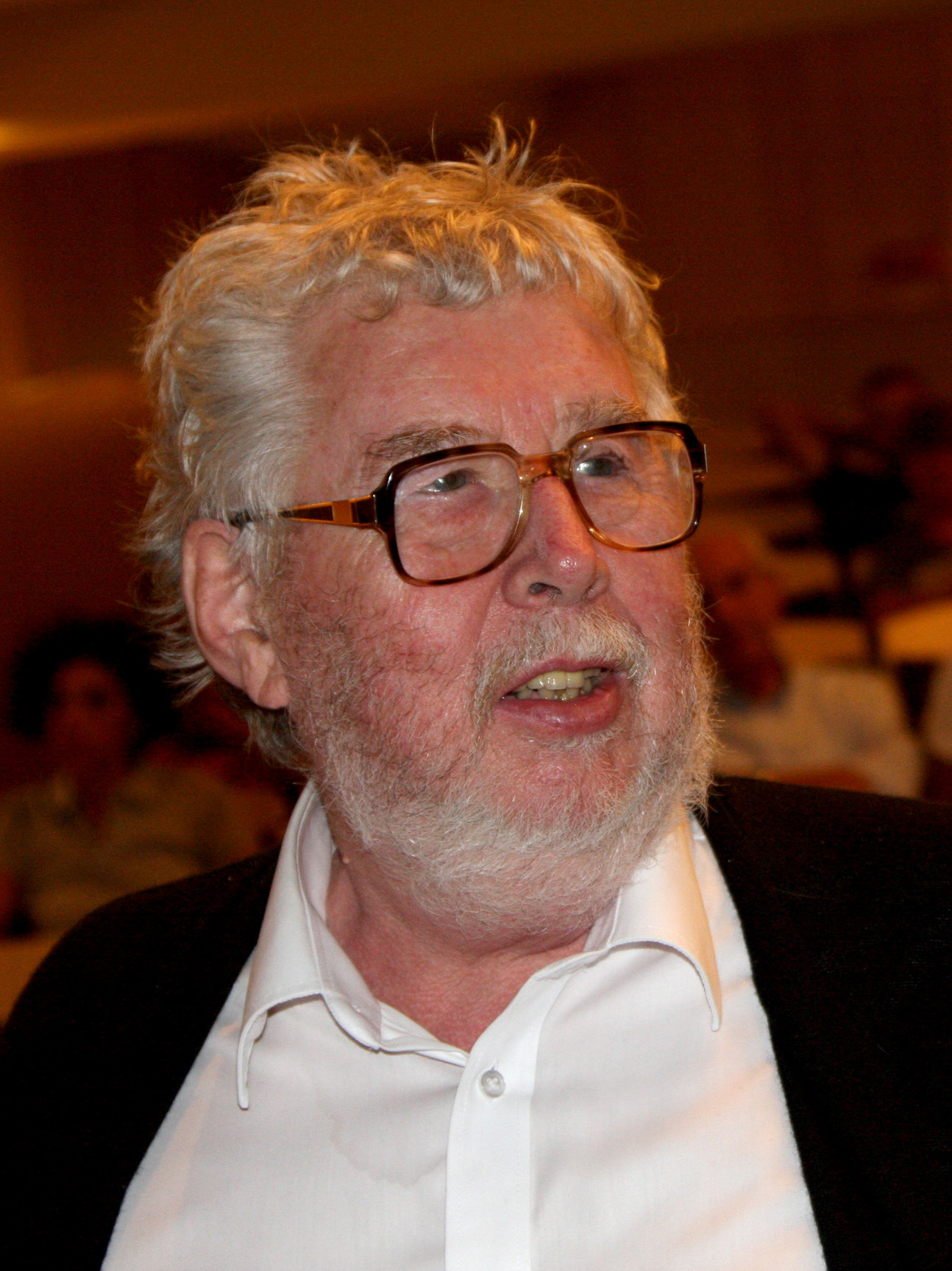
Harrison Birtwistle in 2008

- 3 April
  - June Brown, English actress (EastEnders, The Duchess of Duke Street, Bean) and author (b. 1927).
  - Gerald Coates, English evangelist (b. 1944).
  - Pamela Rooke, model and actress, bile duct cancer (b. 1953).
  - Desmond Seward, historian (b. 1935).
- 4 April
  - Richard Bird, 79, English computer scientist of Lincoln College, Oxford (b. 1943).
  - John McNally, Northern Ireland-born boxer, Olympic silver medallist (1952) (b. 1932).
- 5 April – Edward Rayner, English footballer (Northwich Victoria, Stoke City, Macclesfield Town) (b. 1932).
- 6 April
  - Jill Knight, politician, MP (1966–1997), member of the House of Lords (1997–2016) (b. 1923).
  - David McKee, writer and illustrator (Elmer the Patchwork Elephant, Not Now, Bernard) (b. 1935).
  - Tom Smith, Scottish rugby union player (Northampton Saints, national team, British & Irish Lions), colorectal cancer (b. 1971).
- 7 April
  - Christopher Ball, composer (b. 1936).
  - Mary Green, Olympic athlete (1968) (b. 1943).
- 8 April – Brian Winston, journalist (b. 1941).
- 9 April
  - Jack Higgins, author (The Eagle Has Landed, Thunder Point, Angel of Death) (b. 1929).
  - Jeremy Young, actor (Doctor Who, Coronation Street, Crooks and Coronets) (b. 1934).
- 14 April – Con Sullivan, English footballer (Bristol City, Arsenal) (b. 1928).
- 15 April – Henry Plumb, Baron Plumb, politician, member (1979–1999) and president (1987–1989) of the European Parliament, member of the House of Lords (1987–2017) (b. 1925).
- 16 April – Sir Ray Tindle, entrepreneur and founder of Tindle (b. 1926).
- 17 April – Jimmy Harris, English footballer (Everton, Birmingham City, Oldham Athletic) (b. 1933).
- 18 April
  - Sir Harrison Birtwistle, composer (The Triumph of Time, The Mask of Orpheus, Gawain, The Minotaur) (b. 1934).
  - Wilfred Cass, German-born entrepreneur and arts philanthropist (b. 1924).
  - Graham Fyfe, Scottish footballer (Rangers, Hibernian, Dumbarton) (b. 1951).
  - Barbara Hall, crossword compiler and advice columnist (b. 1922).
- 19 April
  - Mike Gregory, English darts player (b. 1956).
  - John McKay, mathematician (McKay conjecture, McKay graph) (b. 1939).
  - Henry Scott-Stokes, journalist (Financial Times, The Times, The New York Times) (b. 1938).
  - Norman Surplus, Northern Irish adventurer, first person to circumnavigate the world in an autogyro (b. 1963).
- 21 April
  - Eric Chappell, English screenwriter (The Squirrels, Rising Damp, Home to Roost) (b. 1933).
  - Sir Geoffrey Howlett, Army general, commander-in-chief of the Allied Forces Northern Europe (1986–1989) (b. 1930).
- 24 April
  - Yvonne Blenkinsop, English fishing safety campaigner (b. 1938).
  - Ronald R. Van Stockum, English-born American military officer (b. 1916).
- 26 April – Ann Davies, English actress (Doctor Who, EastEnders, Peter's Friends) (b. 1934).
- 28 April – Tanya Brady, English rower, equestrian accident, (b. 1973).
- 29 April – Tarsame Singh Saini, singer (b. 1967).
- 30 April – Neil Campbell, English footballer (Doncaster Rovers, Scarborough, Barrow) (b. 1977).

== May ==
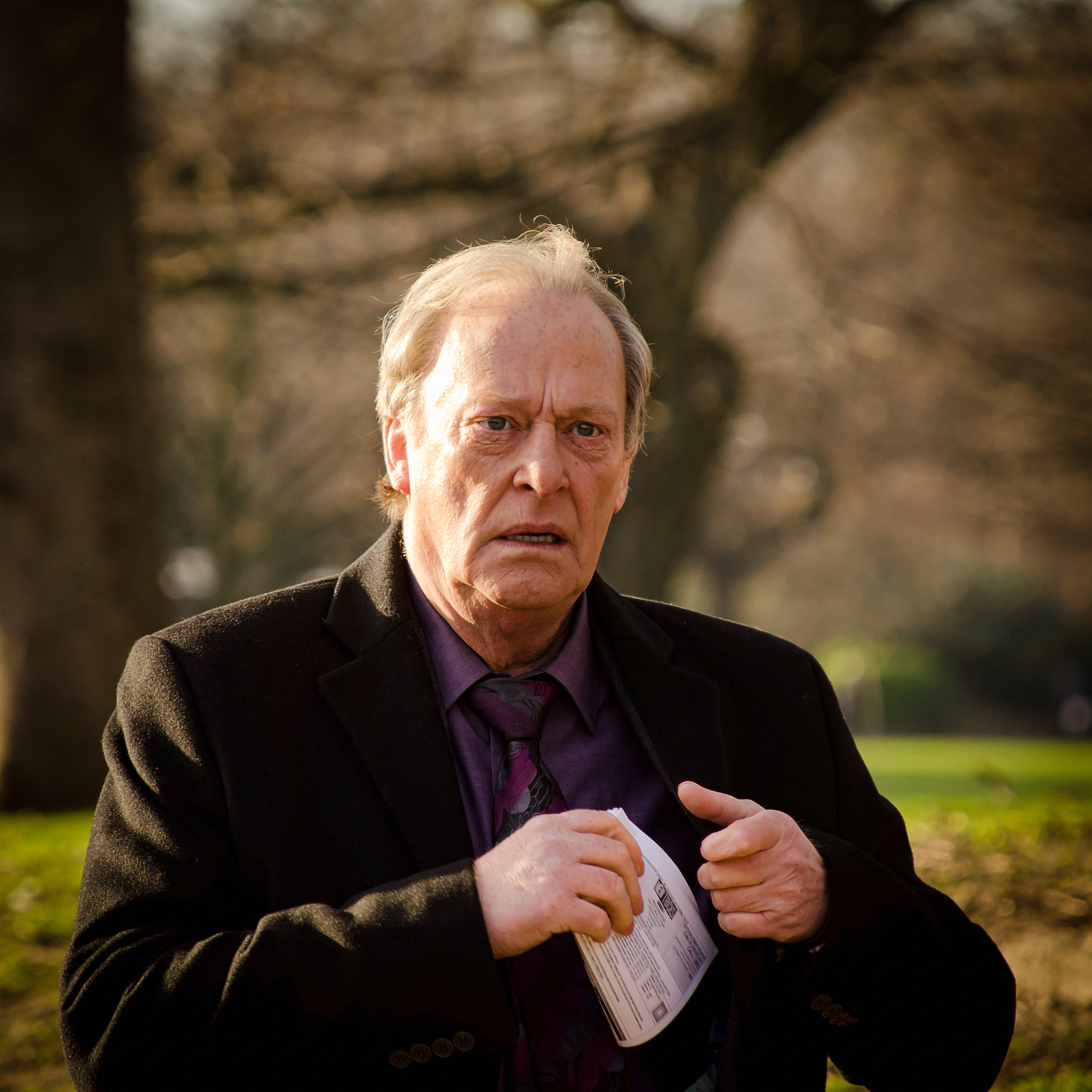
Dennis Waterman in 2012

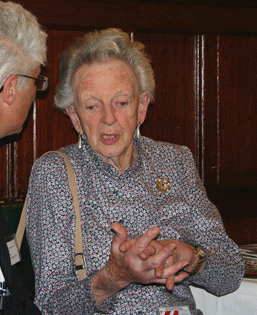
Pamela Sharples, Baroness Sharples in 2012

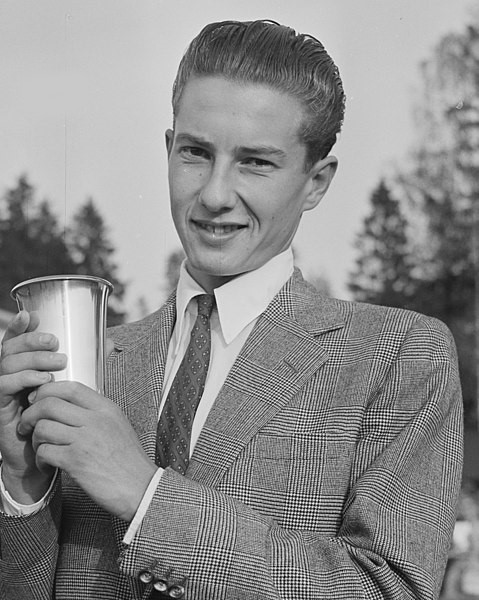
Lester Piggott in 1955

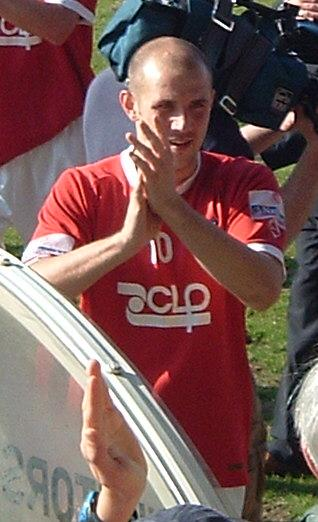
Craig Farrell in 2007

- 1 May – Ric Parnell, English drummer (Atomic Rooster, Spinal Tap) and actor (This Is Spinal Tap) (b. 1951).
- 3 May – Tony Brooks, racing driver (Formula One) (b. 1932).
- 5 May
  - Sir James Anderton, police officer, chief constable of Greater Manchester Police (1976–1991) (b. 1932).
  - Amanda Claridge, archaeologist, cancer (b. 1949).
- 7 May
  - Sir Paul Mellars, archaeologist (b. 1939).
  - Robin Parkinson, English actor ('Allo 'Allo!, Button Moon, Twisted Nerve) (b. 1929).
- 8 May
  - Syd Farrimond, English footballer (Bolton Wanderers, Tranmere Rovers, Halifax Town), complications from dementia (b. 1940).
  - Robert Gillmor, wildlife artist and illustrator (b. 1936).
  - Dennis Waterman, English actor (Minder, The Sweeney, New Tricks) and singer (b. 1948).
- 10 May – James A. Beckford, sociologist (b. 1942).
- 11 May – William Bennett, flautist (b. 1936).
- 13 May
  - Ricky Gardiner, Scottish guitarist and composer (b. 1948).
  - Sir Angus Grossart, Scottish merchant banker and newspaper executive (Daily Record, Sunday Mail) (b. 1937).
  - Simon Preston, English organist, conductor, and composer (b. 1938).
- 15 May
  - Sir Shane Blewitt, courtier and military officer (b. 1935).
  - Kay Mellor, English actress, scriptwriter and director (Children's Ward, Families, Fat Friends) (b. 1951).
- 17 May
  - Maurice Lindsay, sports administrator (Preston North End, Wigan Warriors) (b. 1941).
  - Rick Price, English bassist (The Move, Wizzard) (b. 1944).
- 18 May
  - Brian Bedford, Welsh professional footballer (Reading, Southampton, AFC Bournemouth, Queens Park Rangers, Scunthorpe United, Brentford) (b. 1933).
  - Cathal Coughlan, Irish singer and musician (Microdisney, The Fatima Mansions) (b. 1960).
  - Anne Howells, operatic mezzo-soprano (b. 1941).
- 19 May
  - Abdul Gaffar Chowdhury, Bangladeshi-born journalist and songwriter ("Ekusher Gaan") (b. 1934).
  - Pamela Sharples, Baroness Sharples, member of the House of Lords (1973–2017) and wife of Sir Richard Sharples (b. 1923).
- 20 May – Sir Colin Campbell, lawyer, vice-chancellor of the University of Nottingham (1988–2008) (b. 1944).
- 22 May
  - Les Dyl, English rugby league player (Leeds Rhinos, Bramley, national team) (b. 1952).
  - Colin Forbes, graphic designer (b. 1928).
  - Hazel Henderson, British-American futurist and economist (b. 1933).
- 24 May – Derek Stokes, English footballer (Huddersfield Town, Bradford City, Dundalk) (b. 1939).
- 26 May
  - Sir Arnold Burgen, physician, pharmacologist and academic (b. 1922).
  - John Dodson, 3rd Baron Monk Bretton, peer, member of the House of Lords (1948–1999) (b. 1924).
  - Andy Fletcher, keyboard player and DJ (Depeche Mode) (b. 1961).
  - Neil O'Donnell, Scottish professional footballer (Norwich City, Gillingham, Sheffield Wednesday) (b. 1949).
  - Alan White, drummer (Yes, Plastic Ono Band) (b. 1949).
  - Jimmy Whitehouse, English professional footballer (Reading, Coventry City, Millwall) (b. 1934).
- 28 May
  - Patricia Brake, English actress (Porridge, Going Straight, Manhunt), cancer (b. 1942).
  - Bob Hall, British sports journalist (Central News, Soccer Saturday, Black Country Radio) (b. 1945).
- 29 May – Lester Piggott, English jockey, nine-time Epsom Derby winner (b. 1935).
- 30 May – Craig Farrell, English footballer (Carlisle United, York City, Whitby Town) (b. 1982).
- 31 May – Jim Parks, English cricketer (Sussex, Somerset, national team), complications from a fall (b. 1931).

== June ==
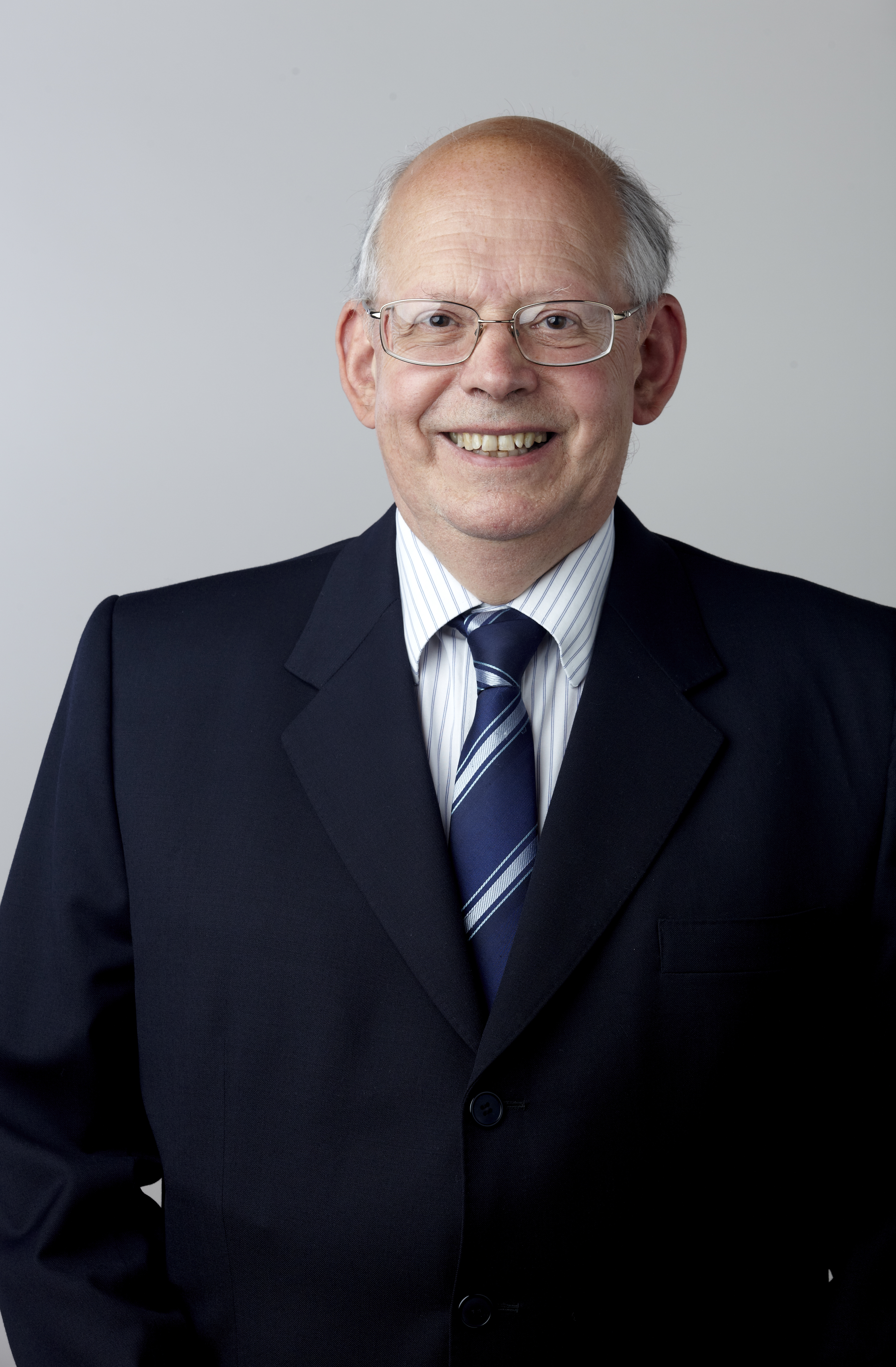
Richard Edwin Hills in 2014

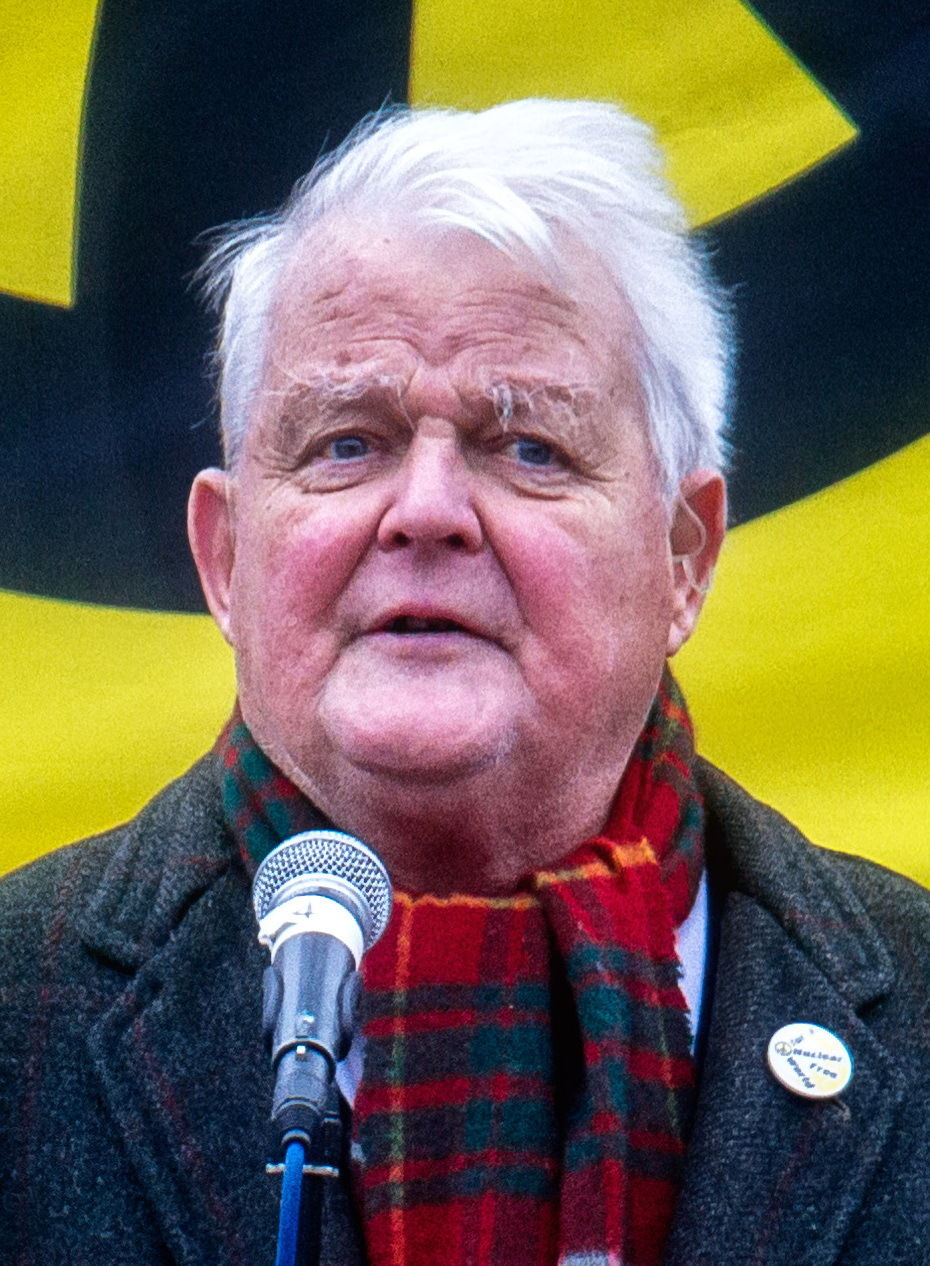
Bruce Kent at the #StopTrident protest in London in 2016

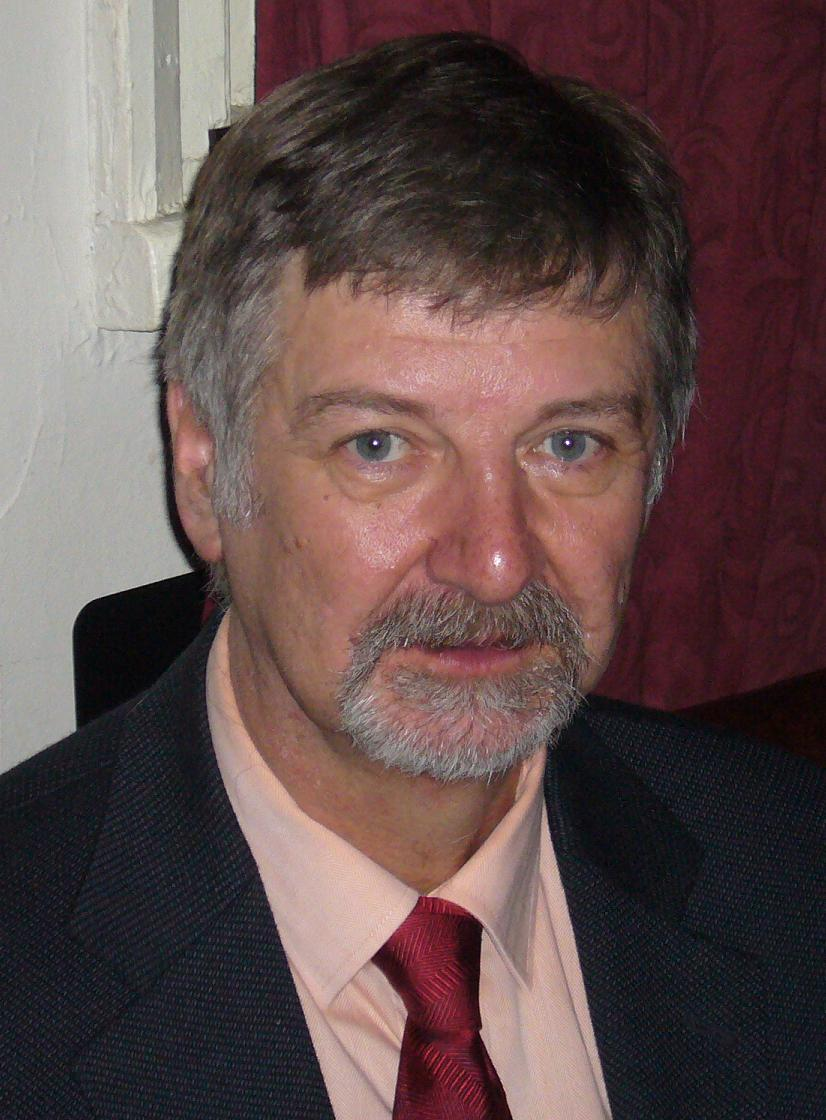
Terry Sanderson

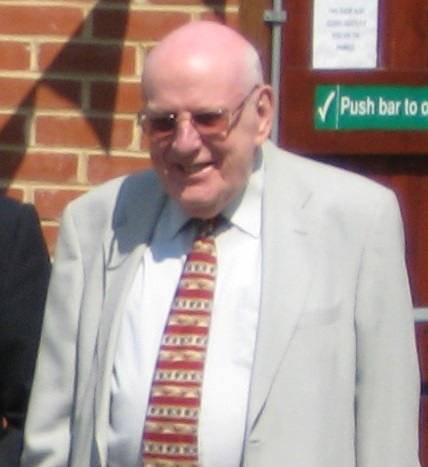
Frank Williams in 2011

- 3 June
  - Frank Clarke, English footballer (Shrewsbury Town, Queens Park Rangers, Ipswich Town, Carlisle United) (b. 1942).
  - Geoff Hunter, English footballer (Crewe Alexandra, Port Vale, Wrexham) (b. 1959).
- 4 June
  - Peter Neale, English footballer (Oldham Athletic, Scunthorpe United, Chesterfield F.C.) (b. 1934).
  - Sir David Nicholas, broadcast journalist, ITN editor and chief executive (1977–1989) (b. 1930).
- 5 June
  - John Bates, fashion designer, cancer (b. 1935).
  - Shaun Greatbatch, English darts player (b. 1969).
  - Richard Edwin Hills, astronomer (b. 1945).
  - Dom Phillips, journalist, murdered (b. 1964).
  - Roger Swinfen Eady, 3rd Baron Swinfen, politician and philanthropist, member of the House of Lords (since 1977) (b. 1938).
- 6 June – David Hughes, astronomer (b. 1941).
- 8 June
  - Revel Guest, filmmaker, journalist and author (b. 1931).
  - Bruce Kent, priest and activist (Campaign for Nuclear Disarmament) (b. 1929).
  - David Lloyd-Jones, orchestral conductor (b. 1934).
  - Dame Paula Rego, Portuguese-British visual artist (b. 1935).
- 9 June
  - Billy Bingham, Northern Irish footballer (Sunderland, national team) and manager (Plymouth Argyle) (b. 1931).
  - Ron Farmer, professional footballer (Coventry City, Nottingham Forest, Notts County) (b. 1936).
- 10 June
  - Zoltán Dörnyei, Hungarian-born linguist (b. 1960).
  - Bobby Hope, Scottish footballer (West Bromwich Albion, national team) and manager (Bromsgrove Rovers) (b. 1943).
- 11 June
  - Hilary Devey, English businesswoman and television personality (Dragons' Den) (b. 1957).
  - Peter Scupham, poet (b. 1933).
  - Donald Singer, clinical pharmacologist, president of the Fellowship of Postgraduate Medicine (b. 1954).
- 12 June
  - Phil Bennett, Welsh rugby union player (Barbarians, Llanelli, national team) (b. 1948).
  - Alex Russell, footballer (Southport, Blackburn Rovers, Tranmere Rovers) (b. 1944).
  - Terry Sanderson, secularist and gay rights activist, bladder cancer (b. 1946).
- 13 June – Maureen Hiron, games designer (Continuo) and bridge player (b. 1942).
- 14 June
  - Bill Ashurst, English rugby league footballer (Wigan, Penrith Panthers, Great Britain national team) and coach (b. 1948).
  - Davie Wilson, Scottish footballer (Rangers, Dundee United, national team) and manager (b. 1937).
- 16 June – Gordon Peters, actor (Dad's Army, Are You Being Served?, One Foot in the Grave) (b. 1926).
- 19 June – Colin Grainger, English footballer (Sheffield United, Sunderland, national team) (b. 1933).
- 20 June – Bruce Crawford, English footballer (Blackpool, Tranmere Rovers) (b. 1938).
- 22 June – Graham Tutt, English footballer (Charlton Athletic) (b. 1956).
- 23 June – Sally Greengross, Baroness Greengross, politician, member of the House of Lords (since 2000) and wife of Alan Greengross (b. 1935).
- 24 June – Harry Gration, English journalist and broadcaster (Look North) (b. 1950).
- 25 June – John Manningham-Buller, 2nd Viscount Dilhorne, peer and barrister (b. 1932).
- 26 June – Frank Williams, English actor (Dad's Army, You Rang, M'Lord?, Hi-de-Hi!) (b. 1931).
- 27 June
  - Sir Colin Blakemore, neurobiologist (b. 1944).
  - Jasmine Burkitt, English television personality (Small Teen, Bigger World) (b. 1993).
- 28 June – Dame Deborah James, English journalist (You, Me and the Big C), bowel cancer (b. 1981).

== July ==
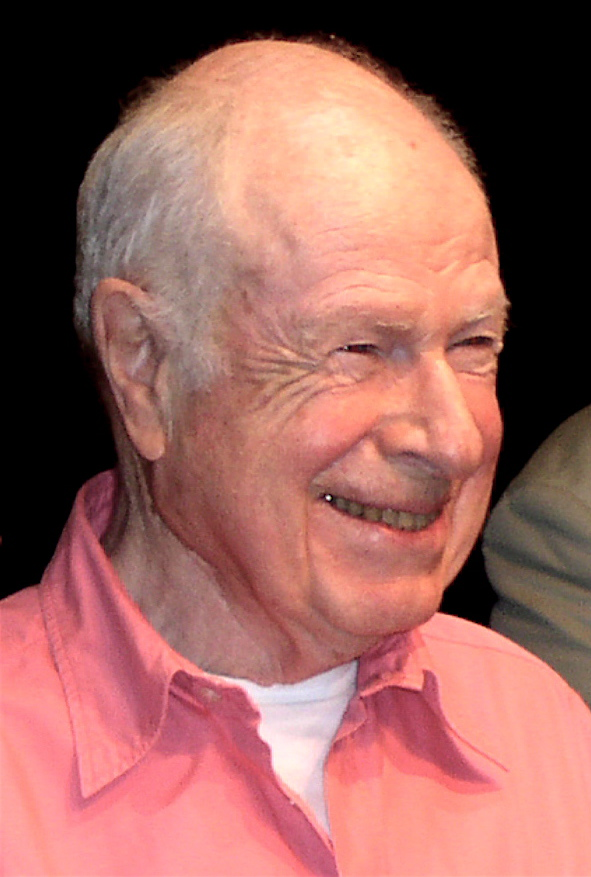
Peter Brook in 2009

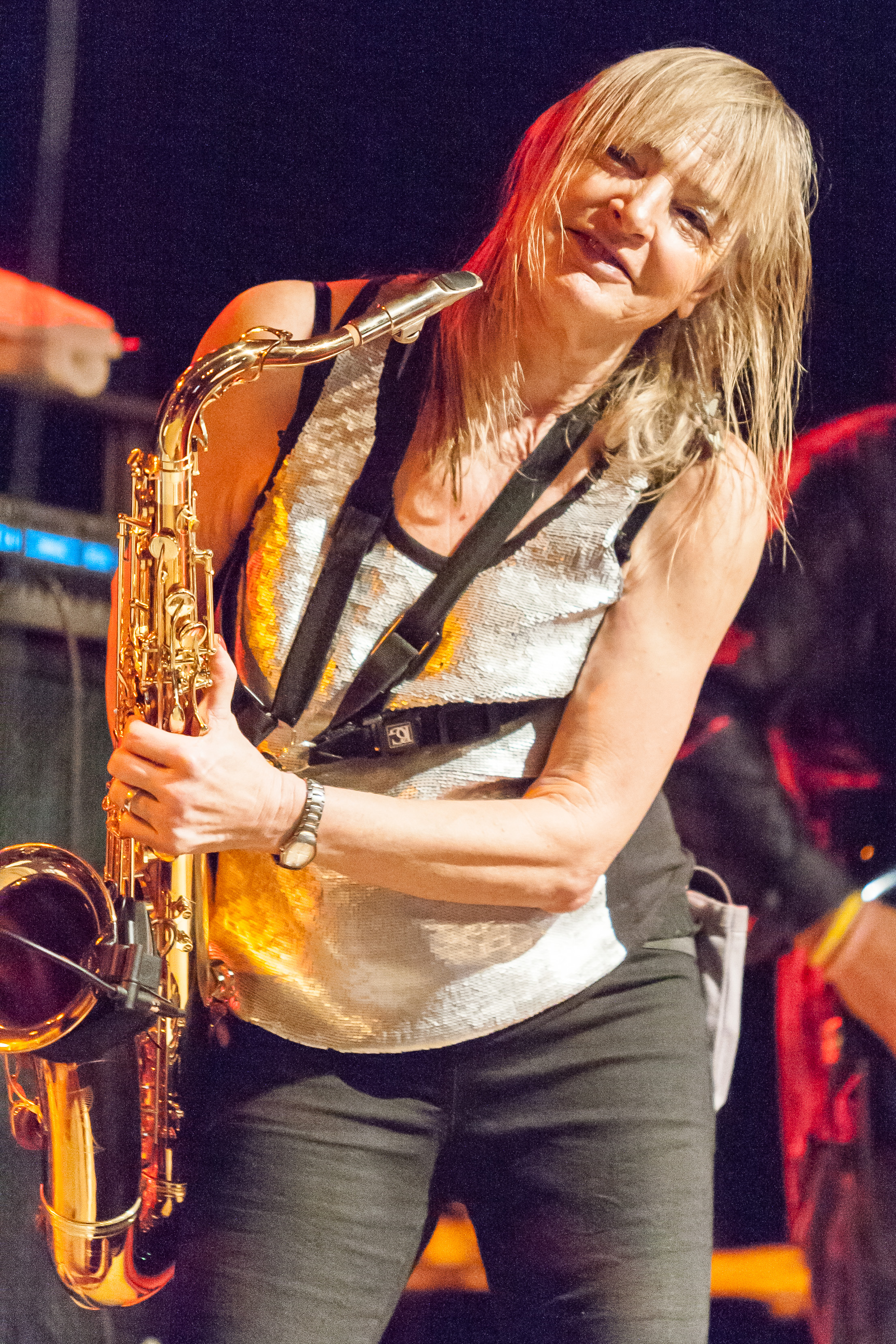
Barbara Thompson in 2010

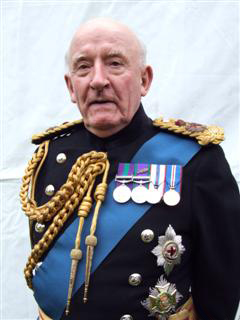
Peter Inge, Baron Inge in 2007

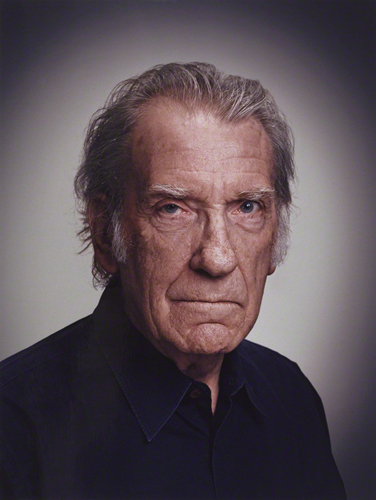
David Warner in 2013

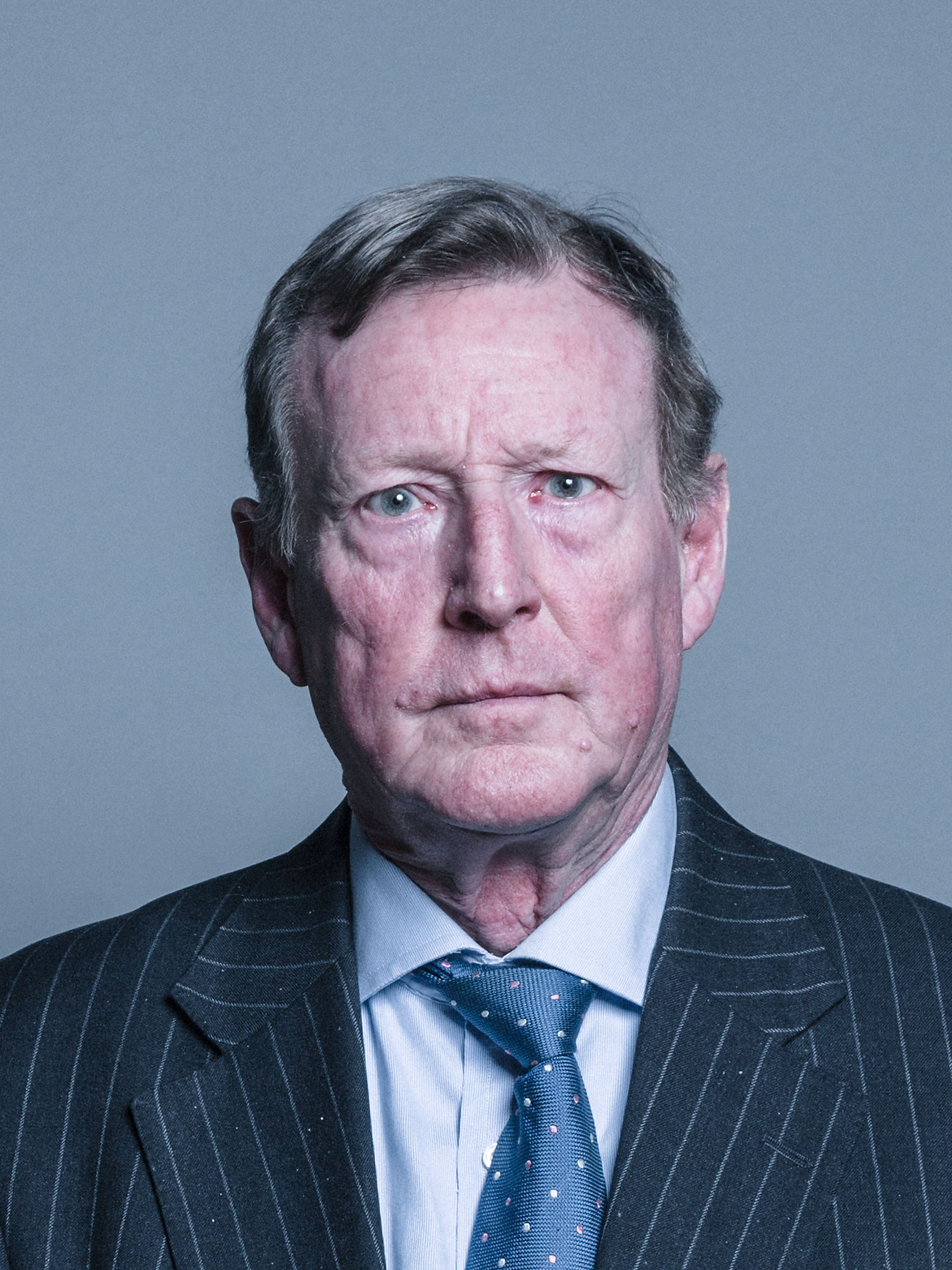
David Trimble in 2018

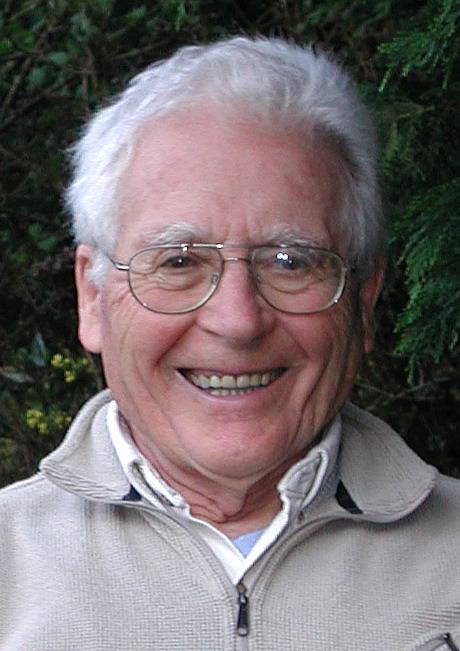
James Lovelock in 2005

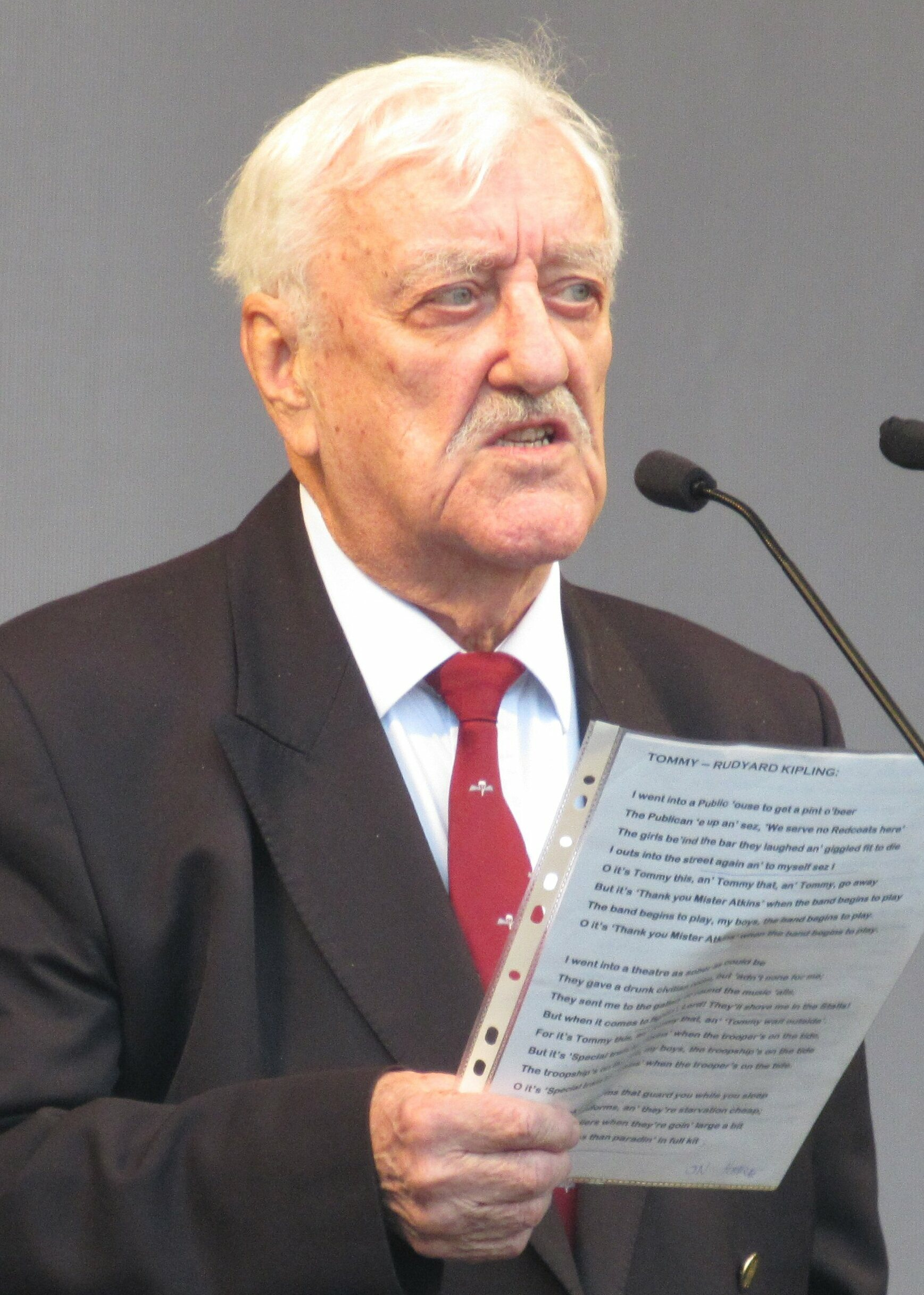
Bernard Cribbins in 2015

- 1 July
  - Drew Busby, Scottish footballer (Airdrieonians, Hearts, Toronto Blizzard) (b. 1947).
  - Gary Pearson, English footballer (York City, Darlington) and manager (Crook Town) (b. 1976).
- 2 July
  - Peter Brook, theatre and film director (Lord of the Flies, Ride of the Valkyrie, Marat/Sade), Tony winner (1966, 1971) (b. 1921).
  - Alain de Cadenet, English racing driver and television presenter (Legends of Motorsport, Victory by Design), bile duct cancer (b. 1945).
  - Andy Goram, Scottish footballer (Oldham Athletic, Rangers, national team), oesophageal cancer (b. 1964).
  - Brian Jackson, actor (Carry On Sergeant, Some Like It Cool, Revenge of the Pink Panther), cancer (b. 1931).
  - Anne Neville, engineer (b. 1970).
  - Susie Steiner, novelist and journalist (The Guardian), brain cancer (b. 1971).
- 3 July
  - Len Casey, English footballer (Plymouth Argyle, Chelsea) (b. 1931).
  - Dave Shearer, Scottish footballer (Middlesbrough, Gillingham) (b. 1958).
- 4 July
  - Alan Blaikley, English songwriter ("Have I the Right?", "The Legend of Xanadu", "I've Lost You") and composer (b. 1940).
  - Mona Hammond, Jamaican-born actress (EastEnders, Desmonds, Us Girls) (b. 1931).
  - Clive Middlemass, English footballer (Leeds United, Workington) and manager (Carlisle United) (b. 1944).
- 5 July – Manny Charlton, Scottish rock guitarist (Nazareth) (b. 1941).
- 8 July
  - Harry Mowbray, Scottish footballer (Blackpool, Bolton Wanderers, Cowdenbeath) (b. 1947).
  - Phil Walker, English footballer (Boavista, Millwall, Charlton Athletic) (b. 1954).
- 9 July
  - John Gwynne, darts commentator (Sky Sports), cancer (b. 1945).
  - Davie Robb, Scottish footballer (Aberdeen, national team) (b. 1947).
  - Adam Strachan, Scottish footballer (Partick Thistle, Ross County, Clyde) (b. 1987).
  - Barbara Thompson, English jazz saxophonist (Colosseum, Manfred Mann's Earth Band, Keef Hartley Band), complications from Parkinson's disease (b. 1944).
- 10 July
  - Ken Armstrong, English footballer (Kilmarnock, Southampton, Birmingham City) (b. 1959).
  - Andrew Ball, pianist (b. 1950).
  - Correlli Barnett, English military historian (b. 1927).
  - Michael Barratt, English television presenter (Nationwide) (b. 1928).
- 11 July – Monty Norman, English composer ("James Bond Theme") (b. 1928).
- 12 July
  - Michael Cowan, English cricketer (Yorkshire) (b. 1933).
  - Joan Lingard, Scottish author (The Kevin and Sadie series) (b. 1932).
  - Bramwell Tovey, conductor (Vancouver Symphony Orchestra, Rhode Island Philharmonic Orchestra) and composer (Eighteen), sarcoma (b. 1953).
- 13 July – Chris Stuart, journalist (Western Mail), producer (Only Connect), and songwriter (b. 1949).
- 15 July – Paul Ryder, English bassist (Happy Mondays) (b. 1964).
- 16 July – Ricky Bibey, English rugby league player (Wigan Warriors, Leigh Centurions, Wakefield Trinity) (b. 1981).
- 17 July – Enam Ali, Bangladeshi-born businessman, founder of The British Curry Awards and Spice Business Magazine, cancer (b. 1960).
- 19 July – Richard Seal, English organist and conductor (b. 1935).
- 20 July
  - Sir Kenneth Eaton, admiral, Controller of the Navy (1989–1994) (b. 1934).
  - Alan Grant, Scottish comic book writer (Judge Dredd, Lobo, Batman) (b. 1949).
  - Peter Inge, Baron Inge, military officer, Chief of the General Staff (1992–1994), Chief of the Defence Staff (1994–1997) and Constable of the Tower (1996–2001) (b. 1935).
  - Phil Jackson, English rugby league player (Barrow Raiders, Great Britain, national team) (b. 1932).
- 21 July – Paddy Hopkirk, Northern Irish rally driver (b. 1933).
- 22 July – David Moores, football executive, chairman of Liverpool (1991–2007) (b. 1946).
- 24 July
  - Diana Kennedy, food writer (The Cuisines of Mexico) (b. 1923).
  - Sam McCrory, Northern Irish loyalist (Ulster Defence Association) and convicted paramilitary, fall (b. 1965).
  - David Warner, English actor (Straw Dogs, Time Bandits, Titanic) (b. 1941).
  - Sir William Wright, Northern Irish bus manufacturer (Wrightbus) and politician, member of the constitutional convention (1975–1976) (b. 1927).
- 25 July
  - John Duggan, English rugby union (Wakefield) and league (Wakefield Trinity) player (b. 1929).
  - Martin How, English composer and organist (b. 1931).
  - Sandy Roberton, English record producer (Hark! The Village Wait, Please to See the King, Ten Man Mop, or Mr. Reservoir Butler Rides Again) (b. 1942).
  - David Trimble, Baron Trimble, Northern Irish politician, first minister (1998–2002), MP (1990–2005) and member of the House of Lords (since 2006), Nobel Prize laureate (1998) (b. 1944).
- 26 July – James Lovelock, English environmentalist (Gaia hypothesis), inventor of the electron capture detector, complications from a fall (b. 1919).
- 27 July
  - Bernard Cribbins, English actor (The Wombles, Doctor Who) and singer ("The Hole in the Ground") (b. 1928).
  - Sir Christopher Meyer, diplomat, Downing Street press secretary (1993–1996), Ambassador to the United States (1997–2003) and Ambassador to Germany (1997), stroke (b. 1944).
  - Tom Springfield, English musician (The Springfields) and songwriter ("I'll Never Find Another You", "Georgy Girl") (b. 1934).
- 28 July – Terry Neill, Northern Irish footballer (national team) and manager (Arsenal, Tottenham Hotspur) (b. 1942).
- 29 July
  - Myra Butter, English aristocrat (b. 1925).
  - Michael Redfern, actor (The Newcomers, United!, The Two Ronnies) (b. 1943).
- 31 July
  - Anneli Drummond-Hay, Scottish show jumper (b. 1937).
  - John Steiner, English actor (Hine, Violent Rome, Yor, the Hunter from the Future), traffic collision (b. 1941).

== August ==
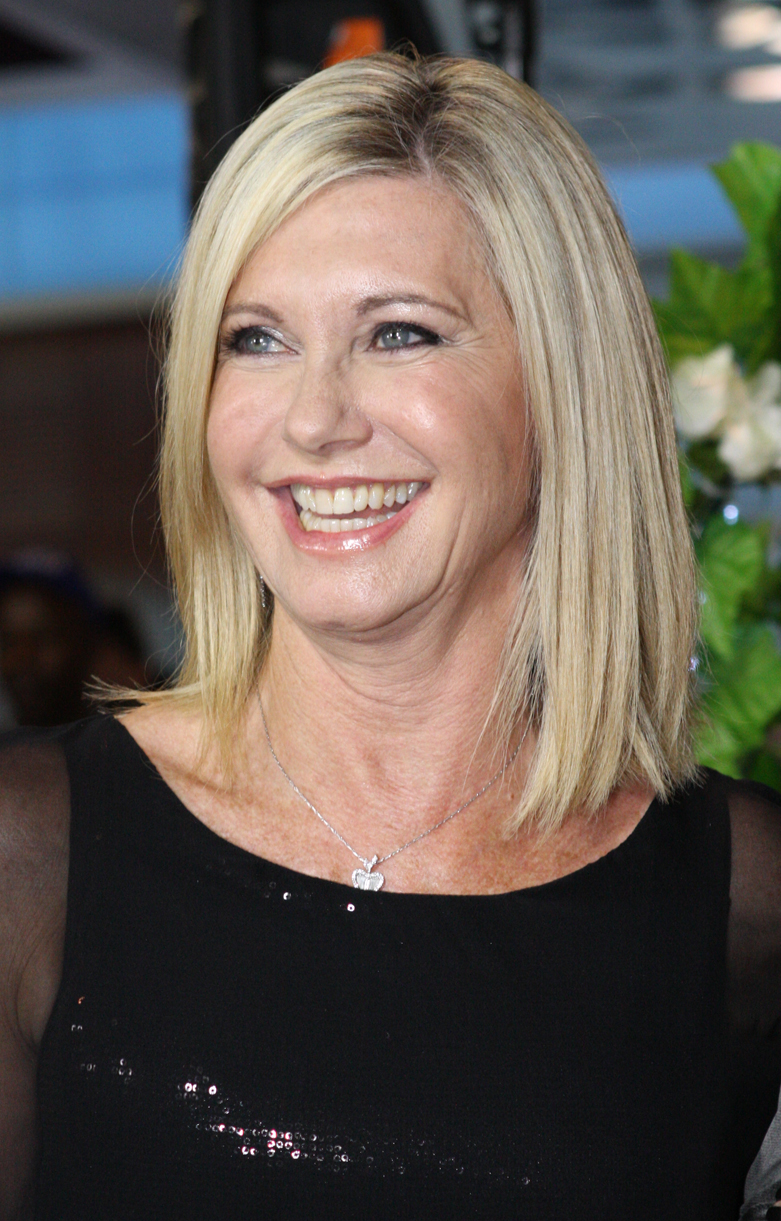
Olivia Newton-John in 2012

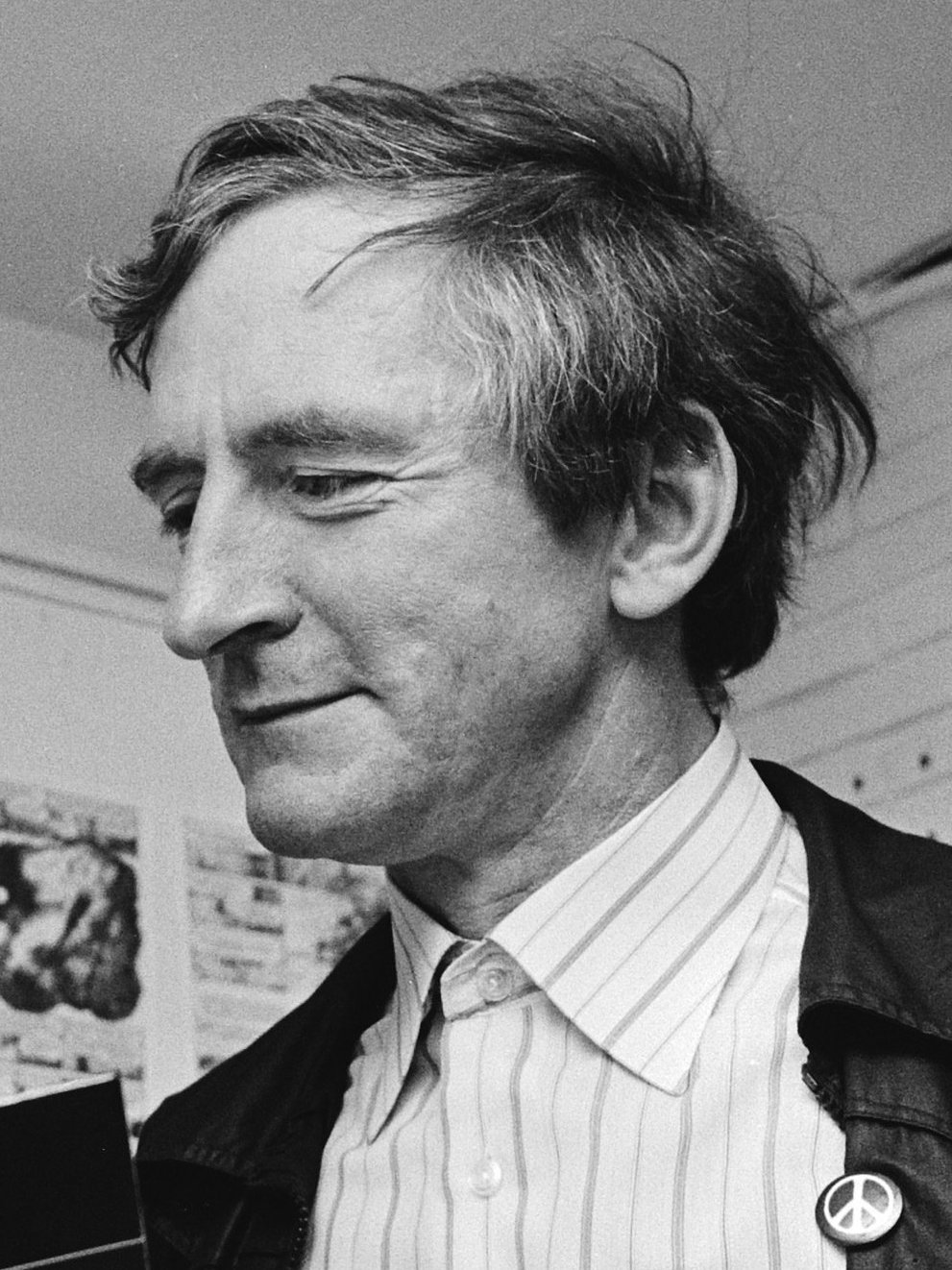
Raymond Briggs in 1983

- 1 August
  - John Hughes, Scottish footballer (Celtic, national team) and manager (Stranraer) (b. 1943).
  - Philip Purser, television critic and novelist (b. 1925).
- 2 August
  - Brenda Fisher, English long-distance swimmer (b. 1927).
  - Alastair Little, chef, cookbook author and restaurateur (b. 1950).
- 3 August
  - Roy Hackett, Jamaican-born civil rights activist (b. 1928).
  - Nicky Moore, English singer (Samson), Parkinson's disease (b. 1947).
- 5 August
  - Michael Howard, 21st Earl of Suffolk, peer, member of the House of Lords (1957–1999) (b. 1935).
  - Aled Owen, Welsh footballer (Tottenham Hotspur, Ipswich Town, Wrexham) (b. 1934).
- 8 August
  - Darryl Hunt, English musician (The Pogues) (b. 1950).
  - Dame Olivia Newton-John, British-Australian singer-songwriter ("I Honestly Love You", "Physical") actress (Grease), entrepreneur and activist, Grammy winner (1974, 1975, 1982), breast cancer (b. 1948).
- 9 August
  - Sir John Banham, businessman, director of the Confederation of British Industry (1987–1992) (b. 1940).
  - Raymond Briggs, English author, illustrator, cartoonist and graphic novelist (The Snowman, Father Christmas, Fungus the Bogeyman), pneumonia (b. 1934).
  - Kieran Denvir, Northern Irish Gaelic footballer (UCD GAA, Down GAA) (b. 1932).
  - Nicholas Evans, English journalist, novelist (The Horse Whispere), heart attack (b. 1950).
  - Mick Jones, English footballer (Notts County) and manager (Peterborough United, Plymouth Argyle) (b. 1947).
  - Jane McAdam Freud, conceptual sculptor (b. 1958).
- 10 August
  - Sir Ralph Halpern, fashion industry executive, founder of Topshop (b. 1938).
  - Pat Liney, Scottish footballer (Dundee, St Mirren, Bradford City) (b. 1936).
- 11 August
  - Sir Simon Bland, soldier and courtier (b. 1923).
  - Darius Campbell Danesh, Scottish singer-songwriter ("Colourblind", "Rushes", "Incredible (What I Meant to Say)") (b. 1980).
  - Arthur Goddard, British-Australian engineer (Rover Company) (b. 1921).
- 15 August
  - Mike Burrows, bicycle designer (b. 1943).
  - Steve Grimmett, English heavy metal singer (Grim Reaper, Onslaught, Lionsheart) (b. 1959).
  - Lenny Johnrose, English footballer (Bury, Blackburn Rovers, Burnley), complications from motor neurone disease (b. 1969).
- 16 August
  - Duggie Brown, English comedian and actor (Coronation Street, The Final Cut, Kes) (b. 1940).
  - Peter Davison, academic, authority on George Orwell (b. 1936).
  - Joseph Delaney, author (Spook's) (b. 1945).
  - Mark Girouard, architectural writer and historian (b. 1931).
  - Anthony Hunt, structural engineer (b. 1932).
  - Bruce Montague, English actor (Butterflies, The Link Men, Hollyoaks) (b. 1939).
  - Rico, Scottish singer-songwriter (b. 1971).
- 18 August – Josephine Tewson, actress (Keeping Up Appearances, Last of the Summer Wine, Gabrielle and the Doodleman) (b. 1931).
- 19 August
  - David Marsh, amateur golfer and football administrator, chairman of Everton F.C. (1991–1994) (b. 1934).
  - Leon Vitali, English actor (Barry Lyndon, Eyes Wide Shut, The Fenn Street Gang) (b. 1948).
- 21 August – David Armstrong, English footballer (Middlesbrough, Southampton, national team) (b. 1954).
- 22 August – David Douglas-Home, 15th Earl of Home, businessman and hereditary peer, member of the House of Lords (since 1996) (b. 1943).
- 23 August – David Shaw, politician, MP for Dover (1987–1997) (b. 1950).
- 24 August
  - Kallistos, English Orthodox prelate and theologian, metropolitan of Dioclea in Phrygia (since 2007) (b. 1934).
  - Tim Page, English photographer, liver cancer (b. 1944).
- 25 August
  - Ken Jones, Welsh rugby union player (Llanelli, Cardiff, national team) (b. 1941).
  - Giles Radice, politician, MP (1973–2001) and member of the House of Lords (2001–2022), cancer (b. 1936).
- 28 August – Sammy Chung, English footballer (Norwich City, Watford) and manager (Doncaster Rovers) (b. 1932).
- 29 August – Mick Bates, Welsh politician, AM (1999–2011), cancer (b. 1947).
- 31 August
  - Bill Turnbull, journalist and presenter, prostate cancer (b. 1956).
  - Charles Wilson, Scottish journalist and newspaper editor (The Times, The Independent) (b. 1935).

== September ==
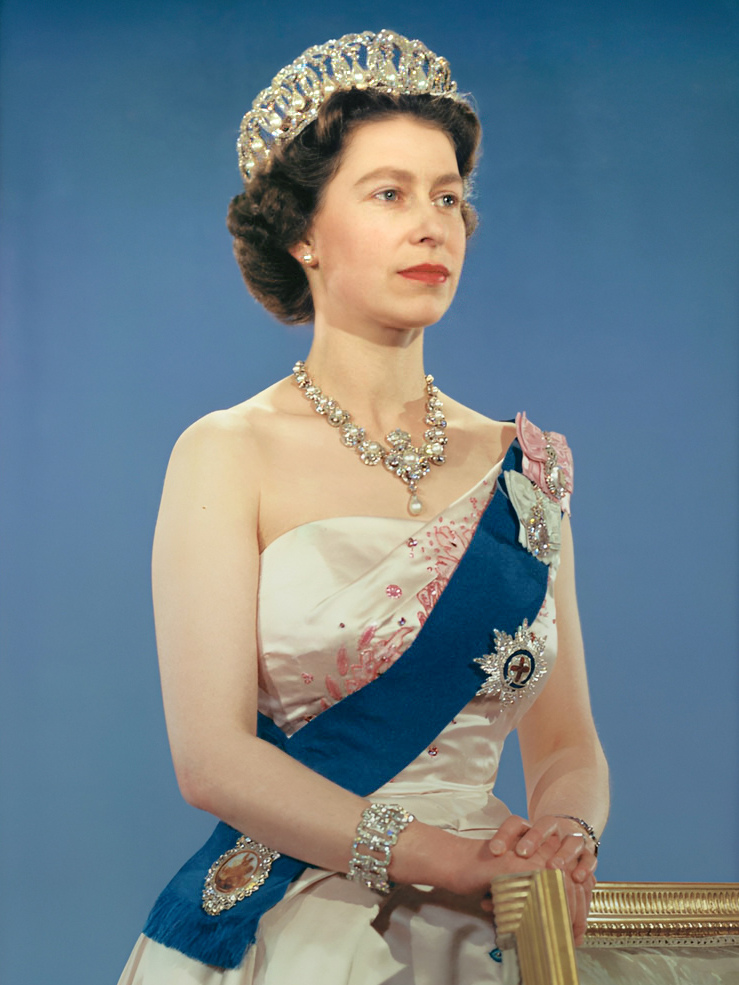
Elizabeth II in 1959

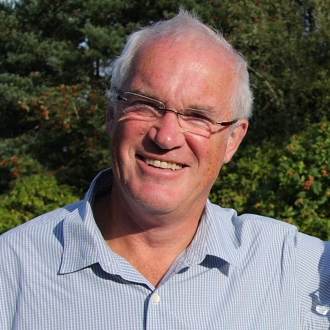
Eddie Butler in 2010

- 1 September – Phillip Mann, British-born New Zealand writer (Master of Paxwax, The Fall of the Families), teacher and theatre director (b. 1942).
- 2 September
  - Ian Cockbain, English cricketer (Lancashire) (b. 1958).
  - Drummie Zeb, English reggae musician (Aswad) and record producer (b. 1959).
- 5 September – Merlin Hanbury-Tracy, 7th Baron Sudeley, peer, member of the House of Lords (1960–1999) (b. 1939).
- 7 September – Alan Wilkins, Scottish playwright (b. 1969).
- 8 September
  - Elizabeth II, Queen of the United Kingdom (1952–2022) (b. 1926).
  - Mavis Nicholson, Welsh writer and broadcaster (b. 1930).
  - Gwyneth Powell, English actress (Grange Hill, Man Down, The Guardians), complications from colon surgery (b. 1946).
  - Dave Smith, Scottish footballer (Burnley, Brighton & Hove Albion) and manager (Plymouth Argyle) (b. 1933).
  - Luke Swann, English cricket coach (Northamptonshire) (b. 1983).
- 9 September – Clive Tanner, English-born Canadian politician, British Columbia MLA (1991–1996) (b. 1934).
- 11 September
  - Malcolm Erskine, 17th Earl of Buchan, Scottish peer, member of the House of Lords (1984–1999) (b. 1930).
  - Harry Landis, English actor (Bitter Victory, Friday Night Dinner, EastEnders) and stage director (b. 1926).
  - W. David McIntyre, English-born New Zealand historian (b. 1932).
  - Joyce Reynolds, classicist and academic (b. 1918).
- 12 September – Ken Brownlee, Scottish footballer (Aberdeen, Third Lanark, Boksburg), heart failure (b. 1934).
- 13 September
  - Fred Callaghan, English footballer (Fulham) and manager (Woking, Brentford) (b. 1944).
  - Brian Hewson, English Olympic middle-distance runner (1956, 1960) (b. 1933).
  - Tessa Keswick, policy analyst (b. 1942).
- 14 September – Paul Sartin, English folk singer, musician (Bellowhead, Faustus, Belshazzar's Feast) and composer, heart attack (b. 1971).
- 15 September
  - Eddie Butler, Welsh rugby union player (British & Irish Lions, Barbarian F.C., national team), commentator and journalist (b. 1957).
  - Liam Holden, Northern Irish victim of a miscarriage of justice (b. 1953).
- 18 September – Cherry Valentine, English nurse and drag queen (RuPaul's Drag Race UK, Cherry Valentine: Gypsy Queen and Proud) (b. 1993).
- 21 September
  - Jimmy Elder, Scottish professional footballer (Portsmouth, Colchester United) (b. 1928).
  - John Hamblin, English-born Australian television presenter (Play School) and actor (The Restless Years) (b. 1935).
  - Russell Weir, Scottish golfer (b. 1951).
- 22 September
  - Stu Allan, dance music DJ (Clock) and record producer, stomach cancer (b. 1962).
  - Dame Hilary Mantel, author (Wolf Hall, Bring Up the Bodies, The Mirror & the Light), Booker Prize winner (2009, 2012) (b. 1952).
  - Mohamed Sheikh, Baron Sheikh, Kenyan-born businessman and peer, member of the House of Lords (since 2006) (b. 1941).
- 25 September – Roy MacLaren, Scottish professional footballer (St Johnstone, Bury, Sheffield Wednesday). (b. 1930).

== October ==
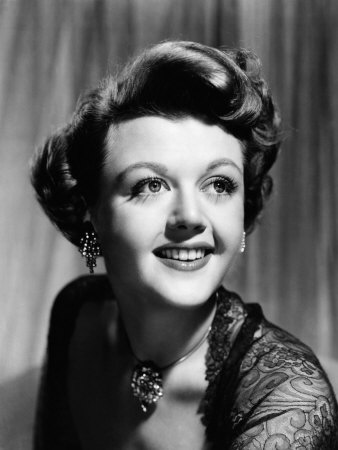
Dame Angela Lansbury in 1950

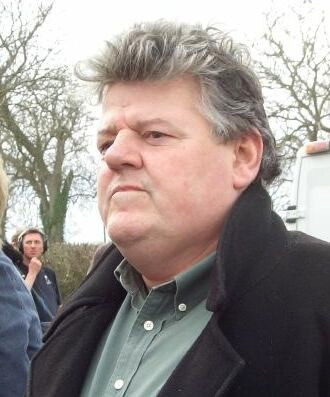
Robbie Coltrane in 2007

- 2 October
  - Raymond Allen, television screenwriter (Some Mothers Do 'Ave 'Em, Comedy Playhouse, The Little and Large Show) and playwright, cancer (b. 1940).
  - Eamonn McCabe, photographer (b. 1948).
  - Carl Walker, English police inspector, George Cross recipient (1972) (b. 1934).
- 3 October
  - Ian Hamilton, Scottish lawyer and independence activist (1950 removal of the Stone of Scone) (b. 1925).
  - Howard Tripp, Roman Catholic prelate, titular bishop of Newport and auxiliary bishop of Southwark (1980–2004) (b. 1927).
- 4 October
  - Peter Robinson, English-born Canadian crime writer (Inspector Alan Banks) (b. 1950).
  - Adam Walker, rugby league player (Hull Kingston Rovers, Wakefield Trinity, national team), suicide (b. 1991).
- 8 October
  - Gabrielle Beaumont, film and television director (Diana: A Tribute to the People's Princess) (b. 1942).
  - John Duncan, Scottish football player (Tottenham Hotspur, Derby County, Scunthorpe United, Dundee) and manager (Scunthorpe United, Hartlepool United, Chesterfield, Ipswich Town) (b. 1949).
- 9 October – Kevin Thomas, English footballer (Blackpool, Tranmere Rovers, Oxford United, Southport) (b. 1944).
- 10 October – Keith Eddy, English professional footballer (Barrow, Watford, Sheffield United) (b. 1944).
- 11 October – Dame Angela Lansbury, actress (The Manchurian Candidate, Bedknobs and Broomsticks, Murder, She Wrote), five-time Tony winner (b. 1925).
- 14 October – Robbie Coltrane, Scottish actor (Harry Potter, Cracker, GoldenEye) and comedian (b. 1950).
- 16 October – Ian Whittaker, set decorator (Alien), art director (Downhill Racer), and actor (The Revenge of Frankenstein) (b. 1928).
- 20 October
  - Josephine Melville, British actress, director and writer (EastEnders) (b. 1961).
  - Jimmy Millar, Scottish professional footballer (Dunfermline Athletic, Rangers, Dundee United, Scotland) and manager (Raith Rovers) (b. 1934).
- 21 October – May Blood, Baroness Blood, Northern Irish politician (b. 1938).

== November ==
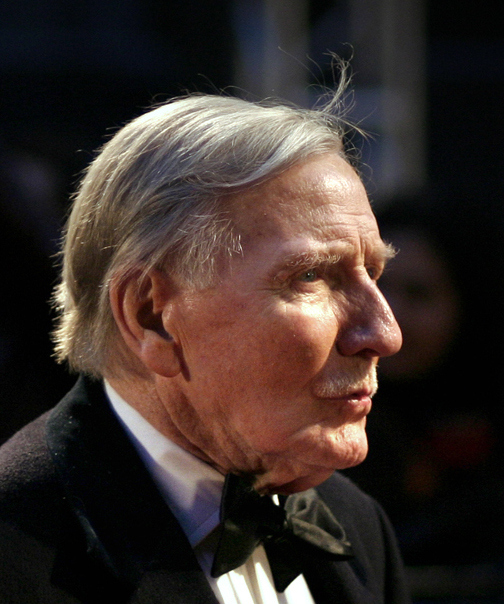
Leslie Phillips in 2007

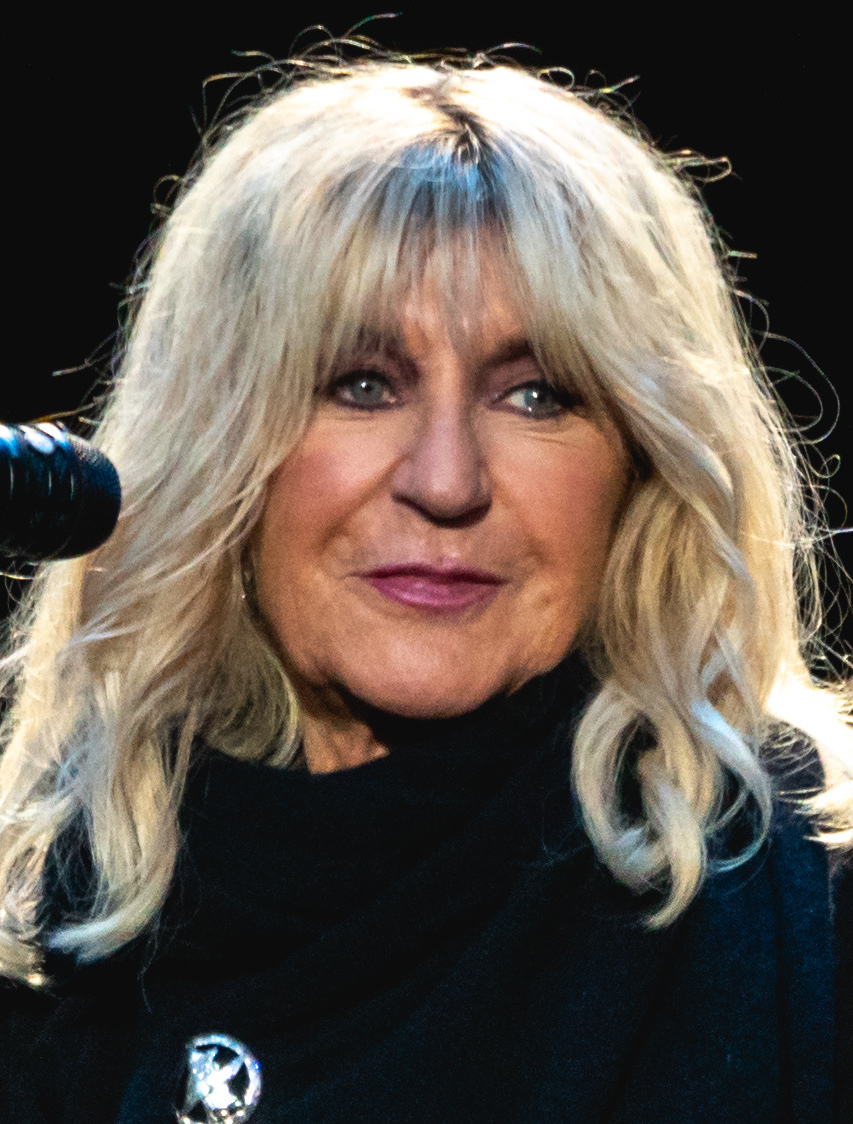
Christine McVie in 2019

- 1 November – Patricia Ruanne, English ballerina (b. 1945).
- 2 November
  - Nicholas Harding, English-born Australian painter, Archibald Prize winner (2001), cancer (b. 1956).
  - Ronnie Radford, English footballer (Newport County, Hereford United) (b. 1943).
  - Sir Erich Reich, Austrian-born entrepreneur and philanthropist (b. 1935).
- 3 November – Noel McKoy, soul singer.
- 5 November
  - Jeremy Davies, English Roman Catholic priest and exorcist, co-founder of the International Association of Exorcists (b. 1935).
  - Ian Ker, English Roman Catholic priest and scholar (b. 1942).
  - Bob Le Sueur, humanitarian (b. 1920).
  - Bill Treacher, English actor (EastEnders, The Musketeer, Dixon of Dock Green), COVID-19 and pneumonia (b. 1930).
- 6 November – Michael Boyce, Baron Boyce, naval officer, chief of the defence staff (2001–2003), first sea lord (1998–2001), and member of the House of Lords (since 2003), cancer (b. 1943).
- 7 November
  - Nigel Jones, Baron Jones of Cheltenham, politician, MP (1992–2005) and member of the House of Lords (since 2005), complications during surgery (b. 1948).
  - Tom Owen, English actor (Last of the Summer Wine) (b. 1949).
  - Leslie Phillips, English actor (Carry On, The Navy Lark, Harry Potter and the Philosopher's Stone) (b. 1924).
- 8 November
  - Sir David Butler, English political scientist (b. 1924).
  - Mario Conti, Scottish Roman Catholic prelate, bishop of Aberdeen (1977–2002) and archbishop of Glasgow (2002–2012) (b. 1934).
  - Sam Gardiner, Northern Irish politician, MLA (2003–2016) and three-time mayor of Craigavon (b. 1940).
  - Dan McCafferty, Scottish singer-songwriter, musician (Nazareth) (b. 1946).
  - Sir Evelyn de Rothschild, English financier, chairman of The Economist (1972–1989), stroke (b. 1931).
  - Tiutchev, English racehorse (b. 1993).
- 9 November – Michael Cross, Royal Air Force officer (b. 1942).
- 10 November
  - Peter Dawes, English Anglican prelate, bishop of Derby (1988–1995) (b. 1928).
  - Keith Farmer, Northern Irish motorcycle racer (b. 1987).
  - Rajni Kumar, English-born Indian educationalist, founder of the Springdales Schools (b. 1923).
  - Nik Turner, English musician, saxophonist and flautist (Hawkwind) (b. 1940).
- 11 November
  - Keith Levene, English guitarist, musician, founding member of (The Clash, Public Image Ltd), liver cancer (b. 1957).
  - Rab Noakes, Scottish singer-songwriter, musician (Stealers Wheel) (b. 1947).
  - Sir Simon Towneley, author, Lord Lieutenant of Lancashire (1976–1997) (b. 1921).
- 12 November
  - John Connaughton, English professional footballer (Manchester United, Sheffield United, Port Vale, Altrincham) (b. 1949).
  - David English, English actor (A Bridge Too Far, Lisztomania), cricketer (MCC) and writer, heart attack (b. 1946).
- 13 November
  - Colin Campbell, petroleum geologist (Rimini protocol) (b. 1931).
  - Willie Donald, Scottish cricketer (Aberdeenshire, national team) and administrator (b. 1953).
  - Sir Eldryd Parry, academic and physician (b. 1930).
- 14 November
  - Sue Baker, television presenter (Top Gear), motor neurone disease.
  - Kevin Beardmore, English rugby league player (Castleford, Great Britain, national team) (b. 1960).
- 15 November
  - Tim Holt, statistician, director of the Central Statistical Office (1995–1996) and the Office for National Statistics (1996–2000) (b. 1943).
  - Veronica Hurst, English actress (Laughter in Paradise, The Maze) (b. 1931).
  - Jimmy O'Rourke, Scottish footballer (Hibernian, St Johnstone, Motherwell) (b. 1946).
  - Marcus Sedgwick, novelist (Floodland, The Book of Dead Days, My Swordhand Is Singing) (b. 1968).
- 16 November
  - Christopher Duffy, military historian (b. 1936).
  - Peter J. Parsons, classical scholar (b. 1936).
  - Michael Pertschuk, English-born American commissioner of the Federal Trade Commission (1977–1984), pneumonia (b. 1933).
- 17 November – Nick Fisher, scriptwriter (The Giblet Boys), journalist and angler (River Cottage: Gone Fishing) (b. 1959). (body discovered on this date)
- 18 November – Francis Joseph, English footballer (Wimbledon, Brentford, Reading, Sheffield United, Gillingham, Crewe Alexandra, Fulham) (b. 1960).
- 20 November
  - Norrie Davidson, Scottish footballer (Aberdeen, Hearts, Dundee United, Partick Thistle, St Mirren) (b. 1934).
  - Sir Ian Grant, corporate director, chairman of Crown Estate (2002–2009) (b. 1943).
  - Frank Rankmore, Welsh professional footballer (Wales, Cardiff City, Peterborough United, Northampton Town) (b. 1939).
- 21 November
  - Wilko Johnson, English guitarist (Dr. Feelgood), songwriter ("Roxette"), and actor (Game of Thrones) (b. 1947).
  - Jeremy Lloyds, English cricketer (Somerset, Orange Free State, Gloucestershire) and umpire (b. 1954).
  - David Pownall, English playwright and radio dramatist (b. 1938).
- 22 November
  - Sir John Bourn, auditor, comptroller and auditor general (1988–2008) (b. 1934).
  - Dame Frances Campbell-Preston, courtier, lady-in-waiting to Queen Elizabeth The Queen Mother (1965–2002) (b. 1918).
  - Joe Hardstaff, English cricketer (Free Foresters, Combined Services, Marylebone) and air commodore (b. 1935).
  - Edward Kellett-Bowman, politician, MEP (1979–1984, 1988–1999) (b. 1931).
- 23 November
  - David Johnson, English professional footballer (England, Everton, Ipswich Town, Liverpool, Manchester City, Preston North End) (b. 1951).
  - Richard Shepherd, restaurateur (Langan's Brasserie) (b. 1945).
- 24 November
  - Chanoch Ehrentreu, German-born English rabbi (b. 1932).
  - Neil Robinson, English footballer (Everton, Swansea City, Grimsby Town, Darlington), cardiac arrest (b. 1957).
- 25 November – Sheila Vogel-Coupe, English prostitute (b. 1928).
- 26 November – Doddie Weir, Scottish rugby union player, complications from motor neurone disease (b. 1970).
- 27 November
  - Freddie Ross Hancock, publicist (b. 1930).
  - Brian Hogan, English rugby league player (St Helens, Wigan, national team) (b. 1947).
  - Dame Clare Marx, surgeon, president of the Royal College of Surgeons of England (2014–2017), pancreatic cancer (b. 1954).
  - Maurice Norman, English footballer (England, Norwich City, Tottenham Hotspur), cancer (b. 1934).
- 28 November
  - Sir Michael Knight, Royal Air Force officer (b. 1932).
  - Sir Michael Parker, army officer and event organiser (b. 1941).
  - Tom Phillips, English artist (A Humument) (b. 1937).
- 29 November
  - Derek Granger, English film and television producer, and screenwriter (Brideshead Revisited, A Handful of Dust, Where Angels Fear to Tread) (b. 1921).
  - Ouija Board, Thoroughbred racehorse (b. 2001).
- 30 November
  - Christine McVie, English singer, musician and keyboardist (Fleetwood Mac, Chicken Shack) (b. 1943).
  - Shirley Meredeen, journalist and activist (b. 1930).

== December ==
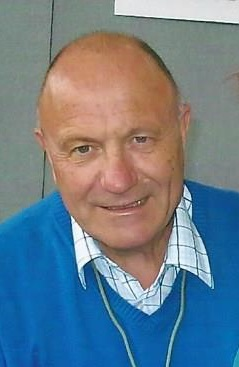
George Cohen in 2007

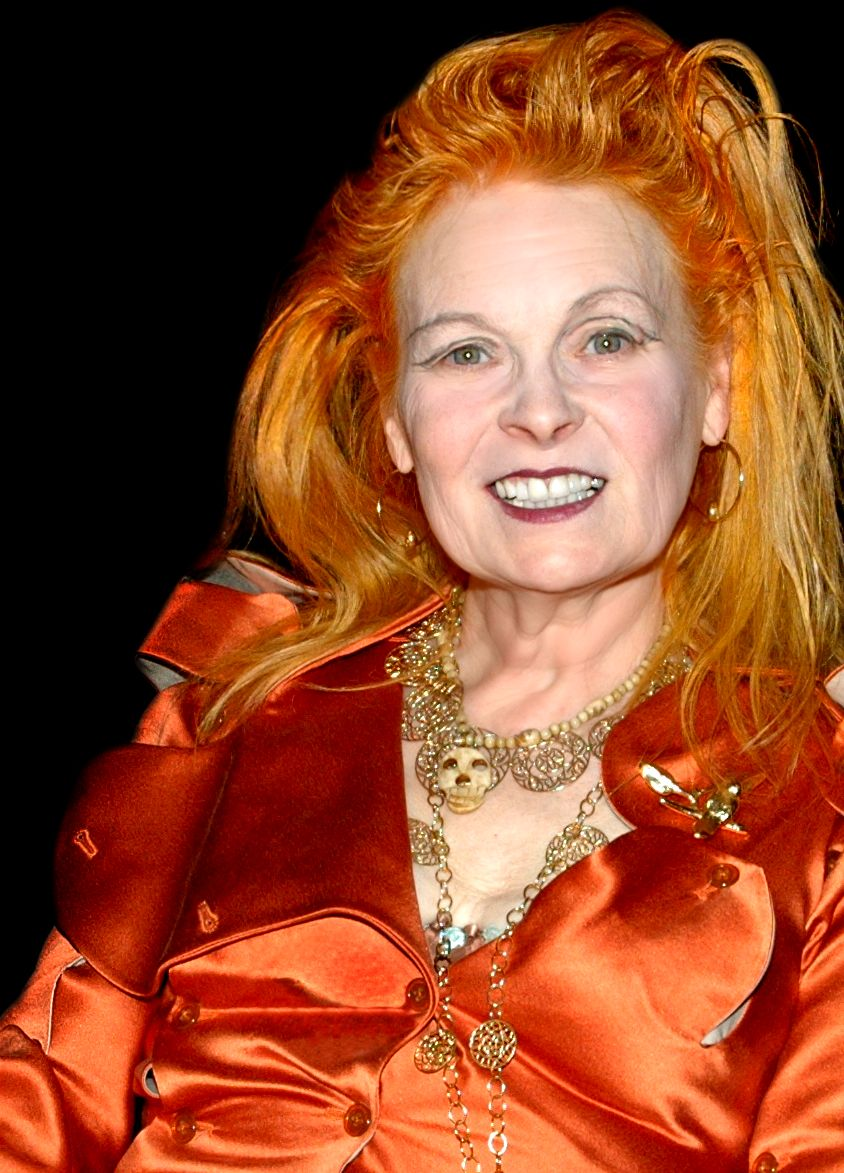
Dame Vivienne Westwood in 2008

- 2 December
  - Assem Allam, Egyptian-born football executive, chairman of Hull City (2010–2022), cancer (b. 1939).
  - Tony Allen, English footballer (Stoke City, Bury, national team) (b. 1939).
  - Carolyn Grace, Australian-born pilot, traffic collision.
  - Louis Negin, English-born Canadian actor (Get Charlie Tully, Rabid, Physical Evidence) (b. 1929).
  - Duncan Robinson, art historian and academic (b. 1943).
- 3 December
  - Jamie Freeman, singer and songwriter, brain cancer (b. 1965).
  - Leslie Houlden, Anglican priest and academic (b. 1929).
  - Annie Yellowe Palma, poet, author and child protection advocate (b. 1962).
- 4 December
  - Peter Hedger, racehorse trainer.
  - Jeffrey James West, Anglican priest and civil servant (b. 1950).
- 5 December – Anthea Millett, educator (b. 1941).
- 6 December
  - James Alty, computer scientist (b. 1939).
  - Jet Black, English drummer (The Stranglers) (b. 1938).
- 7 December
  - John Dodge, paediatrician (b. 1933).
  - Johnny Johnson, Royal Air Force officer (Operation Chastise) (b. 1921).
- 8 December – Kayf Tara, Thoroughbred racehorse (b. 1994).
- 9 December
  - Ruth Madoc, actress (Hi-de-Hi!, Fiddler on the Roof, Little Britain) and singer, complications from a fall (b. 1943).
  - David Young, Baron Young of Graffham, politician, secretary of state for trade and industry (1987–1989) and employment (1985–1987), member of the House of Lords (1984–2022) (b. 1932).
- 10 December
  - John Allen, rugby union player and administrator (Leicester Tigers) (b. 1942).
  - Dame Beryl Grey, English ballerina (b. 1927).
  - Tracy Hitchings, English musician (Landmarq), cancer (b. 1962).
  - Tony Lancaster, English-born American Bayesian econometrician (b. 1938).
  - Victor Lewis-Smith, writer and producer (In Confidence) (b. 1957).
  - John Molyneux, Trotskyist, academic and author (b. 1948).
- 11 December
  - Chris Boucher, television screenwriter (Doctor Who, Blake's 7, Shoestring) and novelist (b. 1943).
  - Mel James, Welsh rugby union rugby union (Swansea) and league (St Helens, national team) player (b. 1948).
- 12 December
  - Philippa Roe, Baroness Couttie, politician, leader of Westminster City Council (2012–2017) and member of the House of Lords (since 2016), cancer (b. 1962).
  - Michael Hodgetts, English Catholic historian (b. 1936).
  - Jacqueline Stanley, English-born painter (b. 1928).
- 13 December
  - Sir John MacDermott, Northern Irish jurist, judge of the high court (1973–1998) (b. 1927).
  - Bayan Northcott, English music critic (The Independent, BBC Music Magazine) and composer (b. 1940).
  - David Ramsbotham, Baron Ramsbotham, military officer and life peer, member of the House of Lords (since 2005), fall.
  - Adrian Shooter, transport executive, founder of Vivarail and member of the Royal Academy of Engineering, assisted suicide (b. 1948).
  - Kim Simmonds, Welsh rock singer and musician (Savoy Brown), colon cancer (b. 1947).
- 14 December
  - Alex Duchart, Scottish footballer (Southend United) (b. 1933).
  - Jean Franco, British-born American academic and literary critic (b. 1924).
  - John Hughes, Welsh-born American journalist (The Christian Science Monitor, Deseret News), Pulitzer Prize winner (1967) (b. 1930).
  - Sir Sydney Samuelson, cinematographer (b. 1925).
  - Christopher Tucker, English make-up artist (The Elephant Man, Quest for Fire, The Phantom of the Opera), strep infection (b. 1941).
- 15 December
  - Sulamita Aronovsky, Soviet-born classical pianist and teacher (b. 1929).
  - Veronica Linklater, Baroness Linklater of Butterstone, politician, member of the House of Lords (1997–2016), complications from Alzheimer's disease (b. 1943).
  - Belinda Douglas-Scott-Montagu, Baroness Montagu of Beaulieu, embroiderer (b. 1932).
  - Michael Reed, Canadian-born cinematographer (The Gorgon, On Her Majesty's Secret Service, Galileo) (b. 1929).
  - Barry West, English snooker player (b. 1958).
- 16 December
  - Doreen Brownstone, English-born Canadian actress (High Life, Foodland, Silent Night) (b. 1922).
  - Robin Ligus, English convicted serial killer (b. 1952).
  - Jane Sherwin, actress (Doctor Who, Blake's 7) (b. 1934).
- 17 December
  - Nicholas Herbert, 3rd Baron Hemingford, journalist (The Times, Cambridge Evening News), editor and peer, member of the House of Lords (1982–1999) (b. 1934).
  - Mike Hodges, screenwriter and director (Get Carter, Pulp, Flash Gordon), heart failure (b. 1932).
  - Archer Maclean, video game programmer (Dropzone, International Karate, Jimmy White's 'Whirlwind' Snooker) (b. 1962).
- 18 December
  - Martin Duffy, English keyboardist (Felt, Primal Scream), complications from a fall (b. 1967).
  - Thea Gregory, English actress (The Golden Link, The Weak and the Wicked, Satellite in the Sky) (b. 1926).
  - Terry Hall, English singer (The Specials, Fun Boy Three) and songwriter ("Our Lips Are Sealed") (b. 1959).
  - Gavin Hunter, racehorse trainer (b. 1941).
  - Gavin Weightman, journalist (New Society) and documentary filmmaker (b. 1945).
- 19 December
  - Ali Ahmed Aslam, Pakistani-born Scottish chef and restaurateur, credited with inventing chicken tikka masala, septic shock and organ failure (b. 1945).
  - Sandy Edmonds, English-born New Zealand pop singer (b. 1948).
  - Aonghas MacNeacail, Scottish Gaelic writer (b. 1942).
  - Graham Oakley, English children's author and illustrator (The Church Mice) (b. 1929).
  - Anthony Whetstone, naval admiral (b. 1927).
- 20 December
  - Sir Robert Gerken, naval admiral (b. 1932).
  - Brian Horlock, English Anglican priest, dean of Gibraltar (1989–1998) (b. 1931).
  - Brenda Swinbank, English archaeologist, complications of Alzheimer's disease (b. 1929).
- 21 December
  - Doug Baker, English rugby union player (Barbarian F.C., British & Irish Lions, national team) (b. 1929).
  - Roger Jenkins, theatre and television director (b. 1931).
  - Milan, Thoroughbred racehorse (b. 1998).
  - Simon Yaxley, radio broadcaster and actor (b. 1969).
- 22 December
  - Heidy Mader, physicist, cancer (b. 1961).
  - Ronan Vibert, English actor (b. 1964).
- 23 December
  - George Cohen, English footballer (Fulham, national team), world champion (1966) (b. 1939).
  - Cue Card, Thoroughbred racehorse, heart attack (b. 2006).
  - Stephen Greif, English actor (Blake's 7, The Crown) (b. 1944).
  - Maxi Jazz, English musician (Faithless) and songwriter ("Insomnia", "God Is a DJ") (b. 1957).
  - Claire McLintock, Scottish-born New Zealand haematologist and obstetric physician (b. 1965).
  - Christopher Needler, businessman, chairman of Hull City (1975–1997) (b. 1944).
  - Sir Ashok Jivraj Rabheru, Tanzanian-born businessman (b. 1952).
- 24 December
  - John Bird, English actor and comedian (Bremner, Bird and Fortune) (b. 1936).
  - John Eldridge, sociologist (b. 1936).
  - Royal Applause, Thoroughbred racehorse and sire (b. 1993).
  - Keith Sanderson, English footballer (Plymouth Argyle, Queens Park Rangers, Wimbledon), traffic collision (b. 1940).
  - Tom Stacey, novelist, publisher, and journalist, pneumonia (b. 1930).
- 25 December
  - Sir Michael Armitage, air force commander (b. 1930).
  - Brian Cassar, musician (b. 1936).
  - Abraham Levy, English Orthodox rabbi (b. 1939).
  - Alice Mahon, English trade unionist and former MP (b. 1937).
- 26 December
  - Ronald E. Asher, linguist and educator (b. 1926).
  - Tom Danby, English rugby union (Harlequins) and league player (Salford, national team) (b. 1926).
  - Christian Roberts, actor (To Sir, with Love, The Anniversary, The Mind of Mr. Soames), cancer (b. 1944).
- 27 December
  - Kenneth Bagshawe, oncologist (b. 1925).
  - Simon Clarke, English sociologist (b. 1946).
  - Brian Davies, Welsh animal welfare activist, founder of the International Fund for Animal Welfare (b. 1935).
  - Gerald Moore, English scholar (b. 1924).
- 28 December
  - Sir Leonard Allinson, civil servant and diplomat (b. 1926).
  - Derrick Knight, film director and producer (b. 1929).
  - Avrion Mitchison, zoologist and immunologist (b. 1928).
  - Valda Osborn, English Olympic figure skater (1952) (b. 1934).
  - Joan Sydney, English-born Australian actress (A Country Practice, E Street, Neighbours) (b. 1936).
- 29 December
  - John Burnett, English rugby league player (Halifax) (b. 1935).
  - John Jackson, English footballer (Crystal Palace, Leyton Orient, Millwall) (b. 1942).
  - Jackie Overfield, English footballer (Leeds United, Sunderland, Bradford City) (b. 1932).
  - Dame Vivienne Westwood, English fashion designer (b. 1941).
- 30 December
  - Graham Boal, judge and author, throat cancer (b. 1943).
  - Sir John Dellow, police officer (b. 1931).
  - Terence O'Brien, English-born New Zealand diplomat, ambassador to Belgium (1983–1986) (b. 1936).
- 31 December
  - Tom Karen, Austrian-born industrial designer (b. 1926).
  - Barry Lane, English golfer, cancer (b. 1960).
  - John Martin-Dye, English Olympic swimmer (1960, 1964), complications from Alzheimer's disease (b. 1940).
