= Paul Hudson =

English meteorologist and television weather presenter

- Born: Paul David Hudson; 27 February 1971 (age 55); Keighley, West Riding of Yorkshire, England
- Education: Newcastle University
- Occupations: Weather presenter and climate change correspondent
- Years active: 1997–present
- Employer(s): BBC Yorkshire; BBC Yorkshire and Lincolnshire
- Known for: Look North from Leeds; Look North from Hull

Paul David Hudson (born 27 February 1971) is an English weather presenter and environment correspondent for BBC Yorkshire and BBC Yorkshire and Lincolnshire. Hudson was born and raised in Keighley, West Yorkshire. He was made an Honorary Fellow of Bradford College in 2014.

After reading geophysics and planetary physics at Newcastle University, Hudson joined the Met Office and trained for two years at Leeds Weather Centre. Hudson combined this with a two-year stint as a weather presenter for BBC Look North and for the BBC local radio stations in Leeds, York, Humberside and Sheffield.

Hudson was known for his tongue-in-cheek banter with BBC Look North presenter Harry Gration, and also Peter Levy, presenter of BBC Look North for East Yorkshire, Lincolnshire, North West Norfolk and parts of Nottinghamshire via the Belmont transmitter.

== Early life ==
Hudson was born in Keighley, West Riding of Yorkshire. His parents, John and Margaret, purchased his first 'kids weather centre' when he was seven, and by the age of twelve he was compiling his own meteorological records (now archived by Keighley Library) and writing for local newspapers Keighley News and Telegraph & Argus. He went to the Brontë Middle School and Oakbank School on Oakworth Road in Keighley.

Hudson has a first-class degree in geophysics and planetary physics from the University of Newcastle. His early memories of local weather forecasting came from fellow Yorkshireman, Doncaster's Bob Rust.

Paul Hudson was present during the catastrophic fire at Valley parade in 1985.

Hudson attended training at the Meteorological Office College, situated at the former RAF Shinfield base in Shinfield, Berkshire. Due to a shortage of available posts within the Met Office, he worked as a geophysicist for an oil business in London.

== Career ==
After university and training at the Met Office College, Hudson worked for an oil business as a geophysicist until joining the Met Office as an international forecaster involving monsoons and typhoons.

=== Television ===
Hudson can be seen on the two editions of the regional news programmes Look North, from Leeds (serving North, West and South Yorkshire and the North Midlands), and Hull (serving East Yorkshire, Lincolnshire, north Norfolk and parts of Nottinghamshire).

Hudson returned to the BBC Yorkshire weather centre from the Met Office's old home of Bracknell in 1997 when Darren Bett left to present national forecasts.

In The Little Prince, Hudson voice-acted the English dubbing for The Great Inventor (during the Planet of Bubble Gob trilogy) and Ferdinand (Planet of the Globies).

=== BBC Climate change correspondent ===
Although most BBC forecasters are not directly employed by the BBC, but by the Department for Business, Innovation and Skills' Met Office (formerly the MOD's Met Office), since 2007 Hudson has been a full-time member of BBC staff, not the Meteorological Office, acting as an environmental and climate change expert. Hudson gives talks on the subject to local organisations and schools and has appeared on BBC One's Morning Show.

=== Radio ===
Hudson can also be heard on BBC Radio Leeds, BBC Radio Sheffield, BBC Radio York, BBC Radio Humberside, and BBC Radio Lincolnshire.

=== Wetwang public office ===
In May 2006, Hudson was elected honorary Mayor of Wetwang. This post was previously occupied by Richard Whiteley.

=== Cityzap ===
In December 2020, he became the voice of the new Transdev Coastliner Cityzap buses running the fast way along the M1 between Leeds and York.

== Personal life ==
Hudson was married to Nicola Shaw, a fellow BBC presenter, in 2003 having three children. He enjoys sea fishing, playing golf (he used to play at Riddlesden golf club, and now plays at Moor Allerton), cricket (he played for Ingrow St Johns in the Craven League). He supports Bradford City, having a twenty-five-year season ticket, and was trapped in the stand that caught fire in the Bradford City stadium fire of 1985.

== See also ==
- Weather forecasting
- Keeley Donovan
- Weather rock
