= List of BBC regional news programmes =

== Current programming ==
=== England regional news programmes ===
TV region	News programme	Headquarters
BBC London	BBC London	London
Channel Islands	BBC Channel Islands	St Helier
BBC East Midlands	BBC East Midlands Today	Nottingham
BBC East	BBC Look East	Norwich
BBC North West	BBC North West Tonight	Manchester
BBC North East and Cumbria	BBC Look North (North East and Cumbria)	Newcastle Upon Tyne
BBC South East	BBC South East Today	Royal Tunbridge Wells
BBC South	BBC South Today	Southampton
BBC South West	BBC Spotlight	Plymouth
BBC West Midlands	BBC Midlands Today	Birmingham
BBC West	BBC Points West	Bristol
BBC Yorkshire	BBC Look North (Leeds)	Leeds
BBC Yorkshire and Lincolnshire	BBC Look North (Hull)	Hull

=== UK nations news ===
Channel	News Programme	Headquarters
BBC One Scotland	BBC Reporting Scotland	Glasgow
BBC One Northern Ireland	BBC Newsline	Belfast
BBC One Wales	BBC Wales Today	Cardiff

=== UK nations news on other channels ===
Channel	News Programme	Headquarters	Notes
BBC Alba (Scotland)	An Là	Inverness	BBC Scotland and MG Alba
BBC Scotland	BBC Reporting Scotland: News at Seven	Glasgow	
S4C (Wales)	Newyddion	Cardiff	BBC Cymru Wales
BBC News (UK) / BBC One (overnight) / BBC Two	Across The UK	London	Used as break fillers when the international feed has ad breaks

=== International news ===
Channel	News Programme	Base	Notes
BBC News (International)	BBC News	London, Singapore and Washington DC	available worldwide.
BBC News (International North American feed) & PBS	BBC World News America	Washington DC	available via BBC News (International), PBS and BBC News (UK).
BBC News (International Africa feed) & PBS	Focus on Africa	Nairobi	available via BBC News (International), PBS and other partners in Africa.
BBC News (International East Asia)	Newsday	Singapore	available via BBC News (International) and BBC News (UK).
BBC Arabic	BBC News Arabic	London	available in the Middle East.
BBC Persian	BBC News Persia	London	available in Iran, Afghanistan, Uzbekistan and Tajikistan
BBC Swahili	Dira ya Dunia	Nairobi	
BBC News Ukrainian	BBC News Україна	London	
BBC Persian	BBC News Newshour	London	

== Former programming ==
Channel	News Programme	Notes
BBC South East	Newsroom South East	Consolidation of London and South East regions until 2001, with the separation of London and South East regions.

== See also ==
- BBC English Regions
