= Harry Gration =

English journalist and broadcaster (1950–2022)

Harry Gration MBE DL
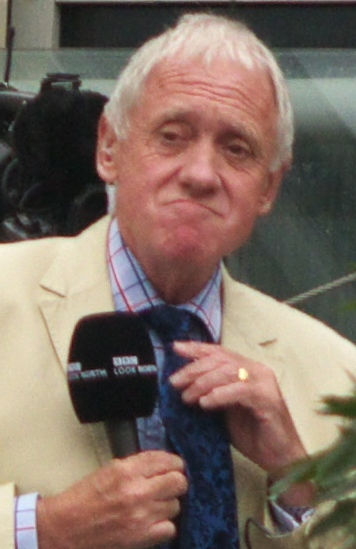
- Gration making final adjustments before going on air, 2012
- Born: Harry John Gration; 22 October 1950; Bradford, England
- Died: 24 June 2022 (aged 71)
- Years active: 1978-2022
- Known for: Television presenter, journalist
- Spouses: Hilary Gardner (m. 1974, divorced); Rowena Cluness (m. 1984, divorced); Helen Chene (m. 2001)
- Children: 6

Harry John Gration MBE DL (22 October 1950 – 24 June 2022) was an English journalist and broadcaster. He was one of the main anchors for the BBC Yorkshire regional magazine programme Look North. He was often referred to as Mr. Yorkshire by the media.

== Early life ==
Born in Bradford, West Riding of Yorkshire, to Nina (née Smith) and Morris Gration, Gration was raised in a back-to-back house in the city. His father was a chemist who was a manager at a Boots store in the city and promotion took the family first to Leeds, then York. Gration was educated at Leeds Grammar School and at St Peter's School in York, and after leaving education, he initially spent five years as a history teacher and eventually, a head of history at The Rodillian Academy, a school in Lofthouse, near Leeds.

== Career ==
Whilst still teaching, Gration became a sports commentator on rugby league games which led to a three-month contract with the BBC. He then ended up resigning from his teaching post and went into broadcasting full-time when he joined BBC Radio Leeds in 1978.

Gration started presenting Look North in 1982. By 2018, Gration had been broadcasting with the BBC for 40 years, although he had a spell at BBC South Today where he co-presented with Sally Taylor between 1995 and 1999. He presented alongside Judith Stamper, Clare Frisby, Christa Ackroyd, and his last co-anchor was Amy Garcia.

He appeared on Top Gear in 2010. While supposedly reporting from Braithwell, Jeremy Clarkson crashes a Reliant Robin in the background.

Gration was appointed Member of the Order of the British Empire (MBE) in the 2013 Birthday Honours for services to broadcasting.

Gration regularly appeared in the annual Christmas pantomime at the York Theatre Royal in a filmed segment with its main star and writer, Berwick Kaler. In the 2016 production of Cinderella, Gration appeared in women's underwear.

On 13 October 2020, Gration announced his retirement from the BBC. His final appearance as lead presenter on Look North was 21 October 2020, the day before his 70th birthday.

== Public office ==
In December 2009, Gration followed in the footsteps of his Look North colleague and Mayor of Wetwang, Paul Hudson, when he was declared honorary Mayor of Burn. In June 2018, Gration performed the wedding ceremony between Keeley Donovan and Johnny I'Anson in Knaresborough; Donovan is a Look North weather presenter and reporter and I'Anson also broadcasts for the BBC.

He was a Deputy Lieutenant of North Yorkshire.

== Personal life ==
Gration was married three times and had six children. His first two marriages, to Hilary Gardner (m.1974) and Rowena Cluness (m.1984), ended in divorce. He married his third wife, Helen Chene, in 2001. Gration died suddenly after collapsing on 24 June 2022 at the age of 71. It was later revealed that he was diagnosed with cancer, but this was unrelated to his death.

A memorial service was held for Gration on 1 August 2022, which is Yorkshire Day, at York Minster. It was attended by Geoff Boycott, Dickie Bird and former Archbishop of York Dr John Sentamu.
