= Sarah Cruddas =

British journalist and presenter

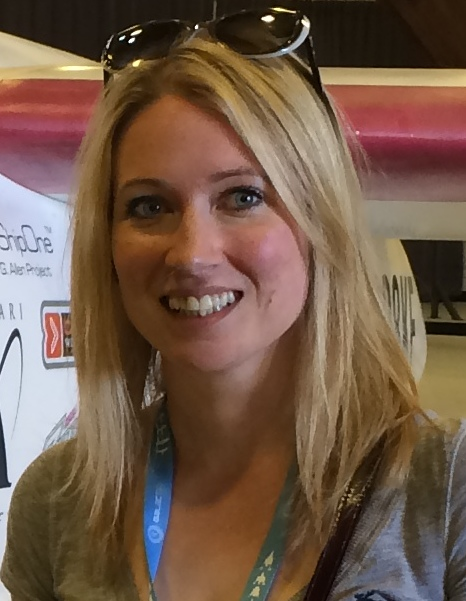
- Cruddas in October 2014
- Born: Sarah Jane Cruddas; Wales
- Citizenship: British, United States
- Education: University of Leicester
- Occupations: Television presenter, space journalist, author
- Website: www.sarahcruddas.com

Sarah Jane Cruddas is a Los Angeles-based television presenter, space journalist, author and popular science communicator She is an investigator on the television series Contact on Discovery Channel and Science Channel as well as appearing on other shows on the channels. She is also the co-host of UFO Conspiracies with Craig Charles on History Channel in the UK. She has an academic background in astrophysics and is the author of several books about space exploration.

== Early life ==
Cruddas was born in Wales. She grew up in the East Riding of Yorkshire, attending South Hunsley School and Wyke College in Hull, where she gained A-levels in Maths, Further Maths, Physics and Chemistry. As a student she won the Young Scientist 2000 Awards and attended NASA's International Space Camp. She has a BSc in physics with Astrophysics from the University of Leicester, and a Post Graduate Diploma in Broadcast Journalism from the University of Westminster.

== Career ==
After graduating, Cruddas started her career as a broadcast journalist and reporter with the BBC, working for BBC CWR, BBC Hereford & Worcester and BBC Radio 1Xtra. She also presented news bulletins on Talksport. In July 2008 Cruddas began working on screen as a weather presenter for the BBC's Look North programme. She would also present and report on local radio including BBC Radio Humberside, BBC Lincolnshire, BBC Radio Leeds, BBC Radio Sheffield and BBC Radio York Whilst working at Look North she also spent time developing national science shows for BBC 4 and BBC 2 and working as a science reporter for Look North and BBC Radio 5 Live. In July 2011 she worked at NASA as a reporter covering the final Space Shuttle launch and landing for BBC radio.

In November 2011, she left Look North to work as a Science Correspondent with the BBC based in Salford. Cruddas also reported for the BBC News Channel and appeared on screen as an expert on Coast and Newsround as well as presenting science shows for BBC Learning. In July 2012 Cruddas left the BBC. From 2012 to 2019 she worked as a space journalist and television presenter in the UK, becoming the popular voice of space on British TV, most notably on Sky News, Channel 5 News and ITV. She has also continued to work with the BBC as a reporter for the BBC News and Horizons Business on BBC World and has presented shows about space exploration on BBC Radio 4, BBC GNS and BBC World Service.

Cruddas started working in the US in the mid-2010s becoming a popular and influcial figure in the space industry. As well as regularly appearing in documentaries broadcast on the Discovery Channel. Since 2019 Cruddas has been an investigator on the television series 'Contact' on Discovery Channel and Science Channel.

Cruddas has written for The Sunday Times, New Scientist, BBC Futures, BBC Sky at Night magazine, BBC On-line, BBC Focus, Grazia magazine and The Royal Aeronautical Society. Cruddas is the author of three children's books published by Dorling Kindersley: DK Find Out!: Solar System, Do You Know About Space? and The Space Race. The third become the first British children's book to travel to the edge of space after Cruddas launched the book using a balloon from the countryside near Sheffield, South Yorkshire. She released her first adults title - Look Up: Our story with the stars in September 2020. Published by HarperCollins, the book features a foreword by Apollo 11 astronaut Michael Collins.

Cruddas later partnered with Assouline Publishing releasing Moon Paradise in 2022.

Cruddas sits on the board of directors of Space For Humanity a US non-profit dedicated to democratising access to space.

== Personal life ==
Cruddas got her Green Card approved in September 2021, and is resident in the US as of 2021.

Away from space, she has reported from across the world including; Australia, the Arctic, China, North Korea and Tibet.
