= BBC Night Network =

Network of BBC Local Radio stations in the north of England

The BBC Night Network (sometimes referred to on-air as BBC North FM and originally Radio North East) was an all-evening radio network which linked up the North East England, Yorkshire and the Humber, and later the North West England regions of BBC Local Radio. Each station would share the same programming.

== Pre-history ==
In 1984 a Saturday evening, 45-minute programme consisting of organ music, At the Console, began broadcasting. It was aired during the winter sports period at 6:45 pm on BBC Radios Leeds, York and Humberside. In August 1986, networked specialist music programming in Yorkshire was expanded into a weeknight service which was broadcast on all four Yorkshire stations (Leeds, York, Sheffield and Humberside) and aired from 6:05 pm to 7:30 pm. A year later this was further extended to a nightly service (apart from on Tuesdays to allow for local sports coverage) and the programmes were extended to two hours, broadcasting from 7:05 pm to 9:00 pm.

== History ==
The BBC Night Network was launched on 29 May 1989 in the then BBC North and BBC North East regions – broadcast nightly on BBC Radio Newcastle, BBC Radio Cleveland, BBC Radio York, BBC Radio Leeds, BBC Radio Humberside and BBC Radio Sheffield between 6:05 pm (6 pm at the weekend) and midnight. Any local programming broadcast after 6 pm, such as sport and ethnic minority output, was transmitted only on that station's medium wave frequencies, with Night Network output broadcasting on FM. Weeknight programming consisted of two three-hour shows, the second of which was presented by Martin Kelner. The programme included comedy sketches from Caroline Aherne in which she portrayed the Mrs Merton character and partook in ad-libbed conversations with Kelner. Regional news updates were broadcast on the hour. Weekend programming consisted of specialist music shows, and there were no news bulletins at the weekend.

The network was expanded in May 1991 to include the four BBC North West stations – BBC GMR, BBC Radio Merseyside, BBC Radio Lancashire and BBC Radio Cumbria. These stations had previously run their own Network North West simulcast service since October 1988. The Night Network now broadcast from 7:05 pm until midnight. Programming was overhauled with specialist music programmes airing from 7:05 pm to 10 pm (the exception being made for midweek sports coverage) followed, on weeknights, by a late show from Lancaster, presented by Bob Roberts. The late show was extended to 12:30 am a year later and eventually to 1 am. Local programming would now fully opt-out of the network with any local evening programming replacing the scheduled Night Network programme on both FM and AM.

Following Bob Roberts' departure, the 10 pm to 1 am slot was taken over by a talk show called Late Night North, presented initially by Mike Parr from the Newcastle studios, followed in 1997 by David Dunning and latterly by Alex Trelinski. The programme, developed by Radio Newcastle editor Tony Fish, included a mix of interviews and phone-ins and occasionally broadcast from other BBC Local Radio stations. The show later moved to Manchester and took on a more music-reliant format when it was presented by Andy Peebles. In 2002, Yorkshire stations left the network to introduce a regional phone-in show with Alex Hall, who had hosted a similar show on Pulse.

== News ==
Initially, a single news update was broadcast across the entire network on the hour. However, regional bulletins were introduced when the North West stations joined the Night Network. Three separate bulletins were broadcast, lasting exactly five minutes, each weeknight - one for Yorkshire and Humberside, one for the North East and Cumbria and one for the North West. Charles Lees read the news in the Yorkshire and Lincolnshire area (BBC North) and Sharon Barbour read the news for the North East and Cumbria.

== Jingles ==
BBC Night Network's jingles were produced by TM Century, now TM Studios. The original package was just for Yorkshire and the North East, while a second package was produced for the rest of the network.

== Current simulcast arrangements ==
Since the Night Network arrangement was abandoned, the stations involved have taken steps to produce more locally produced programming and in some cases, extend broadcasting hours.

- BBC Yorkshire: BBC Radio Leeds, BBC Radio York and BBC Radio Sheffield simulcast late-night shows every night. Radio York also carries some programming from the BBC North East and Cumbria region.
- BBC Yorkshire and Lincolnshire: Both BBC Radio Humberside and BBC Radio Lincolnshire carry regional output from BBC Yorkshire. Radio Lincolnshire also carries some weekend programming from the neighbouring BBC East Midlands and BBC East regions.
- BBC North East and Cumbria: BBC Radio Newcastle and BBC Radio Tees simulcast late night and weekend evening output with BBC Radio Cumbria and BBC Radio Tees also simulcasting Braithwaite's Country on Sunday evenings.
- BBC North West: Indus is broadcast on BBC Radio Manchester and BBC Radio Lancashire on Sunday evenings and both stations broadcast the Allan Beswick phone-in from 10 pm to 1 am each Monday to Thursday night from MediaCityUK in Salford Quays.

== Notable presenters ==
- Alex Hall
- Martin Kelner
- Bob Preedy

== See also ==
- The Superstation – former night time service on most UK commercial radio stations
- Night Network – night time service by the ITV network
