= Keeley Donovan =

British journalist and broadcaster

- Born: Keeley Emma Donovan; 14 May 1983 (age 43); Grimsby, Humberside, England
- Education: De Montfort University
- Occupations: Meteorologist; journalist; weather presenter
- Years active: 2005–present
- Employer: BBC
- Known for: Look North (Hull); Look North (Leeds)
- Television: Break-in Britain; Countryfile Diaries; Inside Out
- Spouse: Johnny I'Anson (m. 2018)
- Children: 1
- Father: Terry Donovan
- Relatives: Don Donovan (grandfather)

Keeley Emma Donovan (born 14 May 1983) is an English journalist and broadcaster, working for the BBC as a weather presenter for television and radio stations in the North of England.

== Early life ==
Donovan was born in Grimsby, Humberside, now North-East Lincolnshire, and grew up in nearby Tetney. Her father, Terry Donovan, was a professional footballer, as was her Irish grandfather, Don Donovan.

She attended the Humberston School. She took a course in media at Franklin Sixth Form College in Grimsby, then studied for a BA at De Montfort University in Leicester. She returned to Grimsby to do a post-graduate NVQ Diploma in Broadcast Journalism at Grimsby Institute of Further & Higher Education in conjunction with East Coast Media.

== Career ==
Donovan started her broadcasting career at the age of 14, presenting for Channel 7 Television (now Estuary TV), a local cable TV station based in Immingham. She went freelance while continuing her studies and began freelancing for BBC Yorkshire and Lincolnshire in 2005 and joined the locally based Propeller TV a year later.

After studying broadcast meteorology with the Met Office and the BBC Weather Centre, Donovan started presenting weather forecasts for the BBC's regional TV and local radio services in the Yorkshire and North Midlands, East Yorkshire and Lincolnshire and North East and Cumbria regions. She is also a reporter for the regional current affairs magazine, Inside Out, and an occasional newsreader and reporter for the Leeds edition of BBC Look North.

In September 2014, Donovan joined BBC Radio Humberside, presenting the new Saturday morning show. She had participated in work experience at the radio station 15 years earlier.

In September 2015, she co-presented her first networked TV series, the daytime factual show Break-in Britain, produced by BBC Cymru Wales.

In March 2016, it was announced that Donovan would co-present the new BBC series Countryfile Diaries, a spin off of the Countryfile programme.

In August 2017, Donovan was named as the new presenter of the Yorkshire and Lincolnshire variation of the BBC's Inside Out; she was previously a reporter for the series.

== Personal life ==
In July 2017, Donovan announced her engagement to fellow BBC presenter Johnny I'Anson. He proposed to Donovan during a romantic walk in the Lake District. They were married on 25 June 2018 in a rustic wedding at Castle Farm near Knaresborough. BBC Look North colleague Harry Gration conducted the ceremony.

Their daughter was born in 2020. They live in Leeds. In January 2023, Donovan revealed that she had suffered a miscarriage.
