= Amy Garcia =

English journalist and broadcaster

- Born: Amy Garcia; 24 May 1981 (age 44); Wakefield, Yorkshire, England
- Known for: Television presenter, journalist
- Spouse: Tim (m. 2010)
- Children: 2

Amy Garcia (born 24 May 1981) is an English journalist and broadcaster. Since 2020, she has been the main anchor of the BBC Yorkshire regional magazine programme Look North.

== Early life ==
Garcia was born in Wakefield; her mother is English and her father is Spanish. She attended Kettlethorpe High School and Wakefield College. She also studied at the National Youth Music Theatre.

== Career ==
Garcia moved to London aged 19, working on interactive TV services Chase-It.TV and ITV Play's Play DJ. She also worked on programmes for CBBC, CITV, and The Disney Channel.

Garcia joined BBC Look North as a broadcast journalist in 2009, then moving to BBC South Today in 2012. During this time, she was also a newsreader for 60 Seconds on BBC Three, before moving back to Yorkshire and re-joining BBC Look North, but as a presenter, replacing the then newly-dismissed Christa Ackroyd. She co-presented with Harry Gration until his retirement in 2020.

== Personal life ==
Garcia married her husband Tim in 2010. They have two children, and currently reside in York.
