= Hannah Moffat =

British journalist

Hannah Wise
- Born: 1978 (age 47–48); Birmingham, England
- Occupation: News presenter
- Television: France 24 News, BBC Look North
- Children: 2
- Website: Presenter Profile

Hannah Wise is a British television journalist who has worked as a news anchor on the former English-language Swiss news channel CNNMoney Switzerland. Prior to this she was a presenter for France 24, and before that was one of the main anchors of the BBC regional news programme Look North.

== Early life ==
Moffat was born in Birmingham, England but grew up in Murieston near Livingston, Scotland. Moffat studied Physical Geography at the University of Aberdeen.

== Career ==
=== Met Office ===
After university, she went for a job with the Met Office. It was to be an office assistant at the BBC Weather Centre. From June 2001 she covered for regional weather presenters when they were ill or on leave.

=== Look North ===
Moffat joined the Look North team in July 2004 and despite growing up in Scotland, happily settled herself in Lincolnshire.

She started her career as a weather forecaster, covering behind Paul Hudson and Lisa Gallagher in 2001. And after two years of journalism and reporting skills in London and the South East on South East Today she jumped at the chance to come back up North to join the Look North team as their breakfast presenter.

Since then Moffat has been seen reporting from across Lincolnshire, and has recently bought her own home in the county "I really feel connected to Lincolnshire, the people are so friendly and welcoming". She regularly presents Look North's live broadcasts and admits to particularly enjoying the Lincoln Christmas Market and Lincolnshire Show which she attends every year.

Look North was broadcast across the whole of the Yorkshire and Lincolnshire region at the time Moffat started to work on it. Moffat became the regular breakfast and lunchtime weather presenter of the programme. When the BBC split the region into two when Moffat was honing her journalism and reporting skills in London and the South East so she re-joined Look North in 2005 to present the bulletins during BBC Breakfast from Hull.

Moffat left Look North on Friday, 24 July 2009 to take up a new position on France24.
