= Simon Clark (broadcaster) =

British television sports presenter and correspondent (born 1960)

- Born: 20 August 1960 (age 65); United Kingdom
- Occupation: television sports presenter
- Known for: Look North

Simon Clark (born 20 August 1960) is a British television sports presenter and correspondent primarily on the television programme, Look North.

Before 2002, he worked for the BBC in Leeds and as the sports presenter for BBC Radio Sheffield. He worked there from 1991 to 1997. He also broadcast at Radio Hallam FM from 1988 to 1991 having started his career in the late 1970s at Kingstown Radio. before moving onto Viking Radio in Hull when it launched in 1984.

In 1994, he had his first daughter shortly followed by the second in 1998.

In 2006, he hosted a pre-match event before every FIFA World Cup game involving England, at the BBC Big Screen in Hull. His reports can occasionally be heard on Final Score, BBC One's football results programme, during the football season.

He reported from the 2009 Barclays Asia Trophy in Beijing where Tottenham Hotspur beat Hull City 3–0 in the final.

In the lead up to the 2012 Olympic Games in London, Simon Clark has been reporting on the athletes, torch relay and occasions related to the event in Yorkshire and Lincolnshire. He also worked on BBC School Report from the organisation's base in Salford.

Simon Clark began his working life in business, where he ran a successful travel agency before moving into the world of media.

He lists travel as one of his passions. That list also includes refereeing in the Hull Boys Sunday Football League when not reporting for BBC Look North.
