= Helen Fospero =

English television presenter and journalist

- Born: Helen Jane Morton; 30 August 1966 (age 59); Cleethorpes, Lincolnshire, England
- Occupations: Newsreader, television and radio presenter
- Agent: Seamus Lyte
- Notable credit(s): GMTV; Lorraine; Daybreak; The One Show; Watchdog
- Spouse: Carl Fospero (m. 2003)
- Children: Francesca (b. 2004); Jack (b. 2009)

Helen Fospero (née Morton; born 30 August 1966) is an English television presenter and journalist, best known for her presenting roles on shows such as GMTV, Daybreak, and Lorraine.

She is currently working as a reporter for Watchdog and The One Show on the BBC.

== Early life ==
Born Helen Jane Morton in Cleethorpes, Lincolnshire, she grew up in nearby Grimsby, and attended Hereford School (now Ormiston Maritime Academy), Grimsby. Her grandfather George Barker, was one of the Grimsby Chums during the First World War.

She left school just before her 18th birthday and started her career at the local weekly newspaper. A short time later she joined a national news agency, writing for tabloids and broadsheets in Fleet Street.

== Career ==
Fospero's television career began when she was one of the first journalists to be recruited by Sky Television in 1989. She was a home news editor when the channel launched in 1989, and took on many roles in her nine years there, including reporter and presenter on Sunrise and Live at Five. In September 1997, she was poached by Breakfast television station GMTV, where she met John Stapleton, who acted as a mentor to her. Fospero was initially the Showbiz correspondent, then later became the United States correspondent, based in New York City.

In November 2002, when the BBC launched the new Yorkshire & Lincolnshire area, Fospero was appointed by Greg Dyke to front the new version of regional news magazine programme Look North along with Peter Levy.

After her daughter was born, Fospero left Look North to find a position based in London to be closer to her family, and after standing in on BBC London News, she joined Channel 5 News and Sky News. Fospero gave birth to her second child in mid-2009, after which she became a freelance presenter.

In September 2009, Fospero made her return to GMTV as a newsreader for the first hour of GMTV (News Hour), as well as a relief presenter alongside John Stapleton. In 2010, Fospero shared presenting and newsreading duties with Penny Smith until her departure on 4 June 2010. This is when she became the main newsreader on GMTV and GMTV with Lorraine, as well as the main relief presenter, until the demise of GMTV on 3 September 2010.

Since then she has gone on to present other breakfast programmes for ITV. On 18 June 2011, she guest presented ITV Breakfast programme Lorraine for the first time in place of Fiona Phillips, and has since made regular appearances as the show's stand-in host on Friday mornings and school holidays.

Whilst presenting Lorraine, ITV Breakfast also gave Fospero the opportunity to present its sister show Daybreak as a stand-in presenter. One of Fospero's best roles for Daybreak was in 2012 when she interviewed Elton John at his home in Nice, France, this was Fospero's one and only outside interview that she has done for Daybreak, this interview was broadcast on 20 July 2012.

She appeared in an episode of ITV's Ten Mile Menu which was aired on 20 July 2011 and was recorded in the town of Knaresborough in North Yorkshire.

In September 2012, Fospero began working as a stand-in newsreader, presenting news bulletins and Daybreak's newshour from 6–7 am. She occasionally presented the main show from 7–8.30 am and when this happened she also presented the following Lorraine programme. Daybreak was axed by ITV on 3 March 2014 and she made her last appearance on the show on 23 April 2014, just five days before it was replaced by Good Morning Britain.

In 2013, she was a guest presenter for This Morning, presenting the interactive 'Hub' segment of the show.

In November 2014, Fospero joined the BBC One consumer affairs programme Watchdog as a regular reporter. Since 2015, she has been a reporter for the BBC magazine show The One Show.

Fospero played Lucinda Towne in "The National Anthem", an episode of the anthology series Black Mirror. She played herself in two episodes of Southcliffe and one episode of the BBC Two documentary series How TV Ruined Your Life.

=== Radio ===
Fospero has been an occasional newsreader on BBC Radio 5 Live, and also acts as a stand-in presenter on the station's weekend breakfast programme. She also sits in for regular presenters on BBC London 94.9. In 2015, she sat in for Anne Diamond on BBC Radio Berkshire.

== Personal life ==
Fospero is a patron of the Nicholls Spinal Injury Foundation, where she has been involved in raising £5 million to speed up research for a breakthrough cure for paralysis.

== Filmography ==
Television

Year	Title	Role
1997–2002	GMTV	Showbiz correspondent & US correspondent
2002–2005	BBC Look North	Co-presenter
2006–2007	Sky News Sunrise	Weekend co-presenter
2009–2010	GMTV	Newsreader/stand-in presenter
2011–2014	Lorraine	Stand-in presenter (45 episodes)
2011–2014	Daybreak	Newsreader/Stand-in presenter
2011	This Morning	Occasional newspaper reviewer
2011	Ten Mile Menu	Guest appearance (1 episode)
2011	How TV Ruined Your Life	Herself (1 episode)
2011	Black Mirror	Lucinda Towne (Episode: "The National Anthem")
2013	This Morning: The Hub	Guest presenter
2013	Southcliffe	Herself/guest appearance (2 episodes)
2014—	Watchdog	Reporter
2015—	The One Show	Reporter
2015–2020	Countdown	'Dictionary Corner' guest (40 episodes)
