= Peter Levy =

Peter Levy may refer to:

- Peter Levy (cinematographer), Australian cinematographer
- Peter Levy (presenter) (born 1955), British TV and radio presenter

== See also ==
- Peter Levi (1931–2000), professor of poetry
