= Caroline Bilton =

British television presenter

- Born: 3 February 1976 (age 49); Anlaby, Humberside, England
- Occupation: Presenter
- Website: Presenter Profile

Caroline Bilton (born Caroline Davis on 3 February 1976 in Anlaby, Humberside), in 2007 was a British television presenter and stand-in anchor of the BBC regional news programme Look North, broadcast from Hull to the East Riding of Yorkshire and Lincolnshire when Peter Levy was on leave.
