= Damian Johnson (broadcaster) =

Damian Johnson is a broadcaster with BBC Sport who was born in Hull.

He currently works as a reporter on the football programmes Match of the Day and Football Focus, as well as presenting and reporting on various other sporting programmes, notably including the Super League Show on BBC One in regions in Northern England. He started his broadcast career in 1986 in commercial radio in Sheffield. He joined the BBC in 1989 as a television producer, working for BBC Look North based in Leeds. He has also presented the sports news on BBC Look North in East Yorkshire and Lincolnshire. He currently presents the sports news on the BBC News channel from MediaCityUK in Salford.

== Sports TV presenter ==
Johnson was a part of the BBC's TV coverage of the South Africa 2010 FIFA World Cup, presenting a series of magazine style mini-documentaries and interviews before and after matches - notably before England's crucial 2nd round tie with Germany. He has reported from three World Cup tournaments, three European Championships and six Africa Cup of Nations tournaments. During that time he has interviewed the biggest names in the sport – top English players like David Beckham, Steven Gerrard and Wayne Rooney, international stars like Zinedine Zidane, Thierry Henry and Cristiano Ronaldo as well as managerial giants Sir Alex Ferguson, Jose Mourinho and Fabio Capello.

== Voice over work ==
Johnson has narrated commercial sports DVDs. including “The Highbury Years” a retrospective on Arsenal's time playing at Highbury before moving to the Emirates Stadium, “Season Review 2005/2006” the story of Liverpool's remarkable campaign when they won what some say is the best FA Cup Final of the modern era beating West Ham United in Cardiff and travelled to Japan to contest the World Club Championship and “Ten Years of Super League” – a look back at the first decade of rugby league's ground breaking English club competition.
