= Flag of Lincolnshire =

Flag of English county

- Proportion: 3:5
- Adopted: 24 October 2005

The official flag of Lincolnshire was unveiled at five separate ceremonies across the county on 24 October 2005. The flag was chosen in a popular vote organised by BBC Radio Lincolnshire along with Lincolnshire Life magazine. The winning entry, designed by Lincolnshire-born Michelle Andrews, a web producer at BBC Lincolnshire, was selected from a shortlist of six designs and attracted thousands of votes.

== History ==
The design was the result of a two-year campaign, prompted by a letter to County News from two caravan owner readers from Moulton, to raise the county's profile. The campaign was taken up by BBC Radio Lincolnshire, which launched a campaign in partnership with Lincolnshire Life magazine that culminated in a vote. The campaign was supported by local businesses, who saw it as a good way to promote trade and tourism in Lincolnshire.

=== 2005 competition finalists ===
Design 1

Design 2 (winner)

Design 3

Design 4

Design 5

Design 6

== Design ==
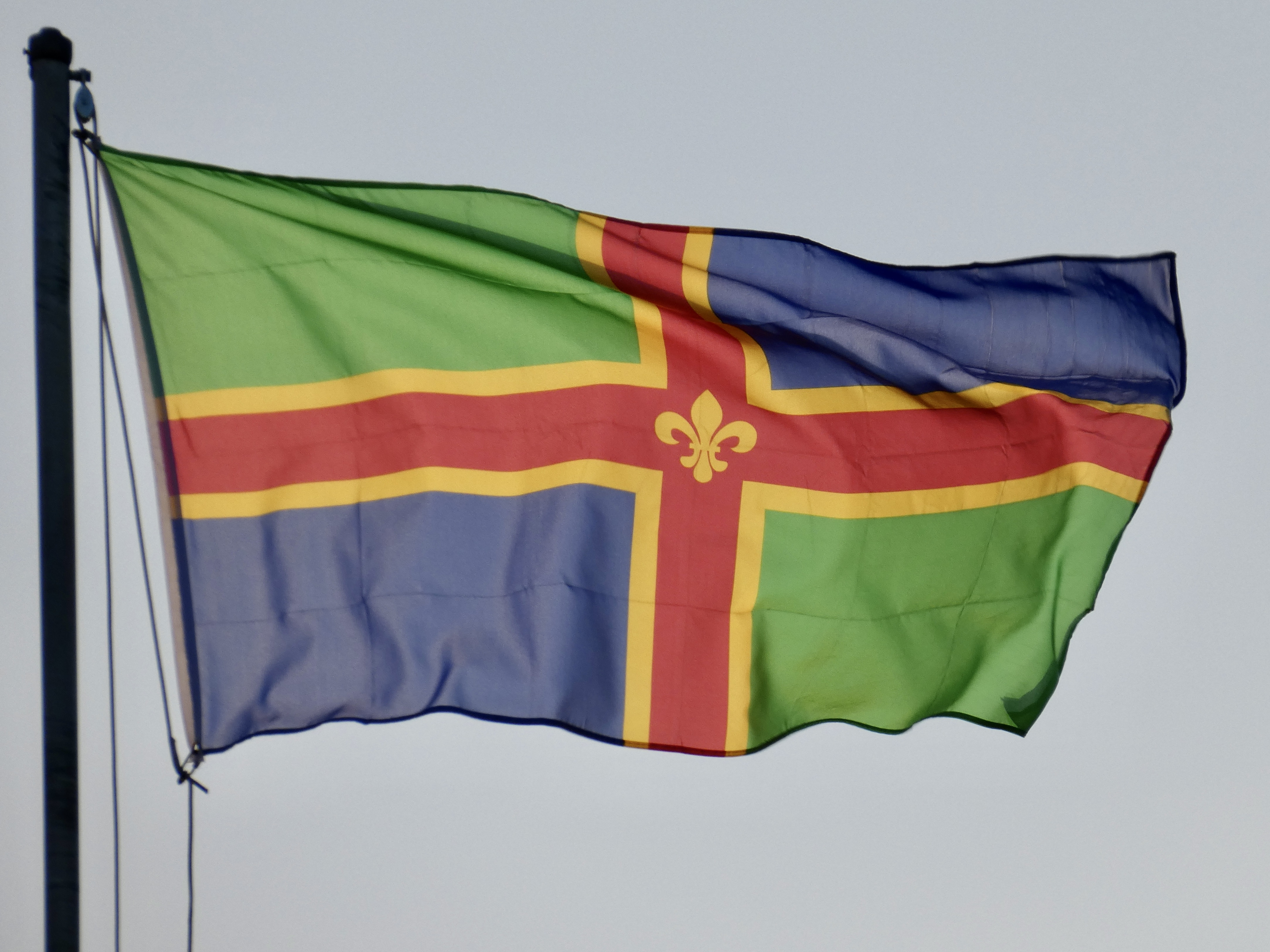
Flag of Lincolnshire, White Hart Hotel, Boston

The flag features a red cross, edged in yellow and bearing a yellow fleur-de-lys, on a background of green and blue quarters; in the jargon of blazon, Quarterly Vert and Azure, on a Cross Gules fimbriated Or a Fleur-de-Lys of the last.

The red cross is the Saint George's Cross representing England. Yellow represents the crops grown in the county, as well as the nickname "Yellowbellies" given to people born and bred in Lincolnshire. Blue represents both the sea of the East coast and the wide skies of Lincolnshire, and green symbolises the rich lushness of fenland fields. The fleur de lys is a recognised symbol of the City of Lincoln.

The Pantone Colours for the flag are:

- Green 355
- Blue 286
- Yellow 109
- Red 186

== See also ==
- Flag Institute
