= Paulette Edwards =

British radio presenter

Paulette Edwards (born 1963/64) is a British radio presenter. She is known for her work with BBC Radio Sheffield.

== Biography ==
Edwards was born in Sheffield to Jamaican parents. She attended the (now defunct) Earl Marshal School and graduated from Huddersfield Polytechnic. She began her career as a teacher before health issues forced her to pursue her career in radio.

Her transition from teaching to broadcasting reflects her career development and connection to the local community, contributing to her recognition as a Sheffield-based media figure with an established audience.
