= BBC Radio Lincolnshire =

BBC Local Radio service for Lincolnshire, England

Coordinates: 53.2382°N 0.5380°W

Lincoln; England
- Broadcast area: Lincolnshire
- Frequencies: FM: 94.9 MHz (Belmont); FM: 104.7 MHz (Grantham); DAB: 10D; Freeview: 714
- RDS: BBCLINCS

Programming
- Language: English
- Format: Local news, talk and music

Ownership
- Owner: BBC Local Radio, BBC Yorkshire and Lincolnshire, BBC East Midlands

History
- First air date: 11 November 1980
- Former names: BBC Lincolnshire (2009–2012)
- Former frequencies: 1368 MW

Technical information
- Licensing authority: Ofcom

Links
- Website: Official Website

BBC Radio Lincolnshire is the BBC's local radio station serving most of the county of Lincolnshire.

It broadcasts on FM, DAB, digital TV and via BBC Sounds from studios near Newport Arch in Lincoln.

According to RAJAR, the station has a weekly audience of 73,000 listeners as of May 2025.

== History ==
A BBC national broadcasting site covering the area had opened at the Corporation's Stamp End Depot on Thursday 8 March 1951 and carried an opt-out programme 'News from the North'.

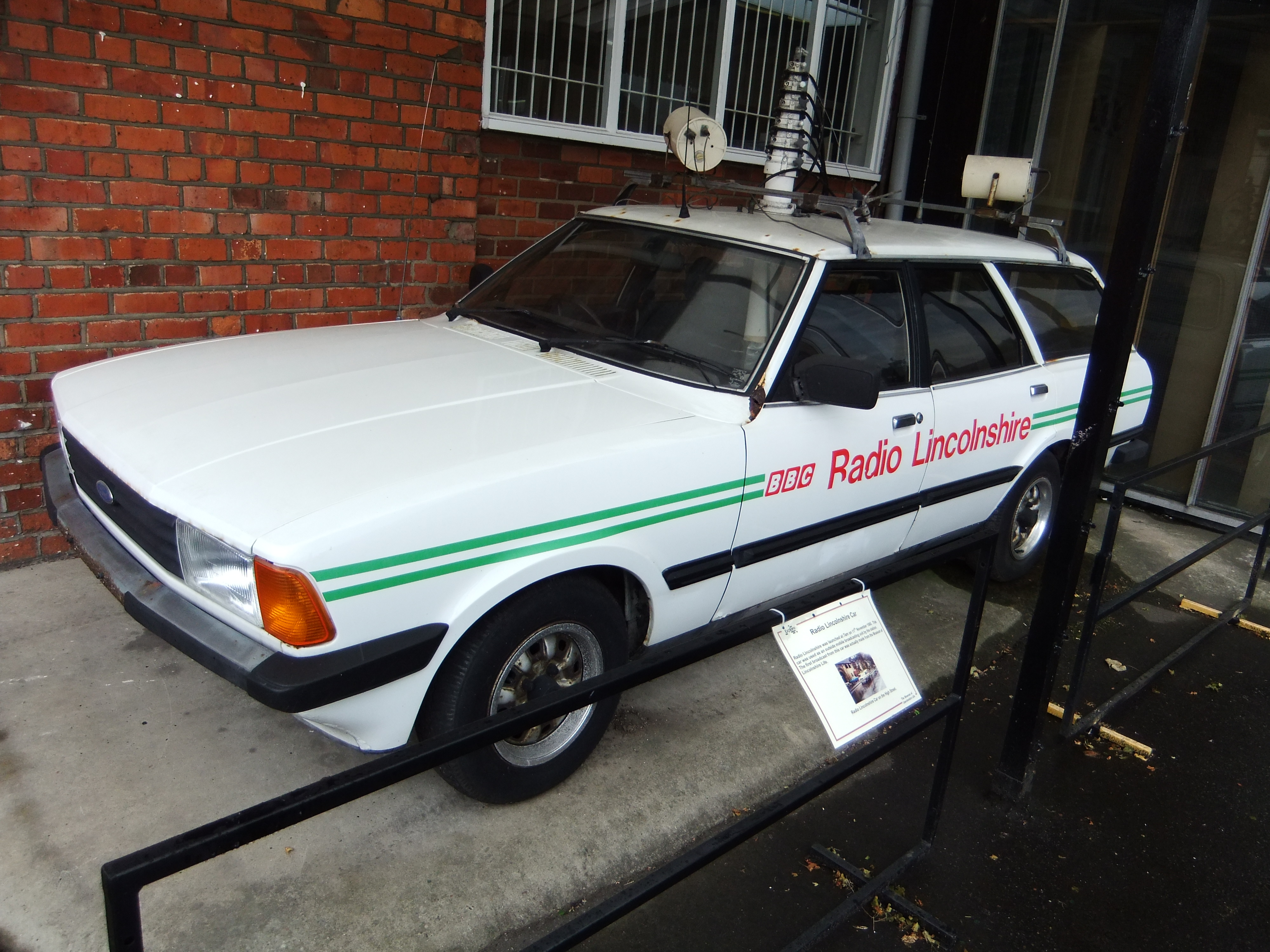
BBC Radio Lincolnshire radio car from the 1980s, preserved at the Museum of Lincolnshire Life in Lincoln.

Almost three decades later, on 11 November 1980 at 7 am, the county got its own station when BBC Radio Lincolnshire opened with a commissioned peal of bells from Lincoln Cathedral with the first words spoken coming from Nick Brunger: "And it's a warm welcome for the first time to the programmes of BBC Radio Lincolnshire."

In 1988, the station commissioned UK jingle producer Alfasound to compose a jingle package based on the traditional English folk song The Lincolnshire Poacher, continuing on this theme until 2006.

For most of its first decade on air, BBC Radio Lincolnshire did not broadcast during the evening and simulcast BBC Radio 2 from around 7 pm on weekdays and 5 pm at the weekend. However, the end of the 1980s saw BBC Local Radio begin weeknight programmes with stations broadcasting a mostly regional, rather than local, service, networked on all the stations in that area. BBC Radio Lincolnshire broadcast its own programmes until 9 pm before joining with the other East Midlands stations to air a late show which broadcast from 9 pm until midnight. However evening programming at the weekend didn't begin until many years later and the station still handed over to BBC Radio 5 Live mid-evening at the weekend until well into the 2000s.

In 2006, BBC Radio Lincolnshire conducted a six-month trial of XDA pocket-PCs for the BBC, using Technica Del Arte's Luci mobile (on the hoof) interviewing application.

The station used to have a BBC Bus, until cutbacks in early 2008 forced budget priorities to be streamlined.

On 15 January 2018, BBC Radio Lincolnshire stopped broadcasting on medium wave.

=== Management ===
Under its first manager, Roy Corlett, the station achieved record audience figures as its programming of news, music and chat became very popular. Corlett left to found BBC Radio Devon and was replaced briefly by Laurie Bloomfield, who also left to launch a new BBC local station, BBC Radio Shropshire.

After Bloomfield's brief stay, the station was managed for 14 years by David Wilkinson, one of the founding team, and a local radio pioneer from his days at BBC Radio Nottingham in 1968. Upon Wilkinson's retirement in 1999, the station was taken over by BBC Radio Leicester managing editor, Charlie Partridge. In 2004, the station recorded record audience figures – according to RAJAR, listeners were tuned into BBC Radio Lincolnshire for longer ("hours") than any other radio station in the country.

The Lincolnshire flag was chosen by listeners in 2005

=== Lincolnshire flag ===
In October 2005, it presided over the creation of a new flag for Lincolnshire.

=== Name change ===
The station changed its name from BBC Radio Lincolnshire to BBC Lincolnshire on 30 November 2009. The name reverted to BBC Radio Lincolnshire in May 2012.

== Technical ==
The main signal on 94.9FM comes from the Belmont transmitting station near Donington on Bain in the north of the county, which, until the height reduction carried out in September/October 2009, was the tallest mast in Europe.

Radio Lincolnshire covers the majority of the county but areas in Northern Lincolnshire, including Barton upon Humber and Immingham, Instead, North Lincolnshire is officially served by BBC Radio Humberside. Even though the station doesn't cover Northern Lincolnshire, Radio Lincolnshire can still be heard in the area on DAB.

The station also covers South Lincolnshire, however the area can only receive their radio signals from the Peterborough transmitter which broadcast BBC Radio Cambridgeshire on 95.7 FM and on DAB.

The station also broadcasts on Freeview TV channel 714 in the BBC Yorkshire and Lincolnshire, BBC East Midlands, and BBC Yorkshire regions and streams online via BBC Sounds.

Until early 1992, Radio Lincolnshire was the only local radio station in Lincolnshire. This changed when Lincs FM began broadcasting.

The station broadcasts on DAB from the Belmont transmitter. For Lincolnshire, a DAB multiplex could have only been realistically established by financial investment from the Lincs FM Group, and other transmitter positions could theoretically be used. The DAB licence, was advertised in October 2007, which will not cover Stamford or South Holland, but will cover North Lincolnshire (Scunthorpe) and North East Lincolnshire (Grimsby). On 24 January 2008, the company MuxCo Lincolnshire was the only company to bid for the Lincolnshire DAB licence. It is 51% owned by the Lincs FM Group, and will have transmitters at Belmont, High Hunsley (in East Yorkshire), Grantham and Lincoln County Hospital. They were awarded the DAB licence on 19 February 2008. Transmissions were expected to begin by July 2009, but funding for the project delayed the roll-out and the multiplex went on air in September 2015.

== Programming ==
Local programming is produced and broadcast from the BBC's Lincoln studios from 6 am to 10 pm on Mondays to Saturdays and from 6 am to 6 pm on Sundays.

Off-peak programming, including the late show from 10 pm to 1 am originates from BBC Radio Leeds (weekdays), BBC Radio WM (Saturdays), BBC Radio York (Sunday evenings) and BBC Radio Norfolk (Sunday nights).

During the station's downtime, BBC Radio Lincolnshire simulcasts overnight programming from BBC Radio 5 Live and BBC Radio London.

=== Specialist programming ===
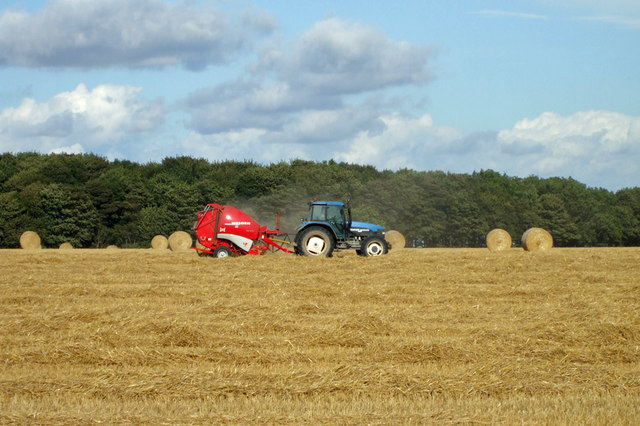
BBC Radio Lincolnshire is the only BBC local radio station to have a dedicated farming programme.

The station's sports strand, Hope and Glory, broadcasts full commentary on all Lincoln City football matches with additional commentary of Boston United and Gainsborough Trinity matches online. There are also specialist podcasts for both Lincoln City and Boston United

Radio Lincolnshire also has a dedicated farming programme on Sundays at 6pm, which the station has aired since it began broadcasting and when schedule changes came in 2023. The Farming show made BBC Radio Lincolnshire the only local BBC station not to have Dotun Adebayo on a Sunday night.

=== Former programming ===
A weekly news bulletin in Portuguese was broadcast for migrant workers until July 2008. It was read by Rui Silva, who worked for Boston Borough Council.

== Events ==
Since the early 1980s, a race had been held at the Market Rasen Racecourse, the BBC Radio Lincolnshire Novice's Hurdle. In recent years, this has become the Mike Molloy Memorial Handicap Chase, named after a former sports presenter who died of Myeloma.

In 1983, it formed a charity trust, thought to be the first in the UK for a radio station. This became known as Going for Gold. Originally GOLD stood for Give Our Lincolnshire Defibrillators. Since then, money has been raised for a number of other local causes.

It held an annual folk song competition called "Song For Lincolnshire" from 2015 until 2020.

BBC Farmwatch was started by BBC Radio Lincolnshire in 2024 and turned into a country-wide project. It's a 24-hour broadcast for farmers, keeping them company during their buisiest day of the year.

== Notable former staff ==
- Boothby Graffoe, comedian who presented a two-hour programme on Friday evenings on the station, and briefly on Radio Nottingham, in the late 1980s.
- John Inverdale, presenter of national sports programmes on BBC Television and BBC Radio 5 Live, started his radio career as a morning presenter from 1982 until 1985, having worked for two years at the Lincolnshire Echo. He has claimed it is the most enjoyable job he has ever had, despite the early mornings.
- Dave Bussey who replaced Inverdale as morning presenter, who, in the 1980s, also presented weekend shows for BBC Radio 2.
- Sky News weather forecaster Jo Wheeler worked for a number of years as a Saturday afternoon programme presenter at BBC Radio Lincolnshire.
- BBC Director of Sport, Roger Mosey, began his career at the station.
- Sky News's Washington correspondent Emma Hurd, who also presented on East Midlands Today.
- BBC News Washington correspondent, and former Newsround presenter, Matthew Price, was a reporter with BBC Radio Lincolnshire in the mid-1990s.
- Owain Wyn Evans
