= BBC Look North (Yorkshire and North Midlands) =

British TV news programme (since 1968)

- Title card used since April 2022
- Theme music composer: David Lowe
- Country of origin: United Kingdom
- Original language: English

Production
- Producers: BBC News; BBC Yorkshire
- Production locations: Broadcasting Centre, 2 St Peter's Square, Leeds LS9 8AH
- Camera setup: Multi-camera
- Running time: 30 minutes (main 6:30 pm programme); 10 minutes (1:30 pm and 10:30 pm programmes); Various (on weekends and Breakfast)

Original release
- Network: BBC One Yorkshire
- Release: 25 March 1968 – present

Related
- BBC Look North (East Yorkshire and Lincolnshire), BBC Look North (North East and Cumbria), ITV News Calendar

BBC Look North is the BBC's regional television news service for West, South and North Yorkshire and northern parts of Nottinghamshire and Derbyshire. The service is produced and broadcast from the BBC Broadcasting Centre at St. Peter's Square in Leeds with district newsrooms based in Bradford, Sheffield and York.

Look North can be watched in any part of the UK (and Europe) from Astra 2E on Freesat channel 966 and Sky channel 954. The latest edition of Look North is also available to watch on the BBC iPlayer.

== Coverage area ==
The Leeds programme covers the editorial areas of Radio Leeds and Radio Sheffield. Due to the size of North Yorkshire, the listenership of Radio York is covered by the geographically multitudinous Look North programmes from Leeds and Newcastle.

The programme is available online through BBC iPlayer. In some (but not all) areas of North Yorkshire viewers have their aerials point to Bilsdale TV transmitter that broadcasts the Newcastle edition of Look North, however most viewers in the county point their aerial to the Emley Moor or Oliver's Mount Transmitter to watch the Leeds edition of Look North. Viewers in Scarborough and some in Filey receive the Leeds edition from the relay transmitter at Oliver's Mount.

North Nottinghamshire (Bassetlaw), northeast Derbyshire (Chesterfield), the eastern High Peak (Hope Valley) and northern area of the Derbyshire Dales (Tideswell and Hathersage) receive better signals from the Emley Moor transmitter rather than the Waltham transmitter which means Look North covers those areas.

Some parts of the East Riding of Yorkshire (Goole, Pocklington and Market Weighton) and parts of Lincolnshire (Gainsborough and some western parts of Scunthorpe) get better television signals from the Emley Moor transmitter that broadcast the Leeds edition of Look North rather than the Belmont TV transmitter. However, most of those areas (except the Goole area, which has always received the Leeds edition on satellite channel 101), are given Look North broadcasting from Hull on Channel 101 through satellite television such as Freesat as default via the towns' postcodes.

A small part of East Lancashire around Barnoldswick and Earby is also served by Look North. This area is served by a local transmitter in Skipton which is relayed from the Emley Moor TV transmitter.

However, western parts of North Yorkshire including Settle cannot receive signals from the Emley Moor transmitter but instead get the Winter Hill transmitter the broadcast North West Tonight from Salford.

== Broadcast ==
On weekdays, Look North in Yorkshire and the North Midlands broadcasts three main bulletins: a 15-minute lunchtime news during the BBC News at One, the main half-hour programme at 6.30 pm and a 15-minute late bulletin at 10.30 pm, following the BBC News at Ten.

Look North also airs three bulletins during the weekend: early evening bulletins on Saturday and Sunday and a late night bulletin on Sundays, following the BBC News at Ten. The times of these bulletins usually vary.

Breakfast bulletins during BBC Breakfast aired at 27 and 57 minutes past each hour until 6 June 2016, when the opt-outs were merged with those provided by Look North's sister service in East Yorkshire and Lincolnshire, as part of a pilot scheme from the BBC's Hull studios. Since May 2021 however, these bulletins now come from the BBC's Leeds studios.

== History ==
Before 1968, the region was served by regional output from Manchester, launched in September 1957 with daily News from the North bulletins for the entire north of England. The start of a separate programme for the North East & Cumbria in 1959 allowed the daily bulletins to focus on the North West and Yorkshire and Lincolnshire areas. The programme was extended to 20 minutes in 1962 and renamed North at Six (later Look North). BBC regional television from Leeds has been broadcast since Monday 25 March 1968.

The launch of a dedicated regional news service from Leeds allowed for greater coverage of the two distinct areas on each side of the Pennines. It also coincided with the decision to introduce a separate ITV contractor for the east of the Pennines, Yorkshire Television, which went on air in July 1968 along with its own regional news magazine, Calendar. Prior to that, Yorkshire had been covered by the Manchester-based contractors ABC (weekends) and Granada (weekdays).

The original team of Look North presenters and reporters from Leeds included John Burns, Barry Chambers, David Haigh, James Hogg and David Seymour.

Look North from Leeds was the main programme for the whole of the 'BBC North' (later 'Yorkshire & Lincolnshire') region until 11 November 2002, when a new studio had been built in Hull, and the programme split in two. A short opt-out service for the East Yorkshire and Lincolnshire had been in service since 2001. The programme was first produced from All Souls' Church in Blackman Lane, Leeds, where part of the church had been converted into a black-and-white television studio with attendant equipment.

In 1974, Look North moved to new studios at Broadcasting House on Woodhouse Lane near Leeds Metropolitan University and around the corner from All Souls Church. The new facilities, equipped for colour, remained the base for Look North Leeds and other regional programmes until 26 September 2004.

A new broadcasting centre was built near the West Yorkshire Playhouse on St Peter's Square, with BBC Look North moving into the new premises on 27 September 2004. The move coincided with the introduction of a new BBC region for Yorkshire and the North Midlands. On Monday 13 May 2024, the programme broadcast in HD for the first time.

== Presenters ==
Main presenters

- Clare Frisby (Breakfast / Lunchtime)
- Amy Garcia (evenings)
- Amanda Harper (evenings)
- Phil Bodmer
- Sally Hurst (Sport)
- Dave Edwards (Breakfast / Lunchtime)
- Keeley Donovan

Weather presenters

- Paul Hudson (Monday – Wednesday)
- Keeley Donovan (Thursday / Friday)
- Katerina Christodoulou
- Emmanuelle Lhoni

== Former on air team ==
- Christa Ackroyd – (2001–2013)
- Tanya Arnold
- John Cundy – (1991–2018) news correspondent for 27 years
- Harry Gration – (1982–1995, 1999–2020) (Died 2022)
- Will Hanrahan – (1986–1987) later reporter for BBC Watchdog and Good Morning with Anne and Nick
- Sophie Raworth (1995–1997)
- Judith Stamper (1985–1995)
- Len Tingle – (2001–2018) political editor 2001–2018
- Ian White – (1997–2022)

Former weather presenters

- Darren Bett
- Gillian Brown
- Abbie Dewhurst
- Nicola Donnelly
- Lisa Gallagher (now Relief weather presenter on Look North)
- Owain Wyn Evans
