= Huntcliff School, Kirton in Lindsey =

Kirton Academy
- August 2006

Location
- Redbourne Mere; Kirton in Lindsey, Lincolnshire, DN21 4NN; England
- Coordinates: 53.4771°N 0.583196°W

Information
- Type: Academy
- Department for Education URN: 150867 Tables
- Ofsted: Reports
- Chair of Trustees: Mr S Chandler
- Head Teacher: Emma Ricketts
- Staff: 80
- Gender: Mixed
- Age: 11 to 16
- Enrolment: 570 as of April 2022
- Capacity: 870
- Website: https://kirtonacademy.co.uk/

Kirton Academy is a mixed secondary school located in Kirton in Lindsey, North Lincolnshire, England.

== History ==
The school opened as Kirton Lindsey Secondary Modern School. John Rawlinson joined as headteacher in January 1955, after seven years at Shepton Mallet Secondary Modern School, being originally from Dagenham. The previous headteacher, Mr L Scott, moved to become head of the new Moulton County Modern School.

In 1958, it became Kirton Huntcliff Secondary School.

Those children from Scawby and Hibaldstow would move to Westmoor Secondary School (became the Vale of Ancholme School, in 1976) at Brigg, when that school was built in September 1959. The early school in the 1950s had houses of Witham, Ancholme, and Trent and had been opened by the Lindsey Education Committee.

In the mid-1970s, around 60% of those at the school were non-grammar school children from villages such as Hemswell, Scotter, and Willoughton in West Lindsey. Lincolnshire was not joining the comprehensive system, as it was universally opposed in the rural areas of the county, so children in that part of West Lindsey would have to choose another secondary school.

=== Comprehensive ===
In September 1976, the school was enlarged to 620, when comprehensive education was introduced to the Brigg area. The new head would be Mr B Parkington, who had moved from Doncaster.

Lincolnshire Education Committee said that it could start going comprehensive by 'possibly 1995', led by the Chairman, Jean Wootton, of Horbling Hall. George Venables Cooke, who was the chief education officer, having been chief education officer of Lindsey from 1964, and given the CBE in the 1978 New Year Honours, had taken over from John Birkbeck, who had been there since 1936. Fred Rickard took over from George Cooke in September 1978. Today, people in North Lincolnshire, close to West Lindsey are patrons of grammar schools in the West Lindsey district.

It later became a community school administered by North Lincolnshire Council.

=== Academy Status ===
January 2007

Huntcliff School was converted to academy status on 1 February 2012. However the school continues to coordinate with North Lincolnshire Council for admissions.

Huntcliff School was rebranded as Kirton Academy on 1 May 2024 and is now under the Lincolnshire Gateway Academies Trust.

== Curriculum ==
Huntcliff School teaches GCSEs, BTECs, OCR Nationals and vocational courses as programmes of study for pupils. Vocational courses are taught in conjunction with North Lindsey College.

== Houses ==
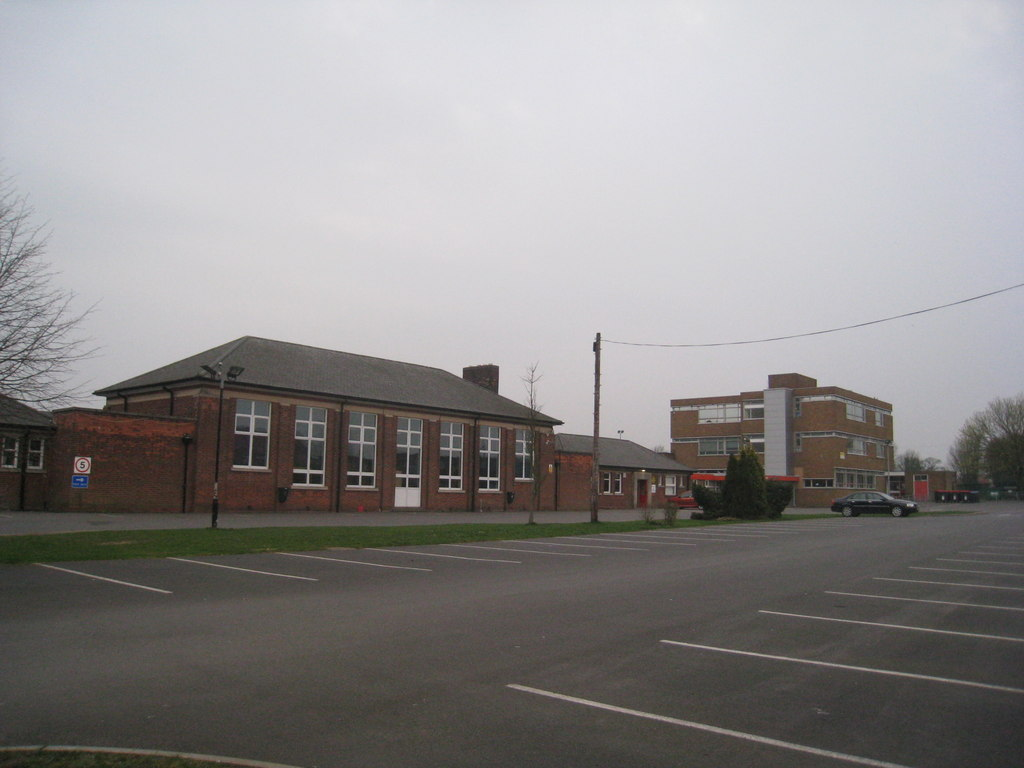
March 2011

The school utilises a vertical tutoring system, which places students from across all years into tutor groups, with the intention of the older students guiding the younger students through their schooling life.

The school has four houses, named after famous ships, however the names are also the names of arguably more famous NASA space programmes. They are:

- Atlantis
- Apollo
- Discovery
- Endeavour

== Alumni ==
- Darren Bett, weather forecaster
