= David Burns (radio presenter) =

British radio presenter (born 1959)

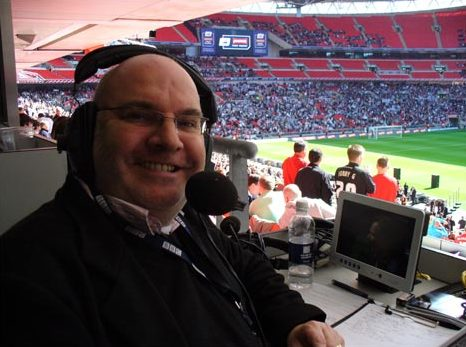
- David Burns at Wembley Stadium with Grimsby Town in May 2008
- Born: David Burns; 26 April 1959 (age 67); Glasgow, Scotland
- Presenting career
- Show: Mid Morning / Lunchtime
- Station: BBC Radio Humberside
- Time slot: 10.00 am – 2:00 pm Monday-Friday
- Style: Local Interest
- Country: United Kingdom
- Website: www.bbc.co.uk/news/england/hull_and_east_yorkshire

David Burns (or Burnsy) (born 26 April 1959 in Glasgow, Scotland) is a British radio presenter working for the BBC. He is best known for his sports commentary, analysis and discussion on BBC Radio Humberside.

== Biography ==
Up until June 2023, he was the presenter of the mid-morning programme at BBC Radio Humberside. He also commentated on Hull City games, where he is affectionately known as Burnsy.

His co-presenters on air were Gwilym Lloyd, Matt Dean and Mike White. He is also regularly joined by former Hull City, Scunthorpe United and Grimsby Town players – notably Peter Swan and George Kerr. In May 2011, the sports team of David Burns, John Tondeur, Matt Dean, Mike White and John Anguish won a Sony bronze award in the best sports programme category for their coverage of Grimsby Town's relegation.

In mid-2011, he moved to a non-sport daytime programme, discussing the day's news and playing music between 09:00 and 12:00 daily. He continues to present commentary on Hull City, but is no longer active on Sports Talk during weekday evenings.

In June 2023, he presented his last show on BBC Radio Humberside and left to join 107FM, a community radio station in Hull, where he currently presents Monday evenings 8–10 pm.

== Awards ==
- Radio Broadcast Presenter of the Year, Yorkshire and Humber – 2015, 2016, 2017
