= South Hunsley School =

South Hunsley School & Sixth Form College
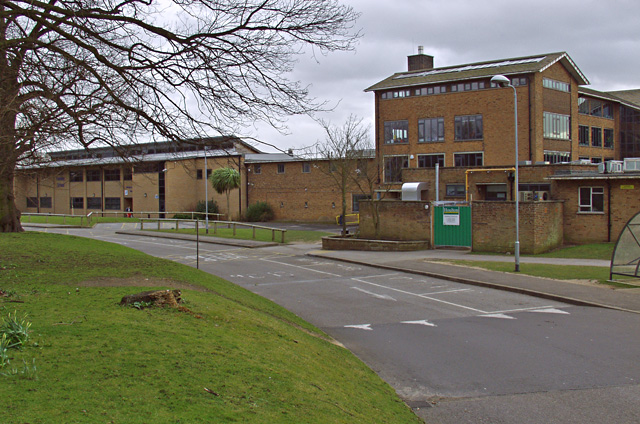

Location
- East Dale Road; Melton, East Riding of Yorkshire, HU14 3HS; England; 53°43′39″N 0°32′06″W

Information
- Type: Secondary Academy
- Motto: Inspire • Aspire
- Established: 1956
- Department for Education URN: 136667 Tables
- Ofsted: Reports
- Head teacher: Michaela Blackledge
- Age: 11 to 18
- Enrolment: 2200
- Website: http://www.southhunsley.org.uk/

South Hunsley School & Sixth Form College is a large secondary school and sixth form, situated in Melton in the East Riding of Yorkshire, England, near the A63. In April 2010, the school became an Academy.

== Admissions ==
As of 2013, the grouping systems were: Years (7, 8, 9, 10, 11, 12, 13) Houses (Indus, Draco, Pegasus, Orion, Hercules, Vela) Form (1-12 Formatted Year-Form (e.g. Year 7 form 3 is written as 7–3))

As of 2012 South Hunsley is a specialist Technology college. The school has public sporting facilities including a gymnasium, climbing wall and a 3G football pitch. The school had a large swimming pool and leisure facility until its closure in 2016.

In 2007, 69% of pupils gained 5 grade A-C GCSEs, including English and Maths, the best for state schools in the East Riding of Yorkshire, with almost 2000 students.

South Hunsley School is rated outstanding by Ofsted, and is placed in the top 3% of schools nationally.

== History ==
The school was founded as South Hunsley County Secondary School in 1956. It occupies 48 acres (0.19 km^{2}), and has been expanded since opening.

In late 1960s, money was raised for a swimming pool. In June 1968 a contract was signed for a heated pool. The pool opened in 1970, being officially opened in June 1972.

Over the half-term, in the early hours of Saturday 26 October 1991, a fire gutted the staff room. Police suspected arson by someone with a grudge, with £300,000 of damage.

In 2014, the South Hunsley Primary was set to open in September 2015.

== Headteachers ==
- 1956, Frank Makin, attended Corpus Christi College, Cambridge, and taught at Burnley and Stretford grammar schools, he married in 1949, with three daughters; he died aged 66 on 24 December 1984
- April 1962, Mr Tom Gifford Daffern, retired July 1970, he came from Sandford, Somerset, and married a fellow teacher at St John the Evangelist Church, Ridgeway in August 1937
- 1970, Mr Frederick Barrie Salt, a former RAF education officer
- 1988, Keith Chisholm

== Alumni ==
- Harry Cardwell, footballer.
- Sarah Cruddas, science broadcaster.
- Alex Deakin, Met Office weather presenter.
- Loz Hardy and Myles Howell of Kingmaker.
- Daniel James, footballer.
- Marc Pickering, actor
- Lynn Simpson, canoeist in the 1992 and 1996 Olympics
- Debra Stephenson, actress.
- Jess Park, footballer.
- Keir Mather, MP
