= Darren Bett =

BBC weather forecaster

- Born: Darren Victor Bett; July 21, 1968 (age 58); Scunthorpe, Lincolnshire, England
- Occupation: Weather forecaster
- Years active: 1989–present

Darren Victor Bett (born July 1968 in Scunthorpe, Lincolnshire) is an English weather forecaster for the BBC, broadcasting on television and radio. Bett is a main weather presenter on BBC Radio 5 Live and also appears on the BBC News Channel, BBC World News, BBC One and BBC Radio 4.

== Early life ==
He was born in Scunthorpe War Memorial Hospital in July 1968, the son of Margaret Goodband (1943-2024) and Victor Bett. His father studied at North Lindsey Technical College in the field of the iron and steel industry. His brother Russell was born on 6 June 1971.

As well as Scunthorpe, Bett lived in Kirton in Lindsey, on Highfield Drive, where he attended primary school.

He attended the Huntcliff School, Kirton in Lindsey, where he gave a talk on 21 October 1993. He completed his A levels in maths, physics and chemistry at John Leggott College, in the west of Scunthorpe. He studied at the University of East Anglia in Norwich, receiving a degree in environmental science in 1989.

== Career ==
In September 1989, he joined the Met Office as a weather forecaster. He worked at Glasgow Weather Centre and the National Meteorological Centre in Bracknell, then moved to the Leeds Weather Centre in 1992. From 1994, he was one of the main weather presenters for the local regional news programmes Calendar and Look North. He moved to London to work for the BBC News Channel (then called BBC News 24) in November 1997, to be replaced in Leeds by Paul Hudson.
