= Don Donovan =

Irish footballer and manager

Personal information
- Full name: Daniel Christopher Donovan
- Date of birth: 23 December 1929
- Place of birth: Cork, Ireland
- Date of death: 26 September 2013 (aged 83)
- Position: Right-back

Senior career*
Years	Team	Apps	(Gls)
1947–1948	Maymount Rovers		
1948–1949	Dalymount Rovers		
1949–1958	Everton	179	(2)
1958–1964	Grimsby Town	238	(1)
1964–1969	Boston United	142	(0)

International career
1954–1957	Republic of Ireland	5	(0)

Managerial career
- 1965–1969: Boston United
- * Club domestic league appearances and goals

Daniel Christopher "Don" Donovan (23 December 1929 – 26 September 2013) was an Irish professional football player and manager.

== Career ==
He was a right back who played for Everton and Grimsby Town. Donovan joined Everton in 1951 from junior football in Ireland and went on to play 187 times for The Toffees scoring just twice. In August 1958, he was transferred to Grimsby Town for a fee of £5,000 where he played until 1964 before becoming player manager of Boston United. He was a huge success at Boston, winning League titles in each of his three seasons with the club.

At international level, he represented Republic of Ireland five times at senior level making his debut in November 1954

His son Terry Donovan was also a professional footballer who went on to play for the Republic of Ireland, and his granddaughter is Keeley Donovan, the weather presenter.

== Death ==
Donovan died on 26 September 2013.
