= Christa Ackroyd =

British journalist and broadcaster

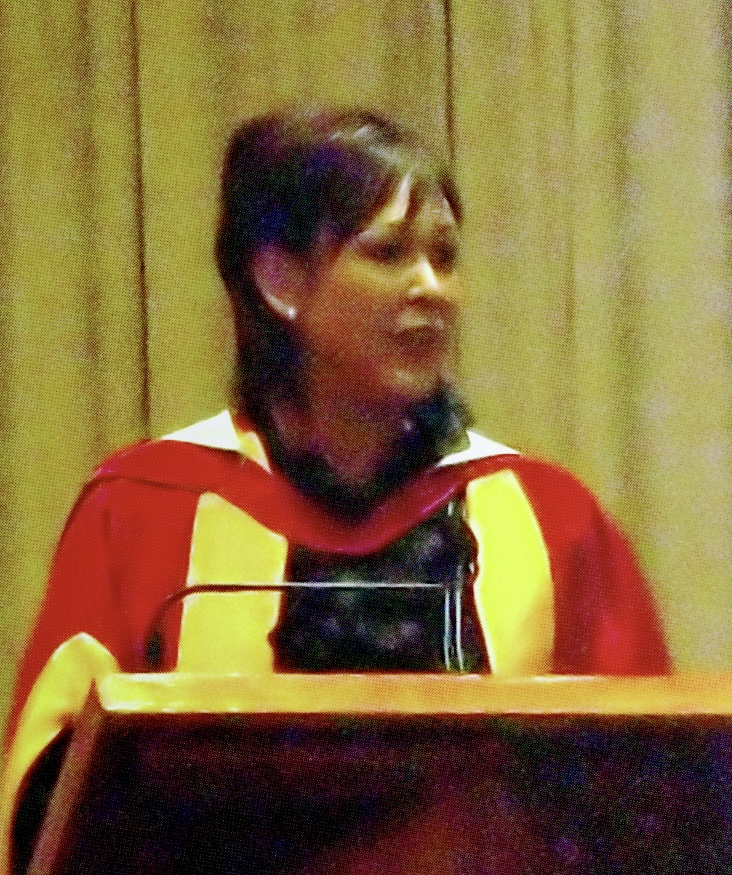
- Ackroyd receiving an honorary degree from the University of Bradford in 2008
- Born: Christa Marion Ackroyd; Bradford, England
- Known for: Television presenter
- Spouse: Chris Sutcliffe
- Children: 3

Christa Marion Ackroyd is an English journalist and broadcaster, best known as a former presenter for the regional TV news programmes Calendar (for Yorkshire Television) and BBC Look North.

== Early life ==
Ackroyd was born and educated in Bradford; her father was a policeman.

== Career ==
=== Print and radio ===
After leaving school, Ackroyd spent four years working for the Halifax Courier. She began her broadcasting career in the newsroom of commercial radio station Pennine Radio in Bradford (now The Pulse of West Yorkshire), where she led the station's coverage of the Yorkshire Ripper case.

In 1981, she moved to neighbouring Radio Aire in Leeds, reading its first news bulletin on its opening day. In November 1982, she was appointed as the UK's first female radio news editor. Ackroyd was promoted as Radio Aire's programming controller in 1985, often presenting weekend shows and the station's flagship news programme, Radio Aire Reports.

In 2014, Ackroyd was made patron of Radio Aire's Cash for Kids charity.

=== Regional television news ===
Ackroyd switched to television in 1990 and became a co-anchor for Yorkshire Television's regional news programme Calendar, originally alongside Richard Whiteley, and later, Mike Morris. In September 2001, she switched to the BBC to present the Leeds-based edition of Look North with Harry Gration.

While working at Yorkshire Television and the BBC, Ackroyd also wrote a weekly column for the Sunday Express. In 2004, she refused to give up the column following a BBC request amid concerns over impartiality. She resigned from the paper in January 2007.

=== Departure from the BBC ===
Ackroyd presented her last Look North programme on 1 March 2013. Several weeks later, a Yorkshire Post article questioned her absence from the programme and whether her salary, reported to be around £150,000 per year, was justified. The BBC declined to explain her prolonged absence, citing unspecified "editorial reasons". Shipley MP Philip Davies called for the corporation to explain whether Ackroyd was still being paid despite her ongoing absence.

In July 2013, the BBC announced that Ackroyd had been dismissed after what was considered to be an unspecified "breach of contract" and would not return to present Look North. Ackroyd's freelance contract was terminated without compensation.

== Taxation case ==
In July 2013, it was revealed that HM Revenue and Customs had started an investigation into Ackroyd's tax arrangements, whilst employed by the BBC. Under an agreement with the BBC, Ackroyd was employed via what became known as a Personal Services Company Contract, Christa Ackroyd Media Limited, through which her remuneration was paid, whist still being herself directly contracted to the BBC. In February 2018, the First Tier Tribunal confirmed that for the tax years covering 2006–07 to 2012–13, Ackroyd owed income tax and National Insurance contributions (NICs) amounting to £419,151. It was the first IR35 case that HMRC had won in seven years. The court documents indicate Ackroyd's BBC contract was ended because of HMRC's formal demand made against her. The judge in the case said that Ackroyd had done nothing wrong, had acted honestly and had been 'encouraged' by the BBC to sign such a contract. In February 2019 Lord Hall, the Director General of the BBC, told a commons committee that the corporation took full responsibility for the use of personal services company contracts and apologised to presenters.

== Personal life ==
Ackroyd and her husband live on the Yorkshire Moors and have three children. In July 2008 she was awarded an honorary degree by the University of Bradford alongside former co-anchor Harry Gration. She is also a fellow of Bradford College.
