= BBC Look North (East Yorkshire and Lincolnshire) =

BBC television news programme

- Title card used since April 2022
- Theme music composer: David Lowe
- Country of origin: United Kingdom
- Original language: English

Production
- Producers: BBC News; BBC Yorkshire and Lincolnshire
- Production locations: Kingston upon Hull, England
- Running time: 30 minutes (main 6:30 pm programme); 10 minutes (1:35 pm and 10:30 pm programmes); Various (on weekends and Breakfast)

Original release
- Network: BBC One Yorks & Lincs
- Release: 11 November 2002 – present

Related
- BBC Look North (North East and Cumbria), BBC Look North (Yorkshire and North Midlands); BBC East Midlands Today, Calendar

BBC Look North is the BBC's TV news service for East Yorkshire and Lincolnshire, produced by BBC Yorkshire and Lincolnshire. The programmes are produced and broadcast from the BBC Broadcasting Centre at Queens Court in Kingston upon Hull, with reporters also based in Lincoln.

Peter Levy is the main presenter/newsreader on the 1:35 pm and 6:30 pm weekday bulletins, whilst the 10:30 pm and BBC Breakfast bulletins are presented by different journalists.

The programme can be watched in any part of the UK (and Europe) from Astra 2E on Freesat channel 967 and Sky channel 957, and in select areas on Virgin Media channel 858. The latest edition of Look North is also available to watch on the BBC iPlayer.

== Broadcasts ==
On weekdays, Look North broadcasts six three-minute opt-outs during BBC Breakfast at 27 and 57 minutes past each hour – as of June 2016, the bulletins are also shared with Look North's sister service in Yorkshire and the North Midlands, as part of a pilot scheme. These bulletins originally came from the BBC's Hull studios, but since May 2021, they have come from the BBC's Leeds studios.

A 10-minute lunchtime news airs at 1:35 pm, before the main half-hour edition at 6:30 pm. and a 10-minute bulletin shown at 10:30 pm, following the BBC News at Ten.

Look North also airs three bulletins during the weekend: early evening bulletins on Saturday and Sunday and a late night bulletin on Sundays, following the BBC News at Ten. The times of these bulletins vary.

== Coverage area ==
The programme's main coverage area is East Yorkshire and Lincolnshire, the editorial areas covered by BBC Lincolnshire and BBC Radio Humberside. Some households in rural north-west Norfolk, such as King's Lynn, Hunstanton and Wells-next-the-Sea, and eastern parts of Nottinghamshire, such as Retford, Mansfield and parts of Newark, receive the Hull edition of Look North.

Freeview viewers in Goole, Gainsborough, Market Weighton, Pocklington and some western parts of Scunthorpe get better television signals from the Emley Moor transmitter that broadcasts Look North from Leeds. However, most of those areas (except the Goole area, which has always received the Leeds edition on satellite channel 101) are given Look North (East Yorkshire and Lincolnshire) on Channel 101 through satellite television such as Freesat as default via the towns' postcodes.

South west of Lincolnshire (South Kesteven) is served by East Midlands Today that broadcasts from Nottingham, which is received from the Waltham transmitter. However, the area can still switch to the Belmont transmitter to watch Look North, which also covers the area.

== History ==
Look North's Hull-based programme began in November 2002, presented by Helen Fospero and Peter Levy. The programme was presented from a small television studio built into the existing BBC Radio Humberside building on Chapel Street and was directed from a technical gallery at Leeds. The programme's first editor was Roger Farrant.

Before 11 November 2002, this region was part of a BBC North region, served by Look North from Leeds with short six-minute opt-outs for the area (introduced during 2001) during the main evening programme at 6:30 pm and the BBC Ten O' Clock News. The November 2002 changes saw the opt extended to become a full half-hour programme at 6:30 pm, with the 10:25 pm opt-out remaining unchanged. Daytime and weekend bulletins were carried from Leeds.

In 2004, Look North, along with BBC Radio Humberside and the Online/Interactive Project, moved to new studios and offices in Queen's Gardens. Within a short time of going live from the new studios, dedicated daytime and weekend bulletins for the region were introduced, replacing the previous arrangement of carrying bulletins from Leeds.

== Presenters ==
=== News ===
- Peter Levy – Main Presenter – Monday-Friday (Lunchtime & 6:30 Evening)
- Jo Makel
- Gemma Dawson
- Crispin Rolfe
- Leanne Brown
- Jessica Lane
- Phillip Norton

=== Weather ===
- Keeley Donovan
- Paul Hudson

== Reporters ==
=== Videojournalists ===
- Caroline Bilton

=== Correspondents ===
- Simon Clark – Sport

== Former on air team ==
- Sarah Cruddas
- Helen Fospero
- Hannah Moffat
- Damian Johnson (Presented Sport round up on Mondays)
- Owain Wyn Evans
