= Clare Frisby =

English newsreader and presenter

Clare Kathleen Frisby is a newsreader for Look North based in Leeds, West Yorkshire, England.

== Early life ==
She first attended Bennett Memorial Diocesan School. Later she was the head girl of Combe Bank School, an independent school in Kent, where she took part in drama.

== Journalism career ==
Frisby became a BBC News trainee in London in October 1989 and worked in newsrooms throughout the UK for the BBC and was one of the few female reporters in Saudi Arabia during the Gulf War. She was at BBC Radio York for four years. Her television debut was as a presenter on Look North. Frisby went on to present other bulletins for the region and the neighbouring BBC Yorkshire and Lincolnshire area.

In September 2007, she became a presenter for The Politics Show for the region. She also presented the breakfast news bulletins in the Look North (Leeds) area for 15 years, before switching to lunchtime news slot and a Saturday morning radio show.

== Personal life ==
Frisby was one of 18 high-profile Yorkshire women chosen by Councillor Bernard Atha to share the role of consort Lady Mayoress of Leeds 2000–01.

She has two sons, Ollie and Freddie. She lives in Copmanthorpe, North Yorkshire.
