= BBC Look North =

BBC Look North is a name used by the BBC for its regional news programmes in three regions in the North of England:

- BBC Look North for the BBC North East and Cumbria region
- BBC Look North for the BBC Yorkshire region
- BBC Look North for the BBC East Yorkshire and Lincolnshire region

Prior to 1980, BBC North West Tonight for the BBC North West region, was also called BBC Look North.

== See also ==
- BBC Look East
