= Owain Wyn Evans =

British broadcaster and drummer

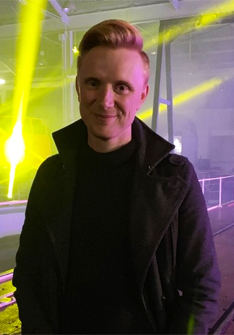
- Evans in 2019
- Born: 9 March 1984 (age 42); Ammanford, Carmarthenshire, Wales
- Occupations: Broadcaster (Radio and television)
- Years active: 2003–present
- Employer: BBC
- Known for: BBC Look North; BBC Radio 2 The One Show; BBC Breakfast; BBC North West Tonight; BBC Radio 5 Live; BBC Radio Wales
- Television: BBC Look North; BBC North West Tonight; The One Show; BBC Breakfast

Owain Wyn Evans (born 9 March 1984) is a Welsh broadcaster and drummer. He hosts BBC Radio 2's early breakfast show and previously presented weather bulletins on BBC Look North, North West Tonight and BBC Breakfast. Evans is also a regular item presenter for The One Show.

In addition to his television work, he is known for his drumming, social media and LGBTQ activism. He is patron of the charity LGBT Foundation.

== Career ==
=== Television work ===
Evans began his broadcasting career at the age of 18 when he became the presenter of Welsh language children's news programme Ffeil.

He then worked as a reporter, presenter and video journalist for BBC Wales and in 2012 began presenting the weather on BBC Wales Today. Evans presented weather forecasts across many BBC nations and regions between 2012 and 2019, with four years for BBC Look North (East Yorkshire and Lincolnshire). In September 2019, it was announced that Evans would be the new lead weather presenter for BBC North West Tonight following the death of long-serving weather presenter Dianne Oxberry, joining from BBC Northwest Today/Tonight.

In April 2020 Evans joined Carol Vorderman on a tour across Wales where he taught her to speak the Welsh language for the S4C TV programme Iaith ar Daith.

In August 2020, he made his debut as a reporter for the television magazine and chat show programme The One Show.

In 2020, he appeared as a celebrity guest on Michael McIntyre's game show The Wheel and co-presented BBC's New Year's Eve The Big New Year's In alongside Maya Jama and Paddy McGuinness.

In February 2021 he made his debut presenting the weather on BBC Breakfast.

In April 2022, Evans participated in the reality competition series Freeze the Fear with Wim Hof.

=== Digital broadcasting ===
Evans has been credited for introducing short-form video forecasts on social media, having first produced these on the video sharing platform Vine in 2013. He has developed these into GIF forecasts and stickers, which are available on most social media platforms.

In 2017 Evans celebrated International Drag Day by giving a drag queen–themed forecast that pays tribute to drag queens and RuPaul's Drag Race.

=== Radio presenting ===
In 2012 Evans began presenting on BBC Radio Cymru and since then has presented a number of radio programmes for BBC Local Radio stations across England.

Since December 2020, Evans has hosted a series of 'in conversation with...' shows for BBC Sounds and BBC Local Radio in which he interviews stars including Dolly Parton, Kylie Minogue and Little Mix.

From September 2021 to February 2022, Evans regularly provided cover for OJ Borg on Radio 2.

In April 2022, Evans returned to Radio 2 to become the main cover presenter for Vanessa Feltz.

On 4 October 2022, It was announced that Evans would become the new permanent presenter of Radio 2's Early Breakfast Show, following Feltz's departure, the previous July. He began on 13 February 2023.

=== Drumming ===
Evans drums as a hobby, having started when he was 7 years old. In April 2020, early in the COVID-19 lockdown in the UK, Evans produced a video of himself drumming the BBC News theme immediately after presenting a weather forecast. The video went viral, and was featured on news outlets across the world.

The local radio and television project Owain's Big House Band saw Evans joined by hundreds of other musicians who played along to the original video from their own homes during the COVID-19 pandemic lockdown.

=== Children in Need drumathon ===
On 13 November 2021, Evans completed a 24-hour drumathon in support of the charity Children in Need. Starting and ending on BBC Breakfast, he spent 24 hours drumming continuously (with a five-minute break every hour) while presenting the Drumathon iPlayer channel, chatting with other drummers, urging people to donate, and describing the experience. By completion, at 8:35 a.m. that day, the event had raised £1,617,046, having doubled in its last 90 minutes. The sum was expected to grow with further donations and had reached £2,621,750 by lunchtime that day. On 15 November, 48 hours after the challenge, the project had raised £3,062,418, making it the most successful 24-hour challenge in the 41-year history of BBC Children in Need.

== Awards and accolades ==
Evans has featured on the WalesOnline 'Pinc List' of the most influential LGBTQ people from Wales on numerous occasions.

In July 2019, Evans was awarded Best TV Presenter at the O2 Media Awards for Yorkshire and Humber.

In November 2021, Evans was awarded the Best Regional Presenter and Best Breakthrough Talent awards at the Royal Television Society North West Awards.

Evans received an honorary doctorate from the University of Bolton in July 2022 for outstanding contribution to broadcasting, becoming Doctor of Arts. He was asked to perform a drum solo during the ceremony, with the university donating £10 to the appeal for Ukraine for every drum beat, up to a maximum of £1,000.

== Personal life ==
Evans was born in Ammanford, Carmarthenshire, Wales. At the age of 17 Evans came out as gay to friends and family members.

Evans has spoken out about homophobic abuse received on Twitter for his presenting style and continues to be vocal in his support for the LGBTQ community.

On 11 March 2017, Evans married his long-term partner Arran Rees in London.
