= BBC Yorkshire and Lincolnshire =

English region of the BBC

- BBC Yorkshire and Lincolnshire's area within the UK
- TV transmitters: Belmont
- Radio stations: BBC Radio Humberside; BBC Radio Lincolnshire
- Headquarters: Kingston upon Hull
- Area: East Yorkshire; Lincolnshire; West Norfolk parts of Nottinghamshire
- Nation: BBC English Regions
- Key people: David Jennings (Head of Regional & Local Programmes)
- Launch date: November 2002

BBC Yorkshire and Lincolnshire, sometimes abbreviated to BBC Yorks & Lincs, is the name for the BBC's twelfth English Region, based in Kingston upon Hull and created from the division of the former BBC North region, based in Leeds (now known as BBC Yorkshire). The primary transmitter is located at Belmont and covers East Yorkshire, Lincolnshire, north west Norfolk and eastern parts of Nottinghamshire.

== Services ==
=== Television ===
The regional output of BBC Yorkshire and Lincolnshire consists of the flagship Look North, and the Yorkshire and Lincolnshire edition of Politics North, one of the regional successors to Sunday Politics.

=== Radio ===
The region is the controlling centre for the local radio stations BBC Radio Humberside and BBC Radio Lincolnshire.

Both radio stations simulcast some programming from each other, the radio stations in the BBC Yorkshire region, and with BBC Radio 5 Live.

=== Online and Interactive ===
BBC Yorkshire and Lincolnshire also produces regional news & local radio pages for BBC Red Button and BBC Local News websites for each county.

== History ==
Announced as part of the BBC's 'Project Hull' investment in October 2001, BBC Yorks and Lincs began as a seven-minute opt-out on the Belmont transmitter of the main Look North programme from Leeds, presented by Clare Frisby and the late bulletin following the Ten O'Clock News. On 11 November 2002, the Look North programme for the region launched as a full programme presented by Peter Levy and Helen Fospero. The programme expanded into new headquarters in April 2004, and the BBC Yorkshire and BBC Yorks and Lincs region became officially separate.

BBC Yorkshire and Lincolnshire's first Head of Regional and Local Programmes (HRLP) was Helen Thomas, appointed in March 2004. In November 2006, Helen Thomas became HRLP of BBC Yorkshire in Leeds, and Catherine Hearne was appointed HRLP of BBC Yorkshire and Lincolnshire. She took up her post in January 2007, but left to go to BBC West Midlands. The first Editor of Look North was Roger Farrant, whose departure to Bristol led to the appointment of Steven Punter as Editor in November 2004. Punter left the BBC soon after. Dave Betts ran Look North from 2006 until June 2007. Mark Hayman replaced him as the region's first TV News Editor running an integrated team of journalists and technicians, but has since moved to BBC West Midlands.

== Studios ==
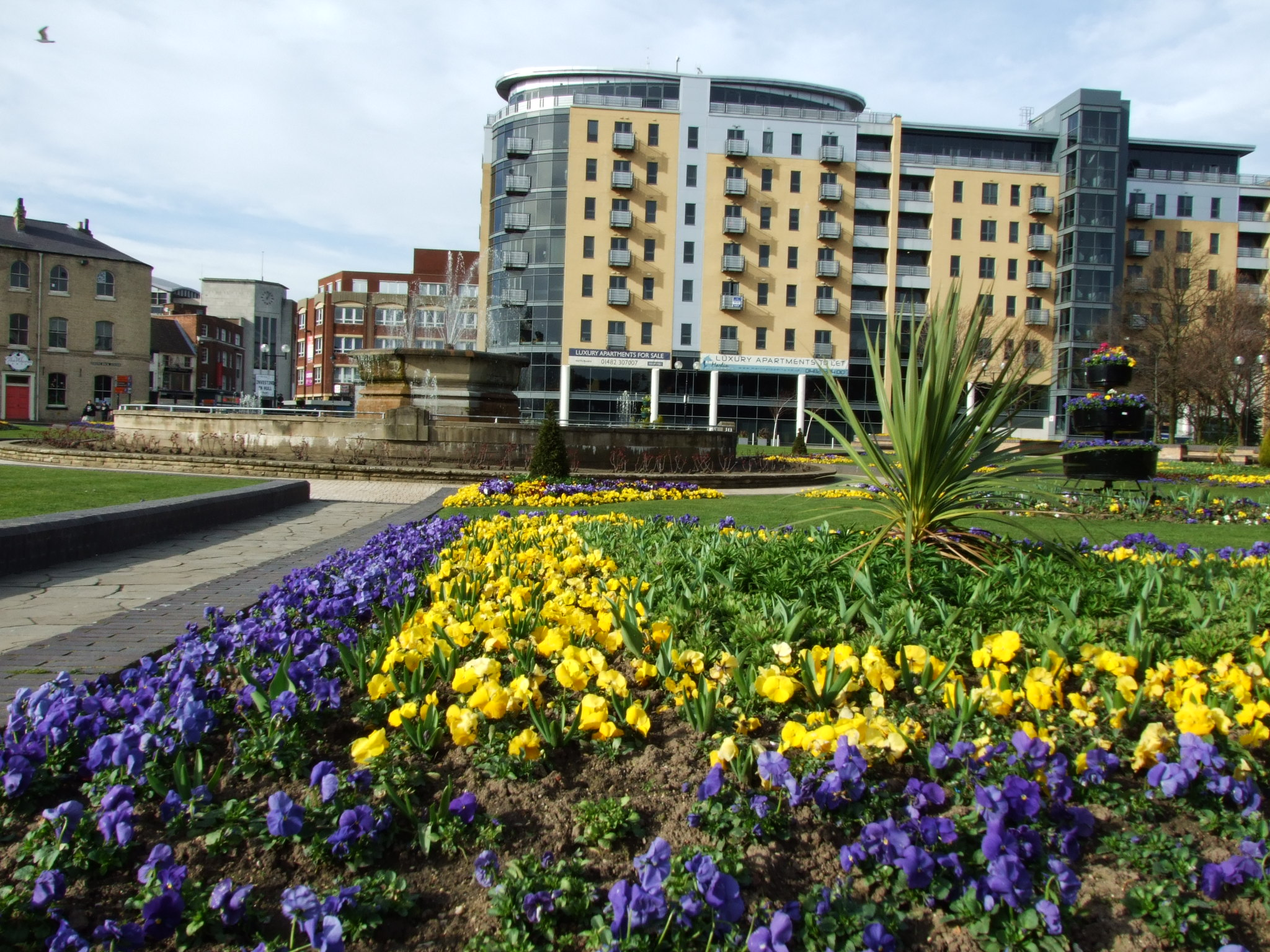
BBC Yorkshire and Lincolnshire's Hull headquarters

The first studios used by BBC Yorks and Lincs housed the opt-out service, launched in 2001, which operated from a studio above the Post Office in 9 Chapel Street, Hull. The small studios and team were enough to produce an opt-out, but when the time came in November 2002 to launch their own programme, the studio was noticeable for its size. It was so small that there was room for the desk only; other features such as weather had to be done elsewhere and played out on a screen in the studio.

Eventually, to coincide with the separation of the service, a new studio complex was built and unveiled by Manor Property Group at Queen's Court in Queen's Gardens in 2005. The new studio complex housed the new, expanded service, with a central newsroom, a good sized studio for the Look North programme, as well as radio studios for BBC Radio Humberside.

The region also has a news bureau in Lincoln, based at the studios of BBC Radio Lincolnshire.

== See also ==
- BBC English Regions
- BBC Radio Humberside
- BBC Radio Lincolnshire
- BBC Radio Sheffield
- BBC Radio Norfolk
