= BBC Radio Sheffield =

Coordinates: 53.3759°N 1.4668°W

Sheffield; England
- Broadcast area: South Yorkshire, north Derbyshire and North Nottinghamshire.
- Frequencies: FM: 88.6 MHz (Sheffield); FM: 94.7 MHz (Chesterfield and Bolsover); FM: 104.1 MHz (Doncaster, Barnsley, Rotherham and North Nottinghamshire); DAB: 11C; Freeview: 716
- RDS: BBC Shef

Programming
- Language: English
- Format: Local news, talk and music

Ownership
- Owner: BBC Local Radio, BBC Yorkshire

History
- First air date: 15 November 1967
- Former frequencies: 1035 MW

Technical information
- Licensing authority: Ofcom

Links
- Website: BBC Radio Sheffield

BBC Radio Sheffield is the BBC's local radio station serving South Yorkshire, north Derbyshire and North Nottinghamshire.

It broadcasts on FM, DAB, digital television and via BBC Sounds from studios on Shoreham Street in Sheffield.

According to RAJAR, the station has a weekly audience of 147,000 listeners and a 3.7% share as of December 2023.

== History ==
BBC Radio Sheffield was the second BBC local radio station, launching on 15 November 1967 and broadcasting from a large Victorian house in Westbourne Road in the Broomhill area of the city.

Until the mid-1980s, the station was generally on air from the morning until the early evening, with any programming after 6 pm devoted to specialist music and magazines aimed at minority interests and ethnic communities. These programmes did not broadcast all year round. In August 1986, evening programmes began on a permanent basis when the station joined with the other three BBC stations in Yorkshire to provide an early evening service of specialist music programmes on weeknights from 6 pm to 7:30 pm, extending a year later to six days a week (Wednesday to Monday) between 7 pm and 9 pm with Tuesdays reserved for local sports coverage. Just under two years later, on 29 May 1989, the BBC Night Network launched, which saw the BBC local radio stations in the North East and Yorkshire broadcasting networked programming every evening from 6:05 pm (6 pm at the weekend) until midnight, extending to 12:30 am in the early 1990s, and to 1 am by the end of that decade.

Spring 1989 also saw BBC Radio Sheffield launch Ten-35. This was a weekend evenings service of programmes for the county's ethnic minority communities and was broadcast on the station's MW frequency, hence the name of the strand. Radio Sheffield had provided programmes for the Asian and black communities for many years, but the new service saw the launch of programmes for many other communities. The service was broadcast on Saturday and Sunday evenings between 6 pm and midnight, although the Sunday programming was brought forward to 2:45 pm to 8:30 pm in around 1991 and was renamed as Ten-35 Sunday. Over time, the service was dismantled and eventually programming for minority communities was again focused on the county's black and Asian communities.

=== Archives ===
In March 1982, archiving began of the station's early material, by cataloguing and transferring it to audio cassette. The first items archived were news reports of the steel strike of 1980. The cassettes and listings, which include news stories and local music, are held at Sheffield City Archives in Sheffield. This archiving followed a scheme by Radio Carlisle which covered the October 1957 Windscale nuclear accident.

== Technical ==
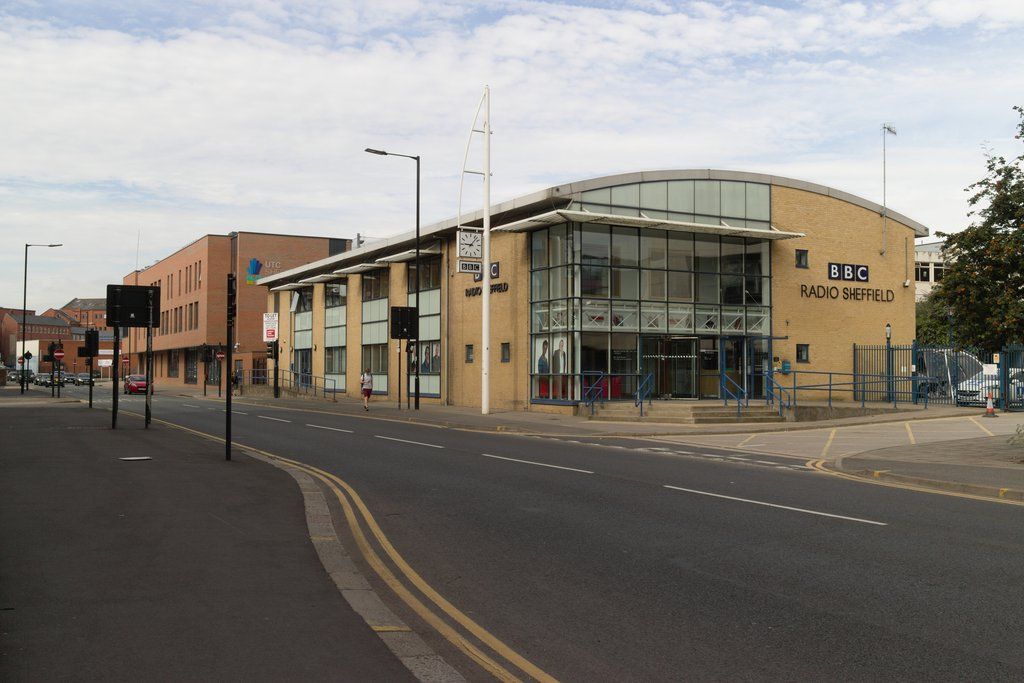
BBC Radio Sheffield building on Shoreham Street in Sheffield

The 104.1 FM signal is broadcast from the Holme Moss transmitter in West Yorkshire, near the border with Derbyshire, enabling the signal to be clearly heard in north Sheffield, Barnsley, north Rotherham, Doncaster and parts of Nottinghamshire.

The 88.6 FM signal is broadcast from the Crosspool transmitter on Tapton Hill to serve Sheffield and parts of Rotherham. It also broadcasts DAB on 11C multiplex for Sheffield and surrounding areas and it broadcasts DTR for South Yorkshire and surrounding areas for Freeview TV channel 716 on UHF 27-522 MHz the BBCA multiplex.

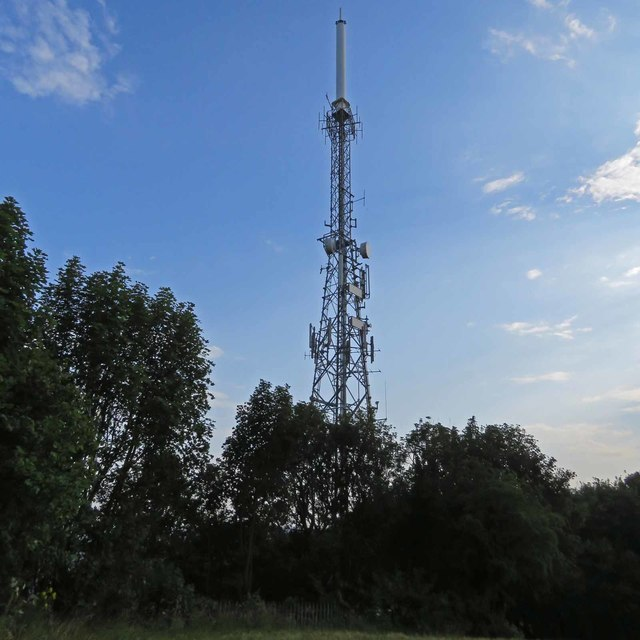
Chesterfield transmitter in July 2019

The 94.7 FM signal is broadcast from the Chesterfield transmitter at Unstone and serves Derbyshire, parts of Nottinghamshire and the East of South Yorkshire. It broadcasts DAB on 11C multiplex (same as Crosspool transmitter) for the Chesterfield and North Derbyshire area. It also broadcasts DTR for Chesterfield for Freeview TV channel 716 on UHF 26-514 MHz on the BBCA multiplex.

A DAB signal is broadcast from the Clifton transmitter (next to the M18 east of Rotherham) to serve Rotherham, Doncaster, Worksop and surrounding areas. Another DAB signal is broadcast from Ardsley transmitter east of Barnsley to serve Barnsley, Dearne Valley and parts of West Yorkshire. Plus, its DAB signals are also broadcast from the Clarborough transmitter near Retford to cover parts of North Nottinghamshire and strengthen signals from the Clifton transmitter. The three transmitters use the Bauer South Yorkshire 11C multiplex (same as Crosspool and Chesterfield transmitters).

The Emley Moor transmitter broadcasts DTR for Freeview TV channel 716 for Yorkshire, Derbyshire and parts of Lincolnshire on UHF 47-682 MHz the BBCA multiplex. Other local TV transmitters such as Crosspool relay their signal from Emley Moor. BBC Radio Sheffield is also broadcast on Freeview channel 716 from the Belmont transmitting station too.

The station also streams online via BBC Sounds.

While the FM, DAB and Freeview transmissions of BBC Radio Sheffield officially cover North Nottinghamshire, including the district of Bassetlaw which includes the towns of Retford and Worksop, editorially, news output is covered by BBC Radio Nottingham via its radio and internet news and social media channels, despite the area being officially outside the coverage area of BBC Radio Nottingham.

In its early years, Radio Sheffield transmitted from Rotherham (Boston Castle) on 95.0 MHz FM. This was discontinued when a powerful transmitter opened at Holme Moss serving much of South Yorkshire on 97.4 MHz, later changing to its current 104.1 MHz (97.4 MHz was then passed to Radio Hallam).

The ownership of FM radios was low when Radio Sheffield began broadcasting on FM only in 1967. However, most people could receive AM (medium wave (MW) and long wave (LW)) and, in response to the impending competition of commercial radio which would also broadcast on MW (Radio Hallam started in 1974), Radio Sheffield began transmitting in late 1973 on 1034 kHz (290 metres) MW – this changed to 1035 kHz in 1978. This was broadcast from the Broadfield Road transmitter in Sheffield (behind Heeley swimming baths) and served South Yorkshire, Derbyshire, Nottinghamshire and parts of Lincolnshire and West Yorkshire. The MW broadcasts were discontinued on 27 May 2021.

== Programming ==
Local programming is produced and broadcast from the BBC's Sheffield studios from 6 am to 2 pm each day and for sports coverage.

The station usually broadcasts the whole of the Late Night programme, a programme carried by all BBC local radio stations (except in the case of sports coverage), which is broadcast between 10pm and 1am.

During the station's downtime, BBC Radio Sheffield simulcasts overnight programming from BBC Radio 5 Live and BBC Radio London.

== Presenters ==
=== Notable current presenters ===
- Toby Foster (Weekday afternoons)
- Paulette Edwards (Weekday Mid-mornings)

=== Notable past presenters ===
- Gerry Kersey
- Tony Capstick
- Simon Clark (Sports presenter)
- Simon Groom
- Emlyn Hughes
- Ian MacMillan
- Rony Robinson

== See also ==
- BBC Local Radio
- BBC Night Network
- BBC Radio Leeds
- BBC Radio York
- Hallam FM
