= Peter Levy (presenter) =

British television and radio presenter

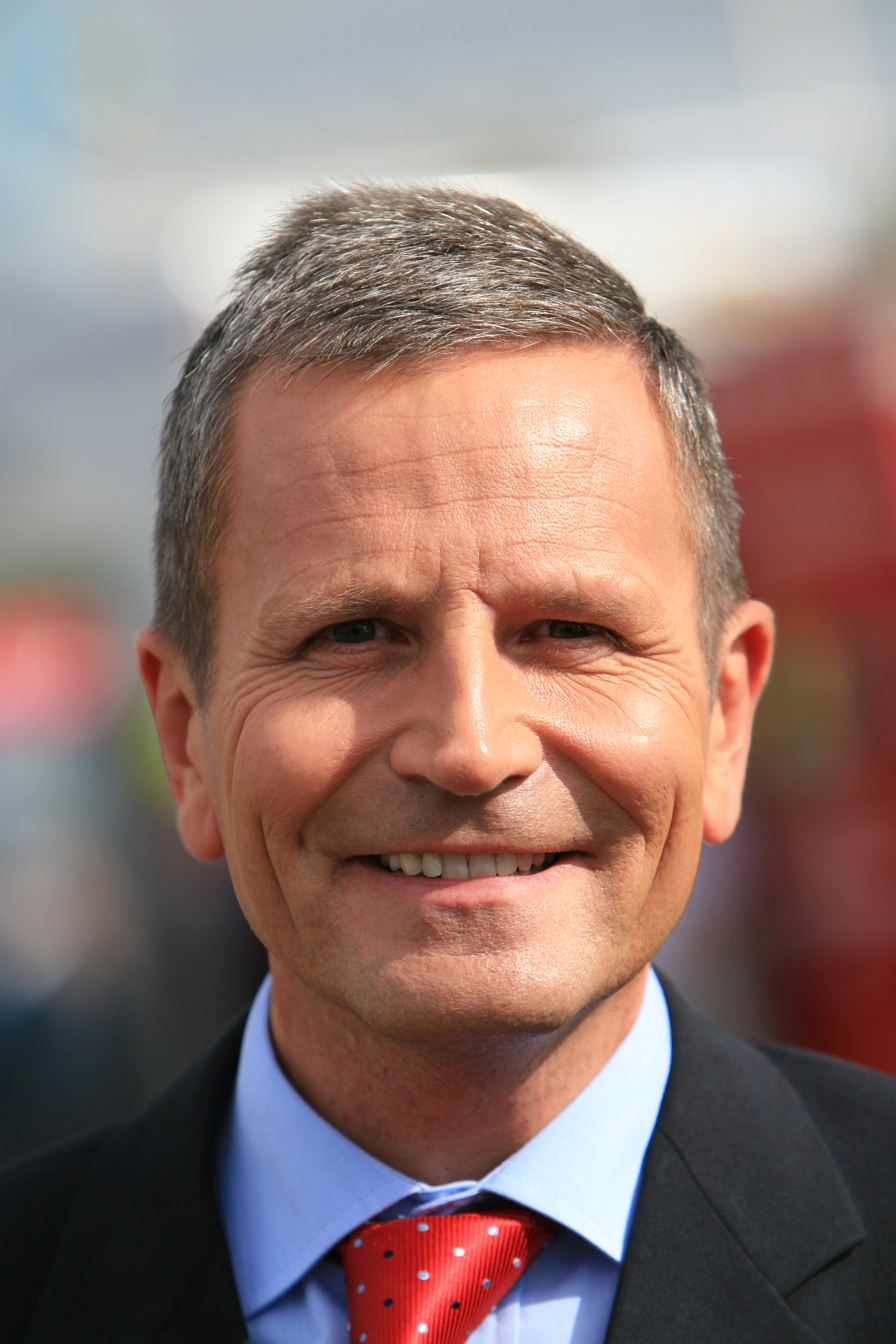
- Peter Levy in 2007
- Born: 5 September 1955 (age 70); Farnborough, Kent, England
- Occupations: Television; radio presenter
- Website: BBC Presenter Profile

Peter Levy (born 5 September 1955) is a BBC television and occasional radio presenter on BBC Radio Humberside. He previously worked in commercial radio.

Since November 2002, he has been a weekday presenter of the BBC regional news programme Look North. The programme is broadcast from the BBC's Kingston upon Hull studios to the areas of East Riding of Yorkshire, Lincolnshire, North West Norfolk and parts of Nottinghamshire via the Belmont transmitter.

== Early life ==
Levy was born in Farnborough, Kent, England, and attended a secondary modern school in Truro, Cornwall. He first came to Yorkshire in his late teens. He was an actor in his teenage years, with small roles in shows such as Dixon of Dock Green, Man About the House, Comedy Playhouse and The Mike Yarwood Show.

== Career ==
=== Radio ===
Levy was a disc jockey at Bradford's Pennine Radio (now Hits Radio West Yorkshire) from its launch in 1975 – having been hired by the then television journalist and later Member of Parliament Austin Mitchell. He became a presenter at Liverpool's Radio City in the 1970s, starting on the afternoon show before progressing to the drive time slot.

=== Television ===
He was then involved in local radio in the south of England before moving to Leeds to co-present BBC Look North.

He moved to Leeds-based Radio Aire, and then, in January 1987, to the BBC, eventually having a lunchtime show at BBC Radio Leeds. At this time he started as a regular stand-in presenter for the Leeds edition of Look North, always doing the breakfast bulletins. From between 1992 and 1993, Levy presented a BBC Two series entitled Famous Faces, Favourite Places in which he met well-known individuals who would revisit places of interest. During the programme he met individuals such as John Godber, Fred Trueman and Kathy Staff.

Look North was broadcast across the whole of the Yorkshire and Lincolnshire region at the time Levy started to work on it. He became the regular breakfast and lunchtime presenter of the programme in the mid-1990s. When the BBC split the region into two, Levy moved to present the Yorkshire and Lincolnshire edition from studios in Hull full-time from 11 November 2002.

In May 2005, a strike held by the National Union of Journalists (NUJ) saw 15,000 journalists and technicians leave their posts. NUJ members in Kingston upon Hull estimated that a quarter of the 120-strong workforce, including Look North presenter Peter Levy, crossed the picket lines at the city's BBC centre at Queen's Court.

Levy works with weatherman Paul Hudson and they have visited shopping centres around the region and met the public as part of the 2006 Look North Sofa Tour, this was repeated in 2009. The pair have made public appearances as part of a campaign in the East Riding of Yorkshire's libraries concerning reading among the under 11s.

He also appears on a regular basis in the ‘Nationwide’ segment on BBC News Channel's ‘Afternoon Live’.

== Appearances ==
Levy appeared in a 2003 Last of the Summer Wine episode called "The Man Who Invented Yorkshire Funny Stuff". He was also mentioned in series 1 episode 5 of The League of Gentlemen. He has also appeared in the comedy show Still Open All Hours.

In 2012, Levy opened the Beverley Food Festival along with the Mayor of Beverley, Margaret Pinder; he is a supporter of the Driffield Show and other country events.

In November 2025 he appeared in Inside No. 9 Stage/Fright when it toured at the Hull New Theatre.

== Personal life ==
Levy lives in Victoria Dock, Hull; he says "Because it’s such a close community in Hull, you can't really step out without being spotted. It is a little bit like being in a goldfish bowl. I'm a pretty shy person when it comes down to it, so it did take some getting used to, but the people of Hull are incredibly warm and friendly so it’s not really a chore." He is very protective of his adopted home, and once said live on air that the man who wrote the book Crap Towns (a book that had Hull as one of the "crappest") was an idiot and everyone who had been to Hull knew it was a "lovely city".

He regularly visits Cornwall, where his mother lives – it is here he indulges his love of bodyboarding and suggest he is "probably the oldest surfer in town."

On 24 July 2024, Levy was presented with an honorary doctorate by Bishop Grosseteste University in Lincoln.
