= BBC Radio Humberside =

Coordinates: 53.565752°N 0.082847°W

- Kingston upon Hull; England
- Broadcast area: East Riding of Yorkshire and Northern Lincolnshire
- Frequencies: FM: 95.9 MHz; DAB: 10D; Freeview: 713
- RDS: BBC Humb

Programming
- Language: English
- Format: Local news, talk and music

Ownership
- Owner: BBC Local Radio, BBC Yorkshire and Lincolnshire

History
- First air date: 25 February 1971
- Former frequencies: 96.9 FM; 1485 MW

Technical information
- Licensing authority: Ofcom

Links
- Website: BBC Radio Humberside

BBC Radio Humberside is the BBC's local radio station serving the former county of Humberside which includes the unitary authorities of East Riding of Yorkshire, Kingston upon Hull, North Lincolnshire and North East Lincolnshire in England.

It broadcasts on FM, DAB, digital TV and via BBC Sounds from studios at Queen's Gardens in Hull.

According to RAJAR, the station had a weekly audience of 100,000 listeners as of May 2025.

== History ==
BBC Radio Humberside began broadcasting in 1971 from studios above a post office on Chapel Street in Hull, three years before the county of Humberside was created. It has retained its name despite Humberside being abolished as a county in 1996. The station was initially only broadcast on VHF, with Medium wave broadcasts beginning in late 1971.

On the first night of broadcasting, many West Yorkshire rugby league fans were disappointed when the relatively powerful High Hunsley transmitter signal was broadcast instead of BBC Radio Leeds, so they heard a commentary of Hull KR v Widnes.

In 1979, Radio Humberside stopped broadcasting dedicated agricultural programmes despite serving agricultural areas.

For many years, the station sponsored a horse race at Beverley Racecourse. Originally, the race was called the Radio Humberside Handicap, which became the BBC Radio Humberside Stakes in the 1980s. By the 1990s, this included the Martin Plenderleith Conditions Stakes, the Steve Massam Selling Stakes, the Peter Adamson Maiden Auction Stakes, the Charlie Partridge Selling Stakes and the Chris Langmore Handicap that all took place on the same day in early July.

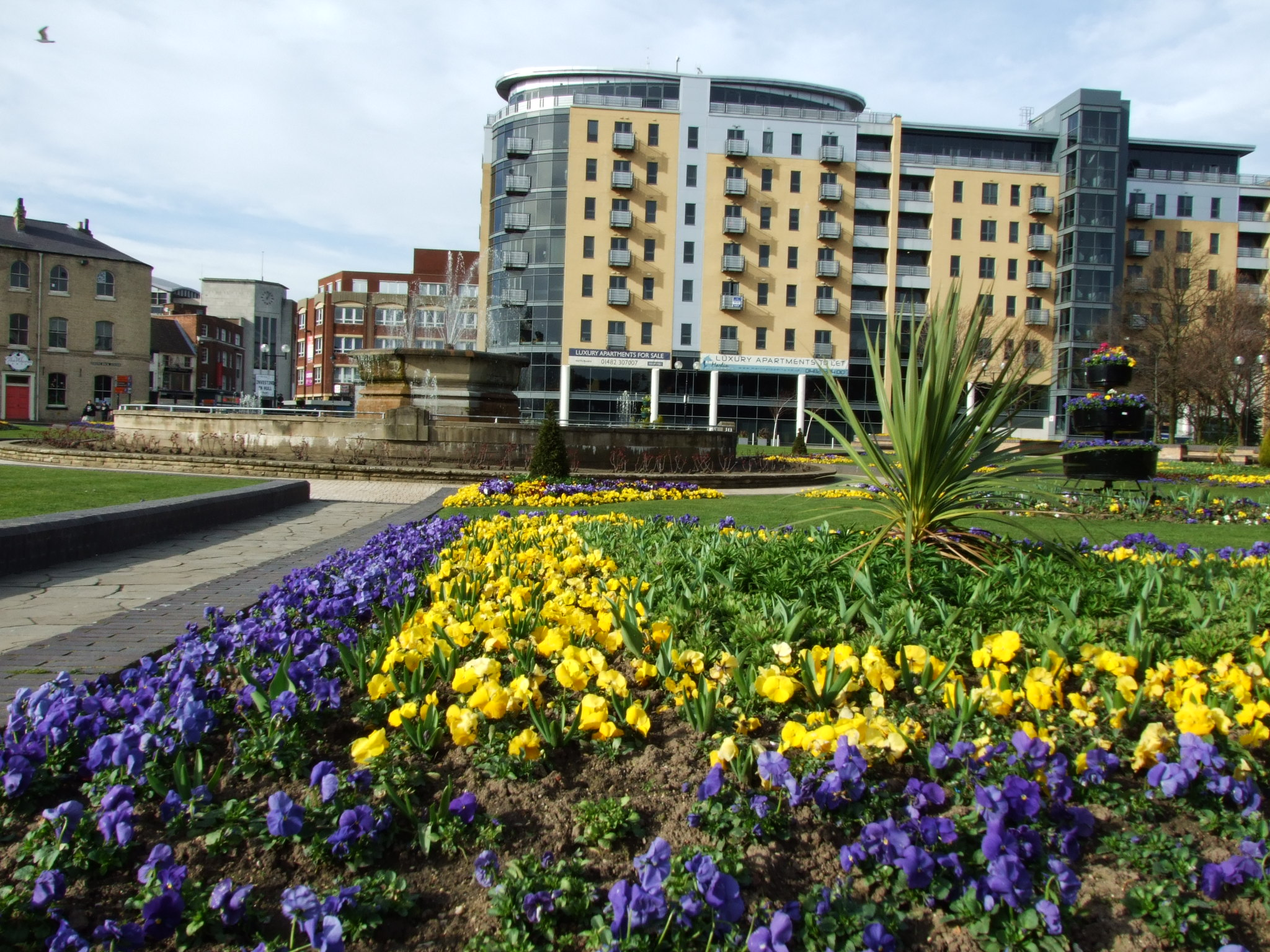
BBC Radio Humberside's headquarters at Queen's Gardens, Hull

In line with the other BBC local stations in the region, BBC Radio Humberside was part of the BBC Night Network when it was formed in May 1989, providing the station with regular all-evening programming, albeit regional rather than local, although prior to this, regional specialist music programming had been aired. Initially, this was a single Saturday evening 45-minute programme consisting of organ music which aired during the winter sports period at 6:45 pm on BBC Radios Leeds, York and Humberside. Then in August 1986 Radio Humberside joined with the other BBC local stations in Yorkshire in broadcasting an early evening service of specialist music programmes. The launch of the BBC Night Network saw regional programmes broadcast nightly from 6.05 pm (6 pm at the weekend) until midnight. In May 1991, local programming was expanded by an hour, continuing until 7 pm. This coincided with the Night Network's expansion to include the BBC's north-west stations, The following year, Night Network programming was extended on weeknights until 12:30 am, and to 1 am by the end of that decade. Prior to the start of regional programming, the station usually stopped broadcasting at around 6 pm and carried BBC Radio 2 at other times.

In 2004, the station moved to a new digital broadcast centre located at Queen's Gardens in Hull, where it was joined by a full TV operation, supporting BBC Look North.

== Awards ==
In May 2012, presenters Beryl Renwick and Betty Smith were awarded the Sony Radio Academy Award for best entertainment programme. Renwick and Smith had presented alongside David Reeves from 2006 to December 2012, after they had been "talent spotted during a tour of the BBC studios in Hull". The pair, aged 86 and 90 respectively, had been the oldest winners of the award. Smith died in November 2014 and Renwick died in September 2015.

In May 2013, the station was named "Station of The Year" at the Sony Radio Academy Awards.

== Studio facilities ==
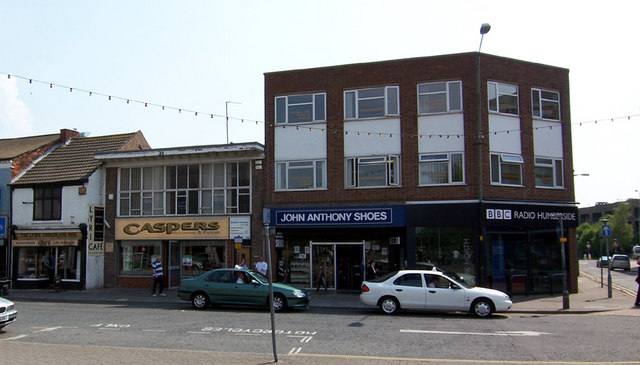
BBC Radio Humberside's former Grimsby studio

BBC Radio Humberside has studios at Queen's Court, Queen's Gardens in Hull. The station also has a second studio, in the Grimsby Institute for Higher Education.

In 2016, BBC Radio Humberside's studios were refurbished as part of the ViLoR programme.

== Technical ==
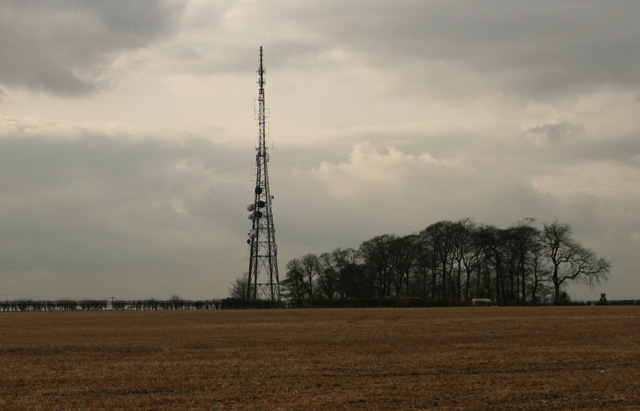
High Hunsley 95.9 FM mast

BBC Radio Humberside broadcasts to East Yorkshire and North Lincolnshire on 95.9 FM (High Hunsley), DAB, Freeview TV channel 713, and online via BBC Sounds.

The FM transmitter is located between Beverley and South Cave 500 ft up on the Yorkshire Wolds is quite powerful over the relatively flat surrounding area.

The DAB signals come from the Bauer Humberside 10D multiplex from three transmitters at Cave Wold (most powerful, three miles south of High Hunsley, and a BT microwave transmitter, Buckton Barn, near Bridlington, and Bevan Flats in Grimsby. There is no FM transmitter on the south bank, but there is a DAB transmitter in Grimsby. AM broadcasts ended in January 2018.

== Jingles ==
In the past, BBC Radio Humberside have used music by David Arnold for their jingles. The first package was written by Paul Hart and performed by Royal Philharmonic Orchestra. In August 2005, the station began using a custom-made package with the BBC Philharmonic Orchestra, produced by S2Blue in Staffordshire. BBC Radio Humberside were responsible for its artistic commissioning and for the eventual shape and construction of the jingles. In 2010, the package was completely refreshed by S2Blue, introducing new rhythm tracks to the 2005 package and new instrumentation across the whole set. David Reeves was the station sound producer with Katy Noone and Neil Rudd providing many of the voice-overs.

== Travel news ==
BBC Radio Humberside carries travel bulletins every 30 minutes (every 15 minutes during Breakfast and Drive) from INRIX Travel Media. Regular traffic presenters include Wayne Foy, Nick Robbins and Ed Sheppard.

== Programming ==
Local programming is produced and broadcast from the BBC's Hull studios from 6 am to 2 pm on Mondays to Fridays and for sports coverage.

Off-peak programming originates from around the country, including the England-wide 10 pm–1 am late show which comes from London or Manchester and the England-wide Sunday evening show.

During the station's overnight downtime, BBC Radio Humberside simulcasts programming from BBC Radio 5 Live.

== Presenters ==
=== Notable current presenters ===
- Peter Swan (Sports Talk, Humberside Sport)

=== Notable former presenters ===
- David Burns (Weekday daytime, Sports Talk, Humberside Sport) Now at 107FM, a community station in Hull.
- Paul Heiney (former reporter for Watchdog)
- Keri Jones
- Peter Levy (presenter of BBC Look North)
- Mike Smartt (later BBC TV News Correspondent and presenter and editor-in-chief BBC News Interactive)
