= BBC Radio Leeds =

Coordinates: 53°47′50.6″N 1°32′01.8″W

- Leeds; England
- Broadcast area: West Yorkshire
- Frequencies: FM: 92.4 MHz (Bradford, Huddersfield & West Yorkshire); FM: 95.3 MHz (Halifax and Wharfedale); FM: 102.7 MHz (Keighley); FM: 103.9 MHz (Leeds); DAB: 12D; Freeview: 711
- RDS: BBCLeeds

Programming
- Language: English
- Format: Local news, talk and music

Ownership
- Owner: BBC Local Radio, BBC Yorkshire

History
- First air date: 24 June 1968
- Former frequencies: 94.6 FM; 774 MW

Technical information
- Licensing authority: Ofcom

Links
- Website: BBC Radio Leeds

BBC Radio Leeds is the BBC's local radio station serving the county of West Yorkshire.

It broadcasts on FM, DAB, digital TV and via BBC Sounds from studios at St Peter's Square in Leeds.

According to RAJAR, the station has a weekly audience of 189,000 listeners as of May 2025.

== History ==
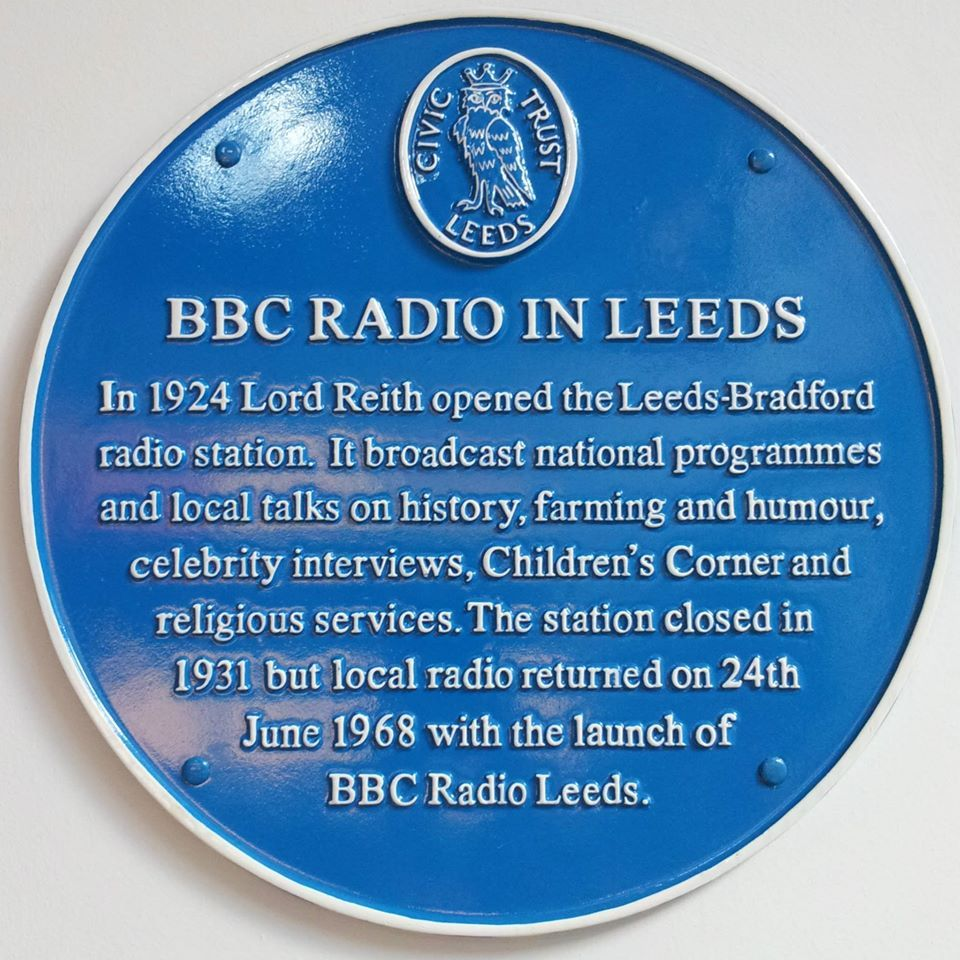
BBC Radio in Leeds blue plaque

The station began broadcasting at the Merrion Centre at 5.30 pm on 24 June 1968, becoming the seventh BBC local radio station to go on air. Initially a two-year experiment and co-funded by Leeds City Council, the station was only available in Leeds on a low powered 50 watt VHF transmitter in Meanwood Park, on 94.6 MHz. Listening figures were very low as at that time, the majority of listeners still listened to radio via AM. In 1970, the station was made permanent and began broadcasting to all of West Yorkshire from the Holme Moss transmitting station and in 1972 the station started broadcasting on medium wave and branded itself as "the voice of West Yorkshire".

In 1974, BBC Radio Leeds, along with BBC Look North, moved to new studios in Woodhouse Lane, where it remained for thirty years until the studios were demolished in 2004.

Until the mid-1980s, the station was generally on air from breakfast until teatime, with any programming after 6 pm devoted to specialist music and magazines aimed at specialist interests and at ethnic minority communities. These programmes did not broadcast all year round, and outside of its broadcast hours, as with all BBC Local Radio stations, Radio Leeds carried BBC Radio 2.

In August 1986, evening programmes began on a permanent basis when the station joined with the other three BBC stations in Yorkshire to provide an early evening service of specialist music programmes on weeknights from 6 pm to 7:30 pm, although since autumn 1984, BBC Radio Leeds' Saturday evening organ music programme, At the Console, had also been carried by BBC Radio York and BBC Radio Humberside. The regional specialist music service was expanded in September 1987, running six days a week (Wednesday to Monday) between 7 pm and 9 pm, with Tuesdays reserved for local sports coverage.

On 29 May 1989, the BBC Night Network launched which saw the six BBC Local Radio stations in Yorkshire and the north east broadcasting networked programming every evening from 6:05 pm (6 pm at the weekend) and midnight, with the majority of the programmes broadcast from the Leeds studios. Any local programming broadcast after 6 pm, such as sport and ethnic minority output, was transmitted only on medium wave with Night Network continuing uninterrupted on FM. The network expanded in May 1991 to include the four BBC North West stations and Night Network's hours were changed, starting an hour later, resulting in an additional hour of local output. Programming was overhauled with specialist music programmes airing from 7:05 pm to 10 pm (the exception being made for midweek sports coverage) followed, on weeknights, by a late show from Lancaster. The late show was extended to 12:30 am a year later and eventually to 1 am. Local programming would now fully opt-out of the network with any local evening programming replacing the scheduled Night Network programme on both FM and AM.

In the late 1980s and early 1990s, the station was branded as "West Yorkshire's FM BBC Radio Leeds"

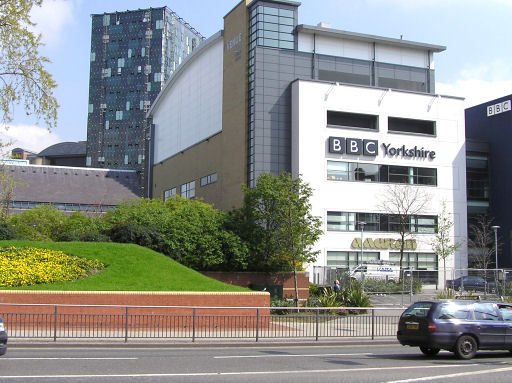
BBC Radio Leeds' main studios are at the BBC Yorkshire buildings on St. Peter's Square in Leeds.

In 2002, the Yorkshire stations left the network to introduce a regional phone-in show with Alex Hall, who had hosted a similar show on Pulse.

In 2012, the station closed its offices and studios at the National Media Museum in Bradford, where the public was able to see programmes being broadcast. Radio Leeds also ran district newsrooms and contribution studios in Wakefield Town Hall, at Dean Clough in Halifax and at Huddersfield Town Hall. Four years later, the station reinstated an office and studio in Bradford, located in the Horton building at The University of Bradford.

As a cost saving measure, all local early evening programmes were scrapped at the start of 2013 and they were replaced by a new evening programme which was broadcast on all local stations (the only time that stations were not able to broadcast the programme was to provide local sports coverage). BBC Radio Leeds was the location of the national programme. The late show was a regional programme. The programme continued until summer 2018, almost a year after the then Director-General of the BBC, Tony Hall, announced in a speech to mark BBC Local Radio's 50th anniversary that the national evening show would be axed, resulting in local programming returning to weeknight evenings.

=== BBC Radio Bradford ===
On 7 December 2020, BBC Radio Bradford began broadcasting as a temporary service on the MW frequency each weekday between 6 am and 2 pm. The service provided eight hours of opt-out programming for listeners in Bradford and the surrounding area each weekday until March 2021.

== Technical ==
The main VHF / FM transmitter is located at the Holme Moss transmitting station on 92.4 MHz, covering most of West Yorkshire.

Radio Leeds is also carried on the Halifax, Wharfedale and Luddenden relay transmitters on 95.3 MHz, from Keighley on 102.7 MHz and from Beecroft Hill (West Leeds) on 103.9 MHz to fill in areas which are screened from Holme Moss by the topology of the area.

Since 2001, BBC Radio Leeds has been carried on the Bauer Leeds DAB multiplex, and since October 2002, on the Bradford & Huddersfield multiplex.

The station also broadcasts on Freeview TV channel 711 in the BBC Yorkshire region and streams online via BBC Sounds.

BBC Radio Leeds was also broadcast on 774 kHz medium wave from a transmitter located at Farnley. It used to simulcast the BBC Asian Network every evening. MW transmissions ended on 1 June 2021.

== Programming ==
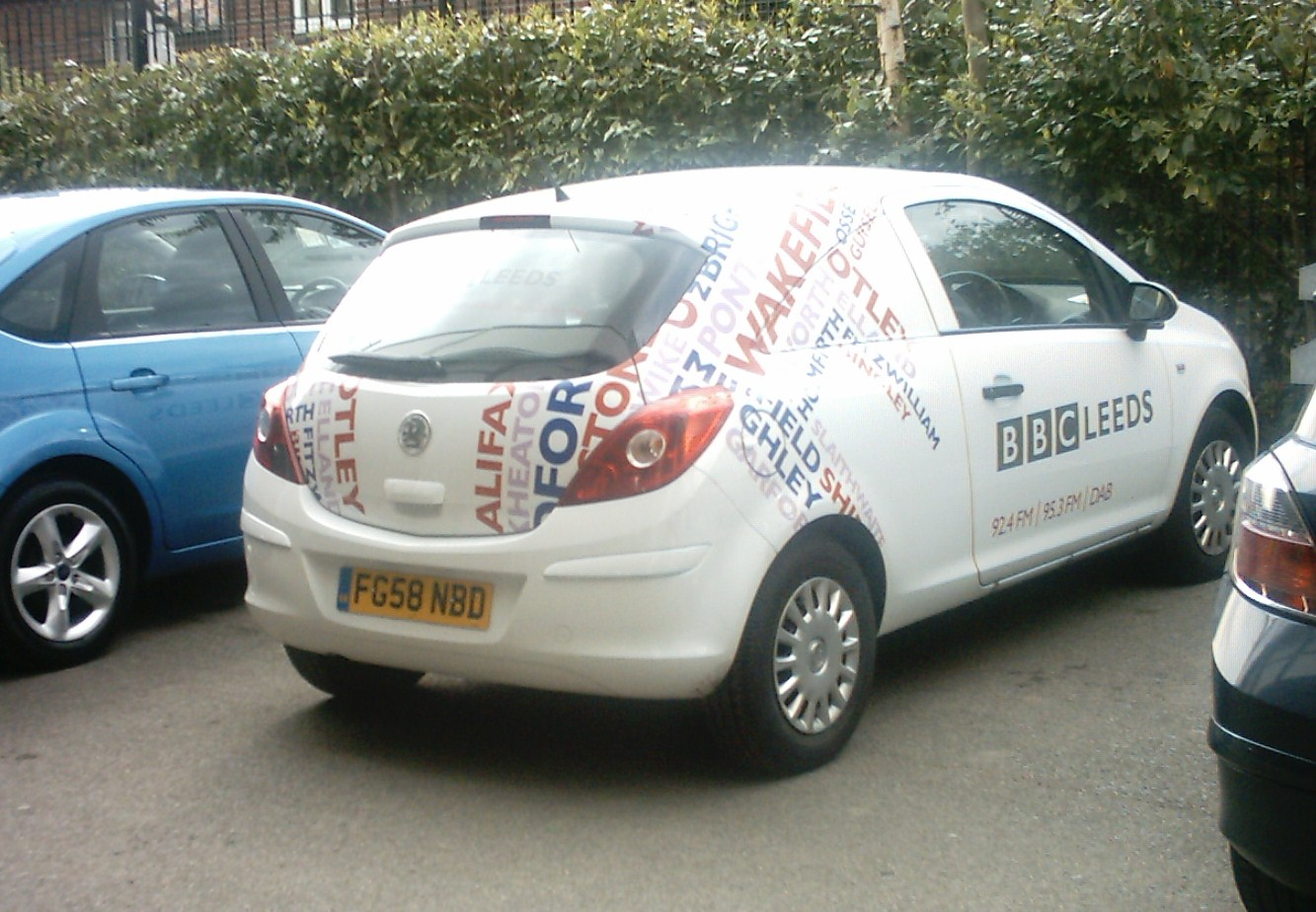
A BBC Radio Leeds vehicle as seen at Headingley during a one-day cricket match in 2009.

Local programming is produced and broadcast from the BBC's Leeds studios from 6 am to 2 pm each day and for sports coverage. The late show, airing from 10 pm to 1 am, is broadcast from Manchester or London.

During the station's downtime, BBC Radio Leeds simulcasts overnight programming from BBC Radio 5 Live.

=== Sports coverage ===
BBC Radio Leeds broadcasts live sport under the West Yorkshire Sport banner. Football coverage includes Leeds United, Huddersfield Town and Bradford City. Rugby league coverage includes Leeds Rhinos, Bradford Bulls, Huddersfield Giants, Wakefield Trinity Wildcats and Castleford Tigers. The station covers Yorkshire Carnegie in rugby union and Yorkshire County Cricket Club in cricket.

== Presenters ==
=== Notable former presenters ===
- Pete Allison
- Liz Green
- Richard Hammond
- Philip Hayton
- John Helm
- Stephanie Hirst
- Martin Kelner
- Peter Levy
