= BBC Yorkshire =

English region of the BBC

- BBC Yorkshire's area within the UK
- TV stations: BBC One
- TV transmitters: Chesterfield; Emley Moor; Oliver's Mount; Tapton Hill
- Radio stations: BBC Radio Leeds; BBC Radio Sheffield; BBC Radio York
- Headquarters: Broadcasting Centre, 2 St Peter's Square, Leeds LS9 8AH
- Area: West Yorkshire; South Yorkshire; North Yorkshire; Derbyshire (Bolsover, eastern High Peak, North East Derbyshire, Chesterfield and northern areas of the Derbyshire Dales); Nottinghamshire (Bassetlaw)
- Nation: BBC English Regions
- Regions: Yorkshire and parts of East Midlands

BBC Yorkshire is one of the English regions of the BBC. It was formed from the division of the former BBC North region into BBC Yorkshire and BBC Yorkshire and Lincolnshire, based in Kingston upon Hull. Serving West, North and South Yorkshire and the north Midlands.

== Services ==
=== Television ===
BBC Yorkshire's television output consists of the flagship regional news service Look North and a 30-minute Sunday morning regional politics show, Politics North.

=== Radio ===
The region is the controlling centre for BBC Radio Leeds, BBC Radio York and BBC Radio Sheffield.

The three stations simulcast networked programming during the evenings and late night.

=== Online and Interactive ===
BBC Yorkshire also produces regional news and local radio pages for BBC Red Button and BBC Local News websites for each county.

== History ==
The regional operation from Leeds began in 1968, when the original BBC North region was broken up into BBC North, BBC North West and BBC North East, with the BBC North name being transferred from Manchester to the new operation in Leeds. The new operation was called BBC North until 2002.

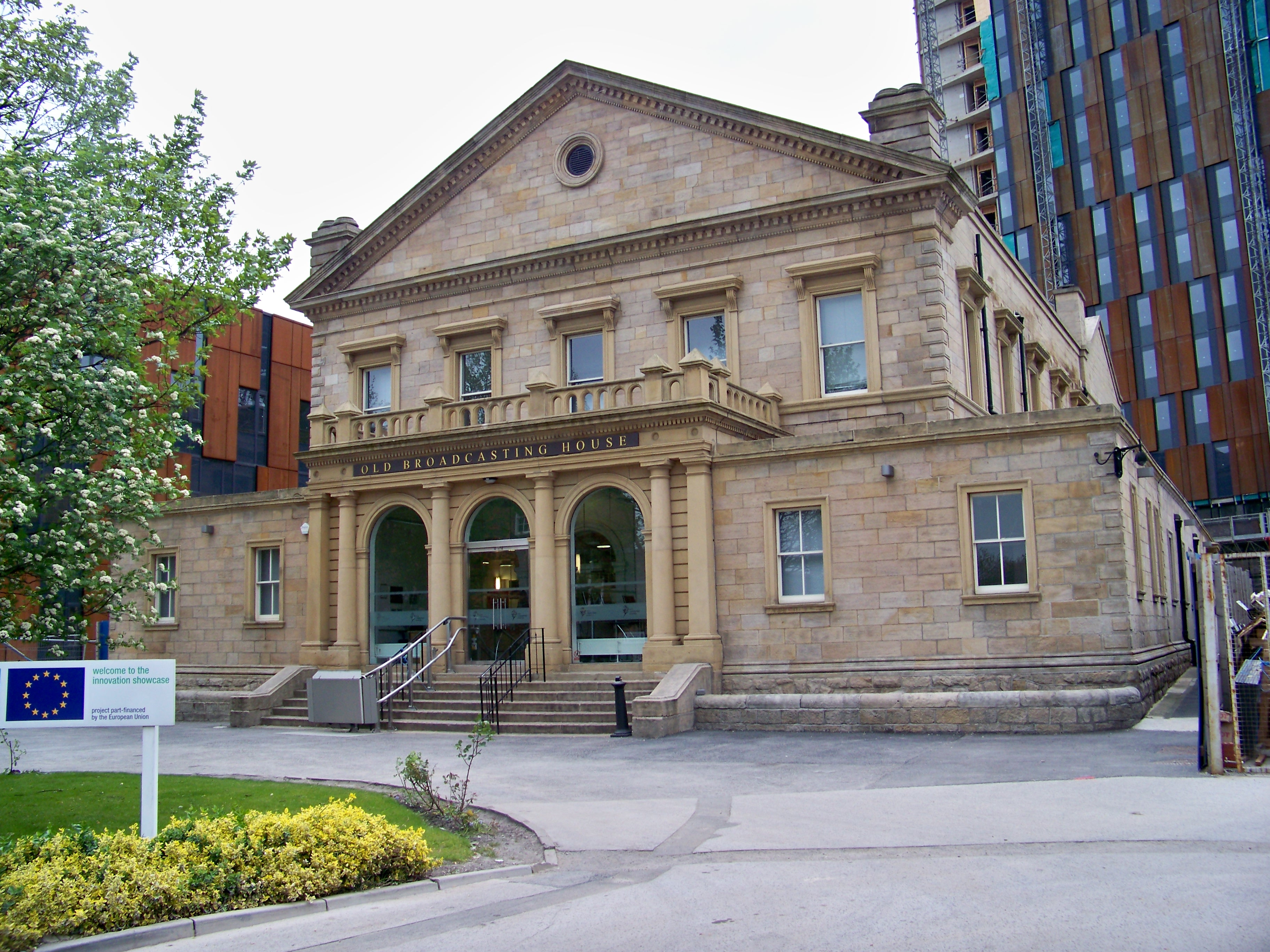
Old Broadcasting House on Woodhouse Lane

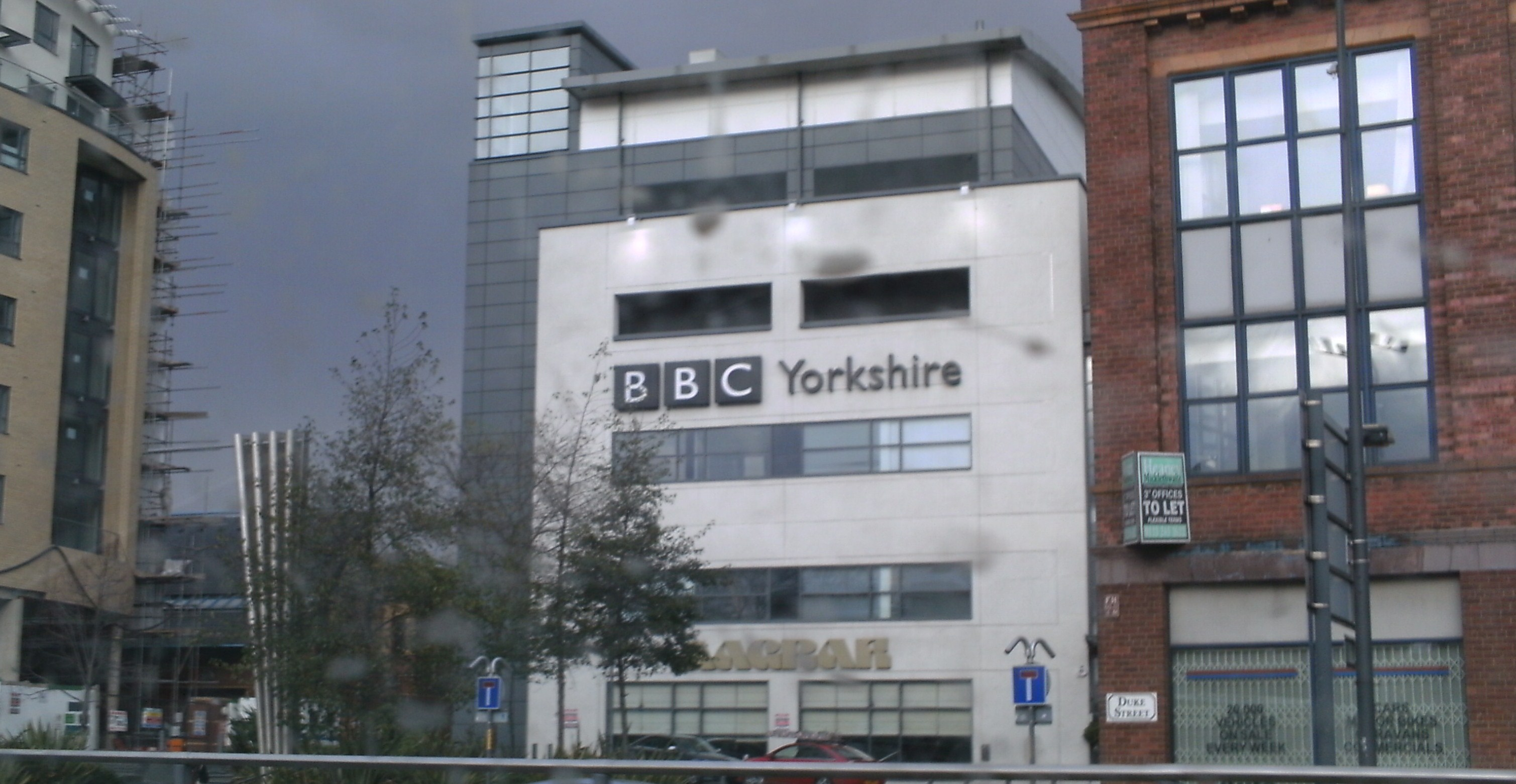
BBC Yorkshire Studio, Leeds

In 2002, viewers on the Belmont transmitter transferred to the BBC Yorkshire and Lincolnshire service, and the service began to use the on-screen name of BBC Yorkshire. This was made official in 2004, when both the Leeds operation, and the East Yorkshire and Lincolnshire operation in Hull, moved into new premises.

== Studios ==
The first Leeds base for BBC North, upon the launch of regional television was a converted studio in All Souls Church, where the service was based until 1974. From then, the television service moved into Old Broadcasting House at Woodhouse Lane, Leeds, where some services such as BBC Radio Leeds had already been broadcasting. This building was originally the Society of Friends' (Quakers') Carlton Hill Meeting House; the building itself was of two ages, one part made of stone with columns, and another made of concrete, and featuring the BBC Coat of arms moulded into the front of the building.

In 2004, however, the equipment required replacing and new premises were built by Birse Group. All of BBC Yorkshire's Leeds-based facilities moved to the new building, located in St. Peter's Square at Quarry Hill, which included state-of-the-art computer systems, new digital studios for BBC Radio Leeds, and new technology that allowed the programme to be broadcast in widescreen.

In addition to St. Peter's Square, BBC Yorkshire also has radio studios and television bureaux located in York and Sheffield.

== See also ==
- BBC English Regions
- BBC Radio Sheffield
- BBC Radio York
- BBC Radio Humberside
- BBC Radio Leeds
