= 2022 in British television =

This is a list of events that took place in 2022 relating to television in the United Kingdom.

== Events ==
=== January ===
Date	Event
1	BBC One airs The Big New Years & Years Eve Party, which sees Olly Alexander of Years & Years joined by Kylie Minogue and the Pet Shop Boys to see out 2021 and welcome in 2022. London's annual fireworks display is also aired at midnight.
1	Among those from the world of film and television to be recognised in the 2022 New Year Honours are Joanna Lumley and Vanessa Redgrave, who are given damehoods, Daniel Craig, who is made a Companion of the Order of St Michael and St George, and soap stars William Roache and June Brown, who become OBEs.
3	Eamonn Holmes joins GB News to co-present their weekday breakfast programme alongside Isabel Webster.
4	ITV's Good Morning Britain returns following a Christmas break to protect its staff against the Omicron variant of Coronavirus.
6	Deborah Turness, a former editor of ITV News and current CEO of ITN, is appointed the BBC's new CEO of news and current affairs, replacing Fran Unsworth.
6	A suggestion by Conservative MP Andrew Rosindell that the BBC should be made to reinstate "God Save the Queen" at the end of daily broadcasts wins the backing of ministers after he raises the matter in the House of Commons. BBC One last played the national anthem at the end of broadcasts in 1997, but stopped doing so upon the launch of the BBC News channel when BBC One instead switched to relaying the news channel through the night.
6	The Apprentice returns to BBC One for its sixteenth series, and for the first time since the Coronavirus pandemic.
7	Grange Hill creator Sir Phil Redmond announces plans for a film version of the long-running school drama series that will reflect the realities of the modern day classroom. The film is due for release in 2023.
8	Anne Diamond joins GB News to present their weekend breakfast programme alongside Stephen Dixon.
8	The 1960s adaptation of Georges Simenon's Inspector Jules Maigret stories makes its Talking Pictures TV debut.
8	Danny Dyer quits EastEnders to accept an offer to appear on a Sky original series. His contract with EastEnders had previously not allowed him to appear on rival networks.
9	Emmerdale actors Isabel Hodgins and Matthew Wolfenden return to filming on the soap following their absence caused by a "race row". The pair were accused of mocking the accent of a mixed-race actress and making an "inappropriate comment".
10	The media regulator Ofcom says it will not launch an inquiry into the ITV series Lorraine following an incorrect statement regarding Coronavirus made in the episode broadcast on 6 December 2021 by Dr Hilary Jones, who had said 90% of Coronavirus hospital patients were unvaccinated. The figure equates to intensive care patients rather than general hospital patients, and a statement correcting this error was made two days later.
10	A new 60-minute discussion-based programme Context is launched. It broadcasts from Mondays to Thursdays on the BBC News Channel and BBC World News and features two guests discussing the day's news.
11	BBC Director-General Tim Davie says a "personal error" led to Alan Dershowitz, the former lawyer of Jeffrey Epstein, being interviewed in December 2021 following the conviction of socialite Ghislaine Maxwell for helping Epstein to groom underage girls.
11	The new £86.7m exterior set of EastEnders is officially unveiled by the BBC replacing the original set built in 1984 and intended to be used for two years. Scenes from the new set will first be seen from the spring.
12–13	David Tag, Andrea Ali and Lysette Anthony leave their roles as Sylver McQueen, Celeste Faroe and Marnie Nightingale from Hollyoaks respectively, following an explosion at Marnie's cafe, killing the three of them.
13	Emmerdale producers Jane Hudson and Laura Shaw have teased the soap's upcoming 50th anniversary celebrations to air on ITV in October 2022 as "epic", with "mind-blowing stunts" and the possible return of past characters with former cast members reprising their roles.
14	News UK have hired Sky News Political Correspondent Kate McCann to become Political Editor at talkTV.
16	Culture Secretary Nadine Dorries says the next announcement about the television licence fee will be the last, and that the time has come to discuss new ways to fund and sell "great British content". The following day she announces that the licence will be frozen at £159 until 2024. At the same time, Dorries also confirms that the Welsh-language TV channel S4C will receive an extra £7.5m per year from the licence fee from April 2022.
18	At 5.59 am, GB News begins a daily broadcast of the national anthem before the start of its live programming.
18	It is revealed that Shama Amin, a contestant on Series 16 of The Apprentice, has quit the show for health reasons, describing taking part in the series as "physically demanding".
19	Amazon Prime announces the title of its upcoming The Lord of the Rings spin-off series, which is to be called The Lord of the Rings: The Rings of Power.
19	A video produced by the campaign group Led By Donkeys, and purporting to show Prime Minister Boris Johnson being questioned about the Partygate scandal by characters from Line of Duty, has received 5 million views since being posted on Twitter the previous day.
20	Aardman Animations animator and creator of Wallace & Gromit, Nick Park announces that a new untitled television film is in development. The new short is planned for release at Christmas 2024 for the BBC.
24	ITV announces plans for a revised weekday evening schedule that will see the ITV Evening News at 6.30 pm extended from 30 to 60 minutes, with greater focus on stories and events outside London. Emmerdale will move from 7 pm to 7.30 pm on weeknights, while Coronation Street will move from six 30-minute episodes to three 60-minute episodes airing on Mondays, Wednesdays and Fridays at 8pm rather than 7.30 pm and 8.30 pm on those days.
26	Regional BBC One HD services launch across Virgin Media platforms in England on channel 101 replacing the SD version meaning viewers can now watch regional news in HD for the first time without having to switch over to the now defunct 108 national HD channel.
26	A new regional programme for England launches on BBC One. Called We Are England, the programme chooses a subject and produces six editions tailored for six different pan-regional areas of England. The series replaces Inside Out which ended last year.
28	Ofcom launches an investigation into the prolonged outage of subtitles on Channel 4 during 2021.
31	BBC Three controller Fiona Campbell announces plans to launch a new soap opera for the channel.

=== February ===
Date	Event
1	BBC Three relaunches as a television channel six years after becoming an online service.
5	It is reported that Channel 5 are considering pulling their funding from Neighbours, an Australian soap opera that the channel co-produce with Fremantle Australia. The lack of funding would result in the soap facing cancellation or looking for alternate funding.
6	Channel 5 confirms reports that it will stop showing Neighbours from August. Australia's Network 10, which airs the series in Australia, says it will seek to find a new UK partner to keep the series on air as Neighbours relies on UK funding for its continued production.
7	Channel 4 announces that in a global first 100% of its on-air team for the 2022 Beijing Paralympics will be disabled. Presenters include Ade Adepitan, Arthur Williams, Billy Monger and Sean Rose.
8	ITV airs the 2022 Brit Awards, the first Brit Awards ceremony to be held without gender-related categories. Adele, who wins several awards on the night, makes a rare live appearance at the ceremony and offers her thoughts on the new nominations categories.
8	Gobstopper TV, production company of Just Tattoo of Us cuts ties with ViacomCBS (now Paramount Global) following an investigation into bullying.
9	Amazon Prime have signed a multi-million pound long-term deal with the Shepperton Studios for exclusive use of new production facilities.
10	Channel 4 announces that new episodes of Hollyoaks will premiere on streaming service All 4 the morning prior to their evening television broadcast.
12	Channel 4 airs the first free-to-air Super League rugby match (a game between Warrington and Leeds) after signing a two-year deal with the Rugby Football League that will see ten matches broadcast by the channel during 2022.
12	Natalie Imbruglia wins the third series of The Masked Singer disguised as Panda. Overnight viewing figures show that the final was watched by 7.31 million viewers.
13	The Duchess of Cambridge reads a CBeebies Bedtime Story, making her the latest celebrity to do so. She reads The Owl Who Was Afraid of the Dark by Jill Tomlinson to mark Children's Mental Health Week.
14	Virgin Media removes all of the standard definition versions of all BBC channels, apart from BBC Parliament as it currently does not broadcast in high definition.
15	A mural commissioned by the BBC to mark the final series of Peaky Blinders appears in Birmingham, and reveals the start date of the series as 27 February.
15	Singers Brian McFadden and Keith Duffy lend their support to a campaign to save Neighbours when they raise the subject during an appearance on 5 News.
16	Gemma Collins fronts the Channel 4 documentary Gemma Collins: Self-Harm & Me, based around her history with self-harm and her mental health.
17	Sarah Smith, the recently appointed BBC News North America Editor, has said she feels relieved to have left her job as Scotland Editor after enduring what she describes as years of misogynistic "bile and hatred" while covering Scottish politics.
18	Producers of the BBC's MasterChef announce production of the programme will move to Birmingham from 2024.
18	As the UK is affected by Storm Eunice, the YouTube channel Big Jet TV, which shows livestreamed footage of aeroplanes landing, receives 5.5 million viewers throughout the day, with a peak of 238,000 at one point; the channel usually receives around 100,000 daily views.
18	Pre-school cookery show, Big Cook, Little Cook announces a return after 16 years (last airing prior to this series in 2006). Ibinabo Jack stars as Big Cook Jen and Courtney Bowman as Little Cook Small in this 50-episode revival previously fronted by Steve Marsh and Dan Wright.
21	The BBC One magazine programme Morning Live moves to studios in Manchester as part of the BBC's drive to produce more content outside London.
21	GB News presenter Dan Wootton launches The Lockdown Inquiry as part of his Dan Wootton Tonight show in which he looks at the impact of Coronavirus lockdowns in the United Kingdom.
21	The BBC announces a revision to the broadcast schedules for flagship soaps Doctors and EastEnders. The change, set to take place from 7 March, will include repeats of daytime soap Doctors being shown on BBC Two at 7:00 pm, as well as EastEnders moving to a permanent slot of 7:30 pm on BBC One from Monday to Thursday. The change marks firsts for both soaps, with Doctors receiving its first primetime slot (since a brief trial period in mid-2000) and EastEnders being permanently broadcast on a Wednesday for the first time.
22	Jon Sopel and Emily Maitlis announce they are leaving the BBC to join Global Radio, where they will front a podcast for Global and present a show together on LBC.
22	Professional dancer Oti Mabuse announces she is leaving Strictly Come Dancing after seven years with the show.
23	Amid the ongoing crisis between Russia and Ukraine, the UK government asks the media regulator Ofcom to review RT UK's output.
24	Following Russia's invasion of Ukraine, organisers of the Eurovision Song Contest say that Russia will be allowed to participate in the 2022 contest as Eurovision is a "non-political cultural event". However, they reverse this decision a day later by disqualifying Russia, and saying that its inclusion would bring the contest into disrepute "in light of the unprecedented crisis in Ukraine", Prime Minister Boris Johnson makes his final televised address as the Prime Minister on the War in Ukraine for the first time in 19 years since Tony Blair made his televised address on the War in Iraq in 2003.
24	Former Scottish First Minister Alex Salmond suspends his talk show on RT UK following Russia's invasion of Ukraine and pressure for him to do so.
25	Roisin and Joe from Glasgow make their Gogglebox debut, becoming the first Scottish family to appear in the series for six years.
27	Peaky Blinders returns for its sixth series, with the opening episode dedicated to the memory of Helen McCrory who played the role of Polly Gray in the series.
28	Ofcom launches 15 separate investigations into RT UK for its coverage of the Russian invasion of Ukraine.
28	Following the Russian invasion of Ukraine, Compare the Market announces that it will avoid showing its adverts featuring the character Aleksandr Orlov near news on the invasion to ensure sensitivity.

=== March ===
Date	Event
3	RT UK is removed from all broadcast platforms in the UK as part of a Europe-wide crackdown on Russian propaganda.
3	After failing to secure another British broadcaster to finance the series, producers of Neighbours confirm production of the Australian soap will end in the summer.
5	It is reported that Sky News correspondent Stuart Ramsay was shot and wounded by a Russian reconnaissance unit while covering the war in Ukraine on 28 February.
5	The BBC temporarily suspends its journalists' work in Russia in response to a new law that threatens to imprison anyone deemed to have spread "fake" news about the country's armed forces, but Russian news will continue to be produced from outside Russia. The service is restored three days later on 8 March.
7	Ofcom rules that the BBC made a "significant mistake" in a television news report during which Sarah Smith incorrectly stated that former Scottish First Minister Alex Salmond had said he believed his successor, Nicola Sturgeon, should resign. The error was not acknowledged and corrected on air.
7	BBC Two begins repeating episodes of Doctors at 7:00 pm, while EastEnders moves to its permanent slot of 7:30 pm.
7	ITV starts airing the ITV Evening News at the extended time of 6:30 pm to 7:30 pm, while Emmerdale spans from 7:30 pm to 8:00 pm and Coronation Street at 8:00 pm to 9:00 pm on Mondays, Wednesdays and Fridays.
7	S4C announce the appointment of Llinos Griffin-Williams as their first Chief Content Officer and Geraint Evans as Director of Content and Publishing Strategy.
8	Coronation Street production designer Rosie Mullins-Hoyle announces a new exterior extension of its Trafford Wharf set of a new 7.7 acre site. Weatherfield Precinct will be based on 1960s architecture which will include new local shops, a piazza, maisonettes, balconies and a staircase which is due to be completed in six months time.
8	Channel 4 airs a special episode of soap Hollyoaks in celebration of International Women's Day. The episode opens with a "time hop" to the 1950s to see how the treatment of women has changed, later showcasing the current treatment of women in the 2020s.
9	ITV confirms plans to extend the Coronation Street set to include the Weatherfield Precinct shopping complex. Building work on the project will begin shortly and is expected to last for six months.
10	Sam Ryder is chosen to represent the United Kingdom in the 2022 Eurovision Song Contest with his song "Space Man".
13	The 75th British Academy Film Awards are held in London, the first fully in-person ceremony to take place since 2020.
17	The BBC has paid damages to Patrick Jephson, the former private secretary to Diana, Princess of Wales, for the "harm caused to him" over Martin Bashir's 1995 Panorama interview.
18	Ofcom revokes the UK broadcasting licence for Russian state backed news channel Russia Today "with immediate effect" because its parent company is not "fit and proper to hold a UK broadcast licence".
18	Zoe Ball, Kylie Minogue and Joel Dommett are forced to pull out of the Red Nose Day 2022 event after testing positive for COVID-19. The Red Nose Day broadcast, aired by the BBC, raises £42.7m by the end of the evening.
18	Top Boy returns for a fourth series on Netflix, the second series produced following the show's return in 2019.
24	Former BBC chairman Lord Michael Grade is appointed as the next chairman of Ofcom.
24	Harpreet Kaur wins series 16 of The Apprentice.
27	Regan Gascoigne and Karina Manta win the fourteenth series of Dancing on Ice.
28	Laura Kuenssberg is to replace Andrew Marr as presenter of BBC One's flagship Sunday morning politics show from September.
28	BBC TV programming is taken off air on terrestrial television in Afghanistan after the Taliban ordered local television channels not to show international content. Affected are the BBC's Pashto, Uzbek and Persian services, which can now only be viewed by Afghans with satellite television.
28	Professional dancer Aljaž Škorjanec confirms he is leaving Strictly Come Dancing after almost a decade with the show.
29	Medical drama Holby City airs its final episode after 23 years.
29	Concert for Ukraine, a two-hour fundraising event organised by ITV, Livewire Pictures, Global Radio and the Disasters Emergency Committee (DEC), takes place in Birmingham. By the end of the evening, £11.3 million has been raised for the DEC's Ukraine appeal.
29	Footage of an in-depth television interview Sir Terry Wogan recorded with a BBC South reporter has been unearthed by a BBC archivist. The recording, made in 1980, sees Wogan speak candidly about his life and career. Much of the footage remained unused, but is to be made available through BBC Sounds as part of a documentary marking the 50th anniversary of Wogan's first BBC Radio 2 breakfast show from 1 April, as well as airing on Radio 2.
30	Channel 5 reaches the 25th anniversary of its first day on air.
31	The first episode of The Ministry of Offence, a weekly panel show for GB News, is live in London.
31	Netflix announce that Top Boy will return for a third and final series (fifth overall), with filming set to start in the summer.

=== April ===
Date	Event
4	Newsround celebrates 50 years on air, having been first broadcast on 4 April 1972.
4	The UK government announces it has decided to go ahead with plans to privatise Channel 4. The decision is criticised by celebrities associated with the channel, including Matt Lucas and Kirstie Allsopp.
4	BBC Breakfast presenter Dan Walker announces he is leaving the BBC to join Channel 5.
4	The evening's episode of EastEnders is dedicated to the memory of actress June Brown following her death the previous day. Afterwards, the documentary June Brown: A Walford Legend, which originally aired in 2017, to celebrate Brown's 90th birthday, and her 2011 episode of Who Do You Think You Are?, are aired on BBC One, in a change to the original schedule.
7	Following a ruling at Belfast Crown Court, the BBC is to hand over footage collected for Spotlight On The Troubles: A Secret History, its documentary series about the Troubles to police.
8	Richard Osman announces his departure as co-presenter on Pointless to focus more on his writing career, although he will still co-present on Pointless Celebrities on a limited contract before leaving permanently. A selection of guest co-presenters will be featured on both series until a replacement is found. Osman's departure does not affect his other show House of Games.
11	The Welsh Government is criticised for spending £32,000 on Unlocked: Coronavirus Stories from Wales, a 10-episode podcast in which First Minister Mark Drakeford defends his record on dealing with the pandemic.
11	Veteran quiz contestant Alice Walker wins the 2022 series of Mastermind.
12	Newcastle will host the first BBC Comedy Festival, it is confirmed. The festival will take place over three days during May.
12	ITV News Central presenter Bob Warman announces plans to retire after 50 years of presenting news bulletins for ITV in the Midlands. His last edition of Central News will be on Monday 4 July.
13	The BBC appoints Chris Mason as its new Political Editor, succeeding Laura Kuenssberg.
14	The BBC launches Doctor Who: Redacted on BBC Sounds, the first Doctor Who series to be written by and feature a transgender character.
17	A trailer following Easter Sunday's Doctor Who special reveals that the characters Tegan and Ace will join Jodie Whittaker's Thirteenth Doctor for her final adventure when she leaves the series in the autumn.
18	A study carried out by research company Kantar indicates the rising cost of living in Britain has led to households cancelling their streaming subscriptions, with 1.51 million subscriptions cancelled in the first three months of 2022.
18	As he prepares to launch his Piers Morgan Uncensored show for TalkTV, Piers Morgan describes his 2021 exit from ITV's Good Morning Britain as "a farce" that "focused everyone's minds" on free speech.
19	At Basildon Crown Court, former EastEnders actress Katie Jarvis (who played Hayley Slater in the series) pleads guilty to racially aggravated harassment and common assault after an incident in Essex in July 2020. She subsequently receives a two-year community order.
19	Britain's Got Talent defends its decision to allow two previously known acts (singer Loren Allred and comedian Axel Blake) through to the semi-finals following criticism from viewers.
19	ITV airs a special Coronation Street documentary to celebrate William Roache as he reaches his 90th birthday.
20	A proposed update to The Highway Code will allow drivers of self-driving cars to watch television on an inbuilt screen while the vehicle is moving, but they will be required to take back control when prompted to do so.
22	During an edition of the GB News lunchtime discussion programme To the Point and while discussing her experience with scammers, comedian Francine Lewis surprises her fellow panellists by claiming to have recently discovered her husband of 17 years has been having an extramarital affair. Her comments are received positively on social media.
25	Launch of TalkTV with a limited television output and a daytime schedule mostly simulcast from TalkRadio. The launch night includes the first edition of Piers Morgan Uncensored featuring an appearance by former US President Donald Trump. The launch receives a mixed reception from critics, while overnight viewing figures indicate the first edition of Piers Morgan Uncensored was watched by 317,000 viewers. Audience figures also show talkTV outperforming GB News for the debut edition of Piers Morgan Uncensored (aired at 8pm), but with higher figures for GB News for the night as a whole.
26	BBC Three airs the documentary Tim Westwood: Abuse of Power in which several women allege that DJ Tim Westwood committed sexual misconduct and abused his position in the music industry. Westwood steps down from his Capital Xtra programme the following day "until further notice".
26	TalkTV have hired Sarah Hewson as their Royal Correspondent.
28	The UK government announces plans to publish a new Broadcasting white paper that will include measures to better protect viewers of streaming services from harmful content. Ofcom will be given the power to rule on new content standards and be given new regulatory powers over online content.
28	The Prince of Wales and Duchess of Cornwall take a tour of the BBC's London headquarters, where they meet journalists.
29	TalkRadio presenter Jeremy Kyle confirms he will present a primetime programme on TalkTV, marking his return to television.
29	ITV announces that Martin Hancock is returning to Coronation Street, reprising his role as Spider Nugent after 19 years away.
29	Channel 4 announces that Derry Girls will end with an additional final 45 minute special episode The Agreement set a year later during 1998 and the signing of The Good Friday Agreement.
30	Media reports suggest that Jason Donovan and Kylie Minogue will reprise their Neighbours roles as Scott and Charlene Robinson for the soap's final episode on 1 August, with filming for their scenes having taken place in Melbourne's Vermont South suburb. Their return is subsequently confirmed by the show's executive producer, Jason Herbison.

=== May ===
Date	Event
1	Lord Michael Grade takes up his role as chairman of Ofcom.
3	Countdown presenter Anne Robinson announces she is to leave the programme in the summer after a year in the role.
3	Paramount+ have signed a deal with Comcast and Sky to launch in the UK and Ireland on 22 June.
3	Ratings for Piers Morgan Uncensored have dropped dramatically since its launch night, with viewership so low for at least half of the evening's show that no audience figures are recorded. The following evening's edition has an average of 62,000 viewers, a significant fall from the programme's opening night when 316,000 viewers tuned in.
5	Channel 4 publishes its alternative plans for going forward were it not to be privatised.
5	Eddie Scott wins the 2022 series of MasterChef.
6	TV chef Dave Myers, who is one half of the Hairy Bikers, has revealed he is taking a break from filming and public appearances while he undergoes chemotherapy following a cancer diagnosis.
7	The BBC confirms it will stage the first Proms concert to be dedicated to video gaming during the 2022 Proms season.
8	Actress and Strictly Come Dancing winner Rose Ayling-Ellis becomes the first celebrity to sign a CBeebies bedtime story by reading Can Bears Ski? by Raymond Antrobus to mark Deaf Awareness Week.
8	Rwandan-Scottish actor Ncuti Gatwa is named by the BBC as the Fourteenth Doctor, succeeding Jodie Whittaker; he will make his Doctor Who debut in 2023.
9	The Scottish Football Writers' Association apologises after television presenter Eilidh Barbour walked out of a gala dinner in Glasgow along with other guests in protest at an awards speech one guest described as "sexist, racist and homophobic".
11	Channel 5 airs the documentary Madeleine McCann: The Case Against Christian B, which alleges the abductor of Madeleine McCann will escape detection because German police have identified the wrong suspect.
11	Channel 4 strikes a deal to air 1,000 hours of their shows on YouTube for free.
12	Various media outlets confirm that Warner Bros. Discovery and the BT Group are to form a joint-venture, in-which BT Sport will merge into Discovery's Eurosport division.
14	Health campaigners have criticised UK government plans to postpone legislation to restrict pre-watershed advertising of junk food and 2 for 1 offers in supermarkets for a year because of the cost of living crisis.
14	Kalush Orchestra, representing Ukraine, wins the 2022 Eurovision Song Contest with their entry, "Stefania". Sam Ryder, representing the United Kingdom, finishes in second place, the best result for the UK since 1998. The contest is watched by an average audience of 9 million, with a peak audience of 10.6 million.
15	David Tennant and Catherine Tate are to return to their Doctor Who roles as the Tenth Doctor and Donna Noble for the show's 60th anniversary in 2023.
16	Yasmin Finney has been cast in Doctor Who for the 60th anniversary in 2023.
16	The evening's edition of Piers Morgan Uncensored attracts some media attention after an anonymous guest uses the c-word to describe Morgan during a debate about transgender women in sport.
17	Dan Walker presents his final edition of BBC Breakfast after being with the programme for six years.
18	The High Court rules that the BBC can publish a story about a man it says exploited his status as an MI5 informant to abuse his partner, but the individual cannot be named.
19	Secretary of State for Culture Nadine Dorries has criticised Channel 4 News for not doing itself "any favours" in regard to impartiality, but any suggestion of a vendetta against Channel 4 being the reason for its privatisation is "laughable".
19	The Sun reports that UKTV are in talks to produce a reboot of The Bill, which could air in 2023.
19	The previous evening's edition of Piers Morgan Uncensored is reported to have attracted 10,000 viewers, a significant fall on the number who tuned in when the programme was launched on 25 April.
20	Bruno Tonioli announces he is leaving Strictly Come Dancing. His place on the judging panel will be taken by Anton Du Beke.
20	ITV announce that for the eighth series of Love Island, clothes will be sourced from eBay rather than their previous fashion sponsor I Saw It First, who provided contestants with clothing and accessories. Due to receiving criticism for "encouraging a disposable attitude to fashion", executive producer Mike Spencer said: "we strive to be a more eco-friendly production with more focus on ways in which we can visibly show this on screen".
23	Arqiva have carried out an inspection of 48 transmitting masts following the Bilsdale transmitter fire in August 2021.
23	BBC weather presenter Carol Kirkwood reveals she is engaged live on air during BBC Breakfast.
23	ITV has announced that the Inspector Morse prequel crime drama Endeavour would end after nine series.
24	An edition of Panorama covering the Partygate affair alleges that people crowded together, sat on each other's laps and mocked those anxious about Coronavirus at events held during lockdowns in 2020 and 2021. The programme also alleges that Prime Minister Boris Johnson asked civil servant Sue Gray to scrap her report, although this is denied by Downing Street.
24	The BBC apologises after a message reading "Manchester United are rubbish" appeared on the BBC News Channel's news ticker during an item about tennis. The incident is attributed to someone who was learning how to operate the news ticker and "writing random things".
26	BBC Director-General Tim Davie announces plans to make annual savings of £500m that will see the content of BBC Four and the CBBC channel moving to an online-only service, while BBC Radio 4 Extra will also go online. However, they will continue to be available through television platforms for at least the next three years. The BBC News Channel and BBC World News will also merge to become one news service.
26	French biscuit firm LU have recruited Fred Sirieix to launch their first UK marketing campaign titled "Taste the Love".
29	To coincide with the Platinum Jubilee of Elizabeth II, BBC One airs Elizabeth: The Unseen Queen, a 75-minute documentary showing private family videos of the Queen as a young girl.
31	An inquest into the death of Emmerdale actor Andy Devine concludes he died from "hospital-acquired pneumonia" following a fall.

=== June ===
Date	Event
1	Among those from the world of television to be recognised in the 2022 Birthday Honours are actor Damian Lewis who becomes a CBE, broadcaster and sports presenter Clare Balding who is made an OBE, and BBC Wales weather presenter Derek Brockway (nicknamed Derek the Weather) who receives a British Empire Medal. The former Secretary of State for Culture Maria Miller receives a Damehood.
2	The Prince of Wales and Duchess of Cornwall make a guest appearance in an episode of EastEnders when they join residents celebrating the Platinum Jubilee of Elizabeth II.
4	BBC One airs the Platinum Party at the Palace to celebrate the Platinum Jubilee of Elizabeth II. Acts on the bill include Diana Ross, Queen and Adam Lambert, Duran Duran and Sir Rod Stewart. The concert opens with a pre-recorded sketch of Elizabeth II and Paddington Bear acting together, and both tapping teaspoons on their cups to Queen's "We Will Rock You". Overnight viewing figures indicate the broadcast had an average audience of 11.2 million, with a peak audience of 13.4 million tuning in.
6	TalkTV airs a two-hour special of Piers Morgan Uncensored to cover that day's Conservative Party vote of confidence in the leadership of Boris Johnson.
6–11	Hollyoaks airs a week episodes filmed in Mallorca that feature the death of long-term regular character Luke Morgan (Gary Lucy).
9	Sue Barker announces her retirement from her role as the presenter of the BBC's Wimbledon coverage after the 2022 tournament.
10	BBC Northern Ireland confirms it will not resume live television coverage of the Twelfth of July parade in Belfast.
10	Neighbours has filmed its final scene after 37 years of production, with former stars including Kylie Minogue, Jason Donovan and Guy Pearce returning for the show's finale.
11	The 2022 British Soap Awards air, returning to ITV for the first time since 2019. Emmerdale are named Best British Soap with cast member Paige Sandhu taking Best Leading Performer. Emmerdale tie with EastEnders at four awards each.
13	The BBC unveils its new-look news studios which will be used for BBC News at Six, BBC News at Ten and London bulletins. The studio is first seen as Huw Edwards presents the BBC News at Ten.
14	Russia publishes a list of UK journalists and public figures who it has banned from entering Russia in response to sanctions against that country. The list includes journalists working for the BBC, Sky, Channel 4 and Channel 5.
14	GB News confirms it will air coverage of the Twelfth of July parade from Belfast after the BBC decided not to broadcast the event. Former Northern Ireland First Minister Arlene Foster will present coverage of the parade.
17	The BBC is reported to be in talks with the European Broadcasting Union to potentially host the 2023 Eurovision Song Contest in the UK after an assessment by the EBU concluded it would not be feasible for the contest to take place in Ukraine because of the ongoing conflict there.
20	Ofcom finds Channel 4 in breach of its broadcast licence conditions after subtitles, signing or audio description were absent for several weeks following a fire at a broadcast centre in 2021.
22	Paramount+ launches in the UK and Ireland.
22	Former Daily Mirror editor Richard Wallace is appointed Head of TV at talkTV.
22	As talkTV continues to struggle with low viewing figures, News UK chief executive Rebekah Brooks tells staff she is "confident" the channel's ratings will grow, but that streaming and online video content are more important.
29	Keith Lemon announces that his ITV2 panel show Celebrity Juice has been axed after fourteen years.
30	EastEnders confirms Matthew Morrison is to join the cast as Felix Baker, also known by his stage name Tara Misu, and the soap's first drag queen character.
30	Forces TV closes down after 8 years on air which is due to the direct result of the loss of the channel's Freeview slot on the COM7 multiplex platform.

=== July ===
Date	Event
1	Channel 5 confirms the hour-long finale of Neighbours will air at 9pm on Friday 29 July.
4	Bob Warman presents his final edition of ITV News Central after 50 years with ITV.
8	The BBC confirms that Jon Kay has been appointed as the new regular BBC Breakfast presenter from Mondays to Wednesdays with immediate effect, while Victoria Derbyshire will become joint lead presenter of Newsnight alongside Kirsty Wark from September.
8	The BBC confirms that Shane Richie will return to EastEnders to reprise his role as Alfie Moon in the autumn.
11	The BBC announce four new professional dancers have been cast for the twentieth series of Strictly Come Dancing; Vito Coppola, Carlos Gu, Lauren Oakley and Michelle Tsiakkas.
11	It is announced that for the first time ever on the series, Love Island will have a contestant return, when Adam Collard, who was a contestant on series 4, returns on Day 36 of series 8.
11	Ackley Bridge returns for series 5, at the revised timeslot of 10pm. Megan Morgan replaces Carla Woodcock in the role of Marina Dobson. New characters include Kyle Dobson, played by Adam Little and Asma Farooqi, played by Laila Zaidi.
12	GB News airs coverage of the Twelfth of July parades in Northern Ireland. The event, presented by former Northern Ireland First Minister Arlene Foster, their Northern Ireland correspondent Dougie Beattie and former Coronation Street actor Charles Lawson draws a peak audience of 98,000 viewers. The coverage is described as "unfocused and amateurish" by the Belfast Telegraph.
13	BBC One airs The Real Mo Farah, a documentary in which athlete Mo Farah reveals how he was trafficked to the UK as a child.
13	Dedicated evening continuity for BBC One viewers in Northern England launches but it is accompanied by any additional north-specific programming, and there is special on-screen BBC North branding.
14	The BBC sets out plans for a new news channel titled BBC News to replace its two existing news services for the UK and overseas, and scheduled to launch in April 2023. One of its programmes will be a simulcast of Nicky Campbell's daily BBC Radio 5 Live programme.
15	Channel 4 hosts the first of the July 2022 Conservative Party leadership election televised debates featuring five candidates – Kemi Badenoch, Penny Mordaunt, Rishi Sunak, Liz Truss and Tom Tugendhat.
15	Channel 4 says an investigation into claims made by Culture Secretary Nadine Dorries that parts of its 2010 reality series Tower Block of Commons were faked have found no evidence of the allegations. Dorries was one of several MPs who took part in the show, and had made the claims in May.
17	ITV hosts the second televised debate for the 2022 Conservative Party leadership election.
18	The House of Lords Communications and Digital Committee publishes a report looking into the future of BBC funding, highlighting the need for the BBC to define its future role more clearly, including setting out options for future funding.
18	Sky News cancels the planned third Conservative leadership televised debate, scheduled for the following day, after Rishi Sunak and Liz Truss declined to participate.
18	The BBC announces plans to make large amounts of its archive content available through the BBC Rewind website to celebrate its centenary.
19	Domestic abuse charity Women's Aid says it has spoken to ITV about "misogynistic and controlling behaviour" on the reality television series Love Island after being compelled to do so following a number of tags it has received on social media about the series.
20	Ofcom reveals it has received 3,617 complaints about Love Island in a week, most of them about alleged misogynistic behaviour by male contestants.
20	BBC One airs England's UEFA Women's Euro 2022 quarter final match against Spain which results in a 2–1 win for England in extra time. The match is watched by an audience of over nine million, the figures made up of 7.6 million television viewers along with a further 1.5 million watching on BBC iPlayer. It is the competition's largest audience to date.
21	The BBC is to pay damages to Tiggy Legge-Bourke, the former nanny to Princes William and Harry after allegations made against her to obtain an interview for the 1995 Panorama episode "An Interview with HRH The Princess of Wales".
22	Bobby Brazier, son of the late Jade Goody, is to join EastEnders as the character Freddie Slater, it is announced, with him making his debut in the autumn.
24	Neighbours releases a 40-second trailer of its final episode. It is also confirmed that Margot Robbie will reprise her role as Donna Freedman for the series finale.
25	It is confirmed that the 2023 Eurovision Song Contest will be held in the UK as Ukraine is unable to host it because of the ongoing conflict with Russia.
25	BBC One airs Our Next Prime Minister, a debate featuring the final two candidates in the Conservative Party leadership election.
25	Piers Morgan Uncensored begins a week of editions covering Morgan's visit to Ukraine, where he was invited by First Lady of Ukraine Olena Zelenska to host her second Kyiv Summit of First Ladies and Gentlemen.
26	Rishi Sunak and Liz Truss take part in their second head-to-head Conservative leadership debate, hosted by The Sun and TalkTV. The debate, presented by TalkTV political editor Kate McCann, is halted after around 30 minutes when McCann faints on stage. The Sun political editor Harry Cole, who was due to co-host the debate, had earlier pulled out after testing positive for COVID-19. McCann is back on air the following evening, presenting talkTV's The News Desk, where she describes herself as "a little embarrassed, a little bit bruised but glad to be back and totally fine". Bosses at TalkTV subsequently hold an investigation into why there was no backup plan as several presenters were in the News Building and could have taken over hosting the debate at short notice.
27	Piers Morgan Uncensored airs a world exclusive hour-long interview with Ukrainian president Volodymyr Zelenskyy and his wife First Lady Olena Zelenska, the first interview the couple have given to international television.
27	EastEnders confirms that Jaime Winstone will play a young Peggy Mitchell in a flashback episode due to air in the autumn.
28	The first filmed sentencing in a criminal case in England and Wales takes place at the Old Bailey, where a sentencing for manslaughter is presided over by Judge Sarah Munro QC.
28	BBC One airs the opening ceremony of the 2022 Commonwealth Games, which is seen by a peak audience of 5 million.
28	Ofcom is to launch an investigation into GB News after presenter Mark Steyn made misleading claims about COVID-19 booster vaccines on the 21 April edition of his show. Steyn had alleged that British people were being killed by having the booster and that there was a media silence on the issue.
29	Conservative leadership candidate Rishi Sunak takes part in an interview with Andrew Neil on Channel 4.
29	Channel 5 airs the final episode of Neighbours, with an average audience of 2.5 million tuning in. Viewing figures peak at 3 million, giving the series its highest UK audience since it moved to Channel 5 in 2008. The finale is accompanied by the documentary Neighbours Made Me a Star: From Ramsay St to Hollywood, and music clip show Neighbours: All the Pop Hits & More, Especially For You. Both are aired by Channel 5 on the same night.
29	Metro reports that BBC One are in talks with MGM Television to bring back 1990s Saturday night show Gladiators, which aired from 1992 to 2000 on ITV and was subsequently revived from 2008 to 2009 on Sky One.
31	BBC One broadcasts the UEFA Women's Euro 2022 Final between England and Germany in which England defeat Germany 2–1 in extra time. The broadcast is watched by an average 11 million viewers, but attracts a peak audience of 17.4 million, making it the most watched event on television of 2022 and the most watched women's football match.
31	The Daily Telegraph reports that TalkTV and GB News are in a bidding war to secure Channel 604 on the Virgin Media Platform. The news channels currently occupy channels 626 and 627, but a move would increase their profile by putting them next to larger rivals such as BBC News and Sky News.

=== August ===
Date	Event
1	Various news outlets report that ITV2 are set to revive Big Brother in 2023, with a format overhaul "for the Love Island generation". ITV later confirm the reports.
1	Jeremy Kyle takes over as a stand in presenter for TalkTV's Piers Morgan Uncensored while Morgan is on holiday. Morgan is scheduled to return on 5 September.
1	Ekin-Su Cülcüloğlu and Davide Sanclimenti are named winners of the eighth series of Love Island in a live final aired by ITV2.
2	The BBC confirms that Mock the Week will end after 17 years, with the final eight episodes airing in the autumn.
3	BBC Birmingham announces it will move into new premises built at the former Typhoo Tea factory in the city's Digbeth area, with a date of 2026 set for the move.
3	Millie Gibson, who plays Kelly Neelan in Coronation Street, announces she has quit the show, and is leaving at the end of the year as part of an explosive storyline.
3	Cardiff drops out of the race to host the 2023 Eurovision Song Contest as it would be required to cancel a "significant number" of other events to host it.
4	Sky News airs The Battle for Number 10 with Kay Burley, a Conservative leadership debate with Rishi Sunak and Liz Truss to replace PM Boris Johnson.
4	Actor Will Mellor and actress and TV presenter Kym Marsh are announced as the first contestants taking part on series 20 of Strictly Come Dancing.
5	Sky Sports football commentator Martin Tyler apologises after referring to "Hillsborough and other hooligan-related issues" in an interview for BBC Radio 4's Today Programme in which he was speaking about the 1992 launch of the Premier League.
6	Doctors actress Sarah Moyle announces her departure from the soap after ten years of appearing as Valerie Pitman.
7	It is announced that Paralympic swimmer Ellie Simmonds will take part in series 20 of Strictly Come Dancing.
8	ITV announces details of storylines for the upcoming fiftieth anniversary of Emmerdale in October, with the plot centring around a deadly storm that is described as the "biggest stunt to date". The episodes will also feature a new birth, the death of character Faith Dingle (Sally Dexter), as well as the brief returns of characters Aaron Dingle (Danny Miller) and Diane Sugden (Elizabeth Estensen).
8	The Daily Telegraph reports the BBC are planning to sell the Elstree Studios in Hertfordshire, home of EastEnders, as a way of offsetting losses made through below-inflation increases in the TV licence fee. It is reported the BBC will then rent the studios back from the buyer.
8	BBC One airs the closing ceremony of the 2022 Commonwealth Games from Birmingham's Alexander Stadium. Acts featured in the ceremony include UB40, Dexy's Midnight Runners and Ozzy Osbourne. These were the last Commonwealth Games to be televised by the BBC. From 2026, TNT Sports will take over the broadcasting rights.
8	It is announced that GB News has beaten TalkTV to secure a channel move on Virgin Media's platform to Channel 604, giving it a higher news channel ranking, and placing it between Sky News and BBC Parliament.
8	An Ofcom investigation clears Nigel Farage's Talking Pints programme of breaching standards following an interview on 23 August 2021 that featured darts player Bobby George using what was described as "offensive language". The decision means GB News remains clear of any reprimands from Ofcom since its launch.
9	TalkTV airs a Conservative Party hustings meeting from Darlington, County Durham featuring leadership candidates Rishi Sunak and Liz Truss. The debate is chaired by Tom Newton Dunn.
10	GB News airs The People's Forum with Liz Truss from Leigh, Greater Manchester with Conservative leadership candidate Truss answering questions from an audience.
11	Broadcast reports that a revival deal for Survivor UK is "on the brink", and that if the deal is finalised, the programme will be launched in 2023 on BBC One. The series initially aired for two years in the early 2000s on ITV.
11	Television reporter Rachel Sweeney announces she is leaving her role as GB News Correspondent for the North East. She is subsequently appointed as a producer on Channel 4's Steph's Packed Lunch.
12	London, Birmingham, Glasgow, Leeds, Liverpool, Manchester, Newcastle and Sheffield are shortlisted as potential locations for the 2023 Eurovision Song Contest.
13	The BBC announce that Sid Owen is returning to EastEnders, reprising his role for a guest stint as Ricky Butcher after ten years away.
14	Prime Minister Boris Johnson launches the "Dame Barbara Windsor Dementia Mission", a national mission named for the late actress to tackle dementia and increase funding for research into the condition.
15	Sky Sports presenter Graeme Souness says he does not regret describing football as "a man's game" after drawing criticism for making the comment following a game in which Chelsea drew 2–2 with Tottenham.
16	The Advertising Standards Authority (ASA) is considering whether to investigate an advertising campaign by Crown Paints that has attracted criticism from comedian Jenny Eclair. Eclair has said the "Hannah & Dave" advert should be taken off air because it implies that a woman "conned a man into fatherhood".
16	Jeremy Paxman announces he will step down as presenter of University Challenge after 28 years, with his final edition airing in summer 2023.
17	ITV takes over the UK coverage of the National Football League from the BBC, with a three-year free-to-air deal.
17	Former BBC newsreader Simon McCoy warns against the merging of the BBC News and BBC World News channels amid concerns it may not be able to provide good coverage of domestic UK news stories and send viewers to rivals such as Sky and GB News.
18	The BBC confirms that Amol Rajan will succeed Jeremy Paxman as presenter of University Challenge.
18	The BBC announces that Rose Ayling-Ellis will leave her EastEnders role as character Frankie Lewis after two years with the series.
18	Warner Bros. Discovery announces its intention to sell its stake in GB News. It is also announced that co-founders Andrew Cole and Mark Schneider have resigned as directors and sold their stakes in the business. GB News has also approached investor Paul Marshall for further funding.
18	GB News confirms Camilla Tominey, Andrew Pierce and Michael Portillo will join its presenting line up.
19	GB News airs a two-hour Conservative leadership hustings meeting from Manchester featuring the two candidates.
22	The acting union, Equity, commits to ensuring actors are given nudity warnings as part of a move "against bullying, harassment and inappropriate behaviour in TV".
22	Jules Buckley directs a BBC Proms concert dedicated to the music of Aretha Franklin; it is shown on BBC Four on 26 August.
22	Strictly Come Dancing confirms its Blackpool Week from the Blackpool Tower Ballroom will return in 2022 with an edition celebrating the BBC's centenary.
22	Channel 4 announces plans to celebrate its 40th anniversary with a satirical musical about the life of Prince Andrew.
22	Laura Whitmore announces she will step down as presenter of Love Island, citing conflicting projects as a key factor in her decision.
22	Ruth Langsford returns to This Morning to present alongside Rylan Clark while regular presenters Alison Hammond and Dermot O'Leary are on holiday. Her reappearance on the show prompts viewers to call for her to be reinstated as a regular presenter.
23	Nominations for the 27th National Television Awards are published. They include a posthumous nomination for Tom Parker of The Wanted for his 2021 documentary Inside My Head about his brain tumour, aired five months before his death.
25	The BBC confirms reports it is planning to bring back Gladiators, previously shown on ITV and Sky One, and will air an 11-episode series on BBC One and BBC iPlayer in 2024.
25	The BBC announces that the United Kingdom are to participate in the Junior Eurovision Song Contest for the first time since 2005, with the BBC replacing ITV as the country's broadcaster.
25	Addressing the Edinburgh Television Festival, Channel 4's Chief Content Officer, Ian Katz describes news that Big Brother is being relaunched by ITV2 as a "depressing" moment when old TV hits are being "reheated".
25	Former Newsnight presenter Emily Maitlis delivers the prestigious MacTaggart Lecture at the Edinburgh Television Festival in which she claims the BBC went out of its way to "pacify" Downing Street after she said it was clear Dominic Cummings had breached lockdown rules in 2020. Her claim is rejected by BBC Chief Content Officer Charlotte Moore.
28	GB News attracts criticism from Jewish community groups after Peter Imanuelsen, a journalist and alleged Holocaust denier, appeared on the previous evening's edition of Neil Oliver's programme to talk about population decline in the UK. Imanuelsen rejects claims of denying the Holocaust, blaming "fake, photoshopped screenshots" created by those attempting to "smear" him.
29	Conservative Party leadership candidate Liz Truss pulls out of a one-to-one interview with the BBC's Nick Robinson, scheduled to air on BBC One the following day, with her team saying she cannot devote the time to the broadcast.
30	Property expert and television presenter Sarah Beeny reveals that she is undergoing treatment for breast cancer, but says she will continue work on an upcoming series for Channel 4.
30	ITV announces a one-off special The Masked Singer: I'm A Celebrity Special, as a mashup of The Masked Singer and I'm a Celebrity...Get Me Out of Here!, in anticipation of the latter show's return to Australia later this autumn.
30	Ofcom decides to take no action over thousands of complaints about alleged misogyny during the latest series of Love Island.
30	To coincide with the 20th anniversary of the debut of children's television series Balamory, a selection of episodes are made available on BBC iPlayer.
31	GB News performs a shakeup of its daytime schedule which will take effect from the first week in September, giving Gloria de Piero and Philip Davies and Esther McVey new shows, while Alexandra Phillips and Colin Brazier are axed from the channel.

=== September ===
Date	Event
1	Talking Pictures TV launches a Red Button service for its TPTV Encore catch-up facility.
2	The BBC has donated £1.42m from the sales of the 1995 Panorama documentary, An Interview with HRH The Princess of Wales to seven charities with links to the princess.
3	The Crown have cast unknown actors in the role of Prince William and Catherine Middleton. Ed McVey and Rufus Kampa are both cast as William, while Meg Bellamy is cast as Kate.
3	Some of the CBeebies programming were returned on BBC Two when its Saturday morning strand rebranded as the "Kids Zone".
4	Launch of the politics programme Sunday with Laura Kuenssberg on BBC One. Guests on the opening edition are Conservative leadership candidates Rishi Sunak and Liz Truss, First Lady of Ukraine Olena Zelenska, and the comedian Joe Lycett, who makes the headlines for mocking Truss, who is subsequently named as the new prime minister.
4	Talking Pictures TV begins re-running the 1970s BBC drama The Onedin Line.
5	EastEnders airs a special episode set in 1979, featuring the childhoods of Grant and Phil Mitchell and starring Jaime Winstone as a younger version of Peggy Mitchell.
6	BBC Chairman Richard Sharp says Emily Maitlis was "completely wrong" to suggest the rebuke she received for on-air remarks about Dominic Cummings in 2020 made "no sense".
6	Michelle Donelan is appointed as Secretary of State for Culture, replacing Nadine Dorries.
6	ITV pulls Emmerdale from the evening's schedule to show a women's football match between England and Luxembourg.
6	"Families", an episode of Peppa Pig introduces the series' first same-sex couple when one of the characters tells Peppa about her two mothers.
7	GB News appoints Nicole O'Shea as Commercial Director, responsible for advertising on the channel.
7	The BBC reveal the lineup for the fourth series of RuPaul's Drag Race UK.
8	At 12.39pm, BBC One suspends regular programming, interrupting partway through an episode of Bargain Hunt, after Buckingham Palace announces that Queen Elizabeth II is under medical supervision, and provides rolling news updates on her health. Programmes such as Doctors are moved to BBC Two. ITV suspends its programming at 5.00pm, while other channels continue with their normal programming. Following the announcement of her death at 6.30pm, major broadcasters shift to broadcasting coverage of events following the announcement. A pre-agreed advertising blackout also comes into force on ITV, Channel 4 and Channel 5 until at least 5.00am on 10 September, although commercials continue on some non-flagship channels such as ITV2. Among the programmes to be pulled from the BBC One schedule are the semi-final of Celebrity MasterChef in which contestants celebrate the Platinum Jubilee. BBC Three and BBC Four are taken off air. The 31st Mercury Prize ceremony, scheduled for the evening of 8 September and due to air on BBC Four, is postponed.
9	BBC One devotes the day's schedule to rolling news coverage of the death of the Queen, which includes the special programme A Tribute to Her Majesty The Queen that sees King Charles III, along with Princess Anne and Prince Edward, pay tribute to their mother. There are also schedule changes on BBC Two to allow it to accommodate for shows such as EastEnders. ITV carries rolling news coverage from the end of Good Morning Britain at 9.00am until the evening news. The day's episodes of Emmerdale and Coronation Street are postponed. A feature-length documentary, Queen Elizabeth II – The Longest Reign presented by Jonathan Dimbleby, airs at 8.30pm, and is followed by News at Ten. Channel 4 makes schedule changes to add extra news coverage, although programmes such as Steph's Packed Lunch and Countdown are shown. It is also confirmed that the new series of Gogglebox scheduled to air at 9.00pm will go ahead, but the evening's edition of The Last Leg will not air. Channel 5 also adds extra news coverage, with a 35-minute news special at 12.00pm, and another from 5.00pm–7.15pm, while a documentary, HM The Queen 1926–2022, airs at 6.00am. The day's episode of Home and Away due to air at 1.45pm is cancelled and instead replaced with Iceland with Alexander Armstrong at 1.20pm and World's Most Scenic Railway Journeys at 2.00pm. The evening news special is followed by a rescheduled edition of Susan Calman's Grand Days Out at 7.15pm. The Last Night of the Proms, scheduled to take place at the Royal Albert Hall the next evening, is cancelled, as is a Proms concert due to take place on the evening of 9 September. The 27th National Television Awards, scheduled to be held at Wembley Arena on 15 September, are postponed until October.
9	At 6.00pm, King Charles III makes his first broadcast to the nation, where he pays tribute to his mother, Queen Elizabeth II, and renews her "lifelong promise of service", calling her his "darling mama".
9	Viewing figures for 8 September indicate that the announcement of the death at 6.30pm was seen by 15.80 million on multiple channels. In the 14 hours from 12.00pm to 2.00am a cumulative audience of 33 million tuned in to television coverage on all channels as news of the death of the Queen broke.
10	At 10.00am the Proclamation of accession of Charles III is held at St James's Palace, and becomes the first such ceremony to be televised.
10	The majority of BBC One's daytime and evening schedule is carried by BBC Two for the second day in a row, with shows such as Flog It!, Superman & Lois, The Hit List, Pointless Celebrities and Casualty making way for ongoing coverage of events following the Queen's death. Following coverage of the Proclamation of accession of Charles III and a series of documentaries about Queen Elizabeth, ITV runs an evening of scheduled programmes from 6.00pm. Ninja Warrior UK, The Masked Dancer, The Voice UK and Who Wants to Be a Millionaire? are all shown, but without commercial breaks and at slightly different times to their original scheduling.
10	Mary Reynolds, who has portrayed the Queen in film and television since 1988, announces she will retire from the role "out of respect" following the death of Elizabeth II.
11	ITV airs the first Sunday edition of Good Morning Britain to cover events following the death of the Queen. The programme is presented by Kate Garraway, who wins praise from viewers after presenting part of the programme solo.
11	After another day of special coverage, BBC One begins reintroducing some scheduled content from the early evening, airing the billed episodes of Frozen Planet II at 8.00pm and The Capture at 9.00pm; there are also special editions of Songs of Praise at 4.25pm, Countryfile at 6.00pm and The Antiques Roadshow at 7.00pm, all celebrating the Queen. On ITV the 8 September episode of Emmerdale airs at 6.35pm, followed by Gino's Italy at 7.30pm and Ridley at 8.00pm. Commercial breaks are also reintroduced from the early evening.
11	Channel 4 confirms that Series 13 of The Great British Bake Off will begin as planned on 13 September.
12	Television schedules continue to be revised to provide ongoing coverage of events following the death of Elizabeth II, as Charles III makes his first visit to the Palace of Westminster as King, then travels to Edinburgh to attends a church service for his mother, and Elizabeth's children pay tribute to her at the city's St Giles Cathedral. BBC One airs news coverage throughout the day, along with a special edition of The One Show titled Our Queen Remembered at 8.30pm. EastEnders is shown on BBC Two at 9.00pm, and plans are announced to release new episodes on BBC iPlayer each evening at 7.30pm. News coverage and programming about the Queen air throughout the day on ITV until early evening when the game shows Tipping Point and The Chase are scheduled to air. The episode of Coronation Street originally scheduled for 9 September is shown, but an hour-long episode of Emmerdale does not go ahead.
12	EastEnders pays tribute to Elizabeth II with a scene at the beginning of the evening's episode during which Linda Carter (Kellie Bright), Denise Fox (Diane Parish) and Kathy Beale (Gillian Taylforth) have a conversation about the Queen in The Queen Vic.
13	Television schedules continue to be subject to change as Charles III travels to Northern Ireland, and Queen Elizabeth's coffin is flown from Edinburgh to London ready for lying in state. Much of BBC One's schedule is once again changed to provide coverage of these events. Following The Eve of the Procession to Lying In State at 6.45pm, The One Show: Our Queen Remembered is aired at 8.30pm, followed by EastEnders at 9.00pm. An edition of The Repair Shop is shown after that. Following Good Morning Britain, ITV airs Lorraine and This Morning as scheduled, before providing extended news coverage in the afternoon. Emmerdale is aired at 8.35pm, with the episode originally scheduled for 9 September showing in two halves (the second part on 14 September at 7.30pm). A documentary, Charles: The Monarch and the Man, follows Emmerdale, while another documentary, Our Queen: The People's Stories, is shown after News at Ten. On Channel 4 The Great British Bake Off airs at 8.00pm.
13	The BBC announces it will postpone the opening edition of Series 20 of Strictly Come Dancing from its scheduled launch on Saturday 17 September because of ongoing changes to the listings. The live launch will instead air on Friday 23 September before the first live edition is shown the following evening.
13	It is reported the BBC has received 670 complaints about its blanket coverage of the death of Queen Elizabeth II. The news comes as singer Shane Nolan attracts online criticism for being disrespectful after he complains on social media about the BBC's coverage and extensive rescheduling of regular programmes.
13	A Premier League match between Manchester City and Brentford scheduled for 3.00pm on 12 November is moved to the earlier start time of 12.30pm after being selected for television coverage by BT Sport.
14	The BBC One and ITV schedules are once again amended, to provide coverage of the procession to carry the Queen's coffin from Buckingham Palace to Westminster Hall for her lying in state. BBC One adds two additional programmes to its daytime schedule, coverage of the procession from 1.00pm to 4.30pm and an Events of the Day at 7.00pm. There is also ongoing news coverage, with scheduled programming resuming at 8.30pm with EastEnders and the Seriesc Seven finale of Shetland at 9.00pm. A documentary, Elizabeth II: Her Passions and Pastimes, airs after News at Ten. ITV also shows coverage of the procession from 1.00pm following a morning of scheduled programmes. In the evening, Emmerdale and Coronation Street are shown, with the second half of the 9 September episode of Emmerdale at 7.30pm and the Coronation Street episode originally scheduled for Monday 12 September at 8.00pm. These are followed by Doc Martin at 9.00pm.
14	The BBC launches a dedicated livestream of the Queen's lying in state at Westminster Hall allowing people who cannot make the trip to London to pay their respects virtually. The service is available worldwide and throughout the time of the lying in state, and is broadcast on the BBC website, BBC News website and BBC News app, BBC iPlayer, BBC Parliament and BBC Red Button. ITV also offers a livestreaming service.
14	Tim Muffett, a reporter on BBC Breakfast, attracts viewer criticism for not wearing black clothing while reporting on mourners waiting to see the Queen's lying in state from Lambeth Bridge, instead wearing grey with a navy tie. BBC reporters and presenters are required to wear black following the death of a monarch or senior royal.
15	There are more schedule changes as coverage of the build up to the Queen's funeral continues. BBC One and BBC Two both have schedule changes with extended news coverage. On BBC One, EastEnders airs as scheduled at 7.30pm followed by an episode of The Repair Shop and two editions of Celebrity MasterChef, including the one scheduled for 8 September. The World War II film Their Finest is added to the schedule after an extended News at Ten. There is extended news coverage on BBC Two, while regular programmes such as Eggheads, Villages by the Sea and Gorey, Stuck, and Sensationalists: The Bad Boys and Girls of British Art are pulled from the line up, and two extra programmes, Cricket: Women's T20 Highlights and Days That Shook the BBC, are broadcast from 11.15pm. Starting from 7.30pm, ITV broadcasts three episodes of Emmerdale in order to catch up on episodes originally scheduled for the period 12–14 September. Coronation Street broadcasts an hour-long episode at 9.00pm.
16	Nick Servini temporarily replaces Huw Edwards on BBC One's news coverage as Charles III visits Wales for the first time since becoming King. The BBC says that this is to enable Edwards to prepare for coverage of the Queen's state funeral.
16	With coverage of events surrounding the Queen's death ongoing, changes continue to be made to the television schedules. ITV is scheduled to air two episodes of Emmerdale, but has to drop one in favour of extended news coverage and reschedule it for Sunday 18 September at 6.30pm. The evening's scheduled edition of Coronation Street is also moved to Sunday 18 September, where it will air from 7.00pm to 7.55pm.
16	This Morning presenters Phillip Schofield and Holly Willoughby attend the lying in state of Queen Elizabeth II at Westminster Hall, leading to online speculation that they jumped the queue. This Morning subsequently issues a statement saying the pair were there to record material to be shown after the Queen's funeral.
16	Channel 5 confirms the episode of Home and Away due to air at 1.45pm on the day of the Queen's funeral has been pulled from the schedule. Although the 19 September episode is previewed as usual on 5STAR at 6.30pm on 16 September, it will not air on Channel 5 and instead the series will resume in its afternoon Channel 5 slot on 20 September.
17	Further schedule changes are implemented ahead of the Queen's funeral. BBC One and BBC Two air some extended news coverage, while BBC One adds the 2014 film Paddington to its evening schedule at 7.00pm. It is preceded by When Paddington Met the Queen (first aired during the Platinum Jubilee celebrations). BBC Two drops an evening of programmes dedicated to Kylie Minogue in favour of the films Stan and Ollie and The Two Faces of January. ITV moves its coverage of the Goodwood Revival Festival from its main channel to ITV3 and drops the scheduled edition of Celebrity Lingo.
18	There is further programme rescheduling on the eve of the Queen's funeral. BBC One moves its coverage of a Women's Super League match in the afternoon to BBC Two, while an extra programme, The Eve of the State Funeral of HM Queen Elizabeth II, is added at 7.00pm. This is followed by a televised message from Queen Camilla in which she pays tribute to the Queen, and a minute's silence at 8.00pm, which is carried by both BBC One and ITV. On ITV, Good Morning Britain replaces Sunday morning CITV programming, and begins from 6.00am, while the Goodwood Revival Festival once again airs on ITV3 and Celebrity Lingo is axed to make way for Coronation Street.
19	The state funeral of Elizabeth II is held at Westminster Abbey and shown on television, with the BBC providing pooled footage to other broadcasters, and more than 50 channels covering the proceedings. BBC One and BBC Two provide coverage from 8.00am until 5.00pm, with BBC Two doing so with on screen sign language. BBC One airs The One Show: Our Queen Remembered at 6.15pm following extended news coverage, and the film Paddington 2 at 6.45pm. A 90-minute programme covering the main events of the day is broadcast at 8.30pm. ITV simulcasts programming on all of its channels from 6.00am to midnight (the first time it has done so), beginning with Good Morning Britain, coverage of the funeral, and in the evening a documentary covering the events of the last ten days. Sky News begins its coverage from 5.00am. GB News and TalkTV also show the funeral, along with special programming. Channel 4 and Channel 5 opt not to show the funeral, Channel 4 instead broadcasting the 1953 technicolour documentary A Queen Is Crowned narrated by Laurence Olivier. Channel 5 airs a selection of children's films, starting with The Emoji Movie at 11.00am, followed by Stuart Little and Ice Age 3. Advertising on commercial television is once again paused for the day. Some cinema chains, including Curzon and Arc, screen the funeral for free while cancelling the rest of their programming for the day.
20	Provisional viewing figures for the previous day indicate a cumulative audience of over 28 million watched the Queen's funeral, with the number of viewers peaking at 12.25pm. The BBC and ITV had a collective audience of over 25 million, with 20 million tuning into the BBC's coverage and a peak of 5.3 million watching ITV.
20	BBC One airs an episode of EastEnders originally scheduled for the previous evening but removed from the listings because of the Queen's funeral. On ITV, two episodes of Emmerdale are shown, including the one from the previous evening. The previous evening's episode of Coronation Street is also aired.
20	In a special edition of This Morning about the Queen, presenter Holly Willoughby addresses allegations they jumped the queue at Elizabeth II's lying in state after using a VIP route, saying she and Phillip Schofield were there "strictly for reporting" and "would never jump a queue".
20	Culture Secretary Michelle Donelan announces plans to "re-examine the business case" for privatising Channel 4.
21	Helen Warner, chief creative officer at broadcast production company Whisper and former head of daytime at ITV and Channel 4, is appointed GB News' Head of Television as the channel seeks to expand its programme content.
22	The Guardian reports that Buckingham Palace have requested that video footage of the Queen's funeral only be used in news coverage, not in entertainment programmes, and that five short pieces of video featuring members of the royal family not be broadcast again.
22	The BBC announces that BBC Two's Later... with Jools Holland is to celebrate its 30th anniversary with a one-off night of music in front of an audience of 3,000 at London's Eventim Apollo on 5 October. The event will be shown on television later in the year.
22	It is confirmed that past contestants from I'm A Celebrity... Get Me Out Of Here! will compete in a special "all-stars" series in 2023, and set in South Africa.
22	Lisa Snowdon wins the 2022 series of Celebrity MasterChef.
24	Scottish soap River City celebrates its 20th anniversary.
27	The shortlist of cities contending to host the 2023 Eurovision Song Contest is cut from eight to two, with Liverpool or Glasgow going head-to-head for the final selection.
27	Channel 4 HD moves to channel 104 on Sky, Freesat and Virgin Media in many parts of England, Scotland and Northern Ireland. The HD version of Channel 4 has previously only been available on channel 104 in London, with viewers in the rest of the UK required to scroll down the channel list to find it.
30	Sue Barker tells BBC Breakfast her departure from A Question of Sport could have been "handled better" and says she was asked to say she was stepping back from the role of presenter rather than being replaced.
30	Former BBC News Europe and North America Editor Mark Mardell reveals that he has been diagnosed with Parkinson's disease.

=== October ===
Date	Event
2	The BBC blames "technical glitches" for a temporary blackout during the day's edition of Sunday with Laura Kuenssberg on which Prime Minister Liz Truss was making her first television appearance since the market turbulence caused by the September 2022 United Kingdom mini-budget.
2	The Sunday Times reports that the value of GB News has more than halved since Warner Bros. Discovery sold its stake in the news channel.
4	The BBC have reached a settlement with Alan Waller, the former head of security for Charles Spencer, 9th Earl Spencer after his bank statements were forged by Martin Bashir to help secure the 1995 Panorama interview with Diana, Princess of Wales.
4	ITV reschedules Coronation Street to make way for a women's football match between England and the United States at 8.00pm on 7 October. Coronation Street is instead broadcast at 8.00pm on 4 October, then as scheduled at 8.00pm the following evening, with the 8.00pm Friday episode replaced by the football.
6	Tom Stevenson, a student at the University of Worcester, achieves a double record on Channel 4's Countdown by scoring 154 points (beating the previous highest record of 152) and becoming the first person to progress through 120 rounds of the game without a single loss.
6	GB News have appointed Reach plc executive Geoff Marsh as their Chief Digital Officer.
6	TalkTV have signed a new distribution deal with Virgin Media that will see it move from Channel 627 to the more prominent Channel 606, where it will sit between BBC Parliament and Bloomberg.
7	Liverpool is chosen to be the host city of the Eurovision Song Contest 2023.
8	BBC Two's Later... with Jools Holland reaches its 30th anniversary.
9	The 2022 BAFTA Cymru Awards Ceremony is held in Cardiff, the first to take place in-person since the start of the COVID-19 pandemic.
9	Percussionist Jordan Ashman is named the 2022 BBC Young Musician of the Year.
10	TalkTV launches its autumn schedule, with new programmes Jeremy Kyle Live at 7.00pm and First Edition with Tom Newton Dunn at 10.00pm.
10	Actor John Cleese confirms he will present a programme for GB News from 2023, where he will work alongside Andrew Doyle.
10	It is reported the upcoming fifth series of the Netflix drama The Crown will see Prince Philip "pursue an affair" with his friend Penelope Knatchbull, leading to criticism about its timing after the recent death of Queen Elizabeth II. Dickie Arbiter, the Queen's spokesman between 1988 and 2000, describes the fictitious storyline as "distasteful".
10	England captain Harry Kane makes his CBeebies Bedtime Stories debut reading The Lion Inside by Rachel Bright.
11	Netflix signs up to the Broadcasters' Audience Research Board for externally measure viewership in the UK.
12	Maya Jama confirms she will succeed Laura Whitmore as presenter of Love Island.
12	Streaming service Netflix has signed up to the audience research body BARB, which will begin collecting data on its viewing figures from 1 November.
13	The 27th National Television Awards are held following their rescheduling because of Elizabeth II's death. The ceremony marks the first National Television Awards to be held at Wembley since 1995 after its usual venue, the O2 Arena, was damaged during Storm Eunice.
13	Netflix confirms the launch of a cheaper subscription service containing commercials that will launch in November and cost £4.99 per month.
13	The Holocaust Memorial Day Trust has criticised a new Channel 4 programme in which pieces of art by controversial artists will be potentially destroyed after a piece by Adolf Hitler was included. Jimmy Carr Destroys Art will see an audience debate whether various pieces of art can be separated from their controversial creators and if as a consequence they should be destroyed. The Holocaust Day Memorial Day Trust has described the programme as "deeply inappropriate" and "inflammatory".
14	Ofcom announces an investigation into GB News over its coverage of matters relating to Coronavirus vaccination following an interview with the author Naomi Wolf that aired on 4 October, and during which she claimed women were being harmed by Coronavirus vaccines as part of an effort "to destroy British civil society", while likening the behaviour of the medical profession to that of Nazi Germany. Ofcom's investigation will cover whether the interview broke "rules designed to protect viewers from harmful material", and is the second such investigation into the news channel.
16	Emmerdale celebrates its 50th anniversary.
17	Netflix has defended The Crown as a "real-life dramatisation" after criticism from Sir John Major over a scene which apparently depicts a plot to oust Queen Elizabeth II, with the former Prime Minister describing it as "a barrel-load of malicious nonsense".
18	The BBC celebrates its centenary. Across the corporation special programmes will air, including a three-part documentary series titled David Dimbleby's BBC: A Very British History, Kids' TV: The Surprising Story celebrating 100 years of children's programming presented by Konnie Huq, and a programme presented by Harry Enfield and Paul Whitehouse titled The Love Box In Your Living Room that takes a humorous look at the BBC's history.
18	Sky launches its new streaming box, Sky Stream, and becomes the second service from Sky, after Sky Glass, without the need of a satellite dish.
20	BBC One reschedules the evening's edition of Question Time from 10.40pm to 8.00pm following the resignation of Liz Truss as Prime Minister. The edition, which airs live from Cheltenham, also includes a late change of panellists, replacing artist Cornelia Parker with journalist Rachel Johnson amid speculation her brother, Boris Johnson, may run in the resulting leadership election.
20	Channel 4 News have taken Krishnan Guru-Murthy off air for a week after he was heard on air describing Steve Baker, the Minister of State for Northern Ireland, as a cunt following an interview the previous day.
20	GB News attracts criticism from Jewish groups and campaigners, including the Board of Deputies of British Jews, following use of the word "globalist" by two of its presenters in describing newly appointed Home Secretary Grant Shapps, who is himself Jewish. The groups argue the word, used by Nigel Farage and Dan Wootton, is an anti-Semitic term used by the far-right.
21	Following concerns about some content in The Crown, Netflix adds a disclaimer to its promotion for the series, describing it as a "real-life dramatisation", "inspired by certain events".
21	TalkTV announces that Conservative MP Nadine Dorries will guest present two editions of Piers Morgan Uncensored on 24 and 25 October to coincide with the Conservative Party leadership election. She will be joined by Emily Sheffield, former editor of the London Evening Standard.
23	Jodie Whittaker makes her final Doctor Who appearance as the Thirteenth Doctor in the feature-length episode "The Power of the Doctor". The episode sees Whittaker's Doctor regenerate into the Fourteenth Doctor, portrayed by David Tennant (who previously played the Tenth Doctor). It is watched by an average of 3.7 million viewers, significantly less than Whittaker's debut episode which was seen by an audience of 8.2 million.
24	BBC News have taken presenter Martine Croxall off air while an investigation is held into a potential breach of impartiality after telling viewers during the previous evening's newspaper review she felt "gleeful" about Boris Johnson's decision not to stand in the Conservative Party leadership election.
25	Joel Mawhinney is named as Blue Peter's 41st presenter, and will present alongside Richie Driss, Mwaksy Mudenda and Henry the dog.
26	King Charles III appears in an episode of BBC One's The Repair Shop.
28	The first televised sentencing at a murder trial in England and Wales takes place at the Old Bailey. This follows the first televised manslaughter sentencing on 28 July. Jemma Mitchell, 38, is given a minimum term of 34 years for killing and decapitating 67-year-old Mee Kuen Chong at her London home in June 2021.
29	ITV News journalist Amber de Botton is appointed as the new Downing Street Director of Communications.
31	Sky sells its stake in Nickelodeon UK Ltd to Paramount Networks EMEAA. The Nickelodeon agreement had contained a non-compete clause that otherwise restricted Sky and Comcast from launching a children's television network while still holding a stake in Nickelodeon UK Ltd. Less than a month later, Sky announces plans to launch its own linear kids channel.

=== November ===
Date	Event
1	Welsh language channel S4C celebrates its 40th anniversary.
1	Former Health Secretary Matt Hancock is suspended from the Parliamentary Conservative Party and has the whip withdrawn after announcing that he is joining the reality television series I'm a Celebrity...Get Me Out of Here!.
1	The encryption is removed from the HD variants of ITV2, ITV3 and ITV4. Consequently, the channels start broadcasting as free-to-air services.
2	Channel 4 celebrates its 40th anniversary. As part of the celebrations, they announce plans for spring 2023 to rework their brand, including aligning its sister services with the Channel 4 brand, and streaming service All 4 being renamed to Channel 4
2	Labour MP Rosie Cooper criticises the ITV drama The Walk-In, which dramatized an operation to foil a plot by far-right extremists to kill her, as a "stupid, stupid, stupid series" which used her "as a marketing tool". ITV says the series was "overwhelmingly in the public interest" and had been made "carefully and responsibly".
2	Coronation Street star Wendi Peters announces on Morning Live that she has joined Doctors as regular character Nina Bulsara.
3	The BBC finds that comments made by Martine Croxall during a newspaper review on 23 October breached their impartiality guidelines. Croxall, who has been off air since then, returns to presenting on the BBC News Channel the following day.
6	I'm a Celebrity...Get Me Out of Here! returns for its twenty-second series on ITV, and is once again filmed in Australia.
7	Olivia Attwood is forced to pull out of I'm a Celebrity... Get Me Out of Here! following medical advice that it would not be safe for her to continue.
9	Matt Hancock is seen completing his first Bush Tucker trial in I'm a Celebrity...Get Me Out of Here!.
9	Series Five of The Crown is released. The series' first official viewing figures released the following day indicate that 1.1 million people have viewed at least one episode on its first day of availability.
10	David Walliams has apologised for making sexually explicit and derogatory remarks about contestants on Britain's Got Talent.
12	BBC newsreader Huw Edwards hosts the 2022 Royal British Legion Festival of Remembrance at the Royal Albert Hall, the first to be staged since Charles III ascended to the throne.
12	Talking Pictures TV begins rerunning the 1990s ITV true crime series In Suspicious Circumstances presented by Edward Woodward.
14	Channel 4 announces the cancellation of its flagship school drama series Ackley Bridge after five years.
14	The BBC confirms plans for a TV adaptation of the Douglas Stuart novel Shuggie Bain.
15	ITV reverts its flagship channel's name back to "ITV1" (in England, Wales, Scottish Borders, Isle of Man and Channel Islands – including Northern Ireland), and their other channels (excluding CITV) get a refresh to coincide with the upcoming launch ITV's new streaming service ITVX.
15	The pressure group Coronavirus Bereaved Families for Justice says it has flown a banner over the I'm a Celebrity...Get Me Out of Here! camp demanding Matt Hancock be removed from the series.
16	Ofcom confirms it has received 1,000 viewer complaints relating to Matt Hancock's appearance in I'm a Celebrity...Get Me Out of Here!.
17	ITV begins the roll out of their new streaming platform, ITVX.
17	Amazon Studios and Fremantle have agreed a deal to restart production of Neighbours in 2023; the series will be made available through Amazon's Freevee streaming service.
18	BBC One airs Children in Need 2022. During the evening, Millie Gibson is unveiled as the new Doctor Who companion, Ruby Sunday; she will join Ncuti Gatwa's Fifteenth Doctor in 2023. A total of £35m is raised on the night, slightly less than in 2021.
18	Waitrose apologises after receiving criticism from cancer patients over a social media advert in which farmers compare their suntans. The advert is subsequently updated so the farmers simply pass each other in the field and no longer compare their tans.
18	ITV announces that the sitcom Kate & Koji has been cancelled after two series.
19	The 2022 Rugby League World Cup, rescheduled from 2021 due to the COVID-19 pandemic, was televised for the final time on the BBC featuring the men's, women's and wheelchair tournaments. From 2026, Premier Sports will take over the subscription television broadcasting rights to show the 2026 Rugby League World Cup when the tournament comes to Australia, New Zealand and Papua New Guinea.
21	2022 FIFA World Cup: BBC One airs England's opening match against Iran, while ITV airs Wales's opening match against the United States. Overnight viewing figures indicate 7.4 million watched England v Iran, while 9.4 million saw the Wales v United States match.
22	The Eurovision Song Contest announces changes to the voting process for 2023, with professional juries removed from the semi-final, and countries not competing in the contest allowed to vote for the first time.
22	Kym Marsh will not participate in the 26 November edition of BBC One's Strictly Come Dancing after testing positive for COVID-19.
23	The Advisory Committee on Business Appointments finds that Matt Hancock broke government rules on post-ministerial jobs by not consulting the watchdog before joining I'm A Celebrity...Get Me Out of Here!, but its chairman, Eric Pickles, advises it would be disproportionate to take action against him.
23	Appearing on BBC Radio 4's The Media Show, BBC football presenter Gary Lineker says he and the BBC should have spoken out more about human rights issues during the 2018 FIFA World Cup in Russia, and describes the event as a case of sportswashing.
24	Leo Jones, who appeared in the fly-on-the-wall documentary series Airline, is given a five-year restraining order and a six-month suspended prison sentence following a hearing at St Albans Magistrates in which he pleaded guilty to stalking GB News presenter Ellie Costello.
26	Former Health Secretary Matt Hancock reaches the final of I'm a Celebrity...Get Me Out of Here! along with footballer Jill Scott and actor Owen Warner.
27	Jill Scott wins the 22nd series of I'm a Celebrity...Get Me Out of Here!; Owen Warner finishes in second place, with Matt Hancock third.
28	BBC News have hired former GB News editorial director John McAndrew as director of news.
29	The BBC announces changes to its complaints procedure to make the process easier to navigate and more transparent.
29	The Blackpool tram seen in a 1989 episode of Coronation Street in which the character Alan Bradley is hit and killed by a tram as he chases Rita Fairclough is to be housed at Blackpool's Tramtown Museum after funds were raised to move it there.
29	2022 FIFA World Cup: BBC One airs England's World Cup game against Wales in which England defeat Wales 3–0. Overnight viewing figures published the next day indicate the game is watched by an average audience of 16.59 million viewers.
30	Ofcom publishes its annual report on the BBC, and notes that the broadcaster is not doing enough for people on lower incomes, who feel less satisfied with the BBC.

=== December ===
Date	Event
2	Former Health Secretary Matt Hancock returns to Westminster following his participation in I'm a Celebrity...Get Me Out of Here!.
5	Press Gazette reports that TalkTV plans to move its Piers Morgan Uncensored and Jeremy Kyle Live shows from studios at Ealing to The News Building at London Bridge.
6	Matt Lucas announces he will step down as presenter of The Great British Bake Off after three series.
8	ITV completes the roll out of ITVX, the network's new streaming platform, replacing the old catch-up service ITV Hub.
10	BBC One airs "Thin Green Line", the first improvised episode of its medical drama Casualty, which highlights real-life pressures facing NHS paramedics.
10	2022 FIFA World Cup: ITV airs the quarter-final match between England and France in which France beat England 2–1. The game is watched by an average audience of 19.4 million, with a peak audience of 21.31 million.
11	Lissandro, representing France, wins the 2022 Junior Eurovision Song Contest with his entry, "Oh maman!". Freya Skye, representing the United Kingdom, finishes in fifth place, whilst also coming first with the online vote.
13	Top Gear presenter Freddie Flintoff is taken to hospital after he was hurt in an accident while filming for the series.
17	Wildlife presenter Hamza Yassin and his professional dance partner Jowita Przystal win the 20th series of Strictly Come Dancing.
18	Both BBC One and ITV air the 2022 FIFA World Cup Final between Argentina and France, which sees a 3–3 draw and Argentina win on penalties. The BBC coverage of the game is watched by 14.9 million viewers, while ITV's coverage draws an audience of 4.3 million.
19	Lionel Messi, captain of the Argentina national football team, is named the 2022 BBC Sports Personality World Sport Star of the Year.
20	ITV has said there are no plans to replace Jeremy Clarkson as presenter of Who Wants to Be a Millionaire? "at the moment" following a column he wrote for The Sun in which he described how he would like to see the Duchess of Sussex humiliated. Kevin Lygo, the company's head of media and entertainment, described the comments as "awful" and said they do not represent the views of ITV.
21	England and Arsenal forward Beth Mead is named the 2022 BBC Sports Personality of the Year.
21	Singer Bob Dylan has been offered a cameo role in Coronation Street after revealing in an interview with The Wall Street Journal that he is a fan of the soap. He will appear in a storyline involving an open mic night at the Rovers Return Inn.
21	The News Movement confirms that Becca Hutson, GB News' former head of digital who left the channel in October, is joining to become their UK head of news.
24	BBC One airs a film adaptation of The Boy, the Mole, the Fox and the Horse, a 2019 children's story by Charlie Mackesy. It is also released on Apple TV+ the following day.
25	King Charles praises "wonderfully kind people" helping those in need and sympathises with struggling families in his first Christmas broadcast. Carried across several channels; it attracts 10.7 million live viewers. It is most watched programme on Christmas Day 2022, and also the most watched Christmas broadcast by a British monarch in the two decades that live TV viewing records have been kept.
25	A Doctor Who trailer is released, giving viewers a preview of the series' plans for its 60th anniversary in 2023.
25	Danny Dyer's final EastEnders episode as Mick Carter airs as the character disappears at sea while trying to rescue ex-wife Linda Carter (Kellie Bright). He is believed to have died.
25	"Shining Mammy", the Christmas 2022 special of Mrs Brown's Boys is watched by 2.4 million, but panned on social media for its storyline in which the character Cathy Brown (played by Jennifer Gibney) begins dating an Englishman who is suspected of being a vampire.
30	Among those from the world of television to be recognised in the 2023 New Year Honours are comedian Frank Skinner who receives an MBE, actor Stephen Graham who receives an OBE, and actor and presenter David Harewood who also receives an OBE. Journalist and newsreader John Suchet, and saxophonist and CBeebies presenter YolanDa Brown also receive OBEs, while Countdown presenter Rachel Riley receives an MBE.
31	TalkTV have formed a partnership with Local TV Limited to provide local and national news output to their network of eight regional television channels.
31	BBC One's New Year's Eve schedule includes Sam Ryder Rocks New Year's Eve from 11.30pm, with a break at midnight for London's annual New Year fireworks display. Het Grote Songfestivalfeest (renamed The Big Eurovision Party for UK viewers) follows Sam Ryder at 12.45am and is presented by Rylan Clark.

== Debuts ==
=== BBC ===
Date	Debut	Channel
1 January	The Tourist	BBC One
1 January	This is Joan Collins	BBC Two
3 January	Four Lives	BBC One
4 January	Toast of Tinseltown	BBC Two
9 January	The Green Planet	BBC One
10 January	Van Gogh – Life and Art	BBC Four
11 January	Rules of the Game	BBC One
24 January	Great Coastal Railway Journeys	BBC Two
24 January	The Nilsen Files	BBC Two
24 January	The Responder	BBC One
26 January	We Are England	BBC One
1 February	Lazy Susan	BBC Three
1 February	RuPaul's Drag Race: UK vs. the World	BBC Three
6 February	Chloe	BBC One
6 February	Dodger	CBBC
8 February	Cheaters	BBC One
8 February	This Is Going to Hurt	BBC One
9 February	The Fast and the Farmer-ish	BBC Three
14 February	Rebel Cheer Squad	BBC iPlayer
16 February	Gassed Up	BBC Three
1 March	Mood	BBC Three
6 March	Silverpoint	CBBC
7 March	Life and Death in the Warehouse	BBC Three
8 March	The Witchfinder	BBC Two
14 March	Bridge of Lies	BBC One
21 March	Then Barbara Met Alan	BBC Two
12 April	Freeze the Fear with Wim Hof	BBC One
19 April	Life After Life	BBC Two
25 April	Peacock	BBC Three
29 April	Here We Go	BBC One
2 May	Floodlights	BBC Two
15 May	Conversations with Friends	BBC Three
16 May	The Chris & Rosie Ramsey Show	BBC Two
7 June	Everything I Know About Love	BBC One
7 June	Hungry for It	BBC Three
10 June	Avoidance	BBC One
10 June	My Name is Leon	BBC Two
13 June	Sherwood	BBC One
6 July	Stunners	BBC Three
17 July	The Control Room	BBC One
20 July	Maryland	BBC Two
14 August	Marriage	BBC One
15 August	Red Rose	BBC Three
4 September	Sunday with Laura Kuenssberg	BBC One
11 September	Frozen Planet II	BBC One
12 September	Colourblocks	CBeebies
20 September	Crossfire	BBC One
23 September	Am I Being Unreasonable?	BBC One
26 September	Inside Man	BBC One
26 September	Stuck	BBC Two
5 October	Ralph & Katie	BBC One
6 October	Unbreakable	BBC One
9 October	Wreck	BBC Three
24 October	The Wedding	BBC iPlayer
30 October	SAS: Rogue Heroes	BBC One
31 October	The Travelling Auctioneers	BBC One
10 November	The English	BBC Two
25 November	How This Blind Girl...	BBC Two Wales
29 November	The Traitors	BBC One
1 December	Granite Harbour	BBC Scotland
16 December	Gangsta Granny Strikes Again!	CBBC
17 December	That's My Jam	BBC One
24 December	The Boy, the Mole, the Fox And the Horse	BBC One
25 December	The Smeds and The Smoos	BBC One
28 December	Mayflies	BBC One
29 December	Marie Antoinette	BBC Two

=== ITV ===
Date	Debut	Channel
2 January	Anne	ITV
8 January	Ant & Dec's Limitless Win	ITV
8 January	The John Bishop Show	ITV
11 January	The Secret Life of Our Pets	ITV
13 January	Martin Clunes: Islands of the Pacific	ITV
23 January	Trigger Point	ITV
7 February	No Return	ITV
12 February	Starstruck	ITV
22 February	Kate Garraway: Caring for Derek	ITV
6 March	The Ipcress File	ITV
7 March	Our House	ITV
14 March	Holding	ITV
17 March	Joanna Lumley's Great Cities of the World	ITV
28 March	Deep Heat	ITV2
9 April	The 1% Club	ITV
16 April	Garraway's Good Stuff	ITV
16 April	Romeo & Duet	ITV
17 April	Big Zuu's Breakfast Show	ITV
17 April	The Thief, His Wife and the Canoe	ITV
2 May	DI Ray	ITV
12 June	Vick Hope's Breakfast Show	ITV
5 July	Olivia Atwood: Getting Filthy Rich	ITV2
7 August	Katie Piper's Breakfast Show	ITV
28 August	Ridley	ITV
29 August	Fastest Finger First	ITV
29 August	The Suspect	ITV
4 September	Celebrity Lingo	ITV
19 September	Lloyd of the Flies	CITV
25 September	Karen Pirie	ITV
26 September	Bad Chefs	ITV2
3 October	The Walk-In	ITV
24 October	Riddiculous	ITV
5 November	Queens for the Night	ITV
8 December	The Confessions of Frannie Langton	ITVX
8 December	A Spy Among Friends	ITVX
8 December	Tell Me Everything	ITVX
15 December	Litvinenko	ITVX
22 December	Riches	ITVX
22 December	A Year on Planet Earth	ITVX
24 December	Britain Get Singing	ITV
28 December	Without Sin	ITVX
28 December	Loaded in Paradise	ITVX

=== Channel 4 ===
Date	Debut	Channel
4 January	The Language of Love	Channel 4
6 January	Screw	Channel 4
26 January	Katie Price's Mucky Mansion	Channel 4
31 January	The Great Cookbook Challenge	Channel 4
6 February	The Curse	Channel 4
7 February	60 Days with the Gypsies	Channel 4
16 February	Gemma Collins: Self-Harm & Me	Channel 4
21 February	The Real Dirty Dancing	E4
13 March	One and Six Zeros	Channel 4
22 March	The Simpler Life	Channel 4
27 March	The Great Big Tiny Design Challenge	More4
1 April	Open House: The Great Sex Experiment	Channel 4
3 April	Inside The Superbrands	Channel 4
12 April	Hullraisers	Channel 4
21 April	Chivalry	Channel 4
8 May	The Andrew Neil Show	Channel 4
13 May	Let's Make a Love Scene	Channel 4
15 May	Y Golau	S4C
23 May	Teen Mum Academy	E4
26 May	Big Boys	Channel 4
15 June	Becoming Elizabeth	Channel 4
19 June	Suspect	Channel 4
24 June	One Question	Channel 4
27 June	Come Dine with Me: The Professionals	Channel 4
30 June	The Undeclared War	Channel 4
12 July	Night Coppers	Channel 4
25 July	Help! We Bought a Village	Channel 4
5 September	Celeb Cooking School	E4
27 September	Make Me Prime Minister	Channel 4
30 September	Don't Hug Me I'm Scared	Channel 4
3 October	The Big Blow Out	E4
13 October	I Hate You	Channel 4
16 October	Somewhere Boy	Channel 4
20 October	Aldi's Next Big Thing	Channel 4
3 November	The Horne Section TV Show	All 4
22 November	You Won't Believe This	Channel 4
21 December	Vardy v Rooney: A Courtroom Drama	Channel 4
29 December	Prince Andrew: The Musical	Channel 4

=== Channel 5 ===
Date	Debut	Channel
6 January	Our Great Yorkshire Life	Channel 5
31 January	The Teacher	Channel 5
1 March	The Holiday	Channel 5
5 April	Deadline	Channel 5
12 April	Compulsion	Channel 5
18 July	Witness No.3	Channel 5
10 October	Maxine	Channel 5
17 October	The House Across the Street	Channel 5
27 December	Riptide	Channel 5

=== Sky ===
Date	Debut	Channel
10 February	The Fear Index	Sky Atlantic
11 February	Little Darlings	Sky Kids
14 February	The Big Design Challenge	Sky Arts
22 April	The Rising	Sky Max
2 June	The Midwich Cuckoos	Sky Max
16 June	The Lazarus Project	Sky Max
7 July	The Baby	Sky Atlantic
28 September	This England	Sky Atlantic
3 November	Jamie and Harry's World Cup Challenge: Got Got Need	Sky Max
7 December	Rosie Molloy Gives Up Everything	Sky Comedy
23 December	Red Riding Hood: After Ever After	Sky Max
24 December	Christmas Carole	Sky Max

=== Other channels ===
Date	Debut	Channel
27 January	Hotel Portofino	BritBox
4 February	Suspicion	Apple TV+
6 February	The Heritage Chart Show	Local TV/Talking Pictures TV
10 February	Magpie Murders	BritBox
1 March	Murder in Provence	BritBox
28 March	Newark, Newark	Gold
1 April	The Last Bus	Netflix
1 April	Slow Horses	Apple TV+
6 April	Jimmy Savile: A British Horror Story	Netflix
12 April	Hard Cell	Netflix
12 April	Why Didn't They Ask Evans?	BritBox
15 April	Anatomy of a Scandal	Netflix
16 April	Ministry of Offence	GB News
22 April	Heartstopper	Netflix
25 April	Piers Morgan Uncensored	TalkTV
28 April	Ten Percent	Amazon Prime Video
5 May	The Dry	BritBox
13 May	The Essex Serpent	Apple TV+
23 May	Prehistoric Planet	Apple TV+
31 May	Pistol	Disney+ / Star
24 June	Man vs. Bee	Netflix
13 July	Sneakerhead	Dave
19 August	Bad Sisters	Apple TV+
23 August	The Other Half	Dave
24 August	Dead Canny	Dave
25 August	Holier Than Thou	Dave
25 August	Welcome to Wrexham	Disney+ / Star
26 August	Perfect	Dave
8 September	Wedding Season	Disney+ / Star
30 September	Jungle	Amazon Prime Video
10 October	Jeremy Kyle Live	TalkTV
12 October	The Ex-Wife	Paramount+
28 October	The Devil's Hour	Amazon Prime Video
28 October	The Bastard Son & The Devil Himself	Netflix
9 November	Save Our Squad with David Beckham	Disney+ / Star
11 November	Mammals	Amazon Prime Video
28 November	We Are Not Alone	Dave
1 December	The Flatshare	Paramount+
2 December	Three Pines	Amazon Prime Video
26 December	Treason	Netflix

== Channels and streaming services ==
=== New channels ===
Date	Channel
1 February	BBC Three (relaunch)
31 March	MTV 80s
31 March	MTV 90s
13 April	That's TV Music
25 April	TalkTV
29 June	E4 Extra
26 October	RealityXtra2
27 December	Now Rock

=== New streaming services ===
Date	Channel
11 January	Dazzler+
22 June	Paramount+
1 November	Viaplay
17 November	ITVX

=== Defunct channels/streaming services ===
Date	Channel
2 March	RT UK
30 March	Syfy +1
30 March	Pick +1
31 March	MTV Classic
31 March	MTV Base
29 June	Box Hits
30 June	Forces TV
9 November	Now 90s
8 December	ITV Hub (Phased out from 17 November)
15 December	BoxNation

=== Rebranding channels/streaming services ===
Date	Old name	New name
19 January	Paramount Network	5Action
28 April	IMDb TV	Amazon Freevee
30 June	CBS Drama	RealityXtra
30 June	CBS Justice	HorrorXtra
30 June	Horror Channel	Legend
30 June	That's TV Music	Classic Hits
26 July	Syfy	Sky Sci-Fi
29 September	Starzplay	Lionsgate+
15 November	ITV	ITV1

== Television programmes ==
=== Changes of network affiliation ===
Programme	Moved from	Moved to
Bull	Fox	Sky Witness
NCIS: Los Angeles	Sky One	Sky Max
A Discovery of Witches	Sky One	Sky Max
Magnum P.I.	Sky One	Sky Max
The Blacklist	Sky One	Sky Max
Frayed	Sky One	Sky Max
Resident Alien	Sky One	Sky Max
The Flight Attendant	Sky One	Sky Max
The Simpsons (First run rights)	Sky One	Sky Showcase
Bloods	Sky One	Sky Comedy
Avenue 5	Sky One	Sky Comedy
Breeders	Sky One	Sky Comedy
Upright	Sky One	Sky Comedy
Outlander	Amazon Prime Video	StarzPlay
This Is Us	Amazon Prime Video	Disney+
9–1–1	Sky Witness	Disney+
9-1-1: Lone Star	Sky Witness	Disney+
Grey's Anatomy	Sky Witness	Disney+
Station 19	Sky Witness	Disney+
The Resident	Sky Witness	Disney+
Atlanta	Fox	Disney+
Mayans MC	BBC Two	Disney+
What We Do in the Shadows	BBC Two	Disney+
Bob's Burgers	Comedy Central	Disney+
Daredevil	Netflix	Disney+
Jessica Jones	Netflix	Disney+
Luke Cage	Netflix	Disney+
Iron Fist	Netflix	Disney+
The Defenders	Netflix	Disney+
The Punisher	Netflix	Disney+
RuPaul's Drag Race	Netflix	WOW Presents Plus
Star Trek: Discovery	Netflix	Paramount+
Yellowstone	Paramount Network	Paramount+
City On A Hill	Sky Atlantic	Paramount+
The L Word: Generation Q	Sky Atlantic	Paramount+
Flatbush Misdemeanors	Sky Comedy	Paramount+
Sanditon	ITV	BritBox
Staged	BBC One	BritBox
Toast of London	Channel 4	BBC Two
The Handmaid's Tale	Channel 4	Amazon Prime Video
When Calls the Heart	Movies 24	Hallmark TV
Batwoman	E4	E4 Extra
The Next Step	CBBC	BBC Three

=== Returning this year after a break of one year or longer ===
Programme	Date(s) of original removal	Original channel(s)	Date of return	New channel(s)
Celebrity Coach Trip	24 January 2020	E4	3 January 2022	N/A (same channel as original)
You Are What You Eat	18 October 2006	Channel 4	5 January 2022	Channel 5
The Apprentice	18 December 2019	BBC One	6 January 2022	N/A (same channel as original)
Watercolour Challenge	23 November 2001	Channel 4	17 January 2022	Channel 5
Big Cook Little Cook	25 December 2006	CBeebies	28 February 2022	N/A (same channel as original)
Derry Girls	9 April 2019	Channel 4	12 April 2022	N/A (same channel as original)
Britain's Got Talent	10 October 2020	ITV	16 April 2022	N/A (same channel as original)
The Games	25 March 2006	Channel 4	9 May 2022	ITV
Doc Martin	13 November 2019	ITV	7 September 2022	N/A (same channel as original)
Ninja Warrior UK	1 June 2019	ITV	10 September 2022	N/A (same channel as original)
Beauty and the Geek	14 March 2006	E4	25 September 2022	Discovery+
Teletubbies	16 February 2001; 12 October 2018	BBC Two; CBeebies	14 November 2022	Netflix
Junior Eurovision Song Contest	26 November 2005; 24 November 2019	ITV; S4C	11 December 2022	BBC One, CBBC

== Continuing television programmes ==
=== 1920s ===
Programme	Date
BBC Wimbledon	(1927–1939, 1946–2019, 2021–present)

=== 1930s ===
Programme	Date
The Boat Race	(1938–1939, 1946–2019, 2021–present)
BBC Cricket	(1939, 1946–1999, 2020–present)

=== 1950s ===
Programme	Date
Panorama	(1953–present)
Eurovision Song Contest	(1956–2019, 2021–present)
The Sky at Night	(1957–present)
Final Score	(1958–present)
Blue Peter	(1958–present)

=== 1960s ===
Programme	Date
Coronation Street	(1960–present)
Points of View	(1961–present)
Songs of Praise	(1961–present)
University Challenge	(1962–1987, 1994–present)
Doctor Who	(1963–1989, 1996, 2005–present)
Horizon	(1964–present)
Match of the Day	(1964–present)
Top of the Pops	(1964–2006, 2006–present) (Christmas specials only)
Gardeners' World	(1968–present)
Question of Sport	(1968, 1970–present)

=== 1970s ===
Programme	Date
Emmerdale	(1972–present)
Mastermind (including Celebrity Mastermind)	(1972–1997, 2003–present)
Newsround	(1972–present)
Football Focus	(1974–present)
Pobol y Cwm	(1974–present)
Arena	(1975–present)
One Man and His Dog	(1976–present)
Top Gear	(1977–2001, 2002–2022)
Ski Sunday	(1978–present)
Blankety Blank	(1979–1990, 1997–2002, 2016, 2020–present)
Antiques Roadshow	(1979–present)
Question Time	(1979–present)

=== 1980s ===
Programme	Date
Children in Need	(1980–present)
See Hear	(1981–present)
Countdown	(1982–present)
ITV Breakfast	(1983–present)
EastEnders	(1985–present)
Comic Relief	(1988–present)
Catchphrase	(1986–2002, 2013–present)
Casualty	(1986–present)
Red Dwarf	(1988–1999, 2009, 2012–present)
This Morning	(1988–present)
Countryfile	(1988–present)

=== 1990s ===
Programme	Date
Have I Got News for You	(1990–present)
MasterChef	(1990–2001, 2005–present)
You've Been Framed!	(1990–2022)
The Big Breakfast	(1992–2002, 2021–2022)
ITV News Meridian	(1993–present)
Soccer AM	(1994–2023)
Hollyoaks	(1995–present)
National Television Awards	(1995–2008, 2010–present)
Silent Witness	(1996–present)
Never Mind the Buzzcocks	(1996–2015, 2021–present)
Midsomer Murders	(1997–present)
Y Clwb Rygbi	(1997–present)
Classic Emmerdale	(1998–2004, 2019–present)
Who Wants to Be a Millionaire?	(1998–2014, 2018–present)
The British Soap Awards	(1999–2019, 2022–2023, 2025)
Holby City	(1999–2022)
Loose Women	(1999–present)

=== 2000s ===
Programme	Date
2000
Bargain Hunt	(2000–present)
BBC Breakfast	(2000–present)
Click	(2000–present)
Doctors	(2000–present)
A Place in the Sun	(2000–present)
Unreported World	(2000–present)
2001
BBC South East Today	(2001–present)
2002
Escape to the Country	(2002–present)
I'm a Celebrity...Get Me Out of Here!	(2002–present)
Ant & Dec's Saturday Night Takeaway	(2002–2009, 2013–present)
Most Haunted	(2002–2010, 2014–present)
River City	(2002–2026)
Saturday Kitchen	(2002–present)
2003
QI	(2003–present)
Eggheads	(2003–present)
Homes Under the Hammer	(2003–present)
Traffic Cops	(2003–present)
Junior Eurovision Song Contest	(2003–2005, 2018–2019, 2022–present)
2004
Match of the Day 2	(2004–present)
Strictly Come Dancing	(2004–present)
The Big Fat Quiz of the Year	(2004–present)
The Gadget Show	(2004–present)
Live at the Apollo	(2004–present)
Newswatch	(2004–present)
Strictly Come Dancing: It Takes Two	(2004–present)
Who Do You Think You Are?	(2004–present)
Doc Martin	(2004–2007, 2009–2019, 2022)
Peppa Pig	(2004–present)
2005
8 Out of 10 Cats	(2005–present)
The Andrew Marr Show	(2005–present)
The Adventure Show	(2005–present)
Dragons' Den	(2005–present)
The Hotel Inspector	(2005–present)
Pocoyo	(2005–present)
Mock the Week	(2005–2022)
Springwatch	(2005–present)
2006
The Apprentice: You're Fired!	(2006–present)
Banged Up Abroad	(2006–present)
Dancing on Ice	(2006–2014, 2018–present)
Dickinson's Real Deal	(2006–present)
Horrid Henry	(2006–present)
Monkey Life	(2006–present)
Not Going Out	(2006–present)
The One Show	(2006–present)
Peschardt's People	(2006–present)
2007
Would I Lie to You?	(2007–present)
Don't Tell the Bride	(2007–present)
The Graham Norton Show	(2007–present)
Shaun the Sheep	(2007–present)
2008
An Là	(2008–present)
Celebrity Juice	(2008–present)
Chuggington	(2008–present)
Police Interceptors	(2008–present)
Seachd Là	(2008–present)
Soccer Aid	(2008, 2010, 2012, 2014, 2016, 2018–present)
2009
Pointless	(2009–present)
The Chase	(2009–present)
Kate Garraway's Life Stories	(2009–present)
Rip Off Britain	(2009–present)

=== 2010s ===
Programme	Date
2010
Celebrity Coach Trip	(2010–2012, 2019–2020, 2022–present)
The Great British Bake Off	(2010–present)
Great British Railway Journeys	(2010–present)
Lorraine	(2010–present)
The Only Way Is Essex	(2010–present)
Sunday Morning Live	(2010–present)
2011
Junior Bake Off	(2011, 2013, 2015–2016, 2019, 2021–present)
Made in Chelsea	(2011–present)
24 Hours in A&E	(2011–present)
Scotland Tonight	(2011–present)
The Jonathan Ross Show	(2011–present)
Top Boy	(2011–2013, 2019, 2022–2023)
Vera	(2011–2025)
2012
8 Out of 10 Cats Does Countdown	(2012–present)
Endeavour	(2012–2023)
Call the Midwife	(2012–present)
Stand Up To Cancer	(2012–present)
The Voice UK	(2012–present)
Tipping Point	(2012–present)
Paul O'Grady: For the Love of Dogs	(2012–2023)
2013
The Dumping Ground	(2013–present)
Shetland	(2013–present)
Two Doors Down	(2013, 2016–present)
Peaky Blinders	(2013–2014, 2016–2017, 2019, 2022)
2014
Agatha Raisin	(2014–present)
Good Morning Britain	(2014–present)
Grantchester	(2014–present)
STV News at Six	(2014–present)
The Great British Bake Off: An Extra Slice	(2014–present)
2015
Hunted	(2015–present)
Love Island	(2015–present)
SAS: Who Dares Wins	(2015–present)
Taskmaster	(2015–present)
Travel Man	(2015–present)
The Last Kingdom	(2015–2022)
2016
Bake Off: The Professionals	(2016–present)
Celebs Go Dating	(2016–present)
The Crown	(2016–present)
Naked Attraction	(2016–present)
2017
Ackley Bridge	(2017–2022)
Frankie Boyle's New World Order	(2017–2022)
The Good Karma Hospital	(2017–2022)
Love Island: Aftersun	(2017–present)
The Voice Kids	(2017–2023)
The Playlist	(2017–2022)
The Repair Shop	(2017–present)
Richard Osman's House of Games	(2017–present)
Strike	(2017–present)
2018
Britannia	(2018–present)
Derry Girls	(2018–2022)
A Discovery of Witches	(2018–2022)
Killing Eve	(2018–2022)
Mark Kermode's Secrets of Cinema	(2018–present)
Peston	(2018–present)
Pilgrimage (TV series)	(2018–present)
Shakespeare & Hathaway: Private Investigators	(2018–2022)
Stath Lets Flats	(2018–present)
2019
Glow Up: Britain's Next Make-Up Star	(2019–present)
The Hit List	(2019–present)
Ladhood	(2019–2022)
Mandy	(2019–present)
RuPaul's Drag Race UK	(2019–present)
Sex Education	(2019–present)
After Life	(2019–2022)

=== 2020s ===
Programme	Date
2020
Alan Carr's Epic Gameshow	2020–2022
Beat the Chasers	2020–present
Industry	2020–present
It's Pony	2020–2022
Code 404	2020–2022
Malory Towers	2020–present
Mystic	2020–2022
The Wheel	2020–present
The Masked Singer	2020–present
McDonald & Dodds	2020–2024
Noughts + Crosses	2020–2022
Trying	2020–present
2021
Bloods	2021–2022
Cooking with the Stars	2021–present
Hope Street	2021–present
I Can See Your Voice	2021–2022
The Masked Dancer	2021–2022
Secret Crush	2021–2022
Trip Hazard: My Great British Adventure	2021–2022
Unbeatable	2021–2023

== Ending this year ==
Date	Programme	Channel(s)	Debut(s)
5 January	Four Lives	BBC One	2022
5 January	Anne	ITV	2022
14 January	After Life	Netflix	2019
20 January	The 45 Rules of Divorce	MBC 4 / Shahid VIP / Dubai One / OSN / OSN Yahala	2021
21 January	Celebrity Coach Trip	Channel 4 / E4	2010 & 2019
18 February	A Discovery of Witches	Sky Max	2018
27 February	The Good Karma Hospital	ITV	2017
9 March	The Last Kingdom	Netflix	2015
29 March	Holby City	BBC One	1999
2 April	The Wall	BBC One	2019
3 April	Peaky Blinders	BBC One	2013
10 April	Killing Eve	BBC Three	2018
13 April	Kate & Koji	ITV	2020
9 May	The Split	BBC One	2018
13 May	The Games	Channel 4, ITV	2003
18 May	Derry Girls	Channel 4	2018
11 June	Celebrity Karaoke Club	ITV2	2020
15 July	Ackley Bridge	Channel 4	2017
27 August	You've Been Framed!	ITV1	1990
2 September	Fastest Finger First	ITV1	2022
3 September	The Big Breakfast	Channel 4	1992 & 2021
5 September	Ladhood	BBC Three	2019
14 September	Changing Rooms	Channel 4, BBC One & BBC Two	1996 & 2021
24 September	Moneybags	Channel 4	2021
4 October	Inside Man	BBC One	2022
15 October	Dateline London	BBC News & BBC World News	1996
16 October	Frozen Planet II	BBC One	2022
28 October	The Bastard Son & The Devil Himself	Netflix	2022
28 October	Autumnwatch	BBC Two	2005
31 October	The Walk-In	ITV	2022
4 November	Mock the Week	BBC Two	2005
15 December	Celebrity Juice	ITV2	2008
15 December	The English	BBC Two	2022
18 December	Top Gear	BBC One	1977 & 2002
22 December	Vardy v Rooney: A Courtroom Drama	Channel 4	2022
23 December	Motherland	BBC One & BBC Two	2016
24 December	I Can See Your Voice	BBC One	2021
25 December	Doc Martin	ITV	2004 & 2022
25 December	Alan Carr's Epic Gameshow	ITV	2020
29 December	Mayflies	BBC One	2022
30 December	Riptide	Channel 5	2022

== Deaths ==
Date	Name	Age	Broadcast credibility
1 January	Gary Burgess	46	Radio and television presenter (ITV Channel Television)
5 January	George Rossi	60	Scottish actor (The Bill, Roughnecks, The Singing Detective)
9 January	Nicholas Donnelly	83	Actor (Grange Hill, Dixon of Dock Green, Lifeforce)
10 January	Gary Waldhorn	78	Actor (The Vicar of Dibley, Brush Strokes)
11 January	Jana Bennett	66	Television executive (BBC Worldwide)
14 January	Sean Rice	49	Canadian pair skater (Dancing on Ice)
25 January	Barry Cryer	86	Writer (The Two Ronnies, Doctor in the House), comedian and actor
27 January	Andy Devine	79	Actor (Emmerdale, Queer as Folk, Doctors)
29 January	Leonard Fenton	95	Actor (EastEnders)
29 January	Jo Kendall	81	Actress (Emmerdale), comedian and writer
8 February	Bamber Gascoigne	87	Television presenter (University Challenge)
9 February	Joseph Horovitz	95	Composer (Rumpole of the Bailey) and conductor
13 February	Beryl Vertue	90	Television producer (Men Behaving Badly, Sherlock)
16 February	Jack Smethurst	89	Actor and comedian (Love Thy Neighbour)
22 February	Anna Karen	85	Actress (On the Buses, EastEnders)
24 February	Henry Lincoln	92	Writer (Doctor Who) and actor (The Avengers)
1 March	Bob Wellings	87	Television presenter and journalist (Nationwide)
2 March	John Stahl	68	Actor (Game of Thrones, Take the High Road)
3 March	Angela Crow	86	Actress (Coronation Street, Grange Hill, Barney Is My Darling)
4 March	Dai Jones	78	Television presenter (Cefn Gwlad)
5 March	Lynda Baron	82	Actress (Open All Hours, Come Outside, EastEnders)
6 March	Kenneth Ives	87	Actor (Doctor Who) and director (Poldark, Secret Army)
8 March	Ron Pember	87	Actor (Only Fools and Horses, Secret Army), stage director and dramatist
17 March	Peter Bowles	85	Actor (To the Manor Born, Rumpole of the Bailey, The Irish R.M., Only When I Laugh, Executive Stress)
20 March	Ralph Riach	86	Actor (Hamish Macbeth, Lost Empires)
30 March	Tom Parker	33	Singer (The Wanted) and television personality (The Real Full Monty)
3 April	June Brown	95	Actress (EastEnders, Doctor Who, Coronation Street) and author
13 April	Phoebe Frances Brown	29	Actress
21 April	Eric Chappell	88	Television comedy writer, playwright and author (Rising Damp, Home to Roost)
26 April	Ann Davies	87	Actress (Doctor Who, EastEnders)
7 May	Robin Parkinson	92	Actor ('Allo 'Allo!, Button Moon, Twisted Nerve)
8 May	Dennis Waterman	74	Actor (Minder, The Sweeney, Tube Mice, Stay Lucky, On the Up, New Tricks) and singer
15 May	Kay Mellor	71	Actress and writer (Children's Ward, Families, Fat Friends)
28 May	Patricia Brake	79	Actress (Porridge, The Two Ronnies, Coronation Street)
May (announced on 28 May)	Bob Hall		Sports reporter (Central News, Soccer Saturday)
4 June	David Nicholas	92	Television news editor (ITN News)
11 June	Hilary Devey	65	Businesswoman (Dragons' Den)
16 June	Gordon Peters	95	Actor (Dad's Army, Are You Being Served?, One Foot in the Grave)
24 June	Harry Gration	71	Television news presenter (BBC Look North)
26 June	Frank Williams	90	Actor (The Army Game, Dad's Army, You Rang, M'Lord?)
27 June	Jasmine Burkitt	28	Television personality (Small Teen, Bigger World)
2 July	Alain de Cadenet	76	Television presenter (Legends of Motorsport, Victory by Design)
4 July	Mona Hammond	91	Actress (EastEnders, Desmonds, Us Girls, Doctor Who)
9 July	John Gwynne	77	Darts commentator (Sky Sports)
10 July	Michael Barratt	94	Television presenter (Nationwide)
24 July	David Warner	80	Actor (Wallander, Penny Dreadful, Ripper Street, Doctor Who)
27 July	Bernard Cribbins	93	Actor (The Wombles, Fawlty Towers, Doctor Who, Moschops, Jackanory, Old Jack's Boat)
29 July	Michael Redfern	79	Actor (The Newcomers, United!, The Two Ronnies)
2 August	Sam Gannon	31	Actor (Emmerdale)
8 August	Dame Olivia Newton-John	73	Singer and actress (represented the United Kingdom at the 1974 Eurovision Song Contest)
9 August	Raymond Briggs	88	Author and illustrator (The Snowman, Father Christmas, The Bear, Ivor the Invisible, Ethel & Ernest, The Snowman and the Snowdog)
11 August	Darius Campbell Danesh	41	Singer and television participant (Popstars, Pop Idol, Popstar to Operastar)
16 August	Duggie Brown	82	Actor and comedian (Last of the Summer Wine, Coronation Street, The Final Cut)
16 August	Bruce Montague	83	Actor (Butterflies, The Link Men, Hollyoaks)
18 August	Josephine Tewson	91	Actress (The Two Ronnies, Last of the Summer Wine, Keeping Up Appearances)
19 August	Leon Vitali	74	Actor (Softly, Softly, Follyfoot, Z Cars, Public Eye, The Fenn Street Gang, Notorious Woman)
31 August	Bill Turnbull	66	Television presenter and journalist (BBC Breakfast, Songs of Praise, Think Tank)
8 September	Mavis Nicholson	91	Writer and broadcaster
8 September	Gwyneth Powell	76	Actress (Grange Hill)
11 September	Harry Landis	95	Actor (EastEnders, Friday Night Dinner) and stage director
11 September	Kim Lenaghan	61	Broadcaster and author
15 September	Eddie Butler	65	Captain of the Wales national rugby union team, broadcaster and rugby union commentator
18 September	Cherry Valentine	28	Drag performer (RuPaul's Drag Race UK) and nurse
21 September	John Hamblin	87	Television presenter (Play School) and actor (The Restless Years)
2 October	Raymond Allen	82	Screenwriter (Some Mothers Do 'Ave 'Em, Comedy Playhouse, The Little and Large Show)
8 October	Gabrielle Beaumont	80	Television director (Diana: A Tribute to the People's Princess)
11 October	Dame Angela Lansbury	96	Actress (The Manchurian Candidate, Bedknobs and Broomsticks, Murder, She Wrote)
14 October	Robbie Coltrane	72	Actor (Cracker, GoldenEye, Harry Potter films)
20 October	Josephine Melville	60	Actress, director, producer and writer (EastEnders)
5 November	Bill Treacher	92	Actor (EastEnders)
7 November	Tom Owen	73	Actor (Last of the Summer Wine)
7 November	Leslie Phillips	98	Actor (Carry On, Navy Lark, Harry Potter films)
14 November	Sue Baker	75	Journalist and television presenter (Top Gear)
15 November	Veronica Hurst	91	Actress (The Flaxton Boys, General Hospital)
17 November (body discovered on this date)	Nick Fisher	63	Scriptwriter (The Giblet Boys)
21 November	Wilko Johnson	75	Musician and actor (Game of Thrones)
29 November	Derek Granger	101	Television producer (Brideshead Revisited, Bulldog Breed) and screenwriter
9 December	Ruth Madoc	79	Actress (Hi-de-Hi!)
10 December	Victor Lewis-Smith	65	Broadcaster, producer and comedy presenter
11 December	Chris Boucher	79	Screenwriter (Doctor Who, Blake's 7, Shoestring, The Bill, Bergerac, Star Cops)
16 December	Doreen Brownstone	100	Actress (House of Pride)
16 December	Jane Sherwin	88	Actress (Doctor Who, Blake's 7)
17 December	Mike Hodges	90	Screenwriter and director (Dandelion Dead)
18 December	Thea Gregory	96	Actress (The Adventures of the Scarlet Pimpernel)
22 December	Ronan Vibert	58	Actor (The Bill, Agatha Christie's Poirot, Lewis)
23 December	Stephen Greif	78	Actor (Blake's 7, Citizen Smith, Coronation Street, EastEnders, Doctors, The Bill, The Crown)
24 December	John Bird	86	Satirist, actor and comedian (Rory Bremner, Who Else?, Bremner, Bird and Fortune)
26 December	Christian Roberts	78	Actor (Clochemerle, UFO)
28 December	Joan Sydney	86	Actor (When We Are Married, A Country Practice, Neighbours)

== See also ==
- 2022 in the United Kingdom
- 2022 in British music
- 2022 in British radio
- List of British films of 2022
