= Latch Wales =

Welsh cancer charity

Latch Welsh Children's Cancer Charity
- Formation: 1983; 43 years ago
- Founder: Eileen Thompson
- Founded at: University Hospital Llandough
- Registration no.: 04735773
- Headquarters: Noah's Ark Children's Hospital for Wales
- President: Meriel Jenney
- CEO: Menai-Owen Jones
- Website: https://latchwales.org/

Latch Welsh Children's Cancer Charity, more commonly known as Latch Wales, is a cancer charity based in Cardiff, Wales, that provides emotional and financial support for children with cancer. They are based at the Noah's Ark Children's Hospital for Wales in Cardiff, where they have rooms which families of children with cancer can stay in if they are far from home. Anyone who is under the age of 18 and being treated for cancer or leukaemia at the Children's Hospital for Wales is eligible for their services.

They also cover extra expenses such as travel costs, and provide families with social workers to help them receive benefits they're entitled to, as well as organising activities for patients and funding medical resources for cancer patients.

== History ==
Latch Wales was founded in 1983 by a group of families who had children with cancer, as well as oncologist Dr Eileen Thompson. They were originally based in University Hospital Llandough, hence the acronym LATCH meaning "Llandough Aims to Treat Children with Cancer and Leukaemia with Hope". They were responsible for the funding of building the hospital's oncology ward its first CT scanner, a bone marrow transplant room, and community nurses.

Latch moved to Noah's Ark Children's Hospital for Wales in 2004, and raised money to build free accommodation there, providing eight bedrooms, a communal living room, and kitchen for families. Latch were one of three charities to receive £20,600 from a golf tournament held at The Belfry. They were Swansea City's featured charity for their 26 October 2019 match against Cardiff City. Latch spent £1,200,000 to renovate the Rainbow Ward (oncology ward) at Noah's Ark Children's Hospital. The change brought individual rooms to the ward, a playroom for the younger patients and more connected staff areas to provide easier communication for nurses and doctors. In March 2026, Latch announced a partnership with Bluestone National Park Resort in Pembrokeshire, providing holidays for Latch families. The oncology ward at the Children's Hospital for Wales is the only pediatric oncology ward in Wales.

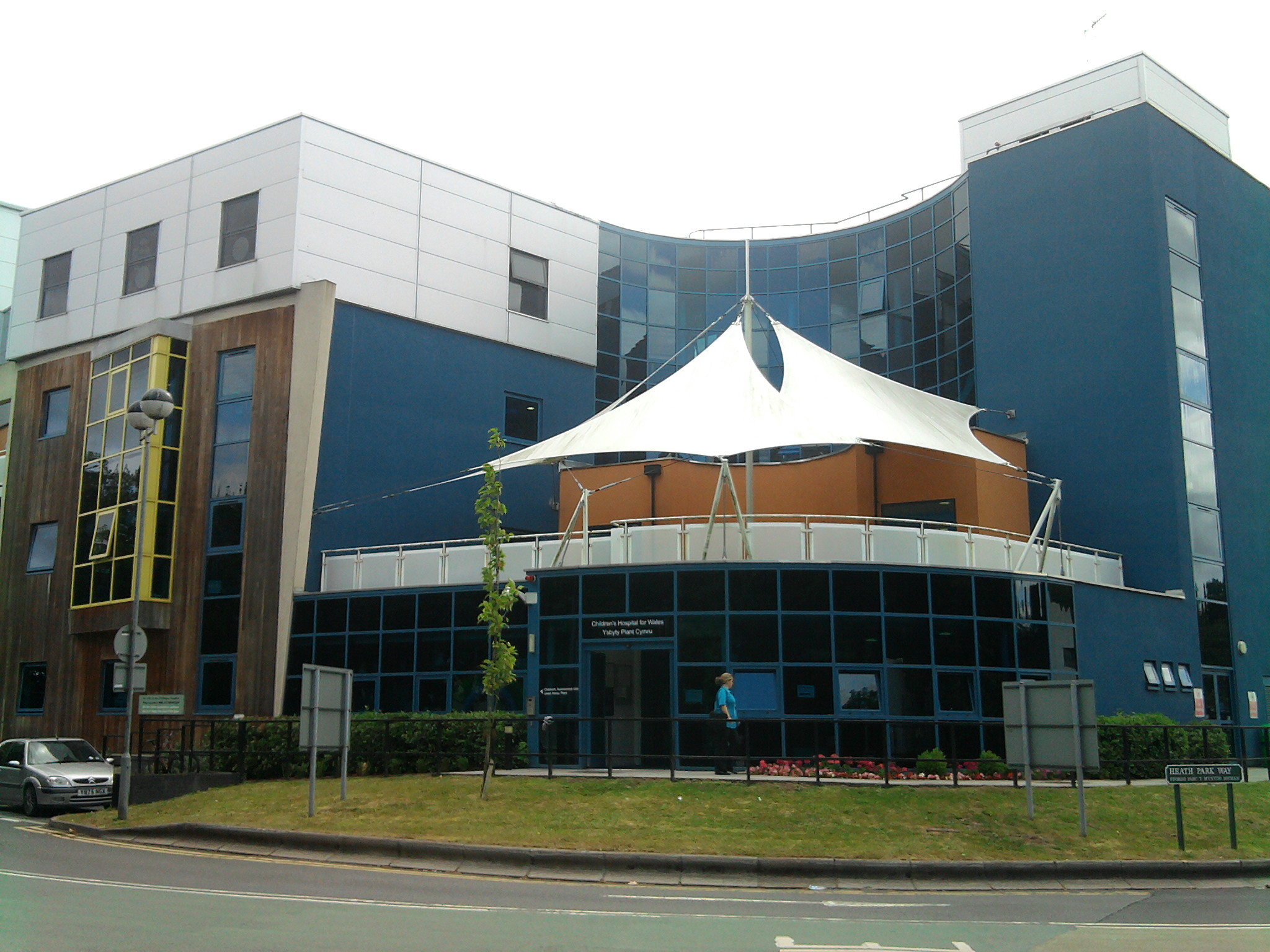
Cardiff Children's Hospital, where Latch Wales operate

In 2025, Latch announced they would be changing their name from LATCH to Latch, as the acronym no longer applied since they were operating at a different hospital. However, they decided to keep the same base name, explaining "we found that the meaning of the word 'Latch' had resonance with (the phrases) 'holding on', 'being with you' and 'togetherness' which very much reflected the essence of the charity today." Their re-brand also added their tagline, which reads 'Here for childhood cancer in Wales', and which is bilingual, also having a Welsh tagline.

== Fundraising ==
A mother raised over £40,000 for the charity in 2022, as well as Ronald McDonald House, in memory of her son, named Morgan, who died of liver cancer. After his death, they set up a cancer charity similar to Latch called Morgan's Army. In October 2022, Holly Proudstreet raised £600 for Latch, as her brother was diagnosed with leukaemia and lymphoma. In 2023, Latch marked their 40-year anniversary with a "40k for 40 years" campaign, in which they encouraged donors to meet a target of £40,000 raised. In October 2023, a group of jockeys at Chepstow Racecourse combined to raise £15,000 for the charity, after horse trainer Christian William's daughter was diagnosed with leukaemia. Ysgol Penglais School was involved in two notable fundraisers for Latch in the summer of 2026, the first when the school organised a 10k run to raise £10,000 for the charity (alongside Teenage Cancer Trust), and the second occurring when a 14-year-old student at the school from Aberystwyth shaved his head to raise money for the charity in solidarity with his friend with Wilms' tumour.

== Patrons ==
- Jonathan Davies - Welsh rugby union player
- Sian Howell - Former charity trustee
- Edward Watts - Deputy lieutenant of Gwent
- Owain Wyn Evans - Welsh television and radio presenter

== See also ==
- Cancer in the United Kingdom
- Cancer Research Wales
