= Cnex =

Animated programme on the Welsh channel S4C

Cnex is an animated satirical programme on the Welsh channel S4C, produced by Cwmni Da and with animation provided by Griffilms. The pilot episode was broadcast in 2003; upon its success a full series was commissioned and first aired in early 2004 on Thursday nights.

== Overview ==
The show was written by Paul Lewis and Keith Rees. Cnex animates Welsh celebrities including, Bryn Terfel, Glyn Wise, Rhodri Morgan, Charlotte Church, Gavin Henson, Dai Jones, Iolo Williams and Siân Lloyd, as well as lampooning international personalities.

The first episode was a Christmas special broadcast on 25 December 2003. The first season began on 9 January 2004, lasting eight episodes.

== Awards ==
- 2004 Celtic TV and Film Festival, Best Light Entertainment Programme (won)
