= Ysgol Penglais School =

Ysgol Penglais
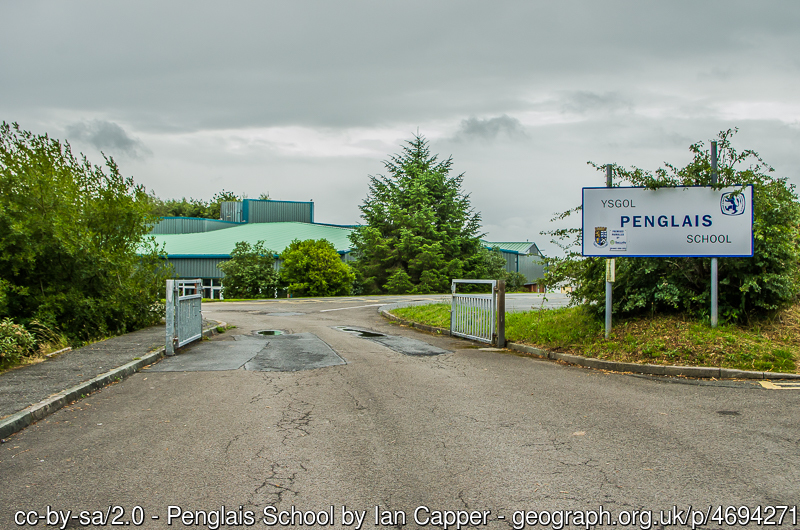
- Rear entrance of the school

Location
- Waunfawr; Aberystwyth, Ceredigion, SY23 3AW; Wales; 52.416°N 4.059°W

Information
- Type: Comprehensive school
- Motto: Dewrder. Cryfder. Calon. (Courage. Strength. Heart.)
- Established: 1973; 53 years ago
- Head teacher: Mair Hughes
- Age range: 11–18
- Enrollment: 1,092 (2022)
- Sixth form students: 261 (2022)
- Language: English
- Colour
- Website: penglais.org.uk

Ysgol Penglais (Welsh for 'Penglais School') is a comprehensive school in the town of Aberystwyth, Ceredigion, West Wales, with about 1,100 pupils aged 11 to 18. The school was established in 1973 and teaches mainly through the medium of English.

== History ==
Built in 1954, Penglais was formerly a secondary modern school, opening as Ysgol Eilradd Dinas / Dinas Secondary Modern School in 1955. The Aberystwyth senior school section at Alexandra Road school was relocated there. The school re-opened as the comprehensive, Ysgol Penglais, in 1973. Expansions took place from 1973 to 1975 to merge the school with the Ardwyn grammar school, with Ardwyn becoming the Welsh medium comprehensive school, Ysgol Penweddig. In 2023, the school celebrated its half-centenary, and launched a local history project.

== Estyn reports ==
An Estyn report following an inspection in March 2019 stated: "Ysgol Penglais is judged to have made sufficient progress in relation to the recommendations following the most recent core inspection." "As a result, Her Majesty's Chief Inspector of Education and Training in Wales is removing the school from the list of schools requiring significant improvement." The previous Estyn report in 2018 had judged the school to be "in need of significant improvement". The 2022 Estyn report states that "Effective leadership and a culture of trust has strengthened the teaching and learning experiences at the school over time", although recommendations stated opportunities for students to use Welsh needed to be improved.

Around 14% of pupils speak Welsh as the predominant language at home, and 21% speak Welsh fluently.

== Charity events ==
The school has supported many charities in the past, including long-standing support for the Sudan Appeal run by UNICEF. In April 2007, there was a huge event in which the entire student body gathered on the main playing field to form a map of the world. This event raised money for the Send my friend to school charity and aimed to increase awareness for the Global Campaign for Education. The event was photographed by the Royal Commission on the Ancient and Historical Monuments of Wales. In 2026, the school aimed to raise over £10,000 for Teenage Cancer Trust and Latch Wales in support of two students fighting cancer.

== Notable former pupils ==
- Tom Bradshaw, footballer
- Martin Conway (historian)
- Taron Egerton, actor
- Josh Hathaway, rugby player
- Andy John, Bishop of Bangor (2008–27 June 2025) and Archbishop of Wales (2021–27 June 2025)
- Dai Jones (Dai Jones Llanilar), television and radio presenter and author, attended the former Ysgol Dinas.
- Rhys Norrington-Davies, footballer
- Malcolm Pryce, author
- Jane Stanness, actress
