= Martin Conway (historian) =

British historian (born 1960)

professor Martin Conway FRHistS
- Born: Martin Herbert Conway; 1960 (age 65–66); Aberystwyth, Wales
- Known for: European history
- Title: Professor of Contemporary European History
- Spouse: Denise Cripps
- Children: 1

Academic background
- Education: Ysgol Penglais School
- Alma mater: Wadham College, Oxford
- Thesis: The Rexist movement in Belgium, 1940–1944
- Doctoral advisor: Richard Cobb

Academic work
- Institutions: Institute of Historical Research; Christ Church, Oxford; Balliol College, Oxford

Martin Herbert Conway (born 1960) is a British historian with a focus on the history of Europe in the 20th century. He is a professor of Contemporary European History at the University of Oxford. His research has also focused on the political history of Belgium. He is the MacLellan-Warburg Fellow and a Tutor at Balliol College, Oxford, and a Fellow of Aberystwyth University. Conway is also a researcher on the history of democracy.

== Early life ==
Conway was born and raised in Aberystwyth. He attended Ysgol Penglais School. He was an only child. He was an undergraduate and graduate student at Wadham College, Oxford. His doctoral thesis was supervised by Richard Cobb.

== Career ==
Conway's post-doctoral career began with a one-year scholarship from the Institute of Historical Research before he was elected to a Junior Research Fellowship at Christ Church, Oxford in 1987. He was subsequently elected to a Tutorial Fellowship in History at Balliol College, Oxford in 1990, succeeding Colin Lucas. In November 2014 he was awarded the Title of Distinction of Professor of Contemporary European History by the University of Oxford.

Conway has held multiple roles within Oxford, including chair of the Board of the Faculty of History and Associate Head of the Humanities Division. He is also a Visiting Fellow to Princeton University. He sits on the Academic Advisory Council of Heidelberg University.

During his career, he has spoken at the National WWI Museum and Memorial, Princeton University, and Edge Hill University.

In 2026, Conway was awarded the Siegfried Landshut Prize by the Hamburg Institute for Social Research for his "learned but always comparatively-oriented analysis of political and social alliances, the breadth of his contributions to diverse fields of study of political, religious and gender history, and his public contributions to scholarship".

The Institute's prize announcement declared Conway "one of the most innovative historians of the history of Europe in the twentieth century", pointing to two key publications which made his scholarly reputation. The first, The Sorrows of Belgium (2012), "studies how during and after the German occupation, a new state order emerged out of the conflicts between former elites, the exile government in London, and the resistance movements". The second, Western Europe's Democratic Age (2020), covered postwar European history up to 1968 and analysed "in an elegant but also unexpected manner the continuities and ruptures which characterised this era".

== Affiliations ==
Conway is on the Journal of Belgian History International Advisory Board.

== Personal life ==
Conway is married to Denise Cripps, a publisher based in Oxford, and they have a son together, Nick, born in 2000.

In May 2016, Conway was one of 300 prominent historians, including Simon Schama and Niall Ferguson, who were signatories to a letter to The Guardian, telling voters that if they chose to leave the European Union on 23 June, they would be condemning Britain to irrelevance.

== Bibliography ==
- Collaboration in Belgium: Léon Degrelle and the Rexist movement, 1940–1944 (New Haven: Yale University Press, 1993)
- Catholic politics in Europe, 1918–1945 (London: Routledge, 1997)
- The sorrows of Belgium: liberation and political reconstruction, 1944–1947 (Oxford: Oxford University Press, 2012)
- Western Europe's democratic age, 1945–1968 (Princeton: Princeton University Press, 2020)
