= Small Teen, Bigger World =

Four-part documentary following the life of a teenager with dwarfism

- Genre: Reality TV
- Starring: Jasmine Burkitt; Beverley Burkitt
- Country of origin: United Kingdom

Production
- Running time: 60 minutes

Original release
- Network: BBC Three
- Release: 11 July – 1 August 2011

Small Teen, Bigger World was a four-part documentary following the life of a teenager with dwarfism, Jasmine Burkitt (full name Jasmine Emily Wakefield-Burkitt), and details her family and life. It was the second series to follow Jasmine's life, following the hour-long documentary Small Teen, Big World, which aired in July 2010. Small Teen, Bigger World aired during the summer of 2011, and was part of the 'Extraordinary Me' season on BBC Three.

== Background ==
Jasmine Emily Burkitt (known as Jazz) had restricted growth, but despite being only the height of an average nine-year-old, she was determined to live a normal teenage life. Although she was only 3 ft 11 in (1.19 m), Jasmine had never let her size get in her way. From the age of 13, she cared for her mum, who also had restricted growth. Jasmine stated that a key reason behind participating in the documentary was for people to treat her as they would any other teenager, instead of "treating her like a doll and wanting to treat her like a baby".

Jasmine Burkitt published a biography: Growing Pains: The Inspirational True Story of a Small Girl with Big Dreams (2013, Ebury, ISBN 9780091949600).

Beverley Burkitt died at Glan Clwyd Hospital on 28 December 2013, at the age of 50. Jasmine Burkitt died on 27 June 2022 at the age of 28. Her fiancé, Lewis Burke, announced her death on Facebook, saying that "after a lifelong battle with a severe mental illness, Jasmine has passed away."

=== Small Teen, Big World ===
As part of BBC Three's Adult Season, Small Teen, Big World aired on 27 July 2010 – a one-hour documentary detailing the life of Burkitt and her family. It was watched by 1.1 million viewers, the largest multichannel audience of the night. It also aired on BBC One on 9 September 2010, attracting 2.76 million viewers.

The programme shows Jasmine at home with mum Beverley, her grandparents Norman and Margaret, and out shopping with her best friend Naomi in Llandudno. It reveals what it's like living with her condition while coping with the pressures of teenage life and caring for her mother, who also has respiratory problems. In the run-up to her 16th birthday, Jazz is preparing not only to attend the Little People of America convention in New York City, but also to leave north Wales for the south of England, and meet her real father for the first time. While in New York, she meets others who share her condition and have been attending the conference for years, some of whom have met future partners and fallen in love.

== Episodes ==
Due to the success of Small Teen, Big World, BBC Three commissioned a four-part series following Jasmine and her family – entitled Small Teen, Bigger World, which was part of BBC Three's 'Extraordinary Me' season during the summer of 2011. The series consisted of four episodes, airing between 11 July 2011 and 1 August 2011, each running for an hour.

No.	Title	Directed by	Original release date	UK viewers
1	"My Dad"	Fran Baker	11 July 2011	810,000
Following last year's BBC Three documentary Small Teen, Big World, the series sees Jazz embarking on a life-changing journey by leaving Colwyn Bay to study animal welfare at a residential college. When Jazz was born, mum Bev asked her dad to stay out of their lives due to his drug addiction. While she was growing up, he appeared in a BBC documentary about homelessness, begging and drug addiction. In the first episode, Jazz meets her estranged father for the first time.
2	"My Granddad"	Fran Baker	18 July 2011	621,000
Jazz has found a new boyfriend, Levi, but he's not the only new man in her life. She is also getting to know her newly discovered half-brother Alan. The episode also focuses on Jazz's relationship with her granddad, who is also a father figure to her and has been throughout her life.
3	"My Mum"	Fran Baker	25 July 2011	780,000
Jazz celebrates turning seventeen, and her birthday is extra special as it is the first one she has ever spent with her father Paul. Paul wants to mark the occasion with an extra special gift for his daughter but Bev is horrified when Jazz chooses a snake, which will eventually grow to be bigger than both of them. Jazz is relishing the independence that college has given her but it has come at a cost. Living away from home has put a strain on her relationship with her mother Bev. Jazz and Bev decide to go on holiday to Marrakech for some mother-daughter bonding. They immerse themselves in Moroccan life with traditional hot baths, camel rides and learning to cook the local cuisine, but have to cope with becoming a tourist attraction themselves.
4	"My Changing Life"	Fran Baker	1 August 2011	940,000
Jazz learns to drive in her own specially modified car, and also reveals her growing independence by heading to America alone to fulfil her dream of doing work experience at an animal hospital. Meanwhile, Bev's life is turned upside down when her landlord suddenly announces she has to find a new home. Paul has been back in Jazz's life for a year now and things seem to be going well as he undergoes a full makeover with Bev's help, including his first set of false teeth, and gets himself a job as a volunteer at Colwyn Bay's Mountain Zoo. But a family crisis is about to unfold – Jazz discovers her father has been taking heroin again. Jazz makes the decision to tell her father to stay away until he can control his addiction.
