= Inside Out (2002 TV programme) =

- Genre: News, current affairs
- Presented by: Various
- Country of origin: United Kingdom
- Original language: English

Production
- Running time: 30 minutes

Original release
- Network: BBC One; BBC One HD^{[a]}; BBC News Channel
- Release: 9 September 2002 – 30 March 2020

Related
- BBC Scotland Investigates (1993)

Inside Out is the brand name for a number of regional television programmes in England that were broadcast on BBC One. Each series, made by a BBC region, focuses on stories from the local area. Commissioned by BBC One controller Lorraine Heggessey, the programme began on 9 September 2002 and replaced a number of different titles previously used on BBC Two.

The programme ended on 30 March 2020 and was replaced in 2022 by a new programme, We Are England, which has fewer regional editions and focusses on one subject per edition with regional takes on the chosen subject.

== Versions ==
- Inside Out London – Presented by Sean Fletcher
- Inside Out South East – Presented by Natalie Graham
- Inside Out South – Presented by Jon Cuthill
- Inside Out South West – Presented by Jemma Woodman
- Inside Out West – Presented by Alastair McKee
- Inside Out West Midlands – Presented by Ayo Akinwolere
- Inside Out North West – Presented by Jacey Normand
- Inside Out North East & Cumbria – Presented by Chris Jackson
- Inside Out Yorkshire & Lincolnshire – Presented by Keeley Donovan (September 2017–present)
- Inside Out East Midlands – Presented by Lukwesa Burak.
- Inside Out East – Presented by David Whiteley
- Inside Out Channel Islands – began early 2012
- Inside Out England – Presented by Lukwesa Burak

Inside Out England shows selected stories from the regional programmes and is shown across England which is hosted by Matthew Wright. But this was relaunched in 2016 as Inside Out as a weekly round up on the BBC News channel, with Lukwesa Burak presenting.

== Controversy ==
The East Midlands edition of the show caused controversy in one programme when Ray Gosling claimed to have smothered a former lover who had AIDS. The programme was filmed in December 2009 but only shown in February 2010. A debate over whether the BBC should have told the police before airing the programme followed, with the broadcaster also being accused of promoting assisted suicide. Gosling's claims were later found to be false.

In January 2013, the writer and presenter Chris Geiger investigated a self-styled spiritual healer who claimed to be able to treat cancer using a special diet. Chris Geiger, a cancer survivor himself, used a hidden camera and posed as a client; again this programme provoked widespread debate.

== See also ==
- BBC Scotland Investigates (1993)

== Notes ==
1. ^{a} A different region is selected each week for broadcast on the BBC News Channel.
