= Stuart Ramsay =

British journalist

- Education: University of East Anglia
- Occupation: Foreign correspondent
- Employer: Sky News

Stuart Ramsay is a British journalist who is currently Sky News’ Chief Correspondent. He is Sky's longest serving foreign correspondent.

He graduated from the University of East Anglia in 1985. He received an Honorary Doctorate of Civil Law from his alma mater in 2018.

He has won two Emmy Awards, received four BAFTA nominations, a Monte Carlo Film Award Golden Nymph, London Press Club's Journalist of the Year and three Royal Television Society awards.

== Activities ==
In August 2016, Ramsay reported an arms trading investigation for Sky News.

During the Battle of Mosul, Ramsay was directly next to an ISIL VBIED which exploded while he and his cameraman were recording footage from an Iraqi drone dropping grenades onto ISIL positions. They were unharmed, however upwards of 20-30 Iraqi soldiers may have been killed, as well as multiple vehicles including a Humvee and a main battle tank being destroyed.

In March 2020, he was the first TV journalist to report from inside a hospital affected by the COVID-19 pandemic in Italy. The news report won several awards, including the International News Emmy. The British Journalism Review said the "reporting of Sky's Stuart Ramsay, Dominique van Heerden, Garwen McLuckie and Simone Baglivo from Bergamo in March is credited with jolting the UK government towards lockdown. The images of a health service in prosperous Western Europe overrun travelled around the world. It was a brilliant, courageous and utterly traditional television scoop. The Sky team were the first to film something vital unfolding".

In August 2021 he reported from the Afghan capital during the Fall of Kabul.

On 28 February 2022 he was shot and wounded while reporting near Kyiv during the Russian invasion of Ukraine.

In July 2023, he filed a report from inside the conflict zones of eastern Myanmar.

In August 2025, he revealed footages of Israeli settlers taking over property of a Palestinian family in the West Bank.
