= Cefn Gwlad =

Welsh television series

- Starring: Dai Jones
- Country of origin: Wales
- Original language: Welsh

Production
- Production company: ITV Cymru Wales

Original release
- Network: S4C
- Release: 1982 – present

Cefn Gwlad is a Welsh television series about the countryside and particularly (but not exclusively) farming in Wales. It is broadcast in Welsh. Hosted by Dai Jones ("Llanilar") until 2020, it looks at rural life in Wales, and sometimes elsewhere in the UK, through the lives of individuals or families. Occasionally the programme meets Welsh expatriates in other countries, such as New Zealand in 2009.

The show was first broadcast on HTV Wales and was taken up by S4C in 1982, where it has been aired for 35 years (in 2019). It is currently made by ITV Cymru Wales.

The former home of Katheryn of Berain, now a farmhouse, was featured in an edition of the programme in 2016.
