= Dai Jones =

British television presenter (1943–2022)

Dai Jones MBE
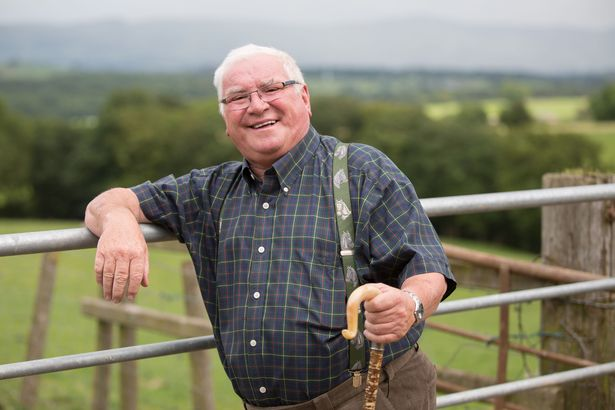
- Jones in 2017
- Born: David John Jones; 18 October 1943; Holloway, Middlesex, England
- Died: 4 March 2022 (aged 78)
- Occupations: Television presenter; radio; broadcaster
- Years active: 1966–2020
- Spouse: Olwen Jones (m. 1966)
- Children: One

David John Jones MBE (18 October 1943 – 4 March 2022), known as Dai Jones Llanilar, was a Welsh language television presenter, singer and radio broadcaster.

== Early life ==
David John Jones was born in Holloway, London, Middlesex, to a family of Welsh farmers. He moved to Cardiganshire at the age of three and was brought up by his uncle and aunt on their dairy farm in Brynchwith, Llangwyryfon. He went to school at Llangwyryfon and Ysgol Dinas, Aberystwyth and started working on the farm at 15 years old. Jones said that he deliberately failed his 11-plus exam to avoid going to grammar school because he had heard that there was a lot of homework.

At a young age, Jones was an active member of the chapel, and also the Eisteddfod and Young Farmers clubs which gave him an upbringing in Welsh culture and traditions. In 2004, Jones became the President of the Welsh Black Cattle Society in its centenary year 2004–2005.

== Career ==
Jones, known as Dai Jones Llanilar, was best known for presenting tv shows on S4C, such as Cefn Gwlad, made by ITV Cymru Wales, which documents the lives of farming families. He hosted this show since it began in 1982. He was also the main presenter of The Royal Welsh Show when it is held annually at the end of July. He was already well known on TV as the presenter of the family quiz show Siôn a Siân which he presented from 1971 to 1987. He also hosted a weekly musical requests programme on BBC Radio Cymru.

Jones was an accomplished tenor and won the blue riband prize at the National Eisteddfod of Wales in 1970. He also released recordings with the recording label Cambrian.

As a well-known figure on radio and TV, Jones was regularly lampooned in the Welsh satirical cartoon series Cnex.

He published his autobiography in 1997, entitled Fi Dai Sy' 'Ma. It was translated into English by Lyn Ebeneser and published as Dai and let live in 2004.

In December 2020, Jones announced his retirement from television and radio, after a career of over 50 years.

== Personal life ==
Jones was married to Olwen and had a son, John. He died on 4 March 2022, at the age of 78, and his funeral was attended by some 600 people.

== Awards ==
Jones won a BAFTA Cymru in 2004 for his contributions to Welsh television broadcasting.

Later that year, Jones also won the Sir Bryner Jones Award for his contribution to rural affairs.

In the 2000 New Year Honours, he was awarded the MBE "for services to Entertainment in Wales".

== Filmography ==
Year	Title	Role	Notes
1971–1987, 2014	Sion a Siân	Co-presenter	
1983–2020	Cefn Gwlad	Presenter	
?–2019	Y Sioe	Presenter	Annually
1993–2016	Rasus	Presenter	
1994	Pobol y Chyff	Dai Jones Llanilar	Episode: Cefin Gwlard
