= We Are England (2022 TV programme) =

BBC regional documentary

- Genre: News, current affairs
- Country of origin: England
- Original language: English

Production
- Running time: 30 minutes

Original release
- Network: BBC One; BBC One HD; BBC News Channel; BBC Three
- Release: 26 January – 4 April 2022

Related
- Inside Out; BBC Scotland Investigates (1993)

We Are England is a regional current affairs documentary programme shown on BBC One. The programme is made by six teams around England, based in Birmingham, London, Bristol, Leeds, Newcastle and Norwich. The programme airs six original half-hour documentaries each week, with each week themed around a different topic; the first theme was Mental Health. The programme replaced regional current affairs show Inside Out. A notable change was that each We Are England episode is a single 30-minutes documentary, whereas Inside Out normally aired a collection of short-form pieces in its 30-minute slot. Another change is a cutback in the number of teams, from 11 regional hubs to six.

== Broadcast ==
Aisling O'Connor, the head of TV commissioning for BBC England, commissioned 120 episodes to be broadcast in 2022, with the first being shown on 26 January 2022 at 7:30 pm. In-addition to being shown on BBC One and BBC iPlayer select episodes are also repeated on BBC News.

The first four episodes of We Are England aired on Wednesdays at 7:30 pm. After the fourth Farming England, the series moved to a timeslot of 8:30 pm. This move was due to the BBC's decision to schedule a new 'soap hour' over its two main channels with a regular timeslot for EastEnders on BBC One at 7.30 pm.

In May 2022, the BBC announced a raft of closures, restructures and cost-cutting measures. One of these was the decision not to renew We Are England for a third series.

In July 2022, a number of documentaries from the We Are England strand (including ones featuring Bimini, Jayde Adams and Jassa Ahluwalia) were repeated on BBC Three, alongside a number of similarly formatted 30-minute documentaries. However, rather than being grouped under the We Are England or Our Lives brands, these new documentaries were now just being listed under one off titles such as Filthy Business and Queen of Trucks on the BBC iPlayer and in programme guides.

== Episode list ==
We Are England launched on 26 January 2022, airing 60 original 30-minute documentaries over ten weeks. In February 2022, an episode about a cryptocurrency trader from the Bossing It theme (about young entrepreneurs) was pulled from broadcast at late notice, citing "editorial concerns". Another episode was later taken down from BBC iPlayer, Unfiltered, a BBC Cambridgeshire and East documentary originally broadcast in that region on 26 January 2022, which featured 19-year old dancer Mia and had an appearance from TV personality Vicky Pattison.

No.	Title	Subjects	Airdate
1	Mental Health	Poignant stories exploring mental health issues around the country	26 January 2022
		''Veterans Road to Recovery'' (Manchester)	
		"Unfiltered" (Cambridge)	
		Nature on My Mind (Somerset)	
		Fighting My Phobia (Coventry)	
		Cold Swim (Tynemouth)	
		Becoming Dad (Watford)	
2	The Night Shift	Who is keeping our country and industry moving while we sleep?	2 February 2022
		Life Blood (London)	
		Down at the Docks (Bristol)	
		Night Nurses (Birmingham)	
		Our Bin Lorry Life (Peterborough)	
		One Night in Newcastle	
		One Night at the Fish Market (Grimsby)	
3	Bossing It	Young entrepreneurs striving to set up successful businesses in the face of adversity.	9 February 2022
		Fighting for Fashion (Exeter)	
		Steffi and the Chocolate Factory	
		Photo Me Famous	
		The Container King	
		The Beauty Boss	
4	Farming England	How England's farms are taking on new challenges and keeping their businesses afloat.	16 February 2022
		When the Boats Come in (Falmouth)	
		The Crisp Farmers (Hereford)	
		My Norfolk Farm	
		First Time Farmers	
		Farming on the Spectrum (Oxfordshire)	
		Crisis on the Farm	
5	Belonging	Exploring the many ways community spirit and support changes our lives.	23 February 2022
		The Real Vicars of Dibley	
		Our Skate Park Life (Hastings)	
		Our Fight Club (Middlesbrough)	
		Our Derby Dance School	
		The Real Phoenix Nights (Clacton)	
		Cornwall's Last Raceway	
6	A Place Called Home	Six personal stories highlight the complex issues we face in finding a place to call home.	7 March 2022
		Hanging on to Home (London)	
		Van Life (Bristol)	
		Staying Afloat (Cambridgeshire)	
		Homes for the Homeless (Nottingham)	
		Students in Suburbia (Newcastle)	
		Fighting for Our Homes (Leeds)	
7	Sporting Heroes	We meet sporting heroes across England who are challenging the status quo.	14 March 2022
		Swim School	
		Mick Walks for England	
		Make Me a Jockey	
		Fighting for Me	
		Football Fat Fighters	
		Bouncing Back	
8	Made in England	Stories that champion England’s manufacturing and craftmanship.	21 March 2022
		The 007 Shoe Factory	
		Make Mine a 99	
		Inside the Jet Engine Factory	
		A Very British Bike Factory	
		Our Northern Jacket Empire	
		The Biggest Smallest Car Company	
9	True Crime	Discovering new evidence in unsolved murder cases in England.	28 March 2022
		Finding Michelle Bettles	
		Who Killed Barry Rubery?	
		Knife Angels	
		Who Killed Dad?	
		Our Adam	
		Why Did My Brother End Up Dead?	
10	My Hometown	Six celebrities take us on a personal journey of discovery in their hometowns.	4 April 2022
		Graft: Uncovering My Roots	
		Bimini Bon Boulash: Homecoming Queen	
		Jassa Ahluwalia: Am I English?	
		Livvy Haydock: My Hometown	
		Kema Kay: My Hometown	
