= 2022 in British radio =

This is a list of events taking place in 2022 relating to radio in the United Kingdom.

== Events ==
=== January ===
- 1 January – Moira Stuart, Kate Garraway and Margherita Taylor are among those from the world of broadcasting to be recognised in the 2022 New Year Honours.
- 3 January – Jazz FM presenter Anne Frankenstein announces she will change her on air name to her actual name, which is Deb Grant.
- 4 January –
  - Launch of GB News Radio on the Digital One platform; the station is a simulcast of the GB News TV channel.
  - Former BBC Asian Network presenter Yasser Ranjha joins Capital Xtra as the station's new drivetime host.
  - Absolute Radio launches its "Absolute Radio You" competition which will see it name a radio station after one of its listeners.
- 5 January –
  - The UK government gives the regulator Ofcom power to renew licences for the two national DAB multiplexes, Digital One and Sound Digital, until December 2035.
  - Hits Radio announces a new weekday schedule that will see Tom Green present the mid morning show, replacing Mike Toolan, while Hattie Pearson will replace Greg Burns on afternoons. Mike Toolan will co-present drivetime alongside Gemma Atkinson, replacing Wes Butterfield.
  - The family of Captain Sir Tom Moore thank Milton Keynes station MKFM for being the first media organisation to get behind his 2020 fundraising campaign for the NHS.
- 6 January – KISS announces plans for an overhaul of its weekend schedule that will include Sam Darlaston and Omah Howard be moving to weekend mornings, and Tatum McGreal presenting an afternoon show.
- 7 January – LBC announce that presenter Maajid Nawaz has left the station with immediate effect. No reason is given for his departure.
- 9 January – Bob Harris joins Boom Radio to present a Sunday evening programme.
- 10 January –
  - Numi Gildent takes over as presenter of the KMFM evening show The Hit List.
  - Radio Exe celebrates its tenth birthday with a message of congratulations from Prime Minister Boris Johnson.
- 11 January –
  - Singer Elvis Costello asks radio stations to stop playing his 1979 song "Oliver's Army". Costello had announced he would stop performing the song live due to a racial slur in the lyrics.
  - Times Radio appoints Daily Telegraph Deputy Political Editor Lucy Fisher as its Chief Political Commentator.
- 12 January –
  - BBC Radio 4 presenter Joe Lynam announces he will leave the station to join Irish radio station Newstalk as its business editor.
  - Gaydio breakfast presenter Paris Munro reveals to his co-host Dave Cooper and listeners that he is transmasculine non-binary.
- 13 January – Clare McDonnell is announced as the new co-presenter of BBC Radio 5 Live's Drivetime programme, replacing Anna Foster. She will take up the role from 14 February.
- 14 January – Bauer has signed a deal to syndicate American country presenter Elaina D Smith's evening show, Nights with Elaina, on Absolute Radio Country.
- 16 January – UK Youth Mental Health Ambassador Alex George joins Classic FM to present Inner Harmony. The series will focus on the effect listening to classical music can have on mental health and wellbeing.
- 17 January –
  - BBC Radio 3 and BBC Radio 4 have commissioned a series of programmes to mark the 100th anniversary of the publication of James Joyce's novel Ulysses, which was published in February 1922.
  - Terry Christian returns to BBC Radio Derby to present a week of editions of Barbed Wireless, the youth programme he launched in 1982 to mark the show's 40th anniversary.
  - Talksport announces that it has won exclusive broadcasting rights to the England tour of the West Indies, which begins later in January.
- 18 January –
  - At 5.59am GB News Radio begins a daily broadcast of the national anthem before the start of its live programming.
  - Northampton's Shire Sound Radio launches a training academy for teenagers aged 13–18 interested in following a career in broadcasting.
- 19 January – Launch of the "Doctor Next Door" podcast presented by Absolute Radio's Dave Berry.
- 23 January –
  - BBC Radio 2 airs a special programme paying tribute to presenter Janice Long, who died on Christmas Day 2021. The programme is presented by Zoe Ball and simulcast with BBC Radio Wales and BBC Radio Merseyside.
  - Radio Today reports on the forthcoming launch of Pompey Sound, a station for Portsmouth F.C., and a joint project put together by Tommy Boyd and Duncan Barkes.
  - Schedule changes are announced for Virgin Radio Anthems UK, Virgin Radio Chilled UK and Virgin Radio Groove UK.
- 24 January –
  - BBC Radio 3 begins a week of live and pre-recorded concerts celebrating the music of Manchester.
  - BBC Asian Network announces that twelve new presenters will join the network as part of its search for up and coming talent.
  - Sam Lavery joins Capital North East to prevent the weekday drivetime show.
  - Tom Green begins presenting the mid-morning show on Hits Radio.
  - Following talks between the BBC and Department of Culture, Media and Sport it is announced that the Audio Content Fund will not continue beyond its pilot phase, ending in March.
- 25 January – Ofcom announces the fourth round of small-scale radio multiplex licensing.
- 28 January –
  - Phil Jones, Editor of the Jeremy Vine Show, retires after 30 years with BBC Radio 2. He has edited the show since it began in 2003, and edited the Jimmy Young Programme before that.
  - Greatest Hits Radio announces it has become the official partner of the 2022 Rewind Festival, scheduled for July and August.
- 29 January – Capital Breakfast launches a television advertising campaign featuring Roman Kemp, Sonny Jay and Siân Welby as a panel of judges auditioning famous music artists including Ed Sheeran and Olly Murs.
- 30 January – BBC Radio 2 airs highlights of The Big Night of Musicals by The National Lottery, recorded at Manchester's AO Arena. Shown in full on BBC One, the show is presented by comedian Jason Manford and is a thank you from the National Lottery to players who have supported it during the COVID-19 pandemic.
- 31 January –
  - BBC Radio 2 launches its "Piano Room Month" live music initiative as part of Ken Bruce's show, with performances by artists each weekday until 25 February. The list of artists appearing on the feature is as follows: David Gray (31 January), Jack Savoretti (1 February), Stereophonics (2 February), Anne-Marie (3 February), Katie Melua (4 February), Clean Bandit (7 February), Joy Crookes (8 February), Will Young (9 February), Rebecca Ferguson (10 February), Tom Odell (11 February), James Morrison (14 February), Ella Henderson (15 February), Craig David (16 February), Natalie Imbruglia (17 February), James Blunt (18 February), Tears For Fears (21 February), Simple Minds (22 February), Emeli Sandé (23 February), Jamie Cullum (24 February), and Ed Sheeran (25 February).
  - BBC Radio 6 Music celebrates Independent Venue Week with a series of special programmes presented by Steve Lamacq.
  - Bauer Media Audio UK announces plans to migrate its digital listeners from radio aggregators to its own platforms.
  - BBC Radio 5 Live begins producing daily editions of its Rugby Union Weekly podcast for the duration of the 2022 Six Nations Championship.

=== February ===
- 1 February – The BBC confirms that some radio content from BBC Radio 4 and BBC Radio 5 Live will be made exclusive to the BBC Sounds app for 28 days before becoming more widely available.
- 2 February –
  - In a special broadcast BBC Radio 3 showcases the work of forgotten classical music artists Margaret Bonds, Ali Osman and Joseph Bologne, Chevalier de Saint-Georges.
  - It is announced that Paul O'Grady will take a break from his BBC Radio 2 Sunday teatime show Paul O'Grady on the Wireless for 12 weeks. Rob Beckett will host the slot during this period. The show will return on 22 May 2022.
- 3 February – RAJAR releases its figures for the fourth quarter of 2021, indicating that one billion hours of radio were listened to during that time by roughly 49.5 million adults who listened for an average of 20.3 hours per week.
- 4 February –
  - BBC Radio Wales and BBC Radio Cymru broadcast a series of special programmes to celebrate Welsh Language Music Day.
  - V2 Radio in West Sussex has started playing the national anthem each day at midnight, it is reported.
  - Absolute Radio launches Absolute Radio Natalie, a temporary station named after one of its listeners, Natalie Cole, who suggested a station of singalong anthems.
- 6 February – Scala Radio launches The Classic Comedy Club, a four-part series in which comedians Isy Suttie, Sindhu Vee, Maisie Adam and Andy Parsons each present their own show, curating a playlist of music that makes them happy.
- 7 February –
  - BBC Radio 2 launches 21st Century Folk in partnership with local BBC radio stations, an initiative to capture the essence of life in the North East of England in 2022.
  - It is confirmed that a limited number of commercials will shortly begin airing on Virgin Radio's The Chris Evans Breakfast Show, which has been ad-free since its launch in 2019. Times Radio also plans to introduce commercials for the first time since its launch.
  - Radio Today reports on Shaun Keaveny's return to radio, with the launch of Shaun Keaveny's Creative Cul-de-sac, a podcast on his Patreon page beginning on this date; Keaveny has also launched his own radio station, Community Garden Radio, through the page.
- 9 February –
  - Figures released by industry body Radiocentre reveal commercial radio took £718.7 million in advertising revenue during 2021, the highest annual revenue to date.
  - Launch of The Radio Academy Podcast, a weekly podcast presented by Roisin Hastie that will look at radio and audio projects.
- 10 February –
  - Greatest Hits Radio have signed Richard Allinson and Kate Thornton to present Saturday afternoon and Saturday evening shows respectively.
  - Former LBC presenter Maajid Nawaz has signed a deal with social media platform Gettr to produce content for them.
  - Radiocentre Client Director Lucy Barrett is appointed inaugural President of the new World Radio Alliance.
- 12 February – A new study by radio manufacturer Pure highlights the increase of people tuning into radio, which they regard as a trusted source of breaking news and instant information.
- 13 February –
  - Reality television star Sam Thompson joins Hits Radio to present Sunday morning breakfast.
  - The Community Media Association launches "Radiole", an online word game to celebrate World Radio Day 2022.
- 14 February – Fun Kids hosts a live event from London's Royal Greenwich Observatory during which a love letter from Earth is broadcast both nationwide and into space. The event earns the station the Guinness World Record title for the First Radio Programme Beamed into Deep Space.
- 15 February – Sixteen-year-old Josh Holmes-Bright, a presenter on Caroline Community Radio, joins Radio Caroline after being approached by station bosses who heard him presenting on the community station.
- 16 February – The online output of Bauer Radio's stations goes down for around half an hour just before 8am because of an internal update to their streaming service.
- 17 February – Ofcom awards grants totalling £390,689 to 26 community radio stations for projects.
- 18 February –
  - Nation Radio gains nearly half a million listeners for the fourth quarter of 2021 after RAJAR reattributes some of the listening figures for that period from national to local services.
  - Former Scottish Conservative leader Ruth Davidson joins Times Radio to present the Friday afternoon show.
  - Chris Moyse, managing director and Station Manager at Park Radio since 2010, announces his intention to step down from the roles in order to concentrate on new projects.
- 19 February – Talksport exclusively broadcasts the boxing match between Amir Khan and Kell Brook, held in Manchester.
- 20 February –
  - David Jensen's Jazz returns to Jazz FM for a second series.
  - Moray Firth Radio celebrates its 40th anniversary on air with a three-hour programme featuring some past presenters, including Gary Spence, who returns to the station to present the show.
- 21 February – Ofcom finds Leicester-based community radio station Takeover Radio in breach of its key commitments for failing to provide enough original content.
- 22 February –
  - Ellara Wakely, who leads the BBC Ten Pieces scheme, is appointed as a Commissioning Executive at BBC Radio 3.
  - Global Radio have hired Jon Sopel and Emily Maitlis to present a programme together on LBC, as well as a daily podcast exclusively for Global Player.
- 24 February – Union JACK Radio, Union JACK Dance and Union JACK Rock disappear from the national SDL DAB multiplex at midnight. No explanation is given for their disappearance and Ofcom says it has not revoked their licences. The stations continue to be available online.
- 25–27 February – BBC Radio 5 Live drops some non-news and sport shows, such as Kermode and Mayo's Film Review, to provide extended coverage of the Russian invasion of Ukraine. The shows are instead released as podcasts on BBC Sounds.
- 27 February – Lyca Radio and Lyca Gold broadcast a special ten hour programme featuring the 100 Greatest Bollywood Love Songs as voted for by their listeners.
- 28 February –
  - Radio 1 presenter Jordan North begins a challenge to row 100 miles of canals between London and Burnley to raise money for Comic Relief.
  - AIR 107.2, the community station for Weymouth and Portland, increases its output to 100 watts with the switch on of a new transmitter that was funded by Weymouth Town Council; its previous output had been 25 watts.

=== March ===
- 1 March – BBC Radio 2 begins a month of programming dedicated to country music to tie in with the C2C: Country to Country festival.
- 3 March – JACK Media National Ltd., the parent company of Union JACK Radio, enters administration and makes several staff members redundant. Its three stations, Union JACK Radio, Union JACK Rock and Union JACK Dance, had disappeared from the national SDL DAB multiplex on 24 February.
- 4 March –
  - Commercial and community stations begin airing the Disasters Emergency Committee's latest appeal to support humanitarian efforts in the Russian invasion of Ukraine.
  - Deborah Meaden joins BBC Radio 5 Live to present The Big Green Money Show, a ten-part programme looking at business and climate change which is also available through BBC Sounds.
  - Exeter-based Radio Exe joins DAB in Plymouth allowing it to expand its coverage to encompass the whole of West Devon.
  - KISS reorganises its Friday and Saturday night schedule.
- 6 March –
  - Comedian Jennifer Saunders joins Classic FM to present From Couch to Opera House (in 7 weeks), in partnership with the English National Opera.
  - Bauer Media launches Menopause Month on Magic Radio with a series of programmes to raise awareness of the issue.
- 7 March –
  - Andrew Marr joins LBC to present Tonight with Andrew Marr from Mondays to Thursdays; the hour-long show is also available as a telecast through Global Player.
  - Country music radio station Chris Country rebrands as CountryLine Radio.
- 8 March –
  - Scala Radio broadcasts Inspirational Women in Music to mark International Women's Day.
  - BBC Radio 1 announces forthcoming schedule changes that come into effect from September, with the departure of René LaVice and DJ Target while Mollie King will present a weekly show titled Radio 1's Future Pop.
  - A police officer is dismissed from West Mercia Police for using his work mobile to text radio competitions using premium SMS numbers.
- 9 March –
  - Fix Radio, a station aimed at the UK's 2.2 million builders, confirms it will be joining the Sound Digital Ltd DAB multiplex, meaning it will air nationally.
  - Nation Broadcasting takes a 10% stake in Podcast Radio ahead of plans to expand internationally.
  - Former BBC Radio 1 presenter Mark Page is found guilty of trying to arrange the sexual abuse of children in the Philippines following a trial at Teesside Crown Court, and sentenced to 12 years imprisonment. The sentence is subsequently referred to the Court of Appeal by the Solicitor General as being unduly lenient, and on 10 June it is increased to 18 years.
- 11 March –
  - BBC Radio 6 Music celebrates 20 years on air.
  - Sheffield-based Muslim station Link FM is fined £2,000 by Ofcom for broadcasting a piece of music that incited listeners to join a violent jihad.
  - London community station Rinse FM is sanctioned by Ofcom for playing a track, "Better In Tune with the Infinite" by Jay Electronica without providing sufficient contextualisation; the track has been described as containing antisemitic lyrics.
- 13 March – Nicole Appleton joins Magic Radio to present the first of three programmes celebrating women in music.
- 14 March – Nottingham Trent University's student radio station, Fly Live, celebrates 25 years on air with a marathon 25-hour show.
- 15 March – Sky News Radio renews its deal with Independent Radio News to provide news bulletins for commercial radio stations. The length of the new agreement has not been disclosed but is reported to be "multi-year".
- 16 March – Global Radio is named as the official partner of Concert for Ukraine, a fundraising event being organised by ITV, Livewire Pictures and the Disasters Emergency Committee for 29 March.
- 21 March – Former Inside Business presenter Richard Morgan joins Tara Mills and Declan Harvey on Evening Extra on BBC Radio Ulster.
- 23 March – The BBC World Service receives £4.1 million in emergency funding from the UK Government to support its services in Russia and Ukraine.
- 24 March –
  - Former BBC chairman Lord Michael Grade is appointed as the next chairman of Ofcom.
  - LBC presenter Eddie Mair announces he is to leave the station in August.
  - Overnight programming on BBC Radio 5 Live is temporarily suspended due to Covid-related staff shortages at the station's MediaCityUK studios. The station will instead simulcast the BBC World Service between 01:00 and 05:00 daily until at least 4 April.
  - After four and a half years on Drive, Heart North East presenter Emil Franchi makes his final appearance on the station. He subsequently announces he is leaving his post.
- 28 March –
  - Kirsty Lang takes over as presenter of BBC Radio 4's Round Britain Quiz, replacing Tom Sutcliffe.
  - Greatest Hits Radio has signed a deal with the British Motor Show to become their official sponsorship partner.
- 30 March – Virgin Radio presenter Kate Lawler presents her last show on the station, after announcing she was to leave the station to spend more time with her family.

=== April ===
- 1 April –
  - The three-day BBC Radio 6 Music Festival begins in Cardiff.
  - The final edition of Kermode and Mayo's Film Review is broadcast on BBC Radio 5 Live after 21 years on air. The show will be replaced by an extended 5 Live Drive. It is subsequently announced the show will continue as a twice-weekly podcast titled Kermode and Mayo's Take after Mark Kermode and Simon Mayo sign a deal with Sony Music Entertainment, with their first edition going out on 5 May.
  - Uckfield FM rebrands as Ashdown Radio and extends its coverage area. A new relay on 94.7 FM will cover Crowborough.
  - Portsmouth-based online station Victory Radio launches on DAB, with Gary Champion presenting the first show at 7am.
  - Digital radio station 45 Radio is added to the DAB multiplexes in Edinburgh and Newcastle.
- 3 April –
  - Zoe Ball presents Wogan: In His Own Words, a Radio 2 documentary marking the 50th anniversary of Sir Terry Wogan's first breakfast show on the network. It includes excerpts of an in-depth television interview he recorded with a BBC South reporter in 1980 during which he spoke candidly about his life and career. Prior to its transmission on Radio 2 the documentary is also made available on BBC Sounds from 1 April.
  - Talksport broadcasts the Manchester Remembers charity football match, held to mark the fifth anniversary of the Manchester Arena bombing.
- 4 April – Broadcaster Huw Stephens and Cardiff singer-songwriter Aleighcia Scott take over as presenters of the Evening Show on BBC Radio Wales, with Stephens presenting the programme from Mondays to Wednesdays and Scott presenting on Thursdays.
- 7 April –
  - Liverpool Football Club sign a deal with Asia Radio Concepts to roll out new Liverpool-branded radio stations throughout the Middle East and Asia-Pacific.
  - Online station River Radio launches on DAB in the Thames Valley area, with a potential audience of seven million.
- 8 April –
  - The Radio Today website reports that Ofcom have confirmed the closure of Scottish Sun Hits, Scottish Sun Chilled and Scottish Sun 80s, all of which disappeared from DAB the previous week; their website has also been taken down.
  - BBC Radio 2 celebrates the launch of its BBC Sounds service Radio 2 90s with a day of 90s music. Radio 1 Happy has also launched on Sounds. In the coming weeks the services will be joined by ten others: The Reset, Amplified, Total Rewind, Rap Unlocked, Artist Icons, Pre-Party, Pop Right Now, Charged Up, Soothing Sleep and Radio 1 Anthems.
- 11 April –
  - Former Sky News presenter Adam Boulton joins Times Radio to present the week's Drivetime programme as cover for John Pienaar.
  - Nation Radio's schedule is overhauled in a bid to refresh the station. The changes include Russ Williams presenting weekday afternoons, and Neil Fox presenting his Jukebox show on weekday evenings.
  - The Radio Today website reports on the launch of Eirewave, a rock and pop station based in Belfast. The station will become available on DAB in Glasgow from May, and plans to join other DAB multiplexes.
  - Details of the first major weeknight programme to appear on TalkTV and talkRADIO are revealed. The News Desk will be an hour-long news and current affairs programme presented by Tom Newton Dunn.
  - The inaugural recipients of the BBC's Radio Indie Development Fund are announced.
- 14 April –
  - talkSPORT launches Following On – County Cricketer in partnership with The Cricketer magazine. The show will focus on English county cricket and be broadcast on talkSPORT 2 and The Cricketer website.
  - The BBC has launched Doctor Who: Redacted on BBC Sounds, the first Doctor Who series to be written by and feature a transgender character.
  - Global Radio reveals the winners of the 2022 Global Awards, with Ed Sheeran winning in three of the 14 categories.
- 19 April –
  - Former Magic Radio presenter Richard Allinson joins Scala Radio to present the evening show from Mondays to Thursdays.
  - The Hospital Broadcasting Association launches the HSA Podcast Network, its own podcast platform to help its member stations share their own podcasts easier.
  - Time 107.5 presenter Steve N Allen presents his afternoon show from the M25 after it is closed due to an incident in which a lorry sheds its load on the clockwise carriageway.
- 20 April – Talkradio announces a new schedule ahead of the launch of TalkTV, which includes the addition of Daisy McAndrew to its presenting team.
- 21 April –
  - Nation Broadcasting launches Breezy Radio, a station replacing Swansea Bay Radio on 102.1FM in Swansea, and available throughout Wales on DAB.
  - Bauer announces that CFM, Gem, MFR, Radio Borders and The Wave Swansea will carry network programming from Hits Radio. All stations will retain local breakfast programming.
- 23–24 April – David Tennant portrays Macbeth in a Radio 4 production of the Scottish Play to coincide with William Shakespeare's birthday.
- 24 April – Alan Robson MBE presents his final edition of his talk show, Alan Robson's Night Owls, on Greatest Hits Radio in the North East after being on air for 50 years.
- 25 April –
  - Launch of talkTV with a limited television output and a daytime schedule mostly simulcast from talkRADIO. The launch night includes the first edition of Piers Morgan Uncensored featuring an appearance by former US President Donald Trump.
  - Nicola Lashley joins Viking FM to present breakfast alongside Alex Duffy.
  - BBC Radio 1 and Capital both confirm Harry Styles will be part of the line up at their respective forthcoming music events. He will be part of Radio 1's Big Weekend in Coventry on 29 May and Capital's Summertime Ball at Wembley Stadium on 12 June.
- 26 April –
  - Virgin Radio announces schedule changes ready for the summer, and the return of Virgin Radio Pride.
  - KISS announces a partnership with the Rio Ferdinand Foundation to raise awareness and drive change in the way young people are supported in building their futures.
  - BBC Three airs the documentary Tim Westwood: Abuse of Power in which several women allege that Capital Xtra and former Radio 1 DJ Tim Westwood committed sexual misconduct and abused his position in the music industry.
- 27 April – Tim Westwood steps down from his Capital Xtra programme "until further notice" following allegations of sexual misconduct.
- 28 April – The Virgin Radio UK Big Thank You Tour comes to an end with a gig at Wembley featuring the Kaiser Chiefs, The Fratellis, The Feeling, David Gray, Ash, Newton Faulkner, The Vaccines, Isaac Stuart, The Wild Things, Tom Grennan and Tom Walker. The tour, a free concert for key workers, has also seen events take place in Glasgow and Manchester.
- 29 April –
  - Times Radio presenter Phil Williams announces he will leave the station when his contract expires on 1 June.
  - Talkradio presenter Jeremy Kyle confirms he will leave his drivetime show to present a primetime programme on TalkTV.

=== May ===
- 2 May –
  - Heather Small joins Greatest Hits Radio for Greatest Hits Heroes, a three-hour programme featuring some of her favourite uplifting music.
  - Listeners of Smooth Radio vote George Michael's "Careless Whisper" their favourite song of all time in the Smooth All Time Top 500.
- 3 May –
  - The 2022 Audio and Radio Industry Awards are held at London's Adelphi Theatre, where the late Janice Long is honoured with the inaugural Pioneer Award for her work in radio. Hits Radio is named UK Station or Network of the Year. The night also attracts controversy after an anonymous group of producers and podcasters criticises the nomination of the documentary Nolan Investigates, claiming it "perpetuates a narrative" that creating a safe world for trans people is a "divisive issue".
  - Fix Radio begins broadcasting nationwide after launching on the SDL Multiplex.
- 4 May –
  - TuneIn is reported to have started removing some UK radio stations from its platform over a court ruling about music licensing.
  - Lyca Radio and Lyca Gold are named exclusive radio partners of the Eid In Trafalgar Square event to be held on Saturday 7 May.
- 6 May –
  - Neev Spencer joins Magic Radio to present the Friday evening show from 7–10pm, and Saturday Soul from 4–7pm.
  - The BBC announces that YouTuber and comedian Hashu Mohammed, also known as Smashbengali, will replace Harpz Kaur as host of the BBC Asian Network's Weekend Breakfast show from 11 June.
  - Boom Radio presenter David Hamilton reveals on air that he has been diagnosed with polycythaemia vera, a rare form of blood cancer that he describes as "not curable but treatable", and says he will continue to present his six-days-a-week show.
- 10 May –
  - Ofcom finds Leicester-based station Radio2Funky in breach of its Key Commitments for delivering 63 hours of original content in a week, rather than the required 70, following a listener complaint.
  - The NSPCC partners with OMD and Bauer Media to promote Childhood Day across Absolute Radio and Magic Radio on 10 June.
- 12 May –
  - The BBC announces that Emil Franchi, Ben Coley, Emma-Louise and Emma Millen will each host the Friday edition of BBC Radio 1's Early Breakfast show on a monthly rotation, beginning from July.
  - Deborah James, a co-presenter of the BBC podcast You, Me and the Big C, is honoured with a damehood days after revealing she is receiving end-of-life care for bowel cancer. The honour is conferred on her by Prince William at her home the following day.
- 13 May –
  - At 10:59am, over 500 UK radio stations join to broadcast the Mental Health Minute, which features contributions from the Duke and Duchess of Cambridge. It is estimated that approximately 20 million people listened to the Duke and Duchess' message.
  - BBC Radio 5 Live and talkSPORT extend their rights to broadcast commentaries of live Premier League matches until the end of the 2024–25 season.
  - Debut of Fun Kids Radio's Truthdiggers, a twelve-part "true crime show". The show will be broadcast on Fridays and as a podcast.
  - Former Hits Radio presenter Greg Burns joins Nation Radio UK to host the station's weekday drivetime programme and weekend breakfast programme.
- 16 May – Former Rock FM presenter Rob Charles announces plans to launch a radio station for the Preston area using the Red Rose Radio name; Rock FM launched in 1982 as Red Rose Radio.
- 17 May – BBC Radio 1 launches the Presenter Uploader tool to enable potential new presenters to upload their demo tapes to its server. The software is also made available to the entire radio industry.
- 18 May –
  - Data released for early 2022 shows the BBC Sounds app with an average of 4.06 million listeners per week.
  - Happy Radio begins airing on DAB in Manchester.
- 19 May –
  - The latest figures published by Radio Joint Audience Research Limited (RAJAR) covering the first three months of 2022 show a decline in listeners to breakfast shows, partially prompted by lifestyle changes brought about by the COVID-19 pandemic, and an increase in listeners to speech radio stations such as Times Radio and Talkradio. The show to attract the greatest number of listeners during the first three months of 2022 is Ken Bruce's mid-morning show on Radio 2, which was heard over that period by a weekly average of 8.4 million listeners. The figures also show that Boom Radio increased its listenership by 20%, attaining an average of 290,000 weekly listeners.
  - Debut of Radio 4's new series DMs Are Open featuring audio sketches submitted by listeners. The show is in the same vein as Newsjack.
- 20 May – Heart 00s launches at 06:00 on the national DAB D1 multiplex. As a result, Capital Xtra Reloaded is removed from the multiplex. The station remains available on DAB in London, and on Global Player.
- 22 May – Writer, podcast presenter and mental health ambassador Gemma Styles joins Classic FM to present the first of two shows for the network.
- 23 May –
  - talkSPORT announces a partnership with Cricket Ireland to broadcast live coverage of the Ireland cricket team's games against India, New Zealand and South Africa.
  - Arqiva carries out an inspection of 48 transmitting masts following the Bilsdale transmitter fire in August 2021.
- 24 May –
  - Listeners to The Radio 2 Breakfast Show vote "Sweet Caroline" by Neil Diamond the song that everyone should be encouraged to sing at street parties to celebrate the Platinum Jubilee of Elizabeth II.
  - Greatest Hits Radio teams up with elderly private homecare provider Home Instead for an awards campaign around the Platinum Jubilee of Elizabeth II.
  - Steve Hyland joins Lite RADIO to present their breakfast show.
- 25 May –
  - Three community stations, Eruption FM, Link FM and Mighty Radio, are found to be in breach of their licences by Ofcom for broadcasting offensive language. Eruption FM had featured a DJ comment which included swearing and racial slurs, as well as playing the songs "Shook Ones (Part II)" by Mobb Deep and "Shutterbugg" by Big Boi which had included the same slurs in their lyrics. Link FM had played "Still on Deen" by Khaleed Saddiq which also included racial slurs, while Mighty Radio had played an uncensored version of "What Time is Love?" by The KLF which contained two uses of the word "motherfucker".
  - To commemorate the fifth anniversary of the Manchester Arena bombing, BBC Radio Manchester launches the "Three Ways to Save a Life" campaign to provide first aid training, in partnership with St John Ambulance.
  - The BBC Sounds app is added to the PlayStation 5.
- 26 May – BBC Director-General Tim Davie announces plans for an annual £500m of savings that will see the closure of BBC Radio 5 Live's medium wave service, BBC Radio 4's long wave service and BBC Radio 4 Extra. There are also changes to local radio, with plans for shared content and the cancellation of some programmes that are not drawing a large enough audience.
- 27 May –
  - Care Radio, available on DAB in London and parts of the Southeast, is added to DAB in Manchester.
  - Bauer Media announce plans to launch a subscription service for Absolute Radio and KISS, allowing listeners to access commercial free content for a monthly fee.
  - The Radio Today website reports that a Hits Radio listener from the West Midlands has won £115,000 on the network's Cash Register competition.
  - The RadioToday website reports that Bauer Radio is refurbishing the studios of Wave 105 near Southampton in preparation for it to become the company's South Broadcast Centre.
  - The BBC announces it has dropped journalist and author Matthew Stadlen as a stand-in presenter on BBC Radio 5 Live days after his appointment was announced. The decision comes in the wake of a backlash on social media over the question of Stadlen's impartiality because of his overt support for the Labour Party.
- 30 May – To celebrate the Platinum Jubilee of Elizabeth II, London community station Riverside Radio embarks on its "70 over 70" project to interview 70 people aged 70 about their lives during the Queen's reign. The interviews will be heard throughout June.
- 31 May –
  - Talksport wins the exclusive broadcast rights to England's three match ODI cricket tour of the Netherlands in June.
  - Bauer Media confirms the completion of its acquisition of Media Capital Rádios in Portugal.

=== June ===
- 1 June –
  - Among those from the world of broadcasting to be honoured in the 2022 Birthday Honours is Clare Balding, who becomes an OBE. Former Secretary of State for Culture Maria Miller receives a Damehood.
  - The LGBTQ+ targeted Virgin Radio Pride UK returns for a second summer of broadcasting, with Virgin Radio Groove UK temporarily closing until at least September to allow its DAB place to be used by Virgin Radio Pride UK.
  - Burgess Hill Radio is rebranded as Mid Sussex Radio.
  - Bauer Media's Cash for Kids Day has raised £845,607, its Cash for Kids charity confirms.
- 2 June –
  - Ken Bruce presents another All Day PopMaster as part of Radio 2's Jubilee celebrations.
  - Nile Rodgers appears on Magic Breakfast to help launch Magic Radio's Magic Loves Summer promotion. The promotion will feature special programmes presented by Rodgers and George Ezra, as well as a playlist change to back-to-back summer hits whenever the UK temperature rises.
- 3 June –
  - The Friday evening episode of The Archers resumes regular broadcasts on BBC Radio 4.
  - Boom Radio announces plans to launch a spin-off station in July. Boom Light will play music from the 1950s, standards and easy listening, and will initially be available online and via smart devices, as well as on DAB in Salisbury, with plans to expand its DAB output.
- 6 June –
  - Kiss Fresh presenter Kaylee Golding joins Hits Radio Pride to present a weekday afternoon show.
  - Portsmouth F.C. fan station Pompey Sound is to be trialled on small scale DAB in the city, it is reported.
- 7 June – Radio Today reports that Bristol-based BCfm is among 50 UK radio stations chosen to contribute to the British Library’s National Radio Archive scheme.
- 8 June – Nick Grimshaw teams up with restaurateur Angela Hartnett to present Dish, a new weekly podcast looking at food.
- 10 June – Scott Mills confirms that the game Innuendo Bingo is to return to his radio show following an 18-month break due to health and safety issues during the COVID-19 pandemic.
- 11 June – Tazer Black joins BBC 1Xtra to co-present Saturday afternoons alongside Sian Anderson.
- 12 June – The Capital Summertime Ball is livestreamed on TikTok following Global's deal with the social media outlet to show footage of the event.
- 13 June –
  - Talksport launches The Men's Room, a weekly podcast discussing men's issues such as masculinity, addiction, mental health and fatherhood.
  - talkSPORT confirms it will broadcast all of England's UEFA Women's Euro 2022 matches, as well as those played by Northern Ireland.
  - Ofcom upholds complaints against Absolute Radio and Greatest Hits Radio for use of the F-word during programmes. At Absolute Radio a pre-recorded edition of The Jason Manford Show included comedian Steve Edge's use of the word, while Greatest Hits Radio broadcast a live version of Genesis's "Invisible Touch" on Boxing Day 2021 that included the word.
  - Global Radio has taken a share in Odeeo, a tech start-up that delivers audio ads in mobile games.
- 15 June – London voice assistant adtech firm Say It Now partners with Specsavers to allow customers listening to radio on smart devices to book their hearing tests online.
- 16 June – After 13 years at the BBC, Radio 1 Broadcast Journalist Sinead Garvan announces she will set herself up as a voice-over artist.
- 17 June –
  - Ofcom has revoked the small-scale DAB licence awarded to UK DAB Network for the Inverclyde region in March 2021 after it was not activated, and after current owners Nation Broadcasting said they would not resubmit a technical plan following the rejection of its original submission.
  - Radio Today reports that Tyneside-based station Frisk Radio has started to accept cryptocurrency as a payment method from its advertisers.
  - Forth 1 moves from Edinburgh's Forth Street to its new studios at St James Quarter, with the Boogie in the Morning team walking to the new premises live on air.
- 20 June –
  - Global Media confirms that Newsnight Policy Editor Lewis Goodall is joining Global to co-present a daily podcast alongside Jon Sopel and Emily Maitlis. Goodall will also become Global's Analysis and Investigations Editor.
  - Taunton-based community station Tone FM have signed a deal with the Somerset County Gazette to provide local news on-air and on its website.
- 21 June – Global Radio launches two new broadcast journalism apprenticeships linked to its Birmingham and Manchester newsrooms. The two year placements will provide a qualification equivalent to a university degree.
- 22 June –
  - BBC Radio Nottingham breakfast presenter Sarah Julian and her team are an hour late beginning their show, scheduled to start at 6am, after a technical issue with studio access leaves them locked out. The output of BBC Radio Lincolnshire is heard instead until the issue is sorted and the programme is able begin at 7am.
  - The former headquarters of Heart Berkshire has been sold to a property developer and will be transformed into a 66-bed upmarket care home, it is reported.
- 22–26 June – BBC radio and television, BBC Sounds and BBC iPlayer provide coverage of the 2022 Glastonbury Festival, with BBC Radio 6 Music providing the bulk of the event's coverage. By 28 June, Glastonbury content on BBC Sounds has been listened to 2.3 million times, while content from the festival on iPlayer has been streamed 34.1 million times (23 million of them livestreamed), setting a record for viewing of a BBC programme.
- 23 June – Andy Carter is re-elected as Chair of the All-Party Parliamentary Group on Commercial Radio for another year.
- 27 June –
  - Breezy Radio was scheduled to be added to DAB in London and the Home Counties, but owners Nation Broadcasting have an eleventh-hour rethink and decide to add Nation 80s instead.
  - BBC Radio 1 presenter Adele Roberts announces on her Instagram account that she is now "cancer-free", having been diagnosed with bowel cancer in October 2021.
  - Ofcom rules that Cando FM in Barrow-in-Furness has breached its licence by running a sponsor credit into its news bulletins in January 2022, an act that is prohibited by the Broadcasting Code.
  - Gaydio has partnered with Pride in London, Manchester Pride, Brighton Pride and Birmingham Pride to provide bespoke campaigns to increase the events' profiles.
- 29 June – It is confirmed that former England cricket captain Michael Vaughan will step back from his work at the BBC amid the "ongoing dialogue" around the Yorkshire racism investigation.
- 30 June –
  - Bauer announce it is to leave its studios in One Golden Square and relocate to new studios in Euston, with the move due to be completed by mid-2023.
  - Digital radio station RB1 Radio announces plans to launch on DAB in Rotherham.

=== July ===
- 1 July –
  - Classic FM presenter John Suchet presents his final daily show after twelve years with the station. He will continue to present occasional special shows.
  - Launch of Tomorrowland One World Radio, a partnership between the organisers of Belgium's Tomorrowland Festival and the UK's Like Media Group. The station will launch on local DAB in various parts of the UK, and is also available in Malta and Spain.
  - Steve Wright announces he will step down from his afternoon show on BBC Radio 2 in September. He will be replaced by Scott Mills, who will step down from his own afternoon show on BBC Radio 1, as well as his presenting role on BBC Radio 5 Live. Wright will continue to present Steve Wright's Sunday Love Songs for Radio 2, while his afternoon co-presenters, Janey Lee Grace and Tim Smith, will leave the station. Mills' new show will air from 2–4pm, giving Sara Cox an extra hour on her drivetime show.
  - The three-day 2022 Love Supreme Festival gets under way at Glynde Place, East Sussex.
- 4 July –
  - Iain Lee joins Jack FM Oxfordshire to present the breakfast show.
  - Former BBC Radio 4 newsreader Zeb Soanes joins Classic FM to become the new presenter of Smooth Classics at Seven.
- 5 July –
  - Dean McCullough and Vicky Hawkesworth are named as presenters of the Radio 1 afternoon show that will replace Scott Mills from September.
  - Global have signed Chris Stark, Scott Mills' Radio 1 co-presenter, as Creative Executive Producer and co-presenter of Capital Breakfast alongside Roman Kemp.
  - The Guardian announces the launch of the Women’s Football Weekly podcast to coincide with the UEFA Women's Euro 2022. It will be presented by Faye Carruthers.
  - Rhodri Talfan Davies, Director of BBC Nations, confirms major changes to the BBC Local senior leadership team in England, with the creation of six regions headed by a director.
- 7 July – UK government crisis: Today (BBC Radio 4) is extended this morning to cover the announcement of Boris Johnson's resignation as Leader of the Conservative Party, which is reported live by political editor Chris Mason taking a call from Downing Street Director of Communications Guto Harri. The World at One is also extended, running for two hours, from 12noon until 2pm.
- 11 July – Christian Steel joins Nova Radio North East to present a weekly Tuesday lunchtime show.
- 12 July – Online station Edge Radio, founded by former GMG Radio executive Jay Crawford, begins broadcasting on DAB in Edinburgh.
- 14 July –
  - Ofcom announces the fifth round of small-scale DAB licences which will see 32 licences awarded for London and the South East.
  - The BBC unveils plans to merge its UK and international news services into a single service called BBC News, with a provisional launch date of April 2023. One of the programmes will be a simulcast of Nicky Campbell's daily show on BBC Radio 5 Live.
- 15 July –
  - Radio 2 launches a new weekend schedule that sees Angela Griffin, DJ Spoony and Michelle Visage presenting regular shows. The Radio 2 Rockshow with Johnnie Walker moves to Friday nights, while Sounds of the 80s moves back to Saturday nights, Sounds of the 90s moves to Saturday nights, and Tony Blackburn's The Golden Hour moves to Sunday nights.
  - Chris Stevens, founder of and breakfast show presenter with CountryLine Radio confirms he is leaving the station at the end of July.
- 16 July – BBC Radio 1 Relax presents Radio 1 Relax at the Proms, the first collaboration between the Proms and Radio 1. The event, presented by Sian Eleri, features British hip-hop artist Kojey Radical.
- 18 July –
  - The House of Lords Communications and Digital Committee publishes a report looking into the future of BBC funding, highlighting the need for the BBC to define its future role more clearly, including setting out options for future funding.
  - UK travel company On the Beach becomes the new sponsor of Magic Radio's breakfast show.
- 18–22 July –
  - Former Radio 1 presenter Annie Macmanus makes her BBC Radio 6 Music debut as she sits in for Lauren Laverne on Breakfast.
  - LBC presenter James O'Brien takes a week's holiday, and in his absence his mid-morning show is covered by a selection of politicians – Angela Rayner on 18 July, Matt Hancock on 19 July, Tom Tugendhat on 20 July, Jeremy Hunt on 21 July and Wes Streeting on 22 July.
- 19 July – Podcast Radio launches the first of its planned brand extensions, Podcast Radio Business.
- 20 July –
  - Greg James, Scott Mills and Chris Stark launch the Radio 1 Giant Jigsaw in which breakfast show presenter James must find parts of a giant jigsaw located in different parts of the UK.
  - Laura Whitmore is confirmed to be leaving her Sunday morning show on BBC Radio 5 Live.
- 22 July –
  - Ofcom have awarded a total of £242,395 from the Community Radio Fund to 18 UK community radio stations.
  - Sean Thorne presents his final edition of Fun Kids Breakfast.
  - Bauer Media Audio have appointed Christiane Freund as People and Culture Director and Adrian Goss as General Counsel for Bauer Media Audio & Publishing UK.
- 23 July – The 2022 British Podcast Awards are unveiled at an event in London's Kennington Park, with You, Me and the Big C, which focuses on living with cancer, named Podcast Champion and crime podcast RedHanded winning the Listeners' Choice Award.
- 24 July – BBC Asian Network's Nikita Kanda and Mistah Islah present a night of BBC Asian Network Comedy at Birmingham's Glee Club.
- 25 July –
  - George Butler succeeds Sean Thorne as presenter of Fun Kids Breakfast, and is joined on his inaugural show by actor Steve Carell.
  - London One Radio joins small-scale DAB in Edinburgh to serve the city's Italian community.
  - Beat Radio in Preston, Radio Scarborough, and Secklow Sounds in Milton Keynes are all found to have been in breach of their conditions for failing to retain recordings and provide them to Ofcom on request, prompting Ofcom to remind stations of their obligations to do so.
- 26 July –
  - Talkradio presents a joint Conservative Party leadership debate with The Sun and featuring Rishi Sunak and Liz Truss. The debate, presented by talkTV political editor Kate McCann, is halted after around 30 minutes when McCann faints on stage. After several minutes of silence, Ian Collins takes over the broadcast from the Talkradio studio.
  - A survey indicates £3.35million has been distributed by the Audio Content Fund since its establishment in 2019.
  - Ofcom finds community station Rhondda Radio to be in breach of its regulations after Lorraine Jones, a presenter on the station, continued to host her country and folk show while standing as a Plaid Cymru candidate in the 2022 Rhondda Cynon Taf County Borough Council election. Section 6.6 of Ofcom's regulations prevent anyone campaigning in an election from acting as a news broadcaster, interviewer or presenter.
- 28 July –
  - Online station MMH Radio is purchased by Credible Media.
  - Small scale DAB licences are awarded for Belfast and Lisburn, North Aberdeen and Nottingham, and will go on air in the next 18 months.
- 29 July – Vanessa Feltz presents her final Early Breakfast Show for BBC Radio 2 after 12 years with the network. She will return from 15 to 26 August to cover for Jeremy Vine before leaving Radio 2 permanently. She is also leaving BBC Radio London in August.

=== August ===
- 1 August –
  - Dean Martin joins Great British Radio to present weekday drivetime and Sunday evenings.
  - Jeremy Kyle takes over as a stand in presenter for Talkradio's Piers Morgan Uncensored while Morgan is on holiday. Morgan is scheduled to return on 5 September.
  - A new relay transmitter is established in Lancashire to provide extra coverage for the local DAB multiplex.
- 2 August – Research carried out by the Jaguar Foundation indicates that less than one per cent of the dance music played on UK radio is made by a female solo artist or all-female band.
- 2–5 August – Essex-based Chelmer Radio broadcasts from the south of France with afternoon presenter Roger Cutting broadcasting his show from the city of Perpignan.
- 3 August –
  - BBC Birmingham announces it will move into new premises built at the former Typhoo Tea factory in the city's Digbeth area, with a date of 2026 set for the move.
  - The BBC announces that Radio Cymru 2's broadcasting hours will be increased from 15 hours a week to 60 hours a week.
- 4 August –
  - The latest RAJAR figures are published, covering the second quarter of 2022. They show an increase in the number of people listening to radio through smart speakers, and for the first time in 23 years a greater percentage of people listening to commercial radio than the BBC, with 49% tuning in to commercial radio compared to 48.1% listening to the BBC. The data also shows that both Talkradio and GB News, which run services simulcast on television and radio, have increase their listening percentages by 6% and 16% respectively in comparison to the previous quarter.
  - Chris Kamara and Ben Shephard launch the Unbelievable! football podcast for BBC Radio 5 Live.
  - LBC announce that Tom Swarbrick will replace Eddie Mair as the host of the station's drivetime show in September, and Ian Payne replaces Swarbrick as host of the 10pm-1am weekday show.
  - The BBC announces it will hold an independent barrister-led inquiry into what is known about the conduct of presenter Tim Westwood following a number of complaints against him.
- 5 August –
  - Former BBC presenter Alex Belfield is found guilty of four counts of cyberstalking individuals he targeted with emails, social media posts and YouTube videos.
  - Sky Sports football commentator Martin Tyler apologises after referring to "Hillsborough and other hooligan-related issues" in an interview for BBC Radio 4's Today Programme in which he was speaking about the 1992 launch of the Premier League.
  - Heart is named as an official partner of Brighton and Hove Pride.
- 5–7 August – Radio 1's Dance Weekend from The UK and Ibiza takes place.
- 6 August – As the 2022–23 English football season gets under way, the Saturday afternoon classified football results are absent from BBC Radio 5 Live's Sports Report. On 8 August the station announces it has dropped the results, read by Charlotte Green, from the programme because it has been shortened to make way for the 5.30pm Live Premier League commentary. The results continue on both LBC and Talksport, with LBC moving them from a pre-recorded slot later on Saturday to a live broadcast at 5.05pm from the following Saturday, 13 August (talkSPORT has always broadcast them live).
- 7 August –
  - June Spencer makes her final appearance in The Archers as Peggy Woolley, having joined the show as one of the original cast in 1950. She is the last original cast member to leave the show, having decided to retire at the age of 103.
  - BBC Radio 1Xtra hosts the official 2022 Commonwealth Games closing party, 1Xtra x Introducing Birmingham Showcase, at The Mill and is presented as part of the Birmingham 2022 Festival.
  - Franz Ferdinand frontman Alex Kapranos joins Absolute Radio to present a six-part series.
  - Radio Today reports that Ofcom have cancelled the awarding of the Welsh Valleys small scale DAB licence at the request of the winner, GTFM, as it could not deliver the eight transmitters required for the service within the eighteen month timeline that had been agreed.
- 8 August –
  - Robert Bruce joins the Capital XTRA Breakfast Show to co-present alongside Shayna Marie Birch-Campbell.
  - KISS afternoon presenter Tyler West is named as a contestant in Series 20 of BBC One's Strictly Come Dancing.
- 9 August –
  - Rakeem Omar takes over as BBC Radio WM's breakfast show presenter, succeeding Elise Evans.
  - Ofcom finds Belfast FM in breach of its licence following a complaint that it had not complied with a commitment to broadcast a minimum of 10 hours of original content each day.
- 10 August – Bauer Media Audio launches a radio content subscription service in Norway.
- 11 August – Hits Radio Breakfast presenter Fleur East is confirmed as a contestant on Series 20 of Strictly Come Dancing.
- 12 August – Absolute Radio 60s dedicates a day of programming to pirate radio stations to mark the anniversary of the Marine Broadcasting Offences Act 1967 which made them illegal.
- 13 August –
  - BBC Radio Scotland sports presenter Laura McGhie begins presenting weekend overnights on BBC Radio 5 Live, succeeding Hayley Hassall.
  - On her Saturday morning Radio 2 show, Claudia Winkelman announces that radio and television presenter Helen Skelton will join Series 20 of Strictly Come Dancing.
- 14 August –
  - Paul O'Grady presents his final Sunday afternoon show on Radio 2, having decided to leave the network. He is reported to be unhappy with a change in format to his show that gave it two 13-week runs a year rather than a continuous weekly programme.
  - Helen Skelton launches a new Sunday morning show on BBC Radio 5 Live, replacing Laura Whitmore.
  - Fee Mak takes over the Sunday Breakfast Show on BBC 1Xtra, succeeding DJ Cuppy.
  - Boom Radio dedicates a day of programming to pirate radio, with shows presented by Johnnie Walker, John Peters, Roger Day, Dave Lee Travis and Keith Skues.
- 16 August – Global's digital ad exchange DAX retains its exclusive audio advertising contract with SoundCloud
- 19 August –
  - Jazz FM launches its occasional Guest Head of Music feature, allowing an artist whose music is played on the station to choose the day's playlist. The first Guest Head of Music is Emma-Jean Thackray.
  - The presenting team for Blackpool's Central Radio is unveiled ahead of its launch in September, with Danny Matthews, formerly of Key 103, presenting the flagship Central Radio Breakfast Show.
  - Ten radio stations whose bid to run the Bradford small-scale DAB multiplex was unsuccessful have decided to boycott the provider which secured the licence because of a belief that the winner is providing a weak local service.
- 22 August –
  - Stockport's Strawberry Radio have hired Terry Christian to present a Sunday evening show dedicated to the music of Manchester.
  - Free Radio breakfast show presenters JD and Roisin are invited to leave their handprints in concrete during a visit to a new housing development in the Houlton area of Rugby as part of a planned feature paying tribute to the development's former use as a radio transmission site.
- 25 August –
  - Scott Mills and Chris Stark present their final show for Radio 1.
  - Heat Radio, owned by Bauer Media, has announced a partnership with the daily news podcast The Smart 7 to launch its own podcast, The heat 7, which will launch on 5 September.
  - kmfm confirms that Garry Wilson is being joined by Chelsea Little to co-present Breakfast as a permanent replacement for Laura Crockett, who has decided not to return to the programme.
- 26 August –
  - Vanessa Feltz presents her final show for BBC Radio London after more than two decades on the air.
  - Roger Bolton presents his final edition of BBC Radio 4's Feedback, telling viewers he has been removed from the programme. Speaking about his departure a few days hater Bolton suggests the BBC is "spooked" by a decline in younger listeners tuning in to traditional radio broadcasts.
- 30 August –
  - Launch of The News Agents, a daily podcast from Global Media presented by Emily Maitlis, Jon Sopel and Lewis Goodall. The opening edition, titled Trump – Prison or President?, focuses on the FBI investigation into Donald Trump's handling of presidential documents, with Anthony Scaramucci, the former White House Director of Communications, appearing as a guest.
  - Ofcom approves a format change for Wave 105 to enable its 105.8FM frequency to take networked content from Greatest Hits Radio, while its 105.2FM frequency will continue to carry local content.
  - Juice FM Belfast, Blackburn's 102.2 and Community Voice FM are found to have breached their Ofcom key commitments in the content they provide.
- 31 August –
  - Connor Morgans has been elected as Programming Co-Ordinator Trustee for Bridgend's Hospital Radio becoming, at the age of 22, the station's youngest trustee.
  - Bristol-based community station SWU.FM announces its intention to close the following day citing the rising cost of running the service, but its livestream continues to broadcast after its planned closure date.

=== September ===
- 2 September – University Radio York has been awarded a limited five-year licence by Ofcom to broadcast on 88.3FM to the University of York after taking part in a broadcasting trial on FM of stations which broadcast to an area of a maximum of 1 kilometre for the past year. It was the only student radio station to do so.
- 3 September –
  - Patrick Kielty succeeds Scott Mills and Chris Stark as presenter of the Saturday morning programme on BBC Radio 5 Live.
  - Classic FM airs Remembering Bill Turnbull a tribute to presenter Bill Turnbull. The programme is presented by Aled Jones and airs from 10am to 1pm in the slot when Turnbull presented his Classic FM show.
  - The online station House Party Radio launches on DAB in Glasgow.
- 4 September – Kate McCann and Adam Boulton begin co-presenting a Sunday morning politics programme for Times Radio.
- 5 September –
  - BBC Sounds announces the launch of its Local to Me section which will provide podcasts focusing on local topics, such as news, sport and music.
  - Vanessa Feltz begins presenting Drivetime on Talkradio, replacing Jeremy Kyle.
  - Omah Howard joins Capital XTRA to present the weekday evening show from 7–10pm.
  - Classic FM broadcasts a concert from St Margaret's, Braemar attended by Prince Charles to celebrate its 30th anniversary on air.
  - Heart and Amazon have teamed up to run an advertising campaign on radio, television and social media.
  - Publication of Essential Media Journalism: The Law for Radio Podcasts & Social Media by Paul Chantler, with a foreword by Huw Edwards.
- 6 September – Michelle Donelan is appointed Secretary of State for Culture, replacing Nadine Dorries.
- 7 September –
  - The 2022 Radio Academy Festival is held at the headquarters of the Royal College of Physicians, near Regent's Park. The event includes the awarding of three new Radio Academy Fellowships, to Mohit Bakaya, Karen Pearson, and Victoria Easton-Riley.
  - BBC Radio 1Xtra cancels its BBC Radio 1Xtra Live event scheduled for 15 October due to increasing financial costs and pressure on the schedules of the musicians due to take part.
- 8 September –
  - BBC Radio 1 invites applications for its 2022 Christmas Takeover which gives airtime to new presenting talent over the festive season.
  - LBC unveils a new weekend schedule, with Lewis Goodall and Sangita Myska joining the network.
  - Regular programming on UK radio stations is suspended as broadcasters enter "obit mode" following the death of Queen Elizabeth II, which is announced at 18:30. BBC stations air simulcast news coverage while advertisements are suspended on commercial radio. Global stations (Capital, Heart, Radio X and Smooth) briefly play solemn music following the announcement before taking on a special programme from LBC. Tonight's performance at the BBC Proms, not broadcast, is confined to the Philadelphia Orchestra playing the National Anthem and "Nimrod" from Elgar's Enigma Variations.
- 9 September –
  - Programmes remain suspended on all radio networks following the death of Queen Elizabeth II. BBC Radio stations play a stripped back playlist of music all day, whilst commercial networks play easy listening music with minimal announcements, extended news bulletins and no advertisements.
  - The BBC Radio 2 Live in Leeds Festival, scheduled for 17 and 18 September, is cancelled following the death of Queen Elizabeth II. The Last Night of the Proms, scheduled for 10 September, is also cancelled.
  - Radio News Hub announces it will offer radio stations a free 10-minute news bulletin covering Royal events following the Queen's death and running for the next ten days, with a lunchtime and evening edition.
  - Talksport suspends presenter Trevor Sinclair while it investigates a Twitter post he made an hour after the news of the Queen's death was announced in which he said racism "had been allowed to thrive" in Britain and that "black and brown" people should not mourn. Sinclair later deleted the tweet and deactivated his Twitter account.
- 11 September – Radio 4's The Archers pays tribute to the Queen in a specially recorded scene that airs at the beginning of the day's episode.
- 12 September –
  - Alan Davey, Controller of BBC Radio 3, as well as BBC Proms, and BBC Orchestras and Choirs, announces he is leaving the BBC in March 2023.
  - Rima Ahmed joins BBC Radio Leeds as breakfast show presenter, replacing Richard Stead who moves to afternoons.
  - Graham Torrington joins North Derbyshire Radio to cover Late Night Love for three weeks while regular presenter Richard Spinks is away.
  - North East Somerset's Somer Valley FM announces a new autumn schedule that will see it airing 100 hours of local content each week.
- 15 September – Bauer Media Audio UK has launched a radio subscription service in Finland, following similar services previously launched in Denmark, Norway and the UK.
- 16 September –
  - Former BBC radio presenter Alex Belfield is sentenced to five and a half years' imprisonment at Nottingham Crown Court after being convicted of four counts of stalking broadcasters, including Jeremy Vine.
  - Jack Saunders takes over as presenter of the Radio 1 Chart Show, succeeding Scott Mills.
- 18 September – Magic Radio's event "Magic at the Musicals" returns to the Royal Albert Hall, with Jason Manford and Ruthie Henshall once again presenting the event.
- 19 September –
  - Coverage of the state funeral of Queen Elizabeth II is provided on radio. On the BBC, coverage is presented by Martha Kearney and simulcast on BBC Sounds, BBC Radio 4, BBC Radio 5 Live, BBC Radio Scotland and BBC Radio Wales. BBC Radio 2 and BBC Radio 3 also provide coverage of the state funeral. Advertising is paused for the day on the UK's two main commercial radio networks, Bauer Radio and Global Radio, with scheduled programming running but cutting to news from the proceedings.
  - Wave 105's Poole transmitter relays Greatest Hits Radio Dorset, with Wave 105 remaining on its main transmitter.
  - Greatest Hits Radio is removed from FM frequencies in Central Southern England, Suffolk and East Yorkshire, while Hits Radio disappears from FM in Hampshire, as Nation Broadcasting ends its franchising agreement with Bauer Media.
- 20 September – The 2022 Tuning In Conference is held at London's Kings Place, with speakers including the Rt Hon Michael Gove.
- 21 September –
  - Launch of UK Radio Portal on Freeview channel 277, giving radio stations a chance to join Freeview Play without having to pay for a full channel. Content is streamed on the channel from internet feeds, allowing viewers to select a station to play.
  - The Radio Today website reports that "I Shall Remember This", a poem dedicated to the Queen and read by a seven-year-old boy on BBC Radio Cumbria, has been viewed on social media more than two million times.
- 22 September – Trade body Audio UK urges Ofcom to reinstate BBC quotas for key radio and audio genres such as drama and comedy after noting a fall in the amount of specific programming on Radio 4 in recent years.
- 23 September –
  - Happy Radio announces plans to expand its DAB coverage across the north west.
  - Heart Christmas is launched on the Sound Digital platform three months ahead of Christmas.
- 24 September – It is confirmed that Jane Garvey and Fi Glover will leave the BBC to present an afternoon show on Times Radio from Mondays to Thursdays starting on 10 October. They will also present a podcast for Times Radio.
- 25 September – BBC 1Xtra airs a special two-hour edition of the Official Afrobeats Chart Show to celebrate its first anniversary.
- 26 September –
  - BBC Radio 3 publishes its autumn schedule, which includes an eight-hour special of non stop music and archive speech to celebrate the BBC's centenary.
  - Canalside Radio in north east Cheshire is found to be in breach of its Ofcom key commitments after failing to broadcast the required amount of original content. In response, the station describes the commitments as a "nuisance", a "distraction" and a "red herring".
- 27 September – Lymm Radio in South Cheshire is awarded £9,950 from The National Lottery Community Fund so that it can hire its first Radio Manager.
- 29 September –
  - Prime Minister Liz Truss gives a series of interviews to BBC Radio Leeds, BBC Radio Norfolk, BBC Radio Kent, BBC Radio Lancashire, BBC Radio Nottingham, BBC Radio Tees, BBC Radio Bristol and BBC Radio Stoke to defend her recent mini-budget.
  - The BBC World Service announces plans to close its Arabic, Persian, Kyrgyz, Uzbek, Hindi, Bengali, Chinese, Indonesian, Tamil and Urdu radio services with the loss of 380 jobs.
  - Caryl Parry Jones presents her final breakfast show for BBC Radio Cymru 2 ahead of a move to BBC Radio Cymru to present late nights.
- 30 September –
  - Steve Wright in the Afternoon airs on Radio 2 for the final time.
  - Launch of the Beeb Watch podcast, presented by Roger Bolton. In the first edition, former BBC News Europe and North America Editor Mark Mardell reveals that he has been diagnosed with Parkinson's disease.

=== October ===
- 3 October –
  - OJ Borg presents the weekday afternoon show on BBC Radio 2, doing so until Scott Mills joins at the end of the month.
  - BBC Radio Cymru 2 launches an additional two-hour show on weekdays, in addition to the station's breakfast shows and additional sports coverage – the station also begins to play a greater proportion of English-language chart music.
  - Heidi Secker begins presenting weekday afternoons on Greatest Hits Radio's East region, replacing Rob Chandler.
  - Graham Torrington joins MKFM in Milton Keynes to present Late Night Graham Torrington from Sundays to Thursdays, with MKFM planning to syndicate the show at a later date. He also continues to present on Boom Radio on Fridays and Saturdays.
  - TalkSPORT launches a campaign to promote the football commentaries that will appear on the network during the coming football season.
  - Arqiva have appointed BT executive Sarah Jane Crabtree as their Chief People Officer.
  - Ofcom has received a request from Jack Media to replace JACK3 Chill with JACK2 Hits on 107.9 FM in Oxford, reversing a 2019 move that saw JACK3 Chill replace JACK2 Hits on the frequency with the latter moving online.
- 4 October –
  - Radio 2 names Owain Wyn Evans as Early Breakfast presenter, replacing Vanessa Feltz. He will present the show from Cardiff from January 2023, making Early Breakfast the first weekday Radio 2 programme to move away from London.
  - The BBC have secured exclusive audio highlights to the 2021 Women's Rugby World Cup, with coverage airing on BBC Radio 5 Live, BBC Radio 5 Live Extra and BBC Sounds.
- 6 October –
  - Heart Breakfast presenter Amanda Holden attempts the Three Peaks Challenge in aid of Global's Make Some Noise campaign.
  - Bauer Media Advertising have appointed George Butler to the newly created role of Head of Commercial Marketing.
- 7 October – Global's Make Some Noise has raised £2.7 million for local charities following a day of special programming the previous day.
- 8 October–12 November – Radio 5 Live and Radio 5 Live Extra air coverage of the 2021 Women's Rugby World Cup after the BBC secured exclusive UK audio rights to the competition. Coverage also appears on BBC Sounds. This is the first time that a women's rugby union tournament has received full live coverage on British radio.
- 10 October –
  - On World Mental Health Day, the Prince and Princess of Wales visit BBC Radio 1 to take part in a special edition of Newsbeat focusing on young people and mental health. The programme is broadcast the following day.
  - Jane Garvey and Fi Glover launch their weekday afternoon show on Times Radio.
  - Chris Stark joins Capital Breakfast to present alongside Roman Kemp, Sian Welby and Sonny Jay, while Rio Fredrika takes over mid-mornings. Stark also becomes Creative Executive Producer.
  - Times Radio launches a new weekday evening schedule, with Kait Borsay presenting from 8.00 to 10.00pm, and new late night shows for Henry Bonsu and Darryl Morris.
  - Ofcom finds six community radio stations – Moorlands Radio, Revolution Radio, First FM, Corby Radio, Takeover Radio, and Gravity FM – in breach of their licence agreements. Breaches range from broadcasting advertising during a news bulletin, playing a song containing an expletive, not broadcasting enough speech and not broadcasting at all.
- 11 October – Boom Radio have launched a £1m year-long advertising campaign featuring their presenter David Hamilton.
- 12 October – BBC Local Radio launches its Walk & Talk campaign for Children in Need 2022. The campaign seeks to highlight the benefits of walking and talking by encouraging people to visit a favourite place with friends and raise money for Children in Need.
- 13 October –
  - CountryLine Radio have signed Matt Spracklen to present the weekday mid-morning show.
  - 90 editions of Radio 4's Desert Island Discs thought to have been lost have been found by radio enthusiast Richard Harrison. The programmes include guests such as Bing Crosby, Dame Margot Fonteyn, James Stewart, David Hockney and Dirk Bogarde.
- 14 October –
  - Andrea Catherwood succeeds Roger Bolton as presenter of Radio 4's Feedback.
  - Radio 1 hosts Europe's Biggest Dance Show 2022, with eleven radio stations from across Europe joining to showcase the best of dance music, and Ukraine's Radio Promin joining for the first time.
  - BBC Political Correspondent Alex Forsyth is announced as the new presenter of Radio 4's Any Questions? from November, replacing previous chair Chris Mason after he was appointed BBC Political Editor.
- 15 October – The BBC apologises after Miriam Margolyes swore live on air during the day's edition of BBC Radio 4's Today programme. She was reacting to seeing the newly appointed Chancellor of the Exchequer, Jeremy Hunt in the studio when she was heard to say "Fuck you, bastard". Presenters Justin Webb and Martha Kearney then asked her to leave.
- 16 October – Richard Digance joins Great British Radio to present a weekly Sunday lunchtime show.
- 17 October – BBC Radio 1 will give 100 young people between the ages of 16 and 24 the chance to spend a minute talking about what makes them who they are as part of the BBC's Centenary celebrations. The "Minute of Me" feature will run over ten days.
- 18 October – Blackpool's Central Radio have signed former Heart Drive presenter Chris Kirk to present weekday daytimes.
- 19 October –
  - Podcast Radio outlines its plans to expand to the US at its Podcast Futures event at NAB Show New York.
  - Magic Radio have appointed former BBC Radio 1 and 1Xtra Editor Rachel Mallender as their Content Director.
  - Bauer Radio appoints Nick Pitts, Content Director at Jazz FM, to also oversee content at Scala Radio.
- 21 October – The seventh annual Local Radio Day is held, with this year's theme being Celebrating the Sound.
- 11 October – The radio-on-your-TV service from UK Radio Portal becomes available on Amazon Fire TV.
- 24 October –
  - GenX Radio Suffolk presenter Tim Gough dies of a heart attack at the age of 55 while presenting the station's breakfast show.
  - Will Manning replaces Ant Payne on Capital Drive.
  - Mark Goodier begins counting down the top 300 songs of the 1970s, 1980s and 1990s for Greatest Hits Radio.
  - Bauer Media moves Radio Borders from Galashiels to the new Edinburgh headquarters. News, sport and weather, as well as Greg and Lynsey at Breakfast will continue to broadcast to the Radio Borders area.
  - Virgin Radio launches its Autumn schedule, which includes Jayne Middlemiss presenting weekday afternoons.
  - Ofcom has resolved an issue regarding a breach of licence agreement by Oban FM, which was off-air for five months due to problems securing an internet link for new premises, an occurrence which Ofcom deems to have been beyond the control of the community station.
  - New logos are launched for London's Lyca Radio and Lyca Gold.
- 25 October – Absolute Radio's breakfast show airs the debut recording of its "The Band of Mum and Dad" project. Six listeners who had previously been members of bands were chosen to form a band, and have recorded a version of the Kings of Leon song "Sex on Fire".
- 27 October –
  - The RAJAR figures for the third quarter of 2022 are published, and show a general decline in the number of listeners to BBC radio but an increase in listeners to commercial stations. The figures show an average of 49.7 million adults (or 88.8% of the adult population) listening for an average of 20.6 hours a week.
  - Michael Hill, the founder and managing director of Radioplayer announces he is leaving for a job in the charity sector.
- 28 October –
  - BBC Asian Network celebrates its 20th anniversary as a national station on DAB.
  - Jamie Laing joins Matt Edmondson to co-present weekend afternoons on Radio 1, covering for Mollie King while she is on maternity leave.
- 31 October –
  - Scott Mills makes his weekday afternoon debut on Radio 2.
  - Salma El-Wardany succeeds Vanessa Feltz as presenter of the breakfast show on BBC Radio London from Mondays to Thursdays, with Riz Lateef presenting on Fridays.
  - Former Capital and Metro Radio presenter Matt Bailey begins presenting the breakfast show on BBC Radio Newcastle.
  - Major cutbacks to BBC Local Radio are announced. Stations will only be local from 6am until 2pm on weekdays with all other programming, apart from live sport, being broadcast on neighbouring stations. The cuts will also see the return of a fully networked weeknight show, airing from 10pm.
  - Radio X breakfast show presenter Chris Moyles is confirmed as a contestant on I’m a Celebrity... Get Me Out Of Here!.

=== November ===
- 1 November – Media minister Julia Lopez says the government is "concerned" and "disappointed" by planned cuts to BBC local radio output, which it is feared could have an impact on the delivery of local content.
- 2 November –
  - The BBC announces plans to close Wogan House (formerly Western House) in London and Bridge House in Salford, with radio broadcasting from Wogan House being moved to Broadcasting House in London.
  - Global launch a new logo for the Capital network, which dispenses with the FM frequencies.
  - Radio Today reports that Shine Radio in Petersfield is using recordings of local primary school children for its on air time checks.
  - Radio West Norfolk, which launched online in November 2020, is added to DAB in King's Lynn.
- 3 November – The BBC announces plans to celebrate the 70th anniversary of the UK Singles Chart, with programmes on Radio 1 and Radio 2 over the weekend of 11 and 12 November playing the most streamed songs from each year of the chart from a list prepared by The Official Charts Company.
- 3–5 November – BBC Music Introducing Live is held across 35 BBC local radio stations, BBC Radio 1, BBC 1Xtra and 6 Music, and also includes 17 live events. It features live and on-air gigs, masterclasses, practical workshops, talks and Q&A sessions around the UK.
- 4 November –
  - Riz Lateef makes her debut as breakfast presenter on BBC Radio London.
  - Steve Lamacq presents a live show from Maida Vale for BBC 6 Music T-shirt Day.
- 4–5 November – Pet Classics returns to Classic FM for a fifth year, with Charlotte Hawkins presenting soothing music to calm listeners' pets over Bonfire Night.
- 5 November – BBC Asian Network presents Asian Network Certified, a night of live music performances to celebrate its 20th birthday. The event is hosted by the station's Nikita Kanda and AJD, and takes place in Birmingham.
- 7 November –
  - Shaun Keaveny joins Greatest Hits Radio to provide cover for Mark Goodier's mid morning show.
  - Author Vicky Pattison joins Heart North East to cover Russ Morris's drivetime show.
  - Ofcom closes an investigation into Wirral-based Flame Christian & Community Radio, which had been off-air for ten months. The station's transmitter had been damaged in Storm Arwen in November 2021 but the station continued to stream online until analogue broadcasting resumed in September 2022. Ofcom deemed the break in transmission to be "outside of the station's control".
  - Ofcom finds GB News Radio in breach of the broadcasting code Rule 6.0 for not providing notification of all parties and candidates standing in the 2022 Birmingham Erdington by-election during an on air discussion on 2 March. While the channel did show onscreen details of the candidates during the To the Point debate on 2 March, the same information was not provided for its radio simulcast.
  - Warrington Hospital's General Radio celebrates its 65th anniversary.
- 8 November –
  - Virgin Radio 80s Plus launches "My 80s Playlist", a new feature where special guests choose their favourite songs from the 1980s. The feature is presented by Steve Denyer.
  - Black Country Radio's new £100,000 studios, based at Brierley Hill, are officially opened by Andy Street, the Mayor of the West Midlands.
  - Fun Kids have launched a new interactive version of their Story Quest podcast that will see listeners suggesting story content that the station's team will then bring to life.
- 9 November – LBC reporter Charlotte Lynch gives an on air account of her arrest at a Just Stop Oil protest on the M25 the previous day after Hertfordshire Police refused to believe she was attending the event in her capacity as a journalist.
- 10 November –
  - Bauer Media has agreed to purchase Cork's Red FM in Ireland subject to regulatory approval.
  - Bauer's Cash for Kids Sports Challenge has granted over £1million to grassroots sports organisations in the UK.
- 11 November – Hits Radio presents Hits Live Manchester, featuring Sam Smith, Craig David, Tom Grennan and Sigala.
- 12 November – Hits Radio presents Hits Live in Birmingham, featuring Lewis Capaldi, Sam Ryder, Blue, Ellie Goulding and Dermot Kennedy.
- 14 November –
  - 100th anniversary of the first BBC broadcast, a news bulletin aired by 2LO at 6.00pm on 14 November 1922.
  - Launch of a new Virgin Radio television commercial featuring Chris Evans and Graham Norton.
- 15 November –
  - KISS announces the launch of ten new stations on its KISS Premium online platform, including On the Dancefloor with Tyler West and KISSTORY 80s.
  - Fix Radio, which does not take part in RAJAR, has published its listening figures, which it says have increased by 80% since its national launch in May 2022. The station, which is aimed at tradespeople, says it had a weekly audience of 146,592 during October, with a collective audience of 211,092.
- 16 November – Scott Mills begins a 24-hour treadmill challenge to raise money for Children in Need, even presenting his afternoon Radio 2 show while walking, jogging and running. £1 million has been raised by the following day.
- 17 November – The 2022 Student Radio Awards are held in London.
- 19 November – The UK Community Radio Network's National Connecting Communities Conference takes place at King's House Conference Centre in Bedford.
- 20 November – Boom Radio celebrates the 70th anniversary of the UK Singles Chart with a day of programming dedicated to the charts presented by John Peters, Simon Bates, Mike Read and David Jensen. The shows will include a countdown of the first chart from 1952 presented by Peters.
- 21 November –
  - Boom Radio have signed Paul O'Grady to present a show on Christmas Day similar to the one he presented for BBC Radio 2.
  - Ofcom has found Felixstowe Radio in breach of its broadcasting conditions for failing to air eight hours of original content on a particular day; on the day concerned only two hours of original output was broadcast, something Felixstowe Radio attributed to factors including presenter absences and technical problems.
- 22 November –
  - Times Newspapers Ltd, owners of Times Radio, announces a change of name to Times Media.
  - Global's Make Some Noise Night is held at The Londoner Hotel in Leicester Square, raising £1,031,502 for charity.
- 23 November –
  - BBC Radio 2 announces it will dedicate five hours of programming to Take That on New Year's Day 2023, including a two-hour countdown of their top hits.
  - Appearing on BBC Radio 4's The Media Show, BBC football presenter Gary Lineker says he and the BBC should have spoken out more about human rights issues during the 2018 FIFA World Cup in Russia, and describes the event as a case of sportswashing.
  - Podcast Radio have formed a partnership with the National Trust to air their podcasts, covering subjects such as backpacking, cycle touring, walks, hikes and heritage houses.
- 24 November – Planet Rock Presents Zeppelin Symphonic, The Music of Led Zeppelin – A Rock Celebration at the London Palladium.
- 25 November –
  - Magic Radio makes its annual switch to playing 100% Christmas hits for the festive season, the fifth year it has done so. Pure Radio Scotland also switches to an all-Christmas playlist.
  - Greatest Hits Radio presents Party at the Palladium! at the London Palladium.
  - Following an investigation, Ofcom has resolved an issue with the Dartmoor-based Skylark Sounds which was off-air due to difficulties with its transmitters from 8–28 June. Ofcom finds that Skylark did everything they could to make Ofcom aware of the problem, and continued with their off-air commitments to the local community while they could not broadcast.
- 26 November – Magic Radio presents Magic at Christmas at the London Palladium.
- 27 November – The London Palladium plays host to Scala Radio Christmas Live and Absolute Radio Live at the Palladium.
- 28 November –
  - Radio 4's Today programme reveals its list of guest editors, who will edit the programme over the festive season, from 26 December to 2 January. They are Nazanin Zaghari-Ratcliffe, Björn Ulvaeus, Jamie Oliver, Sir Ian Botham, Sir Jeremy Fleming, Dame Sharon White, and Anne-Marie Imafidon.
  - Kasabian play the O2 Academy Sheffield as part of the Radio X Presents promotion with Barclaycard.
  - Paul "Goffy" Gough announces his departure from BBC Radio Tees after ten years at the station; he will leave at the end of the year.
- 29 November –
  - BBC Northern Ireland announces plans to axe 35–40 posts, which will result in BBC Radio Foyle losing its breakfast show, and BBC Radio Ulster losing its weekly business show. Local news bulletins are also at risk in the £2.3m cost-cutting drive.
  - BBC Radio 6 Music unveils its top ten albums of the year, with number one named as Mr. Morale & The Big Steppers by Kendrick Lamar.
  - Bauer announces that Cumbria-based CFM will rebrand as Greatest Hits Radio in April 2023. Bauer also announces that two of Staffordshire-based Signal 1's three FM transmitters will be replaced by Greatest Hits Radio in January 2023.

=== December ===
- 1 December –
  - BBC Director of Nations Rhodri Talfan Davies and BBC Director of England Jason Horton appear before the Digital, Culture, Media and Sport Committee to answer questions about planned cuts to BBC Local Radio. The committee is told that the plans currently in place may change before they are implemented.
  - Gaydio breakfast presenters Paris and Dave begin a 24-hour live broadcast to raise money for the Terrence Higgins Trust.
- 3 December – Conservative MP and former Culture Minister Ed Vaizey joins Times Radio to present a weekly news review programme.
- 4 December –
  - Channel 103's 2022 Jersey Christmas Appeal has raised £101,193 for good causes on the island.
  - The online station House Party Radio has launched on DAB in Blackpool, the Radio Today website reports.
- 6 December – BBC Radio 3 confirms that production of eight of its regular programmes will move to Manchester from 2024; the programmes include Music Matters, Jazz Record Requests, Essential Classics, Through the Night and Sunday Breakfast.
- 8 December –
  - Radio 2 in Concert returns with a performance from Lewis Capaldi at the BBC Radio Theatre in Broadcasting House. The concert is recorded for broadcast on 15 December.
  - Mike Huston is appointed as managing director of Great British Radio.
  - Bauer have appointed Lucy Thomas, Sky's current Group Chief Data Officer, as their new Chief Financial and Operating Officer; she will join them on 1 May 2023.
  - Lyca Radio have partnered with Asian broadcaster Utsav Plus to provide coverage of the 2022 Indian Television Academy Awards.
  - Sunrise Radio is announced as the official radio partner for the Qawwali Mehfil of 2023, taking place in July 2023.
- 9 December –
  - Neil Sloan, current Group Content Director at Communicorp UK, has been appointed Managing Editor at BBC Radio Wales.
  - Jason Horton is appointed as Director of Production for BBC Local services across England, taking up the role with immediate effect.
- 10–11 December – Capital's Jingle Bell Ball returns to London's O2 Arena, and is also livestreamed on Global Player.
- 11 December – Jack2 Hits will return to the 107.9FM frequency in Oxford following Ofcom approval for a change in content; the frequency has broadcasts Jack3 Chill since 2020, which will return to being an online station.
- 15 December – Sonny Jay confirms he is leaving Capital Breakfast after five years to present Capital's weekday late night show from January 2023.
- 16 December – Virgin Radio 80s Plus have hired Pete Waterman to present two classic 80s Party shows on Christmas Eve and New Year's Eve.
- 17 December – The George Pub in London's Great Portland Street plays host to a reunion of 1980s presenters at Capital and Chiltern Radio.
- 18 December – BBC Radio Wales publishes its Christmas schedule, which includes programmes from personalities such as Amy Dowden, Wynne Evans, Bryn Terfel, Amy Wadge, Aleighcia Scott and Scott Quinnell and his family.
- 19 December – Arqiva have appointed Gaurav Jandwani as the executive director of Media & Broadcast.
- 20 December –
  - Ofcom finds Worthy FM, the Glastonbury Festival's radio station, in breach of its regulations for playing the track "Miss Understood" by Little Simz, a track containing expletives, at 6.41pm during the 2022 Festival, before the watershed.
  - kmfm and Kent-based company Bargain Hunter UK have delivered over 10,000 toys for their 2022 Give A Gift campaign.
- 23 December –
  - Bauer Radio presenters across the network's breakfast shows announce that the company's Cash for Kids Mission Christmas has raised over £14million.
  - Following their Christmas Present Appeal, Northampton's NLive Radio announces they have delivered 600 presents to those in Need.
  - Beat the Boss comes to an end on BBC Radio Wiltshire.
- 25 December –
  - Radio 1 presents a Christmas Day TikTok Takeover between 2pm and 6pm, with ten presenters from the social media platform presenting 30 minute slots.
  - Former Desert Island Discs presenter Kirsty Young returns to the series as a guest for a Christmas Day special, where she speaks to current presenter Lauren Laverne.
  - The Hits Radio Network airs Christmas. Together, a nationwide programme designed to bring listeners together for Christmas lunch.
- 26 December – Jon Holmes returns to Radio 2 with a one-off show titled Bangers: Mashed celebrating the best song mash-ups.
- 27 December – Jamz Supernova presents her final show on BBC 1Xtra after twelve years with the network. CassKidd takes over the show from January 2023.
- 31 December –
  - Among those from the world of broadcasting to be recognised in the 2023 New Year Honours are Frank Skinner, John Suchet and YolanDa Brown who receive an OBE, while DJ Spoony receives a British Empire Medal.
  - TalkTV and Talkradio have formed a partnership with Local TV Limited to provide local and national news output to their network of eight regional television channels.

== Station debuts ==
=== Terrestrial ===
- 4 January – GB News Radio
- 14 February –
  - Radio Xtra (previously launched online)
  - Alfred
- 5 March – Embrace 104.7
- 4 April – Great British Radio
- 21 April – Breezy Radio
- 20 May – Heart 00s
- 1 July – Tomorrowland One World Radio
- 1 September – Virgin Radio 80s Plus
- 26 September – Coastal Radio
- September – Central Radio
- 31 December – DevonAIR Gold

=== Online stations ===
- 1 January – Boro Radio
- 10 January – BFBS Best of British
- 28 February – Sentimental Radio
- 4 April – Happy Radio
- 6 July – Boom Light
- 19 July – Podcast Radio Business
- October – Radio Essentials
- 14 November –
  - Absolute Radio Terrace Anthems
  - Absolute Radio Movies
  - Absolute Radio 50s
- 1 December – KL XTRA

== Small-scale multiplex switch-ons ==
- 28 March – Salisbury
- 6 July – Newcastle and Gateshead
- 11 July – Edinburgh
- 14 July – Bradford
- 17 August – Glasgow
- 1 September – Blackpool
- 8 October – Winchester
- 29 October – Dudley & Stourbridge
- 4 November – Cardiff
- 5 December –
  - Bristol
  - Exeter

== Programme debuts ==
- 7 January – The Train at Platform 4 on BBC Radio 4 (2022–Present)
- 9 January – Jazz Meets Classical, a six-part series exploring the relationship between jazz and classical music on Jazz FM and Scala Radio
- 18 April – Cool Skool Sketch Show on kmfm
- 21 April – Paul Sinha's Perfect Pub Quiz on BBC Radio 4 (2022–Present)
- 19 May – DMs Are Open on BBC Radio 4
- 29 May – Black in the Union Jack on BBC 1Xtra and BBC Radio 5 Live
- 13 June – The Men's Room on Talksport
- 29 June – Welcome to the Neighbourhood with Jayde Adams on BBC Radio 4
- 4 August – Unbelievable! on BBC Radio 5 Live
- 5 August – Vernon Kay's Dance Sounds of the 90s on BBC Sounds (7 August on Radio 2)
- 7 August – 60 Years of Magical Reggae with Carroll Thompson on Magic Soul
- 16 August – Living Authentically; Trans Truths (documentary presented by Stephanie Hirst) on Virgin Radio Pride UK
- 30 August – The News Agents from Global Media
- 1 September – The Pluggin Baby Radio Show with Emma Scott (syndicated)
- 4 September –
  - Sunday Morning with Kate McCann and Adam Boulton on Times Radio
  - Across the Table with Simon Rimmer on Scala Radio
- 5 September – The Heat 7 from Planet Radio
- 11 September – BBC Introducing on BBC 1Xtra
- 12 September – Crunch & Roll, podcast presented by John Fox
- 30 September – Been Watch, podcast presented by Roger Bolton
- 9 October – Mindset on Scala Radio with Dr Amir Khan on Scala Radio
- 12 October – The Martin Lewis Podcast on BBC Sounds
- 23 October – Pete Murray In His Own Words, presented by Steve Wright on BBC Radio 2 (available on BBC Sounds from 10 October)
- 6 November – The Scala Radio Residency on Scala Radio

== Continuing radio programmes ==
=== 1940s ===
- Desert Island Discs (1942 – present)
- Woman's Hour (1946 – present)
- A Book at Bedtime (1949 – present)

=== 1950s ===
- The Archers (1950 – present)
- Pick of the Pops (1955 – present)
- The Today Programme (1957 – present)

=== 1960s ===
- Farming Today (1960 – present)
- In Touch (1961 – present)
- The World at One (1965 – present)
- The Official Chart (1967 – present)
- Just a Minute (1967 – present)
- The Living World (1968 – present)

=== 1970s ===
- PM (1970 – present)
- Start the Week (1970 – present)
- You and Yours (1970 – present)
- I'm Sorry I Haven't a Clue (1972 – present)
- Good Morning Scotland (1973 – present)
- Newsbeat (1973 – present)
- File on 4 (1977 – present)
- Money Box (1977 – present)
- The News Quiz (1977 – present)
- Feedback (1979 – present)
- The Food Programme (1979 – present)
- Science in Action (1979 – present)

=== 1980s ===
- Steve Wright in the Afternoon (1981–1993, 1999–2022)
- In Business (1983 – present)
- Sounds of the 60s (1983 – present)
- Loose Ends (1986 – present)

=== 1990s ===
- The Moral Maze (1990 – present)
- Essential Selection (1991 – present)
- Night Waves (1992 – present)
- Essential Mix (1993 – present)
- Up All Night (1994 – present)
- Wake Up to Money (1994 – present)
- Private Passions (1995 – present)
- In Our Time (1998 – present)
- Material World (1998 – present)
- Scott Mills (1998–2022)
- The Now Show (1998 – present)

=== 2000s ===
- BBC Radio 2 Folk Awards (2000 – present)
- Big John @ Breakfast (2000 – present)
- Sounds of the 70s (2000–2008, 2009 – present)
- Dead Ringers (2000–2007, 2014 – present)
- Kermode and Mayo's Film Review (2001–2022)
- A Kist o Wurds (2002 – present)
- Fighting Talk (2003 – present)
- Jeremy Vine (2003 – present)
- The Chris Moyles Show (2004–2012, 2015 – present)
- Elaine Paige on Sunday (2004 – present)
- The Bottom Line (2006 – present)
- The Unbelievable Truth (2006 – present)
- Radcliffe & Maconie (2007 – present)
- The Media Show (2008 – present)
- Newsjack (2009 – present)
- Paul O'Grady on the Wireless (2009–2022)

=== 2010s ===
- The Third Degree (2011 – present)
- BBC Radio 1's Dance Anthems (2012 – present)
- Sounds of the 80s (2013 – present)
- Question Time Extra Time (2013 – present)
- The Show What You Wrote (2013 – present)
- Friday Sports Panel (2014 – present)
- Stumped (2015 – present)
- You, Me and the Big C (2018–present)
- Radio 1's Party Anthems (2019–present)

=== 2020s ===
- Frank Skinner's Poetry Podcast (2020 – present)
- Newscast (2020 – present)
- Sounds of the 90s (2020–present)
- Life Changes (2021–present)
- Romesh Ranganathan: For The Love of Hip Hop (2021–present)

== Ending this year ==
- 1 April – Kermode and Mayo's Film Review (2001–2022)
- 14 August – Paul O'Grady on the Wireless (2009–2022)
- 25 August – Scott Mills (1998–2022)
- 28 August – 60 Years of Magical Reggae with Carroll Thompson (2022)
- 30 September – Steve Wright in the Afternoon (1981–1993, 1999–2022)

== Closing this year ==
Date	Station	Launched
29 March	All Oldies Radio	2016
8 April	Scottish Sun Hits, Scottish Sun Chilled and Scottish Sun 80s	2018
1 June	Virgin Radio Groove	2020
25 October	Buchan Radio	2019
30 December	North Cotswold Community Radio	2007

== Deaths ==
- 1 January – Gary Burgess, 46, presenter (BBC Radio Guernsey, Channel 103, Island FM)
- 10 January – Colin Slater, 87, sports commentator (BBC Radio Nottingham)
- 25 January – Barry Cryer, 86, comedian and writer (I'm Sorry I Haven't a Clue)
- 7 March – Mike Reynolds, 54, presenter (Radio Exe)
- 13 March – Mary Lee, 100, Scottish singer and broadcaster (Radio Clyde)
- 11 April – Phil Holmes, 49, presenter (Sun FM, Minster FM, Real Radio)
- 15 April – Nigel Pearson, 52, sports commentator (BBC Radio Humberside, talkSPORT)
- 16 April – Sir Ray Tindle, 95, President of the Tindle Radio Group
- 1 May – Bill MacDonald, 95, original managing director of Radio Hallam
- 28 May – Bob Hall, sports journalist (Black Country Radio)
- 28 June – Dame Deborah James, 40, journalist, cancer campaigner and podcast presenter (You, Me and the Big C)
- 1 July – Peter Marsham, 47, radio presenter (Yorkshire Coast Radio, Minster FM, Lincs FM, Trax FM, LCR)
- 4 July – Mona Hammond, 91, actress (Mabel Thompson in The Archers).
- 12 July – Robin Valk, 73, Disc jockey and producer (BRMB, BBC Radio 2)
- 13 July – Chris Stuart, 73, presenter (BBC Radio Wales, BBC Radio 2)
- August – Steve Taylor, BBC News correspondent and manager of BBC GMR
- 31 August –
  - Bill Turnbull, 66, presenter (Classic FM)
  - Ambrose Harcourt, radio presenter (Southern Sound, Southern FM, Regency Radio)
- 8 September – Mavis Nicholson, 91, writer and broadcaster
- September – Kim Lenaghan, 61, author and broadcaster (BBC Radio Ulster, Downtown Radio)
- 22 September – Stu Allen, 60, radio presenter (Piccadilly Radio, Key 103)
- October – Mike Skinner, presenter, and chair and director of Uckfield FM
- 9 October – John Perkins, managing director of Independent Radio News (1989–2009)
- 16 October – Gordon Sparks, 61, presenter (BBC Radio Devon)
- 24 October – Tim Gough, 55, radio presenter (Radio Orwell, Radio Trent, Leicester Sound, Saga 106.6 FM, 106.6 Smooth Radio, GenX Radio Suffolk)
- 28 October – Gary Wilkinson, 50, presenter (Atlantic 252, Sun FM, Metro Radio, TFM, Radio Wyvern, Galaxy North East, Galaxy Manchester, MFM, Real Radio)
- 10 December – Victor Lewis-Smith, 65, broadcaster, producer and comedy presenter
- 21 December – Simon Yaxley, 53, broadcaster and actor (Lakeland Radio, BBC Radio Cumbria)
- December –
  - Matthew Carr, 82, presenter (BBC Radio Shropshire)
  - Eddie Startup, 77, radio chief executive

== See also ==
- 2022 in the United Kingdom
- 2022 in British music
- 2022 in British television
- List of British films of 2022
