= List of British podcasts =

The following is a list of British podcasts.

== List ==
Podcast	Year	Starring, Narrator(s), or Host(s)	Produced by	Ref
50 Things That Made the Modern Economy	2016–2017 (series 1), 2019 (series 2)	Tim Harford	BBC	
The Adam Buxton Podcast	2015–present	Adam Buxton	Independent	
Black Gals Livin'	2018–present	Vic and Jas	Independent	
Brown Girls Do It Too	2019–present	Roya, Rubina and Poppy	BBC Asian Network and BBC Sounds	
Can I Interject?	2020–2021	Gregor, Daniel & Neill	Independent	
Centuries of Sound	2017–present	James Errington	Independently produced	
Empire (podcast)	2022–present	William Dalrymple, Anita Anand	Goalhanger Podcasts	
The Great Woman Artists		Katy Hessel	Independent	
Griefcast	2016–2023	Cariad Lloyd	Acast	
Grounded with Louis Theroux	2020–present	Louis Theroux	BBC Radio 4 and BBC Sounds	
Have A Word	2020–present	Adam Rowe, Dan Nightingale, and Carl Reigler	Independent	
Have You Heard George's Podcast?	2019–present	George the Poet	BBC Sounds	
Honey & Co: The Food Talks	2017–present	Sarit and Itamar	Independent	
In Our Time (radio series)	1998–present	Melvyn Bragg (1998–2025); Misha Glenny (2026–present)	BBC Radio 4	
I Weigh With Jameela Jamil	2020–present	Jameela Jamil	Independent	
Kermode and Mayo's Film Review	2005–present	Mark Kermode and Simon Mayo	BBC Radio 5 Live and BBC Sounds	
The Last Bohemians			Independent	
The Log Books		Adam Smith, Tash Walker	Acast	
Linux Outlaws	2007–2014	Fabian Scherschel and Dan Lynch	Sixgun Productions	
Linux Voice	2014–2017	Linux Voice team	Linux Voice team	
The Lovecraft Investigations	2019–2020	Barnaby Kay and Jana Carpenter	BBC Radio 4	
My Dad Wrote a Porno	2015–present	Jamie Morton, James Cooper, Alice Levine	Independent	
Off Menu with Ed Gamble and James Acaster	2018–present	Ed Gamble, James Acaster	Independent	
Paradise	2019		BBC Five Live and BBC Sounds	
Richard Herring's Leicester Square Theatre Podcast (previously Richard Herring's Edinburgh Fringe Podcast)	2011–present	Richard Herring and guests	Go Faster Stripe	
The Rest is Politics	March 2022–present	Alastair Campbell, Rory Stewart	Goalhanger Podcasts	
The Ricky Gervais Show	2005–2011	Ricky Gervais, Stephen Merchant, and Karl Pilkington		
Scottish Independence podcast	2012–present		Independent	
Seancecast	2020–present	Zoë Tomalin and Charlie Dinkin	Hat Trick Productions	
Seemingly Unrelated	2024-Present	Dr. Andrew Johnstone	Life's Little Murder Boards	
Shadows at the Door: The Podcast	2018–present	Mark Nixon and David Ault	Independent	
ShxtsNGigs	2020–present	James Duncan and Fuhad Dawodu	YMU	
Simple Pleasures	2018	Yotam Ottolenghi	Independent	
Soundtracking	2016–present	Edith Bowman	AudioBoom	
Stories of Scotland	2019	Jenny Johnstone and Annie MacDonald	Independent	
Women in Focus (Podcast)	2023–present	Helen Berriman	British Naturism	
You, Me and the Big C	2018–present	Deborah James, Lauren Mahon, Rachael Bland (and others)	BBC	

== See also ==
- Mass media in the United Kingdom
- Radio in the United Kingdom
