= Duncan Barkes =

British broadcaster, columnist, and journalist

Duncan Barkes is a journalist, political commentator and radio presenter who has worked for a number of British talk radio stations including LBC, talkSPORT, BBC Radio Five Live and BBC Radio London. His shows were usually late night or overnight phone-in programmes. Barkes has written for the Daily Express.

== Writing career ==
Barkes has written for the Daily Express. He wrote the "Barkes At Large" column for seven years in various newspapers across West Sussex. In 2015 Barkes wrote a book for LBC, The Dumbing Down Of Britain. He is a member of the Chartered Institute of Journalists.

== Broadcasting career ==
Barkes has worked for regional and commercial stations such as Nation Easy Radio, V2 Radio, Spirit FM, Jazz FM, BBC Southern Counties Radio, Radio City, Radio City Talk, Talksport, and LBC. In 2015 Barkes joined BBC Radio London to present a late night radio phone-in show, which was shortlisted in the Broadcasting Press Guild Awards' Radio Programme of the Year category that year.

== Campaigning career ==
Barkes has worked a campaigner and media consultant managing various press offices and PR departments. He has also campaigned on numerous issues that range from social campaigns protecting local health services to national campaigns conceived to raising awareness issues. During his time campaigning he has worked alongside several politicians, including Ken Livingstone and UKIP leader Nigel Farage. He acted as a spokesperson for Farage after he was involved in a near fatal plane crash.
