= Simple Pleasure =

Simple Pleasure(s) may refer to:

== Music ==
- Simple Pleasure (Eastern Rebellion album) or the title track, 1993
- Simple Pleasure (Tindersticks album), 1999
- Simple Pleasure (Vincent Herring album), 2001
- Simple Pleasures (Alison Brown album) or the title song, 1990
- Simple Pleasures (Bobby McFerrin album) or the title song, 1988
- Simple Pleasures (Ramsey Lewis and Nancy Wilson album), 2003

== Other uses ==
- "Simple Pleasures" (Shameless), a 2014 episode of the American TV series
- Simple Pleasures, a British podcast
