= Lauren Mahon =

British cancer activist and podcaster

- Born: Lauren Stacey Mahon; 2 May 1985 (age 40); Hammersmith, London, England
- Occupations: Cancer activist; podcaster
- Known for: You, Me and the Big C

Lauren Stacey Mahon (born 2 May 1985) is a British cancer activist and founder of Girls vs Cancer, an online community raising awareness and supporting cancer patients. She was named in the BBC 100 Women in 2019.

== Life and career ==
Mahon was diagnosed with grade three breast cancer in 2016 and thought she was going to die because she misunderstood grade three cancer for stage four cancer, which is an advanced cancer. While being treated for cancer, she searched the internet to find people with a similar condition but could not. She then created a blog, Girls vs Cancer, where she shared her cancer experience and designed T-shirts to create awareness. Later she became a co-host of BBC podcast You, Me and the Big C sharing her cancer story in a comic manner. After co-hosts Rachael Bland and Deborah James respectively died of cancer in 2018 and 2022, Mahon became the podcast's sole surviving original host. Mahon was named in the 2019 BBC 100 Women.
