= BBC Radio Explorer =

- Developer: BBC
- Launched: 29 May 2014; 12 years ago
- Discontinued: 15 December 2016; 9 years ago
- Platform: Web
- Website: www.bbc.co.uk/radio/explorer

Radio Explorer was an online radio and playlist streaming application from the BBC originally developed by Jason Williams and launched on 29 May 2014. It later appeared on BBC Taster, the BBC's portal for ideas and experimental projects, in March 2015.

Radio Explorer allowed the streaming of generated playlists based on searches, which would then play continuously. The service discontinued on 15 December 2016 and the development effort and service was rolled into BBC Sounds.

== Development ==
Radio Explorer was developed during the BBC Design + Engineering's 10% time initiative. It was prototyped using the BBC's Forge platform, in order to show content the service took full advantage of Nitro, an API which allowed BBC products to search for content.

After internal usage Radio Explorer went on to become a BBC online service. Radio Explorer worked by searching through programmes titles, subtitles, short synopsis, long synopsis and descriptions. Results were then filtered by those being available to play, including clips. Initially only speech networks were included, but later the service included all BBC networks.

The service was later discussed on BBC Radio 5 Live's Radio Review of 2014 where "Christmas Puddings" was searched for during the show, it also included an interview with Jason Williams. Due to the unfinished nature of the project, it launched without marketing surrounding its release. Instead, BBC Radio 4 made a post on Twitter inviting users to test it, along with a blog post regarding its development.
