= Bob Hall (British journalist) =

British sports journalist (1945–2022)

Bob Hall (1945 – May 2022) was a British sports journalist notable for presenting television sports reports in the English Midlands, where he had a television career spanning four decades. Hall joined ATV Today in 1981 and went on to work for its successor, Central News, where he appeared regularly as a presenter until the early 2000s. Hall was also a contributor to Sky Sports' Soccer Saturday and Black Country Radio. He also briefly worked for the Express & Star newspaper.
