= Weymouth Town Council =

Parish council in England

- Coat of Arms for Weymouth

Type
- Type: Town Council

History
- Founded: 1 April 2019
- Preceded by: Weymouth and Portland

Leadership
- Mayor: David Harris, Liberal Democrats since 13 May 2026
- Leader of the Council: David Civil, Liberal Democrats since May 2026
- Chief Executive: Jane Biscombe

Structure
- Seats: 25 councillors
- Political groups: Liberal Democrats (12) Conservative (7) Labour (4) Green (2)

Elections
- Voting system: Plurality block voting
- Last election: 2 May 2024
- Next election: May 2029

Website
- www.weymouthtowncouncil.gov.uk

Weymouth Town Council is a parish council for Weymouth, in the district and county of Dorset. It is the successor to Weymouth and Portland, after the 2019 restructuring of Dorset. The council covers Weymouth and surrounding areas, including Wyke Regis, Preston, Melcombe Regis, Upwey, Broadwey, Southill, Nottington, Westham and Radipole.

The Council operates a number of services for the town, including allotments, public events, parks, Cemeteries and managing Weymouth Beach.

Weymouth Town Council earned between £3–7 million in 2023–4, putting it in the top three most profitable parish councils.

== History ==
Weymouth Town Council came to exist in 2019, after the County-wide restructuring of Dorset's local governments, and ensured a smooth transition of power of its services and resources. On 1 April 2019, Weymouth & Portland Borough Council was replaced by Weymouth Town Council.

== Governance ==
=== Leadership ===
Since its founding in 2019, the Liberal Democrats have acted as the largest party within the council. Cllr David Harris served as the leader of the Liberal Democrats from 2016 until 2026. In 2026, Cllr David Civil was elected by the council as the new leader of the council.

Councillor	Party	From	To
David Harris	Liberal Democrats	14 May 2019	14 May 2026
David Civil	Liberal Democrats	14 May 2026	Incumbent

=== Mayorship ===
As a Civil parish that has self-described as a "town council" as per the Local Government Act 1972, Weymouth has a Town Mayor as opposed to a traditional chairman seen in standard parish councils.

The Mayor of Weymouth is elected to a one-year term. Mayors must be a councillor and be elected by councillors in a simple majority. Traditionally, the Deputy Mayor is considered Mayor-elect for the next year, however in 2023, Deputy Mayor Tia Roos did not seek election as Mayor. In 2020, Mayor Graham Winter served a second year during the COVID-19 pandemic, to ensure continuity of the mayorship.

Councillor	Party	From	To
Graham Winter	Liberal Democrats	16 May 2019	13 May 2021
Colin Huckle	Labour	13 May 2021	15 May 2022
Ann Weaving	Labour	15 May 2022	10 May 2023
Kate Wheller	Labour Co-op	10 May 2023	15 May 2024
Jon Orrell	Green	15 May 2024	15 May 2025
Caroline Nickinson	Conservative	15 May 2025	13 May 2026
David Harris	Liberal Democrats	13 May 2026	Incumbent

=== Committees and meetings ===
Weymouth Town Council has four committees, which manage different sectors of Council policy and organisation. Those committees are the following:

- Finance & Governance Committee
- Human Resources
- Planning & Licensing
- Environment & Services

Every committee meets approximately once a month, with full council meetings occurring every six weeks.

== Services ==
Weymouth Town Council operates a number of services throughout the town, focusing on tourism, local improvement and cemeteries. This is managed by the Council's Services committee.

=== Weymouth Beach ===
Weymouth Beach is a popular tourist destination, and was a frequent resort for King George III. Weymouth Beach is managed and serviced by Weymouth Town Council. Weymouth Beach's services are carried out by the Beach Team, a group of mostly seasonal staff who maintain the beach, with services including:

- Deckchair, windbreak and sunbed hire schemes
- Toilet cleaning and maintenance
- Public advertising
- Accessibility schemes, including beach wheelchairs
- Lost and Found
- Dog enforcement

Weymouth Beach is known to be a busy and popular destination, with over 2 million visitors per year visiting. The beach, as a result, has the Seaside Award 2025. However, in 2025, Weymouth Central Beach lost the blue flag award, as the cleanliness of the water was downgraded from "excellent" to "good" by the Environmental Agency, as a result of sewage concerns.

Weymouth Town Council and RNLI Weymouth came under controversy in 2025 as the swim-up rafts on the coast were not present in the summer of 2025 for the first time since 2009.

=== Gardens ===
Weymouth has a number of parks in the town, which have 3.6 million visitors per year, according to Weymouth Town Council. Each park is maintained collectively by staff, volunteers, and members of "Friends of Greenspaces", who raise money for a designated park. Weymouth Town Council operates 9 designated "green spaces". Three of their gardens, Greenhill Gardens, Radipole Park and Gardens, and Sandsfoot Gardens, have Green Flag status, designating them as high-quality parks which are well-managed and accessible.

=== Tumbledown ===
Tumbledown Community Growing is a Communal Farm and Garden operated by Weymouth Town Council. The site is utilised for a number of community engagement activities, such as an Orienteering site. The farm also operates to grow crops, which is staffed by volunteers. The farm has over 130 trees in its orchard and has community allotments.

In April 2025, Mayor Jon Orrell and High Sheriff of Dorset Callum Bremner opened the Kestrel Barn, a new classroom building on the site of the farm to operate a Forest school. Among other donors, the Nuclear Restoration Services granted £85,000 towards the project.
