= Three Peaks Challenge =

South African running trail

The Three Peaks Challenge is a mountain running trail that involves ascending the three major peaks above Cape Town, namely Devil's Peak, Table Mountain and Lion's Head.

== History ==
The route was first completed by Carl Wilhelm Schneeberger in 1897. Schneeberger completed the course in 9 hours and 5 minutes, not counting his rest stops at the old Johannesburg Hotel in Long Street after each peak. On the centenary of Schneeberger's feat, Don Hartley and a group of 13 runners took on the challenge on 13 September 1997, and the time has been continually bettered since.

In 2022, the trail was used as a fundraiser to support low-fee Calling Education schools in South Africa.

== Records ==
Bold = current record; an asterisk indicates solo efforts.

Year	Men	Time	Women	Time
1897	Carl Schneeberger *	10:50:00		
1927	Sandy Trimble *	07:17:00		
1977	Geoff Pitter *	06:51:00		
1997	Don Hartley	07:18:00	Catherine Schorr	09:27:00
1998	Danny Biggs	06:07:42	Tanya Katzchner	08:23:07
1999	Glenn Castle	06:41:56	Helen Davies	08:43:15
2000	Arvind Varsani	06:18:20	Tanya Katzchner	07:38:27
2001	Chad Ulansky	05:27:29	Caroline Brawner	07:43:49
2002	Danny Biggs	05:33:51	Sylvie Harris	07:31:19
2003	Danny Biggs	05:44:24	Nicola Le Marquand	07:07:21
2004	Ake Fagereng	06:36:13	Sylvie Harris	06:42:32
2005	Ake Fagereng	05:46:53	Janette Terblanche	07:52:54
2006	Roger Steel	05:56:42	Sylvie Harris	06:17:26
2007	Andrew Hagen	06:11:38	Karen De Kock	07:48:12
2008	Bruce Arnett	05:28:08	Caroline Balkwill	07:40:34
2009	Andrew Hagen	05:34:27	Cherilyn Vossberg	07:09:23
2010	Andrew Hagen	05:23:20	Janette Terblanche	07:28:13
2011	Andre Calitz	05:07:39	Caroline Balkwill	07:14:09
2012	Andre Calitz	04:50:21	Katya Soggott	06:15:27
2013	Charl Souma	05:46:57	Katya Soggott	06:15:02
2014	Martin Kleynhans	05:24:59	Katya Soggott	06:15:44
2015	Martin Kleynhans	05:20:29	Melanie Porter	07:11:28
2016	Andrew Hagen	04:55:13	Jane Wyngaard	06:40:45
2017	Lucky Miya	05:04:55	Karoline Hanks	06:57:20
2018	Kane Reilly	05:15:46	Cleo Albertus	07:16:19
2019	**Kane Reilly**	**04:42:43**	**Julika Pahl**	**06:09:15**
2020	Pete Calitz	05:46:56	Jana Trojan	07:30:54
2021	Luke Roberts	05:30:23	Emily Djock	06:37:01
2022	Pieter Calitz	05:53:53	Liz Robertson	08:18:11
