= Simon Yaxley =

English radio broadcaster and actor (1969–2022)

- Born: 9 May 1969
- Died: 21 December 2022 (aged 53); Carlisle
- Presenting career
- Station: BBC Radio Cumbria (until 2022)
- Station: Lakeland Radio
- Style: Presenter and actor
- Country: United Kingdom

Simon Yaxley (9 May 1969 – 21 December 2022) was a radio broadcaster and actor, best known for his work on BBC Radio Cumbria and Lakeland Radio.

== Career ==
Simon was a radio presenter on various radio stations including Lakeland Radio and on BBC Radio Cumbria in which he hosted The Afternoon Show until his death in December 2022.

In addition to his broadcasting career, Yaxley was well known for his work as an actor in shows and pantomimes across Cumbria.

== Death ==
Simon died at his home in Carlisle on 21 December 2022, aged 53. His death was confirmed by BBC Radio Cumbria the next day. The station posted on social media: "The BBC Radio Cumbria presenter Simon Yaxley has died. He was found at his home in Carlisle yesterday afternoon. He had been a BBC presenter for the past 5 years, and also worked for commercial radio in Cumbria. Our condolences go to his family, friends and listeners."

Many tributes were shared on social media, with BBC Radio Cumbria editor Jonathan Morrell saying "Simon was a lovely, kind man who was quiet and thoughtful off air. On air, a big personality who listeners loved. My condolences to his family, friends and colleagues here. He was a big part of our radio family & will be much missed."

Andy Milliard, who used to co-present with Simon during his time at Lakeland Radio said: "He was just radio through and through, it was his real passion. He was sad when Lakeland Radio finished in this area and he was so chuffed when he got his shot on Radio Cumbria.

Colin Andrews added: "I worked with Simon Yaxley for many years at Lakeland Radio. He was as much a friend outside of work as in."
