= Home Instead =

United Kingdom home care franchise

- Formation: 1994
- Founder: Paul and Lori Hogan
- Headquarters: Omaha, Nebraska
- Region served: United States
- Services: Home care
- Key people: Seth Sternberg (CEO)
- Website: www.homeinstead.com

Home Instead is a network of franchise businesses specializing in non-medical in-home care and support for older people. Founded in 1994, with headquarters in Omaha, it is the largest senior care franchise in the world, with 1200 independently owned and operated offices across six countries. In August 2021, the company was acquired by Honor Technology, based in San Francisco. The organization has been recognized as one of the key providers in the global home care services market.

The company was founded by Paul and Lori Hogan in 1994 and has received recognition for its business success from Entrepreneur Magazine, Franchise Times, the International Franchise Association, and various industry publications. In 2025, Paul and Lori Hogan were inducted into the Nebraska Business Hall of Fame for their significant impact on business and the wider community. Seth Sternberg serves as the current Chief Executive Officer of Home Instead, overseeing the +80 million hours of care Home Instead provides globally.

== United States ==
In the U.S., Home Instead franchises offer an array of nonmedical services, including companionship, personal care, and specialized support for conditions like Alzheimer's and other dementias. The U.S. operation has consistently received high rankings in franchisee satisfaction, being listed in Entrepreneur's 2025 Franchise 500 Hall of Fame in the +25 years category, in The Telegraph's 2024 Best of the Best Awards as a Winner in the Senior Services, In-Home Health Care section, and as the Winner of Franchise Times’ Zor Award as Top Brand to Buy in 2023. More recently, in 2024, Newsweek ranked Home Instead #1 in the Home Care Services for Seniors and Disabled category, while Forbes ranked it #45 on its Best Healthcare Employers for Women list.

While the company maintains high standards of care and service, Home Instead faces challenges in staff recruitment due to sector-wide wage competition, a common problem in the home care industry. Despite these challenges, Home Instead continues to expand its services and maintain its position as a leading provider of senior care services globally.

== Global operations ==
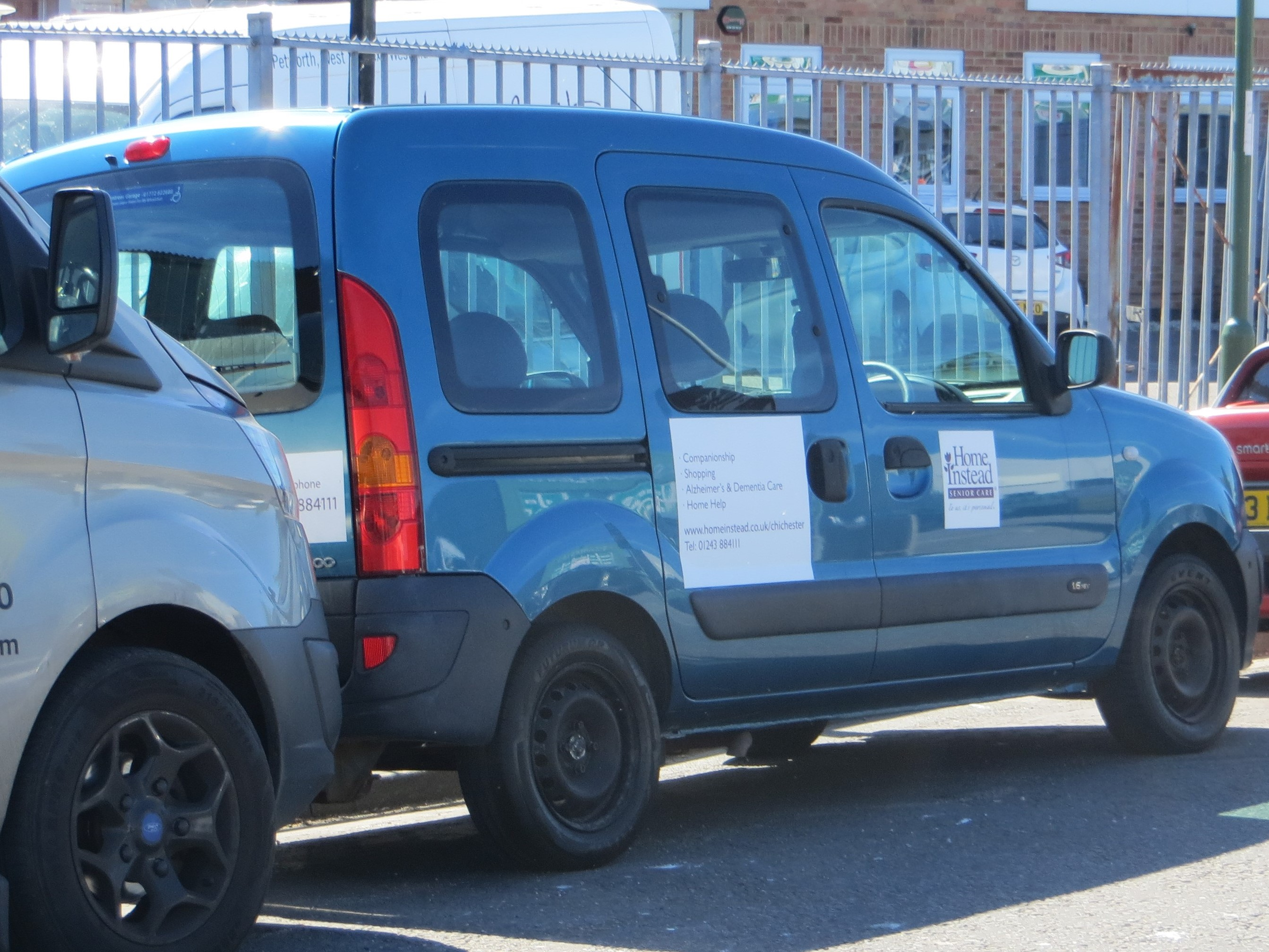
Home Instead Senior Care wheelchair adapted car

=== Canada ===
In 2023, Home Instead was the recipient of the Canadian Franchise Association's Franchisees’ Choice Designation for the 13th year in a row, recognizing superior franchise relations, leadership, communications, and training. The company has been active in community service, organizing annual Christmas gift deliveries to elderly individuals living alone in Toronto since 2013.

=== Germany ===
By November 2018, Home Instead (Seniorenbetreuung) had established 111 franchises throughout Germany.

=== Japan ===
Home Instead has 2 established franchises in Japan.

=== Singapore ===
Home Instead has 1 franchise in Singapore.

=== United Kingdom ===
The UK operation, led by CEO Martin Jones, has grown to 255 franchised offices employing more than 13,000 people since its 2005 establishment in Chester. The company has achieved notable success in quality ratings, with 40 Care Quality Commission (CQC) 'outstanding' ratings across England by 2019, representing 20% of the English network compared to the sector average of 2%.

The company has received numerous accolades, including the Princess Royal Training Award in 2016 and 2019, and was named in the Elite Franchise Top 100 league table in 2020.

== See also ==
- Florida Department of Elder Affairs
- Private healthcare in the United Kingdom
