= Ashdown Radio =

Community radio station in East Sussex, England

- Uckfield; England
- Broadcast area: East Sussex
- Frequencies: 105.0 MHz (Uckfield); 94.7 MHz (Crowborough)

Programming
- Format: Community, speech, adult contemporary, pop music

Ownership
- Owner: Ashdown Radio Limited

History
- First air date: 7 July 2003
- Former names: Uckfield FM (2003–2022)

Technical information
- Transmitter coordinates: 50.9700°N 0.1000°E

Links
- Webcast: www.ashdownradio.com/player/
- Website: www.ashdownradio.com

Ashdown Radio is a community radio station in East Sussex, broadcasting from transmitters in Uckfield and Crowborough. It is owned by Ashdown Radio Limited.

The station began as Uckfield FM in 2003 and operated under 28-day restricted service licences (RSLs) each year from 2003 to 2009. It then returned to the air under a full-time licence in 2010. After expanding to Crowborough, the station rebranded as Ashdown Radio in 2022.

== History ==
=== RSL broadcasts ===
Uckfield FM first launched at 8:00am on Monday, 7 July 2003. The station was founded by Gary King, Mike Skinner, Alan French and the late Paddy Rea.

A temporary studio was situated within a storage and office area at the Picture House Cinema in Uckfield High Street. The station broadcast on 87.9 FM and online; subsequent temporary broadcasts took place on the same frequency. It broadcast each summer in support of the Uckfield Festival by way of a 28-day restricted service licence until 2009.

During the station's time at the Picture House, presenters were live 24 hours a day, to allow for access when the cinema was closed; this was also necessary as the playout system didn't support broadcast automation.

Uckfield Community Radio Limited was formed in late 2006 by Gary King and Mike Skinner. The station moved to its current premises at Bird In Eye Farm in early 2007. Summer broadcasts resumed from the new location that year. Additional-21 day broadcasts took place during December 2007 and 2008, to support Uckfield's late-night shopping event.

=== Full-time broadcasting ===
An application was submitted to Ofcom in November 2008 for a community radio licence to begin full-time broadcasting, which was awarded on 22 July 2009, just after the final restricted service licence broadcast ended. Uckfield FM returned to the air on a full-time basis on 105.0 MHz at 1:05 p.m. on Thursday, 1 July 2010.

Although Uckfield FM was one of a number of community radio stations who had certain key commitments—a requirement of all UK community stations—investigated by Ofcom in late 2014, the licence was extended from 2015 to 2020, and a further extension was confirmed in 2020 for a further five years until 2025.

The schedule was adjusted in March 2020 due to COVID-19. During usual live broadcast hours from 7 a.m. until 10 p.m., additional programmes of (usually) one hour were introduced between programmes being broadcast from Bird in Eye Farm. This is to allow for cleaning of studio equipment and to maintain social distancing. These additional programmes are generally voice-tracked by regular presenters from other locations. In the early days of the pandemic, the station also was the subject of controversy. On 28 February 2020, early in the pandemic Uckfield FM allowed a registered nurse to deliver a 20-minute section on unproven theories falsely alleging that 5G mobile phone networks cause COVID. After multiple complaints to Ofcom, the station was warned for its actions and ordered to take actions for allowing unproven theories to be aired without guests being "sufficiently challenged". The registered nurse was found to be a proponent of alternative medicine and was removed from the nurses' register.

=== Expansion into Crowborough and rebrand ===
On 18 February 2021, the station announced their planned expansion into the nearby town of Crowborough. In view of the expansion, the station announced it would rebrand as Ashdown Radio in October 2021, after the Crowborough transmitter on 94.7 MHz was announced. The Crowborough transmitter began service on 9 February 2022, with the name change following on 1 April; BBC Radio 2 breakfast presenter and local resident Zoe Ball officially opened the expanded station.

=== Proposed DAB broadcasting ===
On 22 July 2024, the station announced plans to broadcast on DAB, after Central Sussex Digital Radio Limited (where Ashdown Radio Limited are a shareholder ) was awarded the licence to operate the small scale DAB multiplex covering Uckfield and Haywards Heath.

No further updates were published and Central Sussex Digital Radio Limited was dissolved in November 2025.

=== Ashdown Retro ===
Spin-off online only station Ashdown Retro was launched on 27 February 2026.

The station plays non-stop music from the 1960s to the 1990s.
