= Greatest Hits Radio West Sussex =

Coordinates: 50.831960°N 0.756844°W

- United Kingdom
- Broadcast area: West Sussex
- Frequencies: FM: 96.6 MHz (Goodwood); 102.3 MHz (Littlehampton); 106.6 MHz (Midhurst)
- RDS: GRT_HITS

Programming
- Format: Classic hits
- Network: Greatest Hits Radio

Ownership
- Owner: Bauer Radio

History
- First air date: 21 April 1996
- Former names: Spirit FM

Links
- Website: GHR West Sussex

Greatest Hits Radio West Sussex is an Independent Local Radio station owned and operated by Bauer as part of the Greatest Hits Radio Network. It broadcasts to West Sussex.

== History ==
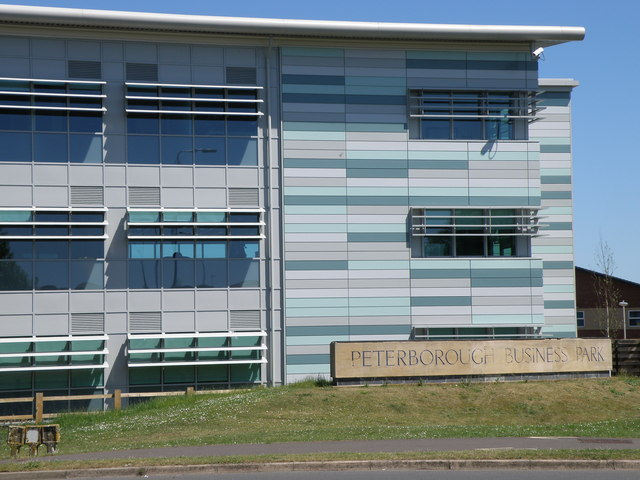
Entrance to Peterborough's business park at Lynch Wood, where Bauer Media's HQ is located.

Spirit FM began broadcasting in April 1996 as an independent radio station. Its original chairman was David Palmer. The founding MD was Steve Oates.

In June 2020, Bauer announced that the station "will be rebranded as "Greatest Hits Radio", offering classic hits from the '70s, '80s and '90s".

Spirit FM was awarded the licence to broadcast to West Sussex by the former Radio Authority, now Ofcom, in 1995 and was a radio station that was part of the UKRD Group In 2020, after being acquired by Bauer from UKRD, it become part of the national Greatest Hits Radio brand, while later in the year many of the ex-presenters of Spirit FM were hired by a new local DAB station called V2 Radio.

== Programming ==
Greatest Hits Radio is wholly owned by Bauer Radio and has a quasi-national programme format.
