= Tone FM =

Coordinates: 51°00′57″N 3°05′26″W

Taunton; England
- Broadcast area: Taunton, Taunton Deane, Wellington
- Frequency: 107.8 MHz
- Branding: Local Radio As It Should Be

Programming
- Language: English
- Format: Local & national news, talk and music

Ownership
- Owner: Tone Community Media Group CIC

History
- First air date: 28 February 2013
- Last air date: 4 March 2025

Technical information
- ERP: 50 watts

Links
- Website: Tone FM

Tone FM (styled ToneFM) was a community radio station based in Taunton, Somerset, broadcasting to Taunton and the surrounding area on 107.8 FM, 24 hours a day. It was granted a community radio licence by Ofcom in April 2012, with its first broadcast on Thursday 28 February 2013 presented by Darren Daley, who was the station's manager. Being a nonprofit organisation, Tone FM's presenters are all volunteers with guests sourced from the local community. The Tone FM studios were situated on the first floor of the historic Market House, in the centre of the County Town.

Tone FM took on new management in November 2021, with a new Community Interest Company being formed named 'Tone Community Media Group CIC' In 2022 the station was awarded a small-scale DAB multiplex by Ofcom, with a planned switch on date of April 2024.

As of 5 March 2025, broadcasting on FM and online channels ceased without any explanation from the station's management.
