= Deborah James (journalist) =

English journalist and podcast host (1981–2022)

Dame Deborah James DBE
- James receiving her damehood insignia in 2022
- Born: Deborah Anne James; 1 October 1981; Chertsey, Surrey, England
- Died: 28 June 2022 (aged 40); Woking, Surrey, England
- Cause of death: Bowel cancer
- Education: University of Exeter
- Occupations: Journalist; educator; podcaster; charity campaigner
- Years active: 2017–2022
- Known for: You, Me and the Big C
- Spouse: Sebastien Bowen (m. 2008)
- Children: 2
- Website: bowelbabe.org

Dame Deborah Anne James DBE (1 October 1981 – 28 June 2022) was an English journalist, educator, podcast host and charity campaigner from London. In 2016, she was diagnosed with incurable bowel cancer and went on to host the You, Me and the Big C podcast on BBC Radio 5 Live about her struggles with her illness.

== Personal life ==
Deborah Anne James was born in Chertsey, Surrey on 1 October 1981 to Heather and Alistair James. She attended The Winston Churchill School, Woking, later going on to study economics at the University of Exeter. Her mother was a gymnastics coach, and James trained at Woking Gymnastics Club. By the age of nine, she was training 30 hours a week. James married Sebastien Bowen in 2008; the couple had two children.

== Career, illness and death ==
James was a deputy head teacher specialising in computer science and e-learning at Salesian School, Chertsey, and later moving to the Matthew Arnold School in Staines-upon-Thames where she worked up until her diagnosis with bowel cancer. She began working as a journalist and columnist for The Sun, detailing her cancer journey. In March 2018, she began presenting the You, Me and the Big C podcast for BBC Radio 5, alongside fellow cancer patients Lauren Mahon and Rachael Bland, the latter of whom died in September 2018.

The Guardian described the podcast as unique for its "frankness, honesty and humour" and James as "its outrageous heart"; she was open about graphic details of her bowel cancer and once asked the Olympic swimmer Steve Parry whether he ejaculated twice or half as much after surviving testicular cancer. In October 2018, she released her book F*** You Cancer: How to Face the Big C, Live Your Life and Still Be Yourself.

In June 2021, after undergoing multiple treatments, James said her cancer was moving in "the wrong direction" and that the drugs she was relying on were no longer effective. In May 2022, James posted an update on her condition on social media, stating that she was receiving hospice-at-home care and that "her body just couldn't continue anymore". Less than 48 hours after her post, over £3 million was raised for her campaign, the Bowelbabe Fund. Two days later, James was appointed a Dame Commander of the Order of the British Empire (DBE) for services to charity and cancer awareness. She received her damehood from Prince William, Duke of Cambridge, at her parental home.

In her final days, James lived at her parents' house in Woking, Surrey, where she died on 28 June 2022, aged 40, from cancer.

At the time of her death, her fundraising website bowelbabe.org had accumulated nearly £7 million to fund "clinical trials and research into personalised medicine for cancer patients and supporting campaigns to raise awareness of bowel cancer". Her final message read: "find a life worth enjoying; take risks; love deeply; have no regrets; and always, always have rebellious hope. And finally, check your poo – it could just save your life."

Prime Minister Boris Johnson described her as "an absolute inspiration", and the Duke and Duchess of Cambridge said in a statement, "Deborah was an inspirational and unfalteringly brave woman whose legacy will live on."
