= Rachael Bland =

British journalist and presenter (1978–2018)

- Bland in a video for Stylist, 2018
- Born: Rachael Rebecca Hodges; 21 January 1978; Creigiau, Cardiff, Wales
- Died: 5 September 2018 (aged 40); Knutsford, Cheshire, England
- Cause of death: Breast cancer
- Education: University of Wales; University of Central Lancashire
- Occupations: Journalist and presenter
- Spouse: Steve Bland (m. 2013)
- Children: 1

Rachael Rebecca Bland (née Hodges; 21 January 1978 – 5 September 2018) was a British journalist and presenter from Cardiff, Wales. She worked for BBC Radio 5 Live, BBC World News and BBC North West Tonight. She was known for her podcast, You, Me and the Big C, which was broadcast while she was ill with breast cancer, and in which she discussed issues and treatment of the disease. In the final months of her life she wrote a memoir, For Freddie, which was published posthumously early the following year.

== Career ==
Bland was born in Creigiau, Cardiff. She started her career presenting news bulletins with the BBC Local Radio station BBC Wiltshire. She then moved to BBC Radio 5 Live, at first reading the news on Richard Bacon's show, where she became the straight talking foil to Bacon on The Special Half Hour Club.

Bland then started to present sports on television, as well as acting as a relief and weekend presenter on the BBC News Channel and BBC World News. When BBC Radio 5 Live moved to MediaCityUK, Salford Quays in 2011, Bland started to present on BBC North West Tonight as both a newsreader and as the main relief presenter.

== Personal life ==
In September 2013, she married BBC Radio 5 Live producer Steve Bland. They had a son together, Freddie. Bland competed as a triathlete, including the 2010 London Triathlon, raising funds for Breast Cancer Care. She completed the London Marathon several times.

== Illness ==
Bland was diagnosed with triple-negative breast cancer in November 2016. In the early stages of her condition, she continued to present Radio 5 Live, saying she would rather be known as "Rachael the news presenter" than "Rachael the cancer patient". She received criticism by Internet trolls who accused her of "not fighting cancer hard enough".

Following the diagnosis, Bland started presenting the BBC podcast You, Me and the Big C to raise awareness of cancer, discussing the disease with celebrities and providing advice of how to manage it. The podcast featured fellow cancer patients Deborah James and Lauren Mahon and became popular for its discussion of cancer, with medical experts regularly appearing on the programme. It featured the trio's self-deprecating humour to cope with their situation; when Bland announced she was unsure that she would survive to the end of the series, James retorted, "Shut up, Rachael, stop being so over-dramatic."

In early 2018, she participated in a clinical trial of experimental treatment at the Christie Hospital, Manchester, that she hoped would prevent or postpone the cancer. This was unsuccessful, and in May, she announced that her cancer had spread and was now incurable. She hoped that clinical treatment would still be available so she could live longer. She continued to blog and run You, Me and the Big C, and hoped that she could do enough to give her son memories of her life. Towards the end of her life, she announced she had written her memoirs, which she hoped would be published some day. In June, a crowdfunding site was set up in order to allow her to have a family holiday while she still could.

== Death and legacy ==
In August 2018, Bland announced that she had less than a year to live. On 3 September, she announced on her Twitter account that her "time had come", and that she only had days left. She died two days later at the age of 40 at her home in Knutsford, Cheshire surrounded by her family. You, Me and the Big C reached number one on the iTunes Podcast charts during this week. Family and colleagues paid her tribute including Dan Walker, Dame Kelly Holmes, former Chancellor of the Exchequer, George Osborne and Busted's Charlie Simpson. Health secretary Matt Hancock said, "Her legacy is a testament to how much more we need to do to beat this dreadful disease." Her co-hosts continued the You, Me and the Big C podcast. On 21 February 2019, her memoir For Freddie (which is dedicated to her son) was published.

On 28 June 2019 American rock band The Killers dedicated their song "A Dustland Fairytale" to Bland, while in concert at Cardiff Castle.
