= AIR 107.2 =

AIR 107.2 - Community Radio
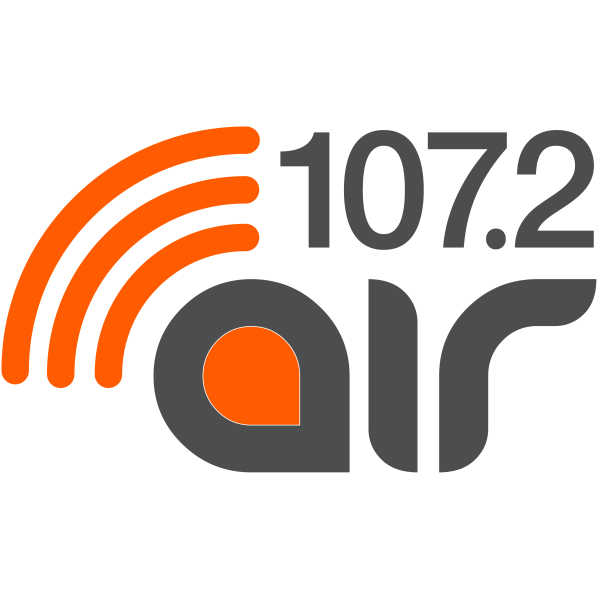
- England
- Broadcast area: Weymouth and Portland: FM; Worldwide: Internet
- Frequency: FM: 107.2

Programming
- Language: English
- Format: Contemporary Hit Radio

Ownership
- Owner: AIR FM Community Interest Company

History
- First air date: 11 May 2011

Links
- Webcast: Web Stream
- Website: www.air1072.com

AIR 107.2 is a community radio station in the Weymouth and Portland area of Dorset, England. The station broadcasts from its new (2025) transmitter site located on the Isle of Portland.

AIR (All Inclusive Radio) began streaming via its website on Wednesday 11 May 2011. In April 2012, The station was awarded FM Community Radio status by Ofcom. Transmitting power was increased from the initial 25 watts to 100 watts (100 HP, 100 VP) in February 2022 and is licensed to broadcast through May 2028.

The station’s mission is to serve and promote the region.

The day time programming content includes local news, information, along with a mix of new/recent music and gold/power oldies. Specialist music programmes are broadcast in the evenings. Air is focused on both the local community and visiting tourists, with special attention being given to the promotion of regional events, attractions and local artists.
