= You, Me and the Big C =

British podcast about life with cancer

- Genre: health and fitness podcast
- Country of origin: United Kingdom
- Language: English

Cast and voices
- Hosted by: Deborah James (2018–2022); Lauren Mahon (2018–2023); Rachael Bland (2018); Steve Bland (2018–2023); Various (2023–)

Publication
- No. of episodes: 103
- Original release: March 2018
- Updates: Monthly

Reception
- Ratings: 4.8/5

Related
- Website: bbc.co.uk/programmes/p0608649

You, Me and the Big C is a British podcast about life with, treatment of and other topics relating to the disease cancer. The podcast was originally hosted by three former or current cancer patients; Deborah James, Lauren Mahon and Rachael Bland. Since Bland's death from cancer in September 2018, the podcast had also been occasionally co-hosted by her widower Steve Bland. James died from cancer in June 2022, leaving Mahon as the only surviving original host.

In January 2023, it was announced that Bland and Mahon would be leaving the podcast. In September of the same year, the first Legacy Podcast was made available. Each episode is hosted by different people and covers various aspects of cancer.

== Contents ==
The podcast is designed to have a light-hearted feel to it. Former presenter Rachael Bland stated in an interview with The Guardian newspaper: "We wanted to create a space where you feel like you're sitting down with girls like you, having a cup of tea, talking about it like it's EastEnders."

== Reception ==
The podcast reached number one in the UK podcast charts on 4 September 2018, after Bland announced that she only had days to live.

In September 2018, it won Best Podcast at the Northern Blog Awards.

In October 2018, the podcast was awarded Best New Show at the Audio and Radio Industry Awards.

In March 2019, the podcast won Podcast of the Year at the TRIC (Television and Radio Industries Club) awards.

In 2022, it won Podcast Champion at the British Podcast Awards.
