= BBC Sounds =

BBC media streaming and download service

- Logo used since 2021
- Developer: BBC
- Release: 25 June 2018
- Written in: JavaScript, Scala, Swift, Kotlin
- Platform: Web, Amazon Echo, iOS, Android, Fire OS
- Available in: English, Welsh, Scottish Gaelic, Irish
- Type: Media player software
- Website: www.bbc.co.uk/sounds

BBC Sounds is a British over-the-top audio streaming and download service from the BBC that includes live radio broadcasts, audio on demand, and podcasts. The service is available on a wide range of devices, including mobile phones and tablets, personal computers, cars, and smart televisions.

As of 21 July 2025, BBC Sounds is only available for UK-based listeners and doesn't feature commercial advertising; international listeners can find BBC Radio 4 and World Service on the BBC.com website and app, along with podcasts. All other live radio stations (such as Radio 1, 6 Music, and others), excluding geo-restricted on-demand content, are also available on alternative radio sources internationally using TuneIn.

== Service ==
The BBC Sounds logo used from 2018 until 2021.

The BBC Sounds website replaced the iPlayer Radio service for UK users in October 2018. An initial beta version of the BBC Sounds app was launched in June 2018, with both the new app and the iPlayer Radio app supported until September 2019, when the iPlayer Radio app was finally decommissioned in the UK. Since 22 September 2020, BBC Sounds has been available to international users; it replaced BBC iPlayer Radio for international audiences at the end of October 2020. However, in February 2025, the BBC announced that international access to the World Service and Radio 4 was now available on the bbc.com website and the BBC app, and that international access to the BBC Sounds website and app would be removed later that Spring. The plan received backlash by its listeners, both from listeners of the radio stations abroad as well as listeners from the Republic of Ireland, with one listener claiming that it could potentially violate the Good Friday Agreement. On 18 April 2025, the BBC announced that it has postponed the changes while it worked on a plan to make its other radio stations, including its music radio stations (such as Radios 1, 2, and 3) and its regional and local stations, to be available outside of BBC Sounds, although the BBC will "prioritise countries where demand for the BBC's audio services is highest". The BBC later shut down international service for non-U.K. listeners on 21 July 2025, although access to radio stations remained available, but with live radio only.

An app for Connected TVs (including Amazon Fire TV) was released in March 2020. An Apple tvOS app is also in development. BBC Sounds differs from iPlayer Radio by acting as a place for original podcast material created by the BBC specifically for the app in addition to live and catch-up listening of its linear radio services. One example of this is the Beyond Today podcast, a daily online-only 17 minute podcast produced by the Today team, exploring an issue in-depth with a younger audience in mind.

The BBC has also announced plans to make podcasts from third-party producers available within the BBC Sounds service.

At launch the BBC Sounds service caused controversy amongst some users of the former iPlayer Radio app, who claimed that the functionality did not have the same features as before, objected to the login requirements, and raised concerns that the new app was no longer supported on older versions of smartphones. Some broadsheet newspapers have claimed that these changes disproportionately affect older listeners, particularly those who listen to speech and comedy content on BBC Radio 4.

== Development ==
An early web prototype led by BBC employee Jason Williams surfaced in 2014 called BBC Radio Explorer. The web app allowed users to listen to different content across the BBC including podcasts, shows, clips within the same UI. Later on the full development of Sounds began from the same team.

BBC Sounds on the web was built from the ground up with Node.js, React, Redux, and Express.js. The mobile applications were written in Swift for iOS, and in Kotlin for Android. The apps were released on 26 June 2018, before the website had any 'Sounds' branding, in order to gain early feedback.

App features include the ability to look up station schedules, download and share media, rewind live radio, and listen in-car via either Android Auto or Apple CarPlay.

Both the website and the apps are served with data from a single set of APIs called Radio and Music Services, or RMS, microservices built in the Scala programming language. This single source of data replaces a large number of different services that powered earlier incarnations of the radio products.

== See also ==
- U
- BBC Select (streaming service)
- BBC iPlayer
- BBC Radio Explorer
- BBC Player (for Singapore and Malaysia only)
- BBC Three (streaming service)
- BritBox
