= V2 Radio =

Commercial radio station in England

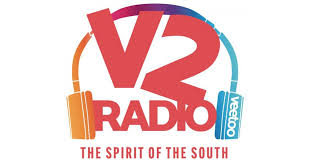
- England
- Broadcast area: Sussex and South Hampshire
- Frequencies: DAB: 10B Sussex and 11C South Hampshire

Programming
- Format: Adult Contemporary

Ownership
- Owner: VeeToo Trade

History
- First air date: Monday 18 January 2021

Technical information
- Transmitter coordinates: 50°49′28″N 0°43′57″W

Links
- Website: www.v2radio.co.uk

V2 Radio is an Independent Local Radio station owned and operated by VeeToo Trade in the United Kingdom. It broadcasts to West Sussex and South Hampshire, England.

== History ==
In May 2020 after Bauer Media announced that Spirit FM "will be rebranded as "Greatest Hits Radio", offering classic hits from the '70s, '80s and '90s",Justin Cottrell met with a group of presenters from Spirit FM and grouped together with VeeToo trade to form V2 Radio.

The station started with test transmissions in December 2020 using a Restricted Service Licence (RSL) to serve the Chichester, Bognor Regis and surrounding areas on 87.7 FM from December 1st to the 28th 2020 before its official launch on 18 January 2021.

== Programming ==
V2 Radio broadcasts locally from its studios in West Sussex, 24 hours a day and 7 days a week. In April 2024 it expanded its DAB coverage to also broadcast to South Hampshire following the rebranding of Wave 105 to Greatest Hits Radio.

Highlights include the breakfast show with Tanya McCarthy from 6am to 10am and Drive Time with Ian Crouch from 3pm to 7pm.
