= Black Country Radio =

Coordinates: 52°29′11″N 2°06′50″W

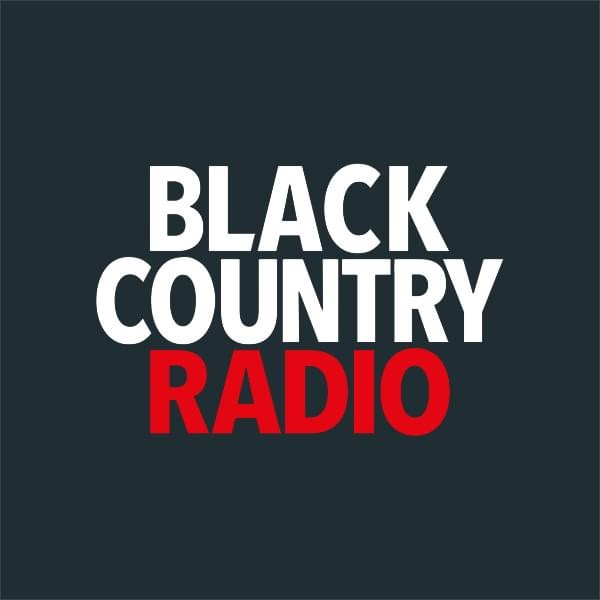
- England
- Broadcast area: Black Country and Birmingham
- Frequencies: 92.2 MHz (Dudley); 102.5 MHz (Stourbridge), DAB: 8A (Dudley & Stourbridge); 9A (North Birmingham); 9B (Walsall)

Programming
- Language: English
- Format: Hot AC

Ownership
- Owner: Waterfront Media CIC

History
- First air date: 1 January 2008
- Former names: 102.5 The Bridge

Links
- Webcast: Listen Live
- Website: blackcountryradio.co.uk

Black Country Radio is a local radio station based in the West Midlands region of England, owned and operated by Waterfront Media CIC. It operates under a community radio license and broadcasts to the Black Country and Birmingham on FM, DAB and online.

== History ==
Black Country Radio began life as two separate stations. 102.5 The 'Bridge started broadcasting on FM from studios in Stourbridge on 1 January 2008, targeting a 25 - 55 year old audience with an emphasis on local news, sport, events and good causes. In 2015, they merged with Black Country Community Radio, an online station operating nearby, to produce Black Country Radio. This meant they could combine resources to secure the long-term future of both stations.

Black Country Radio also extended its coverage area and began broadcasting on DAB as part of the Birmingham 'MiniMux', which is an effort by the regulator to make technology more available to smaller stations operating on a much lower annual income.

In September 2016, the station was temporarily taken off the air after thieves broke into the studios and stole vital broadcasting equipment. The burglary was featured on the BBC television programme, Caught Red Handed in 2017.

In December 2016, Black Country Radio began broadcasting from new studios at the Waterfront complex in Brierley Hill. The move into purpose-built premises providing the station with two on-air studios, dedicated recording suites and a live music area. During 2020, the station moved premises again to a space in the new Resonance Music College development in the town. This gave them four state of the art, fully digital studios, video streaming capability and a separate broadcast stream to help to train students in media practice.

In 2021 a new sister station, Black Country Xtra, was created which allows community groups to have additional on air presence in addition to what is already broadcast on the main station. These groups are trained in basic studio operation and then allowed to formulate and maintain their own shows. Current content includes men's mental health programming, local amateur dramatics, local history, support groups such as Samaritans and Alcoholics Anonymous and shows dedicated to local town centres.

== Programming ==
All programming on Black Country Radio is produced locally, with the exception of some late night weekend content which is syndicated. During peak times, the station plays a mix of music from the 80s to the present day and also broadcasts over a dozen specialist shows including Jazz, Classical, Motown and Rock. There's also an emphasis on promoting local music, with many bands and singers having performed live on air as well as at roadshows, outside broadcasts and concerts.

National news is broadcast on the hour, every hour with local news and sport bulletins broadcast from 7am to 7pm on weekdays.

The station also regularly hosts overnight coverage for both local and general elections, with interviews and analysis from prominent local and national political figures.

Black Country Radio also broadcast regular sports coverage for local and national teams, including Stourbridge FC, Halesowen Town FC and Dudley Kingswinford Rugby Club. The shows also have a strong interest in women's leagues, which might not receive as much coverage otherwise.

== Community events and outside broadcasts ==
Black Country Radio regularly appears at events across the region, in conjunction with Dudley Council, Halesowen Business Improvement District and local businesses, charities and community groups.

The station has hosted live coverage of major events including the Birmingham St Patricks Day celebrations and Birmingham Pride, interviewing artists including Louisa Johnson and Dua Lipa.

They also host Christmas light switch on events including celebrations in Dudley, Stourbridge and Halesowen town centres. This has seen them work alongside celebrities and personalities including Britain's Got Talent finalist, Connie Talbot; Paralympic Grand Slam winner, Jordanne Whiley; TV presenter, Alison Hammond and singer and actress, Beverley Knight. The station are a permanent part of the Black Country Festival.

As part of its commitment to the local area, Black Country Radio also covers a number of live events in the region, including Remembrance services and the Dudley Volunteer Awards which celebrates the work of volunteers in the area. The awards is organised by Dudley Council for Voluntary Services, who also worked with the station in 2019 to coordinate their 'Operation Santa' appeal to ensure every child in the Black Country receives a present from Santa.

In 2020, the station along with Dudley MBC, hosted the first virtual Christmas light switch on from their studios in Brierley Hill.

During the COVID-19 pandemic, the station created an award-winning community hotline service which helped over 500 vulnerable people seek help and support with things like medication, shopping and friendship.

== Presenters ==
The current on air team are a mixture of new local talent and staff who have previously worked on Commercial, Hospital, Student and BBC stations.

Notable names include:

Current:

- Dan Richards (Smooth Radio, BBC Radio WM and BBC Radio Leicester)
- Matt Dudley (BBC Radio WM, Sandwell Hospital Radio)
- Nigel Ball (BRMB, Heart FM)
- Steve Welch (107.7 The Wolf)
- Simon Wilson (Halesowen College Radio)

Previous:

- Amelia Cox (Sky News Radio, Global, NewsUK)
- Ben Stones (BBC Radio 2)
- Carl Bennett (TalkRADIO and GB News)
- Danni G (Signal 107 and BFBS)
- David Wooldridge (UKRD Group)
- Henry Liston (BBC Radio WM)
- Jonny Cole (Hits Radio)
- Liam McConkey (ITN, ITV News)
- Sally Johnson (BBC CWR, BBC Radio 2)

Contribution from:

- Dave Pearce (BBC Radio 1 and BBC Radio 2)
- Judge Jules (BBC Radio 1)

== Awards and recognition ==
Over the years, the station has won a number of awards at varying levels. Most notably the Queens Award for Voluntary Service for their work during the COVID-19 pandemic.

They've also won a gold award at the Community Radio Awards for providing a full church service to listeners who were unable to attend in person during the pandemic and other awards at the ceremony for their sports coverage.

== See also ==
- Community radio in the United Kingdom
