= BBC Weather =

BBC's department in charge of broadcasting weather forecasts

- Logo used since 2022
- Type: BBC department
- Industry: Broadcasting
- Headquarters: Broadcasting House, London, United Kingdom
- Area served: United Kingdom; Rest of the world
- Owner: BBC
- Website: www.bbc.co.uk/weather

BBC Weather is the department of the BBC (British Broadcasting Corporation) responsible for both the preparation and the broadcasting of weather forecasts.

On 6 February 2018, BBC Weather changed supplier from the government Met Office to MeteoGroup after an open competition. The Met Office had been the provider of weather information for 94 years. In July 2025, the BBC announced that it would be partnering with the Met Office again in future, instead of MeteoGroup.

== History ==
George Cowling presented the first in-vision forecast on 11 January 1954.

The first BBC weather forecast was a shipping forecast, broadcast on the radio on behalf of the Met Office on 14 November 1922, and the first daily weather forecast was broadcast on 26 March 1923.

In 1936, the BBC experimented with the world's first televised weather maps, brought into practice in 1949 after World War II. The map filled the entire screen, with an off-screen announcer reading the next day's weather.

=== Advancement of technology ===
On 11 January 1954, the first in-vision weather forecast was broadcast, presented by George Cowling. In an in-vision forecast, the narrator stands in front of the map. At that point, the maps were drawn by hand in the London Weather Centre, before being couriered across London. The forecasts were presented by the same person who had composed them, and had relatively low accuracy. The London Weather Centre which opened in 1959 took the responsibility for the national radio weather broadcasts. Radio forecasters were chosen by a BBC audition from the forecasters at the London Weather Centre.

In 1962, the installation of a fax machine and an electronic computer in the Met Office led to more accurate and quicker forecasting.

Satellite photography was available from 1964, but was of a poor quality and was given on paper, with the coastline etched in felt-tip pen. This did not change until 1973 with the installation of a new computer, increasing processing power of the Weather Centre greatly, leading to forecasts twice as accurate as earlier ones.

=== Graphical technology ===
Michael Fish presents a weather forecast in 1974.

As computational capability improved, so did graphics technology. Early hand-drawn maps gave way to magnetic symbols, which in turn gave way to bluescreen (CSO) computer-generated imagery technology, each of which allowed the presenter greater control over the information displayed.

Early magnetic symbols tended to adhere poorly to the maps, and occasional spelling errors (such as the presenter writing 'GOF' instead of 'FOG') marred some broadcasts, but allowed the presenter to show how weather would change over time. The symbols were designed to be 'self-explicit', allowing the viewer to understand the map without a key or legend.

On 18 February 1985, computer graphics were introduced although the basic design of symbols was kept the same. These forecasts were widely acclaimed for their simplicity, winning an award from the Royal Television Society in 1993.

On 2 October 2000, BBC Weather underwent a more significant change. Whilst there was not much change to the existing weather symbols, new symbols giving information on pollen and sun levels were introduced. A new more detailed map of Britain was used based on satellite data.

=== Great Storm of 1987 controversy ===
Possibly the most famous of the forecasters is the now retired Michael Fish. Known for his informal manner and eccentric dress sense (he once wore a blue and green blazer emblazoned with all the weather symbols), he made a comment before the Great Storm of 1987.

During a weather forecast some hours before the storm, Michael Fish started his forecast with the now infamous line "Earlier on today, apparently, a woman rang the BBC and said she heard there was a hurricane on the way. Well, if you're watching, don't worry, there isn't". In this he was factually correct, as it is unlikely for a proper hurricane to reach the UK latitudes, and he was actually referring to a Florida hurricane (Floyd). He then went on to accurately forecast stormy conditions over the south of England. However, the statement has gone down in popular culture as one of the worst mistakes made so publicly.

=== Weatherscape XT Graphics (2005–2018) ===
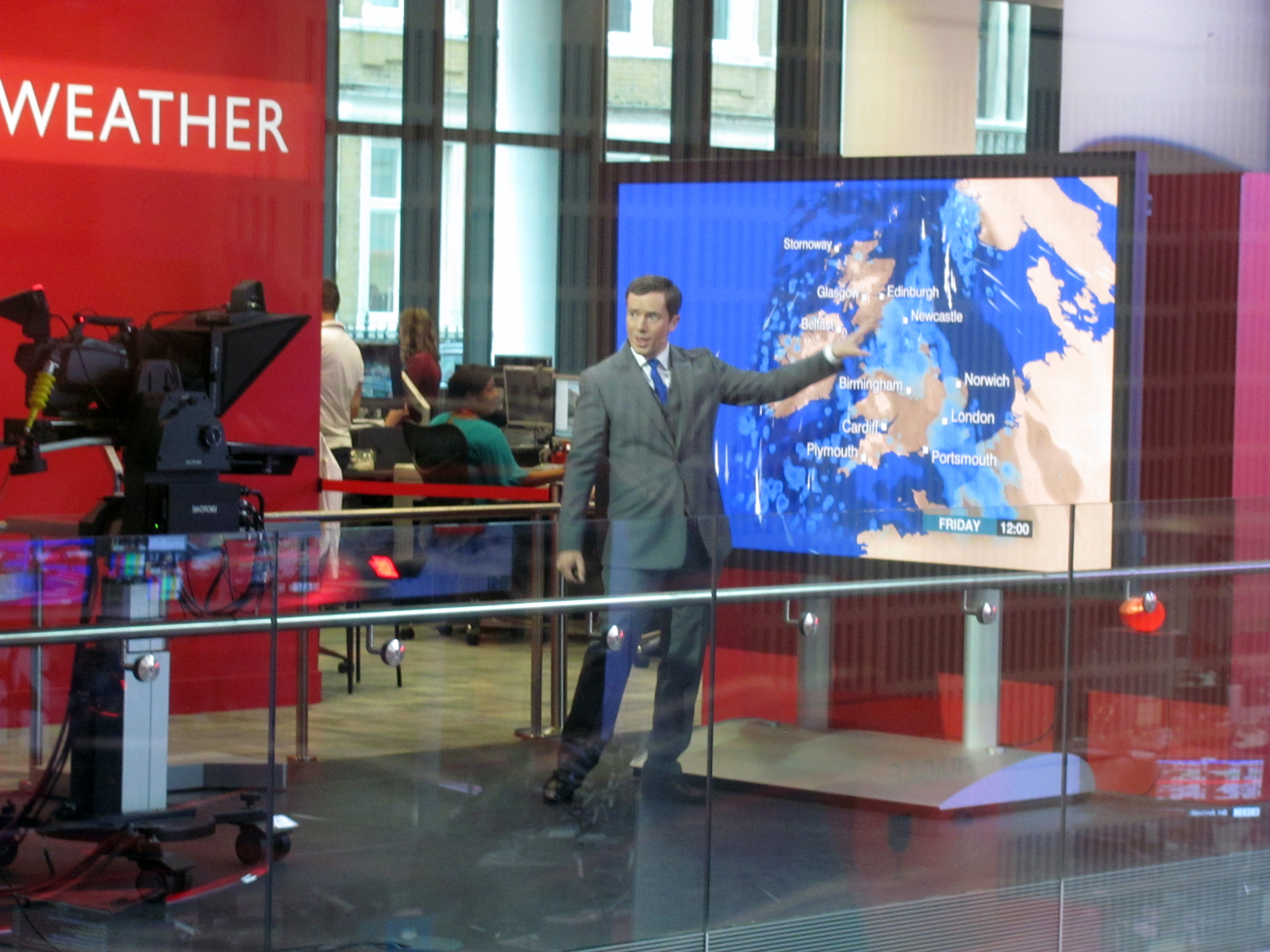
Alex Deakin presents a 2013 weather forecast from New Broadcasting House

The weather symbols were replaced in May 2005 after 29 years and 9 months on air by a controversial format as the forecast underwent another redesign, with the flat map replaced by a 3D globe, and weather conditions shown by coloured areas. Cloud cover is indicated by the brightness of the map, while rain and snow are indicated by animated blue and white areas respectively. The graphics are provided by Weatherscape XT, which was developed by the commercial arm of the New Zealand Metservice.

The move polarised opinion; some saw it as more accurate and modern, while others disliked the brown colour chosen for the landmass and the presumed high cost of the graphics. The angling of the map, in order to show the curvature of the Earth, led to Scotland appearing little larger than Devon, and Shetland being almost invisible while exaggerating London and the South East. This led to many Scottish commentators accusing the BBC of having a London bias. As a result, the map was realigned, and the moving tour of the UK was lengthened.

The new look won a Silver Award at the Promax/BDA Awards in 2006. Criticism continued, however, with some viewers complaining about the colour scheme, and of a lack of detail in the forecast about weather developments beyond 36 hours. In 2006, a rippling effect was introduced to define seas and oceans.

=== BBC Weather Service switch to MeteoGroup ===
Former logo, used from 2019 to 2023

On 23 August 2015, the BBC announced that the Met Office would lose its contract to provide weather forecasts, the BBC stating that it is legally obliged to ensure that licence fee payers get the best value for money. The BBC said that the on-air presenting team was not expected to change and it would still broadcast warnings from the Met Office National Severe Weather Warning Service and Shipping Forecast issued on behalf of the Maritime and Coastguard Agency.

A competitive tendering process followed, with MeteoGroup (now part of DTN) chosen as the new provider in August 2016. Data for forecasts began to be provided by MeteoGroup in February 2018.

On 6 February 2018, the BBC began using the MeteoGroup graphics, which include:

- a seasonal "window on the weather" at the start of each bulletin
- green land
- high quality moving graphics reproduce detailed weather conditions represented by high-resolution data
- more "realistic mapping"
- a "realistic globe" to display a "variety of data from falling snow particles to areas likely to see the aurora"
- forecasts that offer "improved accessibility for users with colour-blindness"
- the possibility to "customise both TV and online forecasts, zooming in on particular areas to provide a more detailed forecast"
- a 'chance of precipitation' feature on the app
- a 'feels like' factor, for the app, that determines how cold it feels outside, particularly in different wind conditions
- up to a 7-day forecast on TV and radio
- up to 14 days of hourly forecasts for more UK and international locations—online and on the app

Public feedback in January 2018 regarding the subsequent updates and changes to the BBC Website and associated weather applications for mobile devices were generally critical. Many weather watchers were highly critical of the new design, with widespread criticism voiced across the media. Many used the comments section of the blog written by Michael Burnett, the BBC Executive responsible, to voice their complaints. The blog entry dated 22 January 2018 was originally aimed at positively promoting the changes, but this appeared to have the opposite effect when the blog post generated well over 1000 mostly critical comments in under 10 days.

=== BBC Weather 'partnership' Met Office ===
On 30 July 2025, the BBC announced that it would be partnering with the Met Office in future, instead of DTN. It was reported that the partnership was not a commercial one, instead "an agreement between the two organisations in the interests of public service".

The BBC said that the new partnership is aimed at delivering "the most trusted and accurate weather service to everyone in the UK".

Director-General of the BBC, Tim Davie, said that the weather is "the UK's favourite conversation...hugely important to all our lives and all our audiences across the world." "The BBC's world-renowned journalism will be working together with the Met Office's weather and climate intelligence to turn science into stories and help everyone in the UK to make informed decisions about the weather.

"There has never been more need for trusted and impartial information to help people understand today's weather."

In 2026, BBC Weather began operating a daily weather channel on BBC iPlayer, showing live conditions across the UK between sunrise and sunset.

== National forecasters ==
National forecasters still provide forecasts for local news programmes.

=== Current ===
- Darren Bett
- Stav Danaos
- Chris Fawkes
- Alina Jenkins
- Sarah Keith-Lucas
- Simon King
- Louise Lear
- Susan Powell
- Ben Rich
- Elizabeth Rizzini
- Tomasz Schafernaker
- Matt Taylor
- Helen Willetts

=== Former ===
- Jack Armstrong
- Philip Avery
- Jim Bacon
- Bill Bruce
- Suzanne Charlton
- T. H. Clifton
- Peter Cockroft
- Daniel Corbett
- George Cowling
- Bernard Davey
- Alex Deakin
- Liam Dutton
- Richard Edgar
- Barbara Edwards
- Michael Fish
- Bert Foord
- Everton Fox
- Peter Gibbs
- Bill Giles
- John Hammond
- Carol Kirkwood
- John Kettley
- Tori Lacey
- David Braine
- David Lee
- Lucy Martin
- Kirsty McCabe
- Ian McCaskill
- Rob McElwee
- Nick Miller
- Graham Parker
- Anne Purvis
- Nina Ridge
- Elizabeth Saary
- Jack Scott
- Laura Tobin
- Penny Tranter
- Sarah Wilmshurst
- Francis Wilson
- Owain Wyn Evans
- Jay Wynne
- Helen Young

== Online forecasts ==
The BBC Weather website provides outlook weather forecasts for UK and international locations using animated symbols and a format similar in design to that used for the televised broadcasts. The website launched in 1997.

The website also runs frequent special features about seasonal sports, white Christmas, nature, and meteorological science. It also has world weather, UK outlook, and weather news.

In October 2024 a technical fault affecting the supplying of data from DTN caused the BBC Weather website and app to incorrectly forecast wind speeds of over 15,000 mph (24,000 km/h) and air temperatures exceeding 400 °C (750 °F).

== BBC Weather apps ==
On 20 May 2013, the BBC released the BBC Weather App for both iOS devices (although initially not optimised for iPad) and Android devices (via the Google Play Store). Both versions were designed by Media Applications Technologies, and their data source was the Met Office.

== See also ==
- National, regional, and retired BBC weather forecasters
