= John Kettley =

British weather forecaster (born 1952)

John Graham Kettley (born 11 July 1952 in Halifax, West Yorkshire) is a British freelance weather forecaster.

== Early life ==
Kettley's father, Harold, lived at 75 Hollins Road in Walsden, the son of Fred Kettley, and was a trumpet player in brass bands, playing with the band of the 10th Battalion Royal Army Ordnance Corps. Kettley's mother was Marion Greenwood; she gave birth to Kettley at Halifax General Hospital, and they lived at 35 Commercial Street.

He was educated at Todmorden Grammar School, gaining English Language, Art, Maths, Physics, and Chemistry O-levels in 1968. A geography teacher at his school sparked his interest in weather forecasting. He started Geography A-level, but never took the exam. In 1970, he gained A-levels in Maths and Physics.

His sister Susan was born on 6 June 1955 and went to the grammar school, where she threw the discus, acquiring 3 O-levels.

He played cricket for Burnley and Todmorden. By 1967, he played cricket for the local second XI team, mainly as a bowler.

He worked at the meteorological office at Manchester Airport for two years from 1970 before studying applied health and social care at what is now Coventry University, where he met his wife. He spent four years researching meteorology. He trained for a year in weather presentation at the Met Office College, Shinfield, near Reading.

His parents later moved to Smithy Bridge.

== Career ==
From 1980, he worked at the Nottingham Weather Centre, presenting his first forecast for Radio Lincolnshire, then further forecasts for the BBC's Midlands Today (in the Nottingham news opt-out, starting 28 May 1980) and Central Television. In 1985, he became a national forecaster on the BBC. On Thursday 18 April 1991 he launched the first international weather forecast on the new BBC World Service Television.

=== Radio ===
Kettley used to work for the Met Office, and has previously presented weather for BBC Radio Five Live. Since October 2019, he has presented the weather forecasts during weekday breakfast on national rolling news radio station LBC News. On Tuesday 1 December 1998, he appeared on Radio Shuttleworth on Radio 4. He is now frequently heard presenting the weather forecasts on Boom Radio.

=== Travel programmes ===
He was a presenter on The Travel Show programme, from Thursday 18 June 1987, with Penny Junor, John Thirlwell and Matthew Collins. In May 1997, Kettley presented the Out and About walking programme.

=== Commercial weather forecasting ===
In 2000, Kettley left the Met Office to join commercial weather company British Weather Services, and continues to provide forecasts across a range of media outlets and sporting concerns including the Football Association, Twickenham and racecourses such as Newbury, Cheltenham, Haydock Park and Newmarket

== Personal life ==
Kettley enjoys playing cricket, fell-walking and horse racing. A supporter of Burnley F.C., he often makes references to the team's performances during broadcasts. He married Lynn in September 1990 in North Lincolnshire. His parents lived in Littleborough. He lived in Brinsley, when at Nottingham.

In 1988 he played cricket (as a bowler) for Ardeley in East Hertfordshire, where he lived.

He married graphic designer Lynn Grundy at St Andrew's church in Kirton in Lindsey on 12 September 1990, with the service given by Rev Ian Walker. Kettley had known Grundy at his polytechnic, although she went later to the University of Leicester, and designed Ladybird Books in the mid-1980s.

== Immortalised in verse ==
Kettley's status was confirmed in 1988, when a band called A Tribe of Toffs released the song "John Kettley Is a Weatherman", which also made reference to other TV weather presenters of the day, including Michael Fish, Bernard Davey, Bill Giles, Ian McCaskill and Wincey Willis. The single reached number 21 in the UK Singles Chart. The song included the chorus:

John Kettley is a weatherman
A weatherman, a weatherman
John Kettley is a weatherman
And so is Michael Fish
And so is Billy Giles
And so is Ian McCaskill
And so is Wincey Willis

== Publications ==
- Rain Stopped Play: The Geography of Cricket (co-author) ISBN 0-7146-5173-7 April 2002
- Weatherman ISBN 978-1-905080-61-8 September 2009
