= John Kettley Is a Weatherman =

Single by A Tribe of Toffs
- Released: 1988
- Genre: Novelty, jangle pop
- Length: 3:11
- Songwriter(s): Stephen Cousins, Andrew Stephenson and Phil Rodgers

"John Kettley Is a Weatherman" is a 1988 novelty record by the band A Tribe of Toffs, from Sunderland, UK. The song peaked at 21 in the UK Singles Chart.

The John Kettley referred to in the title is a British weatherman, who at the time presented national forecasts on BBC Television and BBC Radio.

The track was played on BBC Children's TV after being discovered by researcher Jane Louise who, on picking the single at random from the post bag commented that the "kids would love this one".

On 19 July 2022, the hottest day recorded in the UK, Radio X DJ Chris Moyles played the song after a clip of John Kettley discussing the weather featured in the 7am news, and Moyles subsequently "campaigned" for his listeners to buy it and it reached number 1 in the UK iTunes chart.

== People name-checked in the song ==
TV weather forecasters:

- John Kettley
- Michael Fish
- Bill Giles
- Ian McCaskill
- Wincey Willis
- Bernard Davey

Other individuals:

- Ayrton Senna, racing driver
- Peter Snow, TV presenter and journalist
- Mark Barano, according to the band this was a misspelling of Mark Bavano, an American NFL player.
- Simon Parkin, TV and radio presenter
- Eric Lane, American football player
- Jonathan Ross, TV presenter
- Lester Piggott, jockey
- David Icke, TV sports presenter
- Richard Keys, TV sports presenter
- Debbie Thrower, TV presenter
- Johnny Marr, guitarist with The Smiths
- David Steel, Liberal Democrat politician or more likely David Steele, Northamptonshire and England cricketer
- Chuck Knox, American football coach
- Andy Crane, children's TV presenter
