= Iteris =

American company based in Austin, Texas

Iteris Inc.
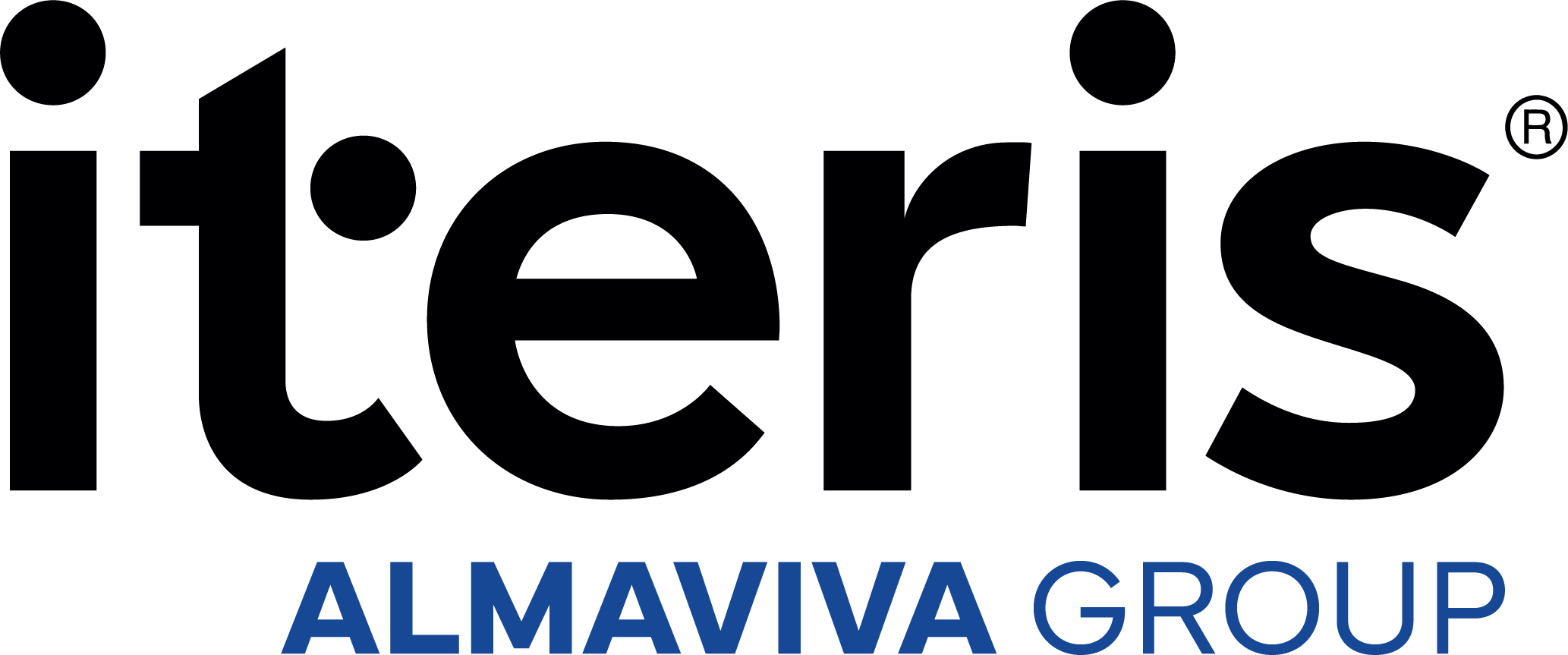
- Type: Public
- Industry: Transportation; mobility
- Predecessors: Odetics Inc. (1969–2003); Iteris Holdings (2003–2004)
- Founded: 2004; 22 years ago
- Headquarters: 1250 S Capital of Texas Highway, Austin, Texas, United States
- Key people: Joe Bergera (president and CEO); Kerry Shiba (CFO)
- Products: Software as a service; video detection sensors; radar detection sensors; hybrid detection sensors; Bluetooth detection sensors
- Services: Traffic signal coordination; data analysis; engineering; intelligent transportation systems; commercial vehicle operations; connected vehicle enablement; automated vehicle enablement; Advanced traveller information systems; transportation planning; Vehicle-to-everything (V2X) communications
- Revenue: $156.1 million (2023)
- Owner: Almaviva Group; (2024–present)
- Website: iteris.com

Iteris Inc. is an American company based in Austin, Texas that provides software, hardware and services for smart mobility infrastructure management, including software as a service, cloud-enabled managed services, consulting and advisory services, and sensors and other devices that record and predict traffic conditions.

Iteris Inc. was established in 2004. The company from which it was formed, Odetics Inc., was originally founded in 1969, in Anaheim, California and incorporated in Delaware in 1987. Joe Bergera has served as the company's president and chief executive officer since 2015, and Iteris reported revenue of $156.1 million in fiscal year 2023, ending March 31.

In November 2024, it was announced that Iteris had been acquired by Almaviva Group.

== History ==
The company from which Iteris Inc. was formed, Odetics Inc., was originally founded in 1969, in Anaheim, California, and incorporated in Delaware in 1987. It served as a business incubator for technology companies, and provided digital tape recorders to aerospace manufacturers. Odetics received an initial public offering in 1989. The company became known as simply Iteris in October 2004, through reverse merger.

The company acquired Meridian Environmental Technology Inc. (MET), which developed technologies related to traveler information and meteorology, during 2010–2011. Meridian continued to operate as a wholly owned subsidiary.

In 2011, Iteris acquired Berkeley Transportation Systems (BTS), a Northern California-based privately held company that analyzes transport networks and their effectiveness.

In July 2019, Iteris acquired Albeck Gerken, Inc., a privately held traffic operations engineering services provider headquartered in Tampa, Florida. Iteris was reportedly earning $68 million in annual revenue in 2015, and was added to the Russell 2000 Index on June 26, 2017. In May 2020, the company sold its agriculture and weather analytics business segment to DTN, an operating company of TBG AG. In mid 2023, Iteris reported revenue of $156.1 million for the previous fiscal year, ending March 31.

In December 2020, Iteris acquired TrafficCast International, Inc., a privately held, Wisconsin-based company that provides travel information services to commercial and public-sector providers.

=== Leadership ===
Joe Bergera has served as the company's president and chief executive officer (CEO) since 2015. Former CEOs include Jack Johnson, who served until 2007, and Abbas Mohaddes, who served from 2007 to 2015. Kevin Daly served as interim CEO between Mohaddes and Bergera, and maintained his longtime board position following the latter's hiring.

== Products and services ==
Iteris provides hardware, software, and consulting services for smart mobility infrastructure management. Specific products include ClearGuide (software as a service for transportation analytics), VantageCare (a cloud-enabled managed service), and ClearMobility Cloud (an open-architecture cloud framework that facilitates access to Iteris’s other hardware and software). The company also produces sensors and other devices that record and predict traffic conditions, using proprietary data analysis software.

=== Traffic and transportation ===
According to Business Insider, Iteris is the "leading provider of outdoor vision systems and sensors that optimize the flow of traffic and enhance driver safety". The company uses digital image processing, information technology, and traffic engineering to provide safety and transportation solutions.

In 2000, the Virginia Department of Transportation (VDOT) implemented an advanced traveller information system developed as part of a public–private partnership between the agency and Iteris. The system was among the first in the United States to collect data by reading motorists' wireless signals. Iteris designed a crash avoidance system in 2000 to warn Mercedes-Benz Actros drivers if trucks drifted outside their lane without using a turn signal. The lane departure warning system was available on approximately 8,000 trucks in Europe and the United States by 2004, and offered on two cars, the 2005 Infiniti FX crossover and the 2006 Infiniti M. In 2004, Iteris and Valeo were reportedly collaborating on a camera-based vision system for heavy duty trucks using active pixel sensors and integrated signal processing.

In 2009, the Southern California Association of Governments hired Iteris to survey trucking companies about possible Interstate 710 usage; the company's senior vice president was selected by Bill Bogaard to serve on a working group in 2014 to study the freeway's expansion. Iteris and Traffic Products worked to replace video surveillance systems on traffic lights in Murrysville, Pennsylvania, along U.S. Route 22, in 2010. VDOT hired Iteris again in 2011 to improve the state's 5-1-1 system over five years. The company began developing engineering and planning guidelines for the Abu Dhabi Department of Transport in 2011. Iteris partnered with TrafQuest again, having previously collaborated on an intelligent transportation system action plan for the department. In late 2013, the National Highway Institute chose Iteris to create and maintain a five-year training program for use by local, state, and federal highway and transportation agencies. The nearly $18 million contract was funded by the Federal Highway Administration, a division of the USDOT.

The city of San Diego purchased Iteris equipment in 2014 as part of a pilot program to count bicyclists and influence signal lengths displayed by traffic lights. The cameras were not installed along Harbor Drive until 2016, and engineers had to assess the system's accuracy and address inconsistencies by comparing automatically generated counts with actual video footage. In Texas, the company's vehicle detection system has directed the merging of traffic. Iteris analyzed technical data for the Santa Clara Valley Transportation Authority in 2015 to determine if removing two bus lanes would impact traffic on El Camino Real between Palo Alto and San Jose. The company was developing vehicle-to-traffic-infrastructure technology, as of mid 2015, to facilitate communication between vehicles and traffic signals.

The Oregon Department of Transportation used Iteris Freeway Performance Measurement software in Central Oregon to use mobile phone data to monitor and predict traffic problems associated with the solar eclipse of August 21, 2017. In May, the Louisiana Department of Transportation and Development signed a $2 million contract with Arcadis, Iteris, and Alliance Transportation Group to help prepare the state for vehicular automation. Iteris evaluated the necessity to keep nearly a dozen traffic signals in Columbus, Nebraska, in 2017.

The cities of Bentonville, Arkansas, and Gainesville, Florida, have used Iteris' VantageLive! traffic data collection software to capture traffic, pedestrian and bicycle counts at major intersections. The South Carolina Department of Transportation uses the company's ClearGuide mobility intelligence software as a service to reduce traffic congestion and delays, and to manage evacuation traffic during and after severe weather.

The state of Minnesota uses Iteris’ cloud framework to integrate its Intelligent Roadway Information System with ClearGuide, Iteris’ transportation analytics software as a service.

Through its acquisition of TrafficCast, Iteris provides commercial entities like SiriusXM and iHeart Media's Total Traffic & Weather Network with travel and traffic information. In 2020 TrafficCast provided traffic data about COVID testing sites in the US via in-car systems.

=== Agriculture and weather ===
Prior to its sale of its agriculture and weather analytics business segment to DTN in May 2020, Iteris offered products specifically for agriculture, including the ClearAg system, which used weather simulation to recommend harvest times based on predicted atmosphere and soil conditions, as well as crop moisture amounts. The platform also helped growers determine the best times to plant, fertilize, and treat crops, delivering advice via application programming interfaces (APIs) and apps. In April 2015, the company received a patent for the system, which was used to track storms as a form of crop protection for BASF. As of 2016, Iteris was the only company using land surface models for climate and weather prediction as a tool for farmers to use to improve agriculture practices.

== Recognition ==
In 2014, Iteris earned a transportation planning award from the American Planning Association for offering recommendations and "appropriate technology for efficient mobility" to the Long Beach general plan. The company and Delcan Technologies were recognized for their contributions to MDOT's Automated Vehicle Location and Maintenance Decision Support System Program, which earned a "Best of ITS" award in the "Best New Innovative Practice in the Sustainability in Transportation" category from ITS America.
