= The Progressive Farmer =

Agricultural magazine

DTN/The Progressive Farmer
- Frequency: 14 times per year
- Total circulation: 500,000 (2011)
- Founded: 1886
- Company: DTN
- Country: United States
- Based in: Birmingham, Alabama
- Website: www.dtnpf.com

Progressive Farmer is an agricultural magazine, published 14 times a year by DTN. The magazine is based in Birmingham, Alabama.

== History ==
Leonidas L. Polk Era

Founded as a newspaper in Winston, North Carolina, in 1886 by North Carolina native Leonidas Lafayette Polk (1837–1892; often confused with his second cousin, Confederate General Leonidas Polk), the publication was intended to bring the latest information on crop and livestock production to the reunited nation's agrarian economy in the Southeast. It also functioned as a political organ for the Farmers' Alliance, advocating for Alliance policies such as free silver, railroad rate regulation, and the establishment of an agricultural college in Raleigh. While it initially endorsed Democratic politicians affiliated with the Farmers' Alliance, Polk helped form the Populist Party in 1892, and shifted the Progressive Farmer to support the Populists. As Polk's involvement in the Farmers' Alliance and Populist Party grew, he handed over editorial control to James L. Ramsey of Raleigh.

Populist-Republican Fusion

After Polk died in 1892, the paper was passed to his oldest daughter, Leonita Polk Denmark. Editorial control remained with Ramsey. Under Ramsey, the Progressive Farmer became a leading voice of the Populist movement. The paper advocated for a coalition with the state's Republicans and African American voters, while representing the Populists as the party which truly represented white farmers and workers. The Progressive Farmer denounced the Democratic Party as favoring the class interests of banks, railroads, and industrialists, at the expense of workers. Meanwhile, it depicted calls for white supremacy and fear mongering about African Americans as a strategy to distract working class whites from their class interests. On the national level, the paper endorsed the William Jennings Bryan campaign in the 1896 election.

Due to the failure of Bryan's 1896 campaign, as well as North Carolina's 1898 coup that unseated the Populist-Republican Fusion government, the Populist movement rapidly declined.

Clarence Poe's Acquisition

Clarence H. Poe from Raleigh, NC, who has long served as a writer for the Progressive Farmer took over as editor in 1899. Poe distanced the paper from its Populist past, and instead supported a more moderate agenda. Poe used the paper to advocate for rural education for both black and white children. The paper supported racial segregation, but stringently denounced lynching and race-baiting politics. Gradually, Poe depoliticized the newspaper, and pivoted the paper more towards practical farming advice.

1903, he and three partners purchased the publication, taking it from a newspaper to a magazine with 36,000 subscribers by 1908. One of the most notable achievements of the magazine was its continual crusade and endorsement during the early twentieth century of the land grant college subsidies provided to Agricultural and Mechanical colleges across the United States.

=== Merger with Southern Farm Gazette ===
In Clarence Poe's first step to expand the Raleigh, North Carolina magazine into a dominant regional force, The Progressive Farmer acquired the Southern Farm Gazette newspaper published in Starkville, Mississippi. This was a major innovation in publishing at the time. Merging these two farm publications established the first publication in history to publish regional editorial specific to its circulation areas. This merger of the Progressive Farmer and the Southern Farm Gazette resulted in the need to have a production and printing facility that would be a one-day train trip to both offices in Starkville and Raleigh, North Carolina, for receiving the typewritten feature stories for publication. In 1911, it was decided to establish a central printing facility in Birmingham, Alabama while Clarence Poe and Progressive Farmer editors remained at its headquarters in Raleigh, North Carolina and directed company operations from there.

The Progressive Farmer Company continued to publish across the Southeastern and Mid-south regions soon expanding successfully into Texas and the Southwest. Serving farm information needs, publishing through two world wars, crusading for important rural farm issues such as rural electrification, soil conservation, rural education and modern agricultural technology, the magazine soared to a circulation high of 1.3 million by the 1960s.

=== Launch of Southern Living ===
In 1966, the management, led by Emory Cunningham and the editors of Progressive Farmer launched Southern Living magazine fashioned after the lifestyle and home life section in the magazine. The Progressive Farmer had extended its appeal among suburban housewives, and that segment of its circulation received the new magazine, Southern Living to establish its distribution and advertising rate base. From the pages of Progressive Farmer rose the largest and most successful regional publication in history. Consequently, Progressive Farmer was able to editorially focus more completely on production agriculture and concentrate circulation efforts to the rural farm household. The launch of Southern Living was an outstanding strategic move for the Progressive Farmer Company.

=== Midwest expansion ===
In 1980, the Progressive Farmer Company changed its name to Southern Progress Corporation in an effort to reflect its wider focus. In the early 1980s the editors of Progressive Farmer began a regional edition of Progressive Farmer in the twelve Midwestern states. It was distinctively different from the main Southern issue and was used to establish a circulation and advertising foothold in the Midwest. In 1985, Southern Progress Corporation was purchased by Time Inc. for $498 million. By the end of the decade, Progressive Farmer Midwest was incorporated into the main edition's editorial and circulation making Progressive Farmer a nationwide production agricultural and lifestyle publication with a circulation of over 700,000. During the 1990s Progressive Farmer enjoyed prominence among farm readers and advertisers with special editorial efforts in farm safety and rural recreation blended with production agricultural reporting.

=== New ownership ===
In 2007, after 130 years of publishing under the company it founded, Southern Progress Corporation, a division of Time-Warner, announced it had sold the Progressive Farmer magazine, circulation 620,000, to a former advertiser, DTN, based in Omaha, Nebraska. It was announced by DTN that Progressive Farmer would continue to be headquartered in Birmingham, Alabama.

DTN was acquired by Telvent in 2008. In 2017, Schneider Electric, which had acquired Telvent in 2011, sold it to Swiss investment group TBG.
