= Weatherzone =

Weather service in Australia

Coordinates: 33.8329035°S 151.2040019°E

- Formerly: The Weather Company
- Type: Private
- Industry: Weather
- Founded: October 1998; 28 years ago in Australia
- Founder: Mark Hardy
- Headquarters: Sydney, Australia
- Number of locations: 4 (2020)
- Area served: Australia, South Africa, Taiwan, Japan
- Key people: Mark Hardy(CEO)
- Products: Aviation Watch | Blast Dispersion Modelling | Opticast | Weatherzone's Total Lightning Network, WZTLN | Stormtracker | WxBrief
- Services: Data analysis, meteorological consulting, weather forecasting
- Owners: TBG AG, Mark Hardy
- Number of employees: 60 (2020)
- Parent: DTN
- Website: weatherzone.com

Weatherzone, known before 9 August 2010 as The Weather Company and still trading under this name, is the main provider of value-added meteorological services in Australia. Their main business lines are services to energy, utilities and mining companies. They also provide services to ports, insurance and large retail corporations. They specialize in aggregating content from a large range of private and government funded organisations (e.g. Bureau of Meteorology, Environmental Protection Authority, World Meteorological Organisation, Australian Broadcasting Corporation etc.). Weatherzone is the major commercial weather company that provides meteorological services in Australia.

== History ==
Weatherzone was founded in 1998 by former Bureau of Meteorology (BOM) meteorologist, Mark Hardy, providing graphics, scripts and weather briefings for television weather presentations. In 2008 in response to an increasing demand from industry for more accurate and more frequently updating weather forecasts, Weatherzone developed the Opticast forecast system. This system takes information from over a dozen computer models including variants of the in-house operated Weather Research and Forecasting (WRF) model. The Opticast algorithms are run every hour ensuring the forecasts are continually staying abreast of rapid and previously unforeseen meteorological changes. The accuracy of Opticast allowed weatherzone to make a successful foray into the lucrative energy and mining weather forecasting markets. Over subsequent years, many of Australia's major electricity companies commenced using weatherzone's Opticast forecasting products including AGL, Snowy Hydro, Origin and AEMO.

On 25 June 2008 Fairfax Media acquired a 75% share in Weatherzone (then known as The Weather Company) with 25% still owned by the founder, Mark Hardy who retained the Managing Director role. On 9 August 2010 The organisation changed its name from The Weather Company to Weatherzone. It still trades as The Weather Company Pty Ltd.

Weatherzone was part of Fairfax's Digital Ventures group of companies and in September 2013 Charles Solomon was appointed Managing Director.

In 2015 Weatherzone expanded into Africa with an investment in South Africa based AfricaWeather.

Weatherzone also operates the largest total lightning detection network in Australia.

On 1 October 2019 Fairfax's 75% stake in Weatherzone was acquired by US-based DTN for an undisclosed sum.

== Services ==
Weatherzone runs their own WRF computer model which is used to produce content for the subscription product, Weatherzone Pro (formerly Weatherzone Silver), and feeds into their Opticast forecasting model. It employs a team of meteorologists to offer a meteorological alternative to the Bureau of Meteorology (BOM). Weatherzone also provides services for displaying weather on websites. Some large sites that use this include Elders, an Australian agricultural site, News Corp Australia (formerly News Limited) and Fairfax Media.

Advanced forecasts and alerting products are also produced for the energy, mining and insurance industries.

Weatherzone publishes its own weather site and smartphone apps which combines their own content with Bureau of Meteorology information and that from several global providers into a user friendly and customizable interface.

Weatherzone sources surf data from Swellnet, Australia's most popular source of online surf reports, surf forecasts and live surfcam vision. It provides these weather services, for among others, The Australian Broadcasting Corporation, and world weather reports for Bloomberg Television.

Weatherzones Apple iOS app includes iPhone, iPad and WatchOS apps, enabling users to view 10-day forecasts, rain radar and BOM warnings at a glance. The iOS apps also include WeatherPulse, a daily video magazine. The app offers both a free ad funded version and a paid for subscription.
