= Rob McElwee =

Robert "Rob" McElwee (born 21 January 1961, Burton upon Trent, Staffordshire) is a weather forecaster. He was BBC Weather's longest-serving weather forecaster since the departure of Michael Fish. He presented forecasts on BBC News, BBC World News, BBC Radio 4, BBC Radio 2, BBC Radio 5 Live and BBC One. He was also a regular weather presenter on the BBC News at Ten and the BBC News at Six, having previously forecast on the BBC News at One.

According to his LinkedIn page, since December 2014, McElwee is a senior weather presenter for Al Jazeera.

== Early life ==
He gained an HNC in maths, statistics and physics from Reading College of Technology (now Reading College).

== Career ==
McElwee joined the Met Office in 1982, working as a weather observer, spending most of the next eight years observing the weather on the Army Air Corps base at Netheravon on Salisbury Plain. Following this, he trained as a forecaster and worked at airbases in East Anglia.

He joined the BBC Weather Centre in May 1991, making his first appearance in July. He is a Fellow of the Royal Meteorological Society. In 2009, he lived with his wife Rosanne MacMillan (previously a continuity announcer for BBC TV) and sons in Buckinghamshire.

McElwee presented his final forecast on BBC One on 10 January 2011, during which he forecast rain with chances of snow for most of the UK. He ended the forecast saying, "'Till then, a bit of snow still. That's it from me. That's it from me, really. Goodnight." He was moved to backroom forecasting duties by the Met Office as part of a cost-cutting exercise.
