= Peter Cockroft =

English weather forecaster

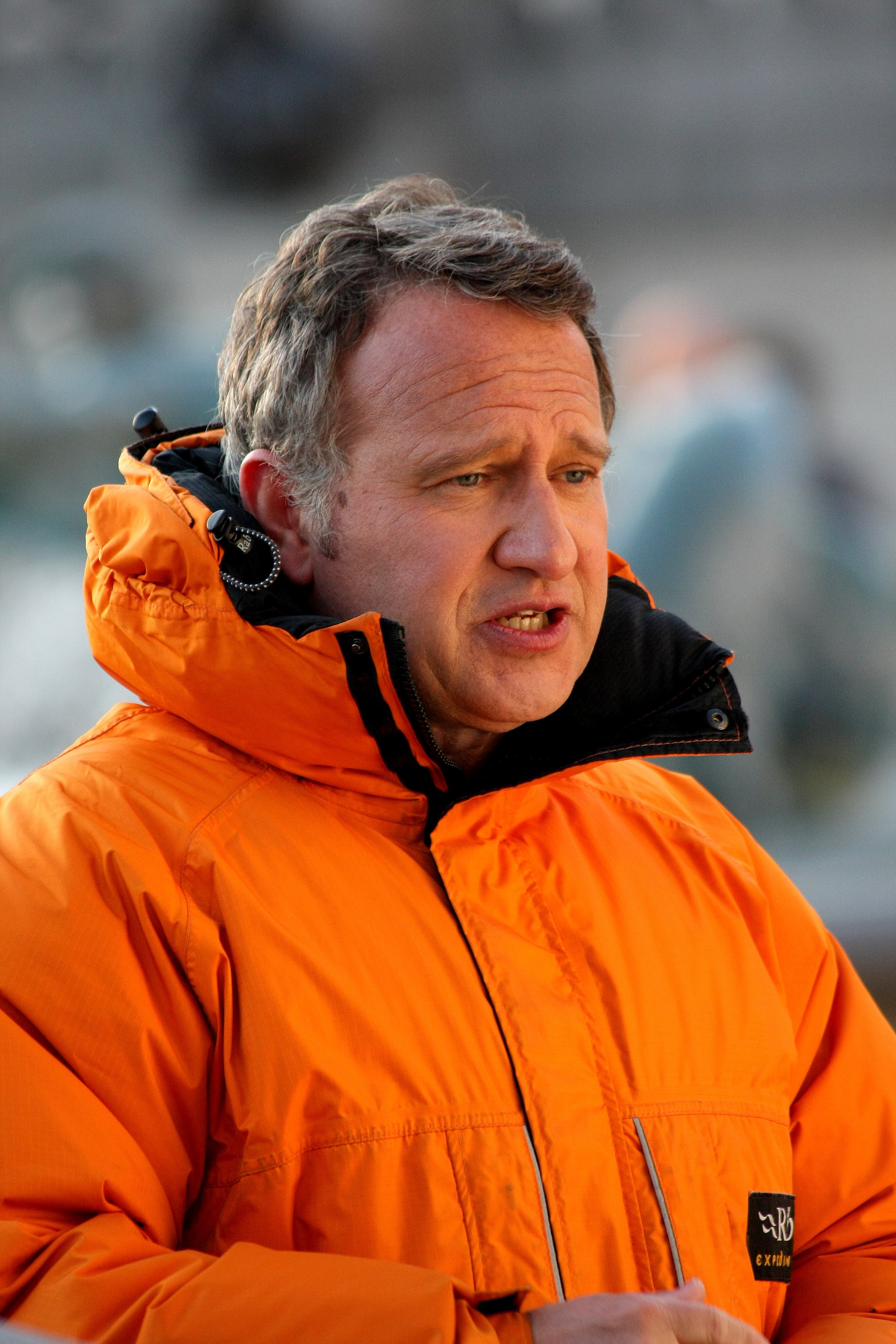
Peter Cockroft during a broadcast for BBC London News

Peter Cockroft (born 13 April 1957 in Catterick, North Riding of Yorkshire) is an English weather forecaster. Cockroft joined the BBC in 1991 as one of the presenters of the national weather forecasts; in 2002, he became the main weather presenter on BBC London News. He gave his last broadcast for BBC London on 27 December 2013.

== Biography ==
He attended Swanage Grammar School. He left school with 8 O levels, and later gained an ONC and HND in science and physics.

He joined the Met Office in 1974, although he did not become a weather forecaster until 1990. He joined the BBC in 1991, after being spotted by Bill Giles when forecasting for the Royal Air Force, and became one of the presenters of the national weather forecasts. In 2002, he became the main weather presenter on BBC London News. He left BBC London News on 27 December 2013.

As of 2008, he lived in Oxfordshire with his wife Ann and their daughter Rosie, and was a keen sailor, competing in the Fastnet Race twice.
