= Predicasts =

Predicasts, Inc. was among the first firms in the nascent information science industry and provided computerized data on businesses and industries. Predicasts was founded by Samuel Wolpert in 1960. ‘After a decade of work as a statistician in government and an economist in industry, Samuel Wolpert founded a small company in Cleveland, Ohio, to publish a collection of product forecasts based on the SIC Code.The journal was intentioned as quarterly and to appeal to market researchers. In the first three years, annual revenue was under $50,000, but by 1970, sales had reached the $1 million mark. By the end of the 1970s, Predicasts had 25 publications, 120 employees, $4.5 million in revenue, and $0.7 million in pretax profits’. In 1982 Indian Head (the U.S. subsidiary of Thyssen-Bornemisza N.V. of the Netherlands.) purchased Predicasts, later reselling it to Information Access. In the early 1970’s businesses could access this information from their own computer terminals through Predicasts own PTS system which, at the time, was one of the largest online business information systems in the world.
