= Jarl Andersen =

Norwegian meteorologist and weather presenter

Jarl Malkon Andersen (born 5 February 1946) is a Norwegian meteorologist and weather presenter.

He was hired in the Norwegian Meteorological Institute in 1977, and became a prime time weather presenter for the Norwegian Broadcasting Corporation. After two non-consecutive periods as a weather presenter he retired on 1 January 2008.
