= Spensa Technologies =

Company in Lafayette, United States

Coordinates: 40.4647°N 86.9273°W

- Type: Private
- Industry: Precision agriculture
- Founded: January 16, 2009; 17 years ago in West Lafayette, Indiana
- Founder: Johnny Park
- Headquarters: West Lafayette, Indiana
- Key people: Johnny Park, CEO
- Products: Spensa AP, Z-Trap
- Owner: DTN
- Number of employees: 30 (2018)
- Website: spensatech.com

Spensa Technologies was a private company based in the Purdue Research Park in West Lafayette, Indiana, United States, that specialized in precision agriculture. The company, founded in 2009, was known for its ag-related technology, including automated pest sensors and software. It was acquired in April 2018 by DTN.

== History ==
Spensa was founded on 16 January 2009 by Johnny Park, a computer engineering professor at Purdue University, whose research into robotics and computer vision in farming (supported by a $6.4M USDA grant) led to the creation of the company. With support from the National Science Foundation and private investment, Spensa expanded its operations and developed agriculture-related hardware and software products.

Spensa's principal hardware product was the Z-Trap, an automated electronic device that detects insects in a field and wirelessly reports its data. Its software consisted of both web-based and mobile applications, centered on the Spensa Agronomic Platform (AP), a subscription-based software.

Spensa was acquired in April 2018 by Minneapolis-based DTN, a company owned by TBG AG.
