= Pitsford Hall weather station =

Weather station in Pitsford, Northamptonshire

Coordinates: 52.303°N 0.892°W

Pitsford Weather Centre, formerly Pitsford Hall weather station, is an climatological station maintained by Pitsford School in the village of Pitsford, Northamptonshire. The centre was established in 1998 and issues local forecasts for the county as well as maintaining a detailed and continuous weather record. The centre maintains the Met Office climate station for Northampton, officially known as Pitsford, Northampton. The centre is a regular contributor to weather-related articles in the local press and has featured on local and national TV and radio. An analysis of each month's weather as well special articles are published in the centre's Monthly Weather report received by the British Library and available online and in hard copy to subscribers.

The weather station has been run by Sixth Form students using traditional meteorological instruments from its inception in 1998 until 2016 when the site became fully automatic and renamed Pitsford Weather Centre. However, manual observations were recommenced in 2018 when the site was incorporated into the Met Office network of climatological monitoring stations.

The Weather information is now available via Twitter and Facebook as well as smartphone apps for iPhone and Android.

An extensive archive of county weather records is held by the station which date back to 1880 and the station continues to receive weather records from a number of sites from across the county.

The weather centre's most popular feature remains its Daily Weather Report, a comprehensive 3 day forecast for Northamptonshire, distributed by free subscription email.

The station enjoys the patronage of broadcast meteorologists Michael Fish MBE (now retired) and Alex Deakin. It is a corporate member of the Royal Meteorological Society.
