= Meteomedia AG =

Meteomedia is a company founded by Jörg Kachelmann, which operated a large network of Weather stations in Switzerland, Austria and Germany. The company's services included weather forecasts, severe weather warnings and meteorological consultancy. In 2013, MeteoGroup acquired Meteomedia. From March 2014 Meteomedia traded under the name and brand of MeteoGroup. In November 2019, MeteoGroup was integrated into US weather services company DTN (owned by TBG).
