= MeteoGroup =

Multinational meteorological company

- Company type: Private
- Industry: Meteorology
- Founded: 1986
- Founder: Harry Otten
- Defunct: November 2019
- Fate: Integrated into DTN
- Headquarters: Utrecht, The Netherlands
- Number of locations: Belgium, Canada, France, Germany, Ireland, Italy, the Netherlands, the Philippines, Poland, Singapore, Spain, Sweden, Switzerland, Turkey, the United Kingdom, the United States
- Key people: Marc Chesover (President and Member of the Board) David Porter (COO) Ben Kelly (General Counsel and Member of the Board)
- Products: SPOS, NowCastingPro, WeatherAPI, RoadMaster, RunwayMaster, WeatherSuite, FleetGuard, RouteGuard, MetOceanPro, DynamicLineRating
- Services: Weather Technology & Data
- Number of employees: 400+
- Parent: TBG AG
- Website: www.meteogroup.com

MeteoGroup was a private weather forecasting organisation based in Europe, with offices also in the United States. MeteoGroup provided weather information to markets that included transport, marine, agriculture, energy and the media. MeteoGroup had a portfolio of weather apps: WeatherPro, MeteoEarth and Magical Weather. In 2013, MeteoGroup was acquired by General Atlantic. In 2018, MeteoGroup was acquired by TBG AG.

In November 2019, MeteoGroup was integrated into US weather services company DTN (also owned by TBG).

== History ==
In 1986, Meteo Consult B.V, was set up in the Netherlands by Harry Otten, a Dutch TV weather presenter. It was one of the first European private-sector weather businesses.

At that time, the Royal Netherlands Meteorological Institute dominated all the Dutch markets and access by private companies to essential meteorological data and models was severely restricted. Meteo Consult lobbied the Government of the Netherlands for fair and equal data access, and for the opening of weather markets to the private sector. As a result, Meteo Consult grew in both the media and B2B markets.

=== Initial European expansion ===
In the early 1990s Meteo Consult started expanding outside of the Netherlands and also into marine services. The company began working with a major international energy and petrochemical company to develop an on-board routing system for the shipping market. SPOS, its proprietary weather routing system, is now a market leader and is installed on over 2,000 vessels worldwide.

In 1993 Meteo Consult set up its first business outside the Netherlands when a joint venture for the German market was established in Berlin. In 1998 the joint venture came to an end and its wholly owned German subsidiary MC-Wetter was established.

=== Joint venture with PA ===
Further European expansion quickly followed. In 1996 Meteo Consult became a majority shareholder in Meteo Services in Belgium (now MeteoGroup Belgium) and in 1997 a joint venture was established with the Press Association in the UK - PA WeatherCentre.

In 1998 Meteo Consult acquired a majority shareholding in MeteoGraphics, a graphics business specialising in visualising weather. Also based in Berlin, MeteoGraphics works closely with the German subsidiary of MeteoGroup.

In May 2005, a majority shareholding in Meteo Consult B.V was acquired by the PA Group, an international group of news, containing information and communications businesses which include the Press Association, the national news agency of the UK and Ireland.

The Press Association and Meteo Consult had worked together since 1997 in a successful joint venture in the UK, PA WeatherCentre Ltd, now MeteoGroup UK, combining the meteorological skills of Meteo Consult with the packaging and delivery skills of the Press Association. This acquisition broadened PA Group's diversified information services for international markets, helping the company to enter new markets.

=== Rebranding as MeteoGroup ===
In September 2006, the business was re-branded as MeteoGroup, which brought together all its businesses under a single brand. Meteo Consult has retained its original brand name alongside the strapline 'A MeteoGroup Company'.

MeteoGroup España was launched in 2006 with an office in Madrid and, in 2007, MeteoGroup opened new weather operations in Poland (MeteoGroup Polska) and Sweden (MeteoGroup Scandinavia). A new business was launched in France in April 2009 (MeteoGroup France), bringing the number of European MeteoGroup operations to eight.

=== Launch of US office ===
In 2010 MeteoGroup expanded into the United States and launched MeteoGroup USA.

In May 2011, MeteoGroup acquired Nowcasting International Limited, an Ireland-based company specialising in technology for offshore weather forecasting. The company now forms part of MeteoGroup Offshore, a dedicated division supplying meteorological and oceanographic products and services to the offshore industry.

At the end of 2011 MeteoGroup Italia was set up in Italy.

In the summer of 2017 MeteoGroup withdrew from the US transportation business, ending all relationships with their US sales force.

=== Expansion into Southeast Asia ===
In July 2012, MeteoGroup Singapore was launched, initially focusing on providing weather products and services to the Southeast Asian shipping and offshore markets.

=== Major European acquisition ===
In September 2013, MeteoGroup acquired mminternational (Europe) AG, a major Swiss-German weather company. According to its press release, this expanded MeteoGroup's global operations to 14 countries, making it one of the largest weather companies in the world with almost 400 employees and combined annual turnover of more than €50 million.

=== BBC Weather ===
On 6 February 2018 BBC Weather changed supplier after nearly a century from the government Met Office to MeteoGroup, after being required to put its weather services out to tender. Some claimed that the BBC's forecasts were less accurate following the change to MeteoGroup. In 2025 the Met Office was reinstated as BBC weather service provider, as an agreement between the two organisations in the interests of public service rather than a commercial relationship involving procurement.

=== Acquisition by TBG AG ===
In 2018 MeteoGroup was acquired by TBG AG, a private venture capital firm based in Zurich, Switzerland.

=== Integration into DTN ===
In November 2019, MeteoGroup was integrated into US weather services company DTN (also owned by TBG AG) and was rebranded as DTN, establishing a DTN European headquarters in Utrecht, Netherlands.
