= TBG =

TBG may refer to:

- TBG AG, formerly Thyssen-Bornemisza Group, the investment arm of the Thyssen family
- Thyroxine-binding globulin, a transport protein
- Traditional Britain Group, a far-right British pressure group
- Tønsberg, a city in Norway
