= Meteomedia =

Meteomedia may mean:

- MétéoMédia, a Canadian French-language cable television channel specializing on weather
- Meteomedia AG, a company providing weather data in Germany and Switzerland
