= Alex Deakin =

English meteorologist

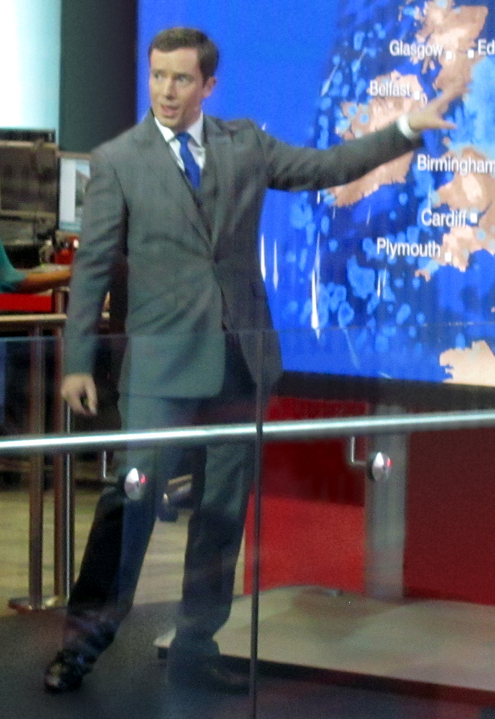
Deakin presenting the weather in 2013

Alexander Roy Deakin is a meteorologist and weather forecaster for the Met Office, appearing regularly on Channel 5 and GB News. Deakin was formerly on BBC services and was one of the main weather presenters on the BBC News at Ten. He joined the Weather team on BBC Breakfast in January 2007 and appeared regularly at the weekends and as cover during the week.

== Education ==
Deakin attended South Hunsley Secondary School on East Dale Road in Melton and went on to achieve a master's degree from the University of Birmingham in Physics with Astrophysics. After university, Deakin joined the British Meteorological (Met) Office, for which he initially worked in a number of places, including York and Bristol. In 2000, he joined the team of Met Office staffers who used to provide weather forecasts for the BBC, before BBC Weather became independent from the Met Office.

== Career ==
On 23 August 2003, Deakin appeared on the BBC/Open University's television programme Star Party, which was broadcast live from Jodrell Bank Observatory. In a number of segments during the show he gave reports on the type of weather that is experienced on Mars. In 2004, Deakin became patron of Pitsford Hall weather station in Northamptonshire.

In January 2012, Deakin appeared on The Great Sport Relief Bake Off. Deakin has appeared regularly on Countryfile when the programme has its weekly weather forecast, to read the weather forecast for the oncoming week.

Deakin is a keen recycler and in 2006 helped promote the recycling scheme of the Yorkshire town of Hessle. He also appeared on Celebrity Mastermind, first aired on 7 January 2010, the coldest day of the winter of 2009–10.

He left the BBC team in October 2016 to rejoin the Met Office.

He is now a weather presenter, for the Met Office, on GB News and 5 News.

== See also ==
- BBC Weather
