= Ian McCaskill =

British weather forecaster (1938–2016)

- McCaskill, 1980s
- Born: John Robertson McCaskill; 28 July 1938; Glasgow, Scotland
- Died: 10 December 2016 (aged 78); South Milford, North Yorkshire, England
- Education: Queen's Park Secondary
- Alma mater: University of Glasgow
- Occupation: Meteorologist
- Spouses: Lesley Charlesworth (m. 1959; died 1992) Pat Cromack (m. 1998)

Ian McCaskill (born John Robertson McCaskill; 28 July 1938 – 10 December 2016) was a Scottish meteorologist and television and radio presenter, who frequently presented weather forecasts on the BBC. Born in Glasgow and an alumnus of the University of Glasgow, he began working for the Met Office in 1961, producing long range forecasts for aircraft. McCaskill began appearing on BBC Television and Radio in 1978, presenting weather bulletins until his retirement from the Met Office in 1998. He was a fellow of the Royal Meteorological Society and the vice-president of the Epilepsy Society.

== Early life ==
McCaskill was born John Robertson McCaskill in Glasgow on 28 July 1938. He was the son of an insurance agent, and was brought up in a tenement block near Queen's Park, in the south part of Glasgow. McCaskill attended Queen's Park Secondary in Glasgow, and then the University of Glasgow, where he read geology and chemistry in his bid to go into teaching, after giving up his ambition to become a doctor because the university required an undergraduate degree before enrolling at the University of Glasgow School of Medicine, Dentistry & Nursing. He was cox for the rowing team on the Forth and Clyde Canal at the boathouse close to Glasgow Green and was keen on amateur dramatics.

== Career ==
McCaskill joined the RAF in 1959 as part of his National Service and became an airman meteorologist through his background in science, first in Scotland with the RAF Meteorological Corps at RAF Kinloss and then at RAF Akrotiri in Cyprus. He once joked that when he joined the RAF, he was given a choice between catering and meteorology, claiming he did not know what meteorology was but he knew he could not cook. He left the RAF in 1961 when he was demobilised, and joined the Met Office, thinking a meteorological career would give him a secure career without more training. McCaskill was posted to Glasgow Prestwick Airport, Malta and the Manchester Weather Centre, producing long-range forecasts for aircraft.

During the late 1970s, McCaskill answered a memo from the BBC that opened entries for Met Office staff to volunteer to join its presenting team for news broadcasts. In 1978, after a videotape audition, McCaskill began working at the BBC Weather Centre in London, and presented the weather forecast for the BBC on both television and radio. He frequently presented the forecasts without shoes on so he could avoid generating static electricity. From 1983 to 1985, he had a two-year break from the BBC, doing weather forecasting for Central Television at Birmingham Airport. In 1987, McCaskill supplied his colleague Michael Fish the inaccurate forecast in which Fish told the nation that no hurricane was due the evening before the Great storm of 1987, something he admitted to doing in 2005. He made his final BBC television broadcast on 14 June 1998, and his last radio broadcast was on BBC Radio 4's Today programme the following day. Compelled to by Civil Service rules, McCaskill retired from the Met Office on 31 July 1998 in order to spend more time with his family.

McCaskill was known for his soft-spoken demeanor, and his presentation style was widely imitated, including by the satirical comedy show Spitting Image and by impersonator Rory Bremner, both of which he appreciated. He was one of the weathermen mentioned on the novelty song "John Kettley Is a Weatherman" by A Tribe of Toffs in 1988. In 1998, McCaskill helped the Post Office launch a range of six new insurance policies, and appeared in a comedic television advertisement for BT pay phones set in Brighton. He read the weather in a guest role for two weeks on the ITV breakfast franchise GMTV in lieu of Simon Keeling in mid-1999, and in the same year, presented the BBC Two series The Essential Guide to the Weather.

McCaskill worked as a motivational speaker, and was also a guest on various other programmes. He appeared as a judge on the BBC One cooking competition programmes MasterChef in 1995 and Junior MasterChef in 1998. McCaskill was a panellist on Have I Got News for You in October 1998, as well as in a number of television advertisements and in pantomime, making his debut as the titular character in Puss in Boots at the Theatre Royal, Windsor from December 1998 to January 1999. He also participated in the first series of Celebrity Fit Club in 2002 and was a contestant on Celebrity MasterChef in 2006. Other programmes he appeared on included Tomorrow's World, Children in Need, Crackerjack!, Blankety Blank, Celebrity Ready Steady Cook and So Graham Norton.

In 2006, he co-wrote the book Frozen in Time, about Britain's worst-ever winters, with Paul Hudson. McCaskill was a fellow of the Royal Meteorological Society and the vice-president of the Epilepsy Society. In May 2000, he opened the first phase of the £1.2 million 11-hectare (27-acre) Lower Leas Coastal Park in Folkestone.

== Personal life and death ==
McCaskill lived at Seer Green, near Beaconsfield in Buckinghamshire. He had two daughters with his first wife Lesley Charlesworth, a primary teacher, to whom he was married from 1959 until her death from breast cancer in 1992. In 1998, he married his family friend Patricia Cromack, becoming stepfather to her two sons, and moving to Yorkshire. McCaskill was diagnosed with dementia in 2011. He died, in a nursing home in South Milford close to Selby, Yorkshire, on 10 December 2016, aged 78.

== Books ==
- McCaskill, Ian; Hudson, Paul (27 October 2006), Frozen in Time: The Worst Winters in History, Ilkley: Great Northern Books Ltd, ISBN 9781905080090
- McCaskill, Ian; Hudson, Paul (1 October 2011), Frozen Britain, Ilkley: Great Northern Books Ltd, ISBN 9781905080984
