= List of storms named Floyd =

The name Floyd was used for four tropical cyclones in the Atlantic Ocean.

- Hurricane Floyd (1981) – caused heavy rainfall on the Leeward Islands, then passed near Bermuda but caused no major damage.
- Hurricane Floyd (1987) – crossed over Cuba and impacted the Florida Keys and the Bahamas, but no major damage.
- Hurricane Floyd (1993) – made a circuit of the Atlantic before striking Brittany, France as a strong extratropical storm.
- Hurricane Floyd (1999) – deadliest United States hurricane in 27 years, killing 56 in the U.S. and one in the Bahamas, and causing $4.5 billion in damage, at the time the third-costliest storm in U.S. history.

The name Floyd was retired after the 1999 season, and was replaced by Franklin in the 2005 season.

The name Floyd has also been used to name one tropical cyclone in the Southern Hemisphere.

- Cyclone Floyd (2006) – a storm that peaked at Category 4 on the Australian intensity scale.
