= Swanage Grammar School =

School in Dorset, England

Coordinates: 50.620°N 1.964°W

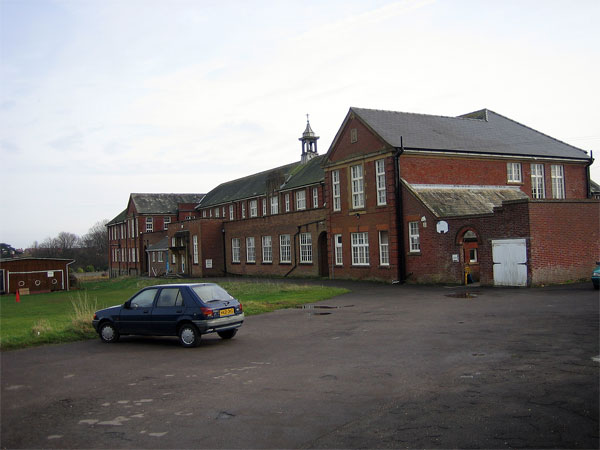
The Old Grammar School

Swanage Grammar School was a former school in Swanage, Dorset, England.

Established in 1929 (97 years ago), the school was opened by the Earl of Shaftesbury. It closed in 1974 and was used as an outdoor education centre until 2002. A 2012 proposal to build a new secondary school on the site was withdrawn. The school was acquired by Barratt Homes, who in 2022 demolished the buildings and built a housing development on the site.

== Notable former pupils ==
- Peter Cockroft, BBC weather presenter
- Peter Foote, Professor of Scandinavian Studies from 1963–83 at University College London
- David Mellor, Conservative MP for Putney from 1979–97
