= Pitsford School =

Location
- Pitsford Hall; Pitsford, Northamptonshire, NN6 9AX; England; 52°18′11″N 0°53′32″W

Information
- Type: Co-educational independent School
- Motto: Opportunity ~ Excellence ~ Understanding
- Established: 1989
- Founder: Malcolm Robinson
- Headmaster: Craig G. Walker
- Gender: Mixed
- Age: 4 to 18
- Enrolment: 440
- Houses: Hesketh, Robinson, Wake
- Colours: Blue, Gold
- Website: http://www.pitsfordschool.com/

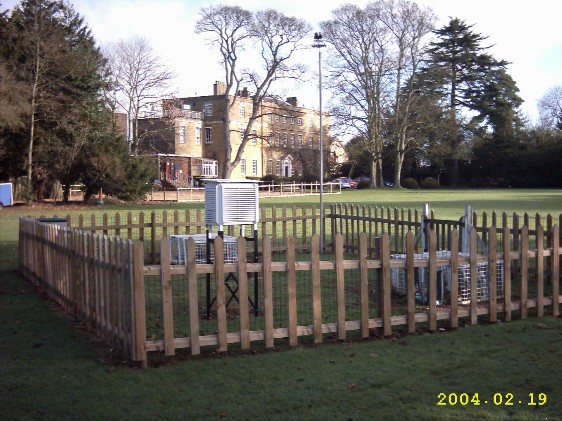
Pitsford Hall, now occupied by Pitsford School. Formerly the seat of Henry Lloyd (1840-1902), a cadet member of the Lloyd family (Quakers, iron-founders and bankers) of Dolobran, Montgomeryshire, who served as High Sheriff of Montgomeryshire in 1883.

Pitsford School, established 1989, was a co-educational, 3-18 independent day school in Pitsford, Northamptonshire. Originally called Northamptonshire Grammar School, the school changed its name to Pitsford School in September 2011. Pitsford School was run by the Northamptonshire Independent Grammar School Charity Trust, set up on 27 July 1998. The trust was registered with the Charity Commission in August 1988 to promote and provide for the advancement of education. On 6 September 1989, the school opened with 47 boys admitted across three year groups, Y7-9. The founding Headmaster was Malcolm Tozer, the last headmaster was Craig Walker.

== History ==
The main building is the Georgian Pitsford Hall, built in 1764 for Colonel James Money. The architect was John Johnson who also designed Kingsthorpe Hall and the County (or City) Rooms in Leicester. It was a private house and estate until it was sold to the Polish order of the Holy Family of Nazareth who set up the Holy Family of Nazareth Convent School in 1947. This school closed in 1984 and the estate was bought by Northamptonshire Independent Grammar School Charity Trust Ltd, who opened the new school on Wednesday 6 September 1989. Initially the school was boys only but admitted girls ten years later in 1999.

Pitsford School was founded by Malcolm Robinson with support from patrons Christian Lady Hesketh OBE, DL, and Sir Hereward Wake Bart, MC, DL.

The school maintains a meteorological station, Pitsford Hall weather station, which was founded in 1998. The station is run by Sixth Form pupils as a long-term community service project and receives the patronage of broadcast meteorologist Alex Deakin.

The school was due to close for good on 10 July 2026. The Board of Governors said this was due to "external economic pressures." These included the imposition of VAT on private schools, the removal of business rate relief, increases in the National Minimum Wage, higher interest rates and economic uncertainty.They also said that administrators were likely to be appointed.

== Curriculum ==
Pitsford School offered GCSE and A Level examinations. Most students progressed to Higher Education, with annually 66% to "World Ranked Universities" and 9.5% to Oxford and Cambridge and University College London.

== Buildings ==
As the school grew, new buildings were added to accommodate the increasing pupil numbers.

The Michael Robinson Memorial Library was built in 1992. The foundation stone was dedicated by Queen Elizabeth The Queen Mother during a ceremony in the school gymnasium, shortly before the building was completed on 30 June 1992.

The Sunley Science and Technology was built in 1998. The guest of honour at the official opening was ex-Prime minister Baroness Margaret Thatcher.

The Duckworth Building was completed in February 2012 and houses the Junior School. This building celebrates the support since the founding of the School of Keith Duckworth and his family. It is situated on the old orchard site to the North of Pitsford Hall.

== Notable visitors ==
=== Queen Mother ===
On 30 June 1992, Queen Elizabeth The Queen Mother visited Northamptonshire Grammar School and laid the Foundation stone of the Michael Robinson Memorial Library. The Queen Mother regularly visited Pitsford Hall in the twenties and thirties as a guest of Captain Drummond, Master of the Pytchley Hunt. The small conservatory at the front of the house was added by Captain Drummond so that the then Queen Mother, Queen Mary, could watch her granddaughters' riding lessons on the front lawn. This was renovated in time for the Royal Visit. The school now awards the Queen Elizabeth the Queen Mother Scholarship.
