= Ben Rich (weather forecaster) =

British meteorologist

- Born: Benjamin John Rich; 10 January 1985 (age 41); Plymouth, Devon, England
- Education: University of Southampton; University College Falmouth
- Occupation: Meteorologist
- Years active: 2009–present
- Employer: BBC

Benjamin John Rich (born 10 January 1985) is a British meteorologist and BBC Weather forecaster.

== Early life ==
Benjamin John Rich was born on 10 January 1985 in Plymouth and was raised in rural Devon. At school Rich gave classmates and teachers daily handmade weather forecasts.

Rich studied for a degree in Geography and Environmental Science at the University of Southampton, and then completed an MA in Broadcast Journalism at University College Falmouth.

== Career ==
Rich worked as a newsreader for a short time and was then a reporter for local radio stations in Bristol and Manchester. He became a weather presenter for BBC's Midlands Today in Birmingham in 2009, providing daily weather forecasts and presenting regional TV news bulletins. He also produced in-depth features on weather-related subjects such as climate change.

He presented national and international weather forecasts at the BBC from late 2012 to late 2013, when he commenced studies at the Met Office College in Exeter to complete his training as a meteorologist. He broadcasts at the BBC and provides forecasts for RAF pilots.

== Personal life ==
Rich had played violin in the London Gay Symphony Orchestra.
