= Dianne White Clatto =

American weathercaster and news anchor (1938–2015)

- Clatto during her TV days
- Born: Dianne Elizabeth Johnson; December 28, 1938; St. Louis, Missouri
- Died: May 4, 2015 (aged 76); St. Louis, Missouri
- Education: University of Missouri at Columbia
- Occupations: Weathercaster, news anchor

Dianne White Clatto (1938–2015), best known during her professional career as Dianne White, was an American weathercaster, news anchor, and public servant. She was best known for her role as the first African-American weathercaster in the United States, and also served as a news anchor. After she left television, she worked as a special assistant to Mayor Francis Slay.

== Biography ==
Clatto was born on December 28, 1938, in St. Louis as Dianne Elizabeth Johnson. She studied piano and classical ballet in her youth and attended the Sumner High School, a segregated school in St. Louis. She went on to earn her BA in psychiatric social work from the University of Missouri at Columbia, where she was one of 8 black students out of 14,000 students, and worked as a clothing model, becoming the first African-American fashion model for stores like Saks Fifth Avenue in St. Louis.

In 1960, she auditioned for a role in a show on a showboat, which she was awarded, and held an impromptu concert. She was subsequently unexpectedly offered a role as a weathercaster on a meeting she assumed was an Avon sales call and after training, in August 1961, became the United States' first full-time African American weathercaster. She has recounted that during her first show, just before she went on, she had diarrhea, but ultimately made it on in time. She went on air just four hours after the birth of her baby.

She also hosted a talk show on TV and a talk radio show, and was a sports broadcast reporter on the St. Louis Cardinals. During her time as weathercaster, she faced racism from callers and the audience, and faced further racism during her pregnancy.

She was let go in 1986, and sued KSDK for age discrimination and harassment. She won the case and was awarded $110,000, close to three times her then-annual salary. She subsequently received a $135,000 deposit in her account, and after being told it was probably part of the settlement, used it. She was charged with one count of federal larceny and spent six months in a halfway house. She was also required to pay back $50,000. She soon rejoined television, though. She has stated that she paid back every penny of the $135,000.

She went on to work at the mayor's office as a special assistant for Francis Slay, while still hosting a show.

She also helped raise funds to build the Gateway Arch and 11 girls' clubs. She was married three times: the first two ended in divorce, but her third husband was John Clatto, who she was married to for 25 years until his death in 1997.

She died on May 4, 2015, in a retirement facility. She wrote her own obituary and prepaid for her funeral. Her body was donated to the Washington University School of Medicine. She is in the Missouri Media Hall of Fame and St. Louis Media Hall of Fame.
