= Philip Avery =

British weather forecaster

Philip Avery (born 15 November 1959) is a British meteorologist and BBC Weather forecaster.

== Early life ==
Although from a West Country family, Avery was born in Dunfermline, Scotland when his father was posted to Scotland with the Royal Navy.

== Career ==
After his initial training with the Royal Navy, Avery spent time at a naval air station before joining a helicopter squadron embarked in HMS Ark Royal. Over the following two years he forecasted across the world, after which he joined a Search and Rescue squadron, based at Prestwick in Scotland. Within four years, he completed his time in the Navy and achieved an MBA.

Avery helped to launch The Weather Network, a 24-hour cable-channel based in Birmingham, before moving to London to work with the Weather Channel. After a year he joined the BBC Weather Centre, in April 1998, becoming a household name appearing regularly on BBC News, BBC World News, BBC Red Button, BBC Radio 2, BBC Radio 5 Live and BBC Radio 4, where he was a regular forecaster on the Today programme. He previously forecast on the BBC News at Ten, the BBC News at Six and the BBC News at One.

Avery took time out from presenting between September 2004 and July 2005 to take part in the Global Challenge 2004-2005 yacht race.

In October 2010 it was announced that Avery would no longer be presenting BBC weather forecasts. Despite this, he returned to broadcasting on the BBC a few years later. Avery has since presented the weather for BBC's Gardeners' World and is now a regular presenter on BBC One.
