= Jay Wynne =

British weather forecaster (1968–2025)

- Born: 30 August 1968; London, England
- Died: 3 June 2025 (aged 56); England
- Occupation: Weather forecaster
- Years active: 1999–2025
- Known for: Presenting BBC Weather

Jay Wynne (30 August 1968 – 3 June 2025) was a British BBC Weather forecaster, appearing mainly on BBC News 24, BBC Radio 4, BBC World and BBC One.

Wynne was a weather presenter on the BBC Ten O'Clock News, and occasionally the BBC Six O'Clock News and the BBC One O'Clock News.

== Early life ==
Wynne was born in London in 1968 to American parents and educated at Ardingly College, West Sussex. He studied civil engineering at Heriot-Watt University. Two years into his course, he left and worked as a technician for three years on offshore oil rigs in the North Sea. He went back to university and graduated in 1996 in environmental geography from the University of Aberdeen. He worked as an English teacher in 1997 in Fukuoka, Japan.

He graduated from Reading University with a MSc in applied meteorology in 1999.

== Career ==
In 1999, he joined the Met Office, undertaking a 14-month training programme that included a six-month posting at RAF Northolt. During this period, he gained experience in aviation forecasting and operational meteorology before moving into broadcast work.

He joined the BBC Weather team in October 2000, initially presenting on BBC World News and BBC Radio 4. He later became a regular forecaster across a range of BBC outlets and appeared frequently on the flagship bulletin BBC News at Ten.

== Death ==
Wynne died in June 2025, at the age of 56, after a long-term illness. His death was not made public until September.
