= Solid-phase synthesis =

Method of synthesizing complex molecules

In chemistry, solid-phase synthesis is a method in which molecules are covalently bound on a solid support material and synthesised step-by-step in a single reaction vessel utilising selective protecting group chemistry. Benefits compared with normal synthesis in a liquid state include:

- High efficiency and throughput
- Increased simplicity and speed

The reaction can be driven to completion and high yields through the use of excess reagent. In this method, building blocks are protected at all reactive functional groups. The order of functional group reactions can be controlled by the order of deprotection. This method is used for the synthesis of peptides, deoxyribonucleic acid (DNA), ribonucleic acid (RNA), and other molecules that need to be synthesised in a certain alignment. More recently, this method has also been used in combinatorial chemistry and other synthetic applications. The process was originally developed in the 1950s and 1960s by Robert Bruce Merrifield in order to synthesise peptide chains, and which was the basis for his 1984 Nobel Prize in Chemistry.

In the basic method of solid-phase synthesis, building blocks that have two functional groups are used. One of the functional groups of the building block is usually protected by a protective group. The starting material is a bead which binds to the building block. At first, this bead is added into the solution of the protected building block and stirred. After the reaction between the bead and the protected building block is completed, the solution is removed and the bead is washed. Then the protecting group is removed and the above steps are repeated. After all steps are finished, the synthesised compound is chemically cleaved from the bead.

If a compound containing more than two kinds of building blocks is synthesised, a step is added before the deprotection of the building block bound to the bead; a functional group which is on the bead and did not react with an added building block has to be protected by another protecting group which is not removed at the deprotective condition of the building block. Byproducts which lack the building block of this step only are prevented by this step. In addition, this step makes it easy to purify the synthesised compound after cleavage from the bead.

== Solid-phase peptide synthesis (SPPS) ==
Solid-phase synthesis is a common technique for peptide synthesis. Usually, peptides are synthesised from the carbonyl group side (C-terminus) to amino group side (N-terminus) of the amino acid chain in the SPPS method, although peptides are biologically synthesised in the opposite direction in cells. In peptide synthesis, an amino-protected amino acid is bound to a solid phase material or resin (most commonly, low cross-linked polystyrene beads), forming a covalent bond between the carbonyl group and the resin, most often an amido or an ester bond. Then the amino group is deprotected and reacted with the carbonyl group of the next N-protected amino acid. The solid phase now bears a dipeptide. This cycle is repeated to form the desired peptide chain. After all reactions are complete, the synthesised peptide is cleaved from the bead.

The protecting groups for the amino groups mostly used in the peptide synthesis are 9-fluorenylmethyloxycarbonyl group (Fmoc) and t-butyloxycarbonyl (Boc). A number of amino acids bear functional groups in the side chain which must be protected specifically from reacting with the incoming N-protected amino acids. In contrast to Boc and Fmoc groups, these have to be stable over the course of peptide synthesis although they are also removed during the final deprotection of peptides.

== Solid-phase synthesis of DNA and RNA ==
Relatively short fragments of DNA, RNA, and modified oligonucleotides are also synthesised by the solid-phase method. Although oligonucleotides can be synthesised in a flask, they are almost always synthesised on solid phase using a DNA/RNA synthesizer. For a more comprehensive review, see oligonucleotide synthesis. The method of choice is generally phosphoramidite chemistry, developed in the 1980s.

== See also ==
- Combinatorial chemistry
- Noncovalent solid-phase organic synthesis
