= Purdue Research Park =

Research park network in Indiana, United States

- Location: Indiana
- Coordinates: 40.46°N 86.93°W
- Affiliations: Purdue University

The Purdue Research Parks are a network of four research parks located in Indiana, United States. The 725-acre (2.93 km^{2}) flagship West Lafayette park is located less than 2 miles (3 km) north of Purdue University's West Lafayette campus, and is the largest university-affiliated research park in the United States. The other facilities are located in Merrillville, Indianapolis, and New Albany. The parks were developed by the Purdue Research Foundation.

Under development since the late 1990s, the Purdue Research Parks are now home to nearly 200 companies encompassing numerous industries and fields of study, including biology, materials science, and information science, among others. Purdue University and Purdue Research Foundation operate business incubation programs to assist organizations in the process of commercializing innovative technologies. It represents the largest cluster of "technology-based companies" in Indiana.

== Economic impact ==
Purdue Research Park has been used as an example of the positive "impact of scientific research" on local economies, specifically through citation of a report which detailed a positive financial impact of US$1,300,000,000 per annum for the state of Indiana and a positive jobs impact through creation of 4000 jobs.

== Locations ==
The network of four research park locations are referred to as Purdue Research Park of West Lafayette, Purdue Research Park of Indianapolis, Purdue Research Park of Northwest Indiana (Merrillville) and Purdue Research Park of Southeast Indiana (New Albany).

=== West Lafayette ===
The West Lafayette location was Indiana's "first designated certified technology park", a 725-acre (2.93 km^{2}) site employing more than 3,000 people as of 2012.

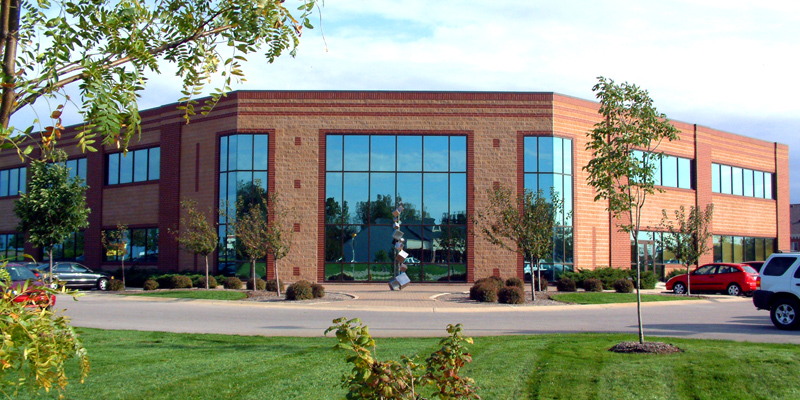
The Vistech 1 building.

As the largest university-affiliated, high-tech park in the United States, the West Lafayette Purdue Research Park is made up more than 50 distinct buildings. Key buildings include:

==== Incubation facilities ====
- Business and Technology Center
- Purdue Technology Center
- Herman and Heddy Kurz Purdue Technology Center

==== Graduation facilities ====
- International Technology Center
- Lakeview Technology Center
- Pritsker Building
- Ross Enterprise Center
- Vistech 1

==== Other affiliated facilities ====
- The Chao Center for Industrial Pharmacy & Contract Manufacturing
- Broadband Antenna Tracking Systems

==== Resident companies ====
- Arxan Technologies, Inc.
- Akina, Inc.
- Butler America Aerospace & Defense
- The Chao Center for Industrial Pharmacy & Contract Manufacturing
- Cook Biotech, Inc.
- CoVideo
- C-SPAN Archives
- Delphi E&S - Verification Lab
- Dow AgroSciences
- Endocyte
  Endocyte, a pharmaceutical company, is developing EC145 (Vintafolide), a candidate drug for use in chemotherapy-resistant patients with non-small-cell lung cancer. EC145 has undergone a Phase II clinical trial.
- FLIR Systems Inc.
- Imaginestics LLC
- Cook MED Institute
- Perfinity Biosciences
- Simulex Inc.
- Spensa Technologies (DTN)

=== Northwest Indiana ===
In 2013, the data management company Intercontinental Industries (operating as interLink) took up residence at the Northwest Indiana location.
