= Scoular =

American agricultural services company

Coordinates: 41.266°N 96.128°W

The Scoular Company
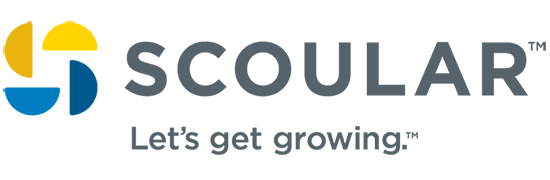
- Formerly: Scoular Grain Company, Scoular-Bishop Grain Co.
- Type: Private
- Industry: Agricultural commodities; Agricultural services
- Founded: 1892; 134 years ago, in Omaha, Nebraska
- Founder: George Scoular
- Headquarters: Omaha, Nebraska
- Number of locations: >100 (2024)
- Key people: Paul Maass (CEO); David Faith (chairman)
- Number of employees: >1000 (2024)
- Website: scoular.com

The Scoular Company (/ˈskuːlr/) is an American agricultural company based in Omaha, Nebraska dedicated to the buying, selling, storage, handling, and processing of grain, feed and food ingredients. The company was founded in 1892 by George Scoular and owned by the Scoular family until its purchase in 1967 by Omaha businessman Marshall Faith, who was CEO for the next 23 years. At the time of Faith's purchase Scoular had 10 employees and operated three grain elevators, but grew considerably over subsequent decades and is one of the largest grain storage and handling companies in North America. In 2021, Scoular ranked 16th on FoodTalks' Global Top 40 Plant Protein Companies list.

Scoular employs over 1,400 people at 22 offices and 112 storage, handling, and processing facilities, in North America and Asia. In 2024 Scoular reported $8 billion in sales and more than one billion bushels traded.

== Products and services ==
=== Grains and seeds ===
Scoular originates, stores, and markets a wide range of grains and seeds, including corn, soybeans, wheat, oats, barley, and specialty crops such as waxy corn and white corn. The company offers identity-preserved, organic, and non-GMO options to serve grain mills, food manufacturers, livestock producers, and pet food companies. Scoular ranks among the largest grain storage operators in North America, listed eighth in World Grain magazine's ranking of top North American grain companies by licensed storage capacity.

=== Biofuels ===
Scoular participates in the renewable fuels market through the origination and supply of feedstocks including fats, oils, and greases used to produce biodiesel, renewable diesel, and sustainable aviation fuel. In March 2023, Scoular announced it would convert a former sunflower crush plant in Goodland, Kansas into a dual oilseed processing facility for canola and soybeans, citing growing demand in the renewable diesel and sustainable aviation fuel markets. The Goodland Crush facility opened in October 2024 and is capable of processing 11 million bushels of oilseeds annually, producing vegetable oils for biofuel producers and protein meal for the animal feed market. The National Oilseed Processors Association (NOPA) recognized the Goodland facility at its ribbon-cutting ceremony in September 2024. Kansas State University partnered with Scoular to advise farmers on canola production to supply the facility.

=== Food ingredients ===
Scoular supplies food-grade ingredients to manufacturers in the food, beverage, and dietary supplement industries under its Scoular Food Innovation brand, launched in February 2023. Its portfolio includes plant-based proteins, fats and oils, lecithins, sweeteners, fibers, and starches with a focus on non-GMO and organic options. The company operates an in-house research and development team that helps customers develop and commercialize ingredient formulations.

=== Pet food ingredients ===
Scoular supplies ingredients to pet food manufacturers, including grains, proteins, marine ingredients, and nutritional supplements. The company has supplied ingredients to the pet food industry for more than 30 years.

In recent years, Scoular has continued to expand its Pet food ingredient portfolio. Through its Encompass brand, launched in 2021, Scoular operates one of the largest fishmeal and fish oil businesses globally, sourcing marine proteins from more than 40 countries. The company is the largest importer of fishmeal in the United States.

Additionally, in 2024, Scoular formed an exclusive partnership with Seadling, a Borneo-based seaweed biotechnology company, to supply fermented dried seaweed powder to North American pet food manufacturers as a functional ingredient.

=== Animal feed ingredients ===
Scoular sources and distributes ingredients for the animal feed industry, serving livestock producers in the dairy, beef, poultry, pork, and aquaculture markets. The company is recognized as a participant in the cattle feed and feed additives market. In 2023, Scoular announced a $20 million expansion of its feed blending facility in Jerome, Idaho, adding steamflaking and pellet mill capabilities to better serve dairy and beef producers in the region.

=== International trade ===
Scoular conducts international trade in agricultural commodities and ingredients, shipping to more than 80 countries. The company exports over 100,000 containers from the United States annually and operates facilities across North America and Asia to support its global distribution network.

=== Transportation ===
Scoular provides logistics and transportation services through its Scoular Global Shipping division. Services include freight forwarding, transloading, cross-docking, customs filings, marine cargo insurance, and domestic transport across container, truck, rail, and barge modes.

== Former subsidiaries ==
DTN, a Minneapolis-based agricultural data and analytics company, originated as a subsidiary of Scoular in 1984 before separating into an independent company under founder Roger Brodersen.

== Notable incidents ==
In 2015, Scoular was defrauded of $17.2 million in a spear phishing attack in which an actor impersonating CEO Chuck Elsea instructed a finance executive to wire funds to a bank account in China.
