= Telvent =

Information technology company

Telvent GIT S.A.
- Company type: Subsidiary
- Industry: Information Technology and Industrial Automation
- Founded: Seville, Spain (1941)
- Headquarters: Madrid, Houston, Beijing, Calgary, Baltimore, Mexico City and others
- Number of employees: 5,753 (2010)
- Parent: Getronics
- Website: www.telvent.com

Telvent (a portmanteau of "Telecom Ventures") was an information technology and industrial automation company specializing in SCADA, GIS and related IT systems for pipeline, energy utility, traffic, agriculture and environmental monitoring industries. Their customer base is worldwide, but concentrated in Spain and North America. In 2011, Telvent was acquired by the Schneider Electric group. In 2014 it was integrated into Getronics.

== See also ==
- Data Transmission Network (Telvent DTN)
- Abengoa
- Schneider Electric
