= Noncovalent solid-phase organic synthesis =

Noncovalent solid-phase organic synthesis (NC-SPOS) is a form of solid-phase synthesis whereby the organic substrate is bonded to the solid phase not by a covalent bond but by other chemical interactions.

== Synthesis ==
This bond may consist of an induced dipole interaction between a hydrophobic matrix and a hydrophobic anchor. As long as the reaction medium is hydrophilic (polar) in nature the anchor will remain on the solid phase. Switching to a nonpolar solvent releases the organic substrate containing the anchor.

In one experimental setup the hydrophobic matrix is RP silica gel (C_{18}) and the anchor is acridone. Acridone is N-alkylated and the terminal alkene group is converted into an aldehyde by ozonolysis. This compound is bonded to RP silica gel and this system is subjected to a tandem sequence of organic reactions. The first reaction is a Barbier reaction with propargylic bromide in water (green chemistry) and the second reaction is a Sonogashira coupling. Substrates may vary in these sequences and in this way a chemical library of new compounds can be realized.

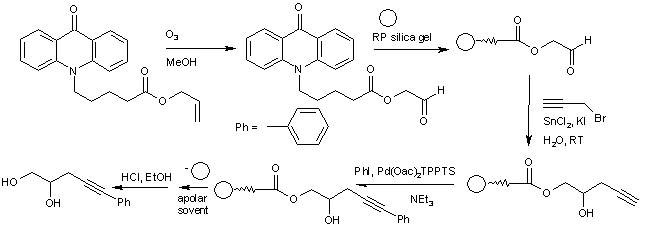
Noncovalent solid-phase organic synthesis

The phosphorus ligand in the Sonogashira coupling with phenyliodine is the water-soluble TPPTS ligand
