= DTN (company) =

American weather forecasting company

Coordinates: 44.7973°N 93.2564°W

- Formerly: Telvent DTN, Data Transmission Network, Dataline
- Type: Private
- Industry: Agriculture; Oil and gas; Trading; Weather
- Predecessor: Scoular Grain
- Founded: 1984; 42 years ago in Omaha, Nebraska
- Founder: Roger Brodersen
- Headquarters: Bloomington, Minnesota
- Number of locations: 18 (2018)
- Key people: Marc Chesover (president)
- Products: The Progressive Farmer, MyDTN, ProphetX, WeatherLine, weather stations
- Services: Data analysis, meteorological consulting, weather forecasting
- Owner: TBG AG
- Number of employees: 750 (2018)
- Website: dtn.com

DTN, previously known as Telvent DTN, Data Transmission Network and Dataline, is a private company based in Bloomington, Minnesota that specializes in subscription-based services for the analysis and delivery of real-time weather, agricultural, energy, and international trade markets information. As of 2018 the company has approximately 600,000 subscribers, mostly in the United States. DTN is known for its accurate meteorological forecasting and large network of weather stations, its market analysis services, and its early use of radio and satellite systems to transmit reports to its Midwestern consumers. DTN also operates The Progressive Farmer magazine. DTN was previously owned by Telvent and Schneider Electric, and since 2017 has been owned by Zürich-based TBG.

== History ==
=== Formation (1984–1987) ===
In the early 1980s the Omaha-based company Scoular Grain was a growing agribusiness led by Nebraska grain industry executive Marshall Faith. Faith, along with several other investors, had acquired what was then Scoular-Bishop Grain Company in 1967 and expanded its operations from three grain elevators to dozens of locations in multiple states, and was beginning to branch out beyond grain warehousing. On 9 April 1984 the company created a new subsidiary incorporated under the name Scoular Information Services with the goal of improving communications with farmers. The project was led by Omaha native Roger Brodersen, Scoular's chief operating officer and the executive who supervised new-project development and corporate acquisitions for the company. The subsidiary soon became known as Dataline.

Dataline's chief product was an FM radio receiver unit that would pick up Dataline broadcasts transmitted via sideband signals. Farmers and agribusinesses would buy the receivers to get agricultural information and commodities updates. Dataline's customers preferred to lease the receivers rather than buy them, but Scoular was unwilling to finance the equipment, so Brodersen bought Dataline in 1986 and a year later took its stock public in order to raise the capital necessary to acquire the receivers and to develop other information products. Under the new model, subscribers would receive a radio signal receiver and a video terminal at no charge, and then pay a monthly subscription to receive 24-hour-a-day broadcasts of 20+ pages of market information, weather reports, and analysis. In late 1986, the monthly fees were $17.50 and the service was available in Nebraska, Minnesota, Iowa, and Illinois. Public broadcasting station WILL-TV in Champaign was one broadcaster that carried the Dataline signal.

At the beginning of 1987 Dataline had 5,300 subscribers; that grew to 10,000 by May and 13,500 in ten states by October. In addition to being accessible on terrestrial FM carriers, Dataline was also broadcast from the Galaxy 1 communications satellite. Monthly fees were $19.50 for 65 videotext pages of market quotes, grain and livestock information, commentary, weather, and reports. In September, Dataline partnered with a subsidiary of ConAgra to add an "electronic catalog" feature to their information feed, allowing subscribers to browse farm supplies, equipment, and other products.

On 17 September 1987 the company re-incorporated and was renamed Data Transmission Network.

=== Expansion (1988–1997) ===
The company, commonly identified simply as DTN, expanded rapidly through the late 1980s and early 1990s; its operating cash flow grew roughly 30% each year beginning in 1989 and by 1993 was $12.9M. By mid-1994 DTN had roughly 77,000 subscribers, about 60,000 of which were in the agricultural sector; the remainder were mostly in the finance and energy industries. Subscriptions in 1994 were $26 a month; satellite connection was an extra $7/month and a color monitor an extra $20/month. By 1997 it had 152,000 customers, 110,000 of which were in agriculture.

Beginning in the mid-1990s DTN also grew its operations by acquiring other data and meteorology companies. In May 1996 it acquired its chief competitor FarmDayta (formerly Broadcast Partners) of Urbandale, Iowa for $73M, and adopted its 38,500 subscribers. In 1998 DTN merged its weather services division with Minneapolis-based Kavouras, a company founded in 1977 that specialized in radar-based weather reporting and prediction; DTN also acquired Weather Services Corporation (WSC), a Lexington, Massachusetts-based forecasting and climate prediction company that developed meteorological databases. The union of the three weather organizations became known as DTN/Meteorlogix.

The company also worked in the '90s to expand into niche markets by offering more specialized service offerings.

=== Sale and bankruptcy (1998–2003) ===
In the late 1990s, DTN entered a period of financial uncertainty, in part due to increasing competition with new free information channels like CNBC, the Weather Channel, and websites run by Farm Journal and Pioneer. In response, DTN sought to expand its customer base by selling a broader array of services, including inventory-tracking for auto dealers, coupon-printing kiosks for grocery stores, fire-alert information for forestry services, and other ventures. DTN gained 7,600 new subscribers but lost 4,500 from its core group of agricultural customers, and its stock fell 38% in 1999.

Since April 1998, DTN had been seeking an organization to buy the 1300-employee company, but after 11 months had not found anyone willing to pay a price that the board felt was appropriate, so in mid-March 1999 founder Roger Brodersen called off the search for a buyer. One week later on 24 March, Brodersen and four other directors resigned and Peter Kamin was named the new chairman. Kamin, the leader of a stockholders group that pressed to sell the company, resumed the search for a buyer.

In April 2000, the New York City-based private equity firm Veronis Suhler Stevenson agreed to buy out DTN for $451M, including $91M in debt. DTN at the time had approximately 166,000 clients. Veronis implemented a new strategy by splitting DTN into four separate divisions: agriculture, energy, weather, and financial services. Robert Gordon, who would later become DTN CEO, was hired to run the weather division.

Staffing up the four divisions proved slow and costly, and by 2003 sales were lower than in 1998. DTN entered Chapter 11 bankruptcy in late 2003 and its operation was taken over by a consortium of banks led by Wachovia, DTN's lead creditor. DTN emerged from bankruptcy six weeks later.

=== Revival (2004–2007) ===
Robert Gordon became president in January and CEO in July 2004. He gradually reduced staff to 675, eliminated redundancies, and pushed a new strategy of selling proprietary data at a premium price. Customers paid larger subscription fees ($100 a month for many weather customers) to receive customized, hourly webcasts based on more precise computer models; ag customers paid roughly 50% more for analyses of issues like Asian soybean rust and avian influenza; and energy customers gained access to online exchanges with real-time fuel prices.

Gordon's strategy proved successful and DTN began to re-expand. In July 2006 DTN acquired St. Louis-based Surface Systems, Inc. (SSI), a company specializing in weather monitors for roads and airport runways, and integrated its customers and its network of 6000 surface sensors into its Meteorlogix division. In 2007 it acquired the majority of the Edmond, Oklahoma company WeatherBank, integrating its energy, transportation, public safety, and agriculture weather forecasting customers into Meteorlogix.

In 2007, DTN also arranged with publisher Time Warner to acquire The Progressive Farmer, an agricultural magazine founded in 1886 and read at the time of acquisition by approximately 600,000 subscribers. The deal for an undisclosed sum supported Time Warner's strategy of shedding smaller publications to focus on its larger magazine properties and DTN's mission of providing agricultural information.

DTN remained structured around four brands: DTN Ag, DTN Energy, DTN Market Access, and DTN Meteorlogix.

=== Telvent and Schneider (2008–2016) ===
On 28 October 2008, Madrid-based IT company Telvent acquired DTN in a $445M all-cash deal. DTN at the time of the acquisition had about 700 employees, 700,000 subscribers, and annual revenues of approximately $180M, with about 90% of its sales derived from its subscription-based services. After its acquisition the company became known as Telvent DTN.

Telvent itself was purchased in 2011 by Schneider Electric, a large energy management company based in Rueil-Malmaison, France. Schneider announced in early 2011 that it had reached a deal to acquire Telvent, and in August received regulatory approval to complete the €1.4B acquisition. Telvent DTN's revenue at the time of the acquisition was approximately $213 million.

In June 2014 DTN acquired RevCo, a St. Louis-based agricultural data management business.

=== TBG and recent growth (2017–) ===
DTN logo circa 2017.

In 2016 Schneider put DTN up for sale after a strategic review found that it wasn't essential to the company. Several firms were interested in purchasing DTN (including London-based Euromoney Institutional Investor), but it was Zürich-based private investment holding TBG that ultimately purchased DTN and in April 2017 completed its acquisition of the company for $900M.

Since its purchase by TBG, DTN has acquired several smaller corporations or systems:

- Wilkens Weather (acquired 29 September 2017), a marine weather forecasting company based in Houston, Texas and previously owned by Rockwell Collins.
- Spensa Technologies (acquired 2 April 2018), a precision agriculture technology company founded in January 2009 and based in the Purdue Research Park in West Lafayette, Indiana.
- Energy Management Institute (acquired 10 April 2018), a provider of training services and marketing analysis based in New York City.
- Weather Decision Technologies (acquired 8 October 2018), a provider of weather decision support solutions based in Norman, Oklahoma.
- PraxSoft (acquired 10 June 2019), previously Praxis Software, a provider of sensor interfaces and communications technology based in Orlando, Florida.
- Weatherzone (acquired 1 October 2019), a weather information provider based in Australia.
- ClearAg and ClearPath (acquired May 2020 for $12M), a system created by California-based Iteris for monitoring and predicting agricultural conditions and Winter Road Maintenance.
- Farm Market iD (acquired February 2021), a provider of aggregated farm and grower data based in Westmont, Illinois.
- Online Fuels (acquired May 2021), a UK-based online trading platform for refined fuels.

MeteoGroup, a private Europe-based weather organisation acquired by parent TBG in September 2018, has been integrated into DTN.

== Business sectors ==
=== Aviation ===
DTN is one of the main suppliers of weather intelligence to the aviation industry. DTN's weather data and patented algorithms for EDR Turbulence, Icing and (Rapid Developing) Thunderstorms flow directly to airlines and airports or via one of DTN's many partners for Electronic Flight Bags(EFB) and Flight Planning. The data helps keeping crew and passengers safe in the air, especially around turbulence and thunderstorms events. DTN is delivering weather intelligence directly or indirectly to over 250 airlines worldwide. DTN has a large team of Aviation meteorologists in-house who support Aviation customers with (risk)consulting and creating e.g. RAMTAFs.

=== Agriculture ===
DTN's agricultural division sells services to farmers and agribusinesses.

- For farmers and other producers, DTN provides ag market information, insights on market prices and strategies, and detailed weather information and forecasts. DTN also creates applications used by growers to determine the best time to work fields or spray for pests, and offers Adapt-N-based field nitrogen analysis and planning.
- For agribusinesses DTN offers market information and analysis, tools to manage grain trading and communications with growers, weather reports, and other services.

Since 2007 DTN has owned and operated The Progressive Farmer, a 600,000-circulation farm and agribusiness magazine founded in 1886. DTN serves about 50,000 growers in North America and most leading agribusinesses.

=== Weather ===
DTN generates weather reports, forecasts, and analysis aimed at consumers in seven sectors: aviation, marine, utilities, renewable energy, transportation, sports, and construction/public safety. Forecasts and reports are based on large data sets that combine proprietary information from DTN's network of 6,000 weather stations with other global content sources. One such source is DTN Services and Systems Spain, where D-ATIS and D-VOLMET systems are manufactured for the company. Combining the various data into a single forecast is done in part through the National Center for Atmospheric Research's Dynamic Integrated foreCast (DICast), a technology licensed from the University Corporation for Atmospheric Research. DTN employs 120+ professional meteorologists in strategic locations globally.

The company's forecasts were ranked as the most accurate in the US each year since 2006 for predictions of short-term precipitation and high temperatures. WeatherSentry Online is DTN Weather's principal platform.

In October 2024 a technical fault affecting the supplying of data to the United Kingdom's BBC Weather service caused the latter's website and app to incorrectly forecast wind speeds of over 15,000 mph (24,000 km/h) and air temperatures exceeding 400 °C (750 °F).

=== Oil and gas ===
In the energy sector DTN focuses on the buying, selling, transportation, and storage of fuel. DTN offers real-time fuel market data, tools to monitor how fuel is distributed, and software for managing and automating fuel storage.

=== Trading ===
Energy trading, and commodity markets are the focus of DTN's trading division. DTN sells streaming market data, tickers, news, historical analysis, stock and option quotes, and other related services. Its principal trading-related product is ProphetX, a software platform built for commodity and equity markets.

== Products and services ==
=== Applications ===
DTN sells subscriptions to software applications which it makes available through web-based and mobile application platforms. For agriculture, DTN's primary application is MyDTN, an "agriculture application suite" that provides a variety of news, weather, and market information, as well as tools for calculating field nitrogen levels and farm profits. Other applications in the agriculture sector are:

- DTN Ag Weather Tools, an iOS and Android app for weather updates, alerts, and information
- DTN Connect, a web-based CRM tool
- DTN Grain Portal, a web-based tool for managing grain transactions

For weather, DTN's principal application is WeatherSentry which it licenses in various editions tailored to specific markets. Other DTN weather applications:

- AviationSentry, which provides aviation-related weather reports on thunderstorms, turbulence, icing risk, etc.
- Flight Route Alerting, with editions for airlines or helicopters
- MetConsole, a web-based software for managing weather sensors and networks, available in versions tailored to AWOS, ATIS, LLWAS, and regional networks
- RoadCast for road conditions
- Total View RWIS Data Management System

For fuel and energy, DTN markets applications mostly to refineries and large fuel suppliers and buyers. Applications include:

- DTN Allocation Tracker for fuel buyers to see where fuel is available
- DTN Allocation Viewer for fuel sellers to monitor their inventory
- DTN FastRacks for giving real-time fuel prices to buyers
- DTN Fuel Admin for managing electronic bills of lading
- DTN Fuel Buyer for monitoring market conditions and prices
- DTN DataConnect Messaging for back-office document management
- DTN TABS (Terminal Authorization and Billing System) for large sellers to manage loading at their terminals
- DTN TIMS (Terminal Inventory Management System) for large sellers to manage supply and inventory
- DTN Exchange for managing and selling fuel supplies
- DTN Guardian3, a terminal automation system

For trading, DTN's principal application is ProphetX, an application for market data and analysis which it sells in customized editions for commodities, energy, or livestock trading. ProphetX is accessible online and via an iOS or Android app. Other DTN trading applications:

- DTN IQFeed, which provides streaming quotes for stocks, options, and futures
- DTN.IQ, similar to IQFeed but with more analytics

=== Services ===
- Meteorological consulting for airlines, airports, helicopter operators, renewable energy companies, utilities, transportation, and sports.
- DTN AgHost, a service that creates branded websites for ag clients to better communicate with their customers.

=== Hardware ===
DTN sells automated weather stations that can be set up at a member's location to collect local meteorological data, which DTN then uses to produce hyper-local reports and forecasts. Roughly 5,500 stations operate from DTN member farms, part of the company's larger 22,500-station North American weather station network.

DTN also has a Weather Systems group based in Spain and the Netherlands that installs airport weather systems.

=== The Progressive Farmer ===
Since 2007 DTN has owned and operated The Progressive Farmer, a monthly magazine founded in 1886 that focuses on how to operate a successful farm by covering subjects like marketing, management, crop and livestock production, and equipment. The magazine has a national circulation of about 500,000 and is based in Birmingham, Alabama.

=== Past products ===
The original radio receivers and video display terminals used to receive DTN broadcasts are now obsolete, but older equipment remains in service in some areas. DTN terminals would display information on a page-by-page basis, and supported the optional attachment of a line printer to create hard copy reports. The basic package contained 40 pages of information, including charts, commentary, news, futures quotes, and weather; the subscription price in 1986 was $210/year.

== Operations ==
=== Locations ===
DTN is headquartered at offices on Lindau Lane in Bloomington, Minnesota. DTN also operates from its original location on West Dodge Road in Omaha, Nebraska. The company has satellite offices in a number of other US cities:

- Birmingham, Alabama – location of The Progressive Farmer magazine, acquired in 2007.
- Chicago, Illinois
- Springfield, Illinois
- Urbandale, Iowa – location of FarmDayta, acquired in 1996.
- St. Louis, Missouri – location of RevCo, acquired in 2014.
- Hastings, Nebraska
- New York, New York – location of Energy Management Institute, acquired in 2018.
- Plano, Texas – location of Diamond Control Systems, acquired in 2001.
- Houston, Texas – location of Wilkens Weather, acquired in 2017.
- Norman, Oklahoma – Location of WDT
- Grand Forks, North Dakota – Location of the Weather and Agriculture Division of Iteris, acquired in early May 2020
- Sydney, Australia – Location of Weatherzone, acquired 1 October 2019

In Europe, DTN has offices in Aberdeen, Antwerp, Utrecht, Madrid, and Seville. It also operates an Australian office in Brisbane.

== Corporate governance ==
DTN is organized into three divisions: DTN Weather, DTN Agriculture and DTN Energy.

=== Executives ===
Since 14 July 2020 the position of President for DTN has been held by Marc Chesover. Other members of DTN's leadership:

- Lars Ewe – Chief Technology Officer
- Doug Bennett – Chief Customer and Strategy Officer
- Marc Norton – Chief Information Security Officer

=== Previous CEOs ===
- Steve Matthesen, CEO (June 2019—July 2020)
- Ron Sznaider, acting CEO (November 2018—June 2019)
- Jerre Stead and Sheryl von Blucher, co-CEOs. (January 2018—November 2018)
- Kip Pendleton (October 2017—January 2018)
- Ron Sznaider (January 2016—September 2017)

=== Board of directors ===
- Marc Chesover – President
- Tom Dilworth – Chief financial officer
