= Advanced traveller information system =

An Advanced Traveller Information System (ATIS) is any system that acquires, analyzes, and presents information to assist surface transportation travellers in moving from a starting location (origin) to their desired destination. An ATIS may operate through information supplied entirely within the vehicle (autonomous system) or it can also use data supplied by the traffic management centres. Relevant information may include locations of incidents, weather and road conditions, optimal routes, recommended speeds, and lane restrictions, all part of the Intelligent transportation system or ITS.

== Types of systems ==
The various types of systems are public, private, or a combination and can be provided free, through user subscriptions, or third-party sponsorship. Delivery of ATIS can be by television, radio, computer, cell phone that includes mapping, 5-1-1 (US), Text messaging using SMS information systems, automobile through in-vehicle information systems, Variable-message signs, as well as any other means of communication, received as personal or mass communications before, during, and after traveling. Kiosks may be located at airports, bus stations, subways, or tourist locations.

== Countries ==
Advanced Traveler Information System's, in one form or another, are used in many countries around the world under various names.

- Australia: Uses Smartraveller provided by the Australian government, through the Australian Department of Foreign Affairs and trade, and provides worldwide travel information as well as travel warnings.
- United States: In 2003 the Federal Highway Administration, through the Office of International Programs, visited Spain, Germany, Sweden, Scotland, and England, that already had traveler information products and services covering all modes of transportation, to examine European practices before implementing the "511" telephone traveler information system.
- Portugal: As part of the "Special EU Programmes Body", Atlantic Area Trans-national Programme, implemented START that incorporates the network manager Integra. The system includes the search engine Rome2rio.
- Iran: This system, named "Radio-Payam" in Tehran, Iran, broadcasts traffic reports, including descriptions of overall traffic conditions on the main corridors, traffic jam location and their clearance, and recommended alternative routes.

== See also ==
- Drivebc
- Integrated Transport Information System (used in Malaysia)
