= George Cowling =

British weatherman (1920–2009)

George Cowling (2 March 1920 – 24 December 2009) was the BBC's first television weatherman. Cowling joined the Met Office in 1939 and worked as a forecaster for the RAF before joining the BBC in 1954. On 11 January 1954, he gave the first televised weather broadcast. He continued to present televised weather broadcasts for the BBC until 1957 when he rejoined the RAF. He later worked at the Met Office College and at Heathrow Airport before retiring from the Met Office in 1981.

== First weatherman ==
Cowling joined the Met Office in 1939, at the start of World War II, stationed as a meteorological assistant with No. 4 Bomber Group RAF in Yorkshire, and worked as a forecaster for the RAF, working in Britain, Normandy, Belgium, the Netherlands and Germany until 1953. In 1954 he was transferred to the London Weather Centre. On 11 January 1954, at the age of 33, Cowling gave the first televised weather forecast, from the BBC's Lime Grove Studios, at 7:55 pm. The forecast was live and 'in vision', with Cowling standing in front of the weather map, using a pencil and rubber to show the weather for the next day. He informed the viewing public that "tomorrow would be rather windy, a good day to hang out the washing".

The first ever dedicated weather presentation, featuring Cowling, was given five minutes, rather than the previous few seconds, and the bulletin was described in the Radio Times:

"From Monday onwards the television weather report and forecast will be presented by a Meteorological Office forecaster who will explain and comment on the charts shown. The change is designed to stress the continuity of the reports provided; the forecaster will show, for example, how the weather expected tomorrow is conditioned by the weather experienced today."

== Career ==
Cowling continued to present the weather bulletins for the BBC until 1957, alongside Tom Clifton. In February 1957, he joined RAF Bomber Command. He operated in Singapore, Malta, Bahrain and Germany, before leaving the RAF to work as a senior instructor at the Met Office College, and then as principal forecaster at Heathrow Airport.

== Retirement ==
In 1981, Cowling retired from the Met Office, and worked for five years for a marine engineering firm, as a meteorology consultant before retiring. His hobbies included golf – he was a member of Burnham Beeches Golf Club, as were his former fellow BBC weathermen, Jack Scott and Bert Foord. He lived in Marlow, Buckinghamshire, in the former Wycombe District.

He died on Christmas Eve 2009 after a short stay in hospital.
