= Weather presenter =

Person who presents the weather forecast on television

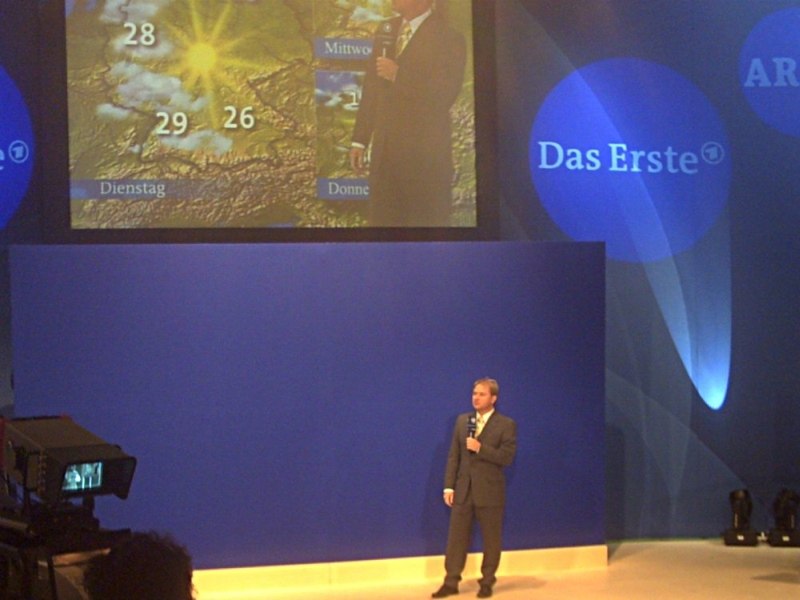
- Weather presenter making his description in front of a blue screen.

Occupation
- Synonyms: Weathercaster, weatherman, weather broadcaster
- Activity sectors: Mass media, meteorology

Description
- Fields of employment: Broadcasting
- Related jobs: Radio host, television presenter

A weather presenter (also known as a weather girl, weatherman or weather broadcaster) is a person who presents the weather forecast daily on radio, television or internet news broadcasts.

Using tools such as projected weather maps, they inform the viewers of the current and future weather conditions, explain underlying reasons, and relay weather hazards and warnings issued for their region, country or larger areas.

A weather presenter is not necessarily qualified as a meteorologist. Preparation to become a weather presenter varies by country and media. It can range from an introduction to meteorology for a television host to a diploma in meteorology from a recognized university.

== History ==
The United States was the first country in which television channels began broadcasting weather reports in the late 1940s, but presenters were doing it on radio well before then. From newsletters of the US Weather Bureau (now the National Weather Service), the host of a program traced the depressions, fronts and lows, mentioned in the general situation, and read the forecast. Thus, the host of a popular morning show, NBC's Today show, was chatting live with the Bureau's meteorologist. As the weather report became very popular, national television networks hired professional meteorologists to distinguish themselves from their competitors, but in the early 1960s the "weather girl" era began. Women presenters were seen by broadcast managers as more pleasant to watch and advertised for local shops by wearing brand-name clothing. In the early 1960s, Dianne White Clatto became the first African-American weathercaster in the United States.

In 1981, John Coleman, the former head meteorologist for WLS-TV in Chicago, then later Good Morning America, proposed a national weather forecasting network to Frank Batten, the owner of the Virginia newspaper and broadcasting chain Landmark Communications. The latter had realized that many of his readers were buying the newspaper for the weather forecast, and he jumped on the idea. After ten months to find funding and build the infrastructure, The Weather Channel (TWC) began broadcasting on May 2, 1982 from Atlanta, Georgia. This was the first television channel to broadcast weather forecasts 24 hours a day, using a full staff of general meteorologists and other weather specialists.

In Canada, the first presenter on television was Percy Saltzman, a professional meteorologist, who launched the regular news bulletins on the English-language Canadian Broadcasting Corporation in 1952. Canada's weather bulletins have developed similarly to those in the United States. However, it is less common to see on-screen meteorologists, and networks invest much less in meteorological equipment, depending on the observations of the Meteorological Service of Canada. On the French-speaking side, Jacques Lebrun at Télé-Métropole, a self-educated presenter, was the most well-known of the earliest weathermen of the 1970s and '80s. The Weather Network, similar to TWC, went live on September 1, 1988, but it uses mostly news persons as presenters.

Other countries have followed similar paths. For instance, the first broadcast of the weather on French television dates back to December 17, 1946 and was presented by Paul Douchy in the Téléjournal program. The forecasters of National Meteorology (now Météo-France) commented live, once a week, with a weather map of the time scheduled for the next day on the RTF. In February 1958, France became one of the first countries to broadcast a daily weather report on television, after the United States, Canada and Great Britain (BBC began broadcasting in October 1954).

== Presentation techniques ==
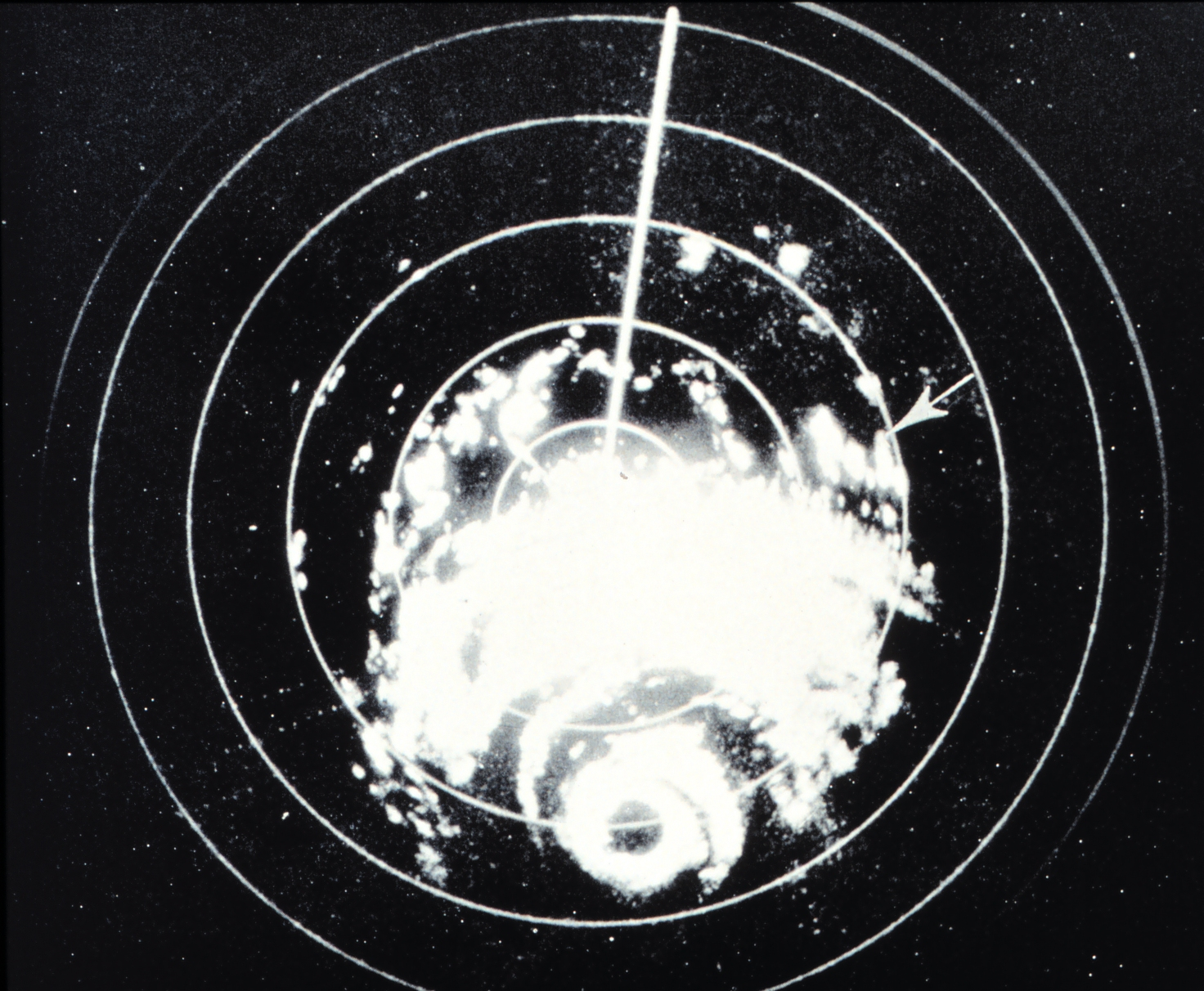
Radar image of hurricane Carla

Presentation techniques have varied greatly since the beginning of television and radio. The first bulletins were mostly a reading of the forecast issued by the local national weather service. With the advent of television, this was accompanied by preset charts or drawn on blackboard by the presenter. Gradually, standard maps with icons to describe the weather were adopted everywhere. In the 1960s, weather radar and meteorological satellites appeared and their images were incorporated into weather forecasts as still images. For instance, the first use of weather radar on television in the United States was in September 1961 when Hurricane Carla was approaching the state of Texas and local Reporter Dan Rather convinced the local US Weather Bureau staff to let him broadcast live from their office showing the radar data with a rough overlay of the Gulf of Mexico on a transparent sheet of plastic. His report helped the alerted population accepting the evacuation of an estimated 350,000 people by the authorities, saving several thousand lives.

The development of video and computers made it possible to create interactive presentations. Among other things, the overlay, made on the fly, allows the presenter to make a description of the time in front of a blue or green monochromatic screens, and the technical section adds the maps to the editing. These can be animation loops of satellite images, radar or lightning detection, simulations of the expected evolution of clouds, pressure fields, rain or snow zones, etc. They can even insert videos of a meteorological event that makes the headline or any other interesting graphic. Computer companies even specialize in the production of computer graphics for meteorology and incorporate analyzes usually reserved for professional meteorologists such as tornado storm analysis and tropical cyclones. Content adapted to several clienteles are also offered from children to adult audiences.

== Certification programs ==
In North America, the American Meteorological Society, the National Weather Association and the Canadian Meteorological and Oceanographic Society have a presenter certification program. On the American side, a degree in meteorology is needed and a committee evaluates their skills and experiences before giving accreditation. On the Canadian side, the diploma can be replaced by work experience and knowledge. This certification gives some notoriety in the public eye but is not mandatory to become a presenter.

== Public perception ==
Several anecdotes circulate about the work of the weather presenters which are often the target of jokes. There are even a few movies and TV series that have a character from this profession, among them:

- Groundhog Day (film), a 1993 comedy film by Harold Ramis featuring Bill Murray and Andie MacDowell.
- To Die For, a 1995 film by Gus Van Sant with Nicole Kidman.
- Lucky Numbers, a 2000 film loosely inspired by the 1980 Pennsylvania Lottery scandal starring John Travolta, whose protagonist also served as the station's weather presenter.
- The Weather Man, a 2005 American comedy-drama film directed by Gore Verbinski, and starring Nicolas Cage.
- Weather Girl, a 2009 comedy film written and directed by Blayne Weaver and starring Tricia O'Kelley, Mark Harmon, Jon Cryer, and Enrico Colantoni.
- John Kettley Is a Weatherman was a novelty single by the band A Tribe of Toffs which namechecked many British weather presenters. It reached number 21 in the UK Singles Chart in 1988.

== Famous personalities ==
- Dianne White Clatto was the first African-American weathercaster in the United States
- Peter Coade has the longest career as a weather broadcaster at 54 years. He started with the Meteorological Service of Canada on October 1, 1962 and ended his career at CBC Halifax, Canada, Nova Scotia on September 30, 2016
- Dick Goddard has the longest career as a TV weather presenter at 51 years 6 days (September 13, 1965 to September 19, 2016).
