= A Tribe of Toffs =

English novelty pop band

- Origin: Sunderland, England
- Genres: Pop
- Years active: 1986–1990
- Past members: Stephen Cousins - Guitars, vocals Andrew Stephenson - Bass, guitars, vocals Michael 'Motch' Haggerton - Guitar, vocals Philip Rodgers - Drums, percussion, vocals

A Tribe of Toffs were a novelty pop band from Sunderland, England, best remembered for their 1988 Top 40 single, "John Kettley is a Weatherman".

The band was formed in 1986 by four pupils from Bede Comprehensive School in Sunderland. They were noticed after sending a tape of their songs to children's TV presenter Andy Crane. The producer of Children's BBC's But First This, Paul Smith, liked the tape and arranged for the band to come down to London in July 1988 to record the song at the BBC's Maida Vale Studios. The following month the four were back in London to record the video, at the warehouse just across the road from BBC Television Centre, where Who Framed Roger Rabbit had just been filmed. The band went on to make appearances on Wogan, Daytime Live (with Alan Titchmarsh) and various Children's BBC appearances, as well as some satellite TV shows. The single went to number 21 in the UK Singles Chart in December 1988. It may be recalled for its video featuring TV weatherman John Kettley in person.

Following "the bloody Kettley record" (as the band were later to call it), the band were keen to release some more serious songs but were unable to secure a recording contract. They decided to release a second humorous single in 1989 called "Terry Wogan's On TV (Again)" but it did not chart.

The band split in 1990 and retired from the music industry.

On 19 July 2022 (the hottest day recorded in the UK), Radio X DJ Chris Moyles played ‘John Kettley is a Weather Man’ on his show and subsequently ‘campaigned’ for his listeners to buy it and it reached number 1 in the UK iTunes chart.
