= Bernard Davey =

British meteorologist

Bernard Davey (born 29 March 1943) is a retired British weather forecaster and television presenter.

Davey was born in Belfast in 1943. He was educated at St Kevin's Primary School and St Mary's CBS in the city.

After moving to England, he joined the Meteorological Office in 1962 to train as a weather observer. He was subsequently posted to various locations around the UK and overseas, including two years in Tobruk in the late 1960s and three years at RAF Laarbruch in Germany, before returning to take charge of weather observation at RAF Lyneham in 1978. In 1985 he moved to the London Weather Centre where he continued to work as a forecaster, being appointed as the BBC's 32nd weather forecast presenter in March 1987.

Davey worked as one of a team of five weather presenters from April 1987 to January 1993. The following year he was diagnosed with Multiple Sclerosis and took early retirement at the age of 50. He and his wife Teresa then moved back to Northern Ireland and settled in Newcastle, County Down. In 1999 he published a book about the local landscape entitled Bernard Davey's Mourne: Ten Walks with the Weatherman; a further volume was published two years later.
