= Michael Fish =

British weather forecaster (born 1944)

Michael Fish MBE FRMetS
- Fish in 1994
- Born: 27 April 1944 (age 82); Eastbourne, Sussex, England
- Education: Eastbourne College; City University London
- Occupation: Meteorologist
- Years active: 1962–2016; 2022
- Employer: Met Office
- Television: BBC
- Spouse: Susan Fish (m. 1968)
- Children: 2
- Awards: TRIC Award
- Website: michael-fish.com

Michael Fish (born 27 April 1944) is a British weather forecaster. From 1974 to 2004, he was a television presenter for BBC Weather.

== Career ==
Fish was born on 27 April 1944 in Eastbourne, Sussex. Educated at Osmington School then Eastbourne College and City University London, Fish was the longest-serving broadcast meteorologist on British television. He joined the Met Office in 1962 and started on BBC Radio in 1971, moving to the role on television in 1974.

Fish was appointed a Member of the Order of the British Empire (MBE) in the 2004 Birthday Honours. He retired in 2004, and made his final forecast on 6 October on the BBC Ten O'Clock News bulletin. In a specially extended report, fellow forecaster Ian McCaskill paid tribute to Fish, saying that "Michael is the last of the true weathermen you will ever see. Michael can actually interpret the skies – he can do the weather forecast the hard way: the old way that people don't do any more, because nowadays most of the decisions are made by the computer."

Fish co-authored a book with Paul Hudson and Ian McCaskill called Storm Force: Britain's Wildest Weather, published in October 2007. He was awarded honorary degrees by City University London in 1996 and the University of Exeter in summer 2005.

More than eight years after retiring from the BBC national forecasts team, he made a return to regular forecasting, presenting a weekly weather forecast for Netweather.tv. He resumed forecasting on BBC South East Today, providing holiday cover for the regular forecaster and has also taken to acting. He is a patron of numerous organisations and charities. He has since retired from presenting his weekly forecast on Netweather.tv as announced on 24 December 2021.

== Hurricane controversy ==
A few hours before the Great Storm of 1987 broke, on 15 October 1987, Fish said during a televised weather forecast: "Earlier on today, apparently, a woman rang the BBC and said she heard there was a hurricane on the way. Well, if you're watching, don't worry, there isn't!". This was seen as heavily downplaying the expected severity of the storm, which was in fact the worst to hit South East England for three centuries, causing record damage and killing 19 people.

In later years, Fish claimed that he had been referring to that year's Atlantic Hurricane Floyd affecting the Florida Keys at the time, in a link to a news story in the BBC One O'Clock News that preceded the weather bulletin. However, he did not mention Florida in the forecast, which was made amid widespread worries about a coming storm: that morning, the Surrey Mirror had warned of "furious gales". He did go on to warn of high winds for the UK, although the storm that actually occurred was far stronger than he had predicted, albeit technically not a hurricane. 15 years later he commented that if he were given a penny for every mention of that episode of The Weather, he would be a millionaire. In 2012, a clip of the bulletin was shown as part of a video montage in the London 2012 Summer Olympics opening ceremony.

In reaction to the controversy, the term "the Michael Fish effect" has been coined, whereby British weather forecasters are now inclined to predict "a worst-case scenario in order to avoid being caught out". The term "Michael Fish moment" is applied to public forecasts, on any topic, which turn out to be embarrassingly wrong.

In a 2012 BBC interview, Fish claimed that, contrary to his prior statements, the woman caller did not actually exist, despite a number of women claiming to be her over the years. It was, he claimed, a white lie he made up himself. According to Fish, a colleague in the studio had mentioned that his mother, who lived in Wales, was going to Florida, and was worried about whether it would be safe to travel with Hurricane Floyd being active. Fish claims that he thought it would be a good opening line to start off the weather forecast, and so invented the caller as a means to work it in.

== Personality and popular culture ==
Fish had a record dedicated to him in 1985 by the punk group Rachel and Nicki called "I wish, I wish, he was like Michael Fish". This was featured on Wogan.

In 2012, Fish worked with a fashion company to coordinate a BASE jump from a block of flats in central London to raise awareness of climate change.

In 2017, Fish partnered with Fullers Brewery for a campaign called #Whenitrainsitpours which gave Twitter followers a free pint of London Pride each time it rained in London.

Fish lives in Twickenham, south western Greater London.

Fish married Susan Fish in 1968 and they then had two daughters, Alison Fish (born 9 May 1971) and Nicola Fish (born 25 November 1975). Alison Fish went on to have a daughter, Madeleine Murphy (born 2 November 2010), and Nicola Fish a son, Rufus McClean (born 16 November 2016).

== Other television appearances ==
Fish appeared on dozens of other television programmes, ranging from scientific broadcasts to comedy shows and quizzes. He made a cameo in ITV prison drama Bad Girls' 2005 Christmas special, in which he played himself as a weatherman downplaying the severity of a snow storm. He was on BBC Two's game show Identity on 3 September 2007 as a TV weather forecaster. On 14 October 2007, he appeared on Radio 4's Sunday news review Broadcasting House as a guest newspaper reviewer and delivered the weather forecast at the end of the programme.

To commemorate the 20th anniversary of the Great Storm, Fish returned to deliver the weather forecast on the BBC's One O'clock and Six O'clock news on 15 October 2007.

On 18 July 2022, Fish appeared live in the studio on BBC2's Newsnight for a discussion about the heatwave implications with presenter Kirsty Wark. Fish repeated he had been advocating more use of nuclear energy since the 1970s and had not changed his view.
