= Bill Giles (meteorologist) =

British weather forecaster (born 1939)

William George Giles OBE (born 18 November 1939) is a retired British weather forecaster and television presenter.

== Early life ==
Bill Giles was born in Dittisham, near Dartmouth, Devon, England, and first became interested in meteorology whilst at Queen Elizabeth's Grammar School in Crediton. He joined the Met Office in January 1957 on leaving Bristol College of Science and Technology (which later became the University of Bath in 1965).

== Career ==
From 1961 to 1963, he was based in Germany as an observer with the RAF and from 1968 to 1970, worked as a lecturer at the Met Office's training college.

His broadcasting career began in 1972 when he transferred to the London Weather Centre. In 1980, promotion took him back to Bracknell where he worked in public relations. On the retirement of Jack Scott (in 1983), he returned to lead BBC Television's Met Office forecasting team.

In 1999, he was accused of bullying weathermen/women at the Weather Centre. Although at first found guilty by the Met Office, on appeal, he was cleared of all wrongdoing.

He retired from the Met Office in January 2000 after having led the team of Broadcast Meteorologists since 1983.

He is also a member of the International Association of Broadcast Meteorology (IABM).

== Personal life ==
He married Eileen Lake in 1961 in Devon, but divorced in 1991. They have a son (born 1969) and daughter (born 1971). In May 1993, he married Patricia Stafford in Bullingdon, Oxfordshire. He currently resides in Oxfordshire. Prior to the early 1990s, he lived in Chalfont St Giles in the former Chiltern District of Buckinghamshire.

He was appointed OBE in 1995.

He is a keen exponent of lawn bowls. In May 2011, he was involved in a BBC Breakfast news clip which focused on recruiting younger people to the sport.
