= TBG AG =

Private investment firm based in Zürich, Switzerland

Coordinates: 47.3673°N 8.5377°E

- Company type: Private
- Industry: Private Equity
- Founded: September 2014; 11 years ago
- Headquarters: Zürich, Switzerland
- Area served: Worldwide
- Key people: Christoph von Grolman (Executive Chairman); Jeremy Abson (CEO)

TBG AG (Thyssen-Bornemisza Group; /ˈtiːsɪn bɔːrnəˈmit.sə/), is a private investment firm based in Zürich, Switzerland. The company is the investment arm of the Thyssen-Bornemisza family TBG's CEO is Jeremy Abson.

Associated entities include TBG Holdings (Bermuda), Favorita Investment (Malta), Conscientia Investment (Malta), TBG Limited, and Urvanos Investments Limited.

== Holdings and acquisitions ==
In April 2017 TBG acquired US-based weather and data analytics firm DTN, purchasing it from Schneider Electric for approximately $900M.

In September 2018 it acquired Netherlands-based weather company MeteoGroup for an undisclosed sum.

Subsidiary TBG Holdings purchased a majority stake in Italian valve maker Petrolvalves in 2015.
