= Kimberley Nixon =

British actress (born 1985)

- Born: 24 September 1985 (age 41); Bristol, England
- Education: Royal Welsh College of Music & Drama
- Occupation: Actress
- Years active: 2007–present
- Television: Fresh Meat; Hebburn
- Spouse: Cai Howells
- Children: 1

Kimberley Nixon (born 24 September 1985) is a British actress. Nixon is known for her role as Sophy Hutton in the BBC One period drama Cranford, and appearances in various films such as Wild Child, Angus, Thongs and Perfect Snogging, Easy Virtue, Cherrybomb and Black Death. She also starred as Josie Jones in the Channel 4 comedy-drama Fresh Meat and as Sarah Pearson in the BBC Two comedy Hebburn.

== Early life and education ==
Born in Bristol to Welsh parents, Nixon and her six brothers were raised in Ynysybwl near Pontypridd, Wales, where she attended Coedylan Comprehensive School, now known as Pontypridd High School.

After high school, Nixon trained at the Royal Welsh College of Music & Drama in Cardiff alongside Tom Cullen and Aneurin Barnard. Before her graduation in 2007, she signed to Universal Studios after appearing in a college production of The Comedy of Errors. She is a former member of the National Youth Theatre of Wales.

== Career ==
Nixon's career began in 2007, when she starred as the motherless Sophy Hutton in the BBC One costume drama series Cranford. In 2008, she had supporting roles in the films Wild Child and Angus, Thongs and Perfect Snogging.

In September 2008, she made her stage debut as Griet in a tour and London run of an adaptation of Girl with a Pearl Earring.

Nixon appeared in Easy Virtue and played one of the leads in Cherrybomb opposite Rupert Grint and Robert Sheehan, before starring in Black Death. In 2011, Nixon played Josie in the Channel 4 TV comedy-drama series Fresh Meat, and starred alongside Michael Sheen, Andrea Riseborough and Iwan Rheon in Resistance, an adaptation of an Owen Sheers novel, which was released in the UK in November 2011.

Nixon appeared in the musical film Hunky Dory, which is set in 1976 Swansea, with Minnie Driver, Aneurin Barnard and George MacKay, directed by Marc Evans. The film premièred at the 55th BFI London Film Festival on 25 October 2011, and was released officially on 2 March 2012 in the UK.

Nixon starred alongside Jaime Winstone and Aneurin Barnard in Elfie Hopkins and the Gammons, a horror film about an aspiring teen detective who stumbles into her first real case when investigating the mysterious new family, the Gammons, in her neighbourhood. The film was released on 20 April 2012.

In 2012, Nixon starred in the movie Offender, a thriller about a man who sets up his own imprisonment in order to avenge the assault of his girlfriend. She also had leading roles in the ITV drama series "Kidnap and Ransom" and the BBC Two comedy-drama series Hebburn, alongside Chris Ramsey and Vic Reeves. The sitcom is written by stand-up comic Jason Cook and is based on his experiences of growing up in the north-east of England.

In June 2013, Nixon starred in "Greenshaw's Folly" in the sixth series of ITV's Agatha Christie's Marple, with Matt Willis, Fiona Shaw, Julia Sawalha, Vic Reeves and Martin Compston.

She starred in the 2014 BBC One Wales television remake of Dylan Thomas' radio drama Under Milk Wood as Myfanwy Price.

She also starred in the Playhouse Presents one-off episode The Dog Thrower, with Matthew Perry and Tim Key, which aired on 1 May 2014 on Sky Arts.

Nixon starred in the medical drama Critical, with Lennie James, Emma Fryer and Paul Bazely, that debuted on Sky 1 on 24 February 2015. She also starred in a Welsh thriller titled Kingdom of Rain, with Julian Lewis Jones and Robert Kazinsky. She took a lead role in the third season of Outlander.

In 2022, Nixon appeared as Donna in the BBC drama Life and Death in the Warehouse.

In 2023, Nixon played the role of Ms Parkinson in Channel 4's standalone drama Consent.

In 2026, Nixon stars in the one-woman show, Baby Brain, a semi-autobiographical play about a new mum struggling with postpartum psychosis. It premiered to a sold out performance in Porter's Cardiff, and received a 5-star review from The Edit Wales. The show will enjoy a UK tour in 2026, including the Edinburgh Fringe (Assembly). Nixon's autobiography, She Seems Fine To Me, about her personal experience with perinatal OCD, is published by Simon & Schuster.

== Personal life ==
Nixon is a supporter of Humanists UK. She has spoken about having obsessive–compulsive disorder and this came to a head after the birth of her first child in 2020 when she finally realised she had had intrusive thoughts all her life.

In June 2025, Nixon disclosed that she had been diagnosed with autism and ADHD, describing the diagnosis as a "huge weight" off her shoulders.

== Filmography ==
=== Films ===
Year	Title	Role
2008	Angus, Thongs and Perfect Snogging	Lindsay
2008	Wild Child	Kate
2008	Easy Virtue	Hilda Whittaker
2009	Cherrybomb	Michelle
2010	Black Death	Averill
2011	Hunky Dory	Vicki Munro
2011	Resistance	Bethan
2012	Elfie Hopkins	Pippa
2012	Offender	Elise
2014	Kingdom of Rain	Cerys
2026	Out There	Shelley

=== Television ===
Year	Title	Role	Notes
2007	Cranford	Sophy Hutton	5 episodes
2010	Agatha Christie's Poirot	Egg	Episode: "Three Act Tragedy"
2010	Law & Order: UK	Sally	Series 3, episode 6
2011	Midsomer Murders	Cloud	S13, episode 8, “Fit for Murder”
2011–2016	Fresh Meat	Josephine "Josie" Jones	Main role, 30 episodes
2012	Kidnap and Ransom	Florence Holland	Series 2
2012–2013	Hebburn	Sarah Pearson	Main role, 2 seasons
2013	Agatha Christie’s Marple	Louisa Oxley	Episode: "Greenshaw's Folly"
2013–2014	The Call Centre	Narrator	11 episodes
2014	Under Milk Wood	Myfanwy Price	TV movie
2015	Critical	Doctor Angharad 'Harry' Bennett-Edwards	Fit for Murder” Main role, 9 episodes
2015	Celebrity Mastermind	Herself	Series 14 episode 6 winner
2016	New Blood	Alison White	Main role, 7 episodes
2016	Ordinary Lies	Holly Pryce	Series 2
2017	Outlander	Millie Nelson	Season 3, episode 1
2017	Murder on the Blackpool Express	Laura Bishop	TV movie
2018	Nige	Michelle	TV movie
2019	Death in Paradise	Catrina McVey	Series 8, episode 3
2019	The Left Behind	Hannah	One-off special
2020–2022	The Tuckers	Lush	6 episodes
2020	The Salisbury Poisonings	Hannah Mitchell	Series 1, episode 2
2020	Roald & Beatrix: The Tail of the Curious Mouse	Lavender doll	TV movie
2022	Life and Death in the Warehouse	Donna	BBC Television film
2022	The Baby	Claudia	Episode: The Bulldozer
2023	Consent	Ms Parkinson	TV movie
2023	Partygate	Kate Joseph	Political docudrama
2024	Shardlake	Joan	Miniseries
2024	My Lady Jane	Lettie	Episode: "Wild Thing"
2025	The Guest	Eleri Abbott	BBC drama
2026	Under Salt Marsh	Shell Hill	Miniseries

Video Games
Year	Title	Role
2021	Bravely Default II	Martha (voice)
