= Rosie Ramsey =

English podcaster and television presenter (born 1986)

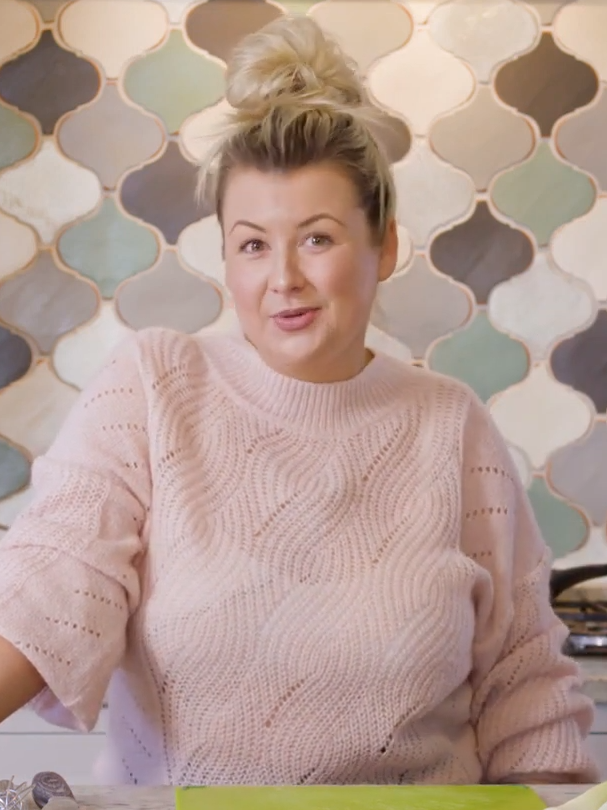
- Ramsey in 2021
- Born: Rosemary Winter; 30 August 1986 (age 40); South Shields, Tyne and Wear, England
- Occupations: Podcaster; author; television presenter
- Years active: 2017–present
- Spouse: Chris Ramsey (m. 2014)
- Children: 2

Rosemary Ramsey (née Winter; born 30 August 1986) is an English podcaster, author and television presenter. Alongside husband Chris Ramsey, she co-hosts the comedy podcast Shagged Married Annoyed (2019–present) and the BBC chat show The Chris & Rosie Ramsey Show (2022–2024).

Her solo projects have included appearances on the game shows The Wheel, Would I Lie to You?, Taskmaster, and You Bet! and being a contestant on the Strictly Come Dancing 2022 Christmas Special.

== Early life ==
Rosemary Winter was born on 30 August 1986 in South Shields, Tyne and Wear to Sandra (née Crawford) and Derek Winter. She has an older sister, Kate, and a younger brother, Kevin.

== Career ==
Prior to her media work, Ramsey worked as a Bluecoat at Pontins in Somerset, an announcer at Newcastle Racecourse and as a presenter on radio station Capital.

In 2017, Ramsey and her husband appeared on the Channel 4 series Parenting for Idiots. She also had a minor role in the television film Death on the Tyne in 2018, in which she voiced the engineer on the radio.

In February 2019, the pair started a weekly podcast titled Shagged Married Annoyed, which they co-host from their home. It is one of the UK’s most listened to podcasts, with more than 170 million downloads to date. The podcast won the Listeners' Choice Award at the British Podcast Awards along with a bronze award for Best New Podcast in 2020. They have also toured their live show around the country, with arena tours in 2020 and 2023. In 2020 they set the Guinness World Record for the biggest live podcast show at London’s O2 Arena.

Ramsey and her husband appeared on an episode of Alan Carr's Epic Gameshow in 2020. In November 2021, it was announced that the Ramseys would co-present a new chat show commissioned by the BBC: The Chris & Rosie Ramsey Show. The show was commissioned for second series in June 2022. In December 2022, Ramsey took part in the Strictly Come Dancing 2022 Christmas Special. She was partnered with Neil Jones and danced the Jive to "Step Into Christmas", which subsequently scored them 39/40 points. The Ramseys were nominated for the National Television Award "TV Interview" category in 2023.

In March 2024, Ramsey was one of the presenters for the Comic Relief telethon. In 2025, Ramsey appeared as a contestant on the nineteenth series of the Channel 4 show Taskmaster alongside Fatiha El-Ghorri, Jason Mantzoukas, Mathew Baynton, and Stevie Martin.

== Personal life ==
Ramsey met comedian Chris Ramsey when they were 14, whilst socialising in similar friendship circles and they went on to attend the same college. After encountering each other again in a nightclub, they began dating in 2012, and got engaged six months into their relationship before getting married on 25 July 2014. Their first son was born in October 2015. In 2018, the couple shared via social media that Ramsey had had a miscarriage when she was 12 weeks pregnant with their second child.

In July 2020, the couple announced that they were expecting again; the baby boy was born on 6 January 2021.

== Filmography ==
Year	Title	Role	Notes	Ref.
2017	Parenting for Idiots	Self	Episode: "Rules"	
2018	The Chris Ramsey Show	Guest	Episode: #2.5	
2018	Death on the Tyne	Engineer on radio (voice)		
2018	Lorraine	Guest		
2019	Good Morning Britain	Guest	Episode: 10 April 2019	
2019	The Sara Cox Show	Guest	2 episodes	
2019, 2020	Saturday Kitchen	Guest	2 episodes	
2020	This Morning	Guest		
2020	Alan Carr's Epic Gameshow	Contestant	Episode: "Play Your Cards Right Celebrity Special"	
2020	Sunday Brunch	Guest	Episode: #9.40	
2021	Ant & Dec's Saturday Night Takeaway	Guest	Episode: #17.4	
2021	The One Show	Guest		
2021	Teen Mum Academy	Narrator	10 episodes	
2021	Strictly Come Dancing: It Takes Two	Guest	2 episodes	
2021, 2022	CBeebies Bedtime Story	Storyteller	3 episodes	
2021, 2023	The Graham Norton Show	Guest	2 episodes	
2021, 2023	The Chris & Rosie Ramsey Show	Co-presenter		
2022	Strictly Come Dancing	Contestant	2022 Christmas Special	
2023	Michael McIntyre's Big Show	Guest	Episode: #6.3	
2023	National Comedy Awards	Guest		
2023	The Lateish Show with Mo Gilligan	Guest	Episode: #4.1	
2023	Who Do You Think You Are?	Guest		
2023 - 2024	The Wheel	Guest		
2024	Comic Relief	Guest		
2025	Taskmaster	Contestant	Series 19; 10 episodes	

== Podcasts ==
- Shagged Married Annoyed (2019–present)
- Eras: Spice Girls (2026)

== Tours ==
- Shagged Married Annoyed Live! (2021–present)
