= Black Death (film) =

2010 film by Christopher Smith

- Theatrical release poster
- Directed by: Christopher Smith
- Written by: Dario Poloni; Christopher Smith (uncredited)
- Produced by: Douglas Rae; Robert Bernstein; Jens Meurer; Phil Robertson
- Starring: Sean Bean; Eddie Redmayne; John Lynch; Tim McInnerny; Kimberley Nixon; Andy Nyman; Carice van Houten
- Cinematography: Sebastian Edschmid
- Edited by: Stuart Gazzard
- Music by: Christian Henson
- Production companies: Egoli Tossell Film; HanWay Films; Ecosse Films; Zephyr Films
- Distributed by: Revolver Entertainment (UK); Wild Bunch (Germany)
- Release dates: 11 June 2010 (UK); 9 September 2010 (Germany)
- Running time: 101 minutes
- Countries: Germany; United Kingdom
- Languages: English; Latin
- Box office: $272,445 (Worldwide)

Black Death is a 2010 action horror film directed by Christopher Smith from an original screenplay by Dario Poloni. It stars Sean Bean, Eddie Redmayne and Carice van Houten. Despite not being credited as a writer, Smith made very significant changes in the second half of the script, including a new ending. All the scenes of Black Death were shot in chronological order, a rare occurrence.

== Plot ==
In 1348, during the Black Death in Medieval England, novice monk Osmund has a secret relationship with a young woman named Averill who has taken sanctuary in his monastery. When the disease strikes the monastery, Averill departs at Osmund's urging but promises to wait one week for Osmund at a nearby forest. Osmund prays for a sign from God to leave the monastery and reunite with Averill. Shortly afterwards, Ulric, an envoy for the regional bishop, arrives at the monastery seeking a guide through the forest to reach a remote marshland village untouched by the plague. Taking Ulric's arrival as the sign to leave, Osmund volunteers to serve as the guide and joins his group, which consists of soldiers Wolfstan, Griff, Dalywag, Mold, Ivo, and Swire. The group informs Osmund that the village is believed to be led by a necromancer, whom they intend to deliver to the bishop for trial and execution.

The journey to the village leads to the deaths of Griff and Ivo, while Osmund finds Averill's blood-stained clothing and believes she has died. Eventually reaching their destination, the group is met by Hob and Langiva, the village's leaders. Aware of the group's intentions, the villagers drug the soldiers, while Osmund learns that Averill's body is in the village and witnesses Langiva perform a ritual that revives her.

The members of the group are bound and placed in a water-filled pit where Hob and Langiva offer freedom to those who will renounce God. When the group refuses, Dalywag is crucified and disemboweled. The sight causes Swire to renounce his faith, only for the villagers to hang him in the woods. Afterwards, Osmund is brought to Averill and, believing her to be in a state of suffering, stabs her to save her soul. Ulric is then taken from the pit to be dismembered by horses, but before the villagers execute him, he reveals that the plague infects him and has brought it to the village. With the villagers distracted by this revelation, Wolfstan and Mold free themselves with a knife Osmund snuck into the pit and fight back. Hob kills Mold but is incapacitated by Wolfstan and placed in the device for transporting the necromancer.

Osmund pursues Langiva to the swamp, where she tells him that she is not a witch and Averill did not die in the forest. Instead, Averill had been drugged, and her apparent resurrection was an act; her actual death was caused by Osmund stabbing her. Broken by this information, Osmund is unable to prevent Langiva from escaping. Wolfstan, deeming the mission to be completed, returns Osmund to the monastery, with Hob to be delivered to the bishop. In the following years, the village becomes afflicted by the plague (its relative isolation being the true source of protection). At the same time, Wolfstan loses contact with Osmund, but hears rumours of him becoming cold and cruel as he dedicates himself to finding and punishing Langiva- however, he executes many innocent women due to his mind causing him to see Langiva when he looks at them.

== Cast ==
- Eddie Redmayne as Osmund
- Sean Bean as Ulric
- Carice van Houten as Langiva
- John Lynch as Wolfstan
- Tim McInnerny as Hob
- Kimberley Nixon as Averill
- Andy Nyman as Dalywag
- David Warner as The Abbot
- Johnny Harris as Mold
- Emun Elliott as Swire
- Tygo Gernandt as Ivo
- Jamie Ballard as Griff
- Daniel Steiner as Monk
- Nike Martens as Elena

== Production ==
Black Death was developed and produced by Douglas Rae and Robert Bernstein at London's Ecosse Films, with Phil Robertson of Zephyr Films acting as physical producer. Ultimately it could not get off the ground in the UK and became a 100% German production. The film was financed solely from Germany, with Jens Meurer of Egoli Tossell Films acting as producer.

The film was originally due to be directed by Geoffrey Sax. Rupert Friend and Lena Headey were attached to star. Famke Janssen was later considered for Headey's role. After he was attached to direct Black Death, Smith suggested Carice van Houten, Tim McInnerny, and John Lynch for their respective roles.

The film was shot in the German federal state of Saxony-Anhalt at Blankenburg Castle in the city of Blankenburg and Castle Querfurt in Querfurt and Zehdenick, Brandenburg in the first half of 2009. Van Houten's first day on set was 14 May 2009. Technical elements included production design by John Frankish, a spartan score by composer Christian Henson, and cinematography by Sebastian Edschmid.

=== Smith's approach to the film and script changes ===
Smith explained his approach to the film:

It's a 'medieval guys on a mission' movie. The period of the black death – what's fantastical and rich about that period? I said, 'What if we took a realistic approach?' The people of the time believed the plague was sent by God to punish them for their sins, or by the Devil to torment them. I wanted to find out what the characters felt and posit them on a journey of 'is it real? Or is it not real?' What would a necromancer be like if he existed? We added this fundamentalist knight, so it touches on fundamentalism. It's a super dark film but it's exciting. It's like a dark parable about how things haven't really moved on in the last 600 years.

In the original script, the second half of the film turned out to be entirely supernatural: Langiva was revealed to be the reincarnation of the Devil, while Osmund "was actually in Hell and Hell being in the physical place". Smith changed these elements to represent the idea that to him "Hell is the Hell you are in within yourself", as he tried to represent in Triangle. Because it was considered too dark, producers tried to cut Smith's ending from the shooting schedule. However, they changed their minds two days before the shootings of the epilogue.

== Release ==
International sales were handled by HanWay Films. Amongst other deals, Revolver Entertainment/Sony acquired the rights for the UK and planned a release on 28 May 2010, while Wild Bunch distributed the film in Germany. The film is part of the Canadian Fantasia 2010.

== Reception ==
Review aggregator Rotten Tomatoes reports an approval rating of 71% based on 66 reviews, with an average rating of 6.3/10. The critical consensus states: "Black Death delivers the fire and brimstone violence its subject matter warrants while posing some interesting questions of faith and religion." On Metacritic, the film has an aggregated score of 71 out of 100 based on 10 reviews, indicating "generally favorable reviews".

In an advance review, Leslie Felperin of Variety wrote "A savvy, stylish horror-actioner that's more than the sum of its genre parts, Black Death manages to deliver enough suspense and bloodletting to appease gore fans... Use of grainy stock and a preference for special effects rather than visual or CGI effects gives it a pleasingly retro feel, as does its willingness to explore uncomfortable moral ambiguities. Tech credits create a strong, fetid atmosphere on what looks like a low budget. German locations in Saxony look appropriately beautiful, sinister and ancient all at the same time."

Alan Jones from Film4's FrightFest concluded: "Some may find the climax rather disconcerting as Smith pulls the rug from under one's feet. However, the greater percentage will thrill to the way the eerie and puzzling intensity builds up a compelling head of scream as the stark brand of Witchfinder General shock value rears its head in the most startling of codas. This intelligent original represents a commendable break from the genre norm and is one of the most powerful films made about God, the godless and what the Devil truly represents."

== See also ==
- List of historical drama films
