= Hebburn (TV series) =

- Genre: Comedy
- Created by: Jason Cook
- Written by: Jason Cook; Graham Duff
- Directed by: Christine Gernon
- Starring: Kimberley Nixon; Chris Ramsey; Jim Moir; Gina McKee
- Country of origin: United Kingdom
- Original language: English
- No. of series: 2
- No. of episodes: 13

Production
- Producer: Gill Isles
- Cinematography: John Daly
- Editor: Liana Del Giudice
- Running time: 30 minutes
- Production companies: Baby Cow Productions; Channel X North

Original release
- Network: BBC Two
- Release: 18 October 2012 – 22 December 2013

Hebburn is a BBC television comedy series set in Hebburn in Tyne & Wear. The six-part series commenced broadcasting on BBC Two on 18 October 2012 starring Kimberley Nixon and Chris Ramsey. The show is written by Jason Cook and Graham Duff and follows the recently wedded couple Jack and Sarah alongside Jack's family.

The show received a mixed critical reaction, including criticism from residents of the town on which it was based. A Christmas special was commissioned as well as a second series, which began airing on BBC Two on 12 November 2013. In March 2014 it was announced by the BBC that Hebburn would not be returning for a third series.

== Plot ==
The series follows the Pearson family, Joe (Vic Reeves, credited under his real name, Jim Moir) and Pauline (Gina McKee) and their son Jack (Chris Ramsey), who secretly married a middle-class Jewish woman, Sarah (Kimberley Nixon), in a drunken binge in Las Vegas.

== Development and production ==
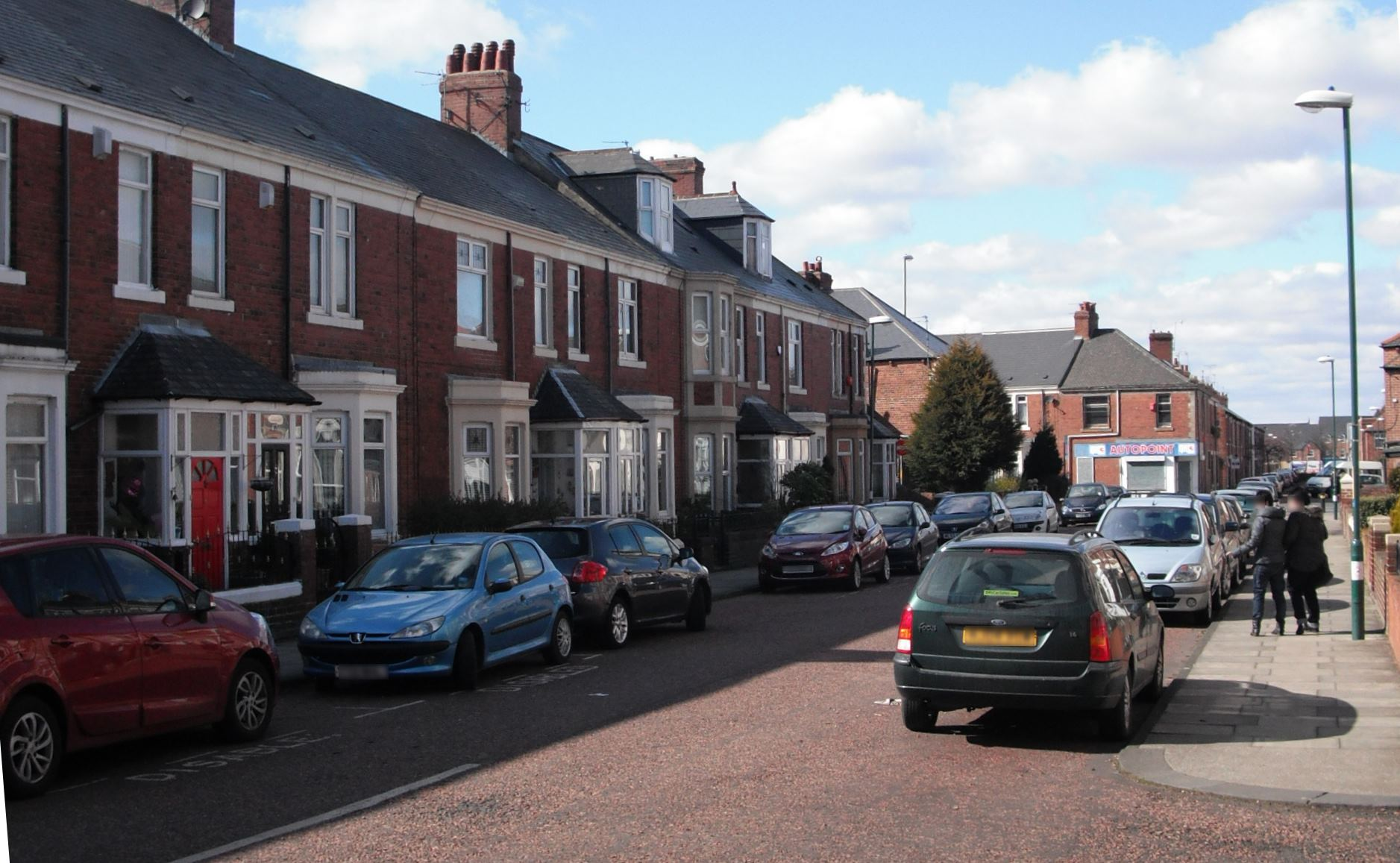
The exterior location of the Pearsons' house on Park Road, Hebburn, South Tyneside

Hebburn was created by comic Jason Cook, inspired by Hebburn in South Tyneside, the town in which he was raised. It was piloted in October 2011 through a live performance as part of the Salford Sitcom Showcase at MediaCityUK. A six-part series was then commissioned by Channel X North and Steve Coogan's production company Baby Cow Productions. Cook co-wrote the series with Graham Duff, who had written the sitcom Ideal.

Chris Ramsey, a comic from South Shields, was cast to play Jack Pearson, with Kimberley Nixon as his new wife, Sarah. Vic Reeves (credited under his real name, Jim Moir) and Gina McKee were cast as his parents. The show also featured Geordie actors Victoria Elliott and Lisa McGrillis, alongside performances from North East stand-ups Steffen Peddie, Barry Dodds and Alfie Joey.

Principal photography began with a week's shoot on location in Hebburn on 23 April 2012, with the production based at High Lane Social Club in the town. Park Road, the street on which Cook was raised, prominently featured in the shoot. Following the location shoot in South Tyneside, the production moved to its main base at studios in Manchester.

The series concluded with Joe, played by Moir, having a stroke at Jack and Sarah's wedding. Writer Jason Cook says that this was important for him as his own father had a stroke, "so that was like a love letter to my mum and dad." His father's stroke had inspired Cook's critically acclaimed 2007 stand-up show, My Confessions. The fictitious pub in the show 'Swayze's' is an in joke for those familiar with Hebburn town, poking fun at a local run down pub called "The Road House" (Road House was a Patrick Swayze film). The exterior scenes of the pub were filmed outside "The Kelly" public house in Hebburn.

Filming of the second series began in August 2013. It was announced the same month that Melanie Hill would join the cast for the second series, and, pending some teasing about Cook about a "propa legend" in the second series, it was revealed that Tim Healy would have a cameo role in the first episode of the second series. The series also featured Toby Hadoke, Alfie Joey, Seymour Mace and Terry Joyce.

== Cast ==
- Chris Ramsey as Jack Pearson
- Kimberley Nixon as Sarah Pearson
- Gina McKee as Pauline Pearson
- Jim Moir as Joe Pearson
- Lisa McGrillis as Vicki Pearson
- Pat Dunn as Dot
- Jason Cook as Ramsey
- Curtis Appleby as Hutchy
- Kathryn Hunt as Siobhan
- Neil Grainger as Gervaise
- Victoria Elliott as Denise
- Jan Ravens as Susan
- Phil Nice as Ben
- John Woodvine as Arthur
- Verity-May Henry as Marial
- Steffen Peddie as Big Keith
- Barry Dodds as The Heckler

== Episodes ==
=== Series 1 (2012) ===
No. overall	No. in series	Title	Original release date	Viewers (millions)
1	1	"Welcome to Hebburn, Pet"	18 October 2012	1.81
Jack (Chris Ramsey) drives his wife, Sarah (Kimberley Nixon) home to meet his parents who don't know they got married in Vegas. Sarah meets the family and reveals she is Jewish. Through the 'thin walls' Jack's sister finds out they're married and reveals this to Sarah in the pub toilet while saying she will not tell her parents. A punter dies at the bar and Dot finds photos of the wedding on Sarah's phone, revealing the wedding to Pauline and the whole pub.
2	2	"Ghost Town"	25 October 2012	1.44
Jack and Sarah return to Hebburn to help move Jack's Nan out of her care home. His mother is still sullen with him for not telling her about his wedding, and Jack is hoping that his £30,000 book deal on Paul Gascoigne's memoirs will make it up to her. When she is not completely satisfied, Jack agrees to use the money from his book deal for a proper wedding, to Sarah's dismay. After Nan's possessions are in the car, however, Jack is informed that his book deal has fallen through. Now heavily in debt, he and Sarah are forced to move in with his family, much to his mother's delight, and forcing Nan to remain at the home, having insulted all of the patrons as she left.
3	3	"Dressing up Fancy"	1 November 2012	1.19
Sarah's parents (from York) are due to visit Hebburn for the first time; Ramsey's on hand to show them around, and Pauline's desperate to impress. But things could get out of hand when a second wedding is mooted.
4	4	"Feeling Dynamic"	8 November 2012	0.98
Dot buys Vicki a new car and nearly drives her off a mental cliff when they get lost. Jack has a disastrous interview with the editor (Arthur Bostrom) at the Barnsley Gazette, and Sarah finds out she is pregnant.
5	5	"She Doesn't Just Give it Away"	15 November 2012	1.12
It is Jack's first day back on the Hebburn Advertiser - and he has plans to transform it into a paper that makes a difference. The only other employee (Graham Duff) is a little less ambitious.
6	6	"A Very Big Day"	22 November 2012	0.91
Wedding day has arrived in Hebburn. Though Jack and Sarah are technically already married, Pauline and Dot are determined to treat it like their special day.

=== Series 2 (2013) ===
No. overall	No. in series	Title	Original release date	Viewers (millions)
7	1	"Welcome Home"	12 November 2013	N/A
Following Joe's stroke, Pauline returns to work as an estate agent. With a baby on the way, Jack and Sarah search for somewhere to live. Meanwhile, while Vicki tries to make a better life for herself, and Dot is looking for a way out of her retirement home.
8	2	"Easy Tiger"	19 November 2013	N/A
Having been forced out of the retirement home, Dot moves back in with the family. Jack and Sarah have found a place of their own, and Jack gets a book deal, but quickly discovers that it's not for the story he intended to tell. Pauline is being bullied at work. However, she does make her first sale as an estate agent.
9	3	"Knocking About"	26 November 2013	N/A
Joe and Dot are left home alone, as Pauline leaves for a training day.
10	4	"Stairway To Hebburn"	5 December 2013	N/A
Joe is showing romantic signs of recovery and Pauline's new cupcake business is on the up. Meanwhile, Sarah and Jack receive an unexpected visitor.
11	5	"Still Swayze's After All These Years"	10 December 2013	N/A
Sarah goes into labour.
12	6	"Gas and Air"	17 December 2013	N/A
Sarah has more than being a new mum to celebrate, when she passes her PhD and is offered an incredible job overseas.
Christmas Special
13	7	"Sleep in Hebburnly Peace"	22 December 2013	N/A

== Reception ==
The first series received mixed reviews. The Guardian's Sam Wollaston labelled the series "Hebburn Meh-burn", saying that its "neither brave nor original," claiming that the characters "don't behave or speak like real people, they behave and speak like a sitcom family." similarly, The Independent's Tom Sutcliffe suggested "there's not a lot in Hebburn that you haven't seen before", comparing the show to The Royle Family. At the same time, Sutcliffe says that Hebburn "is quite distinctively its own thing", and praises the show's "sharpness of characterisation for them to show how good they can be right from the off."

Some people from Hebburn, including a local councillor, objected to the show's portrayal of the town and its residents. Despite the mixed critical reaction, a second series and Christmas special were commissioned, with writer Jason Cook revealing ambitions to launch a four-day comedy festival in the town.

The second series, broadcast in autumn 2013, also received mixed reviews. Writing for The Guardian, Dominic Sandbrook said: "It’s still not exactly subtle comedy, but the first episode of the new run turned out to have more gags than the whole of the first series combined. If scriptwriter Jason Cook can belatedly find his sense of humour, then so can the people of Hebburn." The Independent's Ellen E Jones branded the series "a relic from a different era", saying that "it really belongs to that breed of untaxing sitcom in which the gentle laughs are so predictable that you could set your pacemaker by them." In contrast to the broadsheets, South Tyneside local newspaper Shields Gazette's Vicki Newman, who "was given exclusive behind-the-scenes access during filming", praised the show, writing that it "has so much heart that, to me, it was no surprise that it was commissioned for a second series. The show looks sharper, and it just feels bigger and better than the first series."

In January 2013, Hebburn was voted the "Best New TV Sitcom" in the Comedy.co.uk Awards held by the British Comedy Guide. The show won the regional Royal Television Society award in March 2013, and was nominated in the Best Comedy category in the National Television Awards.

== DVD release ==
Only the first series has been released on DVD. The complete first series of Hebburn was released onto DVD on 26 November 2012. Series Two is available as a digital download only from Amazon. Although both series are available on BBC iPlayer as at March 2023.
