= A Question of Sport =

British television sports quiz show (1970–2023)

- Genre: Sports quiz show
- Created by: Nick Hunter
- Presented by: Stuart Hall (Pilot, 1968); David Vine (1970–1972, 1974–1977, 1989); David Coleman (1979–1997); Sue Barker (1997–2021); Paddy McGuinness (2021–2023)
- Starring: Cliff Morgan (1968–1975); Henry Cooper (1968–1979); Fred Trueman (1976–1977); Brendan Foster (1977–1979); Emlyn Hughes (1979–1981, 1984–88); Gareth Edwards (1979–1981); Willie Carson (1982–83); Bill Beaumont (1982–1996); Ian Botham (1988–1996); John Parrott (1996–2002); Ally McCoist (1996–2007); Frankie Dettori (2002–2004); Matt Dawson (2004–2021); Phil Tufnell (2008–2021); Sam Quek (2021–2023); Ugo Monye (2021–2023)
- Theme music composer: Richie Close
- Country of origin: United Kingdom
- Original language: English
- No. of series: 52
- No. of episodes: 1,365; Landmarks: 4 March 2013: 1,000th episode

Production
- Executive producer: Gareth JM Edwards
- Producer: Dave Gymer
- Production locations: dock10 studios (studios HQ1 and HQ2 on rotation)
- Running time: 30 minutes
- Production companies: BBC (1968–2015); BBC Studios (2015–2023)

Original release
- Network: BBC One
- Release: 2 December 1968
- Release: 5 January 1970 – 8 September 2023

A Question of Sport (known as Question of Sport from 2021 until 2023) is a British television sports quiz show produced and broadcast by the BBC. It was the "world's longest running TV sports quiz". Following a pilot episode in December 1968, broadcast only in the north of England, the series ran from 1970 (except in 1973 and 1978) until production ceased in 2023. The final presenter was Paddy McGuinness, with team captains Sam Quek and Ugo Monye.

The show's viewing figures slumped from around 4 million in 2021 to around 800,000 in 2023 following an overhaul of the staff.

== History ==
=== First edition ===
The first edition of A Question of Sport was broadcast on 5 January 1970. Presenter David Vine was joined by captains Henry Cooper and Cliff Morgan. The teams were composed of George Best, Lillian Board, Tom Finney and Ray Illingworth.

=== 40th anniversary ===
On 8 January 2010, the BBC broadcast a 40th-anniversary special. Joining presenter Sue Barker and captains Matt Dawson and Phil Tufnell were Pat Cash, David Coulthard, Laura Davies and Michael Johnson.

=== 2012 Summer Olympics specials ===
Following the 2012 Summer Olympics, A Question of Sport aired two special editions featuring champions from the aforementioned Olympics.

==== Gold Medal Winners special ====
On 1 September 2012, Katherine Grainger and Jason Kenny were among the gold medal winners featured.

==== 2012 Olympics special ====
On 29 September 2012, Tim Baillie, Jade Jones, Laura Kenny, Greg Rutherford and Etienne Stott partook.

=== 1,000th episode ===
On 4 March 2013, A Question of Sport marked its 1,000th episode. Each captain was joined by two former captains. Dawson was joined by Willie Carson and John Parrott, while Tufnell was joined by Bill Beaumont and Ally McCoist. Tufnell's team won.

=== 2016 Summer Olympics specials ===
Shortly after the 2016 Summer Olympics, A Question of Sport held two special editions featuring champions from the above-mentioned Olympics.

==== The Olympic Champions special ====
On 7 September 2016, the Olympic Champions special featured gold medal winners, including Callum Skinner.

==== Gold Rush special ====
On 14 September 2016, for a Gold Rush special, A Question of Sport were joined by Maddie Hinch, Jason Kenny, Laura Kenny and Sam Quek.

=== 50th anniversary ===
==== A Question of Sport at 50 ====
On 27 December 2019, the BBC aired a documentary that looked back on the programme's history. As well as looking back through the archives, A Question of Sport at 50 saw a number of sportspeople recount their memories, these included: Jessica Ennis-Hill, Colin Jackson, and Denise Lewis. Sue Barker, Matt Dawson and Phil Tufnell also shared their experiences.

==== 50 Not Out ====
On 3 January 2020, Sue Barker presented a 50th-anniversary special. Matt Dawson captained a team composed of Laura Davies and Beth Tweddle, while Phil Tufnell led Ally McCoist and Martin Offiah. Dawson's team won, the 1,255th episode, by 19 points to 16.

=== Theme tune ===
There have been four theme tunes over the years. The current theme was introduced in the mid-1980s and has been remixed and updated several times since that time, most recently in 2021.

=== Cancellation ===
Following the programme producers' decision in 2021 to "refresh" the show by introducing a new host (Paddy McGuinness), Team Captains, and revising the structure of the quiz, there was an ensuing drop-off in audience figures. In December 2023, after two series of the revamped production, the BBC announced a decision to "shelve" the programme citing "inflation and funding challenges". The BBC did not rule out a future return of the programme.

== Rounds ==
The rounds regularly played during series 48 include:

=== Picture Board ===
Twelve numbered squares each reveal a sportsperson to be identified during this one-minute round.

=== One Minute Round ===
Each team is asked nine questions in 60 seconds.

=== Sports Action ===
Contestants are asked questions about a montage of sporting action.

=== Observation Round ===
Sports action is shown and contestants are asked questions about details of what they have just seen, e.g. "What colour hat was a certain person wearing?" or "How many balls were there?"

=== Mystery Guest ===
Each team tries to identify a sportsperson in unfamiliar circumstances and using unconventional camera angles.

=== Home or Away ===
Each contestant can answer a one-point "home question" on the sport they participate or participated in or can answer an "away question" on a different sport for up to three points—away questions require three answers, a point per correct answer.

=== Buzzer Round ===
The teams play head-to-head, answering as many questions as possible in 60 seconds. At this point, the round immediately ends, even if each presenter is halfway through asking a question.

=== Sprint Finish ===
The captains have 60 seconds to act out up to ten sporting terms for the remaining members of the team to guess.

== Presenters and captains ==
=== Presenters ===
The 1968 pilot episode, broadcast only in the north of England, was hosted by Stuart Hall. The first series was broadcast nationally from January 1970, with David Vine at the helm for the first five series. David Coleman succeeded Vine, and remained as presenter until 1997. Vine returned to the series as a guest host in 1989, presenting the final five episodes of series 18 in Coleman's absence. Sue Barker presented A Question of Sport from 1997 until 2021. She won the 1976 French Open tennis tournament and reached a World Ranking of 3. The final presenter was Paddy McGuinness, who took over in 2021.

=== Captains ===
A Question of Sport's first captains were boxer Henry Cooper and rugby union player Cliff Morgan. Over the history of the show, some captains have had long tenures: these include rugby union player Bill Beaumont making 319 appearances and footballer Ally McCoist making 363 appearances. The show's longest-serving captain is Matt Dawson, who appeared on the show for 17 years from 2004 to 2021.

The final team captains, who began on the show in 2021, were Ugo Monye and Sam Quek. Monye is a former rugby union international, who won 14 caps for England; he played club rugby for Harlequins and also played for the British & Irish Lions. Quek is a former hockey international, who won gold as part of the Great Britain women's national field hockey team at the 2016 Summer Olympics; she was the first female team captain on A Question of Sport.

Captains include:
5 rugby union players:
Cliff Morgan (1970–1972 and 1974–1975), Gareth Edwards (1979–1982), Bill Beaumont (1982–1996), Matt Dawson (2004–2021) and Ugo Monye (2021–2023)

3 cricketers:
Fred Trueman (1976–1977), Ian Botham (1988–1996) and Phil Tufnell (2008–2021)

2 jockeys:
Willie Carson (1982–1984) and Frankie Dettori (2002–2004)

2 footballers:
Emlyn Hughes (1979–1982, 1984–1988) and Ally McCoist (1996–2007)

1 boxer:
Henry Cooper (1970–1972, 1974–1977 and 1979)

1 long-distance runner:
Brendan Foster (1977 and 1979)

1 snooker player:
John Parrott (1996–2002)

1 hockey player:
Sam Quek (2021–2023)

=== Guest captains ===
Over the years there have been several guest captains standing in for one of the regulars when they have other commitments. Following Ally McCoist's departure, several guests, including Phil Tufnell, sat in the captain's chair before Tufnell was eventually selected as McCoist's permanent replacement:

- Bobby Moore, footballer (1968, 1970, 1972 and 1974)
- Johnny Haynes, footballer (1970)
- Bobby Charlton, footballer (1972 and 1974–75)
- Mary Peters, athlete (1976)
- Alan Pascoe, athlete (1976)
- John Barnes, footballer (1992)
- Roger Black, track and field athlete (1992)
- John Parrott, snooker (1992)
- Ally McCoist, footballer (1996)
- Will Carling, rugby union player (1996)
- Sam Torrance, golfer (1997–98 and 2003)
- Rob Wainwright, rugby union player (1997)
- Jonathan Davies, rugby union player (1998)
- David Ginola, footballer (2000)
- Matthew Pinsent, rower (2003)
- Alan Hansen, footballer (2003)
- Neil Ruddock, footballer (2003–04)
- Michael Owen, footballer (2004)
- David Seaman, footballer (2004)
- Matt Dawson, rugby union player (2004)
- Bill Beaumont, rugby union player (2004)
- Tim Henman, tennis player (2004)
- Jamie Redknapp, footballer (2007)
- Shane Warne, cricketer (2007)
- Darren Gough, cricketer (2007)
- Phil Tufnell, cricketer (2007)
- Ricky Hatton, boxer (2007)
- Dennis Taylor, snooker (2008)
- Gary Speed, footballer (2008)
- Graeme Swann, cricketer (2014)
- Michael Vaughan, cricketer (2014)
- Robbie Savage, footballer (2014)
- Greg Rutherford, track and field athlete (2015)

== Notable moments ==
- Emlyn Hughes during a 1987 Picture Board identifying Princess Anne as John Reid.
- Princess Anne appearing on the 200th edition of the programme, shortly after being identified as John Reid.
- Ally McCoist not being able to identify himself as a showjumper in a clip.
- Frankie Dettori "struggling to unscramble" an anagram of Frankie Dettori.
- Ally McCoist not being able to "recognise his Rangers boss at the time", Walter Smith, as a Mystery Guest.
- During Mystery Guest rounds, Sue Barker has been guessed as Ray Clemence, Chris Hoy, Alan Minter, and Dennis Taylor.
- Paul O'Connell correctly guessing Borussia Monchengladbach after two letters.
- John Parrott getting beaten to the buzzer by Matt Dawson on a question about snooker in a January 1999 episode. The question was: "In which sport would you use a spider?" Parrott was so embarrassed by this, he stood in the audience for a brief moment.
- Welsh rugby player Adam Jones achieved the record number of correct answers for a contestant in a single episode, with eighteen out of eighteen.

== Transmissions ==
Series	Start date	End date	Episodes
Pilot	2 December 1968		1
1	5 January 1970	18 May 1970	20
2	11 January 1971	5 April 1971	13
3	20 March 1972	19 June 1972	14
4	8 January 1974	2 April 1974	13
5	10 July 1975	28 August 1975	8
6	3 May 1976	21 June 1976	8
7	18 April 1977	6 June 1977	8
8	8 January 1979	2 April 1979	13
9	7 January 1980	18 March 1980	11
10	27 February 1981	15 May 1981	12
11	5 January 1982	30 March 1982	13
12	12 January 1983	30 March 1983	11
13	29 December 1983	8 May 1984	14
14	31 December 1984	11 April 1985	15
15	5 December 1985	1 May 1986	20
16	11 December 1986	14 May 1987	21
17	3 December 1987	26 April 1988	21
18	25 October 1988	11 April 1989	24
19	24 October 1989	1 May 1990	26
20	23 October 1990	23 April 1991	26
21	15 October 1991	21 April 1992	26
22	27 October 1992	20 April 1993	26
23	19 October 1993	30 May 1994	28
24	11 October 1994	2 May 1995	26
25	20 October 1995	3 May 1996	27
26	1 October 1996	30 May 1997	29
27	7 October 1997	1 May 1998	26
28	4 November 1998	21 June 1999	27
29	6 September 1999	2 July 2000	30
30	16 October 2000	21 May 2001	32
31	5 September 2001	24 July 2002	29
32	18 October 2002	15 August 2003	31
33	3 October 2003	13 August 2004	42
34	17 September 2004	15 July 2005	41
35	10 September 2005	8 September 2006	42
36	15 September 2006	18 May 2007	34
37	15 September 2007	11 June 2008	36
38	5 September 2008	12 June 2009	42
39	2 October 2009	27 August 2010	35
40	29 November 2010	1 August 2011	36
41	8 August 2011	20 August 2012	35
42	1 September 2012	31 July 2013	36
43	21 October 2013	13 August 2014	30
44	20 August 2014	15 July 2015	31
45	12 August 2015	5 August 2016	36
46	24 August 2016	31 May 2017	36
47	16 August 2017	23 May 2018	35
48	18 July 2018	12 April 2019	36
49	21 June 2019	29 May 2020	36
50	5 June 2020	28 May 2021	36
51	3 September 2021	24 June 2022	35
52	22 July 2022	8 September 2023	36

== Spin-offs ==
The A Question of Sport format has been applied to various other areas of knowledge. The following spin-off series were all made by the BBC:

- A Question of News, presented by Richard Baker, 1971; Katharine Whitehorn and Brian Redhead were the team captains.

Series	Start date	End date	Episodes
1	19 April 1971	24 May 1971	6

- A Question of Entertainment, presented by Tom O'Connor, 1988; Ken Dodd and Larry Grayson were the team captains. The show was reformatted and retitled That's Showbusiness and was broadcast under this title from 1989 to 1996.

Series	Start date	End date	Episodes
1	24 April 1988	28 August 1988	18

- A Question of Pop, presented by Jamie Theakston, 2000–01, which used the same graphics and set as the Sport version but different colours. Noddy Holder (Tony Hadley in episode 1) and Suggs were the team captains.

Series	Start date	End date	Episodes
	3 January 2000		1
1	8 April 2000	3 June 2000	9
	28 December 2000		1
2	28 April 2001	28 July 2001	12

- A Question of TV, presented by Gaby Roslin, 2001; Lorraine Kelly and Rowland Rivron were the team captains.

Series	Start date	End date	Episodes
1	5 July 2001	29 August 2001	8

- A Question of Sport: Super Saturday with Jason Manford in 2014 on BBC One

Roslin also hosted a one-off special, A Question of EastEnders, in 2000. Another one-off special, A Question of Comedy, was to have been aired on 16 March 2007 as a part of Comic Relief 2007, but after a scandal involving contestant Jade Goody it was replaced with a special edition of Top Gear titled Top Gear of the Pops.

A Question of Spit was a short segment aired in 1988 as part of the inaugural Red Nose Day telethon, featuring Daley Thompson, Barry McGuigan and Mike Gatting forming a team, with their opponents being their own Spitting Image puppets, captained by an Emlyn Hughes puppet. The quiz was hosted by the Spitting Image puppet of David Coleman, with the real Coleman and the puppet Steve Davis also making an appearance.

On 21 March 2012, One Media Radio's Final Whistle produced a one-off end-of-year special titled Final Quizzle: Final Whistle does A Question of Sport. Presented by Barry Landy, the show featured two teams consisting of Stuart Hodge, Rory Wilde, Phil Peacock, Steve Sanders, Ben Mouncer and Lewis Davies and included rounds such as 'Tiger's Eighteen Holes' and 'Whelan or Fortune'.

In November 2012, One Media Radio's Head of Sport Edmund Doc Crosthwaite confirmed that Final Quizzle would return for a one-off Christmas special on 12 December 2012.

A Question of Sport Relief is a special version of the show usually presented by a guest presenter on Sport Relief night since 2002. The 2002, 2004 and 2006 versions were hosted by Stephen Fry. 2008's version was hosted by Jimmy Carr after Fry had to withdraw, having broken his arm.

BBC One Scotland aired a one-off A Question of Scotland as part of Children in Need 2008, with Jackie Bird as quizmaster.

The CBBC programme Dick and Dom in da Bungalow made a parody called A Question of Muck as part of the 'creamy muck muck' grand finale game.

The CBBC programme The Saturday Show did a segment called A Question of Busted. Featuring the band Busted answering questions about themselves, it was presented by Fearne Cotton who in each segment was dressed as Sue Barker.

== International versions ==
Country/region	Local title	Presenter(s)	Channel	Date premiered
Vietnam	Tôi yêu Thể thao	Trịnh Long Vũ	VTV3 VCTV3 - Thể thao TV	27 May 2007 – 31 December 2008

== In popular culture ==
The What Happened Next? round was spoofed in an episode of A Bit of Fry & Laurie as David Coleman (Fry) asks Emlyn Hughes (Laurie) to guess what happened after the action stopped in the previous sketch. The host's refusal to confirm whether the given answer is correct then leads into another round of the game, with the question of what happened following the original What Happened Next? sketch.

The show was one of many British TV shows reinterpreted by Chanel 9, a recurring sketch on The Fast Show, where it was titled Questo Sporta and featured the mystery guest round.
