= Bigheads =

British 42

- Genre: Game show
- Directed by: Richard van't Riet
- Presented by: Jason Manford
- Starring: Jenny Powell; Kriss Akabusi
- Theme music composer: Nick Foster
- Country of origin: United Kingdom
- No. of seasons: 1
- No. of episodes: 6

Production
- Executive producers: Adam Wood; Mat Steiner; Paul Wright
- Producer: Keith Cotton
- Production location: Elstree Studios
- Running time: 60 minutes (including adverts)
- Production company: Primal Media

Original release
- Network: ITV
- Release: 23 April – 28 May 2017

Bigheads is a British television game show produced by Primal Media that aired on ITV From 23 April 2017 until 28 May 2017 and is hosted by Jason Manford with Jenny Powell and Kriss Akabusi as commentators. Contestants were dressed as celebrities with oversized heads that designed to be based from Spitting Image and Newzoids by competing in challenges and were eliminated until a winner was decided.

On 1 March 2018, the show was cancelled after one series.

== Format ==
Contestants are dressed as celebrities with oversized heads and compete in various challenges until a winner is found. It has been described as "It's a Knockout meets Spitting Image".

== Series overview ==
Series	Start	Finish	Episodes	Winner	Winner's Celebrity 'Bighead'
1	23 April 2017	28 May 2017	6	Nathan Martin	will.i.am

=== Series 1 (2017) ===
==== Episode 1 ====
Episode 1 was broadcast on 23 April 2017.

Contestant	Age	Occupation	Celebrity 'Bighead'	Status
Jess	19	Politics student	Theresa May	Eliminated 1st
Zoe	36	Police investigator	Camilla, Duchess of Cornwall	Eliminated 2nd
Sid	45	Ticket inspector	Simon Cowell	Eliminated 3rd
Gloria	28	Logistics manager	Adele	Eliminated 4th
Danny	29	Sales executive	Donald Trump	Eliminated 5th
Jason	26	Account executive	Benedict Cumberbatch	Eliminated 6th
Brian	45	Shift manager	Albert Einstein	Eliminated 7th
Tando	23	Marketing executive	Sir Mo Farah	Finalist

==== Episode 2 ====
Episode 2 was broadcast on 30 April 2017.

Contestant	Age	Occupation	Celebrity 'Bighead'	Status
Amy	28	Finance administrator	Queen Victoria	Eliminated 1st
Wil	38	Marketing manager	Ed Sheeran	Eliminated 2nd
Alex	27	Gymnastics coach	Vladimir Putin	Eliminated 3rd
Nicky	38	Personal trainer	Charles, Prince of Wales	Eliminated 4th
Tom	24	Renewals sales rep	David Beckham	Eliminated 5th
Charlie	28	Sales assistant	Taylor Swift	Eliminated 6th
Scott	24	Fitness trainer	William Shakespeare	Eliminated 7th
Aisha	33	Print assistant	Rihanna	Finalist

==== Episode 3 ====
Episode 3 was broadcast on 7 May 2017.

Contestant	Age	Occupation	Celebrity 'Bighead'	Status
Kirsty	31	Recruitment consultant	Marilyn Monroe	Eliminated 1st
John	43	IT support consultant	Henry VIII of England	Eliminated 2nd
Darren	48	Forklift truck driver	Sir Elton John	Eliminated 3rd
Natalie	24	Area fitness manager	Victoria Beckham	Eliminated 4th
Angelo	37	Firefighter	Sir Winston Churchill	Eliminated 5th
John	30	Farmfoods Worker	Boris Johnson	Eliminated 6th
Ethan	20	Film student	Gordon Ramsay	Eliminated 7th
Nathan	32	Personal trainer	will.i.am	Finalist

==== Episode 4 ====
Episode 4 was broadcast on 14 May 2017.

Contestant	Age	Occupation	Celebrity 'Bighead'	Status
Kelly	9	Middle school student	Marilyn Monroe	Eliminated 1st
Paula	49	Senior hire controller	Camilla, Duchess of Cornwall	Eliminated 2nd
Martina	50	Hairdresser	Adele	Eliminated 3rd
Nile	52	Truck driver	Simon Cowell	Eliminated 4th
Leanne	29	Purchasing administrator	Queen Victoria	Eliminated 5th
Marc	39	Fitness instructor	Prince Charles	Eliminated 6th
Cormac	16	College student	Vladimir Putin	Eliminated 7th
Stephen	32	Cardiac nurse	Russell Brand	Finalist

==== Episode 5 ====
Episode 5 was broadcast on 21 May 2017.

Contestant	Age	Occupation	Celebrity 'Bighead'	Status
Scott	50	Royal Air Force police officer	Henry VIII of England	Eliminated 1st
Rachel	22	Optical assistant	Victoria Beckham	Eliminated 2nd
Kelly	35	Teacher	Taylor Swift	Eliminated 3rd
Karen	48	Hairdresser	Theresa May	Eliminated 4th
James	25	Machine operator	Donald Trump	Eliminated 5th
Craig	37	Painter & decorator	David Beckham	Eliminated 6th
Harry	28	Financial broker	Benedict Cumberbatch	Eliminated 7th
Pete	24	Health & safety manager	Sir Winston Churchill	Finalist

==== Episode 6: Series Final ====
Episode 6 was broadcast on 28 May 2017.

Contestant	Episode won	Celebrity 'Bighead'	Status
Pete	5	Sir Winston Churchill	5th
Aisha	2	Rihanna	4th
Stephen	4	Russell Brand	3rd
Bryan	1	Sir Mo Farah	Second Placed Big Head
Nathan	3	will.i.am	Champion Of Big Heads 2017

== Ratings ==
Title	Original airdate	Ratings (millions)
Episode 1	23 April 2017	2.80
Episode 2	30 April 2017	2.44
Episode 3	7 May 2017	2.30
Episode 4	14 May 2017	1.90
Episode 5	21 May 2017	N/A
Episode 6	28 May 2017	N/A
