= Chris Ramsey (comedian) =

English actor and comedian

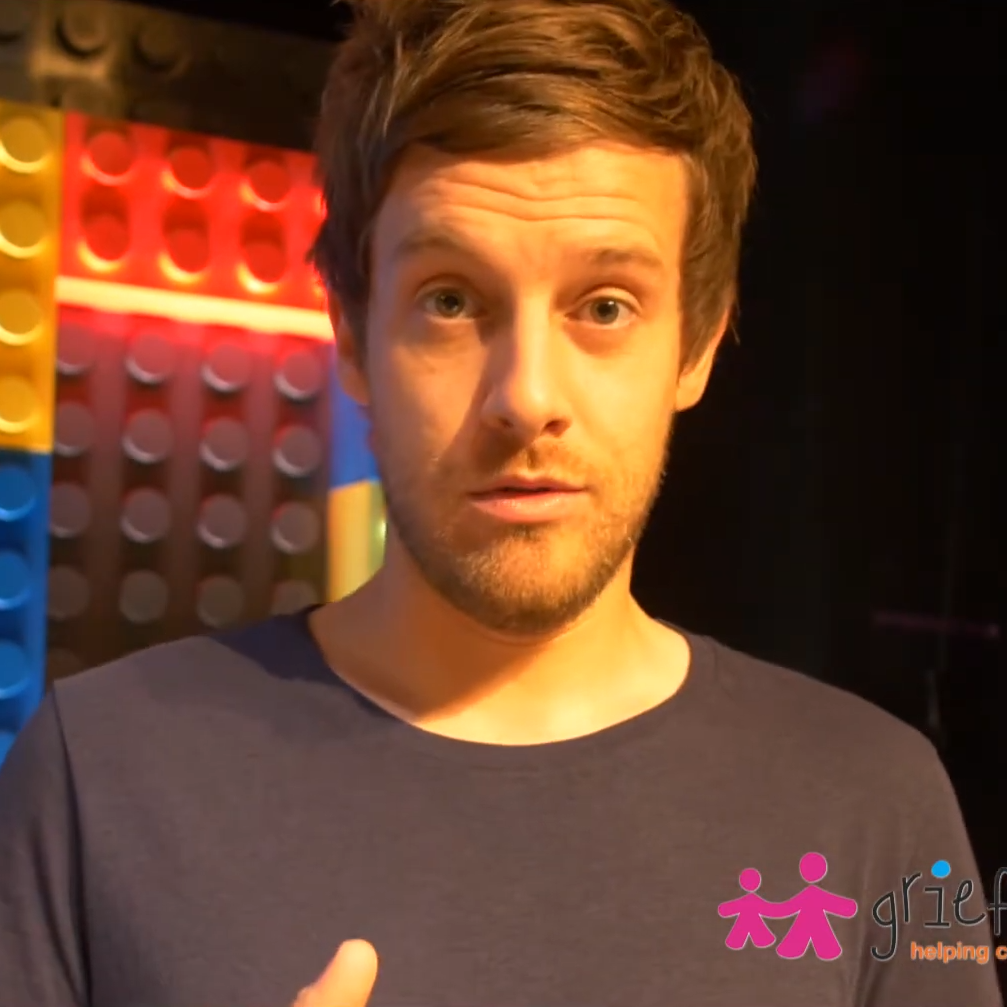
- Ramsey in 2015
- Born: Christopher Ramsey; 3 August 1986 (age 40); South Shields, Tyne and Wear, England
- Years active: 2011–present
- Television: Hebburn; I'm a Celebrity: Extra Camp; Prank Pad; Virtually Famous; Celebrity Juice; Mock the Week; The Chris Ramsey Show; Strictly Come Dancing; Little Mix: The Search; Children in Need
- Spouse: Rosie Winter (m. 2014)
- Children: 2
- Website: chrisramseycomedy.com

Christopher Ramsey (born 3 August 1986) is an English comedian, actor and presenter. After appearing in Hebburn as Jack (2012–2013), Ramsey began presenting series including I'm A Celebrity: Extra Camp (2016), Virtually Famous (2016–2017) and Stand Up Central (2017). In 2017, he began presenting The Chris Ramsey Show, and went on to compete in the seventeenth series of Strictly Come Dancing. In 2020, he presented the BBC talent series Little Mix: The Search. Also since 2020, Ramsey has hosted BBC's Children in Need telethon. Both he and his wife Rosie were featured on the game show Taskmaster.

== Career ==
Ramsey began his career in comedy in 2007 by hosting an open-mic night in Newcastle upon Tyne. In 2008, he was a nominee for the "Chortle Student Comedian of the Year". In 2010, Ramsey took his first solo show, Aggrophobic, to the Edinburgh Festival Fringe. His 2011 show, Offermation, was nominated for an Edinburgh Comedy Award. Offermation was recorded for BBC Radio 4, and broadcast in March 2012. Ramsey's 2012 Edinburgh show was Feeling Lucky which was followed by a national tour. In November 2012 he appeared on Sky 1's Soccer AM as a guest but was removed from the programme for using offensive language twice live on air.

From October 2012 to December 2013, Ramsey starred as Jack Pearson in Jason Cook's BBC Two sitcom Hebburn. The show is set in Hebburn, near to Ramsey's hometown, South Shields. It screened for two series and a Christmas special. In 2014, Ramsey appeared on Live at the Apollo for the first time. In 2015, he took part in the Channel 4 series Time Crashers. In 2016, Ramsey co-presented I'm A Celebrity: Extra Camp on ITV2 alongside Joe Swash, Vicky Pattison and Stacey Solomon. He was replaced by Joel Dommett for the 2017 series. He replaced Kevin McHale as the presenter of Virtually Famous from December 2016. He also presented his own series The Chris Ramsey Show for Comedy Central, beginning January 2017.

Ramsey is a regular fixture at the Funny Way To Be Comedy Club in Barnard Castle, having performed there on eight occasions. In May 2017, it was confirmed that Ramsey would take over from Russell Howard as the host of Stand Up Central, due to Howard being busy with tour commitments.

In March 2020, it was announced that Ramsey would be presenting the BBC talent competition series Little Mix: The Search, which began airing in September 2020.

Also since 2020, Ramsey has hosted BBC's Children in Need telethon, with a selection of other presenters, including Mel Giedroyc, Alex Scott, Stephen Mangan, Ade Adepitan, Graham Norton, Jason Manford, and Lenny Rush.

In 2022, Ramsey took part in the thirteenth series of Taskmaster, finishing as runner-up.

=== Strictly Come Dancing ===
From September 2019, Ramsey competed in the seventeenth series of Strictly Come Dancing, paired with professional dancer Karen Hauer. The couple reached the semi-final and finished in fourth place.

Week	Dance/Song	Judges' score				Total	Result
Week	Dance/Song	Horwood	Mabuse	Ballas	Tonioli	Total	Result
1	Cha-Cha-Cha / "Juice"	3	4	3	3	13	No Elimination
2	Charleston / "Out of Our Heads"	5	7	7	7	26	Safe
3	American Smooth / "Cheek to Cheek"	4	6	6	6	22	Safe
4	Jive / "Saturday Night's Alright for Fighting"	6	7	7	6	26	Safe
5	Quickstep / "Let's Go Crazy"	5	6	7	7^{1}	25	Safe
6	Samba / "Everybody (Backstreet's Back)"	5	6	6	6	23	Safe
7	Street / "Let's Get Ready to Rhumble"	8	9	9	8	34	Safe
8	Tango / "Survivor"	5	7	7	7	26	Safe
9	Salsa / "Uptown Funk"	7	8	9	9	33	Safe
10	Paso Doble / "Run Boy Run"	8	8	8	7	31	Safe
11	Foxtrot / "Consider Yourself"	6	7	8	7	28	Bottom Two
12	Viennese Waltz / "Somebody to Love"; Rumba / "Don't Watch Me Cry"	7; 4	7; 8	6; 8	6; 8	26; 28	Eliminated

^{1}Score awarded by guest judge Alfonso Ribeiro

== Personal life ==
While appearing on Strictly Come Dancing, Ramsey spoke openly about his problems as a teenager, resulting from bad acne, which caused him to take up comedy as a way to deal with his troubles.

Ramsey married Rosie Winter on 25 July 2014 and they have two sons. In 2018, the couple shared via social media that she had had a miscarriage when she was 12 weeks pregnant with their second child. In February 2019, the pair started a weekly podcast, Shagged Married Annoyed, which they co-host from their home. In July 2020, they announced via social media that they were expecting their second child. Their second son was born on 6 January 2021.

== Stand-up shows ==
Year	Title	Notes
2012	Offermation	
2012-14	Feeling Lucky	
2013-14	The Most Dangerous Man on Saturday Morning Television	
2015-16	All Growed Up	
2017	Is That Chris Ramsey?	
2018	The Just Happy to Get Out of the House Tour	
2021-22	20/20	
2026	Here, Man!	

=== DVD releases ===
Title	Released	Notes
Live: All Growed Up	30 November 2015	Live at Newcastle's Tyne Theatre and Opera House
Approval Needed	19 August 2019	Amazon Prime Video special Live at Newcastle's Tyne Theatre and Opera House

== Filmography ==
Year	Title	Role	Notes
2010, 2012	Russell Howard's Good News	Himself - Guest Comedian	Series 2, episode 7; Series 6, episode 12: "Best of Stand-Up"
2011	Show & Tell	Himself - Guest	Series 1, episodes 1, 2 & 6
2011	Richard Bacon's Beer & Pizza Club	Himself - Guest	Series 2, episode 4
2011	Argumental	Himself - Guest	Series 4, episode 2
2011–2013	8 Out of 10 Cats	Himself - Guest Panellist	Series 11, episode 4; Series 15, episodes 3 & 10; Series 16, episode 6
2011–2013	Never Mind the Buzzcocks	Himself - Guest Panellist	Series 25, episode 9; Series 26, episode 5; Series 27, episode 10
2011–2022	Celebrity Juice	Himself - Guest Panellist	Series 1–21 & 26 (46 episodes)
2012	Chris Ramsey's Comedy Fringe	Himself - Host	Television film
2012–2013	Hebburn	Jack Pearson	Main role. Series 1 & 2 (13 episodes)
2012–2013	Mock the Week	Himself - Guest Panellist	Series 11, episode 8; Series 12, episodes 6 & 12
2013	8 Out of 10 Cats Does Countdown	Himself - Contestant	Series 2, episode 4
2013	Celebrity Mastermind	Himself - Contestant	Series 12, episode 3
2013–2015	Sweat the Small Stuff	Himself - Guest Panellist	Series 1, 2 & 4 (7 episodes)
2014	Just for Laughs: All Access	Himself - Guest Comedian	Series 2, episode 3: "Sarah Silverman"
2014	Celebrity Fifteen to One	Himself - Contestant	Series 1, episode 3
2014	A Question of Sport: Super Saturday	Himself - Guest Panellist	Series 1, episode 1
2014	Live at the Apollo	Himself - Guest Comedian	Series 10, episode 2
2014–2017	Virtually Famous	Himself - Guest Panellist / Host	Series 1–4 & Christmas Special (2016) (14 episodes)
2015	Celebrity Squares	Himself - Guest	Series 2, episode 2
2015	The John Bishop Show	Himself - Guest Performer	Series 1, episode 2
2015	Time Crashers	Himself - Participant	Series 1, episodes 1–6
2015	Celebrity Benchmark	Himself - Contestant	Series 1, episode 2
2015	The Royal Variety Performance	Himself - Guest Performer	Television Special
2016	Drunk History: UK	Drunk Storyteller	Series 2, episode 2: "Scott of the Antarctic / Sinking of the Titanic"
2016	Lip Sync Battle UK	Himself - Contestant	Series 1, episode 7: "Aston Merrygold vs. Chris Ramsey"
2016	Extra Gear	Himself - Guest	Series 1, episode 1
2016	It's Not Me, It's You	Himself - Panellist	Series 1, episodes 2, 4 & 6
2016	Celebrity Storage Hunters	Himself - Participant	Series 1, episode 5: "Cambridge"
2016	I'm a Celebrity: Extra Camp	Himself - Co-presenter	Series 1, episodes 1–20
2017	Murder on the Blackpool Express	Medic 2	Television film
2017	Richard Osman's House of Games	Himself - Contestant	Series 1, episodes 11–15
2017	The Chase: Celebrity Special	Himself - Contestant	Series 6, episode 15
2017	Chris Ramsey's Stand Up Central	Himself - Host	Series 1, episodes 1–8
2017–2018	The Chris Ramsey Show	Himself - Host	Series 1 & 2 (18 episodes)
2018	Death on the Tyne	PA Announcer (voice)	Television film
2018	Lego Masters	Himself - Guest Judge	Series 2, episode 3
2018–2023	Children in Need	Himself - Co-host	Television Specials
2019	Celebrity Gogglebox	Himself - Participant	Series 1, episode 3
2019	Chris Ramsey Approval Needed	Himself - Performer	Television Special
2019	Comedians Giving Lectures	Himself - Guest Speaker	Series 1, episode 5
2019	Strictly Come Dancing	Himself - Contestant	Series 17 (25 episodes)
2019–2021	The One Show	Himself - Presenter	Series 15 (10 episodes)
2020	Alan Carr's Epic Gameshow	Himself - Contestant	Series 1, episode 1: "Play Your Cards Right Celebrity Special"
2020	Tipping Point: Lucky Stars	Himself - Contestant	Series 6, episode 4
2020	Little Mix: The Search	Himself - Host	Series 1, episodes 1 & 7–9
2020	The Crystal Maze	Himself - Adventurer	Series 9, episode 8: "Celebrities"
2021	Celebrity Catchphrase	Himself - Contestant	Series 5, episode 2
2021	Ant & Dec's Saturday Night Takeaway	Himself - Guest	Series 17, episode 4
2021	The Wheel	Himself - Guest 'Expert'	Series 2, episode 2
2021	A League of Their Own	Himself - Guest Panellist	Series 16, episode 5
2021–2022	CBeebies Bedtime Stories	Himself - Storyteller	Series 1, episodes 797, 802 & 807
2021, 2023	The Graham Norton Show	Himself - Guest (with Rosie)	Series 29, episode 9; Series 31, episode 7
2021–2023	The Chris & Rosie Ramsey Show	Himself - Co-host	Series 1 & 2 (13 episodes)
2022	Taskmaster	Himself - Contestant	Series 13, episodes 1–10
2023	Buffering	'Knit-Off' Announcer (voice)	Series 2, episode 1: "The House Party"
2023	Michael McIntyre's Big Show	Himself - Guest	Series 6, episode 3
2023	The Lateish Show with Mo Gilligan	Himself - Guest	Series 4, episode 1
2023	Who Do You Think You Are?	Himself - Participant	Series 20, episode 8: "Chris Ramsey"
2023	Shopping with Keith Lemon	Himself - Special Guest	Series 4, episode 5: "Chris & Rosie Ramsey and Myleene Klass"
2026	Gladiators: Celebrity Special	Himself - Contestant	One episode
