= Daisy & Ollie =

Children's animated television series

- Genre: Children's; Animated
- Created by: Helen Brown
- Voices of: Jason Manford; Sarah Hadland; Claire Morgan
- Composer: Keith Hopwood
- Country of origin: United Kingdom
- Original language: English
- No. of episodes: 52 (105 segments)

Production
- Producer: Helen Brown
- Production companies: OddBot Inc. Hoopla Animation; Arush Entertainment

Original release
- Network: Cartoonito (2017–2022); Channel 5 (2020–present)
- Release: 6 November 2017 – present

Daisy & Ollie is a British children's animated television series for preschoolers produced by Hoopla Animation Limited and Arush Entertainment for Cartoonito and Channel 5's Milkshake! block. The show follows the daily life of two young children named Daisy and Ollie, along with Daisy's father, Boo the purple monkey and Whizzy the toy robot. As of 8 March 2021, new episodes have also appeared concurrently on Channel 5.

== Format ==
In each episode, the characters have a day at Daisy's house and during each of their life situations, Daisy (Sarah Hadland) and Ollie (Claire Morgan) ask Daisy’s father (Jason Manford) a question (said question is also the title of each episode). After they've found out the answer to this question, they sing the Questions song and Daisy's father gives advice to the viewers about the question and signs off.

In some episodes, there are special guest appearances from other famous TV stars like Paddy McGuinness, Kirsty McKay, Paul Grunert, and Romesh Ranganathan, along with Take That member and performer Gary Barlow, all appearing as cartoon caricatures of themselves.
