= Virtually Famous =

British television series

- Chris Stark, Kevin Mchale, Seann Walsh
- Genre: Comedy panel game
- Written by: James Menzies; Henry Paker
- Directed by: Toby Baker
- Presented by: Kevin McHale (2014–2016); Chris Ramsey (2016–2017)
- Starring: Seann Walsh; Chris Stark (2014–2016); Vicky Pattison (2016–2017); Scarlett Moffatt (2016–2017)
- Country of origin: United Kingdom
- Original language: English
- No. of series: 4
- No. of episodes: 36

Production
- Executive producers: Dan Baldwin; Leon Wilson
- Producers: Toby Brack; Juliet Morrish
- Production locations: Riverside Studios (2014); Elstree Studios (2015—17)
- Editors: Steve Nayler; Dan Isitt
- Running time: 45–60 minutes (inc. adverts)
- Production companies: Hungry Bear Media; Talkback

Original release
- Network: E4
- Release: 21 July 2014 – 7 February 2017

Virtually Famous is a British comedy panel game show hosted for three series from 2014 to 2016 by Kevin Mchale and hosted for one series in 2017 by Chris Ramsey. In each episode, two teams of three panelists answer questions and complete tasks related to viral videos on the internet and the two team captains were Seann Walsh and Chris Stark. In series 4, the final series, Vicky Pattison took over from Chris Stark as team captain.

The programme made its debut on E4 on 21 July 2014 and on 26 November 2014, it was announced that the show had been recommissioned for a second and third series.

== Format ==
The two teams are shown viral videos from the internet and then asked questions about them as well as having to act out tasks in the same way that they're being done in the videos. In one segment they are shown three videos and an actual person from one of the videos appears in the studio and the teams then have to guess which of the three videos that this person appeared in. The format for the show was very similar to Never Mind the Buzzcocks where the goal of winning the show with the most points is secondary to the creation of comedic dialogue between the guests.

== Transmissions ==
Series	Start date	End date	Episodes
1	21 July 2014	8 September 2014	8
2	13 April 2015	15 June 2015	10
3	19 January 2016	22 March 2016	10
4	20 December 2016	7 February 2017	8

== Episodes ==
The coloured backgrounds denote the result of each of the shows:

– indicates Chris/Vicky's team won.
– indicates Seann's team won.
– indicates the game ended in a draw.

=== Series 1 (2014) ===
Episode	First broadcast	Chris' team	Seann's team	Scores
1x01	21 July 2014	Romesh Ranganathan and Rachel Riley	Tyger Drew-Honey and Chris Ramsey	3–6
1x02	28 July 2014	Katherine Ryan and David Haye	Helen Flanagan and Joe Lycett	5–2
1x03	4 August 2014	James Acaster and Kimberly Wyatt	Alex Brooker and Jameela Jamil	4–107
1x04	11 August 2014	Chris Ramsey and Emily Atack	Scott Mills and Bobby Mair	4–2
1x05	18 August 2014	Romesh Ranganathan and Stacey Solomon	Tom Rosenthal, Bradley Simpson and Tristan Evans	5–4
1x06	25 August 2014	James Acaster and Pixie Lott	Troy Von Scheibner and Aisling Bea	0–2
1x07	1 September 2014	Russell Kane and Cheska Hull	Sharon Rooney and Ed Gamble	6–5
1x08	8 September 2014	Gemma Merna and Rob Beckett	Alex Mytton and Yasmine Akram	7–3

=== Series 2 (2015) ===
Episode	First broadcast	Chris' team	Seann's team	Scores
2x01	13 April 2015	Ellie Taylor and Mark-Francis Vandelli	Alex Brooker and Dappy	3–2
2x02	20 April 2015	Rob Beckett and Tyler Oakley	Stacey Solomon and Bobby Mair	4–2
2x03	27 April 2015	Chris Ramsey and Laura Whitmore	Rhys James and Jimmy Bullard	7–3
2x04	4 May 2015	Rob Beckett and Rylan Clark	Tom Davis and Sarah Callaghan	3–1
2x05	11 May 2015	Denise van Outen and Dane Baptiste	Bobby Mair and Louis Smith	6–11
2x06	18 May 2015	Chris Ramsey and James Sutton	Joey Essex and Katherine Ryan	2–4
2x07	25 May 2015	Roisin Conaty and Russell Kane	Alex Brooker and Joe Swash	4–3
2x08	1 June 2015	Joe Lycett and Sam Faiers	Jake Wood and Nish Kumar	2–19
2x09	8 June 2015	Charlotte Crosby, Jack and Dean	David Haye and Ivo Graham	2–5
2x10	15 June 2015	Alexandra Felstead and Russell Kane	Spencer Matthews and David Morgan	2–1

=== Series 3 (2016) ===
Episode	First broadcast	Chris' team	Seann's team	Scores
3x01	19 January 2016	Jay Hutton and Jimmy Carr	Jamie Laing and Ellie Taylor	3–5
3x02	26 January 2016	Rylan Clark-Neal and Cariad Lloyd	Jennifer Metcalfe and Bobby Mair	4–1
3x03	2 February 2016	Catherine Tyldesley and Russell Kane	Lee Ryan and Chris Ramsey	4–5
3x04	9 February 2016	Rachel Riley and Katherine Ryan	Vicky Pattison and Sam Simmons	6–0
3x05	16 February 2016	Joey Essex and Chris Ramsey	Sharon Rooney and Eddie Kadi	6–3
3x06	23 February 2016	Stacey Solomon and Jason Byrne	Joe Swash and Alex Brooker	7–6
3x07	1 March 2016	Scarlett Moffatt and Chris Ramsey	Arg and David Morgan	4–3
3x08	8 March 2016	Gemma Collins and Alex Brooker	Will Mellor and Tez Ilyas	5–6
3x09	15 March 2016	Jameela Jamil and Romesh Ranganathan	Thomas Turgoose and Suzi Ruffell	8–1
3x10	22 March 2016	Binky Felstead and Russell Kane	Mark-Francis Vandelli and Dane Baptiste	4–1

=== Series 4 (2016–2017) ===
Episode	First broadcast	Vicky's team	Seann and Scarlett's team	Scores
4x01	20 December 2016 (Note: Christmas special)	Jason Byrne, Jay Hutton and Paisley Billings	Jamie Laing	
4x02	27 December 2016	Bobby Mair and Will Mellor	Shayne Ward	
4x03	3 January 2017	Tom Allen and Spencer Matthews	Danielle Armstrong	
4x04	10 January 2017	Iain Stirling and Sketch	Stephanie Pratt and Brooke Vincent (Note: Scarlett Moffatt was unable to attend the recording of this episode.)	
4x05	17 January 2017	Russell Kane and Jordan Stephens	Joey Essex	
4x06	24 January 2017	Ellie Taylor and James and Ola Jordan	Will Best and Megan McKenna	
4x07	31 January 2017	Dane Baptiste and Jimmy Carr	Binky Felstead and Joel Dommett	
4x08	7 February 2017 (Note: Tattoo Fixers vs Virtually Famous special)	Jay Hutton, Sketch and Paisley Billings	Vicky Pattison	

== Scores ==
Chris	Vicky	Seann
Series wins (0 drawn)
3		0
3	0	0
Episode wins (0 drawn)
18		10
18	0	10
