= A Different Stage (album) =

Studio album by Jason Manford
- Released: 6 October 2017
- Recorded: 2017
- Genre: Show tunes
- Length: 40:47
- Label: Decca Records
- Producer: James Morgan; Juliette Pochin

A Different Stage is the debut studio album by English comedian and actor Jason Manford. The album was released on 6 October 2017 by Decca Records. It features some of Manford's favourite show tunes.

== Background ==
It was announced in July 2017 that Manford would be releasing an album of show tunes inspired by his stage career, and that the album would be released in October. The album was released on 6 October. As part of the album's launch, Manford attended a signing event at HMV in Manchester's Arndale Centre. The album is dedicated to his paternal grandparents: "who every Sunday at their house would play so many old songs and tunes from musicals that they became ingrained in my own musical taste to this day".

Upon the release of A Different Stage, Manford announced plans for a music tour in 2018, consisting of "a handful of gigs of me with an orchestra going through songs on the album".

During recording of the album, Manford travelled to Prague to record with the Prague Symphony Orchestra.

== Track listing ==
No.	Title	Length
1.	"Stars" (from Les Miserables)	3:16
2.	"Anthem" (from Chess)	3:09
3.	"Hushabye Mountain" (from Chitty Chitty Bang Bang) (featuring Rosanna Bates)	2:53
4.	"On the Street Where You Live" (from My Fair Lady)	2:21
5.	"It's Impossible"	3:09
6.	"Falling Slowly" (from Once) (featuring Kate Rusby)	4:16
7.	"As If We Never Said Goodbye" (from Sunset Boulevard)	4:48
8.	"This Is My Life" (by Shirley Bassey)	4:01
9.	"The Impossible Dream" (from Man of La Mancha)	2:29
10.	"This Is the Moment" (from Jekyll and Hyde)	3:59
11.	"I Have Dreamed" (from The King and I)	2:37
12.	"Carrickfergus"	3:59
Total length:		40:47

== Charts ==
Chart (2017)	Peak position
Scottish Albums (OCC)	9
UK Albums (OCC)	10
