= Harriet Kemsley =

English stand-up comedian (born 1987)

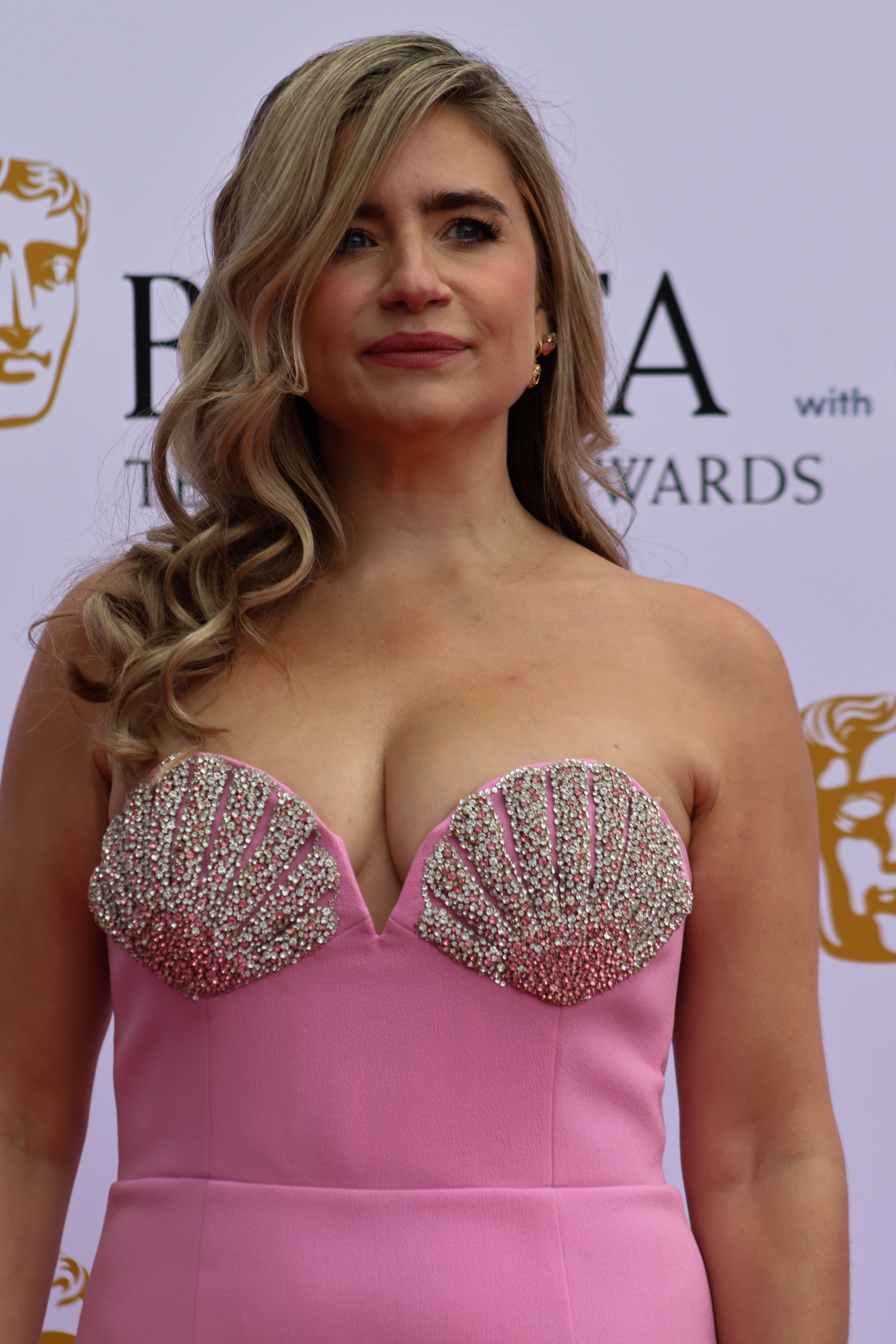
- Kemsley in 2026
- Born: 21 June 1987 (age 39); Canterbury, Kent, England
- Education: Kingston University
- Occupation: Comedian
- Years active: 2011–present
- Spouse: Bobby Mair (m. 2017; div. 2024)
- Children: 1
- Website: harrietkemsley.com

Harriet Kemsley (born 21 June 1987) is an English stand-up comedian.

== Early life ==
Kemsley grew up in Canterbury, Kent. She studied English literature at Kingston University.

== Career ==
Kemsley began stand-up in 2011 and within months won the Funny's Funny contest. In 2012, she won Bath Comedy Festival New Act of the Year and Brighton Comedy Festival New Act of the Year and was named by Rhod Gilbert as one of the Ten Must See Comics of 2012. Her autobiographical solo show, Slutty Joan, was reviewed positively in The Guardian.

From 2018 to 2022 she hosted a podcast, Why Is Harriet Crying?, with fellow comedian Sunil Patel.

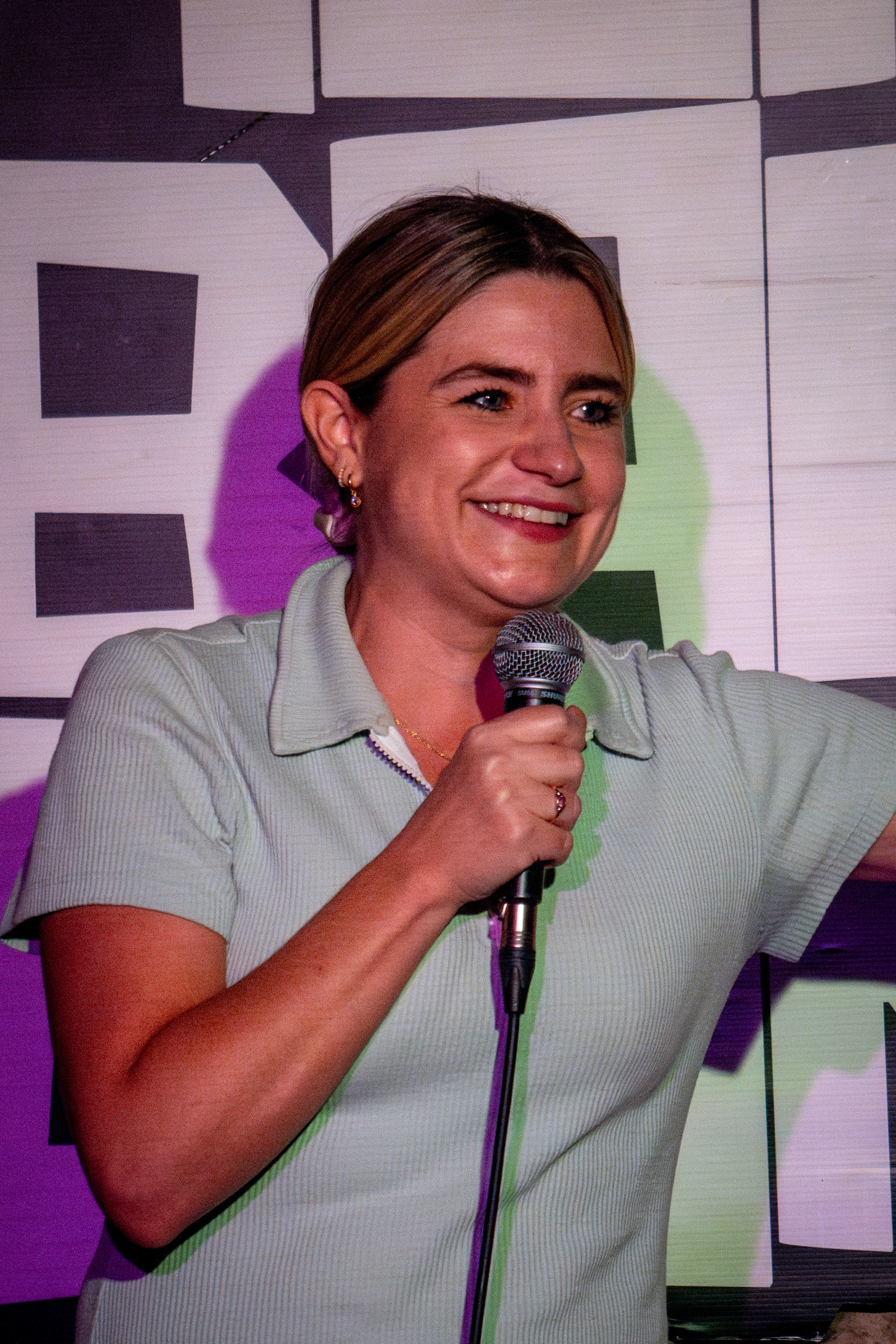
Kemsley in 2024

Kemsley has appeared on Sam Delaney's News Thing, Roast Battle, 8 Out of 10 Cats Does Countdown and 8 Out of 10 Cats. She and then-fiancé Bobby Mair appeared on a Viceland reality show in 2017, entitled Bobby & Harriet Get Married, featuring their wedding, officiated by comedian Romesh Ranganathan.

As an actress, she has appeared in the film Bonobo, and on TV in Damned and Doctor Foster. She also provided the voice of Nashandra, the final boss of the video game Dark Souls II.

In March 2025, she starred in the first series of LOL: Last One Laughing UK, hosted by Jimmy Carr and Roisin Conaty.

== Personal life ==
In her twenties, Kemsley shared a house with comedian Rosie Holt.

Kemsley married fellow comedian Bobby Mair in 2017. They have one daughter, born in 2021. She used a stand-up set broadcast on 19 April 2024 as part of the last episode of The Now Show and The Jonathan Ross Show on 7 February 2026, S.23, Ep.1, to announce that she had completed her no-fault divorce, and uses the dating app Hinge. She has dyspraxia (which she describes as clumsiness) and polyendocrine metabolic ovarian syndrome (PMOS). She follows a vegan diet.
