= Bonobo (2014 film) =

2014 film by Matthew Hammett Knott

- Theatrical release poster
- Directed by: Matthew Hammett Knott
- Written by: Matthew Hammett Knott; Joanna Benecke
- Produced by: Farhana Bhula
- Starring: Tessa Peake-Jones; Josie Lawrence; James Norton; Eleanor Wyld; Carolyn Pickles; Patricia Potter; Orlando Seale; Harriet Kemsley; Milton Lopes; Will Tudor
- Cinematography: James Aspinall
- Edited by: Sean Barton
- Music by: Eugene Feygelson
- Production company: Fable Films
- Distributed by: MonteCristo International
- Release dates: 25 September 2014 (Raindance Film Festival); 5 December 2014 (United Kingdom)
- Running time: 83 minutes
- Country: United Kingdom
- Language: English

Bonobo is a 2014 British comedy-drama film co-written and directed by Matthew Hammett Knott and starring Tessa Peake-Jones, Josie Lawrence, James Norton, Eleanor Wyld, Carolyn Pickles, Patricia Potter, Orlando Seale, Harriet Kemsley, Milton Lopes and Will Tudor.

The film is about middle-aged widow Judith (Peake-Jones) and her attempts to convince her daughter Lily to leave an alternative commune and return to university. Bonobo premiered at the Raindance Film Festival, where it was nominated for Best British Feature.

== Plot ==
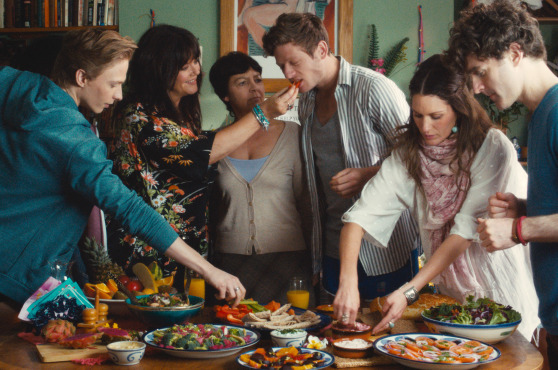
Members of Bonobo House share a meal

Middle-aged widow Judith is worried about her 23-year-old daughter Lily, who has joined what she thinks is a sect. In fact, a group of youngsters overseen by middle-aged Anita have set up a commune based on the lifestyle of the Bonobo chimpanzee (Pan paniscus), in which all social conflicts are resolved by having sex.

Deciding that she'll ‘rescue’ Lily, Judith turns up at the commune, only to be told that she'll have to wait until she's in the right state of mind to talk to her daughter. Judith herself starts opening up, but at a party rejects Anita's advances. Back home, Lily tells her mother that she has to be true to herself. Judith admits her formerly hidden desires and tells Lily she is going to let her decide her future for herself.

Meanwhile, sex itself becomes a problem for the group, and one member is asked to leave. When mother and daughter return to the commune, Judith is able to show her feelings for Anita. A young woman, a neighbour, arrives and is welcomed by the group. As everyone hugs and welcomes her, Judith says, "I'll leave you to it", then she turns and slowly, quietly leaves and walks away.

== Cast ==
- Tessa Peake-Jones as Judith
- Josie Lawrence as Anita
- James Norton as Ralph
- Eleanor Wyld as Lily
- Will Tudor as Toby
- Orlando Seale as Malcolm
- Carolyn Pickles as Celia
- Patricia Potter as Sandra
- Milton Lopes as Peter
- Harriet Kemsley as Helen

== Production ==
Bonobo was privately financed and shot on location in Wimborne Minster, Dorset.

== Reception ==
Bonobo received positive reviews from critics. Total Film gave it four stars calling it "smart, funny and original", while Tim Robey of The Daily Telegraph called it "frisky, liberated, funny, alive".
