= A Question of Sport: Super Saturday =

- Genre: Comedy and sport
- Presented by: Jason Manford; Helen Skelton
- Starring: Phil Tufnell; Matt Dawson
- Country of origin: United Kingdom
- Original language: English
- No. of series: 1
- No. of episodes: 5

Production
- Executive producer: Kieron Collins
- Producer: Gareth Edwards
- Production locations: dock10, MediaCityUK
- Running time: 40 minutes

Original release
- Network: BBC One
- Release: 21 June – 19 July 2014

Related
- A Question of Sport

A Question of Sport: Super Saturday (often shortened to Super Saturday) is a British television programme which was a spin-off from the long-running quiz show A Question of Sport.

Super Saturday was hosted by comedian Jason Manford, with Helen Skelton on pre-recorded rounds, and began airing on 21 June 2014 on BBC One. The show received a large amount of negative reviews from critics, and after just one series it was cancelled.

== Production ==
The show was recorded at dock10, MediaCityUK on 5 and 6 June 2014, with more than one episode being recorded each day.

== Episodes ==
The coloured backgrounds denote the result of each of the shows:

– indicates Matt's team won.
– indicates Phil's team won.

No.	Matt's team	Phil's team	Score	Original release date
1	Chris Ramsey, Ola Jordan	Louie Spence, Shappi Khorsandi	9–5	21 June 2014
2	Seann Walsh, Sharron Davies	Patrick Robinson, Iwan Thomas	10–3	28 June 2014
3	Katherine Ryan, Ted Robbins	Michael Vaughan, Lizzy Yarnold	6–4	5 July 2014
4	Louise Minchin, Anton du Beke	Gethin Jones, Rebecca Adlington	8–9	12 July 2014
5	Pixie Lott, Terry Alderton	Helen Skelton, Adil Ray	5–7	19 July 2014

== Criticism ==
The show received complaints over its similarity to the game show A League of Their Own and the fact that a large number of guests were all from BBC programmes. The show was largely panned by critics and was cancelled after just one series.
