= Murder on the Blackpool Express =

- Genre: Comedy-drama; Crime drama Mystery
- Written by: Jason Cook
- Directed by: Simon Delaney
- Starring: Johnny Vegas; Sian Gibson; Sheila Reid; Una Stubbs; Katy Cavanagh; Nina Wadia; Kimberley Nixon; Nigel Havers; Griff Rhys Jones; Susie Blake; Kevin Eldon
- Country of origin: United Kingdom
- Original language: English

Production
- Producer: Jim Poyser
- Running time: 91 minutes

Original release
- Network: Gold
- Release: 11 November 2017

Murder on the Blackpool Express is a 2017 comedy drama television film created by Jason Cook. Starring Johnny Vegas, Sian Gibson, Sheila Reid, Una Stubbs (in her final role), Griff Rhys Jones, Nina Wadia, Nigel Havers, Kimberley Nixon and Kevin Eldon.

Broadcast in 2017, it became Gold's highest-rated show at the time, later rebroadcast on BBC Two.

Its success saw the production of two sequels entitled Death on the Tyne (2018) and Dial M for Middlesbrough (2019), and an ongoing series Murder They Hope.

== Synopsis ==
Old-age pensioners and mystery novel fans are on a budget bus tour to visit all the murder locations in a novel series, led by the books' author. Members of the tour start turning up dead and the police initially discount the deaths as accidents, leaving the tour guests to fend for themselves. The title is a parody of Murder on the Orient Express.

== Cast ==
- Johnny Vegas as Terry
- Sian Gibson as Gemma Draper
- Una Stubbs as Peggy
- Sheila Reid as Mildred
- Kimberley Nixon as Laura Bishop
- Nina Wadia as Moira Colliston
- Nigel Havers as Doc
- Kevin Eldon as Kevin
- Mark Heap as Graham
- Katy Cavanagh as Grace
- Matthew Cottle as George
- Javone Prince as Ben
- Griff Rhys Jones as David
- Susie Blake as Marge Grimshaw
- Jason Cook as Arcade Attendant
- Layla Cook as Young Laura Bishop
- Catherine Harvey as Mary
- Steve Brody as Barry
- Peter Singh as PC Collins
- Chris Anderson as Medic 1
- Chris Ramsey as Medic 2

== Production ==
Locations include "Bartleby Cathedral" (Ascot Priory), a stately home "Clesperley Manor" (Stoke Court), a scenic country park with a cliff: Castle Rock, Nether Alderley, Alderley Edge, United Kingdom and Blackpool: tower, ballroom, seafront.

== Sequels and spin-offs ==
In December 2018, a sequel, Death on the Tyne (a spoof of another Hercule Poirot story by Agatha Christie, 'Death on the Nile'), aired on Gold, followed by a third film titled Dial M for Middlesbrough (a play on Alfred Hitchcock’s Dial M for Murder) the following year.

In May 2021, Murder They Hope (this time parodying the series Murder She Wrote), a three-part follow-up series, aired on Gold as well. Lee Mack appeared in the last episode as the character Willy Watkins.

Its success prompted the airing of a second series, Murder They Hope Too with Mack reprising his role as Watkins.

A 2023 Christmas Special Blood Actually guest starred Martin Kemp, Peter Davison and Robert Webb.

== Episode Guide ==
No.	Title	Directed by	Written by	Original release date	UK viewers (millions)
2	"Death on the Tyne"	Ed Bye	Jason Cook	15 December 2018	N/A
3	"Dial M for Middlesbrough"	Ed Bye	Jason Cook	14 December 2019	N/A
4	"The Bunny Trap"	Ed Bye	Jason Cook	8 May 2021	N/A
5	"Evil Under the Bun"	Adam Jenkins	Jason Cook	15 May 2021	N/A
6	"Dales of the Unexpected"	Ed Bye	Jason Cook	22 May 2021	N/A
7	"Can't See Blood for the Trees"	Sarmad Mashud	Jason Cook	24 October 2022	N/A
8	"A Midsummer Night's Scream"	Ed Bye	Jason Cook	25 October 2022	N/A
9	"The Unusual Suspects"	Ed Bye	Jason Cook	26 October 2022	N/A
10	"Blood Actually"	Ed Bye	Jason Cook	16 December 2023	N/A
11	"Apocalypse Slough"	Ed Bye	Jason Cook	26 September 2024	N/A
