= Unbeatable (game show) =

- Genre: Quiz show
- Presented by: Jason Manford
- Country of origin: United Kingdom
- Original language: English
- No. of series: 2
- No. of episodes: 95

Production
- Running time: 30–45 minutes
- Production companies: 12 Yard, Possessed and BBC Scotland

Original release
- Network: BBC One; BBC Two
- Release: 10 May 2021 – 12 May 2023

Related
- The Answer Run

Unbeatable is a British quiz show that had aired on BBC One and BBC Two from 10 May 2021 to 12 May 2023, hosted by Jason Manford. On each episode, four contestants compete to accumulate and win prize money by choosing the best answers to questions and matching them against each other.

== Format ==
All questions used during the game have six answer choices, which are secretly ranked as to how close they are to meeting the criterion stated. A sample question might be: "Which of these politicians is the youngest?" with these answer choices:

- Joe Biden (b. 1942) - 6th
- Justin Trudeau (b. 1971) - 2nd
- Boris Johnson (b. 1964) - 3rd
- Angela Merkel (b. 1954) - 4th
- Leo Varadkar (b. 1979) - 1st
- Vladimir Putin (b. 1952) - 5th

The top-ranked answer is referred to as "unbeatable."

=== Round 1 (Moneymaker) ===
Each contestant in turn is asked one question and chooses the answer they believe is unbeatable. If they are confident in their choice, they may press a button within three seconds to take an all-or-nothing gamble, receiving £1,000 if they are correct or nothing otherwise. Not pressing the button gives the contestant a chance to match their chosen answer against the other five, one at a time and in any desired order. The contestant wins £100 every time their answer outranks ("beats") another and may stop whenever they wish, but having their answer beaten forfeits all the money.

=== Round 2 (Head to Head) ===
The highest-scoring contestant chooses one opponent to battle; in case of a tie for high score, a random draw determines who will have priority. The two contestants are asked a question and must each choose one answer, and the first to press their button (if any) locks in their guess as unbeatable. A correct lock-in awards £1,000 and wins the board, while a miss gives £100 and the board to the opponent.

If neither contestant presses their button, the face-off proceeds to a series of battles, with two victories required to win the board. The contestant with the higher-ranked answer wins £100 and the first battle. Each contestant then chooses a new answer, with a further £100 at stake, and a third such battle is then played if necessary.

The first contestant to win two boards advances to Round 3, while their opponent is eliminated and forfeits their money. The remaining two contestants then face each other under the same rules.

Initial control of the board alternates between contestants, starting with the high scorer. The opponent of that contestant gets first choice of the remaining four answers if the board is not immediately decided, and the one in control chooses first if a third battle is needed.

=== Round 3 (The Decider) ===
The contestants are asked a question and must alternate choosing one answer at a time. The one who finds the unbeatable answer wins the board and money: £1,000 for finding it immediately, reduced by £200 for each incorrect guess. If the unbeatable answer is not found after five guesses, the contestant who did not have initial control wins the board but does not receive any money. The first contestant to win two boards advances to the Final.

Initial control alternates between contestants, starting with the high scorer.

=== Final ===
The contestant is shown a set of six answers and chooses one of two questions to play using them. After selecting a question and one answer, they must match it against one other answer at a time in any desired order. The contestant wins half their bank for beating two answers, the entire bank for beating four, or double the bank if their answer is unbeatable. They may stop after reaching either of the first two prize levels; however, if their answer is beaten, the round ends and they leave with nothing.

If the contestant chooses to stop, the remainder of the board is played out to see if they would have been able to increase their winnings.

== Transmissions ==
Series	Episodes		Originally released	
Series	Episodes		First released	Last released
1	50	25	10 May 2021	11 June 2021
1	50	25	30 August 2021	1 October 2021
2	45	15	5 September 2022	23 September 2022
2	45	30	3 April 2023	12 May 2023
