= Shagged Married Annoyed =

British comedy podcast

- Genre: Comedy
- Language: English

Cast and voices
- Hosted by: Chris Ramsey; Rosie Ramsey

Music
- Opening theme: We Had a Fight About the Jingle

Production
- Production: Avalon; Acast
- Length: Approx. 60 minutes

Publication
- No. of episodes: 338 (as of 1 August 2025)
- Original release: 15 February 2019
- Provider: Acast

Reception
- Ratings: 4.9/5

Related
- Website: www.shaggedmarriedannoyed.com/podcast

Shagged Married Annoyed (or Sh**ged Married Annoyed) is a British comedy podcast hosted by married couple Chris and Rosie Ramsey. In the podcast the couple discuss "life, relationships, arguments, annoyances, parenting, growing up and everything in between." The first episode was released on iTunes and Spotify on 15 February 2019. By May 2020, the podcast had reached 25 million downloads worldwide. As of April 2022, it has had more than 100 million downloads. The show was announced as one of the most popular podcasts in the UK in 2020 in Spotify's annual Wrapped feature.

Chris and Rosie Ramsey published the book Sh**ged. Married. Annoyed. in September 2020 following the success of the podcast. It became a Sunday Times Bestseller. They announced that they would be going on tour with the podcast in 2020, but the initial run was postponed to 2021 due to the COVID-19 pandemic. A second leg of the tour was announced for autumn 2023.

== Format and production ==
The title of the podcast is a play on the BBC Three programme Snog Marry Avoid?. The format features free-flowing discussion between Chris and Rosie, along with regular segments including answering questions from the public and sharing 'beefs' they have with each other. The episodes are recorded in the couple's home kitchen. Each episode begins with a theme tune recorded by the couple called "We had a fight about the jingle".

=== Recurring segments ===
- What's Your Beef?
- Rosie's Mysteries
- Questions from the Public
- Celebrity Questions

=== Production changes ===
On 26 March 2020, podcast company Acast announced that Shagged Married Annoyed had joined the Acast Creator Network, bringing it alongside other British comedy podcasts including Off Menu with Ed Gamble and James Acaster and My Dad Wrote a Porno. Shagged Married Annoyed is produced by Avalon and is released weekly on Fridays.

On 4 July 2025, video versions of the podcast started airing on YouTube alongside regular audio versions on all other platforms.

== Reception ==
Shagged Married Annoyed has regularly made it to the top of the Apple Podcasts charts. As of November 2021, it has received over 39,000 ratings with an average of 4.9 out of 5 stars.

=== Awards ===
Shagged Married Annoyed won Best Podcast at the 2020 Global Awards. It won the Listeners' Choice Award at the British Podcast Awards 2020 with a record total of 229,000 public votes, along with a bronze award for Best New Podcast. It also won a bronze award for Funniest Show at the 2020 ARIAS. On 21 April 2021, Shagged Married Annoyed was announced as a nominee for Best Independent Podcast in the 2021 ARIAS.

In March 2022, it won the Best Comedy Podcast in the National Comedy Awards 2021. The podcast won the award again at the 2023 National Comedy Awards in February 2023.

=== Critical reception ===
Hannah J Davies of The Guardian described the podcast as a "comforting, craic-filled show" that "is not to be underestimated". The Radio Times included Shagged Married Annoyed in their 'Best podcasts to listen to in 2021' describing it as "excellent light-hearted listening." In a review for The Times, James Marriott gave the podcast two out of five stars, calling it "cringey with effortful banter".

== Book ==
In January 2020, Chris and Rosie Ramsey announced that they would be writing a book based on their podcast. Sh**ged. Married. Annoyed. was published by Penguin imprint Michael Joseph on 3 September 2020 who described it as "relatable guide that explores the highs and lows of dating, relationships, marriage and everything in between." The book became a Sunday Times No.1 bestseller in the first week of its release.

== Tour ==
In February 2020, Chris and Rosie Ramsey announced that they would be taking the podcast on a live tour in eight venues across the UK during September that year. They also said that they would aim to break the record for the biggest live podcast audience at their show in the Utilita Arena, Newcastle. They broke the record within 60 minutes of tickets going on sale, including 9,028 tickets at Utilita Arena and over 19,000 sales for the tour in total. Due to popular demand, new dates were added to the tour on 6 March 2020.

In July 2020, it was announced that the tour would be postponed until 2021 due to the COVID-19 pandemic. Due to increased demand, in April 2021 the couple announced that they were adding over 110,000 extra tickets to their tour across nine additional venues, including the O2 Arena, London.

The live show features the regular podcast segment 'What's your beef?', a discussion with fictional characters Barry and Belinda Beef, and a segment where Chris and Rosie read stories from the audience.

In a review for the Evening Standard, Bruce Dessau described the show as "an evening of crowdpleasing, undemanding, relatable laughs." Brian Logan of The Guardian praised Chris and Rosie's charms as hosts and called the show a "mildly amusing night out".

== Episodes ==
Episode	Title	Release date
1	Three's a crowd, four's a chore	15 February 2019
2	Hungry eyes and a first date surprise	22 February 2019
3	Episode three, take two.	1 March 2019
4	Don't touch my bum, I'm a celebrity Mum	8 March 2019
5	Widowed by a Seagull	15 March 2019
6	Let's see shall we	22 March 2019
7	Shredded Beef	29 March 2019
8	Diplomatic Immunity	5 April 2019
9	Wine and a FAB time	12 April 2019
10	Who let the cats in?	19 April 2019
11	Floss before you flirt	26 April 2019
12	Caravan of love	3 May 2019
13	Bed time stand off	10 May 2019
14	A pre-marriage thing?	17 May 2019
15	Our safe word is...	24 May 2019
16	Fanny by the gaslight	31 May 2019
17	The square root of sex	7 June 2019
18	Fetch the bang pillow!	14 June 2019
19	Out of Office Reply	21 June 2019
20	Worrying Crush	28 June 2019
21	Double dip with me all day long	5 July 2019
22	Push the button	12 July 2019
23	Did you hear about the Crab Girl?	19 July 2019
24	Viennetta Vinny	26 July 2019
25	Twinkle Toes	2 August 2019
26	Out of Office #2	9 August 2019
27	Found a good a chew	16 August 2019
28	Oops!	23 August 2019
29	Use your face more!	30 August 2019
30	Swamp rings	6 September 2019
31	Sugar Lips	13 September 2019
32	Butt Rings	20 September 2019
33	Popcast	27 September 2019
34	Coughcast	4 October 2019
35	Bit of the moon	11 October 2019
36	Final Warning	18 October 2019
37	The Urine Episode	25 October 2019
38	Buttery Beef	1 November 2019
39	The Zodiac DJ	8 November 2019
40	Cheese table	15 November 2019
41	Batman lives next door	22 November 2019
42	Don't hate, hydrate.	29 November 2019
43	Raging semi	6 December 2019
44	Bad breath boyfriend	13 December 2019
45	Sweaty Veg: Christmas Special	20 December 2019
46	Wide Winifred	10 January 2020
47	Express yourself	17 January 2020
48	Drip Drip Drop.	24 January 2020
49	Brace yourself	31 January 2020
50	Billy's Egg Trick	7 February 2020
51	Sip Swallow Chug, Chug, Chug	14 February 2020
52	One in Thirty	21 February 2020
53	Auntie Panky	28 February 2020
54	Pointing the Finger	6 March 2020
55	Elastic Burdens	13 March 2020
56	The Depositor	20 March 2020
57	The Sniff test	27 March 2020
58	Fondling by the reservoir	3 April 2020
59	Tiger trap	10 April 2020
60	Zoom Pole	17 April 2020
61	My lover	24 April 2020
62	Yarden	1 May 2020
63	The Twits	8 May 2020
64	Bath Buddy	15 May 2020
65	Love Birds	22 May 2020
66	Fortune cookies	29 May 2020
67	Streets of Heferlon	5 June 2020
68	Dental dam	12 June 2020
69	Meal for Two	19 June 2020
70	Seventy several	26 June 2020
71	Dull as dishwater	3 July 2020
72	Guest in the nest	10 July 2020
73	36 hours later	17 July 2020
74	Queen Bee in The Side Garden	24 July 2020
75	A breath of fresh air	31 July 2020
76	Sweet sixteen unicorn	7 August 2020
77	Eat Your Words	14 August 2020
78	Magnety	21 August 2020
79	Around the World	28 August 2020
80	Auntie Pat	4 September 2020
81	Spite Salmon	11 September 2020
82	Minty Fresh	18 September 2020
83	Give me an A	25 September 2020
84	Top Sheet	2 October 2020
85	Mark of Zorro	9 October 2020
86	The today after tomorrow	16 October 2020
87	Heels and shoulders	23 October 2020
88	Mr Saturday Night	30 October 2020
89	Where you bin my love?	6 November 2020
90	Bed Kegs	13 November 2020
91	See this finger, see this thumb	20 November 2020
92	Narrow Church	27 November 2020
93	Living with Meatloaf	4 December 2020
94	Gorgey Hun	11 December 2020
95	Turkey leg-over	18 December 2020
96	Christmas Bonus Special	25 December 2020
97	Docket or Not	1 January 2021
98	Maternity Leave #1	8 January 2021
99	Maternity Leave #2	15 January 2021
100	Best of #1	22 January 2021
101	Maternity Leave #3	29 January 2021
102	Cremetisserie	5 February 2021
103	Bones	12 February 2021
104	Flock of Lasagne	19 February 2021
105	Coffin Confessors	26 February 2021
106	Pay as you go go go	5 March 2021
107	Bucking Mad	12 March 2021
108	Carpet Squares	19 March 2021
109	Flannel Heavy	26 March 2021
110	110 take 2	2 April 2021
111	Total (lack of) Recall	9 April 2021
112	Coal-Slaw	16 April 2021
113	How deep do you sleep?	23 April 2021
114	A lady from the 90's	30 April 2021
115	Sidebored	7 May 2021
116	Instructed by tumblers	14 May 2021
117	Festering Bowl of Bolognese	21 May 2021
118	What a man wants	28 May 2021
119	Like father, like son	4 June 2021
120	Low hanging fruit	11 June 2021
121	One ring to rule them all	18 June 2021
122	Hack Guy	25 June 2021
123	Case closed	2 July 2021
124	The Midwife Always Knocks Twice	9 July 2021
125	Return of the toenails	16 July 2021
126	Good Grief	23 July 2021
127	Not a holiday	30 July 2021
128	Draw the minion!	6 August 2021
129	Rosie Harissa	13 August 2021
130	To whom it may concern	20 August 2021
131	A thumbnail of wine	27 August 2021
132	Fish Guy	3 September 2021
133	The Iron Curtain	10 September 2021
134	Bon bons in the knicker drawer	17 September 2021
135	Turbo time	24 September 2021
136	Elephant Dolphin	1 October 2021
137	Oh Crumbs	8 October 2021
138	Party at the drive thru	15 October 2021
139	Baby name betrayal	22 October 2021
140	NOT a Halloween Special	29 October 2021
141	That's a crow	5 November 2021
142	Classic Borisina	12 November 2021
143	How's Christine?	19 November 2021
144	Licence to snooze	26 November 2021
145	Sorry Dad	3 December 2021
146	Liquid Gold	10 December 2021
147	Find a happy place	17 December 2021
148	Christmas Special	24 December 2021
149	Dipped in fat	7 January 2022
150	Tony doesn't live here	14 January 2022
151	Timber	21 January 2022
152	Do Buy	28 January 2022
153	Record Breakers	4 February 2022
154	Stain of regret	11 February 2022
155	The Pitt's	18 February 2022
156	Bathroom Teaspoon	26 February 2022
157	Purple reigns	4 March 2022
158	These boots aren't made for walking	11 March 2022
159	Free Roam	18 March 2022
160	Round Robin	25 March 2022
161	How long you staying?	1 April 2022
162	Three words	8 April 2022
163	Good Friday plonkcast	15 April 2022
164	The Best Walker	22 April 2022
165	Rude Awakening	29 April 2022
166	Hip hip...	6 May 2022
167	Killer extensions	13 May 2022
168	The Worst Smell in The World	20 May 2022
169	Dacious	27 May 2022
170	The 80's door handle	3 June 2022
171	Meet you in my dreams	10 June 2022
172	But what about the pool table?	17 June 2022
173	Hot Potato	24 June 2022
174	Co-ords	1 July 2022
175	Double Muggins	8 July 2022
176	Out of Office	15 July 2022
177	Summer holiday special	22 July 2022
178	Oh wow	29 July 2022
179	Pokethon	5 August 2022
180	Sommelier summer camp	12 August 2022
181	The glove	19 August 2022
182	A little bit sexy	26 August 2022
183	Water is blue	2 September 2022
184	Beat the Letter	9 September 2022
185	Anchor pants	16 September 2022
186	Kegs full of Kaka	23 September 2022
187	Born to Fight	30 September 2022
188	Mars Cha Cha	7 October 2022
189	House Shoes	14 October 2022
190	Just be chill	21 October 2022
191	Gilet Incorporated	28 October 2022
192	Dirty knit witted yellow livered	4 November 2022
193	BeanFest	11 November 2022
194	Preekend	18 November 2022
195	Glib, Glab, Glob	25 November 2022
196	Centrifugal Force	2 December 2022
197	Magnum XL	9 December 2022
198	Strip Search	16 December 2022
199	Christmas Special: What would Jackie do?	23 December 2022
200	AD/BC	13 January 2023
201	Don't tug at your girdle	20 January 2023
202	Ding dong the crust is gone	27 January 2023
203	Nurse Damp	3 February 2023
204	Three Blind Wipes	10 February 2023
205	Pass the Shoe	17 February 2023
206	What film am I thinking of?	24 February 2023
207	Ham Dumpling	3 March 2023
208	Cowboy	10 March 2023
209	Biggest Loser	17 March 2023
210	Pear of Anguish	24 March 2023
211	FAGDA	31 March 2023
212	Five Fold Sunnies	07 April 2023
213	Skip Cap	14 April 2023
214	Spirito Di Punto	21 April 2023
215	Cold Hearted Father	28 April 2023
216	Open!	05 May 2023
217	Kiss My Flower	12 May 2023
218	Pity Click	19 May 2023
219	Nice Coat Lee	26 May 2023
220	Good Optics	02 June 2023
221	Lego Destruction Pending	09 June 2023
222	Double Cap	16 June 2023
223	Hot Heat	23 June 2023
224	Double Wipe	30 June 2023
225	Yolo	07 June 2023
226	Whiskers	14 June 2023
227	Double Bunny Ears	21 June 2023
228	Roll In The Woods	28 June 2023
229	No Capping	04 August 2023
230	Daytime MILF Event	11 August 2023
231	Obligatory Trebles	18 August 2023
232	Four Eighths	25 August 2023
233	4pm Fight Time	01 September 2023
234	Triple D	08 September 2023
235	Egg, Toast, Wine and...	15 September 2023
236	Rosie and Ramsey FM	22 September 2023
237	Dinner Ladies Best Mate	29 September 2023
238	Open Seasame	06 October 2023
239	Talk Less, Smile More	13 October 2023
240	Duvet Lasagne	20 October 2023
241	Air Biscuit	27 October 2023
242	Beloved Sponge	03 November 2023
243	Bag of Bricks	10 November 2023
244	QFTP Special	17 November 2023
245	Serial Sanitiser	24 November 2023
246	A New Low	01 December 2023
247	Incense Sisters	08 December 2023
248	Breaded Ham	15 December 2023
249	Christmas Ramsey	22 December 2023
250	Soft Man Era	05 January 2024
251	Better Than You	12 January 2024
252	Taste the Rainbow	19 January 2024
253	This Young Perp	26 January 2024
254	Your Ma	02 Feb 2024
255	Purple Power Ranger	09 February 2024
256	The Greatest Showman	16 February 2024
257	Gary's Anatomy	23 February 2024
258	In The Namy	01 March 2024
259	The Constant Gardner	08 March 2024
260	Dog In	15 March 2024
261	Protein Chowder	22 March 2024
262	Can We Talk About Bruno?	29 March 2024
263	There's No Place Like Home	05 April 2024
264	Freaky and Weird	12 April 2024
265	Blah de blah	19 April 2024
266	Gasolina	26 April 2024
267	Rumour Has It	03 May 2024
268	Eat an egg!	10 May 2024
269	The Summer of Sixty Nine	17 May 2024
270	Front Street Meet	24 May 2024
271	Fox Blocked	31 May 2024
272	Disposable Kegs	07 June 2024
273	Documenting my t*ts off!	14 June 2024
274	Get Your Head Stuck In	21 June 2024
275	Robaldo	28 June 2024
276	Pie Fister	05 July 2024
277	Old Prospector Ramsey	12 July 2024
278	Out of Office Reply	19 July 2024
279	All My Fellas	26 July 2024
280	Industrial Slime Production	02 August 2024
281	The Ninth Hour	09 August 2024
282	Would Rosie Eat	16 August 2024
283	Pedalo and a box of wine	23 August 2024
284	Christember	30 August 2024
285	Little Pooh	06 September 2024
286	Counted and Verified	13 September 2024
287	Takeaway Tally	20 September 2024
288	Rake Away	27 September 2024
289	Mr Pointless	04 October 2024
290	Sounds Like Churros	11 October 2024
291	C'est Super	18 October 2024
292	Pea and Hamished	25 October 2024
293	Blackhead Bullets	01 November 2024
294	Itchy Eyes	08 November 2024
295	Allegedly	15 November 2024
296	Phants!	22 November 2024
297	This is horrifying	29 November 2024
298	Salavicious	06 December 2024
299	Boil and Bite	13 December 2024
300	The 300th Episode	20 December 2024
301	Warhammer Guy	10 January 2025
302	Ask Your Mam	17 January 2025
303	Louse House	24 January 2025
304	Vasectomy Guy	31 January 2025
305	Blue Belt	07 February 2025
306	Pity Party	14 february 2025
307	Four baths a day	21 February 2025
308	Non-mover	28 February 2025
309	Rosie Roulette	07 March 2025
310	Spar Mob	14 March 2025
311	Star Baker	21 March 2025
312	Auxiliary Chicken Nuggets	28 March 2025
313	Voila!	04 April 2025
314	What's All This?	11 April 2025
315	Stop! Pollen Time	18 April 2025
316	Hide and Seek	25 April 2025
317	Beer Pump Guy	02 May 2025
318	Live Forever	09 May 2025
319	Book Awards, Taskmaster and Kids in the Pub	16 May 2025
320	Welephant and the traumatic Chip Pan	23 May 2025
321	Pick Up Four	30 May 2025
322	Shandy Alarm	06 June 2025
323	In a Villa!	13 June 2025
324	Barbecue of Lies	20 June 2025
325	Ten percent more love	27 June 2025
326	Weddings, Proms and Trouser Skirts	04 July 2025
327	Too rude for YouTube?!	11 July 2025
328	Crying in the shower, flight etiquette and the worst lie-in ever	18 July 2025
329	Giant Inflatable Doughnut	25 July 2025
330	Wet Mammals	01 August 2025
