= Will Tudor =

English actor (born 1987)

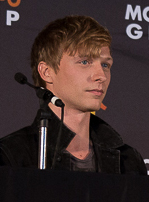
- Tudor in October 2015
- Born: William James Sibree Tudor; 11 April 1987 (age 38); London, England
- Education: Shrewsbury School; Central School of Speech and Drama; University of London; University of Leicester
- Occupation: Actor
- Years active: 2011–present

William James Sibree Tudor (born 11 April 1987) is an English actor, known for his role as Olyvar in the HBO series Game of Thrones from 2013 to 2015. He has also appeared in the miniseries The Red Tent, and the Channel 4 series Humans. From 2017 to 2018, he portrayed Sebastian Verlac / Jonathan Morgenstern on the Freeform series Shadowhunters.

== Filmography ==
Film roles
Year	Title	Role	Notes
2014	Vampire Academy	Senior Novice	Uncredited role
2014	Bonobo	Toby	
2018	Where Hands Touch	Junior SS	
2018	Tomorrow	Tristan	

Television roles
Year	Title	Role	Notes
2011	Great Expectations	Estella's Admirer	Miniseries; Episode 2
2013	Doctors	Young Sam Reid	Series 15; Episode 9: "Turn Back Time"
2013–2015	Game of Thrones	Olyvar	Recurring role; Seasons 3–5; 7 episodes
2014	In the Club	Jack Moorhouse	Series 1; 4 episodes
2014	The Red Tent	Joseph	Miniseries; Parts 1 & 2
2015–2018	Humans	Odi / 'V'	Main role; Series 1–3; 14 episodes
2016	Mr Selfridge	Frank Whiteley	Series 4; 4 episodes
2017–2018	Shadowhunters	Sebastian Verlac / Jonathan Morgenstern	Recurring role; Seasons 2 & 3; 11 episodes
2018	Lore	Levi Hollister	Season 2; Episode 5: "Mary Webster: The Witch of Hadley"
2018	Torvill & Dean	Christopher Dean	Television film
2020	Industry	Theo Tuck	Main role; Series 1; 7 episodes
2022	The Ipcress File	Mark	Miniseries; Episodes 1–6
2023	The Wheel of Time	Barthanes Damodred	Season 2; Episodes 5–7
2024	Moonflower Murders	Aiden MacNeil / Algernon Marsh	Episodes 1–6
2024	Wolf Hall: The Mirror and the Light	Edward Seymour	Miniseries; 4 episodes
