= Bobby Mair =

Canadian stand-up comedian

- Occupation: Comedian
- Spouse: Harriet Kemsley (m. 2017; div. 2024)
- Children: 1

Bobby Mair is a Canadian stand-up comedian based in London, England. Mair has appeared on The Hour, Russell Howard's Good News, Sweat the Small Stuff, Virtually Famous, Never Mind the Buzzcocks, Sam Delaney's News Thing, 8 Out of 10 Cats and Live at The Rivermill. Mair won the Laughing Horse New Act Of The Year competition in 2012. He has supported Jerry Sadowitz, Doug Stanhope and Bill Burr.

He was also the host of the reality horror show Killer Camp on ITV2, and starred in the reality sitcom Bobby and Harriet Get Married on Vice.

== Personal life ==
Mair was born in Canada. He is adopted and has two half-siblings. He was married to comedian Harriet Kemsley. The build-up to the wedding was documented on the Viceland show Bobby and Harriet Get Married. They have one daughter, born in 2021. Kemsley used a stand-up set broadcast on 19 April 2024 as part of the last episode of The Now Show to announce that she had recently been divorced from Mair.

He is a second cousin once removed of Canadian pop star Justin Bieber; however, he says that they have never met - a fact mentioned many times, including in his Edinburgh Fringe show Obviously Adopted.

Mair cited his traumatic childhood on the You'll Do podcast. He has been diagnosed with borderline personality disorder saying "It's a disease that has been in the public eye for years but never gets as much attention as bipolar or schizophrenia." Mair suffered from alcohol and drug addiction.
