= Joanna Benecke =

British-Swedish screenwriter and actress

Joanna Benecke is a British-Swedish screenwriter and actress. She is best known for co-writing the 2014 British comedy-drama film Bonobo.

She was born in the United Kingdom and grew up in Sweden where she acted in the Swedish television series Olivia Twist and En klass för sig, and was the voice of Jerry's Mom in the animated series The Three Friends and Jerry.

After achieving a BA in English at St Catharine's College, Cambridge, Benecke continued to work as an actress, appearing in Joe Swanberg’s 2008 short film, Swedish Blueballs.

She received an MA in creative writing from Royal Holloway, University of London, in 2012. In 2015 Benecke was an Outfest Screenwriting Fellow, and in 2016 she was a semi-finalist in the academy's Nicholl Fellowships in Screenwriting with her screenplay Be Normal.

== Work ==
Jacquotte Delahaye's story is the lead subject of Back from The Dead Red, a small independently produced animated film written by Joanna Benecke.
