= Jason Manford =

English comedian and singer (born 1981)

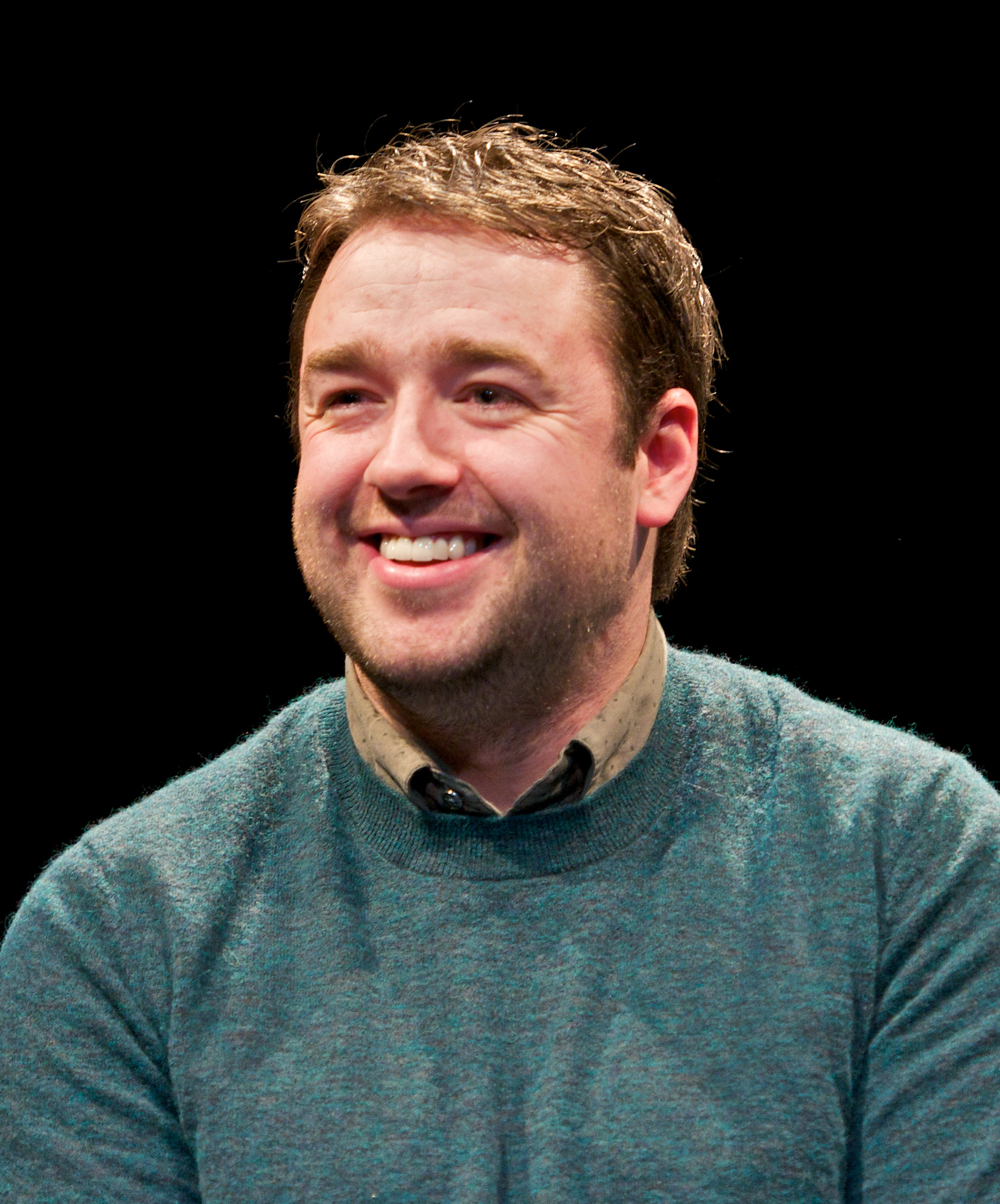
- Manford in January 2013
- Born: Jason John Manford; 26 May 1981 (age 45); Salford, England
- Education: University of Salford (BA)
- Occupations: Comedian; presenter; actor; singer
- Years active: 1999–present
- Spouses: Catherine Manford (m. 2007; div. 2013) Lucy Dyke (m. 2017)
- Children: 6
- Website: jasonmanford.com

Jason John Manford (born 26 May 1981) is an English comedian, singer, presenter and actor.

Manford was a team captain on the Channel 4 panel show 8 Out of 10 Cats from 2007 until 2010 and has presented television shows for the BBC and ITV including Comedy Rocks (2010–2011), The One Show (2010), Show Me the Funny (2011), A Question of Sport: Super Saturday (2014), Bigheads (2017) and Children in Need (2022), and was one of four judges on ITV's Starstruck (2022).

Manford has starred in stage musicals in the West End and across the UK such as Sweeney Todd, The Producers, Chitty Chitty Bang Bang, Guys and Dolls, Curtains and The Wizard of Oz. In 2026, he starred as one of the leading roles in the UK premiere of Broadway Musical ‘’Something Rotten!’’, during its opening run in Manchester.

== Early life ==
Jason John Manford was born on 26 May 1981 in Salford, the son of Sharon (née Ryan) and courtroom stenographer and trade union shop steward in the NHS Ian Manford. His maternal grandmother, Nora (née Peate), was an Irish Catholic from Dublin. Manford and his four siblings grew up in a terraced house in the Whalley Range area of Manchester. He attended St Margaret's Primary School in Whalley Range, and later Chorlton High School (at the time known as Oakwood High School). He formed a band in school with two friends, Simon and Neil, with his mother later saying this was what got him into singing.

During a Twitter exchange in which Manford defended strike action by British railway workers in the ASLEF trade union, he recalled his various workplaces before his comedy career, including building sites, call centres, shops, bars, warehouses and offices. He stated: "I didn't just leave school and say 'right, I'm off to play the arena!'". While working as a glass-collector at a local pub, Manford became interested in comedy after watching the likes of Eddie Izzard, Peter Kay and Johnny Vegas perform at the local comedy club. Kay recommended him to undertake an HND in media and performance at the University of Salford, which Kay himself had. Despite not having the required A-level grades, he was accepted into the programme and eventually upgraded to a full degree. His brother Colin, also a University of Salford graduate, followed him into performing and is also a stand-up comedian.

== Career ==
=== Television ===
From June to November 2007, Manford had a small part in Ideal as Jack. He later made another appearance in episode five of the series. He hosted a breakfast show on XFM Manchester until May 2008.

From June to November 2007, Manford was Paramount Comedy's continuity announcer and writer. In June 2007, he took over from Dave Spikey as a team captain on 8 Out of 10 Cats.

On 26 May 2010, Manford was announced as the new presenter of BBC One's The One Show from July 2010. He resigned from the programme in November 2010 following allegations surrounding his private life.

Since 21 June 2014, Manford has hosted a BBC One show called A Question of Sport: Super Saturday, a spin-off from BBC panel show A Question of Sport. On 21 September 2014, Manford guest hosted an episode of Sunday Night at the Palladium.

Manford played the role of Marty in the 2015 BBC Drama Ordinary Lies. In 2015, he hosted The Money Pit for Dave and It's a Funny Old Week for ITV.

Since 2017, he has been the voice of Daisy's dad in a CHF Entertainment cartoon called Daisy & Ollie. He also writes some of the episodes for it.

In 2018, he fronted What Would Your Kid Do?, a new series for ITV.

In 2020, Manford came in second place as the Hedgehog on The Masked Singer. Manford hosted The Royal Variety Performance 2020 from the Blackpool Opera House, with performances including Gary Barlow, Melanie C, Steps and Britain's Got Talent 2020 winner Jon Courtenay.

In May 2021, Manford became the presenter of BBC quiz show Unbeatable. In August 2024, Manford became the presenter of another BBC quiz show The Answer Run.

In February 2024, it was confirmed that Manford had joined the cast of BBC's Waterloo Road as the school's new headteacher, Steve Savage.

=== Stand–up ===
Following a successful first UK tour and high sales of the following DVD, filmed live at the Manchester Apollo, he began his "Turning into My Dad" tour on 14 July 2010.

He toured the UK with "First-World Problems" from June to December 2013 and produced a DVD of the same name. His show "Muddle Class" was toured across the UK until the end of 2018. His tour "Like Me" began in early September 2020 and finished in October 2021.

In 2011 Manford became one of the shareholders of the Chester comedy club The Laugh Inn. He frequented the club to see shows and support the circuit comedians, as well as performing impromptu shows. The club closed in 2013.

=== Singing ===
Manford comes from a family of singers and musicians and sang regularly with them. In the TV competition Born to Shine in 2011, he was taught daily to sing in an operatic style; he went on to win the show, and has released an album of show tunes, titled A Different Stage.

On 25 November 2022, Manford released the single "Assembly Bangers", a song he had been closing his standup show with. The track is a medley of songs nostalgically associated with school assemblies including "This Little Light of Mine", "He's Got the Whole World in His Hands" and "Lord of the Dance". Profits were donated to Trussell Trust's Emergency Fund Appeal. The single charted at number two on the UK Official Singles Sales Chart on 2 December 2022.

On 16 December 2022, Manford released Assembly Bangers: The Album with Chris Sutherland, with the "Christmas Assembly Bangers" single being released on the same day. Proceeds were donated to the Trussell Trust.

=== Theatre ===
Manford made his musical theatre debut appearing for a short run as Adolfo Pirelli in the 2012 West End revival of Sweeney Todd: The Demon Barber of Fleet Street opposite Michael Ball and Imelda Staunton at the Adelphi Theatre.

In 2015, he starred as Leo Bloom in Mel Brooks' The Producers on a UK tour alongside Cory English, Phill Jupitus, Ross Noble, Louie Spence and David Bedella. The following year in 2016 to 2017 he played Caractacus Potts (sharing the role with Lee Mead) in the UK tour of Chitty Chitty Bang Bang opposite Phill Jupitus, Andy Hockley, Michelle Collins, Martin Kemp and Carrie Hope Fletcher.

In 2018, Manford appeared as Nathan Detroit in a staged concert of Guys and Dolls at the Royal Albert Hall with Adrian Lester, Stephen Mangan, Joe Stilgoe and Clive Rowe.

In 2019, he starred in Curtains, a musical whodunnit by Fred Ebb and John Kander, which toured the UK. It moved to the Wyndham's Theatre in London's West End mid-December until mid-January 2020, after which it began a further UK tour.

Manford appeared as the Cowardly Lion in The Wizard of Oz from June to September 2023 at the London Palladium opposite Ashley Banjo, Dianne Pilkington, Christina Bianco and Gary Wilmot. He reprised the role the following year when the UK tour visited the Palace Theatre, Manchester.

In 2024, Manford appeared as Nick Bottom in a concert version of the Broadway musical Something Rotten! at Theatre Royal, Drury Lane opposite Marisha Wallace, Gary Wilmot, Richard Fleeshman and Evelyn Hoskins. He will reprise the role in July 2026 at the Manchester Opera House in its full-staged UK premiere.

Since 2022, Manford has starred in the Christmas pantomimes at the Manchester Opera House including Peter Pan, Jack and the Beanstalk, Cinderella and in 2025 will appear in Robin Hood.

In 2025, Manford announced he is currently writing a new musical with Gary Barlow and Joe Stilgoe about Captain Hook (the antagonist of Peter Pan) as a "Wicked-style" origin story.

=== Video Games ===
Manford has a minor voice role in the Xbox 360 video game Fable III, playing Jammy, who teaches the player how to use mortars.

== Influences ==
Manford has cited Billy Connolly as his comedy hero, after seeing him when he was 11; further, comics such as Tommy Cooper and Peter Kay heavily influenced his comic style.

== Charity ==
In November 2008, Manford became patron of Savebabies, a charity campaigning for newborn screening.

In April 2014, Manford became a supporter of the cancer charity Stephen's Story, set up by Stephen Sutton MBE, a 19-year-old blogger with terminal colorectal cancer who set up the initiative to help others suffering from cancer. All profits made by Manford's comedy clubs during May 2014, the month of Sutton's death, were given to the charity.

== Personal life ==
Manford married his first wife, Catherine, in October 2007. They had four children together: twin daughters born on 20 August 2009, a third daughter born in December 2010, and a son born in 2012. The family lived in Bramhall.

He married his second wife, Lucy, in 2017, with whom he has two children.

Manford is a supporter of Manchester City FC.

== Discography ==
=== Studio albums ===
Title	Details	Peak chart positions
Title	Details	UK
A Different Stage	Released: 6 October 2017; Label: Decca Records; Formats: CD, digital download	10
Assembly Bangers: The Album (with Chris Sutherland)	Released: 16 December 2022; Label: Westway Music; Formats: Digital download, streaming	—

=== Singles ===
==== As lead artist ====
Title	Year	Peak chart positions
Title	Year	UK Sales
"Assembly Bangers"	2022	2
"Christmas Assembly Bangers" (with Chris Sutherland)	2022	—

==== As featured artist ====
Title	Year	Peak chart positions
Title	Year	UK
"Bring Me Sunshine" Michael Ball & Alfie Boe with the Rays of Sunshine Children's Choir & Friends	2017	—

== Performances and works ==
=== Television ===
Year	Title	Role	Channel	Notes
2000	The Best Manchester Comedy			
2000	BBC New Comedy Awards			
2002	Gloves Off			
2002	Interference			
2005	Cutting It	Comic	BBC One	
2005	Gideon's Daughter	Comic	BBC One	
2005	Ideal	Jack	BBC Three	
2005–2006	Richard & Judy		Channel 4	
2006	100 Greatest Funny Moments			
2006	Modern Worries			
2007	Shuffle			
2007	Premier League All Stars Extra Time	Presenter	Sky1	
2007	Shameless	Security guard	Channel 4	
2007–2010	8 Out of 10 Cats	Team captain	Channel 4	6 series
2007–2014	Live at the Apollo	Featured comic/presenter	BBC One	5 episodes
2008	Tonightly	Presenter	Channel 4	1 series
2009	As Seen on TV	Team captain	BBC One	1 series
2009–2010	Walk on the Wild Side	Various characters	BBC One	
2010	The One Show	Co-presenter	BBC One	With Alex Jones
2010–2011	Comedy Rocks with Jason Manford	Presenter	ITV	1 series
2010–2011	Odd One In	Team captain	ITV	2 series
2010–2011	The Comedy Annual	Featured comic	ITV	2 episodes
2011	Born to Shine	Contestant	ITV	Series winner
2011	Show Me the Funny	Presenter	ITV	1 series
2012–2014	A Funny Old Year	Presenter	ITV	
2012–	QI	Regular panellist	BBC Two	
2014	A Question of Sport: Super Saturday	Presenter	BBC One	1 series
	Tommy Cooper: Not Like That, Like This	Ken Brooke	ITV	One-off TV film
2014, 2015	Sunday Night at the Palladium	Presenter	ITV	2 episodes
2015	Ordinary Lies	Marty	BBC One	1 series
2015	Money Pit	Presenter	Dave	
2015	It's a Funny Old Week	Presenter	ITV	1 series
2016, 2024	Have I Got News for You	Guest panellist, guest host	BBC One	2 episodes
2017	The Nightly Show	Guest presenter	ITV	5 episodes
2017	The Biggest Night in British Theatre – The Olivier Awards	Presenter	ITV	
2017	Bigheads	Presenter	ITV	1 series
2017	Benidorm	Andre	ITV	1 episode
2017	Twirlywoos	Tennis player	CBeebies	1 episode
2017–present	Daisy & Ollie	Daisy's Daddy	Channel 5	Voice role 104 episodes (4 series)
2018	What Would Your Kid Do?	Presenter	ITV	2 series (12 episodes)
2019	Scarborough	Mike	BBC One	1 series
2020	First & Last	Presenter	BBC One	1 series (6 episodes)
2020–2022	The Masked Singer	Hedgehog (contestant)	ITV	1 series (6 episodes)
2021–2022	Murder, They Hope	Freddie	Gold	Series 1 Episode 3: "Dales of the Unexpected" and Series 2 Episode 2: "A Midsummer Night's Scream
2021–2023	Unbeatable	Host	BBC One	Quiz show (95 episodes)
2021	Death in Paradise	Craig Mackenzie	BBC One	Series 10 Episode 3
2021	The Wheel	Himself/celebrity expert	BBC One	Christmas special
2021	8 Out of 10 Cats Does Countdown: Christmas Special 2021	Himself/contestant	Channel 4	Christmas special
2022	Jason Manford's Funniest Ever TV Adverts	Himself/presenter	Channel 5	TV series (a.k.a. World's Funniest TV Ads with Jason Manford)
2022	Big Night of Musicals by the National Lottery	Himself/presenter	BBC One	TV special
2022	Starstruck	Judge	ITV	2 series
2022	The Olivier Awards 2022	Host	ITV	
2022	The National Lottery's Big Jubilee Street Party	Co-host	ITV	With Fleur East
2022	Children in Need	Co-presenter	BBC One	With Ade Adepitan, Mel Giedroyc, Chris Ramsey & Alex Scott
2022	Freddie & Jason: Two Men in a Tent	Himself	ITV	With Freddie Flintoff
2022	Britain Get Singing	Judge	ITV	With judges Alesha Dixon, Adam Lambert and Will.i.am and host Roman Kemp
2022–	The National Lottery’s New Year's Eve Big Bash	Co-presenter	ITV	With Alesha Dixon
2023	Eurovision Calling: Jason and Chelcee’s Ultimate Guide	Co-presenter	BBC One	With Chelcee Grimes
2024–	The Answer Run	Host	BBC One	Quiz show. Third Series commissioned.
2024	Waterloo Road	Steve Savage	BBC One	8 episodes (Series 14)
2025	The Royal Variety Performance	Host	ITV	

=== Film ===
Year	Title	Role	Notes
2025	Tinsel Town	David	

=== Theatre ===
Year	Title	Role	Venue	Location
2012	Sweeney Todd: The Demon Barber of Fleet Street	Adolfo Pirelli	Adelphi Theatre	West End
2015	The Producers	Leo Bloom	UK and Ireland tour	—N/a
2016-2017	Chitty Chitty Bang Bang	Caractacus Potts	UK and Ireland tour	—N/a
2018	Guys and Dolls In Concert	Nathan Detroit	Royal Albert Hall	London
2019-2020	Curtains	Frank Cioffi	UK and Ireland tour	—N/a
2019-2020	Curtains	Frank Cioffi	Wyndham's Theatre	West End
2022-2023	Peter Pan	Captain Hook	Manchester Opera House	Manchester
2023	The Wizard of Oz	The Cowardly Lion / Zeke	London Palladium	West End
2023-2024	Jack and the Beanstalk	Jack	Manchester Opera House	Manchester
2024	The Wizard of Oz	The Cowardly Lion / Zeke	Palace Theatre, Manchester	Manchester
2024	Something Rotten! In Concert	Nick Bottom	Theatre Royal Drury Lane	West End
2024-2025	Cinderella	Prince Charming	Manchester Opera House	Manchester
2025	Inside No. 9 Stage/Fright	Guest star	Wyndham's Theatre	West End
2025-2026	Robin Hood	Robin Hood	Manchester Opera House	Manchester
2026	Something Rotten!	Nick Bottom	Manchester Opera House	Manchester

=== Stand-up DVDs ===
- Live at the Manchester Apollo (16 November 2009)
- Live 2011 (14 November 2011)
- First World Problems (10 November 2014)

Preceded by Adrian Chiles	Co-host of The One Show (Monday-Thursday); 2010	Succeeded by Matt Baker
