= Jason Cook (comedian) =

British comedian and television writer

- Born: 1973 or 1974 (age 52–53); Hebburn, Tyne and Wear, England
- Occupations: Comedian, television writer
- Years active: 2005–present

Jason Cook (born Jason Mark Cook; birth registered c. September 1973) is a British comedian and television writer.

After attending South Tyneside College in South Shields, Cook joined the merchant navy.

He started a career in stand-up comedy in 2005 when he became part of a sketch group called Soup. Then, with Lee Fenwick, he appeared in Die Clatterschenkfieternmaus. The act was styled as Germany's most pretentious and confrontational synth-pop duo.

His 2007 solo show, My Confessions, won critical acclaim at the Edinburgh Festival Fringe. Inspired by his father's stroke and recovery, it won the Best International Show category at the New Zealand International Comedy Festival. In his show the following year, titled Joy, Cook talked about his father's diagnosis with pancreatic cancer and his subsequent death.

In 2011, he created, co-wrote (with Graham Duff), and appeared in Hebburn, a sitcom based in his hometown, of the same name, in Tyne and Wear. A pilot was performed live as part of the unbroadcast Salford Sitcom Showcase at MediaCityUK in October 2011. The series was commissioned, and first broadcast on BBC Two in October 2012. A second series was broadcast in 2013.

Cook was also the face of a Jacob's advert.
