= Jingle Bell Ball =

Annual concert in the UK

- Mini-Festival concert by Capital
- Arrangers: Global and Barclaycard
- Location: Greenwich Peninsula, London, England
- Venue: The O2 Arena (2008–2019, 2021–present)
- Duration: 5 hours per night
- No. of shows: Two per year
- Attendance: 16,000 per night
- Website: https://www.capitalfm.com/events/jingle-bell-ball/

The Jingle Bell Ball is a concert held annually in December by the radio station Capital at The O2 Arena. Various notable artists have headlined the concert. A portion of ticket sales profit is donated to Global's Make Some Noise, Capital's flagship charity, formerly known as Help a Capital Child and Help a London Child. The concert series started in 2008, but the 2020 dates were skipped because of the COVID-19 pandemic.

== 2008 ==
Unlike following years, the 2008 festival was held on one night only – Wednesday, 10 December 2008. The Evening Standard rated it three stars, saying it was "too quick to be boring but too superficial to stick in the mind".

== 2009 ==
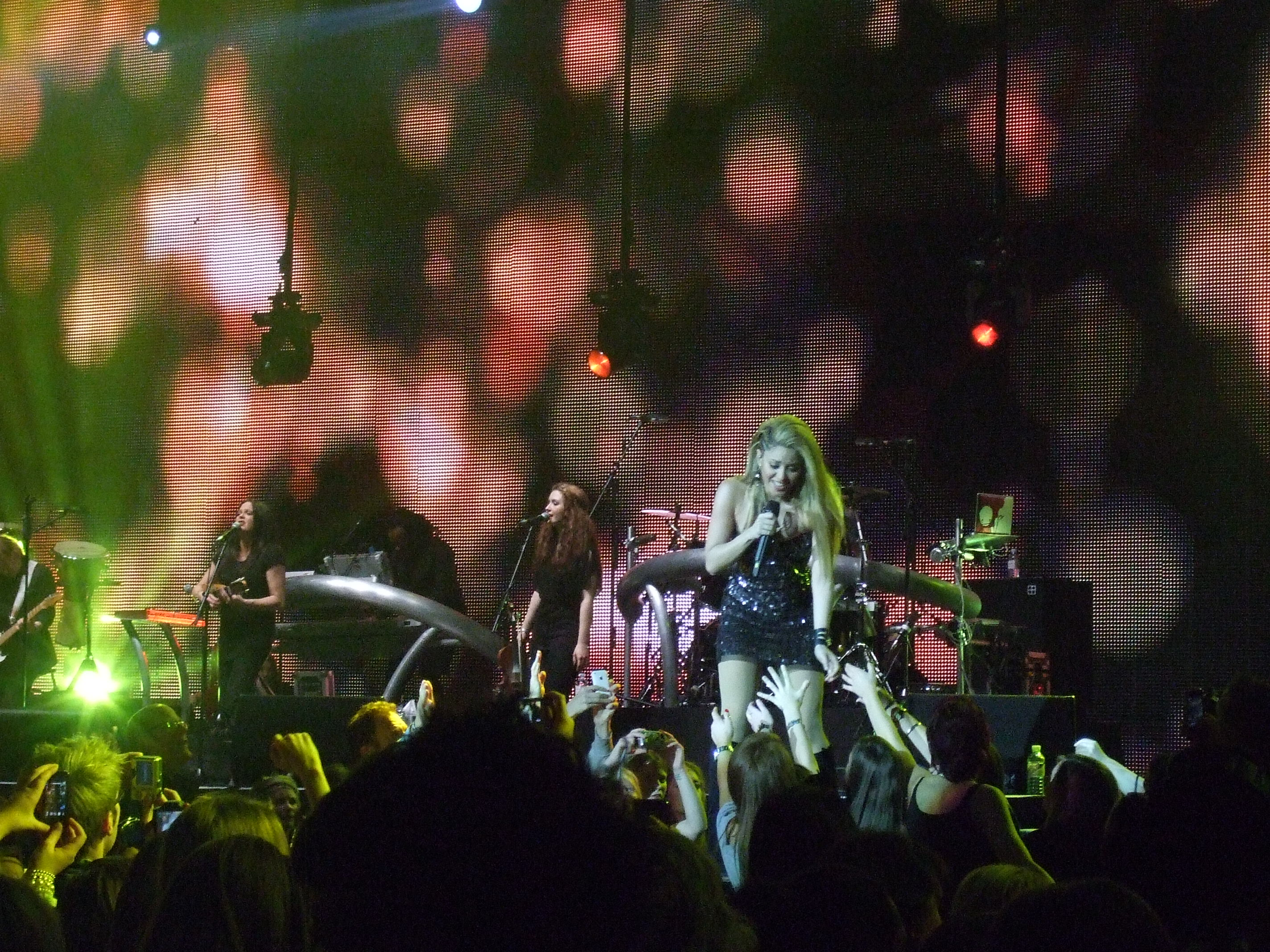
Shakira performing during Night 2 of the 2009 edition.

The 2009 event was held on 5–6 December 2009.

== 2010 ==
Capital's Jingle Bell Ball 2010 was held on 4–5 December 2010.

== 2011 ==
The 2011 event was held on 3–4 December 2011. It was announced by Capital on 28 October. Capital also confirmed that Olly Murs would be the first act for the Saturday performance. Tickets for the concert on Saturday were released on 31 October at 08:00 and sold out in just over three hours.

== 2012 ==
The 2012 event took place on 8–9 December 2012.

Little Mix performed as a three-piece, as member Perrie Edwards was unwell. Capital Breakfast presenters Dave Berry and Lisa Snowdon hosted the ball on both nights. For the first time, televised highlights of the event were shown on Capital TV.

== 2013 ==
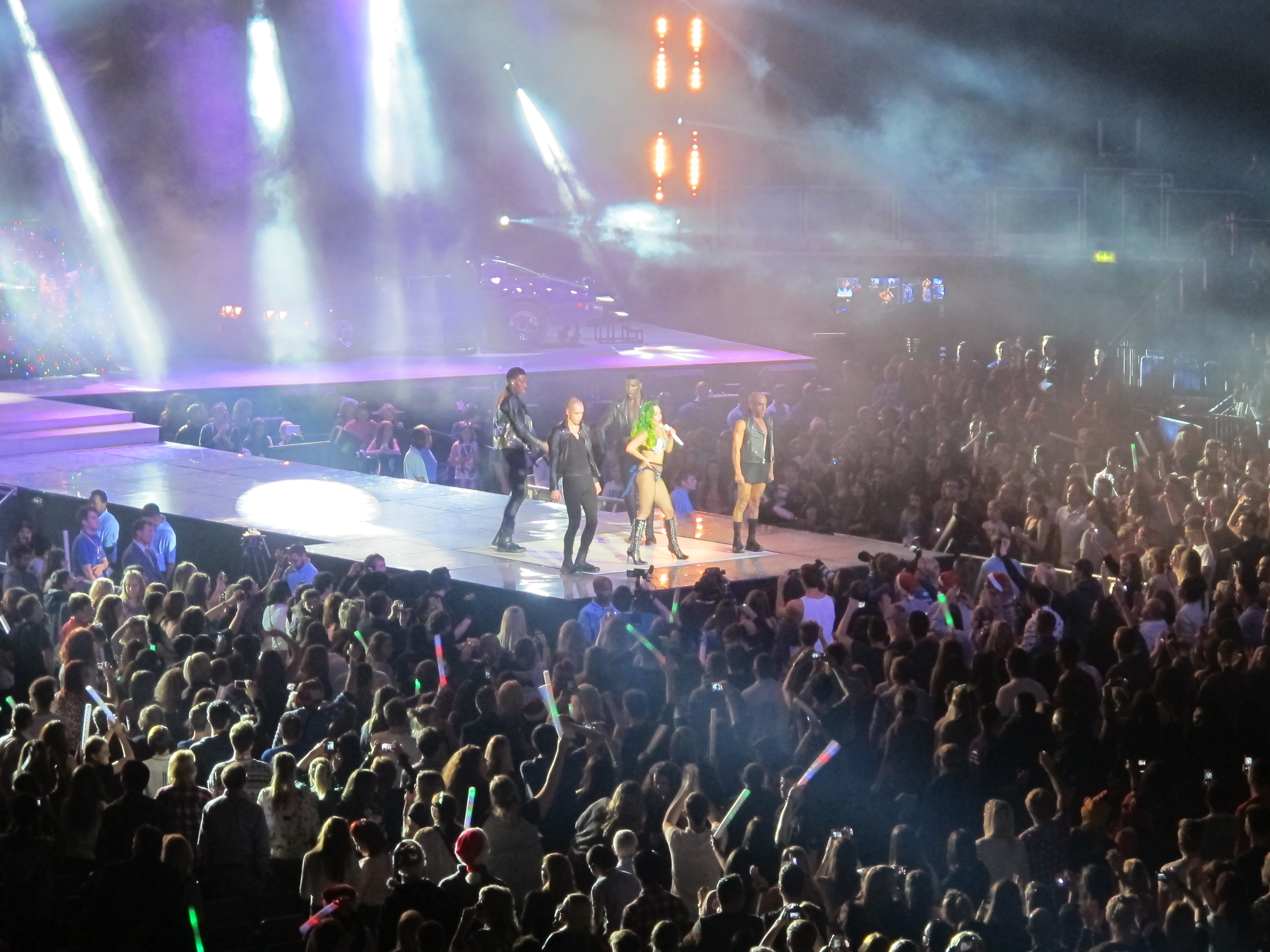
Ball headliner Lady Gaga performing on Night 2

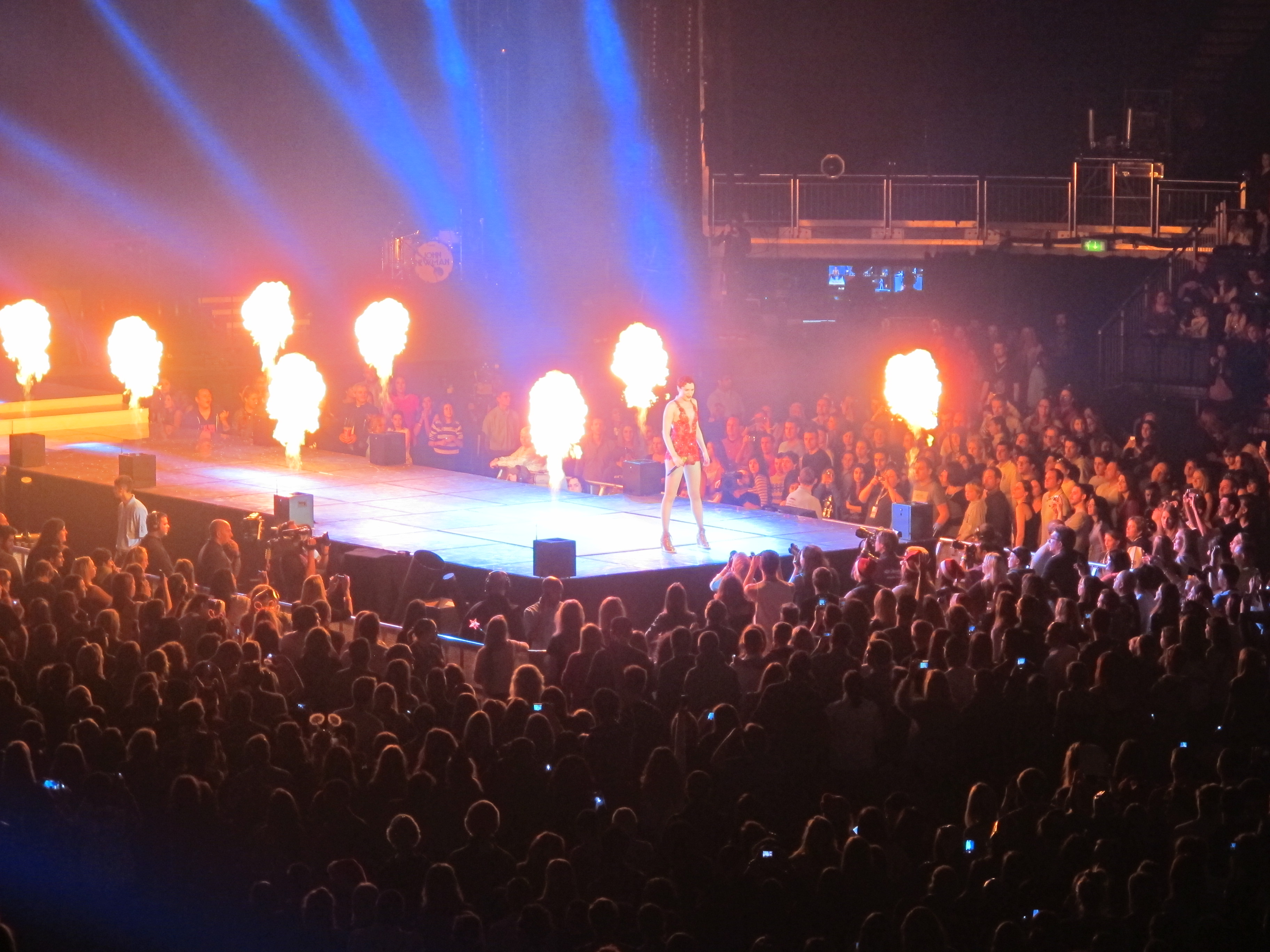
Jessie J also performing on Night 2

The 2013 Jingle Bell Ball was held at The O2 Arena on 7–8 December 2013. On Saturday night, Katy Perry was the main headliner, with Tinie Tempah and Ellie Goulding as supporting headliners. On Sunday, Lady Gaga was the main headliner, with Dizzee Rascal and Jessie J supporting.

== 2014 ==
The 2014 Jingle Bell Ball was held at London's O2 Arena on 6–7 December 2014, with OneRepublic, Ed Sheeran, Sam Smith and Jessie J performing. The first tickets for the show were given away as part of Global's first ever Make Some Noise day on 8 October, although, at the time, the dates for the event were not confirmed. It was confirmed on Capital FM on 20 October that the Jingle Bell Ball would be returning, sponsored by Morrisons supermarket. All information on the ball was announced on 3 November 2014.

5 Seconds of Summer performed at the event missing band member Michael Clifford, who was unable to fly due to the loss of his passport.

=== Line-up ===
Acts that performed on 6 December were as follows:

Main scheduled:
- Take That
- Rixton
- Olly Murs
- The Script
- Union J
- Ella Henderson
- The Vamps
- Clean Bandit & Jess Glynne

Acts that performed on 7 December were as follows:

Main scheduled:
- Taylor Swift
- Ed Sheeran
- Jessie J
- Sam Smith
- 5 Seconds of Summer
- Sigma
- Fuse ODG
- Union J
Special guests:
- Daniel Pearce
- Ella Eyre

== 2015 ==
Dave Berry and Lisa Snowdon revealed that 2015's event would once again be hosted at London's O2 Arena on 5–6 December. For the first time since 2013, the sponsor was Coca-Cola. Both headliners were announced on Friday, 6 November, on Capital Breakfast. On 23 November, Tinie Tempah and Katy B were added to the line-up, whilst Carly Rae Jepsen was added the following day. For the first time, Little Mix performed for both nights. Ariana Grande was supposed to perform on Saturday but withdrew for unknown reasons. Marvin Humes confirmed via Twitter he was doing a pre-show DJ set on both days. On 5 December, Coldplay were the headliner, and Justin Bieber was the headliner on 6 December.

== 2016 ==
The 2016 Jingle Bell Ball was held on 3–4 December 2016. The line-up was announced on 7–8 November. Tickets went on sale on 10 November at 8am and sold out in less than an hour. On 28 November, Anne-Marie, Sean Paul and Calum Scott were added to Night 1. On 29 November Sigma were added to Night 2. Capital FM confirmed via Twitter that Marvin Humes would open night one. Little Mix was announced as a headliner for the first time.

=== Line-up ===
Acts that performed on 3 December were as follows:

Main scheduled:
- Little Mix
- Calvin Harris
- Olly Murs
- Dua Lipa
- Louisa Johnson
- Nathan Sykes
- Craig David
- Sigala
- Clean Bandit
- Calum Scott
- Anne-Marie
- Sean Paul
Pre-show acts:
- Marvin Humes
Special guests:
- Imani Williams
- Bryn Christopher

Acts that performed on 4 December were as follows:

Main scheduled:
- Ellie Goulding
- Shawn Mendes
- Martin Garrix
- DNCE
- The Vamps
- Louisa Johnson
- Jonas Blue
- Years & Years
- James Arthur
- Sigma
Pre-show acts:
- Marvin Humes
Special guests:
- Dakota
- Raye
- JP Cooper
- Birdy
- Bebe Rexha

== 2017 ==
On 30 October 2017, during Capital Breakfast, it was confirmed that the Jingle Bell Ball would run on 9–10 December 2017 at The O2 Arena. On 6 November all of the regional breakfast presenters confirmed the line-up for night one and on 7 November the line-up for night two was revealed.

Major Lazer performed as a duo as Jillionaire did not turn up for unknown reasons.

Sean Paul didn't perform with Anne-Marie and Dua Lipa.

Clean Bandit didn't perform with Anne-Marie.

=== Line-up ===
Acts that performed on 9 December were as follows:

Main scheduled:
- Sam Smith
- Rita Ora
- Major Lazer
- Niall Horan
- Dua Lipa
- James Arthur
- Craig David
- Anne-Marie
- Rak-Su
- Jonas Blue
- Yungen
- Jax Jones
Pre-show acts:
- Marvin Humes
Hosts:
- Roman Kemp
- Vick Hope
Special guests:
- Kelli-Leigh
- JP Cooper
- Raye
- Dakota
- Moelogo
- Will Singe
- Dan Smith

Acts that performed on 10 December were as follows:

Main scheduled:
- Ed Sheeran
- Taylor Swift
- The Chainsmokers
- Liam Payne
- Louisa
- The Script
- Matt Terry
- Mabel
- Big Shaq
- Sigala
- Stefflon Don
- James Hype
Pre-show acts:
- Marvin Humes
Hosts:
- Roman Kemp
- Vick Hope
Special guests:
- Kelli-Leigh
- John Newman
- Ella Eyre
- Imani Williams
- Kojo Funds

== 2018 ==
The 2018 Jingle Bell Ball took place on 8–9 December 2018 at The O2 Arena.

Capital Breakfast presenters Roman Kemp, Vick Hope, and Sonny Jay hosted the event on both nights. The line up was announced by all the DJs presenting the regional versions of the Breakfast Show (Roman, Vick and Sonny doing so in London and on DAB nationwide) during the week of 5 November. For the first time since 2011, highlights of the event were not shown on Capital TV as it shut down on 10 October 2018, so highlights were only available on Capital FM and its website and Sky One. Loud Luxury was added to the night 1 line up.

=== Line-up ===
Acts that performed on 8 December were as follows:

Main scheduled:
- David Guetta
- Liam Payne
- Anne-Marie
- Halsey
- Rita Ora
- Ellie Goulding
- James Arthur
- Jonas Blue
- Olly Murs
- Rak-Su
- Loud Luxury
Pre-show acts:
- Marvin Humes
Hosts:
- Roman Kemp
- Vick Hope
- Sonny Jay
Special guests:
- Lennon Stella
- Dalton Harris
- Jack & Jack
- Becky Hill

Acts that performed on 9 December were as follows:

Main scheduled:
- Little Mix
- Sigala
- Cheryl
- Jess Glynne
- Zara Larsson
- Clean Bandit
- Jason Derulo
- Years & Years
- Mabel
- Jax Jones
Pre-show acts:
- Marvin Humes
Hosts:
- Roman Kemp
- Vick Hope
- Sonny Jay
Special guests:
- Paloma Faith
- Ella Eyre
- Marina
- Camille Purcell

== 2019 ==
The 2019 Jingle Bell Ball took place on 7–8 December 2019 at the O2 Arena in Greenwich, London. It was sponsored by SEAT.

Capital FM presenters Will Manning & Aimee Vivian hosted both nights. The line-up was announced everyday from Monday, 4 November to Thursday, 7 November 2019 on the Breakfast show live from Leicester Square in Central London. Between 4 and 5 November 2019, Jax Jones, Sigala and Ella Henderson joined Kemp, Hope and Jay to help announce the rest of the line-up for both nights. Tickets were officially sold out in just over an hour, which led to their dealing through Capital's on-air competitions. Due to Roman Kemp being confirmed as one of twelve I'm a Celebrity...Get Me Out of Here! contestants, Will Manning hosted the event alongside Aimee Vivian. Stormzy closed night 1 (Saturday 7 December 2019) and Taylor Swift closed night 2 (8 December 2019). Liam Payne opened night 1, whilst Anne-Marie opened night 2. Capital Late Show presenter Marvin Humes did a Capital Weekender DJ set. It was also confirmed that due to being in Australia, cheering on Roman Kemp, Sonny Jay missed both nights of the ball and therefore didn't present the show.

=== Line-up ===
Acts that performed on 7 December were as follows:

Main scheduled:
- Liam Payne
- Jonas Blue
- Aitch
- Young T & Bugsey
- Regard
- Ava Max
- Lauv
- Jax Jones
- Rita Ora
- Harry Styles
- Stormzy
Pre-show acts:
- Marvin Humes
Hosts:
- Will Manning
- Aimee Vivian
Special guests:
- JP Cooper
- Jay Sean
- Hrvy
- ZieZie
- Ella Henderson

Acts that performed on 8 December were as follows:

Main scheduled:
- Anne-Marie
- Sigala
- AJ Tracey
- Tom Walker
- Regard
- Mabel
- Joel Corry
- The Script
- Sam Feldt
- Sam Smith
- Taylor Swift
Pre-show acts:
- Marvin Humes
Hosts:
- Will Manning
- Aimee Vivian
Special guests:
- Ella Henderson
- Becky Hill
- Ella Eyre
- RANI
- Hayley May

== 2020 ==
Due to the COVID-19 pandemic, the Jingle Bell Ball did not take place at the O2 Arena this year, but Roman Kemp (along with Siân Welby and Sonny Jay) announced on Capital Breakfast on Thursday 26 November that they were doing a Best Of Show sponsored by Barclaycard on Thursday 10 December. The show was broadcast on YouTube, Sky One, Global Player and on Capital Radio.

== 2021 ==
The 2021 Jingle Bell Ball took place on 11–12 December 2021 at the O2 at Greenwich Peninsula, London. This year's Jingle Bell Ball was sponsored by Barclaycard. This was the first Jingle Bell Ball since 2019 due to the impact of the COVID-19 pandemic on the music industry which cancelled the 2020 Jingle Bell Ball. The Ball was announced by Rob Howard and Lauren Layfield on Friday, 29 October 2021 at roughly 8.05am during Capital Breakfast, while deputising for regular presenters Roman Kemp, Siân Welby and Sonny Jay. Roman, Siân and Sonny then returned the following Monday to confirm all of the details.

Capital Breakfast presenters Roman Kemp, Siân Welby and Sonny Jay hosted both nights. The line-up was announced on Wednesday 3 and Thursday 4 November from 8am on the Breakfast show live from Leicester Square in Central London, with reveals also taking place across the UK via interactive billboards founded by the listeners.

On Saturday, 11 December 2021, it was announced that Coldplay and Lil Nas X, who were originally scheduled to play on the first and second nights respectively, had to pull out due to members of their team getting COVID-19. It was announced ArrDee and Tom Grennan would be added to the lineup, with ArrDee performing on both nights, whilst Tom Grennan would just be doing the Saturday. It was also announced Justin Bieber and Ed Sheeran would both be extending their sets. On 12 December it was announced that Mabel would not be performing for the same reason. Grennan performed on the second night as a result of this.

=== Line-up ===
Saturday	Sunday
Justin Bieber; Tom Grennan; ArrDee; Jax Jones; Years & Years; Becky Hill; Jesy Nelson; Sigrid; Mimi Webb; Billen Ted; 220 Kid; Riton	Ed Sheeran; Joel Corry; KSI; Griff; Anne-Marie; JLS; Nathan Dawe; Shane Codd; Jonasu; ArrDee; Tom Grennan
Pulled Out Coldplay	Pulled Out Lil Nas X Mabel
Hosts Roman Kemp; Siân Welby; Sonny Jay
Special Guests bbno$ Ella Henderson; Wes Nelson	Special Guests Craig David; Digital Farm Animals; Ella Henderson

== 2022 ==
The Jingle Bell Ball was announced during Capital Breakfast on 4 November 2022 and it was announced that Barclaycard would sponsor the Ball again. The line-up for the first night was announced on 7 November 2022, while the line-up for the second night was announced on 8 November 2022. The Jingle Bell Ball was held at The O2 Arena at Greenwich Peninsula in Greater London on 10 December 2022 and 11 December 2022.

Both nights of the Jingle Bell Ball were hosted by Roman Kemp, Siân Welby, Sonny Jay and Chris Stark.

The Ball also has a new logo for this year after Capital changed its logo in November 2022.

This was the first time the Jingle Bell Ball was held during a FIFA World Cup as the 2022 FIFA World Cup was still happening during Night 1 with England playing France in the Quarter-finals at the Al Bayt Stadium in Al Khor, Qatar.

On 10 December 2022, it was announced that Tom Grennan would open Night 1 and that Coldplay would close Night 1. On 11 December 2022, it was announced that Dua Lipa would open Night 2 and that Stormzy would close Night 2.

=== Line-up ===
Saturday 10 December 2022	Sunday 11 December 2022
Coldplay; Lewis Capaldi; Sam Smith; Tom Grennan; Mimi Webb; KSI; Nathan Dawe; Sigala; LF System; Eliza Rose; Belters Only	Dua Lipa; Stormzy; Becky Hill; George Ezra; Aitch; Joel Corry; Tiësto; LF System; Eliza Rose; Belters Only
Hosts Roman Kemp; Siân Welby; Sonny Jay; Chris Stark
Special Guests Sam Ryder; Kim Petras; Talia Mar; Ella Henderson	Special Guests Tom Grennan

== 2023 ==
The 2023 Jingle Bell Ball was announced on Friday 10 November. The dates of the ball were 9 and 10 December. This was Roman Kemp's final year of hosting the Jingle Bell Ball, having confirmed his departure on Capital FM to focus on his television career at the start of the following year. The line-up for night 1 was announced on Wednesday 15 November and Thursday 16 November for night 2 was also confirmed. Barclaycard remained the sponsors for the ball. Alicia Keys and Sam Ryder performed in both nights of the ball. The 2023 Jingle Bell Ball was held at The O2 Arena at Greenwich Peninsula in Greater London.

Both nights of the Jingle Bell Ball were hosted by Roman Kemp, Siân Welby and Chris Stark.

This was MistaJam’s last Jingle Bell Ball DJ set after he announced his departure from "The Capital Weekender" on 29 June 2024.

=== Line-up ===
Saturday 9 December 2023	Sunday 10 December 2023
Alicia Keys; Busted; Tate McRae; Becky Hill; Leigh-Anne; Tom Grennan; ArrDee; Jax Jones; Nathan Dawe	Alicia Keys; Take That; Rita Ora; Zara Larsson; Jazzy; Rudimental; S Club; Raye; Joel Corry
Hosts Roman Kemp; Siân Welby; Chris Stark
Special Guests Sam Ryder	Special Guests Sam Ryder; Calum Scott

== 2024 ==
The 2024 Jingle Bell Ball was announced on Monday 4 November. The dates of the ball were 7 and 8 December. This was Jordan North's first Jingle Bell Ball after Roman Kemp's departure from the station in March 2024. The line-up for the ball was announced on 6 November for Night 1 and 7 November for Night 2 with Coldplay headlining 7 December and Katy Perry headlining 8 December.

=== Line-up ===
Saturday 7 December 2024	Sunday 8 December 2024
Coldplay; Teddy Swims; Tom Grennan; Clean Bandit; Sigala; Perrie; Ella Henderson	Katy Perry; Becky Hill; Sonny Fodera; KSI; Joel Corry; Kygo; Tom Grennan
Hosts Jordan North; Siân Welby; Chris Stark
Special Guests Craig David	Special Guests Clementine Douglas; Jazzy; Craig David; Zak Abel; Sandro Cavazza; Justin Jesso

== 2025 ==
The 2025 Jingle Bell Ball took place during 6–7 December at The O2.

=== Line-up ===
Saturday 6 December 2025	Sunday 7 December 2025
Ed Sheeran; Raye; Sonny Fodera; Leigh-Anne; Alessi Rose; Anne-Marie; Mimi Webb; Rizzle Kicks; Moliy	Kylie Minogue; Jessie J Alex Warren; Cat Burns; Tinie Tempah; MK; WizTheMc; Louis Tomlinson; Jax Jones; Rose Gray
Hosts Jordan North; Siân Welby; Chris Stark
Barclaycard Out of the Blue Surprise Act Five	Special Guests Clementine Douglas; Myles Smith

== 2026 ==
The 2026 Jingle Bell Ball will take place during 5–6 December at The O2.

Saturday 5 December 2026	Sunday 6 December 2026
Teddy Swims; Becky Hill; December 10; Ashe; Bash Croft; Lewis Capaldi; Jorja Smith; Aitch; Mulaa Joans; Tinie Tempah	John Legend; Freya Skye; Clean Bandit; Stella Lefty; Tom Grennan; Jamie Miller; D.O.D. Leona Lewis; Rudimental; Jason Derulo
Hosts Jordan North; Siân Welby; Chris Stark
Barclaycard Out of the Blue Surprise Act	Special Guests

== Most frequent performers ==
Apps.	Artist	Years appeared
8	Leigh-Anne *as a member of Little Mix	2012*, 2013*, 2015* (both nights), 2016*, 2018*, 2023, 2025
7	Jesy Nelson *as a member of Little Mix	2012*, 2013*, 2015* (both nights), 2016*, 2018*, 2021
7	Perrie *as a member of Little Mix	2012*, 2013*, 2015* (both nights), 2016*, 2018*, 2024
7	Tom Grennan	2021 (both nights), 2022 (both nights), 2023, 2024 (both nights)
6	Anne-Marie	2016, 2017, 2018, 2019, 2021, 2025
6	Little Mix	2012, 2013, 2015 (both nights), 2016, 2018
6	Olly Murs	2010, 2011, 2012, 2014, 2016, 2018
6	The Script	2008, 2010, 2012, 2014, 2017, 2019
6	Nathan Sykes *as a member of the Wanted	2010 (both nights)*, 2011*, 2012*, 2015, 2016
5	Ed Sheeran	2011, 2014, 2017, 2021, 2025
5	Jason Derulo	2010, 2011, 2013, 2015, 2018
5	Ella Eyre	2013, 2014, 2017, 2018
5	JLS	2009, 2010, 2011, 2012, 2021
5	Liam Payne *as a member of One Direction	2011*, 2012*, 2017, 2018, 2019
5	Sigala	2016, 2017, 2018, 2019, 2022
5	Sam Smith	2013, 2014, 2017, 2019, 2022
5	Jax Jones	2017, 2018, 2019, 2021, 2023
5	Years & Years	2015, 2016, 2018, 2021
5	Rita Ora	2012, 2017, 2018, 2019, 2023
5	Raye	2016, 2017, 2019, 2023, 2025
4	Rizzle Kicks	2011, 2012, 2013, 2025
4	Coldplay	2011, 2015, 2022, 2024
4	Calvin Harris	2011, 2012, 2015, 2016
4	Jessie J	2011, 2012, 2013, 2014
4	Ellie Goulding	2013, 2015, 2016, 2018
4	James Arthur	2013, 2016, 2017, 2018
4	Jonas Blue	2016, 2017, 2018, 2019
4	The Saturdays	2008, 2009, 2010, 2011
4	Tinie Tempah	2010, 2012, 2013, 2015
4	The Vamps	2013, 2014, 2015, 2016
4	The Wanted	2010 (both nights), 2011, 2012
3	Cheryl Cole *as a member of Girls Aloud	2012 (night one) and (night two)*, 2018
3	Clean Bandit	2014, 2016, 2018
3	Craig David	2008, 2016, 2017
3	Jess Glynne	2014, 2015, 2018
3	Ella Henderson	2014, 2019 (Both Nights)
3	Niall Horan *as a member of One Direction	2011*, 2012*, 2017
3	Dua Lipa	2016, 2017, 2022
3	JP Cooper	2016, 2017, 2019
3	Louisa Johnson	2016 (both nights), 2017
3	Louis Tomilnson *as a member of One Direction	2011*, 2012*, 2025
3	Mabel	2017, 2018, 2019
3	Sam Ryder	2022, 2023(both nights)
3	Sigma	2014, 2015, 2016
3	Harry Styles *as a member of One Direction	2011*, 2012*, 2019
3	Taylor Swift	2014, 2017, 2019
2	Justin Bieber	2015, 2021
2	Alexandra Burke	2009, 2010
2	Alicia Keys	2023 (both nights)
2	Taio Cruz	2009, 2010
2	Dakota	2016, 2017
2	David Guetta	2015, 2018
2	Eliza Doolittle	2010, 2013
2	Example	2010, 2012
2	Flo Rida	2009, 2010
2	Katy Perry	2013, 2024
2	Kelli-Leigh	2017 (both nights)
2	Labrinth	2010, 2011
2	Lawson	2012, 2013
2	Pixie Lott	2009, 2011
2	John Newman	2013, 2017
2	One Direction	2011, 2012
2	Rak-Su	2017, 2018
2	Scouting for Girls	2008, 2010
2	Sugababes	2008, 2009
2	Union J	2013, 2014
2	Take That	2014, 2023
2	Imani Williams	2016, 2017

== Sponsors ==
The first concert in 2008 was sponsored by Zavvi. In 2009, Windows 7 became the sponsor, in conjunction with the build-up for the operating system's launch. The sponsorship continued through 2011.

In 2012, BlackBerry sponsored the concert in a last-minute deal. In 2013 and 2015-2018, the event was sponsored by Coca-Cola. Morrisons Supermarket was the sponsor in 2014. SEAT sponsored the concert in a last-minute deal in 2019. In 2020, Barclaycard announced a three-year sponsorship deal with Global resulting in Barclaycard sponsoring the event from 2020-present.

== See also ==
- Summertime Ball
- Capital London
- Global Radio
