= Summertime Ball =

Annual UK summer music festival

- Mini-festival concert by Capital
- Arrangers: Global / Barclaycard
- Location: London, England
- Venue: Emirates Stadium (2009); Wembley Stadium (2010–present)
- Duration: 8 hours (2–10pm)
- No. of shows: One per year
- Attendance: 80,000
- Website: Official website

Capital's Summertime Ball is a mini-festival in London, usually held on either first or second Saturday or Sunday of June by the radio station Capital. The first ball was at Emirates Stadium in 2009, and it has since been held at Wembley Stadium. The 2020 Summertime Ball was to be held at the Tottenham Hotspur Stadium because Wembley was due to host games of Euro 2020, but was eventually cancelled due to the COVID-19 pandemic. The concert is subsequently shown on ITV1 and ITVX as best bits from the event.

== History ==
The event is promoted and broadcast by the Capital network. There have been five different sponsors and lead partners since its first event. From 2012 until 2018, Vodafone UK was the sponsor. In 2009, Barclaycard sponsored the ball. In 2010 ASOS.com sponsored the event, with Starbucks sponsoring the event in 2011. There was no official sponsor in 2019, although Apple Music was a presenting partner for that year's edition in a last-minute deal. Barclaycard once again sponsored the event from 2022, and remains the present sponsor, also sponsoring the Jingle Bell Ball.

== Event by year ==
=== 2009 ===
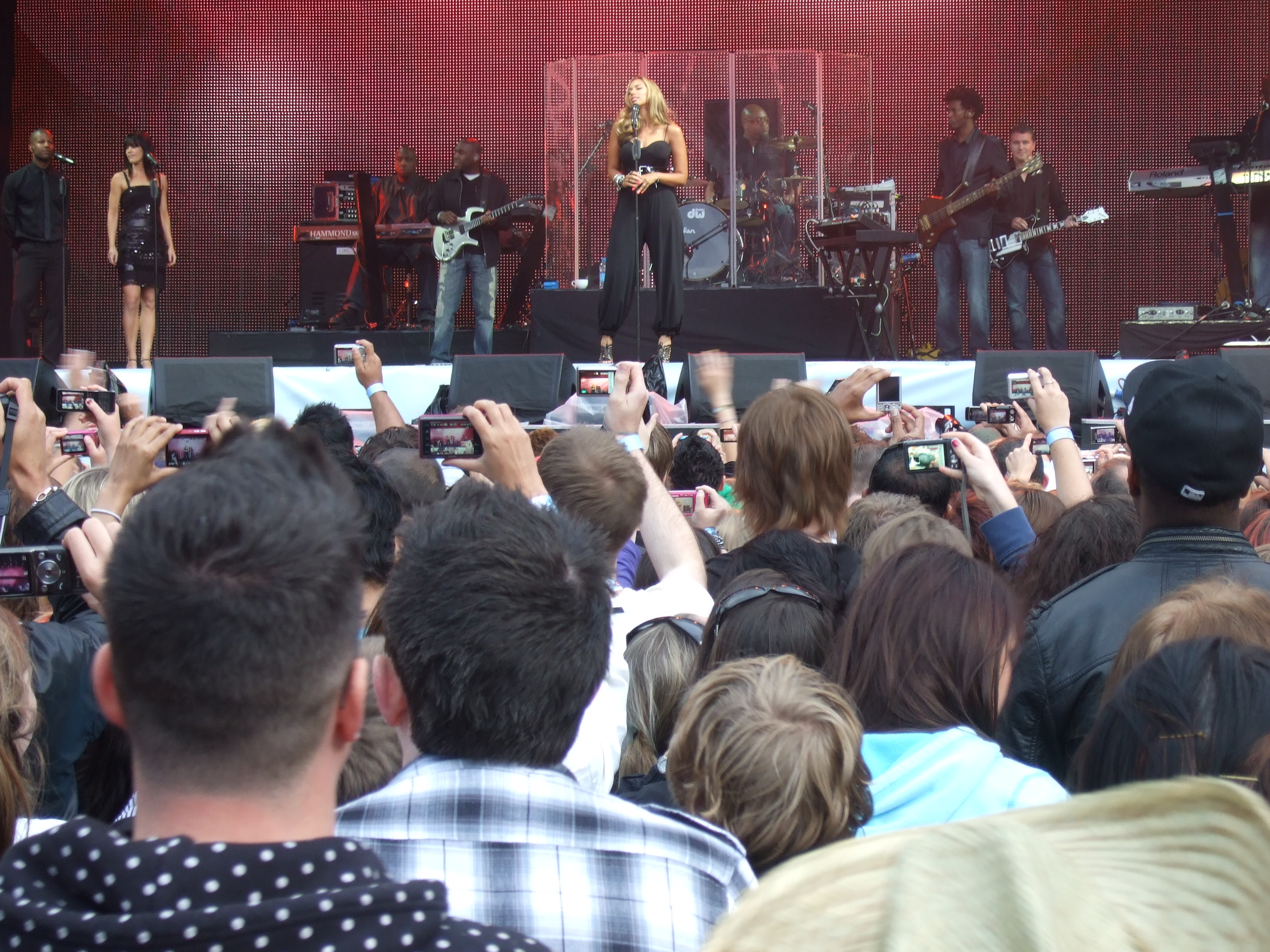
Leona Lewis headlining the first Summertime Ball.

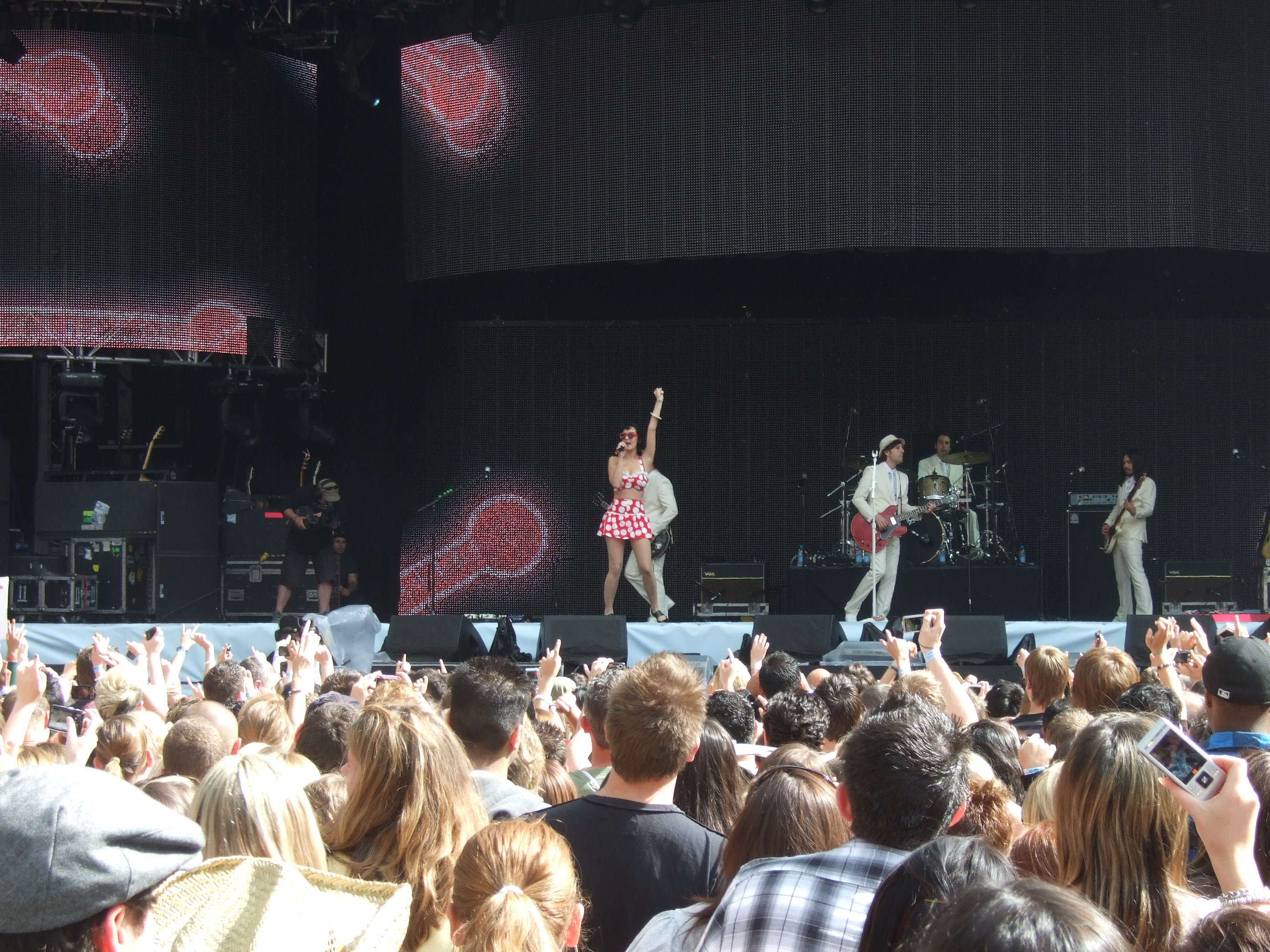
Katy Perry performing during the inaugural edition of the ball.

The first Summertime Ball took place on Sunday 7 June at Wembley Stadium, with headline acts Kelly Clarkson, Leona Lewis and Akon. The supporting headliners were Blue and Katy Perry.

The event was hosted by Capital London presenters Rich Clarke, Kat Shoob, Lisa Snowdon and Johnny Vaughan, and was sponsored by Barclaycard.

2009 Summertime Ball Stars

Kelly Clarkson
Leona Lewis
Akon
Blue
Katy Perry
James Morrison
JLS
Mark Ronson
Calvin Harris
The Saturdays
Shontelle
Noisettes
Ciara
Enrique Iglesias
Alesha Dixon
Dizzee Rascal
Daniel Merriweather

=== 2010 ===
Summertime Ball took place on Sunday 6 June at Wembley Stadium. The backstage action ran from 10am to 4pm, while the Ball itself started at 4pm and ended at 9:30pm. It was hosted by Capital Breakfast DJs Johnny Vaughan and Lisa Snowdon.

Stars of the 2010 Summertime Ball

Rihanna
Usher
Justin Bieber
Cheryl Cole
JLS
Ke$ha
Dizzee Rascal
Scouting for Girls
Alexandra Burke
Jason Derulo
Iyaz
Pixie Lott
Chipmunk
Ellie Goulding
The Wanted
Tinie Tempah
Esmee Denters
will.i.am
Labrinth
Sean Kingston
Florence and the Machine

=== 2011 ===
The Summertime Ball 2011 was sponsored by Starbucks and took place on Sunday 12 June at Wembley Stadium. American singer Jennifer Lopez was the headline act for this year's ball. Tickets for the event sold out on 3 June 2011. However, in the weeks running up to the Summertime Ball, Capital held on-air competitions to allow listeners to win tickets to the event.

2011 Summertime Ball Stars

Jennifer Lopez
JLS
Jessie J
Enrique Iglesias
Nicole Scherzinger
The Wanted
Cee Lo Green
LMFAO
Mike Posner
Alexis Jordan
Far East Movement
Katy B
Example
Wretch 32
Mann
Ne-Yo

Surprise & Guest Acts

Dev & The Cataracs
Lauren Bennett
Natalia Kills
Devlin

The first Summertime Ball to be aired across the Capital network of radio stations was presented by James 'The Bassman' Bassam, Greg Burns and Rich Clarke. Roberto presented interactive content and Kat Shoob was a backstage reporter.

=== 2012 ===
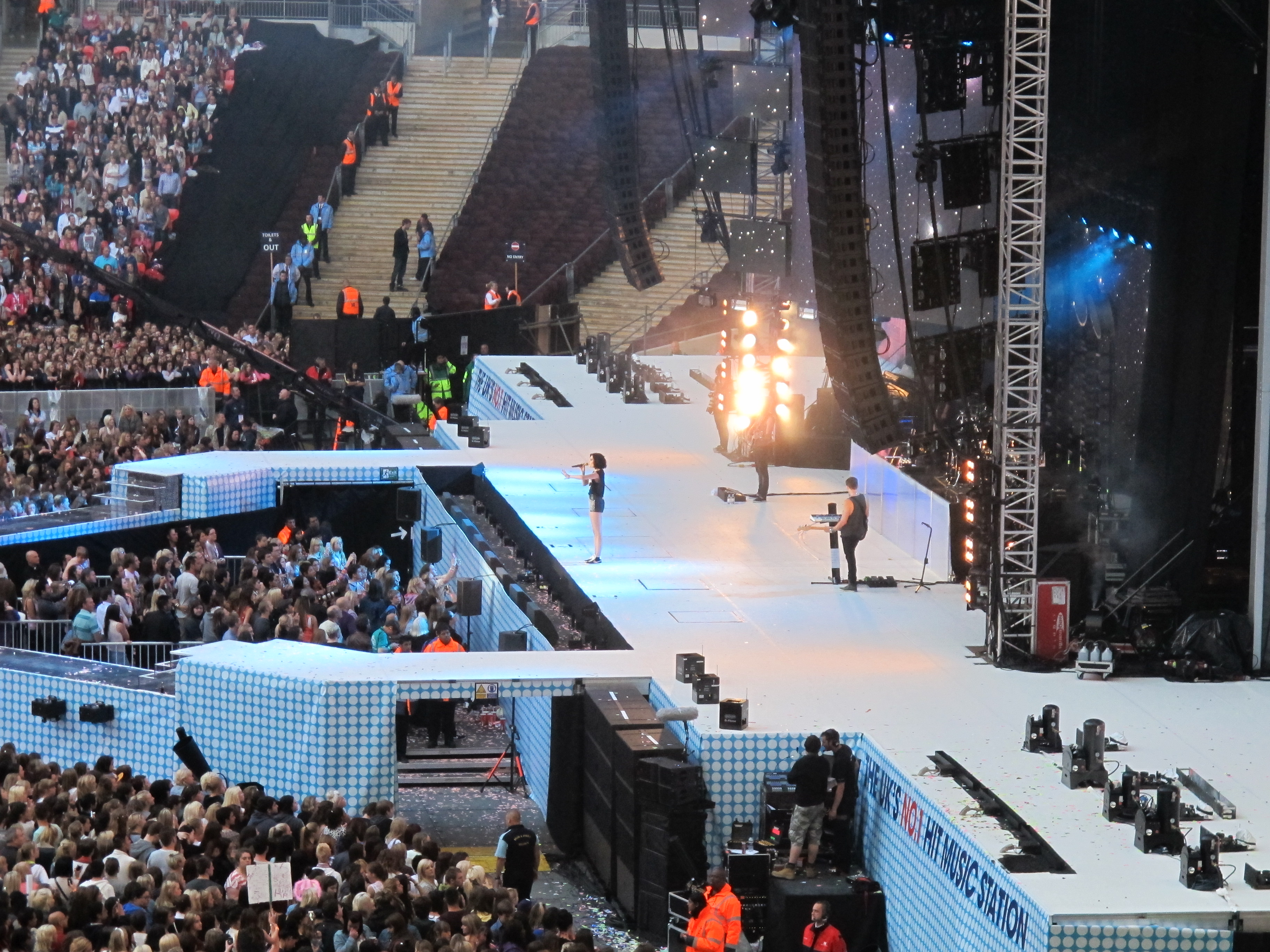
Jessie J performing at the 2012 edition.

The Summertime Ball 2012 was sponsored by Vodafone and took place at Wembley Stadium on Saturday 9 June 2012. Katy Perry and Coldplay were both headline acts for this year's ball, with Justin Bieber and Jessie J being supporting headline acts. The line-up for this year's event was announced on localised Capital Breakfast shows across the United Kingdom on 21 April 2012. This year the event features a brand new logo. Ticketmaster sold out in all categories.

2012 Summertime Ball Stars

Katy Perry
Coldplay
Justin Bieber
Usher
Ed Sheeran
The Wanted
Jessie J
Kelly Clarkson
Flo Rida
Example
Pitbull
Rita Ora
Conor Maynard

Surprise Acts

Cover Drive
Lawson
Dizzee Rascal
Cheryl

Special Guests

Rizzle Kicks
Carly Rae Jepsen

=== 2013 ===
The 2013 Summertime Ball was held on Saturday 8 June 2013 at Wembley Stadium. It was announced on 24 April 2013 that Justin Timberlake would be the guest presenter hosting the ball for 2013. Tickets went on sale on Friday 26 April at 8 am, and sold out in under 2 hours. The 2013 Vodafone Summertime Ball featured the most acts ever for a single Capital FM ball with 21 performers. The headliners, Robbie Williams and Taylor Swift made their ball debuts on Saturday 8 June, with will.i.am, performing at his fourth ball, but his first one solo, and Olly Murs, who made his debut Summertime Ball performance, being the supporting headline acts. The Wanted's fourth appearance at this ball made them the most frequent performers at the Summertime Ball. Band member Nathan Sykes returned after having major throat surgery earlier on in the year, making this his first performance after his throat surgery. Justin Timberlake also performed at the event, despite only being listed as a host rather than a performer.

2013 Summertime Ball Stars

Taylor Swift
Robbie Williams
Justin Timberlake
will.i.am
Olly Murs
Jessie J
The Wanted
Labrinth
The Saturdays
Ellie Goulding
Lawson
Rizzle Kicks
Union J
Disclosure
AlunaGeorge
Robin Thicke
Naughty Boy
Rudimental
Duke Dumont
James Arthur
Psy

Special Guests

Eliza Doolittle
Sam Smith
Ella Henderson
B.o.B
A*M*E
Ella Eyre
John Newman
Ed Sheeran

DJ Sets

Marvin Humes

Host

Justin Timberlake

=== 2014 ===
The 2014 Summertime Ball was officially announced by Capital FM on Monday 28 April 2014, and the announcement stated that ticket and venue details will be announced the following week. On 6 May, it was confirmed that the ball would return to Wembley for the fifth consecutive time and be held on Saturday 21 June. The first headliner, Miley Cyrus was announced on 7 May. The full line-up followed on 8 May, with Pharrell Williams and David Guetta as other headliners. Calvin Harris, Ed Sheeran, Little Mix and Enrique Iglesias were later revealed to be the supporting headliners of the mini-festival. Tickets officially went on sale the following day. Marvin Humes opened the show with an introductory DJ set.

2014 Summertime Ball Stars

Miley Cyrus
Pharrell Williams
David Guetta
Little Mix
Ed Sheeran
Enrique Iglesias
Cheryl
5 Seconds of Summer
Calvin Harris
Ellie Goulding
The Vamps
Jessie J
Iggy Azalea
Rita Ora
Foxes
Clean Bandit
Ella Henderson
Austin Mahone
Duke Dumont
Union J
Kiesza
Rixton

Special Guests

Jess Glynne
Charli XCX
Nathan Sykes
DJ Cassidy
Kelli-Leigh
Jax Jones

Introductory DJ Set

Marvin Humes

=== 2015 ===
The 2015 Summertime Ball returned to Wembley for the sixth consecutive time and was held on Saturday 6 June 2015. The show sold out within the second few hours of ticket shows. On 27 April 2015 One Direction announced they were going to be the first headliners for the show. LunchMoney Lewis was added to the lineup on 19 May, with Rixton, Carly Rae Jepsen and Nick Jonas being added the following day. Former The Wanted star Nathan Sykes joined the lineup on 22 May. After appearing at the ball four times together with The Wanted and joining Jessie J on stage at the Summertime Ball last year plus his awaited performance this year, it was Sykes' sixth consecutive appearance since 2010 making him the most performed act to date. Sam Smith was due to perform, but withdrew from the show due to illness. Kelly Clarkson performed bare foot at this ball.

2015 Summertime Ball Stars

Ariana Grande
One Direction
Avicii
Little Mix
Sam Smith (Pulled Out)
Olly Murs
Kelly Clarkson
Jason Derulo
Flo Rida
Carly Rae Jepsen
Pitbull
Meghan Trainor
Martin Garrix
Rita Ora
Ne-Yo
Fifth Harmony
Jess Glynne
Rixton
Omi
Nathan Sykes
LunchMoney Lewis
Nick Jonas

Special Guests

Tinie Tempah

Introductory DJ Set

Marvin Humes

=== 2016 ===
The Summertime Ball returned to Wembley for the seventh consecutive year on Saturday 11 June 2016.

Little Mix and Tinie Tempah were the headliners for 2016.

Zayn Malik was due to perform at the event, but pulled out last minute due to nervous health issues and later apologized to fans

2016 Summertime Ball Stars

Ariana Grande
Craig David
Dizzee Rascal
Clean Bandit & Louisa Johnson
Flo Rida
Jess Glynne
Jillionaire
Little Mix
Lukas Graham
Marvin Humes DJ Set
Mike Posner
MNEK
Nathan Sykes
Nick Jonas
Tinie Tempah
Sigala
The Vamps
Will.i.am
Years & Years
WSTRN

Surprise Acts

Dizzee Rascal

Special Guests

Lydia Lucy
Imani Williams
John Newman
Bryn Christopher
Katy B
Zara Larsson

Capital Weekender Introductory DJ Set

Marvin Humes

=== 2017 ===
The Capital Summertime Ball with Vodafone returned to Wembley Stadium on Saturday 10 June 2017 with the event being announced on Friday 28 April 2017 by Roman Kemp and Vick Hope via London's Capital Breakfast show. They announced 7 acts per-day from Monday 7 May until Wednesday 9 May and the headlining act was announced on Thursday 10 May with tickets going on sale the same day and selling out in 30 minutes. Maroon 5 pulled out of the event and were replaced by Liam Payne and Sigala on Thursday 8 June. Bruno Mars and Little Mix headlined the event with Shawn Mendes and Niall Horan as supporting headliners.

Capital FM produced three programs dedicated to this event: on 10 June 2017, it broadcast live backstage from 6 am to 3 pm with Rob Howard, Will Cozens and Jimmy Hill, then live coverage from Wembley from 3 pm to 11 pm by three presenters in order: Ant Payne, Vick Hope and The Bassman, and finally JJ ran an "Afterparty" edition until 2 am at night; on the next day, JJ reviewed every best moment from the event on his slot 7–10 pm. After this, the network moved back to normal programming. Highlights of the event were aired on Capital TV from 7:00 pm to 10:30 pm on the day of the ball. This was the final performance of Dua Lipa and Sean Paul together with their song No Lie.

2017 Summertime Ball Stars

Bruno Mars
Little Mix
Maroon 5 (Pulled Out)
Shawn Mendes
Niall Horan
Charlie Puth
Zedd
Olly Murs
Stormzy
Dua Lipa
Zara Larsson
Anne-Marie
5 After Midnight
James Arthur
JP Cooper
Louisa Johnson
Sean Paul
Jax Jones & Raye
Julia Michaels
Martin Jensen
Rag'n'Bone Man
Sigala
Liam Payne

Special Guests

Hailee Steinfeld
Ella Eyre
Imani Williams
Craig David

Introductory DJ Set

Marvin Humes

=== 2018 ===
The Capital Summertime Ball returned to Wembley on Saturday 9 June 2018 and was announced by Roman Kemp and Vick Hope across London on Capital Breakfast on Friday 28 April. 5 acts were announced everyday from Monday 30 April 2018 until 3 May 2018. Tickets went on sale on Thursday 3 May 2018 and sold out in 5 days. Shawn Mendes and Camila Cabello headlined the event, with Rita Ora and Charlie Puth as supporting headliners. Marvin Humes did a DJ set from 2:40 pm before the main show began at 3 pm.

2018 Summertime Ball Stars

Shawn Mendes
Camila Cabello
Charlie Puth
Rita Ora
Rudimental
Jess Glynne
Jax Jones
Clean Bandit
Stefflon Don
Jonas Blue
Yungen
Craig David
Anne-Marie
Mabel
James Arthur
Sean Paul
Sigala
Raye
G-Eazy
Years & Years

Special Guests

Demi Lovato
Louisa Johnson
Ramz
Not3s
Ella Eyre
Dan Caplen
Yxng Bane
JP Cooper
Dakota
Jack & Jack
HRVY
Paloma Faith

Introductory DJ Set

Marvin Humes

=== 2019 ===
The 2019 Summertime Ball was held on Saturday, 8 June 2019 at Wembley for the 10th consecutive year. The lineup was announced on Capital Breakfast with Roman Kemp, Vick Hope and Sonny Jay from Monday, 29 April 2019. The lineup was announced by being revealed on billboards across the United Kingdom. The person who spotted the 'Ballboards' had to text 83958 with their location and the artist they saw and as a result of confirming an artist Kemp would give the caller a pair of tickets to this year's event.

The headliner was announced to be Calvin Harris on 2 May 2019. Marvin Humes did an Introductory DJ Set at 2:00 pm, with the show starting at 2:30 pm BST and finishing at approximately 10 pm BST. Roman Kemp, Vick Hope and Sonny Jay hosted the Ball. Tickets sold out six days after they went on sale.

There was also a livestream on the Capital FM website, the Global Player app and on Capital's channel on Apple News which started at 2:30 pm BST hosted by Vick Hope, Jimmy Hill and Marvin Humes (as Backstage Reporter). The livestream was also available to watch on Capital's TikTok page hosted by HRVY. Highlights & vlogs of the 2019 Summertime Ball were uploaded to Capital's and other people's YouTube channels from Sunday 9 June 2019. There were also Ball updates on Capital's Instagram, Twitter and Facebook pages.

2019 Summertime Ball Stars

Calvin Harris
Mark Ronson
5 Seconds of Summer
Maroon 5
Jess Glynne
Sigala
Anne Marie
Jonas Blue
Sigrid
Mabel
Tom Walker
Ava Max
Khalid
Jax Jones
Jonas Brothers
Ellie Goulding
Lauv
Halsey
Rita Ora

Hosts

Roman Kemp
Vick Hope
Sonny Jay

Special Guests

HRVY
Goodboys
Ella Eyre
Becky Hill
Raye
Stefflon Don
Busted

Introductory DJ Set

Marvin Humes

=== 2020 and 2021: COVID-19 cancellation ===
The 2020 Summertime Ball was due to be hosted on Saturday 6 June 2020 at Tottenham Hotspur Stadium. However, on 19 March 2020, Capital announced that it had cancelled the Ball due to the COVID-19 pandemic and Government issued advice surrounding the event. On 6 May 2020, Capital announced a replacement event called The Best of the Capital Summertime Ball. The two-hour special showcased highlights from the previous decade and was shown on Sky One, Capital FM, YouTube and Global Player from 5:00 pm BST on 16 May.

The ball was cancelled for the same reason in 2021. However, unlike 2020, there was no replacement.

=== 2022 ===
For the first time since 2019, Capital FM Summertime Ball returned to Wembley Stadium on 12 June 2022. The lineup was confirmed on the Capital Breakfast show on 25 and 26 April. There was a Global Player presale that took place on the 26th with general sale taking place on the 28th.

2022 Summertime Ball Stars

**Ed Sheeran**
Maisie Peters
Aitch
Tate McRae
A1xJ1
Jax Jones
Lauren Spencer-Smith
Becky Hill
Eddie Benjamin
Sigala
Mimi Webb
Nathan Dawe
KSI
Gayle
Sam Ryder
Mabel
George Ezra
Joel Corry
Arrdee
Anne-Marie
**Harry Styles**
**David Guetta**

Special Guests

Ella Henderson
Ella Eyre
MNEK
Talia Mar

Introductory DJ Set

MistaJam
Marvin Humes

Hosts

Roman Kemp Sonny Jay Sian Welby

=== 2023 ===
The 2023 Summertime Ball took place on 11 June at Wembley Stadium. The line-up was announced on 24 and 25 April.

It was hosted by Capital Breakfast's Roman Kemp, Siân Welby and Chris Stark. This was Stark's first Summertime Ball since joining the station in October 2022 and Kemp's last Summertime Ball as he confirmed his departure on Capital FM to focus on his television career. Highlights from the gig were shown on ITV (plus streaming services ITVX and STV Player) for the first time on 17 June 2023 from 7pm to 8:30pm BST.

2023 Summertime Ball Stars

**Kylie Minogue**
**Niall Horan**
**Calvin Harris**
**Jonas Brothers**
Adam Lambert
Anne-Marie
Sigala
Raye
Jess Glynne
Tom Grennan
Joel Corry
Mimi Webb
Zara Larsson
ArrDee
Coi Leray
Ellie Goulding
Flo
Jax Jones

Pulled Out

Lewis Capaldi

Special Guest

Calum Scott
Caity Baser
Mae Muller
MNEK

Introductory DJ Set

MistaJam
Rio Fredrika

Host

Roman Kemp
Siân Welby
Chris Stark

=== 2024 ===
The 2024 Summertime Ball took place on 16 June 2024 at Wembley Stadium.

Jordan North hosted the event for the first time since joining Capital in April 2024 after Roman Kemp left the station. Chris Stark and Kemi Rodgers also co-hosted the event. An announcement was made on Capital Breakfast on 26 April where North, Stark and Welby confirmed the ball's date and when the tickets go on sale on 1 May 2024. The line-up for the Summertime Ball was announced at 7 a.m. on 29 and 30 April on Capital Breakfast. Kemi Rodgers hosted the ball for the first time, as Welby announced on 4 June that she would be going on maternity leave and Rodgers would cover for her over the summer.

This was MistaJam’s last Summertime Ball DJ set before he announced his departure from "The Capital Weekender" on 29 June 2024.

2024 Summertime Ball Stars

**David Guetta**
Perrie
Jax Jones
Bradley Simpson
Benson Boone
Caity Baser
Rudimental
**Sabrina Carpenter**
Meghan Trainor
Aitch
Ella Henderson
Paul Russell
Becky Hill
Sugababes
**Raye**

Surprise Acts

Natasha Bedingfield
Shaboozey

Special Guests

Nathan Dawe
Natalie Horler
Charlotte Plank
Riko Dan

Introductory DJ Set

MistaJam

Hosts

Jordan North
Kemi Rodgers
Chris Stark

=== 2025 ===
The 2025 Summertime Ball took place on Sunday 15 June 2025 at Wembley Stadium. An announcement was made on Capital Breakfast on 25 April where North, Stark and Welby confirmed the date and when the tickets go on sale. The line-up for the Summertime Ball was announced at 7am on 28 & 29 April. Tickets for the ball will go on sale at 9am on 30 April. Tickets to this year's ball went on to sell out in just over 8 hours. On 13 June 2025 it was announced that Jade would open the show. Doors will open at 1:30pm with the ball kicking off at 3:30pm and wrapping up at 9:30pm. Saturday 14 June will be Soundcheck Saturday.

For the first time since 2019, the breakfast presenters will not have an on-air backstage show at the Summertime Ball. However, Jordan North, Chris Stark and Siân Welby will provide backstage updates all weekend for those listening on Capital. ITV1 aired highlights on 22 June 2025 at 5:30pm.

2025 Summertime Ball Stars
**Mariah Carey**
**Will Smith & DJ Jazzy Jeff**
JADE
Zara Larsson
Busted vs McFly
Jessie J
Lola Young
KSI
Benson Boone
Dasha
Reneé Rapp
Tate McRae
Myles Smith
Remember Monday
James Hype
Rita Ora
Barclaycard Out of the Blue Surprise Act

JLS

Introductory DJ Set

Kem Cetinay

Hosts

Jordan North
Siân Welby
Chris Stark

=== 2026 ===
The 2026 Summertime Ball took place on Saturday 6 June 2026 at Wembley Stadium. An announcement was made on Capital Breakfast on 27 April where North, Stark and Welby confirmed the date and when the tickets go on sale. The line-up for the Summertime Ball was announced at 7am on 28 & 29 April. Tickets for the ball went on sale at 9am on 30 April. On 7 May, Take That were added to the line-up

Once again Capital broadcast the ball live on air across the UK with the following schedule.

9am-midday: Capital’s Summertime Ball with Barclaycard LIVE with Jimmy Hill

12-4pm: Capital’s Summertime Ball with Barclaycard LIVE with Aimee Vivian

4-7pm: Capital’s Summertime Ball with Barclaycard LIVE with Sonny Jay

7-11pm: Capital’s Summertime Ball with Barclaycard LIVE with Will Manning

2026 Summertime Ball Stars are listed in the order they performed; headliners are in bold.

2026 Summertime Ball Stars

Take That
Bebe Rexha
MEEK
Jason Derulo
Sekou
Robyn
Lola Young
December 10
Stephen Sanchez
Fatboy Slim
XG
Niall Horan
Sienna Spiro
Myles Smith
**Calvin Harris**
**RAYE**

Barclaycard Out of the Blue Surprise Act

Mis-Teeq

Introductory DJ Set

Kem Cetinay

Hosts

Jordan North
Siân Welby
Chris Stark

=== 2027 ===
This ball is due for Saturday 5th June 2027 at Wembley Stadium. It will be hosted by Jordan Chris and Sian

== See also ==
- Global Radio
- Jingle Bell Ball
