= Roman Kemp =

British TV and radio presenter (born 1993)

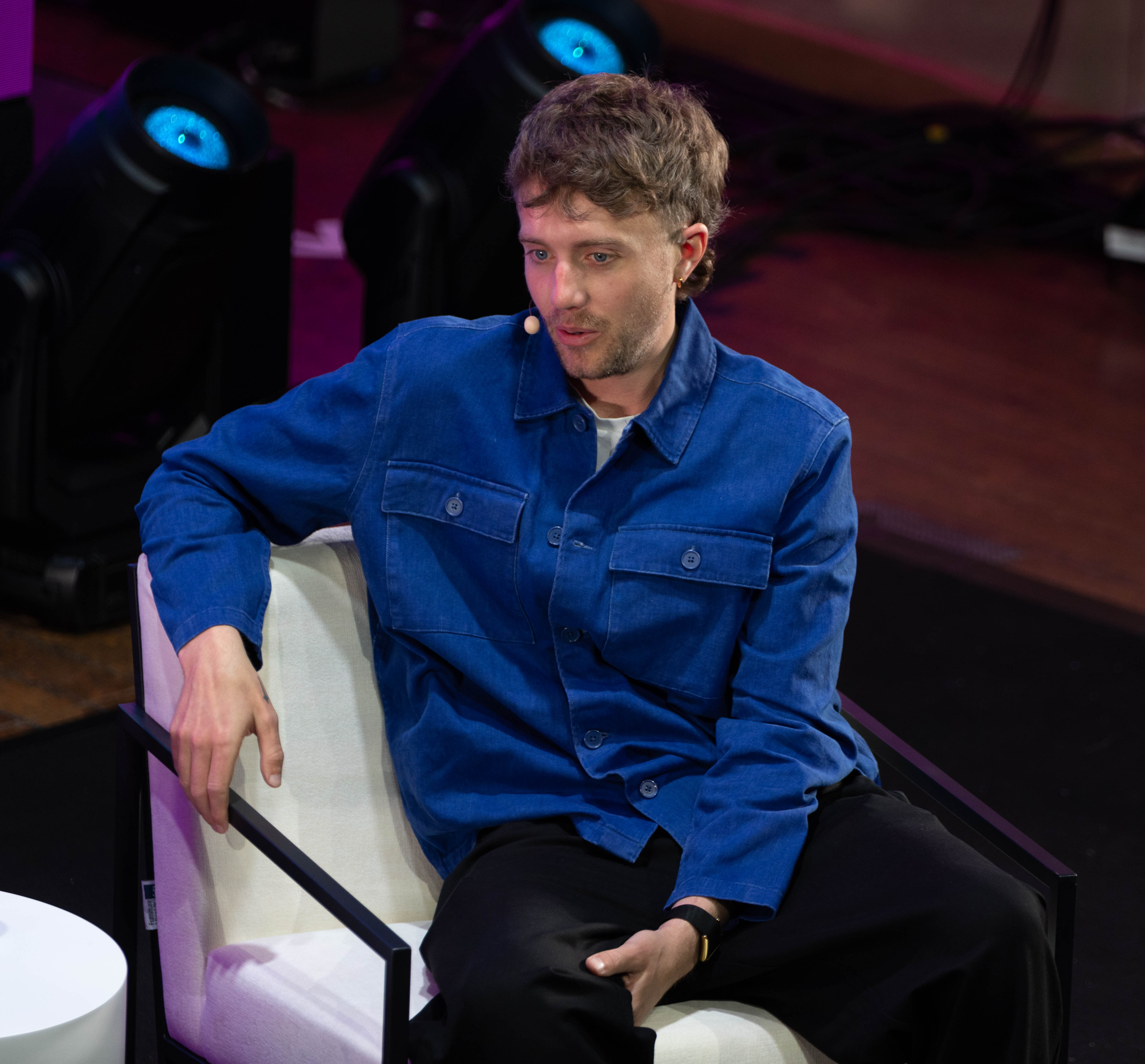
- Kemp in 2026
- Born: Roman Kemp; 28 January 1993 (age 33); Los Angeles, California, US
- Citizenship: United Kingdom; United States
- Occupations: Radio presenter; television presenter; television personality
- Years active: 2014–present
- Employers: Global (2014–2024); BBC; ITV; Channel 4; 4Music
- Parents: Martin Kemp (father); Shirlie Holliman (mother)
- Relatives: Gary Kemp (uncle)

Roman Kemp (born 28 January 1993) is an American-born British television presenter and podcast host. He presented The One Show on BBC One. From 2017 to 2024, he presented the national radio network Capital FM breakfast show. In 2019, he finished in third place in the 19th series of I'm a Celebrity...Get Me Out of Here!. In 2025, he and his sister Harleymoon Kemp won the third series of Celebrity Race Across the World.

== Early life ==
Kemp was born on 28 January 1993 in Los Angeles. He is the son of English parents, the actor and musician Martin Kemp and the singer Shirlie Holliman. George Michael was his godfather. Kemp was educated at Berkhamsted School, a private day school in Berkhamsted, Hertfordshire, until he was 15.

== Career ==
=== 2010s ===
In November 2014, Kemp joined Capital FM to present Sunday 6–9 am. He was promoted to Saturday 5–8 pm and Sunday 9 pm – 12 am a year later, where he had the chance to interview artists on his show. In February 2016, Kemp became the new face of The Capital Evening Show, weeknights 7–10 pm in addition to his Sunday show. In 2017, Kemp started hosting Capital Breakfast from 6 am–10 am with Vick Hope across London and Saturday 6 am–9 am across the Network. As a result, he left the evening show. In 2018, Sonny Jay joined Capital Breakfast full-time as a co-presenter.

In 2016, Kemp was The X Factor UK's digital presenter and social media correspondent. He also co-hosted Nick Kicks on Nicktoons. Since January 2017, he has co-presented 2Awesome on ITV2 with Vick Hope. He also presented The Hot Desk on ITV2. From 2 May 2017, Kemp took over Capital FM London's breakfast show with Hope. He narrated Bromans on ITV2 in 2017, in which his father played Emperor. He appeared in an episode of Len Goodman's Partners in Rhyme. He took part in a celebrity edition of First Dates for Stand Up to Cancer in November 2017.

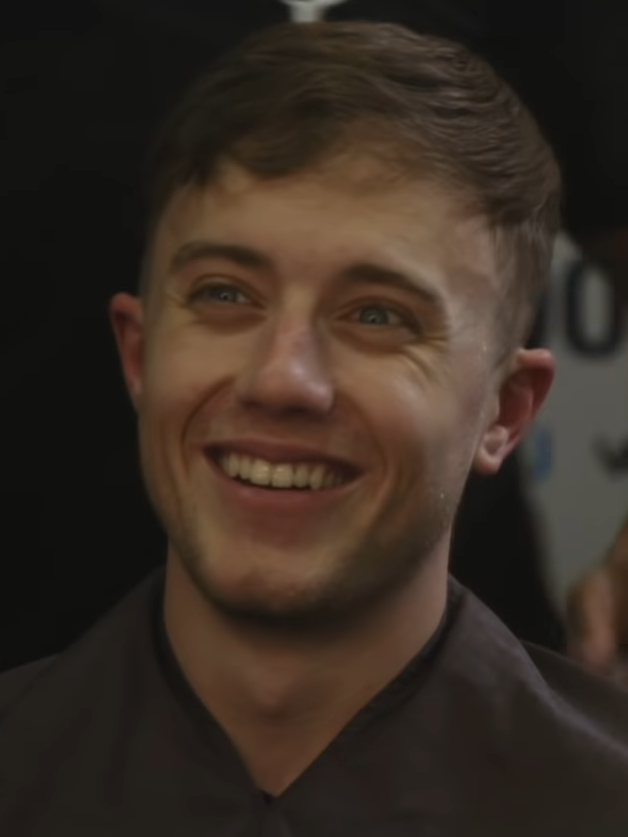
Kemp in 2019

In November 2017, Kemp was the backstage reporter on Children in Need Rocks the 80s. On 1 March 2018, Kemp hosted the Global Awards alongside Rochelle Humes and Myleene Klass, and returned to present the 2019 Global Awards. On 8 April 2019, Kemp, Hope and Jay became the hosts of the new Capital National Breakfast. In May 2019, it was announced that he would play in the 2019 edition of Soccer Aid, representing the Rest of the World due to his birth in Los Angeles allowing him to be classed as American. Since June 2019, Kemp has appeared in the Channel 4 reality series Celebrity Gogglebox alongside his father. In 2019, Kemp was a contestant on the nineteenth series of the ITV reality series I'm a Celebrity...Get Me Out of Here!. Kemp finished in third place. Kemp has also presented London's New Year celebration show twice in 2017 and 2019 alongside performers Nile Rodgers, Chic and Craig David respectively.

=== 2020s ===
In 2020, Kemp co-hosted a Sunday morning programme with his father, titled Martin & Roman's Sunday Best! on ITV from 14 June 2020. On 19 November 2020, Kemp featured as a guest panellist on the ITV Daytime show Loose Women and was part of the first all male panel in the show's 21-year history. In March 2021, Kemp presented a documentary on BBC Three, Roman Kemp: Our Silent Emergency, exploring the mental health and suicide crisis affecting young men. His friend, producer Joe Lyons, took his own life in August 2020.

From April 2021, Kemp and Martin Kemp presented Martin & Roman's Weekend Best!, a spin-off of Martin & Roman's Sunday Best!

He presented the 2023 BBC documentary Boot Dreams: Now or Never, about young footballers trying to gain a professional contract. Since July 2023, Kemp has co-presented the game show The Finish Line on BBC1 with Sarah Greene.

In November 2023, Kemp presented a documentary on BBC Three, Roman Kemp: The Fight for Young Lives, exploring potential solutions for improving the mental health of young people in the UK.

On 8 October 2023, it was reported that Kemp would be departing from Capital Breakfast as main host after seven years, due to his new career being a television presenter for BBC and ITV1. On 19 February 2024, he announced that he would present his final show on 28 March 2024. After leaving, he explained that it was to avoid reliving the day in 2020 when, in the middle of his radio show, he found out about producer Joe Lyons' death.

On 2 March 2024, he hosted the annual BRIT Awards alongside Maya Jama and Clara Amfo.

In 2025, Kemp returned to play in the annual Soccer Aid charity match for UNICEF, joining the England squad at Old Trafford.

== Personal life ==
Kemp is a close friend of the English singer-songwriter Tom Grennan. They host a podcast on BBC Sounds called You About?, and have appeared together on the Write Me Dirty podcast. In the documentary, Roman Kemp: Our Silent Emergency, Kemp said that he came close to attempting suicide after battling with depression for 13 years. In the documentary, Roman Kemp: The Fight for Young Lives, Kemp further revealed that he has dealt with depression since he was 15 years old, and has taken sertraline for 12 years.

Kemp is a supporter of Arsenal F.C.

Kemp also holds British and American citizenship.

== Filmography ==
=== Film ===
Year	Title	Role	Notes
2024	Wallace and Gromit Vengeance Most Fowl		Voice cameo role
2026	Shaun the Sheep: The Beast of Mossy Bottom	Pizza Boy	Voice

=== Television ===
Year	Title	Channel	Role	Notes
2016	The X Factor UK	ITV	Presenter	Digital presenter and social media correspondent
2016–2017	The Hot Desk	ITV2	Presenter	
2016–2017	Nick Kicks	Nicktoons	Presenter	
2017	Children in Need Rocks the 80s	BBC One	Presenter	Backstage presenter
2017	2Awesome	ITV2	Co-Presenter	With Vick Hope
2017	Bromans	ITV2	Narrator	
2017	Celebrity First Dates	Channel 4	Contestant	For Stand Up to Cancer
2017, 2019	New Year's Eve Fireworks	BBC One	Presenter	With Nile Rodgers and Chic (2017); With Craig David Band and TS5 DJ Set (2019)
2018–2020	Global Awards	Capital TV	Co-Presenter	With Rochelle Humes and Myleene Klass (2018–2019); With Rochelle Humes and Kate Garraway (2020)
2019	I'm a Celebrity...Get Me Out of Here!	ITV	Contestant	Third place
2019–present	Celebrity Gogglebox	Channel 4	Himself	With Martin Kemp
2020	Martin & Roman's Sunday Best!	ITV	Co-Presenter	With Martin Kemp
2020, 2022	Loose Women	ITV	Panellist	Special "Loose Men"
2021	Roman Kemp: Our Silent Emergency	BBC Three	Himself	Documentary
2021	DNA Journey	ITV	Himself	With Martin Kemp
2021	Martin & Roman's Weekend Best!	ITV	Co-Presenter	With Martin Kemp
2022	Concert for Ukraine	ITV, STV	Co-Presenter	With Marvin Humes and Emma Bunton
2022–present	The One Show	BBC One	Co-presenter	Guest co-presenter (2022–2023)
2022–2023	Britain Get Singing	ITV	Host	With Alesha Dixon, Adam Lambert, Jason Manford and Will.i.am
2023	BRIT Awards: Red Carpet	ITV2	Co-Presenter	With Maya Jama and Clara Amfo
2023	Boot Dreams: Now or Never	BBC Three	Presenter	
2023	Capital’s Summertime Ball	ITV1	Co-host	with Chris Stark and Sian Welby
2023	Roman Kemp: The Fight for Young Lives	BBC Three	Presenter	Documentary
2023	Capital’s Jingle Bell Ball	ITV1	Co-host	With Chris Stark and Sian Welby
2023–present	The Finish Line	BBC One	Presenter	Series two commissioned
2024	The BRIT Awards	ITV1	Host	with Maya Jama and Clara Amfo
2025	Celebrity Race Across the World	BBC One	Himself	With Harley Moon
2025–present	Premier League Friday	Sky Sports News	Host	
2026	Just One Thing	BBC One	Co-presenter	With Clive Myrie and Zoe Ball
2026	Martin and Roman’s Irish Road Trip	Channel 4	Co-presenter	With Martin Kemp

=== Radio ===
Year	Title	Station	Role	Notes
2014–2015	Sunday 6–9 am	Capital	Presenter	
2015–2016	Saturday 5–8 pm	Capital	Presenter	
2015–2017	Sunday 9 am – 12 noon	Capital	Presenter	
2016–2017	The Capital Evening Show	Capital	Presenter	Weekdays 7–10
2017–2024	Capital Breakfast	Capital	Presenter	Weekdays

=== Web ===
Year	Title	Channel	Role	Notes
2021	Roman Kemp: Our Silent Emergency	BBC Three	Presenter	
2021	TRIC Awards	ScreenHits TV	Presenter	

== Awards and nominations ==
Year	Group	Award	Work	Results
2021	National Television Awards	Authored Documentary	Roman Kemp: Our Silent Emergency	Nominated
2021	TRIC Awards	Radio Personality	Himself	Won
2022	TRIC Awards	Radio Personality	Himself	Won
2023	TRIC Awards	Radio Personality	Himself	Won
