= The Finish Line (game show) =

UK TV quiz show

- Genre: Game show
- Presented by: Roman Kemp
- Starring: Sarah Greene
- Theme music composer: Medina Sound
- Country of origin: United Kingdom
- Original language: English
- No. of series: 4 (Regular); 1 (Festive); 1 (Famous)
- No. of episodes: 110 (Regular); 5 (Festive); 6 (Famous)

Production
- Running time: 45 minutes
- Production companies: Potato (2023–25); Bright Entertainment (2026–present); Nice One Productions (2023–present)

Original release
- Network: BBC One
- Release: 21 August 2023 – present

The Finish Line is a British game show that first aired on 21 August 2023, starring Roman Kemp as host and Sarah Greene as co-host. Five contestants compete in four rounds, each eliminating a contestant, with the one remaining contestant playing one final round in an attempt to win £5,000. The show sees these contestants answering quick-fire questions on moving podiums that are mounted on parallel lanes of a track, attempting to cross the finish line to remain in the game.

== Format ==
=== Rounds 1 to 3 (Pictures/Missing Letters/Pairs) ===
The contestants individually play a qualifying game to determine their lane assignments, attempting to give five correct answers in as short a time as possible. There is no penalty for a pass or miss, and the clock stops on the fifth correct answer or after 45 seconds have elapsed, whichever occurs first. The contestant with the shortest time is assigned to Lane 1, the second-shortest to Lane 2, and so on.

Each qualifier has a different format, as follows:

- Round 1 (Pictures): Given a category and a picture of an item fitting it, identify the picture.
- Round 2 (Missing Letters): Given a category and a string of blanks indicating the number of words/letters for an item fitting it, name the item. The first and last letters are already filled in. Example: "British Dish" and "T - - - / - - / - - - / - - - E" would be "TOAD IN THE HOLE."
- Round 3 (Pairs): Given a category and three pairs of answers, select the one pair whose answers both fit the category.

Correct answers to passed/missed questions are revealed by the co-host at the end of each contestant's turn.

For the race, the contestants stand at movable podiums within their lanes, initially positioned at the starting line. The host asks one question in turn to each contestant, starting with Lane 1. A correct answer starts/keeps the contestant moving forward, while a miss stops them or leaves them where they are if they are already stopped. Once a contestant passes the finish line, they sit out for the rest of the race. After every contestant but one has reached the finish line, the last one is eliminated from the game with no winnings.

=== Round 4 ===
No qualifier is played for this round; the two remaining contestants stand at the podiums and answer toss-up questions on the buzzer. A correct answer starts/keeps the contestant moving and leaves/stops the opponent, while a miss has the opposite effect. If no one buzzes-in on a question, both contestants stop. The first contestant to reach the finish line advances to the final, while the opponent misses out on a single jackpot.

=== Final ===
A red zone advances slowly down the back wall of the studio, at the same speed as the podiums, and approaches the contestant from behind as the host asks questions. Correct answers start/keep the contestant moving, but a pass or miss stops them. The contestant wins £5,000 if they can reach the finish line without being overtaken by the red zone, or nothing at all if they are caught.

== Transmissions ==
=== Regular ===
Series	Start date	End date	Episodes
1	21 August 2023	22 September 2023	25
2	6 May 2024	14 June 2024	30
3	10 March 2025	18 April 2025	30
4	9 March 2026	27 November 2026	25

=== Festive ===
Series	Start date	End date	Episodes
1	15 December 2025	19 December 2025	5

=== Famous ===
Series	Start date	End date	Episodes
1	7 November 2026	12 December 2026	6
