= I'm a Celebrity...Get Me Out of Here! (British TV series) series 19 =

19th series of British TV show

I'm a Celebrity...Get Me Out of Here!
- Series 19
- Presented by: Anthony McPartlin; Declan Donnelly
- No. of days: 22
- No. of castaways: 12
- Winner: Jacqueline Jossa
- Runner-up: Andy Whyment
- Companion show: I'm a Celebrity: Extra Camp
- No. of episodes: 22

Release
- Original network: ITV
- Original release: 17 November – 8 December 2019

Series chronology
- ← Previous; Series 18 Next → Series 20

I'm a Celebrity...Get Me Out of Here! returned for its nineteenth series on 17 November 2019 on ITV. This series featured Anthony McPartlin's return as the show's co-host, who was replaced by This Morning co-presenter Holly Willoughby in 2018, after deciding to take a year's hiatus from television. He appeared again alongside Declan Donnelly. The series opening episode was watched by 13.17 million people.

Due to the bushfires in and around the region, Australian authorities put a total fire ban into place. This means that there was no campfire for the first time in the show's history. Instead, camp mates were given a gas stove to cook on, and were required to pump gas as a replacement task to carrying firewood. Additionally, fireworks and sparklers could not be used when contestants crossed the exit bridge after being voted out of the jungle like in previous years, so they were replaced by confetti cannons. Also, despite it still being used as a prop in the jungle setup, the bath was not allowed to be used because of potential health problems due to the rusting of the metal.

A constant change in this series was the end of Bushtucker Trials involving the eating of live bugs. Whilst the stars can still be covered in live bugs, all bugs eaten will already be dead. This change was welcomed by wildlife experts and activists, including wildlife presenter Chris Packham.

On 8 December 2019, the series was won by Jacqueline Jossa, with Andy Whyment finishing as the runner-up. Whyment would return to the series four years later to participate in I'm a Celebrity... South Africa alongside other former contestants to try to become the first I'm a Celebrity legend. Whyment became the joint fourth and fifth celebrity to be eliminated alongside series 17 winner Toff.

== Celebrities ==
The line-up was confirmed on 11 November 2019. On 20 November, ITV confirmed that Andrew Whyment and Cliff Parisi would join the series as the annual late arrivals. Of the contestants, Jenner previously participated on the 2003 American edition I'm a Celebrity under her pre-transition identity of Bruce Jenner.

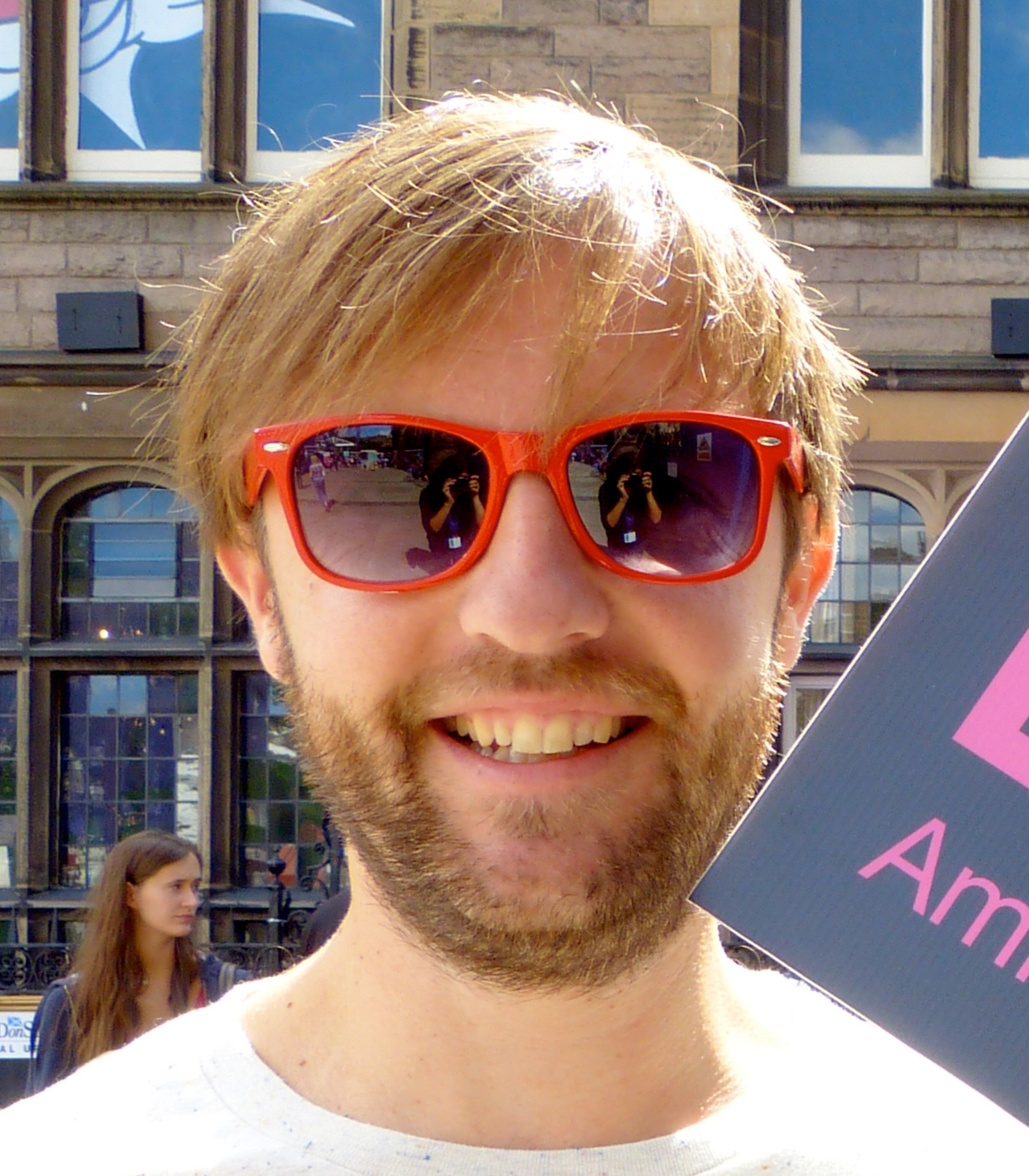
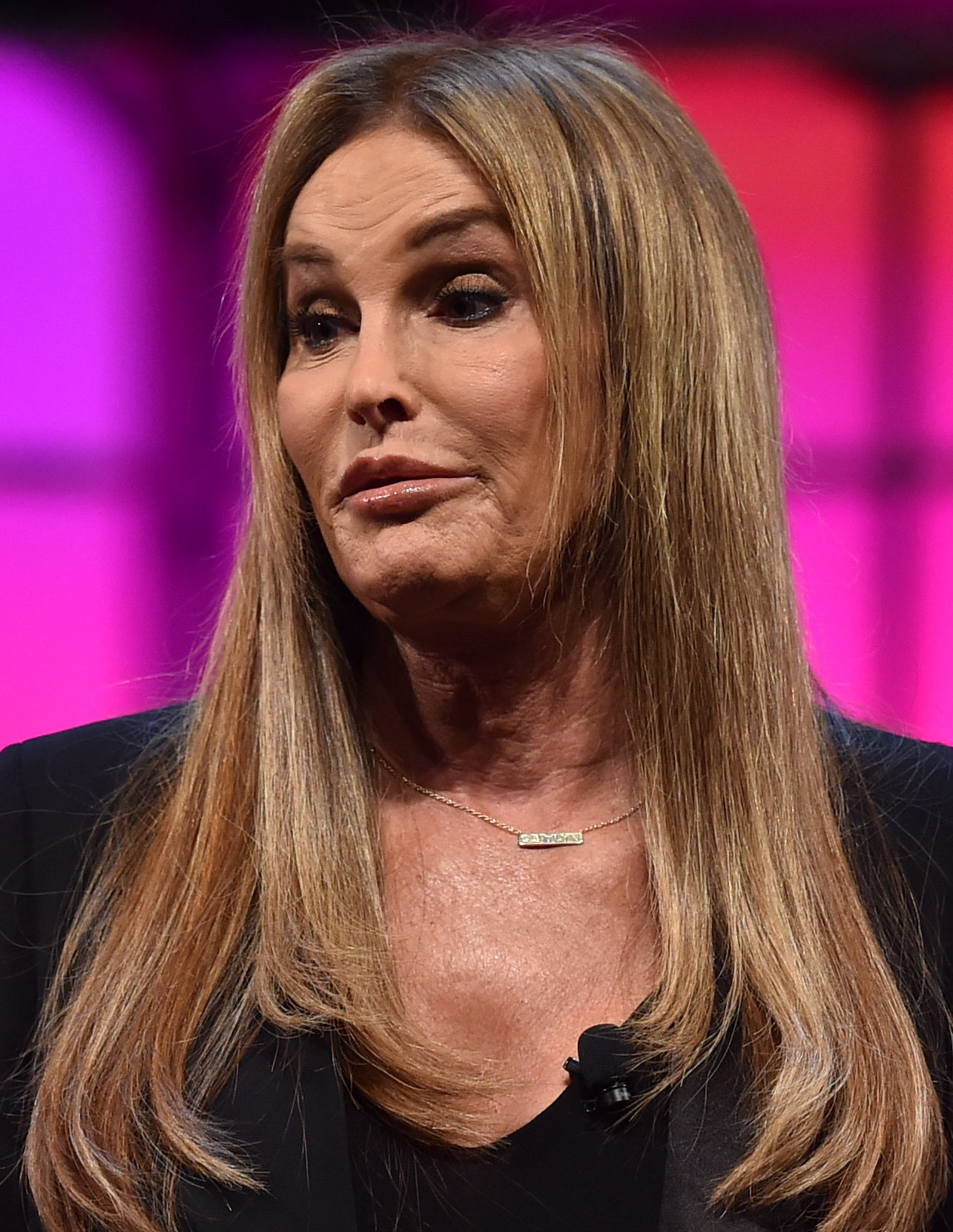
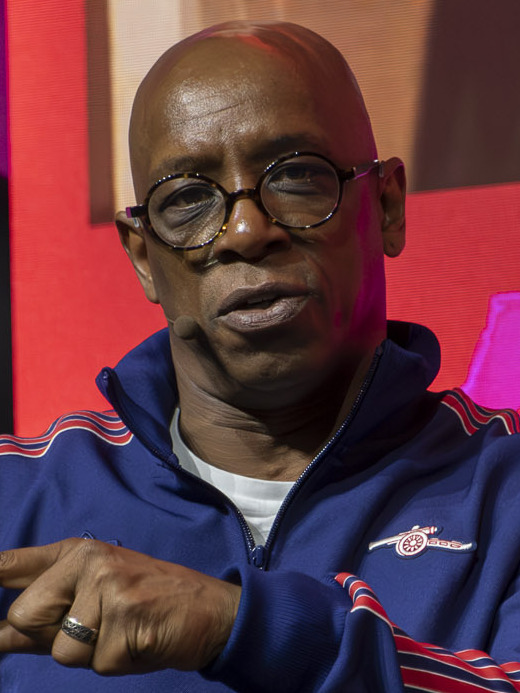
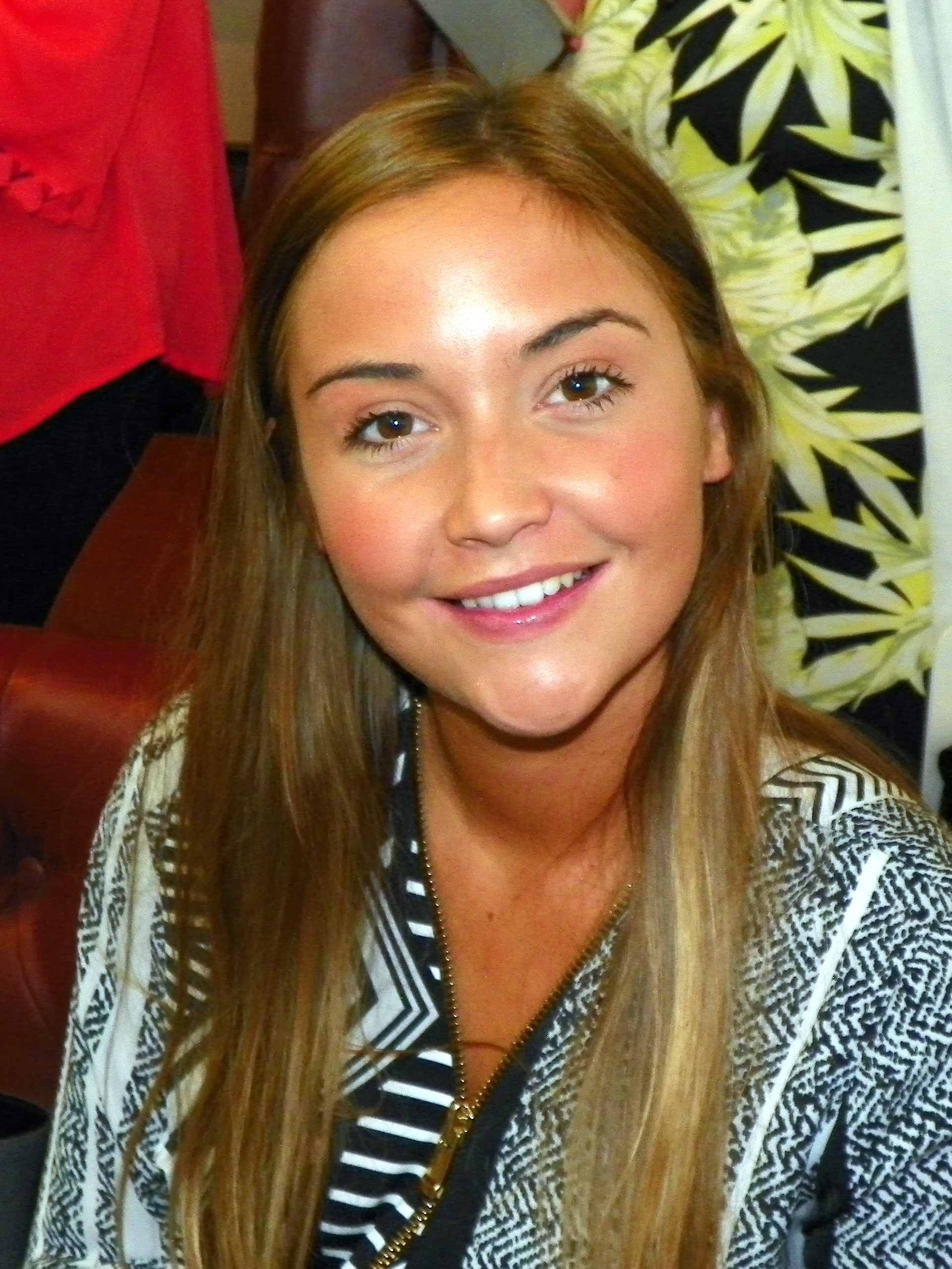
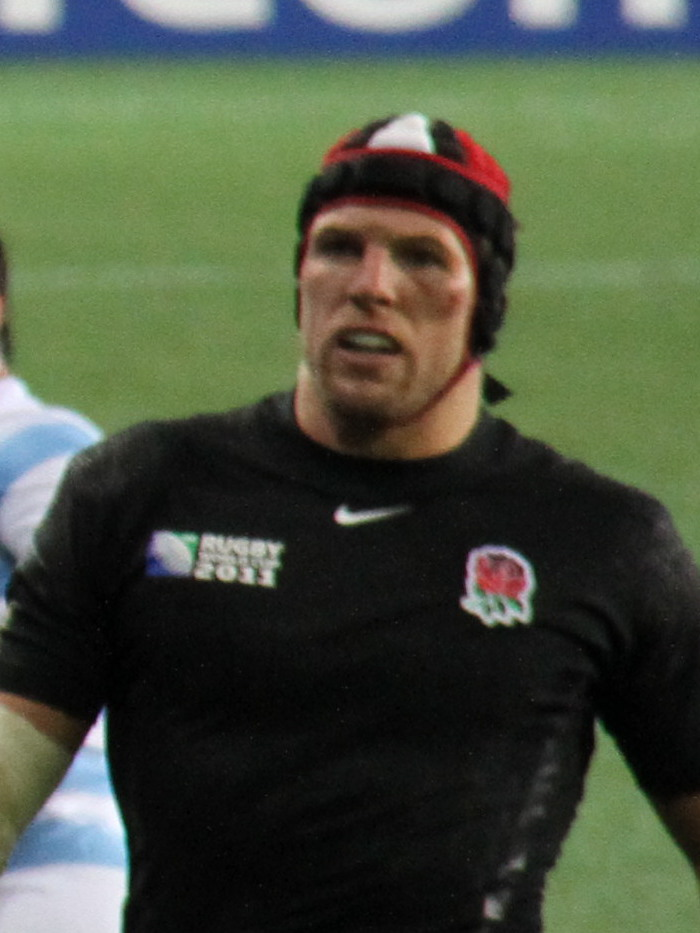
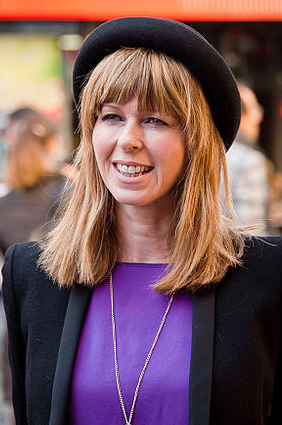
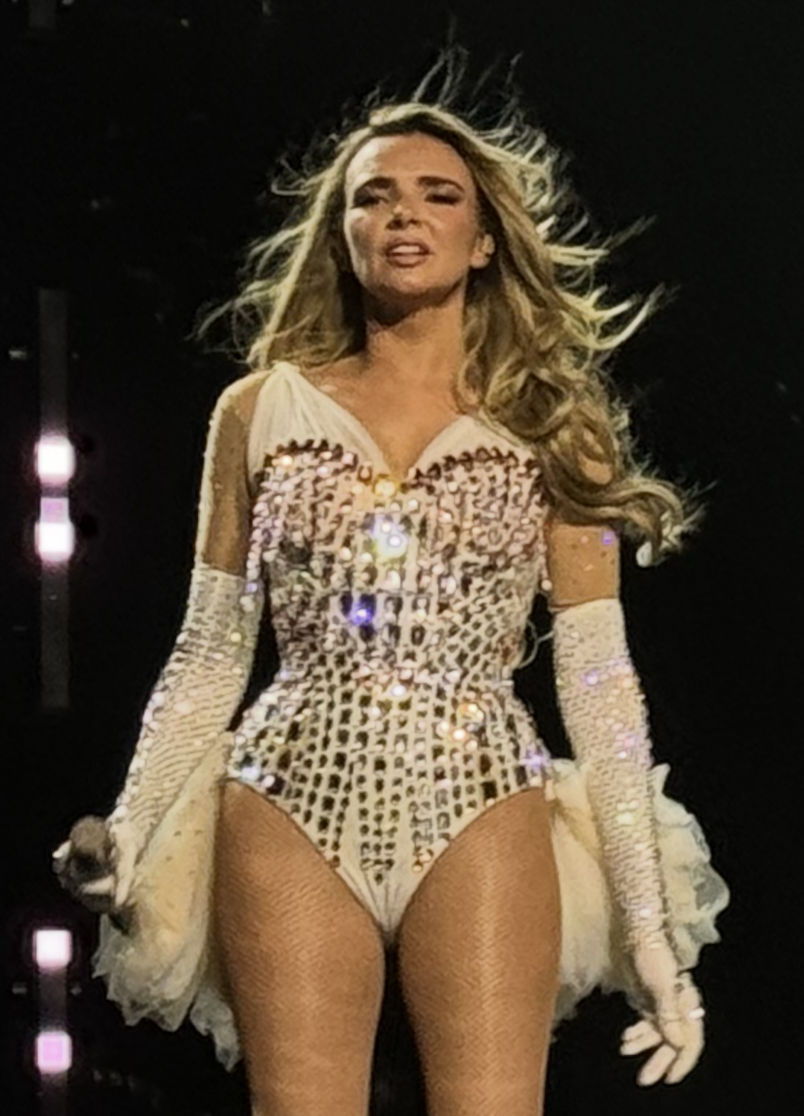
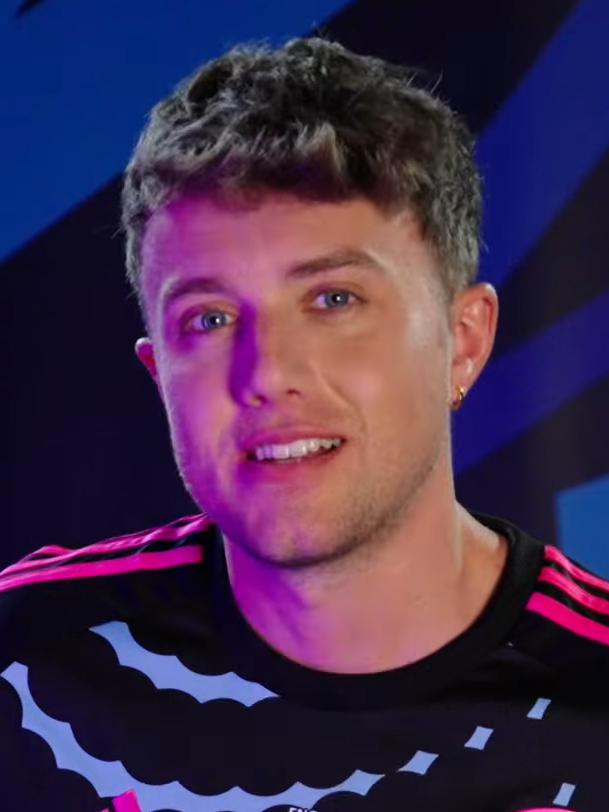
From left to right: Andrew Maxwell, Caitlyn Jenner, Ian Wright, Jacqueline Jossa, James Haskell, Kate Garraway, Nadine Coyle, and Roman Kemp.
Not pictured: Adele Roberts, Andy Whyment, Cliff Parisi, and Myles Stephenson.

Celebrity	Known for	Status
Jacqueline Jossa	Former EastEnders actress	Winner on 8 December 2019
Andy Whyment	Coronation Street actor	Runner-up on 8 December 2019
Roman Kemp	Capital FM presenter	Third place on 8 December 2019
Kate Garraway	Television & radio presenter	Eliminated 9th on 7 December 2019
Nadine Coyle	Girls Aloud singer	Eliminated 8th on 6 December 2019
Caitlyn Jenner	Former Olympic decathlete & television personality	Eliminated 7th on 6 December 2019
Myles Stephenson	Rak-Su singer	Eliminated 6th on 5 December 2019
Ian Wright	Former England footballer & television presenter	Eliminated 5th on 4 December 2019
James Haskell	Former England rugby union player	Eliminated 4th on 3 December 2019
Cliff Parisi	Call the Midwife & former EastEnders actor	Eliminated 3rd on 2 December 2019
Andrew Maxwell	Stand-up comedian	Eliminated 2nd on 1 December 2019
Adele Roberts	BBC Radio 1 presenter & Big Brother 3 housemate	Eliminated 1st on 29 November 2019

== Results and elimination ==
Indicates that the celebrity was immune from the vote.
Indicates that the celebrity received the most votes from the public.
Indicates that the celebrity received the fewest votes and was eliminated immediately (no bottom two).
Indicates that the celebrity received the second fewest votes and was eliminated after being in the bottom two.
Indicates that the celebrity was named as being in the bottom two.
Indicates that the celebrity received the second fewest votes and was not named in the bottom two

Daily results per celebrity
Celebrity	Day 13	Day 15	Day 16	Day 17	Day 18	Day 19	Day 20	Day 21	Day 22		Trials	Dingo Dollar challenges
Celebrity	Day 13	Day 15	Day 16	Day 17	Day 18	Day 19	Day 20	Day 21	Round 1	Round 2	Trials	Dingo Dollar challenges
Jacqueline	Safe	Safe	Safe	Safe	Safe	Safe	Safe	Safe	1st 36.97%	Winner; 50.61%	10	4
Andy	Safe	Safe	Safe	Safe	Safe	Safe	Safe	Safe	2nd 33.89%	Runner-up; 49.39%	8	3
Roman	Safe	Safe	Safe	Safe	Safe	Safe	Safe	Safe	3rd 29.15%	Eliminated (Day 22)	10	2
Kate	Safe	Bottom two	Safe	Safe	Safe	Safe	Safe	4th	Eliminated (Day 21)		8	2
Nadine	Bottom two	Safe	Safe	Safe	Safe	Safe	5th	Eliminated (Day 20)			4	4
Caitlyn	Safe	Safe	Bottom two	Safe	Bottom two	Bottom two	6th	Eliminated (Day 20)			7	2
Myles	Immune	Safe	Safe	Safe	Safe	7th	Eliminated (Day 19)				6	2
Ian	Immune	Safe	Safe	Bottom two	8th	Eliminated (Day 18)					9	2
James	Immune	Safe	Safe	9th	Eliminated (Day 17)						7	2
Cliff	Safe	Safe	10th	Eliminated (Day 16)							5	1
Andrew	Safe	11th	Eliminated (Day 15)								6	1
Adele	9th	Eliminated (Day 13)									6	1
Notes	1, 2	None							3			
Bottom two (named in)	Adele, Nadine	Andrew, Kate	Caitlyn, Cliff	Ian, James	Caitlyn, Ian	Caitlyn, Myles	Caitlyn, Nadine	None				
Eliminated	Adele; Fewest votes to save	Andrew; Fewest votes to save	Cliff; Fewest votes to save	James; Fewest votes to save	Ian; Fewest votes to save	Myles; Fewest votes to save	Caitlyn; Fewest votes to save	Kate; Fewest votes to save	Roman; 29.15% to win	Andy; 49.39% to win		
Eliminated	Adele; Fewest votes to save	Andrew; Fewest votes to save	Cliff; Fewest votes to save	James; Fewest votes to save	Ian; Fewest votes to save	Myles; Fewest votes to save	Nadine; Fewest votes to save	Kate; Fewest votes to save	Roman; 29.15% to win	Jacqueline; 50.61% to win		

=== Notes ===
- ^Note 1: The celebrities competed in a series of challenges to become "uncursed" and earn immunity. Ian, James and Myles became immune by the end of the challenges.
- ^Note 2: All app votes were voided for this elimination, as a result of a wording error; only phone votes were counted.
- ^Note 3: The public voted for who they wanted to win, rather than save.

== Bushtucker trials ==
The contestants take part in daily trials to earn food. These trials aim to test both physical and mental abilities. The winner is usually determined by the number of stars collected during the trial, with each star representing a meal earned by the winning contestant for their camp friends.

The public voted for who they wanted to face the trial
The contestants decided who would face the trial
The trial was compulsory and neither the public nor celebrities decided who took part

Trial number	Air date	Name of trial	Celebrity participation	Number of stars/Winner	Notes
1	18 November	Bugged Off	Caitlyn; Kate	4/10 stars	1
2	19 November	Face Your Fears	Andrew; Caitlyn; Ian; Jacqueline; James	7/10 stars	1
3	20 November	Just Desserts	Adele; Roman	10/10 stars	—N/a
4	21 November	Ol' Dingo Town: The Frontier of Fear	Andy; Cliff	8/10 stars	—N/a
5	22 November	Ol' Dingo Town: Snake Hotel	Jacqueline	6/6 stars	2 3
5	22 November	Ol' Dingo Town: Snake Hotel	Myles	6/6 stars	2 3
6	23 November	Ol' Dingo Town: The Pest Office	Adele; Andrew; Andy; Caitlyn; Cliff; Ian; Jacqueline; James; Kate; Myles; Nadine; Roman	12/12 stars	—N/a
7	24 November	Crevice of Cruelty	Ian; Jacqueline	12/12 stars	4
8 (Live)	24 November	Jungle Love Island	Adele; Andrew; Caitlyn; Cliff; Ian; Jacqueline; James; Roman	9/12 stars	5
9	26 November	Ark of Agony	Andrew	10/12 stars	—N/a
10	27 November	Deadly Dungeon	Ian; James	6/12 stars	4
11	28 November	The Reckonings: The Sinister Circus	Ian; Jacqueline; Nadine; Roman	Nadine; Roman	4 6
12	28 November	The Reckonings: The Bad Banquet	Andrew; Andy; Caitlyn; Kate	Andrew; Andy	6
13	28 November	The Reckonings: Dead Ringers	Adele; Cliff; James; Myles	Adele; Myles	6
14	29 November	The Reckonings: The Sickening Cinema	Adele; Andrew; Andy; Caitlyn; Ian; Jacqueline; James; Kate; Myles; Nadine; Roman	Adele; Ian; James; Kate; Myles; Roman	7 8
15	29 November	The Reckonings: Trouble Baths	Adele; Ian; James; Kate; Myles; Roman	Ian; James; Myles	9
16	30 November	Under Critter Construction	Cliff; Myles	8/11 stars	—N/a
17	1 December	Hellevator	Ian	7/11 stars	—N/a
18	2 December	Movile Home	Nadine	10/10 stars	—N/a
19	3 December	Celebrities Assemble	Andy; Jacqueline; Kate	9/9 stars	—N/a
20	4 December	Slop of The Pops	Caitlyn; Roman	8/8 stars	—N/a
21	5 December	Frightseers	Kate	5/7 stars	—N/a
22	6 December	Pump of Peril	Andy; Roman	5/7 stars	—N/a
23	7 December	Celebrity Cyclone	Andy; Jacqueline; Kate; Roman	4/4 stars	—N/a
24	8 December	Stake Out	Jacqueline	5/5 stars	—N/a
25	8 December	Bushtucker Bonanza	Andy	5/5 stars	—N/a
26	8 December	Panic Pit	Roman	5/5 stars	—N/a

=== Notes ===
- ^Note 1: Only campmates from Snake Rock were eligible for this trial, as a result of losing the entry challenge.
- ^Note 2: The chosen contestant (Jacqueline) had to pick one other person to do the trial with her.
- ^Note 3: Only campmates from main camp were eligible for this trial.
- ^Note 4: Cliff was ruled out on medical grounds.
- ^Note 5: Andy, Kate, Myles and Nadine were doing a separate, bigger trial in order to try and win care packages.
- ^Note 6: Celebrities are competing against each other. Only the two celebrities who complete the task quickest, will win a meal.
- ^Note 7: Celebrities were competing for both meals and immunity from the first public vote-off. The losing celebrities in this trial (Andrew, Andy, Caitlyn, Cliff, Jacqueline and Nadine) were automatically put up for the vote-off.
- ^Note 8: Cliff was unable to participate in this trial due to illness. James "participated" on his behalf to attempt to win immunity for him.
- ^Note 9: The celebrities who won the fourth reckonings trial took part in the next reckoning trial to decide who was immune from the first public vote, and was the final reckoning trial of the series.

== Star count ==
Celebrity	Number of stars earned	Percentage
Jacqueline Jossa	76/82 stars	93%
Andy Whyment	55/59 stars	93%
Roman Kemp	65/70 stars	93%
Kate Garraway	48/54 stars	89%
Nadine Coyle	34/34 stars	100%
Caitlyn Jenner	52/64 stars	81%
Myles Stephenson	48/51 stars	94%
Ian Wright	56/69 stars	81%
James Haskell	46/58 stars	79%
Cliff Parisi	49/57 stars	86%
Andrew Maxwell	50/58 stars	86%
Adele Roberts	43/46 stars	93%

== Dingo Dollar challenges ==
As well as 'Bushtucker Trials,' celebrities have to complete 'Dingo Dollar Challenges' in order to earn treats for the camp. At least 2 celebrities will be chosen (by camp) to compete in the challenge. These challenges often are mental challenges, rather than challenges including bugs. They must complete the challenge they have been given in order to win 'Dingo Dollars'. After completion of the challenge, the celebrities will take the Dingo Dollars and head to the Outback Shack, where they will purchase one of two snack options, from Kiosk Kev. But, before they are allowed to take the prize, the other celebrities in camp must answer a question, based on a recent survey. If they get the question right, they will earn the treat, but if they get it wrong, the celebrities will go back empty handed.

The celebrities got the question correct
The celebrities got the question wrong
No question was asked

Episode	Air date	Celebrities	Prizes available	Prize chosen	Notes
2	18 November	Andrew; Jacqueline	Crisps; Popcorn	Crisps	—N/a
4	20 November	Kate; Myles	Chocolate Eggs; Twiglets	Chocolate Eggs	—N/a
5	21 November	Ian; Nadine	Wagon Wheels (Main Camp); Wagon Wheels (Jailhouse)	Wagon Wheels (Main Camp)	13
6	22 November	Caitlyn; James	Andy; Cliff	Cliff	14
8	24 November	Kate; Roman	Jelly Beans; Salted Nuts	Jelly Beans	—N/a
10	26 November	Adele; Cliff	After Eights; Wotsits	After Eights	—N/a
11	27 November	Andy; Nadine	Flying Saucers; Crumpets with Butter	Crumpets with Butter	—N/a
14	30 November	Jacqueline; Roman	Lemonade; Ice Pops	Ice Pops	—N/a
16	2 December	Andy; Caitlyn	Scones, Jam and Cream; Cheese and Crackers	Scones, Jam and Cream	—N/a
17	3 December	Ian; James	Chocolate Coins; Mince Pies	Chocolate Coins	—N/a
18	4 December	Myles; Nadine	Chocolate Covered Strawberries; Sausage Rolls	Chocolate Covered Strawberries	—N/a
19	5 December	Andy; Jacqueline	Tea, Milk and Sugar; Variety of Biscuits	Variety of Biscuits	—N/a
20	6 December	Jacqueline; Nadine	Chocolate Eclairs; Chocolate Cupcakes	Chocolate Cupcakes	—N/a

- ^Note 13: Ian and Nadine were given the option to either; win the wagon wheels for the main camp, or the jailhouse. They chose to keep them for themselves and the main camp.
- ^Note 14: Instead of the usual prizes, Caitlyn and James were given the option to either; free Andy or Cliff from the jailhouse and move to the main camp. They chose Cliff. They also didn't have to answer a question in order to free Cliff as he was released automatically.

== Ratings ==
Official ratings are taken from BARB, utilising the four-screen dashboard which includes viewers who watched the programme on laptops, smartphones, and tablets within 7 days of the original broadcast.

Episode	Air date	Official rating (millions incl. HD & +1)	Rank
1	17 November	13.18	1
2	18 November	12.15	1
3	19 November	11.81	2
4	20 November	11.44	4
5	21 November	11.40	5
6	22 November	10.81	7
7	23 November	10.52	9
8	24 November	11.63	3
9	25 November	11.07	1
10	26 November	10.51	4
11	27 November	10.33	6
12	28 November	10.23	7
13	29 November	9.96	8
14	30 November	9.91	9
15	1 December	10.50	5
16	2 December	10.12	4
17	3 December	10.00	5
18	4 December	8.98	8
19	5 December	9.25	7
20	6 December	8.84	9
21	7 December	9.51	6
22	8 December	10.84	2
Series average	2019	10.59	—N/a
Coming Out	12 December	6.86	6
