= Siân Welby =

English television and radio presenter (born 1986)

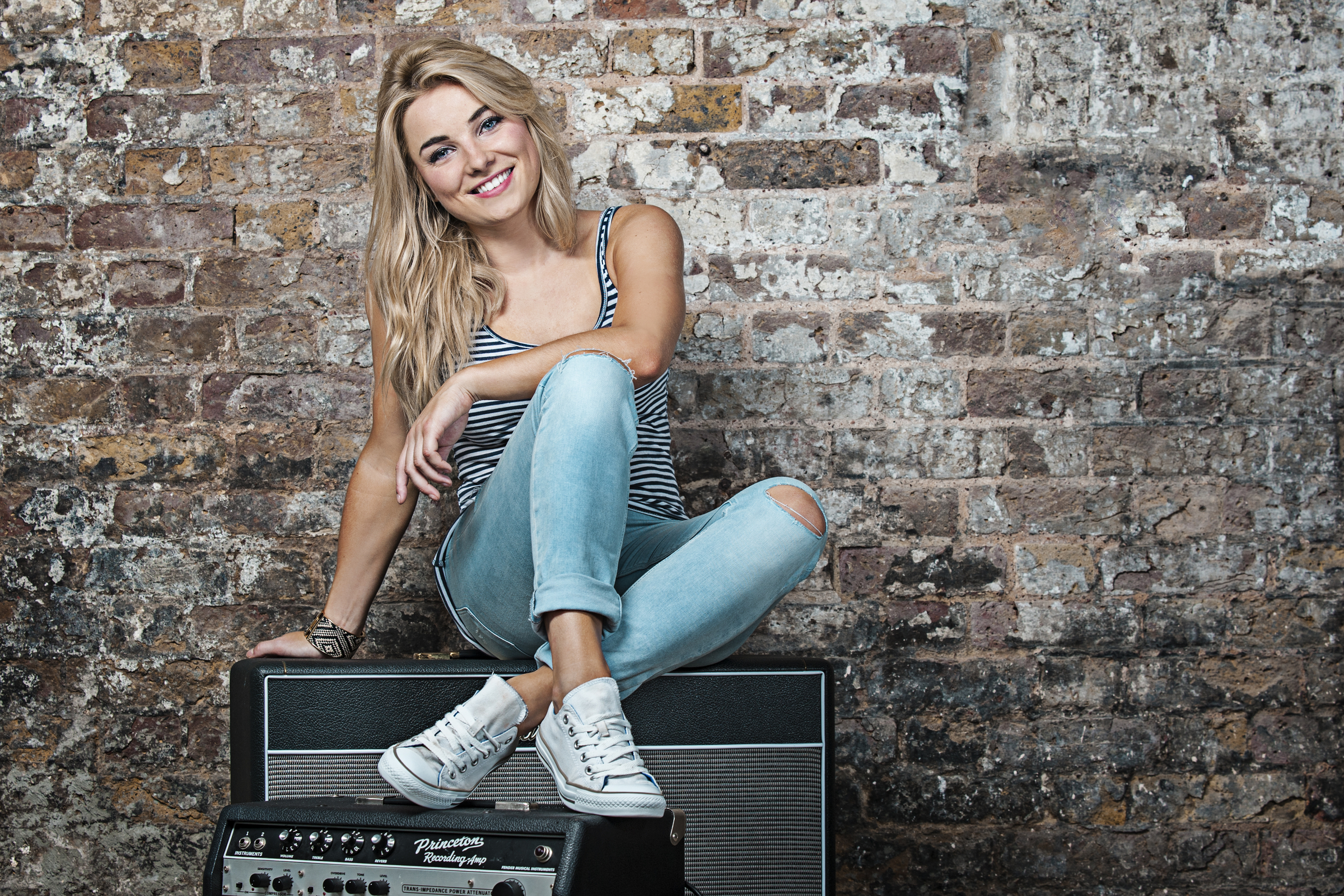
- Welby in 2014
- Born: 3 September 1986 (age 40); Nottingham, England
- Occupations: TV presenter; columnist; radio presenter
- Years active: 2008–present
- Employer(s): Heart (former); The Official Big Top 40 (former); Channel 4 (current); Channel 5 (current); Eurosport (current); ITV (current); Sky Sports (former); MTV (former); EA Games (former); Capital (current)
- Known for: Radio and television presenter
- Notable work: This Morning, Capital Breakfast
- Television: Presenting; 5 News (2010–); The Health Lottery (2011–); Cycling: Revolution Series (2012–); This Morning (2023–)
- Height: 5 ft 4 in (1.63 m)
- Partner: Jake Beckett
- Children: 1

Siân Welby (born 3 September 1986) is an English television presenter and radio host, best known for her work with Channel 5, BBC, ITV and Channel 4. Welby used to host her own national radio show on Heart every Monday to Thursday from 7–10 pm. Welby now fronts Capital Breakfast with Jordan North and Chris Stark.

== Early life ==
Welby was born in Nottingham and grew up in Upton, a small village in Nottinghamshire, England. She attended Minster School, Southwell. She began presenting at 19, and she was still working part-time as a shop assistant for New Look when a starring role in an advert for New! magazine led to her being spotted by former Channel 5 owner Richard Desmond in October 2010. She was unveiled as the new face of Channel 5 News in November 2010. She has described how she would work as a retail assistant by day, and record online videos in the fitting room after the shop had closed.

== Career ==
=== Television ===
She presents Formula E's global TV show, Street Racers, on Channel 5. Welby hosted the Revolution cycling show series for Channel 4, alongside co-worker from 5 News, newscaster Matt Barbet. She presented her first documentary, Sarah Storey’s Longest Hour on Channel 4. Previously she has presented cycling shows for BT Sport, Eurosport and ITV4 and is the female face of Electronic Arts.

From 2010 to 2016, she was the lead weather presenter on Channel 5. In 2016, she was shortlisted by the Radio Times in a poll to be named Great Britain's greatest ever weather presenter.

In September 2018, Welby was announced as the face of Barbour's new Autumn/Winter 'Weather Comfort Collection'.

Welby became a presenter for the online quiz game, HQ Trivia in the UK, making her first appearance on Monday 9 July 2018.

In February 2019, Welby became the presenter for another online quiz game called Heart's Triple Play, broadcast exclusively on Facebook Watch. Heart's Triple Play is run by the British radio network, Heart, and was scheduled to run for 10 weeks.

On 9 October 2021, Welby appeared on CBBC show Saturday Mash-Up! alongside Capital Radio co-star Sonny Jay. Having received a record 79% of the viewer vote, Welby took part in Slime and Punishment, and was covered in 20 buckets of multi-coloured gunge.

On 22 January 2024, Welby made her debut as a co-presenter on ITV1 magazine show, This Morning and remains a regular contributer as of 2026.

=== Radio ===
Since January 2017, Welby has hosted her own national radio show on Heart every Monday to Thursday from 7 pm to 10 pm. In July 2018, she took over the Sunday morning breakfast show from Stephen Mulhern and Emma Willis. In 2017, she teamed up with Ed Sheeran to record a kazoo cover of his hit "Shape of You" live on air. She has a personalised a written thank you note from Sheeran framed in her house. On 20 March 2020, it was announced that Welby would join Capital Breakfast with Roman Kemp and co-hosted by Sonny Jay as a replacement for Vick Hope who left on 21 February 2020. In 2019 she covered The Sky VIP Official Big Top 40 on Capital and Heart. On 26 March 2021, Welby beat the Guinness World Record for the most sounds recognised in a minute. Welby will remain with Capital Breakfast following Kemp and Jay's departure and replaced by Jordan North and Chris Stark in April 2024.

Year	Title	Role
2017–2020	Siân Welby on Heart	Presenter
2018–2020	Sunday Mornings with Siân Welby	Presenter
2019	The Sky VIP Official Big Top 40	Cover Presenter
2020–present	Capital Breakfast	Presenter/Host

=== Streaming ===
In 2018 Welby became one of the presenters at HQ Trivia. She hosted episodes of the UK show from mid-2018 until the show's conclusion in late 2018.

== Social media ==
Her forecasts have attracted over 30 million views online, and have been featured by Time, The New York Times and MTV. In 2016, Welby was challenged to a pun battle with Greg James live on BBC Radio 1.

Welby is the face of BBC One social channels. She launched the award-winning Snapchat account and has presented live from events such as the BAFTAs, Sports Personality of the Year, BRIT Awards and BBC Music Awards. In 2017 she won a Digiday Publishing Award for Best Use of Snapchat for her work on the BBC One campaign.

== Personal life ==
Growing up, she looked up to childrens TV presenter Cat Deeley. She stated "Cat was a bit of an idol. Mainly because she wasn't afraid to laugh at herself and be silly." Welby's favourite TV show is Curb Your Enthusiasm, and she states that comedy drives a lot of her work, stating in an interview that "no matter what kind of show I am working on, or what kind of day I might be having, my goal is always the same – find the funny in everything."

On 28 February 2024, Welby announced she is expecting her first child with fiancée Jake Beckett. She announced this news live on air on Capital Breakfast. On 29 June 2024, it was announced she gave birth to a girl. She lives in Wandsworth, southwest London.

== Charity work ==
Welby is an active supporter of several charities including the Sick Children's Trust and Leonard Cheshire Disability Centre. She told The Daily Express that "The Sick Children’s Trust is a wonderful charity. My older sister sadly died from meningitis before I was born, so it's a cause that’s close to my heart". Since 2013, she has been the face of the NHS Keep Well, Keep Warm campaign, aimed at keeping vulnerable members of society warm during the cold winter months. In 2016, she was recognised for her creativity and commitment to charity work in London by the Mayor of Wandsworth, Nicola Nardelli.
