= Sonny Jay =

English radio presenter (born 1993)

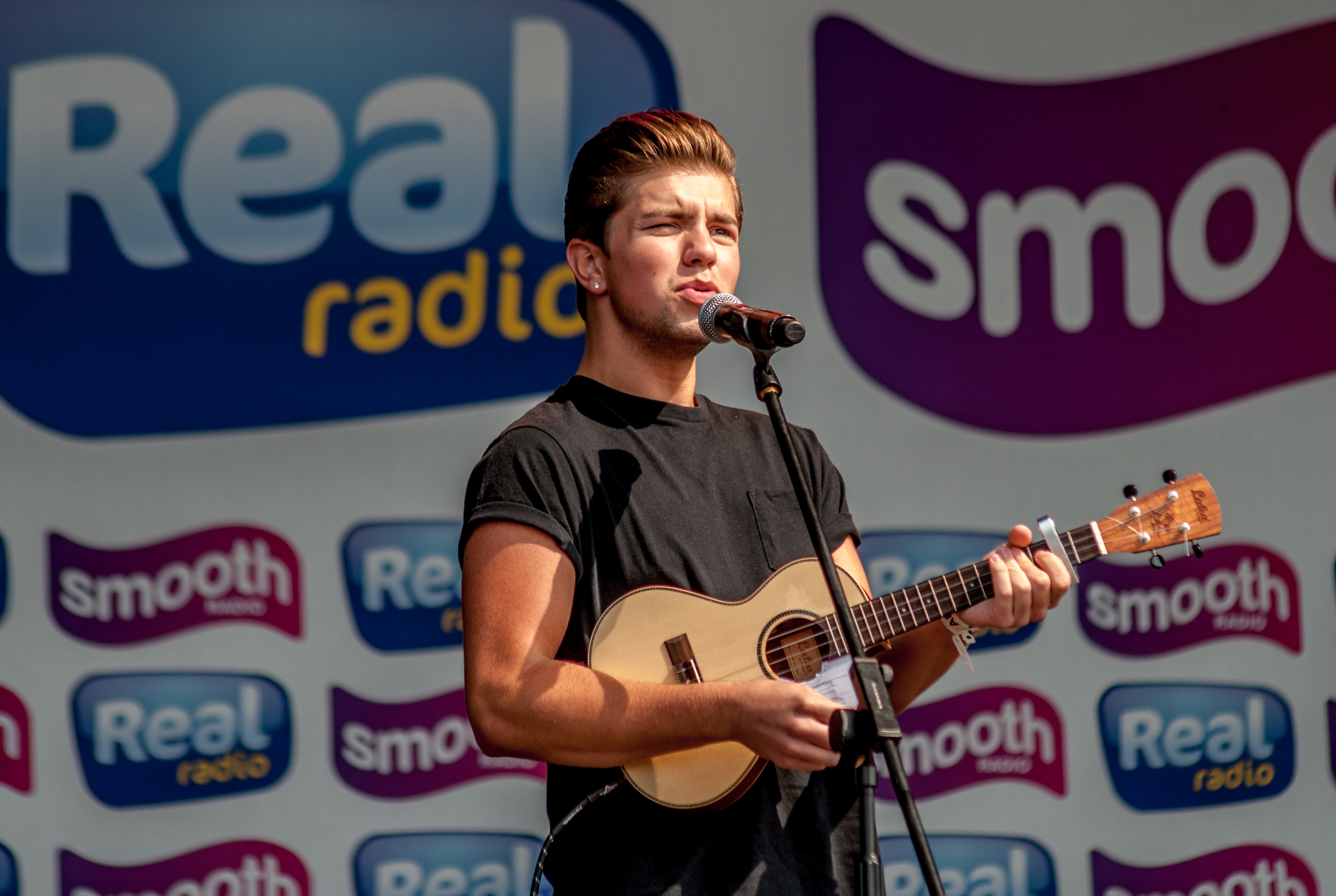
- Muharrem performing at Liverpool International Music Festival in 2013
- Born: Sonny Jay Muharrem; 30 June 1993 (age 32); Redbridge, London, England
- Occupations: Radio presenter; singer
- Years active: 2012–present
- Employer: Capital FM
- Children: 1
- Parent: Corrine Muharrem (Mother)
- Musical career
- Genres: Pop
- Instruments: Vocals; guitar
- Labels: Syco Music

Sonny Jay Muharrem (born 30 June 1993) is an English radio presenter and singer. As a member of the boy band Loveable Rogues, he was a finalist on Britain's Got Talent in 2012 before beginning a career in radio presenting. From 2018 to 2022, he co-presented on Capital Breakfast. In 2021, he won the thirteenth series of Dancing on Ice. Since 2023, he has presented The Capital Late Show.

== Career ==
As a musician he was known for being a member of the group Loveable Rogues who reached the finals of the sixth series of Britain's Got Talent in 2012, and subsequently signed a record deal with Simon Cowell's record company Syco Music. As a radio presenter he presented Phoenix FM from 2015 to 2017 before moving to Capital FM in 2018. He co-presented Capital Breakfast alongside Roman Kemp and Vick Hope (later Sian Welby), until he announced his departure in December 2022, when he announced he would be leaving to take over Marvin Humes' slot on The Capital Late Show every Monday to Thursday, he started in January 2023.

In 2021, he won the thirteenth series of Dancing on Ice partnered with Angela Egan. He was also a contestant on The Chase: Celebrity Special in December 2021. In 2022, he appeared on Celebrity Mastermind.

== Personal life ==
Muharrem became engaged to his girlfriend Lauren Faith in August 2020. They later separated in 2022, stating that they wanted to focus on their careers. Muharrem is in a relationship with Danielle Peazer and in January 2024, they announced that Peazer was pregnant with the couple's first child and was later born on May 8, 2024. It was later revealed as a girl and they named her Mia Muharrem.
