= Chris Stark =

British radio personality (born 1987)

- Born: Christopher Francis Stark; 12 March 1987 (age 39); Watford, England
- Education: University of Southampton
- Occupations: Radio and TV presenter, DJ, author, entrepreneur
- Employers: BBC (former); Global (current)
- Known for: Scott Mills (radio show); Virtually Famous; That Peter Crouch Podcast; Capital Breakfast
- Spouse: Ria Holland (m. 2018)
- Children: 2

Christopher Francis Stark (born 12 March 1987) is a British radio DJ and television personality. He is the co-host of Capital Breakfast alongside Jordan North and Sian Welby. He is one of the hosts of the award winning That Peter Crouch Podcast. He was also a co-host on the Scott Mills show on BBC Radio 1 until he departed in 2022.

== Broadcasting career ==
=== Capital FM ===
In July 2022 it was announced that Stark would be joining Capital Breakfast with Roman Kemp and Sian Welby and he began his presenting role on 10 October 2022. He now co-hosts the show with Jordan North and Sian Welby.

=== That Peter Crouch Podcast ===
In 2018, along with Peter Crouch and Tom Fordyce, Stark became a co-host of That Peter Crouch Podcast.. This has become a success with over five series being created. The podcast returned in 2022 where it moved from the BBC to Acast. Chris and Peter are now joined by co-host Steve Sidwell.

=== Radio 1 ===
Stark officially joined the Scott Mills show on 2 April 2012, but occasionally appeared on the show as 'Scott's friend Chris' for a period of time prior to this. Stark participated in most of the show's ongoing features including Real or No Real, Innuendo Bingo, 24 Years at the Tap End, Bamboleo Wednesday.

On 1 July 2022, it was announced that Mills and Stark would both be leaving Radio 1 after respectively 24 years and 10 years on air. Mills left to replace Steve Wright in the afternoon on BBC Radio 2, which he hosted on that station for more than 20 years, and Stark left to join Capital Breakfast. The move also confirmed the duo's departure from BBC Radio 5 Live after nearly three years. Their last shows on Radio 1 and 5 Live were broadcast in August 2022.

==== 24 Years at the Tap End ====
Stark is known for the feature 24 Years at the Tap End, in which he reads excerpts from his "autobography" (a deliberately humorous colloquial mispronunciation of "autobiography"). He was originally inspired to write his own autobiography after reading the autobiography of Brendan Sheerin from Coach Trip. The title refers to his on-air realisation, at age 24, that he had been sitting at the "wrong" end of the bath his whole life. The first episode aired on 11 November 2011. In this episode, Stark revealed that his parents had originally planned to name him "Padraig". Throughout the series, Stark recounts memorable events from his "years at the tap end" which often include mistakes made and life lessons learned through adventures with his friends. The second series of the show concluded in 2013, with no plans for a third. However, a one-off special aired in January 2014 as part of a comedy night on Radio One. This late night edition, Tap End: Unplugged, aired live In front of a studio audience and featured a live rendition of the theme tune. The late airing allowed Stark to reveal the full story of a holiday to Prague he had discussed in a previous episode, telling parts which were considered "too rude for daytime" and using strong language. These were repeated during 2020.

==== Mila Kunis interview ====
In March 2013, Stark was sent with ten minutes' notice to a media junket for the film Oz the Great and Powerful to interview American actress Mila Kunis for the Scott Mills Show. The interview caught the attention of the world's media, as the only thing Stark asked Kunis about the film was, "In the nicest possible way, did you enjoy being ugly for once?", referring the fact that Kunis' character Theodora becomes the Wicked Witch of the West. He then went on to discuss his local pub, local football club (Watford FC), Nando's and drinking games with his friends (inviting Kunis to all four). Eventually a person came out and told them that they need to do the interview, and Kunis quickly answered all the questions that other people had asked her and that Stark would have asked her about the film. Stark then invited Kunis to his friend's wedding. The video was posted to YouTube by BBC Radio 1 and subsequently went viral. Within days, it had been viewed by ten million people and Stark himself was interviewed by American entertainment and news shows such as Access Hollywood and CNN's Starting Point with Soledad O'Brien.

=== Television ===
In November 2013, Channel 4 announced they had commissioned an hour long, one-off documentary special which would feature Stark attempting to interview his ultimate bucket list of celebrities, including Derek Acorah, Rachel Stevens, Emma Thompson, Colin Farrell, Ricky Hatton and Verne Troyer. This aired on 10 February 2014.

From 2014 until 2016, Stark was a team captain on the E4 show, Virtually Famous. In 2015, Stark appeared as a guest on the CBBC panel show The Dog Ate My Homework. In December 2016, he took part in an episode of Celebrity Mastermind and a celebrity edition of Robot Wars.

In 2017, Stark appeared a guest on the CBBC Saturday morning show Saturday Mash-Up!. In the episode of Saturday Mash-Up, it was revealed that Stark was actually a contestant in the seventh series of BBC children's game show Get Your Own Back, who lost to fellow contestant Nazia, but presenter Yasmin surprised Stark, by bringing back Andy the Barber and returning the favour by gunging him.

== Personal life ==
=== Relationships and children ===
Stark is married to Ria Holland, and they have two children.

=== Health ===
In March 2025, Stark announced he had been diagnosed with testicular cancer, and had been undergoing chemotherapy treatment. He posted his announcement online, which included, "I had surgery pretty quickly and have been off the radio/ podcasts the last couple of weeks having chemotherapy to best prevent anything from coming back. The reason I want to share this is that I feel like an idiot that I didn’t spot this sooner. And although I’m effectively cured and it was caught early, my hope is any bloke reading this will perhaps think to check themselves today. Or go to a doctor if not sure about any possible symptoms."

=== Interests ===
Stark is a supporter of local football team Watford F.C.
