= Capital Breakfast =

UK radio program

Capital Breakfast with Jordan North, Chris Stark and Siân Welby
- Genre: Entertainment
- Running time: 240 minutes
- Country of origin: United Kingdom
- Language: English
- Home station: Capital
- TV adaptations: Freesat: 719; Freeview: 724; Sky: 0109; TalkTalk TV: 610; Virgin Media: 958
- Hosted by: Jordan North, Siân Welby and Chris Stark: Will Manning (cover)
- Created by: Global
- Produced by: James Thomson-Boston, Jake Hunter, Bella Farlow and Tom Cross
- Executive producer: Calum Hider
- Recording studio: Leicester Square, London
- Original release: 1973 – present
- Audio format: FM, digital radio and TV
- Website: Capital Breakfast

Capital Breakfast with Jordan North, Chris Stark and Siân Welby is a British national breakfast radio show on Capital. The show is broadcast from 6am to 10am each weekday.

A national version of the programme began on 8 April 2019 forcing the local variations across the UK to be axed. Those local versions were Dino, Pete & Tyles (Capital East Midlands), Jono & Emma (Capital South Coast), Adam & JoJo (Capital Yorkshire), Rob & Matilda (Capital Birmingham), Matt & Polly (Capital South Wales), Bodg, Matt & Hannah (Capital North East), The Rob Ellis Show (Capital Manchester), Des Clarke, Ben Sheppard (Capital North West and Wales), Adam, Gemma & Dylan (Capital Liverpool), Dave and Miranda (Capital Brighton) and Alistair James (Capital Cymru). Only Capital Scotland as of April 2023, has retained its own local show.

== Broadcast and production ==
As Capital London (channel listed as Capital FM) is simulcast on TV variants which are available on Freesat, Freeview, Sky, TalkTalk TV and Virgin Media, Capital Breakfast is available throughout the UK. This variant is produced at their studios in Leicester Square, London.

== On air team ==
The longest running presenter was Chris Tarrant, who presented the show from 1987 to 2004. Tarrant won the Sony Radio Academy Awards, Breakfast Show Gold in 1995 for this show. Previous Breakfast Show presenters from 1973 were David Symonds, Kenny Everett & Dave Cash, Everett on his own, Mike Smith and Graham Dene.

In April 2004, Johnny Vaughan replaced Tarrant, as the presenter of Capital Breakfast. In 2008, he was joined by Denise van Outen and then Lisa Snowdon. Vaughan left the programme in November 2011 after being told that his contract was not being renewed, and was replaced with Dave Berry.

In February 2011 it was reported the show remained London's most listened to commercial breakfast show with Capital London having more than one million listeners between 6 am and 10 am.

In February 2016, following Lisa Snowdon's departure, It was announced that George Shelley and Lilah Parsons would join Dave Berry as co-presenters.

In February 2017, It was announced that Dave Berry to leave Capital to host his own show on Absolute Radio.

In April 2017, Dave Berry left Capital. Following that it was announced that George Shelley and Lilah Parsons would leave Capital Breakfast, a Capital spokesperson said they’ll appear elsewhere on the schedule.

On 18 April 2017, it was announced that Roman Kemp would host the show alongside Vick Hope, a new presenter. They started on 2 May 2017. A year later Sonny Jay joined the show full-time. On 24 February 2020, it was announced that Hope had left Capital Breakfast to focus on new TV opportunities.

It was announced that presenter Siân Welby would replace Hope, starting 23 March 2020.

In December 2022, Sonny Jay left Capital Breakfast due to the departure of Marvin Humes from The Capital Late Show in which he later took over as host in January 2023.

On 20 November 2023, Capital changed the show name from Capital Breakfast with Roman Kemp to Capital Breakfast with Roman Kemp, Chris Stark and Siân Welby.

On 19 February 2024, Roman Kemp announced that he would be leaving Capital Breakfast as main host after 7 years, stating that he only has six weeks until he presented his final show on 28 March 2024. Capital advised that they would announce the new host of Capital Breakfast later in February as confirmed by Will Manning on his drivetime show, with reports suggesting that Jordan North would take on the role. This was confirmed on 21 February 2024 when Capital announced that North would be taking over from Kemp, starting on 8 April 2024.

On 4 June 2024, Siân Welby confirmed live on the breakfast show that she would present her last show on 7 June 2024 where she will leave the show to have her baby over the summer. It was confirmed at the same time that Kemi Rodgers would step in and hold the fort. Rodgers will still present her Saturday morning weekend breakfast show, with Ant Payne & Lydia Rodford covering her Sunday slot & Lydia Rodford covering her overnight shows Mon - Wed. On 14th August 2024, Welby joined North, Stark & Rodgers on FaceTime to confirm her return to the breakfast show on 2 September 2024, and Rodgers announced that her final show on the breakfast show would be 16 August 2024 with Jordan & Chris promising to give her the send off. It was also announced that following Rodgers leaving the show for Welby to return, she would take on a brand new show on Capital mid mornings, following the confirmation that Rio Fredrika would leave the station after 6 years.

=== Presenters ===
- Jordan North (2024–present)
- Siân Welby (2020–present)
- Chris Stark (2022–present)

=== Main presenters ===
- Kenny Everett (1973–1975) (deceased)
- Graham Dene (1975–1980, 1982–1987)
- Mike Smith (1980–1982) (deceased)
- Chris Tarrant (1987–2004)
- Neil Fox = deputised for Chris Tarrant (1988–2003)
- Johnny Vaughan (2004–2011)
- Rich Clarke (stand-in presenter, 2009–2012)
- Dave Berry (2012–2017)
- Lilah Parsons (2016–2017)
- George Shelley (2016–2017)
- Roman Kemp (2017–2024)
- Vick Hope (2017–2020)
- Sonny Jay (2018–2022)
- Kemi Rodgers (2024) - 3 Months maternity cover for Siân Welby.

==== Co-presenters ====
- Caroline Feraday co-presenter with Neil Fox when deputising for Chris Tarrant (1995–2001)
- Becky Jago (2003–2004)
- Denise van Outen (2008)
- Lisa Snowdon (2009–2015). Replacing Denise Van Outen. Left 18 December 2015.
- Paddy Bunce (Sports reporter when Johnny Vaughan presented the programme)
- Dominic Byrne (newsreader, 2013–2014)
