= Television and Radio Industries Club =

UK industry association

The Television and Radio Industries Club (widely known as TRIC) is a British institution chartered in 1931 to "promote goodwill in the television and radio industries". The Club holds an annual awards ceremony each year honouring achievement in television and radio.

Membership is drawn from the communication, entertainment, manufacturing, warranty insurance and service sectors from programme makers and broadcasters to radio producers and makers.

== TRIC president ==
The TRIC presidency is an honorary position that usually has a fixed term of one year. For the first few decades of its existence, TRIC presidents were drawn mainly from TV/Radio industry pioneers or the world of politics. The 1970s heralded a shift and marked a period which saw the appointment of numerous broadcast industry executives. The 1990s saw another shift with appointments from the world of popular entertainment. Notable holders have included Robert Maxwell, Michael Grade, Bob Monkhouse, Bernard Ingham and Tony Hadley

=== 1980–present day ===
2020s		2010s		2000s		1990s		1980s	
2029/30		2019/20	Lorraine Kelly	2009/10	Sian Williams	1999/00	Gloria Hunniford	1989/90	Clive Leach
2028/29		2018/19	Lisa Snowdon	2008/09	Sian Williams	1998/99	Bruce Gyngell	1988/89	John F. O'Neill
2027/28		2017/18	Lisa Snowdon	2007/08	Brian Blessed	1997/98	Bernard Ingham	1987/88	Michael Grade
2026/27		2016/17	Jeff Stelling	2006/07	Dermot Murnaghan	1996/97	Ned Sherrin	1986/87	Robert Maxwell
2025/26		2015/16	Kate Garraway	2005/06	Ainsley Harriott	1995/96	Will Wyatt	1985/86	John Whitney
2024/25	Dan Walker	2014/15	Sandi Toksvig	2004/05	June Whitfield	1994/95	Bob Monkhouse	1984/85	Aubrey Singer
2023/24	Roman Kemp	2013/14	Mary Nightingale	2003/04	Charlie Dimmock	1993/94	David Frost	1983/84	Lord Thompson
2022/23	Rob Rinder	2012/13	Jon Culshaw	2002/03	Angela Rippon	1992/93	Johnny Beerling	1982/83	David Hurley
2021/22	Alex Jones	2011/12	Eamonn Holmes	2001/02	Tom O'Connor	1991/92	Ian Gray	1981/82	Bill Cotton
2020/21	John Barrowman	2010/11	Tony Hadley	2000/01	Roy Hudd	1990/91	David Hatch	1980/81	Robin Scott

=== 1940–1979 ===
1970s		1960s		1950s		1940s	
1979/80	Brian Tesler	1969/70	Lord Hill	1959/60	D. Curry, A.M.I.E.R.E.	1949/50	The Marquis of Exeter
1978/79	Howard Thomas	1968/69	Lord Hill	1958/59	Robert Fraser	1948/49	H. de A. Donisthorpe
1977/78	Douglas Muggeridge	1967/68	Victor Tait	1957/58	Admiral J. W. S. Dorling	1947/48	J. H. Williams
1976/77	?	1966/67	Eric Robinson	1956/57	Eric K. Cole	1946/47	Leslie Carr Gamage
1975/76	Brian T. Reilly	1965/66	J. Raymond Tobin	1955/56	Harold Bishop	1945/46	Lord Renwick
1974/75	Lord Aylestone	1964/65	Ian Orr-Ewing	1954/55	Charles Orr Stanley	1944/45	Noel Ashbridge
1973/74	John Stewart-Clarke	1963/64	Basil de Ferranti	1953/54	Teddy Rosen	1943/44	Noel Ashbridge
1972/73	Peter Cadbury	1962/63	Guy Fountain	1952/53	Lord Brabazon	1942/43	Vincent de Ferranti
1971/72	George Elrick	1961/62	Ernest S. Brown	1951/52	Ian Fraser	1941/42	Louis Sterling
1970/71	Francis Edgar Jones	1960/61	F. W. Perks	1950/51	Norman Collins	1940/41	Stanley R. Mullard

=== 1930s ===
1939-40: The Right Honourable J. H. Thomas

1938-39: Major L. H. Peter (Chairman of the Radio Manufacturers Association and Chief engineer, Westinghouse Brake and Signal Company)

1937-38: M. M. Macqueen (Chairman of the Radio Manufacturers Association and later Chairman of General Electric Company)

== TRIC Awards ==
TRIC Awards
- Awarded for: Achievement in television and radio
- Date: Annually
- Location: The Great Room, Grosvenor House, London
- Country: United Kingdom
- Hosted by: Incumbent TRIC president
- First award: April 1969; 57 years ago
- Website: tric.org.uk/tric-awards/

The TRIC awards are bestowed annually and since 2019 the winners have been decided by public vote from a list of predetermined nominations within various categories.

Traditionally, the awards ceremony has taken place at the Grosvenor House Hotel, London, ever since the first Awards Lunch was held there in April 1969 when three awards were presented to Val Doonican, Kenneth Horne and The Forsyte Saga. In 2021, due to COVID-19 restrictions, the awards were presented in September instead of their usual March fixture and at 8 Northumberland Avenue near Trafalgar Square with an accompanying livestream.

Since 1992 it has been the honour of the TRIC president to host the awards ceremony, the only recent exceptions being the 2009 ceremony when Bill Turnbull stepped in on behalf of Sian Williams who was on maternity leave, and 2021 when Roman Kemp hosted in lieu of then president John Barrowman.

Award winners from the twentieth century have included sports presenter David Coleman, newscaster Jan Leeming and long-running radio drama, The Archers.

=== 2026 winners ===
56th TRIC awards: Hosted by Dan Walker
Award	Winners	Nominees
TRIC Special Award	Trevor Nelson	-
Content Creator	LadBaby	LadBaby; Mark Goldbridge; Mrs Hinch; Sidemen
Daytime Programme	A Place in the Sun	A Place in the Sun; Richard Osman's House of Games; Scam Interceptors; This Morning
Drama Programme	Adolescence	Adolescence; Call the Midwife; Death in Paradise; Slow Horses
Entertainment Programme	Clarkson's Farm	Clarkson's Farm; I'm a Celebrity Get Me Out of Here; Michael McIntyre's Big Show; Strictly Come Dancing
Factual Programme	24 Hours in Police Custody	24 Hours in Police Custody; Louis Theroux: The Settlers; The Martin Lewis Money Show Live; Who Do You Think You Are?
Food Programme	The Great British Bake Off	Come Dine With Me; James Martin's Saturday Morning; MasterChef; The Great British Bake Off
Game Show	The Celebrity Traitors	The 1% Club; The Celebrity Traitors; The Chase; Who Wants To Be A Millionaire?
Live Sport	Six Nations Rugby	Formula 1 PDC World Darts Championship; Six Nations Rugby; Wimbledon
News Programme	GB News Breakfast	BBC Breakfast; GB News Breakfast; Good Morning Britain; ITV Evening News
Podcast	Staying Relevant	The Celebrity Traitors: Uncloaked; Parenting Hell with Rob Beckett and Josh Widdicombe; Staying Relevant; That Peter Crouch Podcast
Radio Talk Show	Nick Ferrari	Nick Ferrari; TalkSPORT Breakfast; TalkSPORT Drive; Woman's Hour
Soap Actor	Jeff Hordley - Emmerdale	Gareth Pierce - Coronation Street; Sue Devaney - Coronation Street; Paul Bradley - EastEnders; Jeff Hordley - Emmerdale
Sports Presenter	Clare Balding	Alex Scott; Clare Balding; Gabby Logan; Laura Woods
Soap of the Year	Emmerdale	Casualty; Coronation Street; EastEnders; Emmerdale

=== 2025 winners ===
55th TRIC awards: Hosted by Dan Walker
Award	Winners	Nominees
TRIC Special Award 2025	Sir Trevor McDonald	-
Daytime Programme	A Place in the Sun	A Place in the Sun; Escape to the Country; Richard Osman’s House of Games; This Morning
Drama Programme	Call the Midwife	All Creatures Great and Small; Baby Reindeer; Bridgerton; Call the Midwife
Entertainment Programme	Clarkson's Farm	Clarkson's Farm; Gavin & Stacey; I'm a Celebrity...Get Me Out of Here! The Traitors
Factual Programme	24 Hours in Police Custody	24 Hours in Police Custody; Freddie Flintoff's Field of Dreams on Tour; The Martin Lewis Money Show; The Repair Shop
Food Programme	The Great British Bake Off	Great British Menu; James Martin's Saturday Morning; MasterChef; The Great British Bake Off
Game Show	1% Club	Ant & Dec's Limitless Win; Michael McIntyre's The Wheel; 1% Club; The Chase
Live Sport	Six Nations Rugby	2025 PDC World Darts Championships; Formula 1 British Grand Prix; Six Nations Rugby; Wimbledon
News Presenter	Charlie Peters	Fiona Bruce; Charlie Peters; Nigel Farage; Susanna Reid
News Programme	GB News Breakfast	BBC News at Six; GB News Breakfast; Good Morning Britain; ITV Evening News
Podcast	Staying Relevant	Begin Again with Davina McCall; Sh**ged. Married. Annoyed; Staying Relevant; That Peter Crouch Podcast
Radio Presenter	Jordan North	Ally McCoist; Jordan North; Simon Mayo; Vernon Kay
Radio Show	Heart Breakfast with Jamie Theakston and Amanda Holden	Capital Breakfast with Jordan North, Chris Stark & Sian Welby; Heart Breakfast with Jamie Theakston and Amanda Holden; Rylan on Saturday; White & Jordan
Soap Actor	Steve McFadden (as Phil Mitchell) EastEnders	Beth Cordingly (as Ruby Fox-Milligan) Emmerdale; Barney Walsh (as Cameron Mickelthwaite) Casualty; Steve McFadden (as Phil Mitchell) EastEnders; Jack P. Shepherd (as David Platt) Coronation Street
Soap of the Year	EastEnders	Casualty; Coronation Street; EastEnders; Emmerdale
Social Media Broadcaster	LadBaby	Eddie Hall (The Beast); LadBaby; Rob Beckett; Stacey Solomon
TV Personality	Bradley Walsh	Alison Hammond; Ant & Dec; Bradley Walsh; Martin Lewis

=== 2024 winners ===
55th TRIC awards: Hosted by Roman Kemp
Award	Winners	Nominees
TRIC Special Award 2024	Mr Bates vs The Post Office	-
TRIC Recognition Award (Note: The Special Recognition Award is not part of the main ceremony and is awarded in the lead up.)	Dave Berry	-
Soap of the Year	Coronation Street	Coronation Street; EastEnders; Emmerdale; The Archers
Soap Actor	Maureen Lipman (as Evelyn Plummer) Coronation Street	David Neilson (as Roy Cropper) Coronation Street; Derek Thompson (as Charlie Fairhead) Casualty; Jeff Hordley (as Cain Dingle) Emmerdale; Maureen Lipman (as Evelyn Plummer) Coronation Street
Entertainment Programme	Strictly Come Dancing	Gogglebox; I'm a Celebrity... Get Me Out of Here! Race Across the World; Strictly Come Dancing
Food Programme	Gordon Gino and Fred: Viva España	Gordon Gino and Fred: Viva España; The Great British Bake Off; MasterChef; Saturday Kitchen
Radio Programme	Ken Bruce	Capital Breakfast with Roman Kemp; Heart Breakfast with Jamie Theakston and Amanda Holden; Ken Bruce; The Zoe Ball Breakfast Show
Factual Programme	Mr Bates vs The Post Office – The Real Story	The Martin Lewis Money Show Live; Mr Bates vs The Post Office – The Real Story; Planet Earth III; The Repair Shop
Daytime Programme	Ken Bruce	A Place in the Sun; Escape to the Country; Homes Under the Hammer; Ken Bruce
Game Show	The Chase	1% Club; The Chase; Dragons' Den; The Traitors
Drama Programme	Mr Bates vs The Post Office	Death in Paradise; Happy Valley; Kin; Mr Bates vs The Post Office
News Programme	GB News Breakfast	BBC Breakfast; BBC News at Six; GB News Breakfast; Good Morning Britain
News Presenter	Nigel Farage	Eamonn Holmes; Matt Chorley; Nigel Farage; Susanna Reid
TV Personality	Bradley Walsh	Ant & Dec; Bradley Walsh; Martin Lewis; Piers Morgan
Radio Personality	Ken Bruce	Chris Moyles; Ken Bruce; Roman Kemp; Sara Cox
Podcast of the Year	That Peter Crouch Podcast	Staying Relevant: Sam Thompson & Pete Wicks; That Peter Crouch Podcast; The Diary of a CEO with Steven Bartlett; The Rest is History
Interview of the Year	Alastair Stewart reveals his heartbreaking diagnosis to Camilla Tominey	Alastair Stewart reveals his heartbreaking diagnosis to Camilla Tominey; Louis Theroux interviews Dame Joan Collins; Ken Bruce interviews Noel Gallagher; Piers Morgan Uncensored: "PM and the PM"
Live Event of the Year	The Coronation of HM The King and Queen Camilla	FIFA Women's World Cup Final; Glastonbury: Elton John's Farewell; The Coronation of HM The King and Queen Camilla; The Ashes Test Match Special – BBC Radio 5 Live
Social Media Broadcast	Joe Wicks	Amelia Dimoldenberg; Giovanna Fletcher; Joe Wicks; Sophie Hinchcliffe

=== 2023 winners ===
54th TRIC awards: Hosted by Rob Rinder and Judi Love
Award	Winners	Nominees
TRIC Special Award 2023	Good Morning Britain	-
TRIC Recognition Award (Note: The Special Recognition Award is not part of the main ceremony and is awarded in the lead up.)	James Whale	-
Soap of the Year	Emmerdale	Casualty; Coronation Street; EastEnders; Emmerdale
Soap Actor	Danielle Harold (as Lola Pearce-Brown) EastEnders	Charlotte Jordan (as Daisy Midgeley) Coronation Street; Danielle Harold (as Lola Pearce-Brown) EastEnders; Jeff Hordley (as Cain Dingle) Emmerdale; Ryan Prescott (as Ryan Connor) Coronation Street
Entertainment Programme	Gogglebox	Bradley Walsh & Son: Breaking Dad; Gogglebox; Have I Got News for You; I'm a Celebrity... Get Me Out of Here! Strictly Come Dancing
Food Programme	The Great British Bake Off	James Martin's Saturday Morning; MasterChef; Rick Stein's Cornwall; The Great British Bake Off
Radio Programme	The Julia Hartley-Brewer Breakfast Show	Capital Breakfast with Roman Kemp; James O'Brien; Kate Garraway; The Julia Hartley-Brewer Breakfast Show
Factual Programme	Paul O'Grady: For the Love of Dogs	Paul O'Grady: For the Love of Dogs; The Martin Lewis Money Show; The Queen: 70 Glorious Years; The Repair Shop
Daytime Programme	A Place in the Sun	A Place in the Sun; Escape to the Country; Father Brown; This Morning
Game Show	The Chase	Michael McIntyre's The Wheel; Pointless; The 1% Club; The Chase
Drama Programme	Peaky Blinders	Call the Midwife; Death in Paradise; Doc Martin; Peaky Blinders
Multi-Channel News	GB News Breakfast	Channel 4 News; GB News Breakfast; Good Morning Britain; ITV Evening News; Talk TV Breakfast Show
News Presenter	Nigel Farage	Eamonn Holmes; Nigel Farage; Piers Morgan; Stephen Dixon; Susanna Reid
TV Personality	Bradley Walsh	Ant & Dec; Bradley Walsh; Lee Mack; Michael McIntyre; Stacey Solomon
Radio Personality	Roman Kemp	James Whale; Kate Garraway; Roman Kemp; Sara Cox; Vanessa Feltz
Podcast of the Year	That Peter Crouch Podcast	Alan Carr's ‘Life's a Beach’ Dan Snow's History Hit; That Peter Crouch Podcast; Ukraine War Diaries
Interview of the Year	Piers Morgan interviews Cristiano Ronaldo	Louis Theroux interviews Stormzy; Michael Palin: Into Iraq; Piers Morgan interviews Cristiano Ronaldo; Susanna Reid interviews Boris Johnson
Live Event of the Year	The State Funeral of HM Queen Elizabeth II	Six Nations Rugby; The Queen's Platinum Jubilee; The State Funeral of HM Queen Elizabeth II; Wimbledon
Streamed	After Life	After Life; Bridgerton; House of the Dragon; The Crown; The White Lotus

=== 2022 winners ===
53rd TRIC awards: Hosted by Alex Jones
Award	Winners	Nominees
TRIC Special Award 2022	Clive Myrie	-
Soap of the Year	Emmerdale	Coronation Street; EastEnders; Emmerdale; Holby City
Soap Actor	Rosie Marcel (as Jac Naylor) Casualty / Holby City	Paige Sandhu (as Meena Jutla) Emmerdale; Rosie Marcel (as Jac Naylor) Casualty / Holby City; Sally Carman (as Abi Franklin) Coronation Street; Simon Gregson (as Steve McDonald) Coronation Street
Entertainment Programme	Gogglebox	Ant & Dec's Saturday Night Takeaway; Bradley Walsh & Son: Breaking Dad; Gogglebox; The Graham Norton Show
Reality Programme	Strictly Come Dancing	Clarkson's Farm; I'm a Celebrity... Get Me Out of Here! Strictly Come Dancing; The Masked Singer
Sports Programme	BBC Wimbledon	A League of their Own; BBC Wimbledon; Match of the Day; Tokyo 2020: Olympics (BBC)
Food Programme	Gordon, Gino and Fred Go Greek: "Mamma Mia"	Gordon, Gino and Fred Go Greek: "Mamma Mia"; James Martin's Saturday Morning; MasterChef; The Great British Bake Off
New Drama Programme	It's a Sin	Around the World in 80 Days; It's a Sin; The Pembrokeshire Murders; Vigil
Radio Programme	Capital Breakfast (Roman Kemp)	Capital Breakfast (Roman Kemp); Heart Breakfast (Jamie Theakston and Amanda Holden); Sara Cox (BBC Radio 2); The Zoe Ball Breakfast Show
Factual Programme	Paul O'Grady: For the Love of Dogs	Ambulance; Kate Garraway: Finding Derek; Paul O'Grady: For the Love of Dogs; The Repair Shop
Daytime Programme	This Morning	A Place in the Sun; Loose Women; Steph's Packed Lunch; This Morning
Game Show	The Chase	Michael McIntyre's The Wheel; Richard Osman's House of Games; The Chase; Would I Lie To You?
Drama Programme	Line of Duty	All Creatures Great and Small; Call the Midwife; Line of Duty; Vera
Multi-Channel News	Good Morning Britain	BBC Breakfast; BBC News Team; GB News Team; Good Morning Britain
News Presenter	Eamonn Holmes	Clive Myrie; Eamonn Holmes; Stephen Dixon; Victoria Derbyshire
TV Personality	Ant & Dec	Ant & Dec; Bradley Walsh; Piers Morgan; Rylan Clark
Radio Personality	Roman Kemp	Amanda Holden; Kate Garraway; Roman Kemp; Sara Cox
Podcast of the Year	Sh**ged, Married, Annoyed	Happy Place (Fearne Cotton); Parenting Hell (Rob Beckett and Josh Widdicombe); Sh**ged, Married, Annoyed; That Peter Crouch Podcast

=== 2021 winners ===
52nd TRIC awards: Hosted by Roman Kemp
Award	Winners	Nominees
TRIC Special Award 2021	Kate Garraway	-
Soap of the Year	Coronation Street	Casualty; Coronation Street; EastEnders; Emmerdale
Soap Actor	Shelley King (as Yasmeen Nazir) Coronation Street	Danny Dyer (as Mick Carter) EastEnders; Jane Danson (as Leanne Battersby) Coronation Street; Shelley King (as Yasmeen Nazir) Coronation Street
Entertainment Programme	Gogglebox	Ant & Dec's Saturday Night Takeaway; Bradley Walsh & Son: Breaking Dad; Gogglebox
Reality Programme	I'm a Celebrity...Get Me Out of Here!	I'm a Celebrity...Get Me Out of Here! The Masked Singer; Strictly Come Dancing
Sports Programme	A League of Their Own	A League of Their Own; Match of the Day; A Question of Sport
Food Programme	Gordon, Gino and Fred: American Road Trip	Gordon, Gino and Fred: American Road Trip; Saturday Morning with James Martin; The Great British Bake Off
New Drama Programme	Bridgerton	Bridgerton; Des; Gangs of London
Radio Programme	Capital Breakfast with Roman Kemp	Capital Breakfast (Roman Kemp); The Jason Manford Show; Mid Mornings (Kate Garraway)
Factual Programme	The Repair Shop	24 Hours in A&E; Ross Kemp: Living with Dementia; The Repair Shop
Daytime Programme	This Morning	Steph's Packed Lunch; The Chase; This Morning
Comedy Programme	Would I Lie to You?	After Life; Sex Education; Would I Lie to You?
Streamed (Drama) Programme	The Crown	Call the Midwife; Killing Eve; The Crown
Multi-Channel News	Good Morning Britain	BBC Breakfast; Good Morning Britain; Sky News
News Presenter	Piers Morgan	Huw Edwards; Piers Morgan; Susanna Reid
TV Personality	Ant & Dec	Alison Hammond; Ant & Dec; Bradley Walsh
Radio Personality	Roman Kemp	Roman Kemp; Tony Blackburn; Zoe Ball
Podcast of the Year	David Tennant does a Podcast with...	David Tennant does a Podcast with... Off Menu with Ed Gamble and James Acaster; Sh**ged Married Annoyed

=== 2020 winners ===
51st TRIC awards: Hosted by Lorraine Kelly
Award	Winners	Nominees
TRIC Special Award 2020	Newsnight	-
Soap of the Year	Coronation Street	Coronation Street; EastEnders; Emmerdale; Hollyoaks
Soap Actor	Kellie Bright (as Linda Carter) EastEnders	Kellie Bright (as Linda Carter) EastEnders; Jack P. Shepherd (as David Platt) Coronation Street; Jennifer Metcalfe (as Mercedes McQueen) Hollyoaks
Entertainment Programme	Gavin & Stacey	Gavin & Stacey; Fleabag; The Graham Norton Show
Reality Programme	Strictly Come Dancing	Strictly Come Dancing; I'm a Celebrity...Get Me Out of Here! Love Island
Sports Programme	A League of Their Own	A League of Their Own; Match of the Day; Rugby World Cup 2019 (ITV); Wimbledon 2019
Food Programme	The Great British Bake Off	The Great British Bake Off; Gino's Italian Express; MasterChef
Drama Programme	Killing Eve	Killing Eve; Chernobyl; Peaky Blinders
Radio Programme	Capital Breakfast (Roman Kemp)	Capital Breakfast (Roman Kemp); Radio 1 Breakfast (Greg James); BBC Radio 2 Drivetime (Sara Cox)
Factual Programme	Blue Planet Live	Blue Planet Live; 24 Hours in A&E; Seven Worlds, One Planet
Daytime Programme	This Morning	This Morning; Good Morning Britain; The Repair Shop
Crime Programme	Line of Duty	Line of Duty; Luther; Silent Witness
Streamed Programme	The Crown	The Crown; After Life; Our Planet; The Grand Tour
TV Judge	David Walliams	David Walliams; Olly Murs; Simon Cowell will.i.am
News Presenter	Fiona Bruce	Fiona Bruce; Jon Snow; Susanna Reid
TV Personality	Ant & Dec	Ant & Dec; Claudia Winkleman; Graham Norton; Romesh Ranganathan
Radio Personality	Greg James	Greg James; Chris Evans; Roman Kemp
Podcast of the Year	That Peter Crouch Podcast	That Peter Crouch Podcast; Brexitcast; Sh**ged Married Annoyed; The Frank Skinner Show

=== 2019 winners ===
50th TRIC awards: Hosted by Lisa Snowdon
Award	Winners	Nominees
TRIC Special Award 2019	Lorraine Kelly	-
Soap of the Year	Emmerdale	Coronation Street; EastEnders; Emmerdale; Hollyoaks
Soap Actor	Danny Dyer (as Mick Carter) EastEnders	Danny Dyer (as Mick Carter) EastEnders; Kellie Bright (as Linda Carter) EastEnders; Rosie Marcel (as Jac Naylor) Casualty / Holby City
Entertainment Programme	Michael McIntyre's Big Show	Michael McIntyre's Big Show; 8 Out of 10 Cats Does Countdown; The Graham Norton Show
Reality Programme	Strictly Come Dancing	I'm a Celebrity...Get Me Out of Here! Love Island; Strictly Come Dancing
Sports Programme	A League of Their Own; Match of the Day	A League of Their Own; Channel 4 F1; Gillette Soccer Saturday; Match of the Day
Food Programme	The Great British Bake Off	Gordon, Gino and Fred: Road Trip; MasterChef; The Great British Bake Off
Drama Programme	A Very English Scandal	A Very English Scandal; Call the Midwife; Our Girl
Radio Programme	Capital Breakfast (Roman Kemp)	Capital Breakfast (Roman Kemp); Radio 1 Breakfast (Greg James); The Chris Evans Breakfast Show
Factual Programme	Dynasties	Dynasties; Stacey Dooley Investigates; Who Do You Think You Are
Daytime Programme	The Chase	BBC Breakfast; The Chase; This Morning
Crime Programme	Bodyguard	Bodyguard; Killing Eve; Silent Witness
International Programme	The Handmaid's Tale	Orange Is the New Black; The Bridge; The Handmaid's Tale
News Presenter	Fiona Bruce	Fiona Bruce; Jon Snow; Naga Munchetty
TV Personality	Holly Willoughby	Ant & Dec; Holly Willoughby; Keith Lemon
Radio Personality	Greg James	Greg James; Jamie Theakston; Zoe Ball
Podcast of the Year	You, Me and the Big C	Desert Island Discs; That Peter Crouch; You, Me and the Big C: Putting the can in cancer

=== 2018 winners ===
49th TRIC awards: Hosted by Lisa Snowdon
Award	Winners	Nominees
TRIC Special Award 2018	This Morning	-
Soap of the Year	Emmerdale	Coronation Street; EastEnders; Emmerdale; Hollyoaks
Soap Actor	Ryan Hawley (as Robert Sugden) Emmerdale	Connor McIntyre (as Pat Phelan) Coronation Street; Lucy Fallon (as Bethany Platt) Coronation Street; Ryan Hawley (as Robert Sugden) Emmerdale
Entertainment Programme	I'm a Celebrity...Get Me Out of Here!	I'm a Celebrity...Get Me Out of Here! Strictly Come Dancing; The Voice UK
Reality Programme	Love Island	Love Island; Made in Chelsea; The Real Housewives of Cheshire
Sports Programme	A League of Their Own	A League of Their Own; A Question of Sport; Match of the Day
Food Programme	The Great British Bake Off	Jamie & Jimmy's Friday Night Feast; Masterchef; The Great British Bake Off
Drama Programme	Doctor Foster	Call the Midwife; Doctor Foster; Poldark
Drama Performance	Suranne Jones	Aidan Turner; Cillian Murphy; Suranne Jones
Radio Programme	The Christian O'Connell Breakfast Show	Capital Breakfast (Roman Kemp); The Christian O'Connell Breakfast Show; The Official Vodafone Big Top 40 (Marvin Humes)
Factual Programme	Blue Planet II	24 Hours in A&E; Blue Planet II; Gordon Ramsay on Cocaine
Daytime Programme	This Morning	BBC Breakfast; Loose Women; This Morning
Streamed Programme	Black Mirror	Black Mirror; The Crown; The Grand Tour
News Presenter	Eamonn Holmes	Eamonn Holmes; Kay Burley; Susanna Reid
TV Personality	Ant & Dec	Ant & Dec; Holly Willoughby; Keith Lemon
Radio Personality	Dermot O'Leary	Dermot O'Leary; Rickie, Melvin & Charlie; Sara Cox
Podcast of the Year	Desert Island Discs	Desert Island Discs; Flintoff, Savage and the Ping Pong Guy; My Dad Wrote a Porno

=== 2017 winners ===
48th TRIC awards: Hosted by Jeff Stelling
Award	Winners	Nominees
TRIC Special Award 2017	June Brown	-
Original OTT Streamed	The Crown	The Grand Tour; The Crown; House of Cards
Soap of the Year	EastEnders	Coronation Street; Eastenders; Emmerdale
Entertainment Programme	Ant & Dec's Saturday Night Takeaway	Gogglebox; Have I Got News for You; Ant and Dec's Saturday Night Takeaway
Drama Programme	Poldark	Cold Feet; Poldark; Vera
Radio / Digital Radio Programme	Heart Breakfast (Jamie Theakston & Emma Bunton)	Heart Breakfast (Jamie Theakston & Emma Bunton); Vodafone Big Top 40; The Christian O'Connell Breakfast Show
Daytime Programme	This Morning	BBC Breakfast; Sunday Brunch; This Morning
Reality Programme	Strictly Come Dancing	Britain's Got Talent; Strictly Come Dancing; The X Factor
Sports Programme	Match of the Day	A League of Their Own; Match of the Day; The Last Leg
Factual Programme	Planet Earth II	DIY SOS; Planet Earth II; The Real Marigold Hotel
Crime Programme	Death in Paradise	Death in Paradise; Happy Valley; The Night Manager
Satellite / Digital TV Programme	Celebrity Juice	Celebrity Juice; Made in Chelsea; Towie
Soap Personality	Kym Marsh	June Brown; Kym Marsh; Tina O'Brien
Newscaster / Reporter	Evan Davis	Evan Davis; Jeremy Thompson; Victoria Derbyshire
Sports Presenter / Reporter	Jeff Stelling	Gabby Logan; Jeff Stelling; Sue Barker
TV Personality	Holly Willoughby	Ant & Dec; Holly Willoughby; Keith Lemon
Weather Presenter	Carol Kirkwood	Carol Kirkwood; Laura Tobin; Nazaneen Ghaffar
Radio / Digital Radio Personality	Emma Bunton	Dave Berry; Emma Bunton; Simon Mayo

=== 2016 winners ===
47th TRIC awards: Hosted by Kate Garraway
Award	Winners	Nominees
TRIC Special Award 2016	Casualty	-
Soap of the Year	EastEnders	Casualty; Coronation Street; EastEnders
Entertainment Programme	Peter Kay's Car Share	Gogglebox; Have I Got News for You; Peter Kay's Car Share
Drama Programme	Downton Abbey	Doctor Foster; Doc Martin; Downton Abbey
Radio / Digital Radio Programme	The Chris Evans Breakfast Show	Simon Mayo Drivetime; The Chris Evans Breakfast Show; The Official Chart with Greg James
Daytime Programme	Pointless	BBC Breakfast; Pointless; The Chase
Reality Programme	Strictly Come Dancing	I'm a Celebrity...Get Me Out of Here! Strictly Come Dancing; The Great British Bake Off
Sports Programme	Match of the Day	Grand Prix; Match of the Day; Rugby World Cup 2015 (ITV)
Factual Programme	Grand Designs	Grand Designs; Paul O'Grady: For the Love of Dogs; The Hunt
Crime Programme	Silent Witness	Broadchurch; Ripper Street; Silent Witness
Satellite / Digital TV Programme	Celebrity Juice	Celebrity Juice; I'm a Celebrity, Get Me Out Of Here! Now! The Keith Lemon Sketch Show
Soap Personality	Adam Woodyatt	Adam Woodyatt; David Neilson; Linda Henry
Newscaster / Reporter	Bill Turnbull	Bill Turnbull; Eamonn Holmes; Kate Garraway
Sports Presenter / Reporter	Jeff Stelling	Clare Balding; Gary Lineker; Jeff Stelling
TV Personality	Ant & Dec	Ant & Dec; Graham Norton; Keith Lemon
Weather Presenter	Carol Kirkwood	Carol Kirkwood; Siân Welby; Tomasz Schafernaker
Radio / Digital Radio Personality	Nick Grimshaw	Chris Evans; Nick Grimshaw; Simon Mayo

=== 2015 winners ===
46th TRIC awards: Hosted by Sandi Toksvig
Award	Winners	Nominees
TRIC Special Award 2015	Match of the Day	-
Soap of the Year	Coronation Street	Coronation Street; EastEnders; Hollyoaks
Entertainment Programme	Gogglebox	Ant & Dec's Saturday Night Takeaway; Gogglebox; The Graham Norton Show
Drama Programme	Downton Abbey	Cilla; Doc Martin; Downton Abbey
Radio / Digital Radio Programme	Capital Breakfast (Dave Berry & Lisa Snowdon)	Capital Breakfast (Dave Berry & Lisa Snowdon); 5 Live Breakfast; The Chris Evans Breakfast Show
Daytime Programme	Pointless	BBC Breakfast; Peter Andre's 60 Minute Makeover; Pointless
Reality Programme	Strictly Come Dancing	Britain's Got Talent; Strictly Come Dancing; The Voice UK
Sports Programme	A Question of Sport	A Question of Sport; Grand Prix; Soccer Saturday
Factual Programme	The Great British Bake Off	Paul O'Grady: For the Love of Dogs; The Great British Bake Off; The Mekong River with Sue Perkins
Crime Programme	Silent Witness	Scott & Bailey; Sherlock; Silent Witness
Satellite / Digital TV Programme	Celebrity Juice	Celebrity Juice; I'm a Celebrity, Get Me Out Of Here! Now! Stella
Soap Personality	Danny Dyer	Danny Dyer; Kym Marsh; Simon Gregson
Newscaster / Reporter	Susanna Reid	Ben Shephard; Fiona Bruce; Susanna Reid
Sports Presenter / Reporter	Jeff Stelling	Clare Balding; Jeff Stelling; Suzi Perry
TV Personality	Ant & Dec	Ant & Dec; Graham Norton; Keith Lemon
Weather Presenter	Carol Kirkwood	Carol Kirkwood; Laura Tobin; Tomasz Schafernaker
Radio / Digital Radio Personality	Chris Evans	Chris Evans; Fearne Cotton; Nicky Campbell

=== 2014 winners ===
45th TRIC awards: Hosted by Mary Nightingale
Award	Winners	Nominees
TRIC Special Award 2014	Dancing on Ice	-
Soap of the Year	Coronation Street	Coronation Street; EastEnders; Emmerdale
Entertainment Programme	Gogglebox	Gogglebox; Mrs. Brown's Boys; The Graham Norton Show
Drama Programme	Doctor Who	Call the Midwife; Doctor Who; Downton Abbey
Radio / Digital Radio Programme	The Chris Evans Breakfast Show	Capital Breakfast (Dave Berry & Lisa Snowdon); Heart Breakfast (Jamie Theakston & Emma Bunton); The Chris Evans Breakfast Show
Daytime Programme	This Morning	Pointless; Saturday Kitchen; This Morning
Reality Programme	Strictly Come Dancing	I'm a Celebrity...Get Me Out of Here! Strictly Come Dancing; The Apprentice
Factual Programme	Paul O'Grady: For the Love of Dogs	Educating Yorkshire; Paul O'Grady: For the Love of Dogs; The Great British Bake Off
Crime Programme	Broadchurch	Broadchurch; Luther; Silent Witness
Satellite / Digital TV Programme	Celebrity Juice	Celebrity Juice; I'm a Celebrity, Get Me Out of Here! Now! Made in Chelsea
Satellite / Digital TV Personality	Peter Andre	Joe Swash; Keith Lemon; Peter Andre
Soap Personality	Ashley Taylor Dawson	Julie Hesmondhalgh; Michelle Keegan; Ashley Taylor Dawson
Newscaster / Reporter	Susanna Reid	Fiona Bruce; Lorraine Kelly; Susanna Reid
Sports Presenter / Reporter	Gabby Logan	Clare Balding; Gabby Logan; Sue Barker
TV Personality	Ant & Dec	Ant & Dec; Claudia Winkleman; Paul O'Grady
Weather Presenter	Carol Kirkwood	Carol Kirkwood; Lucy Verasamy; Siân Lloyd
Radio / Digital Radio Personality	Emma Bunton	Chris Evans; Emma Bunton; Scott Mills

=== 2013 winners ===
44th TRIC awards: Hosted by Jon Culshaw
Award	Winners	Nominees
TRIC Special Award 2013	I'm a Celebrity...Get Me Out of Here!	-
Soap of the Year	Coronation Street	Coronation Street; EastEnders; Hollyoaks
Entertainment Programme	Mrs. Brown's Boys	Have I Got News for You; Mock the Week; Mrs. Brown's Boys
Drama Programme	Call the Midwife	Call the Midwife; Downton Abbey; Merlin
Radio / Digital Radio Programme	Capital Breakfast (Dave Berry & Lisa Snowdon)	Capital Breakfast (Dave Berry & Lisa Snowdon); Steve Wright in the Afternoon; The Chris Evans Breakfast Show
Daytime Programme	This Morning	Pointless; Saturday Kitchen; This Morning
Reality Programme	Strictly Come Dancing	I'm a Celebrity...Get Me Out of Here! Strictly Come Dancing; The Apprentice
Factual Programme	Countryfile	Come Dine with Me; Countryfile; Top Gear
Crime Programme	Silent Witness	Lewis; Sherlock; Silent Witness
Satellite / Digital TV Programme	Celebrity Juice	Celebrity Juice; I'm a Celebrity, Get Me Out of Here! Now! Mad Dogs
Satellite / Digital TV Personality	Peter Andre	Keith Lemon; Olly Murs; Peter Andre
Soap Personality	Shane Richie	Michelle Keegan; Nick Pickard; Shane Richie
Newscaster / Reporter	Eamonn Holmes; Sian Williams	Eamonn Holmes; Kate Garraway; Sian Williams
Sports Presenter / Reporter	Clare Balding	Clare Balding; Gary Lineker; Jeff Stelling
TV Personality	Ant & Dec	Alan Carr; Ant & Dec; Stephen Fry
Weather Presenter	Carol Kirkwood	Carol Kirkwood; Lucy Verasamy; Siân Lloyd
Radio / Digital Radio Personality	Chris Evans	Chris Evans; Lisa Snowdon; Scott Mills

=== 2012 winners ===
43rd TRIC awards: Hosted by Eamonn Holmes
Award	Winners	Nominees
TRIC Special Award 2012	June Whitfield CBE	-
Soap of the Year	EastEnders	Coronation Street; EastEnders; Emmerdale
Entertainment Programme	Have I Got News for You	Harry Hill's TV Burp; Have I Got News for You; Outnumbered
Drama Programme	Downton Abbey	Downton Abbey; Garrow's Law; Spooks
Radio / Digital Radio Programme	The Chris Evans Breakfast Show	Capital Breakfast (Johnny Vaughan & Lisa Snowdon); The Chris Evans Breakfast Show; Desert Island Discs
Daytime Programme	This Morning	BBC Breakfast; Loose Women; This Morning
Reality Programme	Strictly Come Dancing	I'm a Celebrity...Get Me Out of Here! Strictly Come Dancing; The Apprentice
Arts / Documentary Programme	The Choir: Military Wives	Countryfile; Frozen Planet; The Choir: Military Wives
Satellite / Digital TV Programme	The Only Way Is Essex	An Idiot Abroad; Ross Kemp: Extreme World; The Only Way Is Essex
Satellite / Digital TV Personality	Peter Andre	Dermot Murnaghan; Keith Lemon; Peter Andre
Soap Personality	Betty Driver (posthumous award)	Betty Driver; Chelsea Halfpenny; Jo Joyner
Newscaster / Reporter	Sian Williams	Eamonn Holmes; Jon Snow; Sian Williams
Sports Presenter / Reporter	Jeff Stelling	Gary Lineker; Jake Humphrey; Jeff Stelling
TV Personality	Alan Carr	Alan Carr; Ant & Dec; Graham Norton
Weather Presenter	Carol Kirkwood	Carol Kirkwood; Lucy Verasamy; Siân Lloyd
Radio / Digital Radio Personality	Chris Evans	Chris Evans; Chris Moyles; Emma Bunton

=== 2011 winners ===
42nd TRIC awards: Hosted by Tony Hadley
Award	Winners	Nominees
TRIC Special Award 2011	A Question of Sport	-
Soap of the Year	Coronation Street	Coronation Street; EastEnders; Hollyoaks
Entertainment Programme	Top Gear	Harry Hill's TV Burp; MasterChef; Top Gear
Drama Programme	Downton Abbey	Ashes To Ashes; Downton Abbey; Sherlock
Radio / Digital Radio Programme	The Chris Evans Breakfast Show	Capital Breakfast (Johnny Vaughan & Lisa Snowdon); The Chris Evans Breakfast Show; The Chris Moyles Show
Daytime Programme	Come Dine with Me	BBC Breakfast; Come Dine with Me; This Morning
Reality Programme	Strictly Come Dancing	Strictly Come Dancing; The Apprentice; The X Factor
Arts / Documentary Programme	Countryfile	Countryfile; The Gadget Show; Wonders of the Solar System
Satellite / Digital TV Programme	The Inbetweeners	An Idiot Abroad; Eddie Izzard: Marathon Man; The Inbetweeners
Satellite / Digital TV Personality	Eamonn Holmes	Eamonn Holmes; Leigh Francis; Peter Andre
Soap Personality	Jessie Wallace	Jennifer Metcalfe; Jessie Wallace; Sally Dynevor
Newscaster / Reporter	Bill Turnbull	Bill Turnbull; Fiona Bruce; Kate Garraway
Sports Presenter / Reporter	Gary Lineker	Gary Lineker; Jake Humphrey; Jeff Stelling
TV Personality	Harry Hill	Alan Carr; Harry Hill; Jeremy Clarkson
Weather Presenter	Clare Nasir	Carol Kirkwood; Clare Nasir; Kirsty McCabe
Radio / Digital Radio Personality	Chris Evans	Chris Evans; Chris Moyles; Simon Mayo

=== 2010 winners ===
41st TRIC awards: Hosted by Sian Williams
Award	Winners	Nominees
TRIC Special Award 2010	Barbara Windsor	-
Soap of the Year	EastEnders	Coronation Street; EastEnders; Hollyoaks
Entertainment Programme	Outnumbered	Gavin & Stacey; Outnumbered; Top Gear
Drama Programme	Doctor Who	Doc Martin; Doctor Who; Shameless
Radio / Digital Radio Programme	The Chris Moyles Show	Chris Evans Drivetime; The Chris Moyles Show; Wake Up to Wogan
Daytime Programme	BBC Breakfast	BBC Breakfast; GMTV; This Morning
Reality Programme	Strictly Come Dancing	Strictly Come Dancing; The Apprentice; The X Factor
Arts / Documentary Programme	Oz and James Drink to Britain	Countryfile; James May's Toy Stories; Oz and James Drink to Britain
Crime Programme	Waking the Dead	Ashes to Ashes; Spooks; Waking the Dead
Satellite / Digital TV Programme	The Inbetweeners	I'm a Celebrity, Get Me Out of Here! Now! Ross Kemp: Return to Afghanistan; The Inbetweeners
Satellite / Digital TV Personality	Eamonn Holmes	Eamonn Holmes; Jeff Stelling; Joe Swash
Soap Personality	Ricky Whittle	Lacey Turner; Ricky Whittle; Simon Gregson
Newscaster / Reporter	Mark Austin	Bill Turnbull; Jon Snow; Mark Austin
Sports Presenter / Reporter	Gary Lineker	Gabby Logan; Gary Lineker; Jeff Stelling
TV Personality	Harry Hill	Harry Hill; James May; Stephen Fry
Weather Presenter	Tomasz Schafernaker	Carol Kirkwood; Peter Cockroft; Tomasz Schafernaker
Radio / Digital Radio Personality	Sir Terry Wogan	Chris Evans; Chris Moyles; Terry Wogan
HD Programme	Life	Jamie's American Road Trip; Life; The Ashes

=== 2009 winners ===
40th TRIC awards: Hosted by Bill Turnbull (on behalf of Sian Williams)
Award	Winners	Nominees
TRIC Special Award 2009	Have I Got News for You	-
Soap of the Year	EastEnders	Coronation Street; EastEnders; Hollyoaks
Entertainment Programme	Top Gear	Grand Prix; Harry Hill's TV Burp; Top Gear
Drama Programme	Lark Rise to Candleford	Lark Rise to Candleford; Little Dorrit; Tess of the d'Urbervilles
Radio / Digital Radio Programme	Capital Breakfast (Johnny Vaughan & Lisa Snowdon)	Capital Breakfast Show; The Chris Moyles Show; Chris Evans Drivetime
Daytime Programme	Loose Women	BBC Breakfast; GMTV; Loose Women
Reality Programme	Strictly Come Dancing	Strictly Come Dancing; The Apprentice; The X Factor
Arts / Documentary Programme	Antiques Roadshow	Antiques Roadshow; The One Show; The Secret Millionaire
Crime Programme	New Tricks	New Tricks; Spooks; Wire in the Blood
Satellite / Digital TV Programme	Gavin & Stacey	Britain's Got More Talent; Ross Kemp in Afghanistan; Gavin & Stacey
Satellite / Digital TV Personality	Eamonn Holmes	Eamonn Holmes; Katie & Peter; Jeff Stelling
Soap Personality	Katherine Kelly	Katherine Kelly; Patsy Palmer; Simon Gregson
Newscaster / Reporter	Sir Trevor McDonald	Fiona Phillips; Fiona Bruce; Sir Trevor McDonald
Sports Presenter / Reporter	Gary Lineker	Adrian Chiles; Gary Lineker; Clare Balding
TV Personality	Alan Carr	Alan Carr; Jeremy Clarkson; Stephen Fry
Weather Presenter	Carol Kirkwood	Carol Kirkwood; Andrea McLean; Siân Lloyd
Radio / Digital Radio Personality	Johnny Vaughan	John Humphrys; Chris Evans; Johnny Vaughan
HD Programme	Olympics 2008	Live at the Apollo; Olympics 2008; Tiger - Spy in the Jungle

=== 2008 winners ===
39th TRIC awards: Hosted by Brian Blessed
Award	Winners	Nominees
TRIC Special Award 2008	Antiques Roadshow	-
Soap of the Year	EastEnders	Coronation Street; EastEnders; Emmerdale
Entertainment Programme	Top Gear	Friday Night with Jonathan Ross; Have I Got News for You; Top Gear
Drama Programme	Cranford	Cranford; Doctor Who; Shameless
Radio / Digital Radio Programme	The Chris Moyles Show	Steve Wright in the Afternoon; The Chris Moyles Show; The Christian O'Connell Breakfast Show
Daytime Programme	A Place in the Sun	A Place in the Sun; Deal or No Deal; This Morning
Reality Programme	Strictly Come Dancing	Dragons' Den; Strictly Come Dancing; The X Factor
Arts / Documentary Programme	Coast	Coast; The F Word; Long Way Down
Crime Programme	Life on Mars	Life on Mars; Spooks; Wire in the Blood
Satellite / Digital TV Programme	I'm a Celebrity, Get Me Out of Here! Now!	I'm a Celebrity, Get Me Out of Here! Now! Ross Kemp on Gangs; Secret Diary of a Call Girl
Satellite / Digital TV Personality	Eamonn Holmes	Eamonn Holmes; Katie & Peter; Jeff Stelling
Soap Personality	Kim Ryder	Antony Cotton; Liz Dawn; Kim Ryder
Newscaster / Reporter	Fiona Bruce	Mark Austin; Fiona Bruce; Ben Shephard
Sports Presenter / Reporter	Sue Barker	Sue Barker; Gary Lineker; Gabby Logan
TV Personality	Gordon Ramsay	Fern Britton; Harry Hill; Gordon Ramsay
Weather Presenter	Carol Kirkwood	Carol Kirkwood; John Kettley; Siân Lloyd
Radio / Digital Radio Personality	Johnny Vaughan	Russell Brand; Chris Evans; Johnny Vaughan
TV Advertisement	Cadbury Gorilla	Cadbury Gorilla; Guinness Dominoes; Skoda Fabia

=== 2007 winners ===
38th TRIC awards: Hosted by Dermot Murnaghan
Award	Winners	Nominees
TRIC Special Award 2007	Emmerdale	-
Soap of the Year	Coronation Street	Coronation Street; EastEnders; Hollyoaks
Entertainment Programme	Have I Got News for You	Friday Night with Jonathan Ross; Have I Got News for You; Top Gear
Drama Programme	Spooks	Doctor Who; Jane Eyre; Spooks
Radio / Digital Radio Programme	The Chris Moyles Show	Chris Evans Drivetime; Steve Wright in the Afternoon; The Chris Moyles Show
Daytime Programme	Deal or No Deal	BBC Breakfast; Deal or No Deal; GMTV
Reality Programme	Strictly Come Dancing	Dragon's Den; Strictly Come Dancing; The X Factor
Arts / Documentary Programme	Planet Earth	Grand Designs; Planet Earth; Coast
Satellite / Digital TV Programme	The Xtra Factor (ITV 2)	Brainiac: Science Abuse; Soccer Saturday; The Xtra Factor (ITV 2)
Satellite / Digital TV Personality	Richard Hammond	Richard Hammond; Ben Shephard; Jeff Stelling
Soap Personality	Lacey Turner	Simon Gregson; Lacey Turner; Bradley Walsh
Newscaster / Reporter	Fiona Bruce	Fiona Bruce; Natasha Kaplinsky; Dermot Murnaghan
Sports Presenter / Reporter	Gary Lineker	Gary Lineker; Gabby Logan; Ally McCoist
TV Personality	Ant & Dec	Ant & Dec; Gordon Ramsay; Jonathan Ross
Weather Presenter	Siân Lloyd	Isobel Lang; Siân Lloyd; Helen Willetts
Radio / Digital Radio Personality	Chris Moyles	Chris Moyles; Jonathan Ross; Johnny Vaughan

=== 2006 winners ===
37th TRIC awards: Hosted by Ainsley Harriott
Award	Winners	Nominees
TRIC Special Award 2006	David Dimbleby	-
Soap of the Year	Coronation Street	
Entertainment Programme	Strictly Come Dancing	I'm a Celebrity...Get Me Out of Here! Strictly Come Dancing; Top Gear; The X Factor
Drama Programme	Bleak House	Bleak House; Doctor Who; Shakespeare Re-Told
Radio / Digital Radio Programme	Steve Wright in the Afternoon	
Morning / Daytime Programme	BBC Breakfast	
Comedy Programme	Little Britain	
Arts / Documentary Programme	A Picture of Britain	
Satellite / Digital TV Programme	The Xtra Factor (ITV 2)	
Satellite / Digital TV Personality	Richard Hammond	
Newscaster / Reporter	Fiona Bruce	
Sports Presenter / Reporter	Gary Lineker	
TV Personality	Paul O'Grady	Ant & Dec; Paul O'Grady; Jonathan Ross
New TV Talent	Billie Piper	
Weather Presenter	Helen Willetts	
Radio / Digital Radio Personality	Chris Moyles	

=== 2005 winners ===
36th TRIC awards: Hosted by June Whitfield
Award	Winners	Nominees
TRIC Special Award 2005	Ronnie Corbett	-
Soap of the Year	Coronation Street	Coronation Street; EastEnders; Emmerdale
Entertainment Programme	Strictly Come Dancing	Friday Night with Jonathan Ross; Strictly Come Dancing; Top Gear
Drama Programme	Spooks	Blackpool; Spooks; Wire in the Blood
Radio / Digital Radio Programme	I'm Sorry I Haven't a Clue	I'm Sorry I Haven't a Clue; Radio 1 Breakfast; Wake Up to Wogan
Morning / Daytime Programme	BBC Breakfast	BBC Breakfast; Richard & Judy; This Morning
Comedy Programme	Little Britain	Little Britain; Max and Paddy's Road to Nowhere; Two Pints of Lager and a Packet of Crisps
Music and Arts Programme	Himalaya with Michael Palin	British Isles – A Natural History; Himalaya with Michael Palin; Rolf on Art
Satellite / Digital TV Programme	I'm a Celebrity, Get Me Out of Here! Now!	Brainiac: Science Abuse; I'm a Celebrity, Get Me Out of Here! Now! UEFA Champions League
Satellite / Digital TV Personality	Richard Hammond	Richard Hammond; Tara Palmer-Tomkinson; Ben Shephard
Newscaster / Reporter	Natasha Kaplinsky	George Alagiah; Huw Edwards; Natasha Kaplinsky; Nicholas Owen
Sports Presenter / Reporter	John Inverdale	Clare Balding; Rob Bonnet; John Inverdale; Jim Rosenthal
TV Personality	Ant & Dec	Ant & Dec; Natasha Kaplinsky; Jonathan Ross
New TV Talent	Richard Hammond	Sam Aston; Matt Dawson; Richard Hammond
Weather Presenter	Siân Lloyd	Siân Lloyd; Penny Tranter; Helen Young
Music Personality	Jamelia	Jamelia; Katie Melua; Joss Stone; Natasha Bedingfield
Radio / Digital Radio Personality	Jonathan Ross	Nicky Campbell; Jonathan Ross; Jeremy Vine; Johnnie Walker

=== 2004 winners ===
35th TRIC awards: Hosted by Charlie Dimmock
Award	Winners	Nominees
TRIC Special Award 2004	Alan Titchmarsh	-
Soap of the Year	Coronation Street	Coronation Street; EastEnders; Emmerdale
Entertainment Programme	Relocation, Relocation	Have I Got News for You; Friday Night with Jonathan Ross; Relocation, Relocation
Drama Programme	Charles II	Auf Wiedersehen, Pet; Charles II; Henry VIII
Radio / Digital Radio Programme	Woman's Hour	I'm Sorry I Haven't a Clue; Wake Up to Wogan; Woman's Hour
Morning / Daytime Programme	BBC Breakfast	BBC Breakfast; GMTV; Kilroy
Comedy Programme	Absolutely Fabulous	Absolutely Fabulous; The Kumars at No. 42; The Office
Music and Arts Programme	The Big Read	Restoration; Rolf on Art; The Big Read
Satellite / Digital TV Programme	Soccer AM	Pop Idol Extra; Soccer AM; Soccer Saturday
Satellite / Digital TV Personality	Jeremy Thompson	Helen Chamberlain; Jeremy Thompson; Kate Thornton
Newscaster / Reporter	Mary Nightingale	Huw Edwards; Mary Nightingale; Rageh Omaar
Sports Presenter / Reporter	Gabby Logan	John Inverdale; Gary Lineker; Gabby Logan
TV Personality	Jonathan Ross	Ant & Dec; Simon Cowell; Jonathan Ross
New TV Talent	Christopher Parker	Kirstie Allsopp; Christopher Parker; David Walliams
Weather Presenter	Michael Fish	Michael Fish; Siân Lloyd; Helen Willetts
Radio / Digital Radio Personality	Jonathan Ross	Chris Moyles; Jenni Murray; Jonathan Ross

=== 2003 winners ===
34th TRIC awards: Hosted by Angela Rippon
Award	Winners	Nominees
TRIC Special Award 2003	Bob Monkhouse	-
Soap of the Year	Coronation Street	Coronation Street; EastEnders; Hollyoaks
Entertainment Programme	Have I Got News for You	Fame Academy; Have I Got News for You; Jamie's Kitchen
Drama Programme	Tipping the Velvet	Gathering Storm; Tipping the Velvet; Waking the Dead
Radio / Digital Radio Programme	I'm Sorry I Haven't a Clue	I'm Sorry I Haven't a Clue; Radio 1 Breakfast (Sara Cox); Wake Up to Wogan
Documentary Programme	Sahara with Michael Palin	The Life of Mammals; Sahara with Michael Palin; Steve Leonard's Extreme Animals
Morning / Daytime Programme	GMTV	Bargain Hunt; BBC Breakfast; GMTV
Comedy Programme	The Office	My Family; The Kumars at No. 42; The Office
Music and Arts Programme	Later... with Jools Holland	Elton John at the Royal Opera House; Later... with Jools Holland; Top of the Pops
Satellite / Digital TV Programme	Kirsty's Home Videos	Fear Factor; Kirsty's Home Videos; Temptation Island
Satellite / Digital TV Personality	Ed Hall	Helen Chamberlain; Ed Hall; Ed Sanders
Newscaster / Reporter	Fiona Bruce	Fiona Bruce; Sir Trevor McDonald; Mary Nightingale
Sports Presenter / Reporter	Gary Lineker	Gary Lineker; Gabby Logan; Ally McCoist
TV Personality	Davina McCall	Davina McCall; Graham Norton; Jamie Oliver
New TV Talent	Susie Amy	Susie Amy; Natasha Kaplinsky; Kris Marshall
Drama TV Performer	Martin Shaw	Amanda Burton; Albert Finney; Martin Shaw
Weather Presenter	Carol Kirkwood	Michael Fish; Carol Kirkwood; Siân Lloyd
Radio / Digital Radio Personality	Sara Cox	Sara Cox; Jonathan Ross; Terry Wogan

=== 2002 winners ===
33rd TRIC awards: Hosted by Tom O'Connor
Award	Winners
TRIC Special Award 2002	Gloria Hunniford
Soap of the Year	EastEnders
Entertainment Programme	Pop Idol
Drama Programme	The Way We Live Now
Radio / Digital Radio Programme	The News Quiz
Documentary Programme	The Blue Planet
Morning / Daytime Programme	A Place in the Sun
Comedy Programme	Linda Green
Music and Arts Programme	CD:UK
Satellite / Digital TV Programme	LA Pool Party
Satellite / Digital TV Personality	Kirsty Gallacher
Newscaster / Reporter	Mary Nightingale
Sports Presenter / Reporter	Gabby Logan
TV Personality	Ant & Dec
New TV Talent	Ronni Ancona
Drama TV Performer	James Nesbitt
Radio / Digital Radio Personality	Sara Cox

=== 2001 awards ===
32nd TRIC awards: Hosted by Roy Hudd
Award	Winners
TRIC Special Award 2001	Coronation Street
Entertainment Programme	The Weakest Link
Drama Programme	Fat Friends
Radio / Digital Radio Programme	The News Huddlines
Documentary Programme	Castaway 2000
Morning / Daytime Programme	GMTV
Comedy Programme	The Royle Family
Music and Arts Programme	The Brit Awards
Satellite / Digital TV Programme	Harry Enfield's Brand Spanking New Show
Satellite / Digital TV Personality	Denise Van Outen
Newscaster / Reporter	Peter Sissons
Sports Presenter / Reporter	Ally McCoist
TV Personality	Graham Norton
New TV Talent	Craig Doyle
Drama TV Performer	Sarah Lancashire
Radio / Digital Radio Personality	Jonathan Ross

=== 2000 awards ===
31st TRIC awards: Hosted by Gloria Hunniford
Award	Winners
TRIC Special Award 2000	Cilla Black
Entertainment Programme	Who Wants to Be a Millionaire?
Drama Programme	Oliver Twist
Radio / Digital Radio Programme	Jonathan Ross BBC Radio 2
Documentary Programme	Walking with Dinosaurs
Morning / Daytime Programme	GMTV
Comedy Programme	Cold Feet
Music and Arts Programme	The South Bank Show
Satellite / Digital TV Channel	BBC News 24
Satellite / Digital TV Personality	Liza Tarbuck
Newscaster / Reporter	Dermot Murnaghan
Sports Presenter / Reporter	Gabby Yorath
TV Personality	Carol Vorderman
New TV Talent	Charlie Dimmock
Drama TV Performer	Helen Baxendale
Radio / Digital Radio Personality	Zoe Ball

=== 1990s ===
==== 1999 winners ====
30th TRIC awards: Hosted by Bruce Gyngell
Award	Winners
TRIC Special Award 1999	June Whitfield
BBC TV Programme	Vanity Fair
ITV Programme	Goodnight Mister Tom
Channel 4 Programme	The Big Breakfast
Radio Programme	5 Live Breakfast
Factual / Science Based Programme	The Human Body
TV Comedy	They Think It's All Over
Satellite / Digital TV Channel	Discovery Channel
BBC TV Personality	Jill Dando
ITV / Channel 4 / Channel 5 Personality	Johnny Vaughan
Satellite / Digital TV Personality	Melinda Messenger
Radio Personality	John Peel
Newscaster / Reporter	Trevor McDonald
Sports Presenter / Reporter	Sue Barker
New TV Talent	Katie Derham

==== 1998 winners ====
29th TRIC awards: Hosted by Sir Bernard Ingham
Award	Winner
BBC TV Programme	Full Circle with Michael Palin
ITV Programme	Coronation Street
Channel 4 Programme	Brookside
Radio Programme	Radio 5 Live Breakfast
Factual / Science Based Programme	Children's Hospital
Satellite TV Programme / Channel	Discovery Channel
TV Comedy	Men Behaving Badly
TV Theme Music	Thief Takers
BBC TV Personality	Michael Palin
ITV / Channel 4 Personality	David Jason
Satellite TV Personality	Ainsley Harriott
Radio Personality	Steve Wright
Newscaster / Reporter	Kirsty Young
Sports Presenter	Sue Barker
New TV Talent	Emilia Fox

==== 1997 winners ====
28th TRIC awards
Award	Winner
TRIC Special Award 1997	The Archers
BBC TV Programme	Have I Got News For You
ITV Programme	Band of Gold II
Channel 4 Programme	Father Ted
Radio Programme	Wake Up To Wogan
TV Comedy	Only Fools and Horses
Satellite TV Personality	Vinnie Jones
Radio Personality	Chris Evans
Newscaster / Reporter	Trevor McDonald
Sports Presenter / Reporter	Des Lynam
New TV Talent	Caroline Aherne

==== 1996 winners ====
27th TRIC awards
Award	Winner
TRIC Special Award 1996	EastEnders
BBC TV Programme	Pride and Prejudice
ITV Programme	Soldier Soldier
Channel 4 Programme	The Big Breakfast
Radio Programme	A Classic Romance
Factual / Science Based Programme	Panorama
Satellite TV Programme / Channel	Sky Sports
TV Sitcom	One Foot in the Grave Christmas Special
TV Theme Music	Heartbeat
BBC TV Personality	Anthea Turner
ITV / Channel 4 Personality	Eamonn Holmes
Radio Personality	Margaret Howard
Satellite TV Personality	Julia Carling
Newscaster / Reporter	John Suchet
Sports Presenter / Reporter	Helen Rollason
New TV Talent	Emma Forbes

==== 1995 winners ====
26th TRIC awards: Hosted by Bob Monkhouse
Award	Winners
TRIC Special Award 1995	Coronation Street
BBC TV Programme	Martin Chuzzlewit / Middlemarch
ITV / Channel 4 Programme	Heartbeat
Radio Programme	The News Huddlines
Factual / Science Based Programme	South Bank Show
TV Sitcom	Outside Edge
TV Theme Music	Peak Practice
BBC TV Personality	Angus Deayton
ITV / Channel 4 Personality	Clive Anderson
Radio Personality	Alistair Cooke
Newscaster / Reporter	Martin Bell
Sports Presenter	Sue Barker
New TV Talent	Steve Coogan

==== 1994 winners ====
25th TRIC Awards: Hosted by Bob Monkhouse
Award	Winners
BBC TV Programme	To Play the King
ITV / Channel 4 Programme	Prime Suspect III
Radio Programme	The Masterson Inheritance
Factual / Science Based Programme	The Downing Street Years
Satellite TV Channel	CNN International
TV Sitcom	Absolutely Fabulous
TV Theme Music	Taggart
BBC TV Personality	Noel Edmonds
ITV / Channel 4 Personality	Michael Barrymore
Radio Personality	Melvyn Bragg
Newscaster / Reporter	Carol Barnes
Sports Presenter / Reporter	Steve Rider
New TV Talent	Paul McKenna

==== 1993 winners ====
24th TRIC Awards: Hosted by Sir David Frost
Award	Winners
BBC TV Programme	Love Hurts
ITV Programme	The Cook Report
Radio Programme	All of Classic FM
TV Sitcom	Birds of a Feather
BBC TV Personality	Lenny Henry
ITV Personality	Des O'Connor
Radio Personality	Gloria Hunniford
Newscaster / Reporter	Trevor McDonald
Sports Presenter / Reporter	Des Lynam
New TV Talent	Paul Merton

==== 1992 winners ====
23rd TRIC Awards: Hosted by Johnny Beerling
Award	Winners
TRIC Special Award 1992	John Tusa
BBC TV Programme	Spender
ITV Programme	London's Burning
Radio Programme	The Archers
Satellite TV Channel	Sky News
TV Sitcom	Drop The Dead Donkey
BBC TV Personality	Jasper Carrott
ITV Personality	Michael Barrymore
Radio Personality	Danny Baker
Newscaster / Reporter	Lisa Aziz
Sports Presenter / Reporter	John McCririck
New TV Talent	Angus Deayton

==== 1991 winners ====
22nd TRIC Awards
Award	Winners
BBC TV Programme	The Paradise Club
ITV Programme	Poirot
Radio Programme	Angela Rippon's Morning Report
Science Based Programme	The Trials of Life
Children's Programme	On Your Marks
TV Sitcom	Birds of a Feather
TV Theme Music	Inspector Morse
BBC TV Personality	Bruce Forsyth
ITV Personality	Brian Walden
Radio Personality	Desmond Carrington
Newscaster / Reporter	Sue Carpenter
Sports Presenter / Reporter	Reg Gutteridge
New TV Talent	Lorraine Kelly

==== 1990 winners ====
21st TRIC awards: Hosted by Prince Michael of Kent
Award	Winners
BBC TV Programme	Mother Love
ITV Programme	The Bill
Radio Programme	Start the Week
Science Based Programme	QED
Children's Programme	Going Live!
TV Sitcom	A Bit of a Do
TV Theme Music	Summer's Lease
BBC TV Personality	Edna Everage
ITV Personality	Clive James
Radio Personality	Sue McGregor
Newscaster / Reporter	Kate Adie
Sports Presenter / Reporter	Jim Rosenthal
New TV Talent	Cast of Naked Video

=== 1980s ===
==== 1989 winners ====
20th TRIC awards: Hosted by Angela Rippon
Award	Winners
BBC TV Programme	Christabel
ITV Programme	Inspector Morse
Radio Programme	The Jimmy Young Show
Science Based Programme	Supersense
Children's Programme	The Lion, Witch, and the Wardrobe
TV Sitcom	Don't Wait Up
TV Theme Music	Precious Bane
BBC TV Personality	David Jason
ITV Personality	Cilla Black
Radio Personality	Chris Tarrant
Newscaster / Reporter	Gordon Honeycombe
Sports Presenter / Reporter	Harry Carpenter
New TV Talent	Hale and Pace

==== 1988 winners ====
19th TRIC awards: Hosted by Jan Leeming
Award	Winners
BBC TV Programme	A Perfect Spy
ITV Programme	The Charmer
Radio Programme	Steve Race presents Radio Orchestra Show
Science Based Programme	Tomorrow's World
Children's Programme	Wide Awake Club
TV Sitcom	Bread
TV Theme Music	Whicker's World
BBC TV Personality	Ronnie Barker
ITV Personality	Michael Aspel
Radio Personality	Steve Wright
Newscaster / Reporter	Moira Stewart
Sports Presenter / Reporter	Des Lynam

==== 1987 winners ====
18th TRIC awards
Award	Winners
BBC TV Programme	The Singing Detective
ITV Programme	First Among Equals
Radio Programme	Today (Radio 4)
Science Based Programme	Sky at Night
Children's Programme	Blue Peter
TV Sitcom	'Allo 'Allo!
TV Theme Music	EastEnders
BBC TV Personality	Terry Wogan
ITV Personality	Anneka Rice
Radio Personality	Derek Jameson
Newscaster / Reporter	Sue Lawley
Sports Presenter / Reporter	Des Lynam

==== 1986 winners ====
17th TRIC awards
Award	Winners
TRIC Special Award 1986	Women's Hour
BBC TV Programme	EastEnders
ITV Programme	Spitting Image
Radio Programme	The Network Chart Show
Science Based Programme	Tomorrow's World
TV Sitcom	'Allo 'Allo!
TV Theme Music	Howard's Way
BBC TV Personality	Terry Wogan
ITV Personality	Anne Diamond
Radio Personality	John Dunn
Newscaster / Reporter	Frank Bough
Sports Presenter / Reporter	Jimmy Greaves

==== 1985 winners ====
16th TRIC awards
Award	Winners
BBC TV Programme	Tenko
ITV Programme	Minder
Radio Programme	The News Huddlines
Science Based Programme	Tomorrow's World
TV Sitcom	Just Good Friends
TV Theme Music	Minder
BBC TV Personality	Noel Edmonds
ITV Personality	Michael Aspel
Radio Personality	Brian Redhead
Newscaster / Reporter	Selina Scott
Sports Presenter / Reporter	Des Lynam

==== 1984 winners ====
15th TRIC awards
Award	Winners
BBC TV Programme	Last of the Summer Wine
ITV Programme	Minder
Radio Programme	The Grumbleweeds
Science Based Programme	Horizon
TV Sitcom	Only Fools and Horses
TV Theme Music	Reilly, Ace of Spies
BBC TV Personality	Terry Wogan
ITV Personality	Michael Aspel
Radio Personality	John Dunn
Newscaster / Reporter	Frank Bough
Sports Presenter / Reporter	David Coleman

==== 1983 winners ====
14th TRIC awards
Award	Winners
BBC TV Programme	Smiley's People
ITV Programme	The Professionals
Radio Programme	Friday Night is Music Night
Science Based Programme	Tomorrow's World
TV Sitcom	To the Manor Born
TV Theme Music	Harry's Game
BBC TV Personality	Terry Wogan
ITV Personality	Michael Aspel
Radio Personality	Gloria Hunniford
Newscaster / Reporter	Selina Scott
Sports Presenter / Reporter	Dickie Davies

==== 1982 winners ====
13th TRIC awards
Award	Winners
BBC TV Programme	Last of the Summer Wine
ITV Programme	Brideshead Revisited
Radio Programme	Melodies for You
Science Based Programme	Tomorrow's World
TV Sitcom	Yes Minister
TV Theme Music	Brideshead Revisited
BBC TV Personality	Ronnie Barker
ITV Personality	Benny Hill
Radio Personality	Terry Wogan
Newscaster / Reporter	Jan Leeming
Sports Presenter / Reporter	Frank Bough

==== 1981 winners ====
12th TRIC awards
Award	Winners
BBC TV Programme	Not the Nine O'Clock News
ITV Programme	The Professionals
Radio Programme	Desert Island Discs
Science Based Programme	Life on Earth
TV Sitcom	Minder
TV Theme Music	To Serve Them All My Days
BBC TV Personality	Janet Brown
ITV Personality	Paul Daniels
Radio Personality	Kenny Everett
Newscaster / Reporter	Jan Leeming
Sports Presenter / Reporter	John Arlott

==== 1980 winners ====
11th TRIC awards
Award	Winners
BBC TV Programme	Secret Army
ITV Programme	Rumpole of the Bailey
Radio Programme	The World at One
Science Based Programme	Tomorrow's World
TV Sitcom	Fawlty Towers
TV Theme Music	Tinker Tailor Soldier Spy
BBC TV Personality	Penelope Keith
ITV Personality	Kenny Everett
Radio Personality	Terry Wogan
Newscaster / Reporter	Richard Baker
Sports Presenter / Reporter	John Arlott

=== 1970s ===
==== 1979 winners ====
11th TRIC awards
Award	Winners
BBC TV Programme	All Creatures Great and Small
ITV Programme	Lillie
Radio Programme	The Jimmy Young Show
Science Based Programme	The Botanic Man
TV Sitcom	The Good Life
TV Theme Music	Who Pays the Ferryman?
BBC TV Personality	Penelope Keith
ITV Personality	Jasper Carrott
Radio Personality	Terry Wogan
Newscaster / Reporter	Anna Ford

==== 1978 winners ====
10th TRIC awards
Award	Winners
BBC TV Programme	The Two Ronnies
ITV Programme	The Muppet Show
Radio Programme	Noel Edmond's Breakfast Show
Science Based Programme	The World About Us
TV Sitcom	The Good Life
TV Theme Music	Who Pays the Ferryman?
BBC TV Personality	Ronnie Barker
ITV Personality	Leonard Rossiter
Radio Personality	Frank Muir
Newscaster / Reporter	Angela Rippon

==== 1977 winners ====
9th TRIC awards
Award	Winners
BBC TV Programme	When the Boat Comes in
ITV TV Programme	The Sweeney
Radio Programme	Today (BBC Radio 4)
Science Based Programme	Tomorrow's World
TV Sitcom	The Good Life
TV Theme Music	Sailor
BBC TV Personality	Mike Yarwood
ITV Personality	John Thaw
Radio Personality	Terry Wogan
Newscaster / Reporter	Angela Rippon

==== 1976 winners ====
8th TRIC awards
Award	Winners
BBC TV Programme	The World About Us
ITV Programme	Edward the Seventh
Radio Programme	The World at One
Science Based Programme	The Tribal Eye
TV Sitcom	Porridge
TV Theme Music	The Onedin Line
BBC TV Personality	John Cleese
ITV Personality	Benny Hill
Radio Personality	Pete Murray
Newscaster / Reporter	Angela Rippon

==== 1975 winners ====
7th TRIC awards
Award	Winners
Radio Programme	Today (BBC Radio 4)
Radio Personality	Terry Wogan

==== 1974 winners ====
7th TRIC awards
Award	Winners
BBC TV Programme	Colditz
IBA TV Programme	Upstairs, Downstairs
Science Based Programme	Tomorrow's World
Radio Programme	Today (BBC Radio 4)
BBC TV Personality	Ronnie Barker
IBA TV Personality	Richard O'Sullivan
Radio Personality	Robert Robinson
Newscaster	Robert Dougal

==== 1973 winners ====
5th TRIC awards
Award	Winners
TV Programme	Today (Radio 4)

==== 1972 winners ====
4th TRIC awards
Award	Winners
TV Programme	The Morecambe & Wise Show
Radio Programme	Today (BBC Radio 4)
TV Personality	Frankie Howard
Radio Personality	John Dunn

==== 1971 winners ====
3rd TRIC awards
Award	Winners
Best Programme	Six Wives of Henry VIII
TV Personality	Jack de Manio
Radio Personality	Jack de Manio

==== 1970 winners ====
2nd TRIC awards
Award	Winners
Best Programme	Softly, Softly
TV Personality	Val Doonican
Radio Personality	Val Doonican

=== 1960s ===
==== 1969 winners ====
Award	Winners
Programme of the Year	The Forsyte Saga
TV Personality	Val Doonican
Radio Personality	Kenneth Horne
