= Carol Kirkwood =

Scottish weather presenter (born 1962)

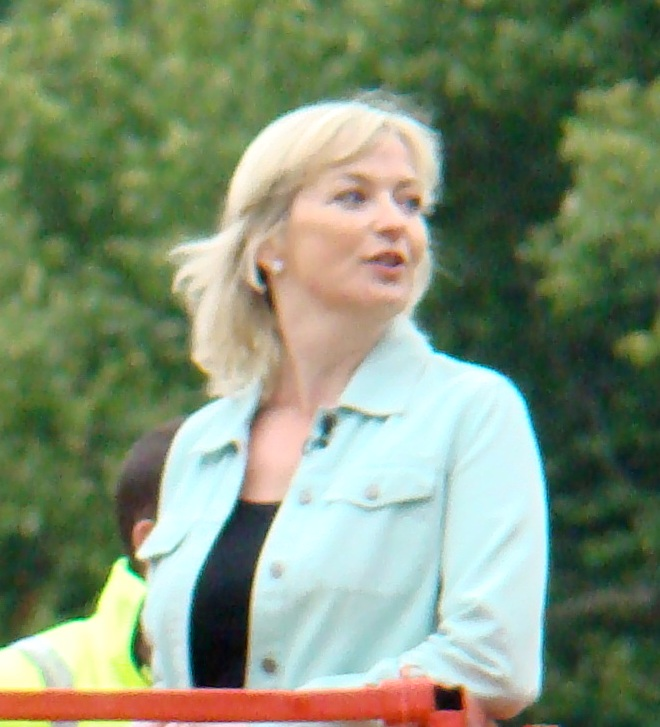
- Kirkwood in 2008
- Born: Carol Anne MacKellaig; 29 May 1962 (age 64); Morar, Inverness-shire, Scotland
- Education: Napier University
- Occupation: Television presenter
- Years active: 1992–2026
- Known for: BBC Breakfast; Victoria Derbyshire; Strictly Come Dancing
- Spouses: Jimmy Kirkwood (m. 1986, divorced); Steve Randall (m. 2023)

Carol Anne Kirkwood (née MacKellaig; born 29 May 1962) is a retired Scottish weather presenter. She was trained by the Met Office and worked for the BBC between 1998 and 2026. She is best known for being the main weather presenter for BBC Breakfast for over 25 years. She is also a published author.

== Early life ==
Kirkwood was born as Carol MacKellaig on 29 May 1962 in Morar, Inverness-shire; she was one of eight children (two boys and six girls) to parents who were hoteliers in Morar. She was brought up as a Roman Catholic. After attending Lochaber High School in Fort William, she gained a BA in commerce from Napier College of Commerce and Technology (now Edinburgh Napier University) in Edinburgh.

== Career ==
After graduation, she joined the BBC's secretarial reserve in London. In the summer of 1983, she became a production secretary on Breakfast Time and then a production assistant. After a series of internal moves, she presented short slots on BBC Radio Scotland, and then BBC Radio 2 and BBC Radio 4. She then left the BBC and subsequently worked in recruitment and then as a training consultant for a management consultancy in Cheshire. In 1992, she spent time on a now defunct cable TV channel, Windsor TV, latterly called Wire TV, along with Sacha Baron Cohen.

Kirkwood rejoined the BBC at the corporation's Elstree Studios training department in 1993 as a freelance presenter, during which time she also presented a bi-monthly programme Talking Issues for HTV West. In 1996 Kirkwood joined the new UK operation of The Weather Channel, but after it closed down she underwent training under the guidance of the BBC at the Met Office, before joining BBC News in April 1998 as a weather presenter. She has since appeared regularly across all of BBC Weather's output on both radio and television, including BBC News, BBC World News, BBC News at Six and the live forecasts as part of the BBC's coverage of the Wimbledon Tennis Championships.

Kirkwood was the main weather presenter on BBC Breakfast. She presented the BBC's The Weather Show and is also a regular contributor and reporter for The One Show. In 2011, Kirkwood co-presented the BBC One series The Great British Weather. She also presented the weather on BBC Radio 2's The Chris Evans Breakfast Show.

It was announced on 27 January 2026 that Kirkwood would be leaving the BBC in April 2026. She presented her final weather forecast on 1 April.

== Other activities ==
Kirkwood has appeared as a guest on CBBC's show Hacker Time. In 2014, she appeared on BBC One panel show Would I Lie to You? In October 2018, Kirkwood had a cameo appearance on Hollyoaks.

=== Strictly Come Dancing ===
In August 2015, it was announced that Kirkwood would be taking part in the thirteenth series of Strictly Come Dancing, which began in September 2015. She was partnered with professional dancer Pasha Kovalev.

Week No.	Dance/Song	Judges' score					Result
Week No.	Dance/Song	Craig Revel Horwood	Darcey Bussell	Len Goodman	Bruno Tonioli	Total	Result
1	Cha-Cha-Cha – "Thunder in My Heart"	2	5	5	4	16	None
2	Foxtrot – "It's a Lovely Day Today"	4	6	5	5	20	Safe
3	Quickstep – "I'm Gonna Wash That Man Right Outa My Hair"	3	5	5	4	17	Safe
4	Paso Doble – "España cañí"	5	6	6	5	22	Safe
5	Viennese waltz – "I've Been Loving You Too Long"	4	6	6	5	21	Safe
6	Rumba – "I Think I Love You"	2	4	4	3	13	Safe
7	American Smooth – "Man! I Feel Like a Woman!"	3	5	5	4	17	Eliminated

== Personal life ==
She was previously married to Jimmy Kirkwood. She announced her engagement to her new partner, Steve Randall, live on BBC Breakfast from the Chelsea Flower Show, on 23 May 2022. They were married at Cliveden in Taplow, Buckinghamshire, on 27 December 2023 and live in Bray, Berkshire.

== Awards ==
Kirkwood won the Television and Radio Industries Club (TRIC) award for best TV Weather Presenter in 2003, 2008, 2009 and 2012–2017. She received an Honorary Fellowship from Princess Anne for "contributions to broadcasting" at Inverness College, part of the University of the Highlands and Islands, on 17 November 2015.

== TV appearances ==
- BBC Breakfast (1998–2026) – Weather presenter
- The Great British Weather – Co-presenter
- Hacker Time – Guest
- The Weather Show – Presenter
- The One Show – Reporter
- Would I Lie to You? (2013) – Guest, 1 episode
- Victoria Derbyshire (2015–2020) – Weather presenter
- Strictly Come Dancing (2015) – Participant
- Hollyoaks (2018) – Cameo appearance as Weather presenter
- The People vs Climate Change (2021) – Narrator
- Saturday Kitchen (2022) – Guest, 1 episode

== Books ==
- Under a Greek Moon (HarperCollins, 2021) ISBN 978-0008393380
- The Hotel on the Riviera (HarperCollins, 2022) ISBN 978-0008393434
- Secrets of the Villa Amore (HarperCollins, 2023) ISBN 978-0008550929
- Once Upon a Time in Venice (HarperCollins, 2024) ISBN 978-0008550974
- Meet Me at Sunset (HarperCollins, 2025) ISBN 978-0008715854
- The Christmas Invitation (HarperCollins, 2026) ISBN 978-0008715915
