= Ultra Electronics =

British defence and security company

Ultra Electronics Holdings plc
- Type: subsidiary
- Traded as: LSE: ULE; FTSE 250 component
- Industry: Defence, security, critical detection & control
- Founded: 1920
- Headquarters: London, UK
- Area served: Worldwide
- Key people: Tony Rice, Chairman; Simon Pryce Chief Executive
- Products: Underwater expendables Sonar sensors and systems Radar systems Signature management & power systems Communications; Command, control & intelligence Cyber, Radio frequency Data and power management, Position sensing & control Stores ejection & management Sensors; Instrumentation & control Automated ballistics identification
- Revenue: ▼£850.7 million (2021)
- Operating income: ▼£105.9 million (2021)
- Net income: ▼£66.9 million (2021)
- Number of employees: 4,500 (2022)
- Parent: Advent International
- Website: www.cobhamultra.com

Ultra Electronics Holdings is a British defence and security company. It was listed on the London Stock Exchange and was a constituent of the FTSE 250 Index until it was acquired by Cobham, which is itself owned by Advent International.

The company was originally founded as Edward E. Rosen & Co., a manufacturer of headphones and loudspeakers, in 1920. In 1925, a new company, known as Ultra Electric Ltd., was established. During 1930, the firm launched its first all-electric radio receiver; it produced numerous domestic radio receivers around this time. Ultra diversified into aviation during the Second World War, building fuselage elements and engine components. Relaunching itself into the civilian markets following the conflict, Ultra started producing television sets in 1953. In 1961, Ultra's consumer electronics interests became part of Thorn Electrical Industries.

During 1977, Ultra Electronics was bought by the Dowty Group and regained its independence via a management buyout in 1993. Into the twenty-first century, it has continued to be an active supplier to the aerospace sector; various companies, including Bombardier Aerospace and Airbus, have chosen to incorporate Ultra Electronics' noise reduction and vibration dampening products onto their aircraft. By 2005, Ultra Electronics was ranked as the 66th biggest aerospace company in the world. In August 2021, the British aerospace and defence company, Cobham, agreed to acquire Ultra Electronics in exchange for £2.6 billion.

== History ==
=== Founding to 1945: Early activities ===
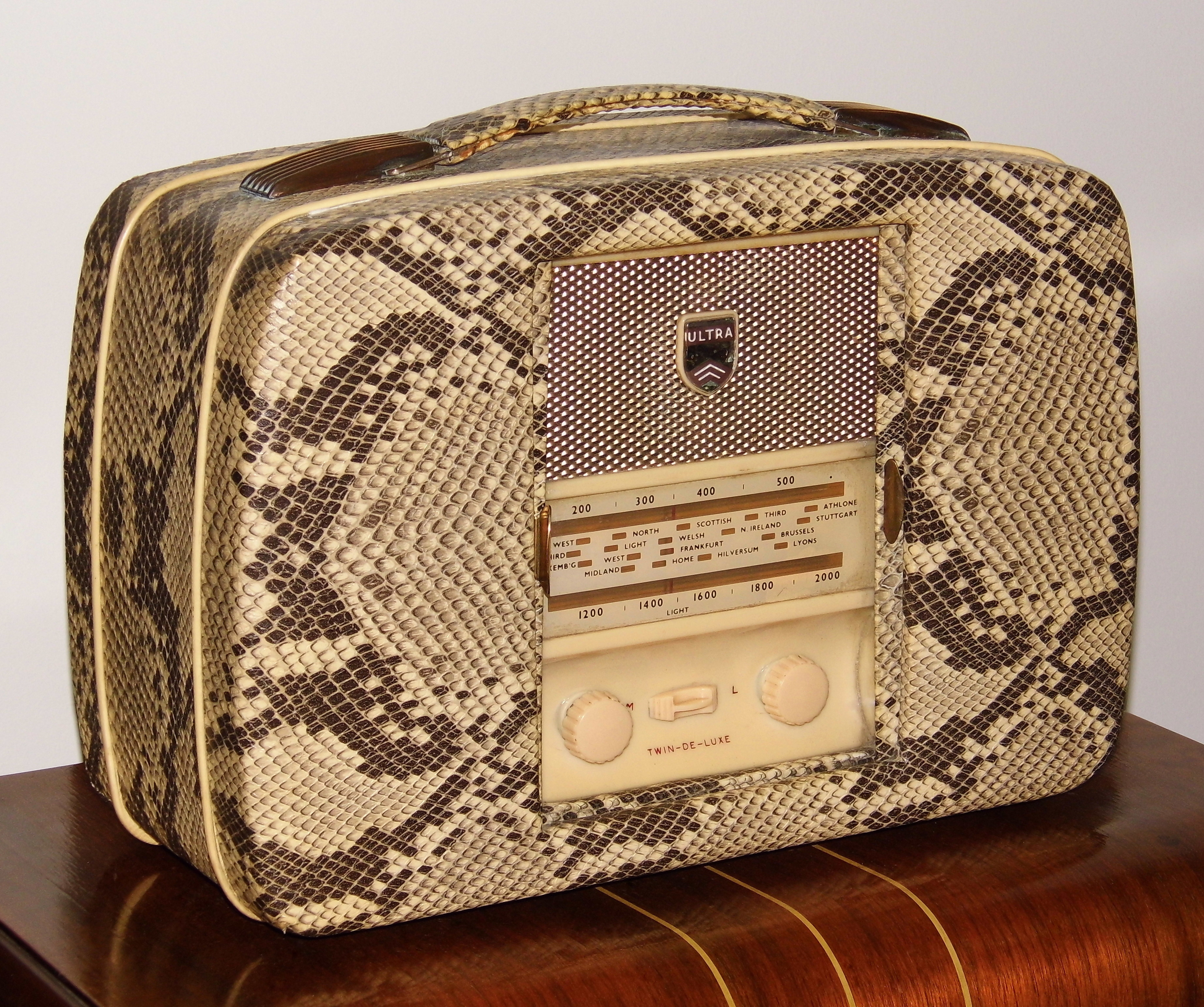
Ultra R906 radio

The company that would eventually become Ultra Electronics was started by wireless specialist Teddy Rosen as Edward E. Rosen & Co. during 1920. The firm was initially focused upon the manufacture of high quality headphones and loudspeakers. During 1923, the company relocated to new premises at Harrow Road, London. In 1925, a new company, known as Ultra Electric Ltd., was formed; the Ultra name had been previously used for one of its products, the first commercial moving iron loudspeaker.

During 1930, Ultra launched its first all-electric radio receiver. During 1931, the firm introduced its first mains-powered wireless set, known as the Ultra Twin Cub. That same year, Ultra received its first order from the aviation industry, having been placed by the Japanese Kawasaki Company. As a result of further expansion, the company moved to larger premises at Erskine Road, Chalk Farm, NW3 in 1932; three years later, a new 150,000 sq ft (14,000 m^{2}) factory at Western Avenue, Acton.

During the 1930s, Ultra manufactured a wide range of domestic radio receivers including the Blue Fox, Lynx, Panther and Tiger models. In 1939, the company presented a television receiver to the market for the BBC High Definition Television Service which was transmitted on 405 lines from the studios at Alexandra Palace, north London.

During the Second World War, Ultra diversified into aviation; the Short Stirling was the first aircraft to incorporate their products, the company acting as a subcontractor to produce tails and bomb doors for the bomber. Ultra would produce a wide range of aerostructures for numerous aircraft throughout the conflict. The firm solely focused on wartime demands, only relaunching itself into the civilian market during 1947, although it would continue to have an interest in the military sector during the post-war period.

=== 1945–1977: Post-war growth ===
Ultra continued to manufacture products for the aviation industry after the conflict. Various engines, including the Armstrong Siddeley Mamba and the Rolls-Royce Avon, incorporated components such as temperature regulators, fuel flow valves, and throttle controls produced by Ultra. Electronic control systems would become a key part of the company's product range.

In 1953, Ultra started manufacturing television sets. During 1956, the firm opened a new factory at Gosport for the production of both televisions and radio sets; Ultra acquired rival company Pilot Radio & Television in 1959. During the following year, Ultra reorganised itself, splitting into two divisions, one specialising in domestic radio and television and the other focused on all other electronic products. In 1961, Ultra's consumer electronics interests became part of Thorn Electrical Industries, who continued to manufacture products using the Ultra brandname until 1974.

As a result of the acquisition, the remainder of the company became Ultra Electronics Ltd. Amongst its varied product range at this time, it produced the "Jezebel" and "Mini-Jezebel" sonobuoys. In 1962, Ultra developed their Search and Rescue and Homing (SARAH) radio beacon, this would be widely used throughout the world. Various subsystems of Concorde, include the droop nose controls and the full authority engine controls, incorporated Ultra technologies.

During 1977, Ultra Electronics was bought by the Dowty Group.

=== 1977–1993: Under Dowty ownership ===
After its acquisition, Ultra Electronics was absorbed into Dowty's Electronics Division.

During the 1980s, the business appears to have continued to grow under the Dowty ownership, with increasing strengths in maritime products such as stealth and anti-submarine programmes, as noted in the 1987 press release accompanying the acquisition of Woodville Polymer Engineering, whose products were used by the Royal Navy in maritime stealth applications.

By 1992, its annual revenues had grown substantially to over £150 million and it formed one of four divisions within Dowty Group, alongside Aerospace, Polymer Engineering and Information Technology divisions.

=== 1993–2000: Management buy-out and expansion ===
In April 1992, British Engineering conglomerate TI Group announced a hostile takeover of Dowty Group, saying at the time that it would sell off Dowty's information technology arm and those parts of the electronic systems division that were not required. The deal closed in June 1992, but Dowty's subsequently reported profits to 31 March turned out to be significantly lower than the estimates disclosed by Doughty during the bid. The Takeover Panel subsequently investigated the behaviour of Dowty and its advisers during the bid and issued a censure of its advisers in August 1992 after the acquisition had successfully completed.

In 1993, following a management buyout led by Julian Blogh of seven of the companies which formed the Dowty Group Electronic Systems Division, Ultra Electronics returned as an independent entity.

In September 1995, Ultra Electronics received its first major export order from the American government, to supply support equipment for its McDonnell Douglas AV-8B Harrier II fleet. It was floated on the London Stock Exchange in 1996.

During the late 1990s, Ultra Electronics began to vigorously promote its active noise control systems, marketed as UltraQuiet: the firm argued that aircraft manufacturers can deploy it to decrease cabin noise, traditionally a significant drawback of turboprop-powered aircraft for users such as regional airliners in comparison to their jet-powered counterparts. It also developed further noise reduction technologies such as "quiet seats" during this period. Various companies, including Bombardier Aerospace and Airbus incorporated Ultra Electronics' noise reduction and vibration dampening products into their aircraft.

=== 2000–2017: Acquisition-led growth ===
According to Flight International, since regaining its independence in the 1990s, Ultra Electronics appeared to have pursued a strategy of diversification, both geographically and by product line. In 2000, Ultra Electronics acquired Datel Ferranti Group. It also acquired American voice communications provider Audiopack Technologies in 2004. By 2005, Ultra Electronics was ranked as the 66th biggest aerospace company in the world: at this point in time, the American market accounted for around one-third of the business's turnover.

During the early 2010s, Ultra continued the acquisition-led growth strategy that had substantially expanded the group since its flotation. By February 2011, it had completed 42 acquisitions, including the purchases of the American portable fuel-cell manufacturer Adaptive Materials and specialist aerospace electronics company Extec Integrated Systems. The company subsequently expanded outside its traditional defence and aerospace markets, acquiring two British cyber-security businesses in 2012 and Canadian ballistics-identification specialist Forensic Technology in 2014 for C$94 million.

In 2015, Ultra made one of the largest acquisitions in its history, agreeing to pay $265 million for the Electronic Products Division of Kratos Defense & Security Solutions, which included the former Herley Industries businesses and strengthened Ultra's position in electronic warfare and radio-frequency systems. The acquisition programme increased Ultra's exposure to smaller specialist suppliers and produced an increasingly complex and decentralised group, factors that later featured in criticism of the company's financial performance and investment priorities.

=== 2017–2021: Crisis and turnaround ===
In 2017, following a profits warning, Ultra's share price dropped by 20% and its chief executive, Rakesh Sharma, resigned. Press reporting at the time blamed the financial difficulties on a number of factors, from earlier acquisitions of 3rd and 4th tier defence suppliers to delays and cancellations in spending by the UK Ministry of Defence. Concerns were also raised around revenue recognition and insufficient investment in existing businesses.

Shortly after appointing a new CEO in 2018, Ultra Electronics shares fell again after the Serious Fraud Office announced it had launched a criminal investigation into “suspected corruption” at the defence contractor.

With a "focus, fix and grow" strategy oriented towards re-investment in its core strength in underwater defence systems and growth in the US market, the share priced recovered strongly from 2019 through to 2020.

=== 2021–present: Acquisition by Cobham, creation of Cobham Ultra and break-up ===
In August 2021, the British aerospace and defence company, Cobham, proposed a £2.6 billion purchase of Ultra Electronics. As the latter is a key national security and defence contractor and Cobham is American owned, the acquisition was the subject of a national security review. In July 2022, the UK government approved the transaction subject to undertakings by Cobham and Ultra.

In 2025, it was announced that US-based power solutions manufacturer Eaton Corporation had agreed to buy Ultra PCS Limited from Cobham Ultra Group for $1.55 billion. The deal completed in January 2026.

In March 2026, Airbus announced that it was buying Ultra I&C's cybersecurity business, Ultra Cyber, based in Maidenhead.

In May 2026, following an 8 year investigation by the Serious Fraud Office, Ultra agreed to pay £15 million as part of a settlement to resolve a probe into suspected corruption at the defence company.

In June 2026, it was announced that Booz Allen Hamilton had agreed to acquire the Ultra I&C Mission Solutions business (Ultra Mission Solutions) for $720 million. Ultra Mission Solutions is a division within Ultra I&C specialising in mission‑critical software, encryption, and edge‑compute products. On 6 July 2026, it was announced that Lockheed Martin had agreed to acquire Ultra Maritime for $3.45 billion. Upon completion of this transaction, the Cobham Ultra Group will comprise just the Cobham tactical communications business within Ultra I&C and the C16 Ventures business.

== Operations ==
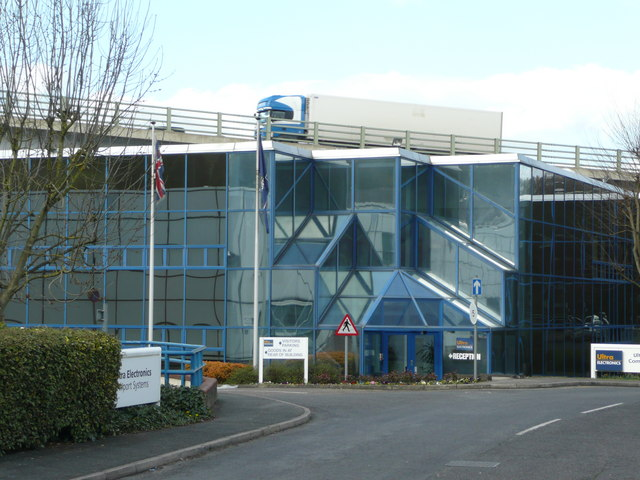
The Ultra Electronics facility at Loudwater, Buckinghamshire

As of 1 July 2026, Cobham is organised into three strategic business units:

- Ultra Maritime: focused on undersea warfare solutions. Lockheed Martin agreed to purchase this business from the Cobham Ultra Group on 6 July 2026.
- Ultra I&C: focused on crypto solutions, mission software and tactical communications for defence applications. Once the sales of the mission solutions business to Booz Allen and the cyber business to Airbus have completed, this will comprise the tactical communications businesses.
- C16 Ventures: makes early stage and growth equity investments within space, aerospace and defence.

It has facilities in the UK, the United States, Canada and Australia. In January 2020, Ultra launched new branding.

=== C16 Ventures portfolio companies ===
C16 Ventures is a Corporate Venture Capital fund that makes early stage and growth equity investments, with a focus on innovation within space, aerospace and defence. Its current portfolio companies include the following:

- Albedo: systems for very low earth orbit (VLEO) satellites
- Slingshot Aerospace: integrated data and analytics for managing space operations
- D-Orbit: space logistics and transportation with a proprietary ION Satellite Carrier platform
- ICEYE: focused on miniaturized Synthetic Aperture Radar (SAR) satellites and integrated analytics solutions

== See also ==
- Aerospace industry in the United Kingdom
