= Siân Lloyd =

Welsh television presenter and meteorologist

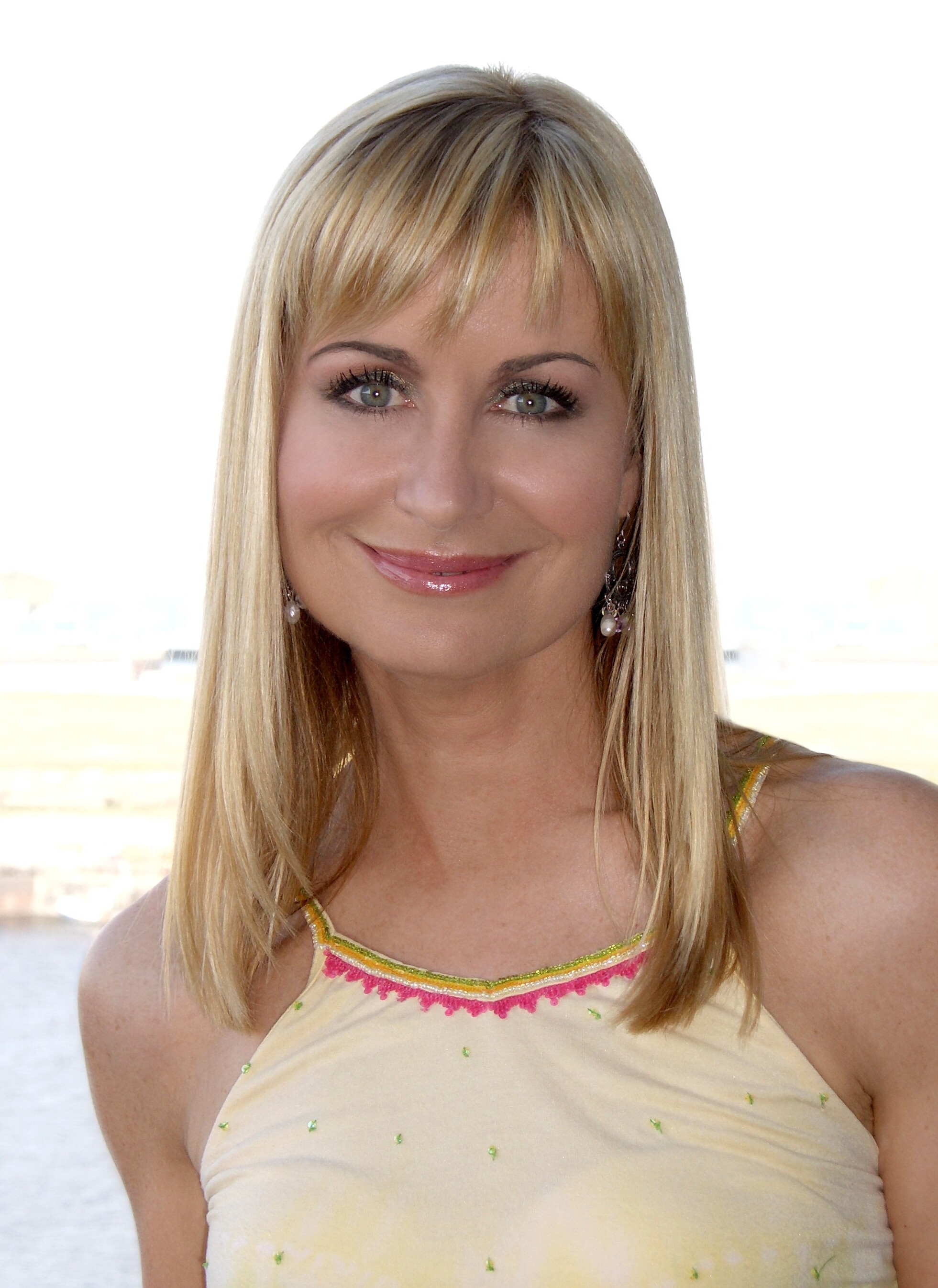
- Lloyd in 2011
- Born: Siân Mary Lloyd; 3 July 1958 (age 68); Maesteg, Glamorgan, Wales
- Education: Cardiff University
- Occupation: Presenter
- Years active: 1982–present
- Known for: S4C presenter ITV Weather presenter
- Spouse: Jonathan Ashman (m. 2007; div. 2015)

Siân Mary Lloyd (born 3 July 1958) is a Welsh television presenter and meteorologist from Maesteg. She was the United Kingdom's longest-serving female weather forecaster, having appeared on ITV Weather for 24 years, from 1990 until 2014.

== Early life and education ==
Lloyd was born in Maesteg, Glamorgan, the daughter of two teachers. She attended Ysgol Gyfun Ystalyfera, and in 1975 performed at the Urdd National Eisteddfod where she won the Crown. She graduated with first-class honours from University College, Cardiff (now Cardiff University), before going on to Jesus College, Oxford, where she began work for a postgraduate BLitt degree in Celtic Studies, but she left after a year without graduating. She has meteorology qualifications from the Met Office College and frequently appears in TV documentaries about the weather.

== Career ==
Lloyd began her media career as a researcher for the BBC Wales Today nightly news programme, having responded to an advert in the media pages of The Guardian. She then became an announcer for S4C. During a themed premiere for the film The Avengers (1998) she dressed in a skin-tight black catsuit, for which she won the prize for best costume.

Whilst working for Worldwide Television News in London, she was asked to work with the Met Office on documentaries about the weather. She then screen tested for the ITV Weather in 1990 and was appointed to a post which had 200 applicants. Lloyd won the Television and Radio Industries Club (TRIC) award for the best TV weather presenter in 2005 and 2007. For a time, she additionally presented ITV News London weather forecasts. In February 2014 she left ITV to "pursue new opportunities".

Proud of being Welsh, she set up SWS (which means "kiss" in Welsh, and standing for "Social, Welsh and Sexy"), a Welsh networking club, in partnership with entertainer Stifyn Parri in the Groucho Club. Bryn Terfel and Siân Phillips are now patrons.

In 2007, Lloyd won the UK Rear of the Year competition, making her the oldest woman to win the title. She also starred as the 'hidden' celebrity in an episode of the CBBC show Hider in the House. Lloyd also helped support Sense, The National Deafblind and Rubella Association, and in 2007 attended the launch of the Fill in the Gaps campaign. In March 2008, Lloyd published her autobiography, entitled A Funny Kind of Love. In Spring 2010, Lloyd presented the first series of Wedding TV's The Great Cake Bake.

Lloyd appeared on ITV's reality television show I'm a Celebrity...Get Me Out of Here!, but was the shock first celebrity to be eliminated by the public vote. She also took part in a celebrity version of the TV show Total Wipeout which aired on 18 September 2010.

Lloyd appeared on Celebrity First Dates in 2015.

== Personal life ==
While at Cardiff University, she met Mark Cavendish, a relative of the Duke and Duchess of Devonshire and now a businessman. They were together for 14 years, often visiting the family seat at Chatsworth House.

From 2002, Lloyd was in a relationship with Lembit Öpik, then the MP for Montgomeryshire, and was engaged to him from 2004 to October 2006. They lived at a house they bought together in Öpik's constituency outside Newtown, Powys, and were due to marry in 2006. They had met at a Liberal Democrats conference session where the press meet the MPs, where they talked and she lost a ring. He found it, then lost it himself, then found it again two years later and called her; she had a spare ticket to go to the Proms, and they began a relationship. She appeared on Celebrity Who Wants To Be A Millionaire? with Öpik on 15 April 2006, winning £64,000 for charity. In December 2006 it was revealed that the relationship had broken down.

Lloyd met motor racing entrepreneur Jonathan Ashman at Secretary of State for Wales Peter Hain's 2007 St David's Day party at the Palace of Westminster. Ashman proposed to Lloyd in December 2007, on holiday, at the foot of Mount Kilimanjaro in Tanzania. Lloyd and Ashman married in 2007 and divorced in 2015 after eight years.

== Career timeline ==
- Cardiff Broadcasting Company (1980–1982)
- BBC Wales Today, researcher (1982–1984)
- Development Board for Rural Wales, press officer (1984–1986)
- S4C, continuity announcer (1986–1988)
- Worldwide TV News (1988–1990)
- ITV Weather (1990–2014)
- How 2 presenter (1997)
- The Apprentice UK (brief appearance in an advert campaign, 2008)
- Churchill Car Insurance advert (as the lady feeding the dog sausages)
