= Tomasz Schafernaker =

Polish-British meteorologist

- Born: 8 January 1979 (age 47); Gdańsk, Poland
- Citizenship: Polish; British
- Education: BSc (Hons) in Meteorology, University of Reading
- Occupation: Meteorologist
- Employer: BBC
- Television: BBC Weather
- Website: tomaszschafernaker.com

Tomasz Schafernaker (born 8 January 1979) is a Polish-British meteorologist and newsreader who currently works for BBC Weather and BBC News Polska.

== Early life ==
Tomasz Schafernaker was born on 8 January 1979 in Gdańsk, Poland, and attended school both in his native Poland and in Britain. He was educated at the independent school St. John's College, Southsea, in Portsmouth, where he took A-levels in mathematics, physics and art, followed by the University of Reading where he gained a BSc (Hons) in Meteorology.

== Career ==
After joining the Met Office, he trained as a meteorologist. He joined the BBC Weather Centre in 2000, working as a broadcast assistant, and became a presenter in the same year; this made him the youngest man to present the BBC Weather. He spent some time giving BBC regional forecasts across the UK, and presented on BBC World during the winter of 2003.

From 2004 until 2005, Schafernaker studied at the Met Office college in Exeter, Devon, and trained as a forecaster for aviation. He also worked for a time at ITV, as well as the London Weather Centre.

Schafernaker rejoined the BBC in 2006. He became famous for raising "the finger" towards, and after a gentle tease from, the BBC news presenter Simon McCoy, in the belief that he was off camera. A clip of his shocked and horrified facial expression has received more than 5.5 million hits on the video sharing website YouTube. After a set of cost-cutting measures and choice of a smaller core of national weather presenters, he was removed from broadcasting on the BBC in 2010. He was later named Best TV Weather Presenter at TRIC Awards 2010.

Still working for the Met Office, Schafernaker presented on various broadcast projects for various UK networks including The Weather Channel, Discovery Channel and Channel Four. On 29 May 2012 he joined BBC South East as a weather presenter, joining the freelance Kaddy Lee-Preston. Schafernaker returned to BBC national broadcasts on 19 January 2013. He normally forecasts on the BBC News Channel, Radio 4 or Radio 5 Live. In 2017 he was voted the most popular weather presenter in the UK in a public poll. He once had to discontinue reading the shipping forecast on Radio 4 as he needed to vomit.

== Magazine modelling ==
Schafernaker modelled for the front cover of Attitude, a British gay magazine, in January 2010 and was again photo featured by them in 2017.

== Personal life ==
Schafernaker lives on his own and lists hobbies as going to the gym and painting. His home is in West London.
