= Helen Willetts =

British meteorologist and badminton player

Helen Willetts (born 28 November 1972 in Chester, Cheshire, England) is a meteorologist on the BBC. She appears regularly on BBC News, BBC World News, BBC Red Button, BBC Radio 4, BBC Radio 5 Live and BBC Radio 2. Willetts is an occasional weather forecaster on the BBC News at Ten on BBC One.

== Early life ==
Willetts was born in Chester, England. She first lived in Buckley, Flintshire. Her father was a gas engineer. She grew up on Bryn Celyn in Upper Colwyn Bay in Wales.

She was educated at Ysgol Eirias (Eirias High School) in Colwyn Bay. She first wanted to be an air hostess. She obtained a first class honours degree in Physics at the University of Nottingham in 1993.

She joined the Met Office in July 1993, to begin a five-month weather forecaster training course at the Met Office College based at the former RAF Shinfield Park. She later worked at Cardiff, appearing on the BBC Wales news.

== Broadcasting career ==
In July 1994, Willetts moved to the Weather Centre in Cardiff. From 1995, she was a forecaster on both BBC Television and BBC Radio in Wales.

In 1997, she joined BBC Weather in London to work for BBC News.

== Awards ==
In March 2006, she was awarded the Television and Radio Industry Club (TRIC) award for best TV weather presenter.

== Personal life ==
Helen played badminton internationally for Wales. She enjoys walking, cycling and travelling.

== Sport ==
In 1983 Willets played badminton for Llandudno Junction Badminton Club, with Victoria Luff. By 1984 she played for the Vardre and Stella Maris clubs in Deganwy. Her sister Emma also played. By 1985 she played for the Wales Under-14 team. By 1987 she played for the Wales Under-16 team, and the county team. With her sister, she played for West Clyde and East Gwynedd. Her parents played competitive badminton as well. By 1991 she played for the University of Nottingham, with Jo Shorrell.
