= Teddy Rosen =

Edward Ezra Rosen
- Born: 1898
- Died: 6 March 1966 (aged 67–68); Hove, England
- Occupations: Electronics manufacturer; businessman
- Known for: Founder of Ultra Electric / Ultra Electronics

Edward Ezra Rosen (1898 – 6 March 1966) was the founder of Ultra Electronics, one of the United Kingdom's largest electronics manufacturers.

== Career ==
Born the son of Rachel and Samuel Rosen, immigrants from Poland, Teddy was educated at the Jews Free School in London He joined Marconi in the Post Office Wireless Department in 1911. During World War I Teddy joined the Royal Flying Corps where he serviced radios. In 1920 he founded Ultra Electric where he was keen on delivering quality radio sets at a reasonable price. He was Chairman of the Radio Manufacturers' Association and served as Chairman of the Television and Radio Industries Club in 1953/54.

He was still Chairman on Ultra Electric (Holdings) Group in 1961 but resigned shortly after the acquisition of the business by Thorn Electrical Industries in October of that year.

In 1960 he became Chairman of the British Technion Society which supports the Israel Institute of Technology. The Institute awarded him an honorary Doctor of Science in Technology in 1966.

In retirement he was still giving talks on his career.

He died on 6 March 1966, in Hove.
