= Mrs Hinch =

British influencer and author (born 1990)

Sophie Rose Hinchliffe
- Born: Sophie Barker; 16 February 1990 (age 36); Basildon, Essex, England
- Other name: Mrs Hinch
- Occupations: Influencer, author
- Years active: 2018–present
- Spouse: Jamie Hinchliffe
- Children: 3
- Website: instagram.com/mrshinchhome

Sophie Rose Hinchliffe (née Barker; born 16 February 1990), known as Mrs Hinch, is a British influencer whose Instagram account features tips for home cleaning. Her cleaning books and her memoir have been included on the Sunday Times Bestseller List.

== Early life ==
Hinchliffe was born Sophie Barker, in Basildon, Essex. Before creating her Instagram account, she was a hairdresser. She stated that she has anxiety, and that cleaning helped her cope with it.

== Career ==
=== Instagram ===
Hinchliffe created her Instagram account, mrshinchhome, in March 2018, initially to show how she and her husband were decorating their house. Within two years, she had accumulated two million followers on the platform, known as Hinchers and by the hashtag #HinchArmy. By June 2019, she had 2.5 million followers, as of October 2020 more than 3.8 million. Her content includes stories and short 15-second videos in which she cleans and organises her home. In March 2021, ratings site GoCompare listed her as the highest-paid 'homefluencer' or 'cleanfluencer' in the United Kingdom, second highest worldwide.

=== Books ===
In April 2019, Hinchliffe's first book, Hinch Yourself Happy, sold 160,302 copies in three days, making it the second highest-selling non-fiction book in the UK at that time. Her second book, The Activity Journal, was released in 2019 and reached number 1 on the Sunday Times Bestseller List. Her third book, The Little Book of Lists, became the number one bestseller in the UK in April 2020, boosted by a surge in interest in cleaning and home care following the introduction of coronavirus lockdown restrictions. In October 2020, her memoir, This Is Me, also became a number 1 bestseller.

In 2023, she published a book, Welcome to Hinch Farm, with illustrations by Hannah George, dealing with the topic of children's anxiety about moving house. Hardback and ebook versions in 2023 were followed by a paperback in 2024.

=== Other media ===
This Morning has featured Mrs Hinch's cleaning tips.

In March 2021, Hinchliffe's podcast, All the Best, was recommended by The Guardian as 'podcast of the week'.

=== Product promotion ===
Hinchliffe's recommendations have caused a surge in sales, such as when a cleaning pad she recommended quickly sold out. In 2019 and March 2023, she was investigated by the Advertising Standards Authority for allegedly failing to make legally required disclosures that product promotions on her Instagram were paid advertisements.

== Personal life ==
Hinchliffe lives in Maldon. She and her husband, Jamie, have three sons: Ronnie, Lennie and Vinnie.

Hinchliffe suffered health problems after a gastric band operation that resulted in her losing eight stone. She was prescribed anti-depressants due to anxiety.

Hinchliffe and her son Ronnie have both been diagnosed as autistic.
