= That Peter Crouch Podcast =

British podcast

- Genre: Entertainment
- Country of origin: United Kingdom
- Language: English

Cast and voices
- Hosted by: Peter Crouch, Chris Stark, Steve Sidwell

Production
- Length: 30-45 minutes

Technical specifications
- Audio format: Podcast (via streaming or downloadable MP3)

Publication
- No. of seasons: 5
- Original release: 19 September 2018
- Provider: Acast

That Peter Crouch Podcast is an entertainment and sports podcast hosted by Peter Crouch, Chris Stark and Steve Sidwell. Ostensibly a guide on how to be a professional footballer, the episodes include insight on everything from dressing rooms, transfers, managers, football confessions and other details of the modern game.

The podcast has been consistently one of the most popular podcasts in the UK since its launch, attracting 12 million listens in 2019.

The podcast started on the BBC but in April 2022 left the broadcaster and made a commercial partnership with Acast.

== Awards ==
The podcast has been well received, winning the 2019 British Podcast Awards Spotlight Award. The judges said That Peter Crouch Podcast, "found a totally new perspective on one of the nation’s most discussed pastimes. Full of wit and personality, this is a podcast that has brought people together, regardless of which club they support." The podcast also won a silver award for the "Best Sports Show" at the 2020 Audio and Radio Industry Awards.

== Series overview ==
Series	Episodes	Originally released	
Series	Episodes	First released	Last released
1	13	19 September 2018	18 December 2018
2	12	20 March 2019	19 June 2019
3	12	31 December 2019	25 March 2020
4	TBA	14 April 2020	TBA

== Episodes ==
=== Season 1 (2018) ===
No.	Title	Length (minutes)	Original release date
1	"That Dressing Rooms Episode"	43:00	19 September 2018
Peter Crouch reveals what goes on in a dressing room full of millionaire footballers.
2	"That Transfers Episode"	48:00	19 September 2018
What do players do to pass the time on Transfer Deadline Day?
3	"That England Episode"	48:00	19 September 2018
From making his debut to refusing to retire, Peter Crouch chats about his England career.
4	"That Nights Out Episode"	48:00	25 September 2018
Peter Crouch takes us behind the velvet rope and into the VIP booth as he reveals what it's really like to go out drinking with a professional footballer.
5	"That Team Bus Episode"	48:00	3 October 2018
From breaking up riots in Africa to troublesome trips in Turkey, Peter Crouch tells us what it’s like for a footballer on a coach.
6	"That Tactics Episode"	48:00	10 October 2018
From crazy formations to bizarre instructions from a manager, Peter Crouch takes us inside the baffling world of tactics and what managers like Rafael Benitez are like in training
7	"That Fashion Episode"	48:00	31 October 2018
We’ve all had our own fashion faux pas – so what were Peter Crouch’s?
8	"That Celebrations Episode"	48:00	7 November 2018
There's more to Crouchy's celebrations than the robot but we will find out how that started too.
9	"That Confessions Episode"	48:00	14 November 2018
Peter Crouch tells us what it’s like when you’re a footballer facing a stadium full of abusing fans plus, how one chant can affect a professional footballer.
10	"That Goalies Episode"	48:00	21 November 2018
The life of a goalkeeper is a strange one, so we've dedicated an episode to those who try and stop Crouch from scoring.
11	"That Kits Episode"	48:00	28 November 2018
As a taller man it's fair to say Crouch has had his struggles with football kits. We'll discover what strips he loved as a youngster and what really goes on at a club kit launch.
12	"That Cars Episode"	48:00	5 December 2018
From the sublime to the ridiculous, Crouch talks Hummers, convertible Renault Meganes and reveals how he became a ‘Master Driver’.
13	"That Samrat Episode"	48:00	18 December 2018
It's the one we've all been waiting for – what a night at the local curry house!

=== Season 2 (2019) ===
No.	Title	Length (minutes)	Original release date
1	"That Houses Episode"	47:00	20 March 2019
Peter Crouch celebrates the start of Series Two by inviting Tom and Chris to his house, aka the Croucho Club.
2	"That Overhead Kicks Episode"	47:00	27 March 2019
Peter, Chris and Tom marvel at the greatest overhead kicks they’ve ever seen.
3	"That Subs Episode"	51:00	3 April 2019
Find out what really happens on a Premier League substitutes’ bench with Peter, Tom and Chris.
4	"That Dreams Episode"	47:00	9 April 2019
Peter, Tom and Chris try to decipher the dreams sent in by listeners.
5	"That TV Episode"	50:00	16 April 2019
Peter, Chris and Tom discuss everything on television; box-sets, pundits and when analysis goes wrong.
6	"That Refs Episode"	48:00	24 April 2019
The identity of the players notorious for buttering up referees is uncovered, and Crouchy reveals whether he would "take contact" to win the World Cup for England.
7	"That Champions League Episode"	43:00	1 May 2019
Nothing is off limits in this episode about big European matches. You'll learn more about the iconic anthem, what footballers pack for a continental trip and go-karting in Spain.
8	"That Training Ground Episode"	45:00	7 May 2019
Peter tells us what it's like on your first day at training with Steven Gerrard at Liverpool. Following that nerve wracking experience, you'll discover why Crouchy is a soup connoisseur, plus what goes on in the manager's office.
8a	"That Week Off"	5:00	14 May 2019
We can't bring our usual podcast, but we can discuss more refs in public and Crouchella...
9	"That Half Time Episode"	46:00	21 May 2019
Peter Crouch takes us inside the dressing room for the most intense fifteen minutes of a match day. Chris and Tom discover the running battle between kitsmen and linesmen, players' toilet etiquette at half time and also learn about the art of 'snapping it off'.
10	"That Fitness Episode"	47:00	28 May 2019
Find out why elite male footballers wear 'sports bras' and all about the strangest pre-season tasks as Peter Crouch tells us what it takes to be at the top of the game.
10a	"That Week Off"	3:00	4 June 2019
Peter Crouch has got some exciting news, and there's an update on Crouch Fest.
11	"That Penalties Episode"	47:00	11 June 2019
Crouchy tells us what it takes to convert a spot-kick under intense pressure, the time he stole on from Gerrard as well as discussing alternatives to aftershoots with Chris and Tom.
12	"That Crouchfest Episode"	57:00	18 June 2019
To the astonishment of all involved, the long-awaited and frequently doubted Crouchfest actually comes to fruition, and in ways no-one could ever imagine.
