= British Podcast Awards =

Annual awards for British podcasting

- Official logo
- Awarded for: The best in British podcasting
- Country: United Kingdom
- Presented by: Haymarket Media Group
- First award: 29 April 2017; 9 years ago
- Website: www.britishpodcastawards.com

The British Podcast Awards is an annual awards ceremony honouring British podcast production. The event is owned and operated by Haymarket Media Group, whose media portfolio includes Campaign and PRWeek.

== History ==
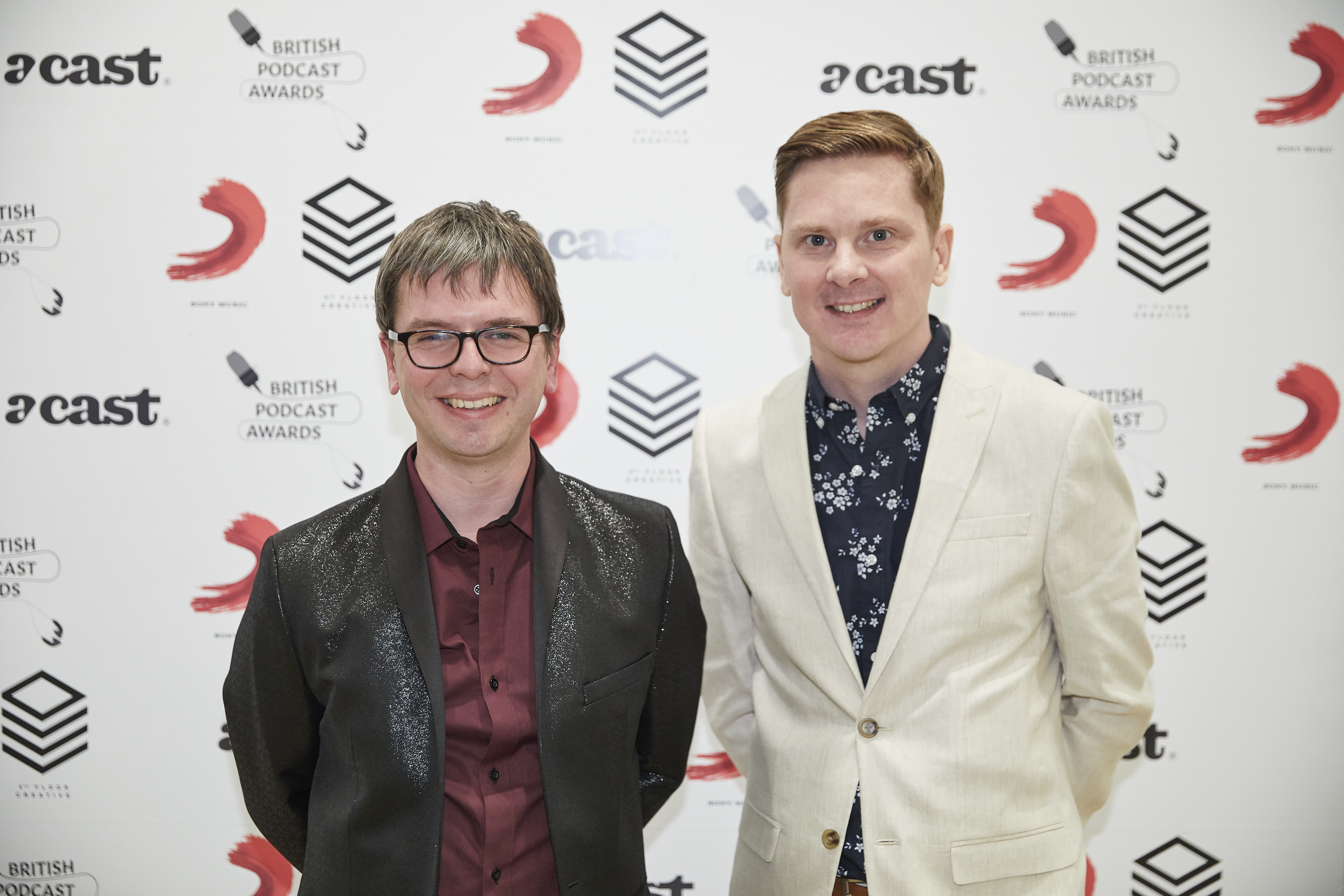
Founders Hill and Deegan at the 2018 awards

The British Podcast Awards was co-founded in 2017 by Matt Hill, managing director of production company Rethink Audio, and Matt Deegan, creative director of audio firm Folder Media. Deegan and Hill assumed control of the Australian Podcast Awards in 2020 and launched the Irish Podcasts Awards in 2021.

In 2022, Podcast Awards Ltd, the operating company behind the awards, was acquired by Haymarket Media Group. The event was integrated into Haymarket Business Media's marketing communications portfolio, with plans to expand podcast events internationally.

PodPod, an industry publication covering the business and production of podcasting that launched in 2022, became the official media partner of the awards in 2023, before management of the ceremony was transferred to Campaign.

== 2017 ==
Chaired by Helen Zaltzman, the judging panel contained more than 50 independent members representing podcast creators, publishers, the press, listeners and audio industry executives. The awards received over 400 entries, spanning genres including TV, film, sport, comedy, true crime, and current affairs. The award ceremony, hosted by Olly Mann, took place in London on 29 April 2017 with presenters including Edith Bowman, Grace Dent, and James Cooper from My Dad Wrote a Porno.

=== 2017 Nominees and Winners ===
Winners in bold

**AudioBoom Podcast of the Year**: **Fathers And Sons – Radio Wolfgang with Mr. Porter**	**Listeners' Choice Award**: **Kermode and Mayo's Film Review – Mark Kermode and Simon Mayo for BBC Sounds**
**Best Branded Content supported by Create**: **Fathers And Sons – Radio Wolfgang with Mr. Porter**; Glyndebourne – Katherine Godfrey and Whistledown Productions; Mountain – Christopher Sleight; The National Trust Gardens Podcast – Fresh Air Productions for The National Trust; Sound Matters – Third Ear and Quincey Sound for B&O Play	**Best Comedy Podcast supported by Podiant**: **Beef and Dairy Network Podcast – Benjamin Partridge**; The Adam Buxton Podcast – Adam Buxton; Do The Right Thing – Fuzz Productions; Richard Herring's Leicester Square Theatre Podcast – Fuzz Productions; The Scummy Mummies Podcast – Scummy Mummies
**Best Current Affairs Podcast**: **The Inquiry – BBC Radio Current Affairs for BBC World Service**; The Economist asks – The Economist; The New Statesman Podcast – New Statesman; ShoutOut – ShoutOut Radio; Weekly Economics Podcast – New Economics Foundation	**Best Entertainment Podcast with Maple Street Studios**: **Hip Hop Saved My Life with Romesh Ranganathan – AudioBoom**; The Distraction Pieces Podcast – Distraction Pieces Network; A Gay & A Non Gay – James Barr and Dan Hudson; Probably True - Scott Flashheart Elliott; Soundtracking – Edith Bowman
**Best Fiction Podcast**: **Tracks – BBC Radio**; Beef and Dairy Network Podcast – Benjamin Partridge; Wooden Overcoats – David K. Barnes, Andy Goddard and John Wakefield for Wooden Overcoats Ltd	**Best Interview Podcast supported by ipDTL**: **Scientists not the Science – Stuart Higgins**; Getting Better Acquainted – Dave Pickering; Shoot First Talk Later: The Photoshoot Podcast – Robert Gershinson; What Goes On Here – Sam Walker
**Best Review Podcast**: **Song by Song – Martin Zaltz Austwick and Sam Pay**; The Penguin Podcast – Somethin' Else for Penguin Random House; Soundtracking – Edith Bowman; Spoiler – Joe Shmo; SRSLY – New Statesman	**Best Sport Podcast**: **Fight Disciples Podcast – Fight Disciples**; The Big Interview With Graham Hunter – Neil White; The Cycling Podcast – Richard Moore, Lionel Birnie and Daniel Friebe; Hornet Heaven – Olly Wicken; How2Wrestling – Podcrabs
**Best True Crime Podcast**: **They Walk Among Us – Benjamin Fitton and Rosanna Fitton**; Body On The Moor – BBC Radio; Untold: the Daniel Morgan Murder – Peter Jukes and Deeivya Meir	**Most Original Podcast**: **Between the Ears – BBC Radio**; Mountain – Christopher Sleight; Weird Tales and the Unexplainable – Bob Shoy
**Best Radio Podcast supported by UK Radioplayer**: **Short Cuts – Falling Tree Productions for BBC Radio**; 50 Things That Changed The Modern Economy – BBC Radio Current Affairs for BBC World Service; Ollie & Si – Ollie Gallant and Simon Alexander for Quidem Radio; Kermode and Mayo's Film Review – Mark Kermode and Simon Mayo for BBC Sounds; Radiomoments Conversations – David Lloyd Media Services	**Best New Podcast supported by the Radio Independents Group**: **The Cinemile – Dave Corkery and Cathy Cullen**; Everyone Else – Eva Krysiak; Say Why To Drugs – Distraction Pieces Network; Soundtracking – Edith Bowman; The Untold – BBC Radio 4
**Smartest Podcast supported by Whistledown Studios**: **Coffee Break Italian – Radio Lingua Network**; Chips With Everything – The Guardian; The National Trust Gardens Podcast – Fresh Air Productions for The National Trust; Scienceish – Radio Wolfgang; Sound Matters – Third Ear and Quincey Sound for B&O Play	**Represent supported by Upload Radio**: **Farmerama – Jo Barratt and Abby Rose**; **Lunar Poetry Podcasts – David Turner**; **Melanin Millennials – The ShoutOut Network**
**Podcast Champion**: **Adam Buxton**

== 2018 ==
The second British Podcast Awards saw the 50-strong judging panel, chaired by Nish Kumar, listening to over 1,000 hours of entries, with new categories created to recognise comedy, family and innovation. The 2018 awards were supported by acast, Radioplayer, Twitter, Muddy Knees Media, Podiant, Whistledown, IPDTL, Hindenburg Systems, Create Productions and Audible and Sony Music’s 4th Floor Creative. The British Podcast Awards also partnered with The Guardian to create a five-part podcast series to showcase the nominees.

The ceremony, hosted again by Olly Mann, took place in London on 19 May 2018 and was attended by some of the biggest names in audio, including Simon Mayo, Mark Kermode, Jake Wood, Fi Glover, Josh Widdicombe and Fearne Cotton. The Listeners' Choice Award, won by Kermode and Mayo's Film Review, saw over 110,000 votes cast by the public.

=== 2018 Nominees and Winners ===
Winners in bold

**Podcast of the Year**: **Griefcast – Cariad Lloyd**	**Listeners' Choice Award**: **Kermode and Mayo's Film Review – Mark Kermode and Simon Mayo for BBC Sounds**
**Best Branded Content supported by Muddy Knees Media**: **The Discovery Adventures – Land Rover**; Irreplaceable: A History of England in 100 Places – Fresh Air Productions for Historic England; Parliament Explained – Fresh Air Productions for UK Parliament; The Penguin Podcast – Somethin' Else for Penguin Random House; Women in Business – NatWest, Pixiu, Acast and ZenithOptimedia	**Best Comedy Podcast supported by Podiant**: **Beef and Dairy Network Podcast – Benjamin Partridge**; A Gay & A Non Gay – James Barr and Dan Hudson; Babysitting Trevor – Dot Dot Dot Productions; The Political Party – Matt Forde; This Paranormal Life – Rory Powers and Kit Grier
**Best Culture Podcast**: **The Two Shot Podcast – Thomas Griffin and Craig Parkinson**; Literary Friction – Carrie Plitt and Octavia Bright; Soundtracking – Edith Bowman; The Invisible College – Cathy FitzGerald for BBC Radio 4; Writer's Routine – Dan Simpson	**Best Current Affairs Podcast**: **The Foreign Desk – Bill Leuty, Joleen Goffin and Andrew Mueller for Monocle**; Brexitcast – BBC News and BBC Radio 5 Live; Reasons To Be Cheerful – Ed Miliband and Geoff Lloyd; Stop and Search – Jason Reed; Weekly Economics Podcast – New Economics Foundation
**Best Entertainment Podcast with Sony Music's 4th Floor Creative**: **Griefcast – Cariad Lloyd**; Nothing To Declare Podcast – Unedited; Probably True – Scott Flashheart; The Butterfly Effect – Jon Ronson; The It's Nice That Podcast – It's Nice That and Radio Wolfgang	**Best Family Podcast**: **Once Upon a Time in Zombieville – Bigmouth Audio for BBC Radio Scotland**; Dirty Mother Pukka – Mother Pukka; Fun Kids Science Weekly – Fun Kids; The Adoption – The World at One for BBC Radio 4; The Discovery Adventures – Land Rover
**Best Fiction Podcast**: **Imaginary Advice – Ross Sutherland**; Blood Culture – Resonance; Five Minute Folklore – Bob Shoy; Once Upon a Time in Zombieville – Bigmouth Audio for BBC Radio Scotland; The Discovery Adventures – Land Rover	**Best Interview Podcast supported by ipDTL**: **Griefcast – Cariad Lloyd**; Homo Sapiens – Will Young and Christopher Sweeney; Perfume Pioneers – Jo Barratt for Somerset House; The Allusionist – Helen Zaltzman; The Comedian's Comedian Podcast – Stuart Goldsmith
**Best Sport Podcast**: **Fight Disciples Podcast – Fight Disciples**; Brian Moore's Full Contact – Brian Moore for Telegraph Media Group; Quickly Kevin, Will He Score? – Chris Scull, Michael Marden and Josh Widdicombe; The Cycling Podcast – Richard Moore, Lionel Birnie and Daniel Friebe; Who Are Ya? – Ben Cartwright and David Cowlishaw	**Best True Crime Podcast**: **The Assassination – Owen Bennett-Jones and Neal Razzell for BBC World Service**; Beyond Reasonable Doubt? – Wisebuddah for BBC Radio 5 Live; Murder Mile – Michael J. Buchanan-Dunne; S'laughter – Lucy and Emma; They Walk Among Us – Benjamin Fitton and Rosanna Fitton
**Most Original Podcast supported by Audible**: **The Discovery Adventures – Land Rover**; Once Upon a Time in Zombieville – Bigmouth Audio for BBC Radio Scotland; Quake – BBC Radio Drama North; Radio Atlas – Eleanor McDowall; The Poetry Exchange – Fiona Lesley Bennett, Michael Shaeffer and Ben Hales	**Best Radio Podcast supported by UK Radioplayer**: **Short Cuts – Falling Tree Productions for BBC Radio 4**; Elis James and John Robins Podcast – Radio X; Fun Kids Science Weekly – Fun Kids; Russell Brand Podcast – Radio X; The Listening Service – Tom Service and The Listening Service Team for BBC Radio 3
**Best New Podcast**: **The Tip Off – Maeve McClenaghan**; Adrift – Geoff Lloyd and Annabel Port; My First Time – Sam Bonham for VICE; Radio Atlas – Eleanor McDowall; Reasons To Be Cheerful – Ed Miliband and Geoff Lloyd	**Smartest Podcast supported by Whistledown Studios**: **The Allusionist – Helen Zaltzman**; Blue Planet II: The Podcast – Emily Knight and Becky Ripley for the BBC; Stop and Search – Jason Reed; That Classical Podcast – Kelly Harlock and Chris Bland; The Tip Off – Maeve McClenaghan
**Represent Award supported by Twitter**: **Carousel Radio – Davot, Fran, Ewan, Jonny and Sam**; I Hear Voices – BBC Radio 1 Newsbeat; Mostly Lit – Alex Reads, Rai and Derek Owusu; Stance Podcast – Chrystal Genesis and Heta Fell; The Backstory - Claire Mutimer and Suzy Coulson	**Podcast Champion**: **Helen Zaltzman**

== 2019 ==
Entering its third year, the 2019 British Podcast Awards saw brand new categories, including acast Moment of the Year, Best Sex and Relationships podcast and the Bullseye Award supported by Podiant, alongside returning categories true crime, entertainment, interview, fiction and current affairs. The Bullseye Award honoured the podcasts that produce exceptional listening experiences for niche audiences and those under-represented in other British media.

On 8 April 2019, the nominations for the British Podcast Awards powered by DAX were streamed live on Twitter, with the podcasting stars of No Such Thing as a Fish revealing the top six podcasts nominated in each of the 15 categories.

The ceremony, hosted by Cariad Lloyd, took place at Kings Place in London on 18 May 2019, with guests and presenters including Michael Sheen, Fearne Cotton, Julia Davis, Vicki Pepperdine, Elizabeth Day, Giovanna Fletcher, Alice Levine, Jane Garvey, Hussain Manawer, Katie Piper and Anna Whitehouse. The ceremony was recorded and available to watch on YouTube 48 hours after the event.

George the Poet, who entered his Have You Heard George's Podcast? declaring under 5,000 listeners per episode, was the stand-out winner of the night, walking away with five awards, including Smartest, Best Arts & Culture, Best Fiction, Best New Podcast, and was named Audioboom's Podcast of the Year. Brexitcast, presented by Laura Kuenssberg, Chris Mason, Katya Adler and Adam Fleming, won the Listeners' Choice award with 190,000 public votes cast.

=== 2019 Nominees and Winners ===
Winners in bold

**AudioBoom Podcast of the Year**: **Have You Heard George's Podcast? – George the Poet**	**BBC Sounds Listeners' Choice Award**: **Brexitcast – BBC News and BBC Radio 5 Live**
**Acast Moment of the Year**: **You, Me and the Big C – BBC Radio 5 Live**; Dear Joan and Jericha – Julia Davis and Vicki Pepperdine with A Hush Ho, Pepperdine Productions and Dot Dot Dot Co-Pro; Have You Heard George's Podcast? – George the Poet; My Dad Wrote a Porno – Jamie Morton, James Cooper and Alice Levine; Over The Bridge Podcast – Bilal, Kway-ku, Patrick and Tom; Ways to Change the World with Krishnan Guru-Murthy – Channel 4 News and ITN	**Bullseye Award supported by Podiant**: **Probably True – Scott Flashheart**; Ask the Nincompoops – Andy Stanton and Carrie Quinlan with Great Big Owl; Centuries of Sound – James Errington; Somerset House Studios – Somerset House Studios; Farmerama – Jo Barratt, Katie Revell and Abby Rose; Cricket Show: Extras – BBC Somerset
**Best Branded Podcast**: **Hot Air – Radio Wolfgang for Selfridges**; Awake at Night – Bethany Bell and Chalk + Blade for the UNHCR; Feminists Don't Wear Pink – Scarlett Curtis for Penguin Random House; Healthy for Men – The River Group for Holland & Barrett; Meet Me at the Museum – Whistledown Productions for Art Fund; Rough Guide to Everywhere – Alannah Chance for Reduced Listening	**Best Arts & Culture Podcast**: **Have You Heard George's Podcast? – George the Poet**; BLANK – Jim Daly and Giles Paley-Phillips; Excuse the Mess – Ben Corrigan; Folk on Foot – Matthew Bannister; How to Fail – Elizabeth Day; Stance Podcast – Chrystal Genesis and Heta Fell
**Best Comedy Podcast supported by Spotify**: **Dear Joan and Jericha – Julia Davis and Vicki Pepperdine with A Hush Ho, Pepperdine Productions and Dot Dot Dot Co-Pro**; Beef and Dairy Network Podcast – Benjamin Partridge; Birthday Girls' House Party – Birthday Girls with Whistledown Productions for BBC Sounds; The All New Angelos and Barry Podcast – Alex Lowe and Dan Skinner for Great Big Owl; The Guilty Feminist – Deborah Frances-White; The Horne Section Podcast – Alex Horne, Joe Auckland, Mark Brown, Will Collier, Ben Reynolds and Ed Sheldrake with Pixiu for Deezer Originals	**Best Current Affairs Podcast**: **The Grenfell Tower Inquiry with Eddie Mair – BBC Sounds**; Beyond Today – BBC Radio 4; Have You Heard George's Podcast? – George the Poet; Stance Podcast – Chrystal Genesis and Heta Fell; The Intelligence – The Economist; Today in Focus – The Guardian
**Best Entertainment Podcast supported by Sony Music's 4th Floor Creative**: **This Paranormal Life – Rory Powers and Kit Grier**; Blood on the Tracks – Colin Murray with Shooting Sharks Productions for BBC Sounds; Desert Island Dicks – Dan Benedictus; Off Menu – Ed Gamble and James Acaster with Plosive Productions; Private Parts – Jamie Laing and Francis Boulle for Spirit Media; Spark True Stories – Elle Scott	**Best Family Podcast**: **Surrogacy: A Family Frontier – Dustin Lance Black, Tracy Williams and Jane Andrews for BBC Radio 5 Live**; Everything Under the Sun – Molly Oldfield; Fun Kids Science Weekly – Fun Kids; Made by Mammas – Create Productions; Ruthie: Me and My Dad – Ruthie Kelner and Martin Kelner with Wireless Studios for talkRADIO; The Long Road to Baby – Sophie Sulehria
**Best Fiction Podcast**: **Have You Heard George's Podcast? – George the Poet**; Calais 2037 – New Time Productions; Double Bubble – Prison Radio Association; The Amelia Project – Philip Thorn and Oystein Brager for Imploding Fictions; The Lovecraft Investigations: The Case of Charles Dexter Ward – Julian Simpson and Sweet Talk Productions for BBC Radio 4; The Offensive – Radio Stakhanov	**Best Interview Podcast**: **The Modern Mann – Olly Mann for Rethink Audio**; Breaking Mum and Dad: The Podcast – Anna Williamson and Create Productions; Declassified – Michael Coates; Homo Sapiens – Will Young and Christopher Sweeney for Banana Stand; How to Fail – Elizabeth Day; Sex Talk – Prison Radio Association
**Best Sex & Relationships Podcast**: **Project Pleasure – Anouszka Tate and Frankie Wells**; #QueerAF – Jamie Wareham and National Student Pride; Qmmunity – Alexis Caught, Kevin Morosky and Christania McPherson; The Receipts Podcast – Audrey Akande, Milena Sanchez and Tolani Shoneye; The Sugar Baby Confessionals – Sara-Mae Tuson for Fable Gazers; Unexpected Fluids – BBC Sounds and BBC Radio 1	**Best Sport Podcast**: **The Totally Football Show with James Richardson – Muddy Knees Media for the Totally Football Network**; F1: Beyond the Grid – Formula One for AudioBoom; LS11 – Darren Harper and Ryan Wilson for Proper Sport; LGBT Sport Podcast – Jack Murley for BBC Radio Jersey; The Big Interview with Graham Hunter – BackPage Media; The Cycling Podcast Féminin – Rose Manley and Orla Chennaoui with The Cycling Podcast
**Best True Crime Podcast**: **Case Notes – Classic FM for Global**; Dead Man Talking – Peter Sale and Alex Hannaford with DMT Media and AudioBoom; Death in Ice Valley – Neil McCarthy and Marit Higraff for BBC World Service and NRK; End of Days – Ciaran Tracey and Chris Warburton for the BBC; RedHanded – Hannah Maguire and Suruthi Bala for Acast; The Doorstep Murder – Fiona Walker for BBC Scotland	**Best Radio Podcast supported by UK Radioplayer**: **Multi Story – BBC Local Radio**; Brexit: A Love Story? – World at One for BBC Radio 4; Fun Kids Science Weekly – Fun Kids; ShoutOut – ShoutOut Radio; Tara and George – Audrey Gillan for Falling Tree Productions; The Chris Moyles Show – Global for Radio X
**Best New Podcast**: **Have You Heard George's Podcast? – George the Poet**; A Mile in My Shoes – Empathy Museum and Loftus Media; About Race with Reni Eddo-Lodge – Reni Eddo-Lodge and Renay Richardson; No Country for Young Women – BBC Sounds; On the Road – Prison Radio Association; Today in Focus – The Guardian	**Smartest Podcast**: **Have You Heard George's Podcast? – George the Poet**; About Race with Reni Eddo-Lodge – Reni Eddo-Lodge and Renay Richardson; On the Road – Prison Radio Association; Shedunnit – Caroline Crampton; The Tip Off – Maeve McClenaghan; The Urbanist – Monocle 24
**Spotlight Award**: **That Peter Crouch Podcast – Peter Crouch and BBC Radio 5 Live for BBC Sounds**; Fortunately... with Fi and Jane – Fi Glover and Jane Garvey for BBC Radio 4; Happy Mum, Happy Baby – Giovanna Fletcher for Pixiu; Happy Place – Fearne Cotton; Katie Piper's Extraordinary People – Katie Piper for Somethin' Else	**Podcast Champion**: **My Dad Wrote a Porno – Jamie Morton, James Cooper and Alice Levine**

== 2020 ==
The 2020 British Podcast Awards, in association with Acast, took place digitally due to COVID-19 restrictions in the UK, with awards taken to winners' doorsteps and a hamper of confetti cannons and treats for all nominees.

The 2020 nominees were chosen from over 1,000 entries by over 50 judges, including the likes of Annie Mac, Katie Piper and Dustin Lance Black, with 2019 big winner George the Poet overseeing the process as chair of the judges. New award categories for 2020 included Best Daily Podcast, Best Live Episode, Best Publisher or Network, Best Wellbeing Podcast and Best Podcast in the Welsh Language.

The ceremony, hosted by Clara Amfo and Rhianna Dhillon, included presenters such as Claudia Winkleman, Louis Theroux, Ian Wright and Mel Giedroyc, and was livestreamed on YouTube on 11 July 2020 and watched by 12,000 viewers at home. The Listeners' Choice Award received over 230,000 votes and was won by Shagged Married Annoyed, presented by Chris and Rosie Ramsey.

The 2020 awards were the first edition to use gold, silver and bronze awards rather than a singular winner for most awards, except for Podcast of the Year and Podcast Champion.

=== 2020 Nominees and Winners ===
Awards with only one winner are marked with a ‡

Award title	Gold	Silver	Bronze	Shortlisted
Podcast of the Year ‡	Brown Girls Do It Too – Poppy Jay and Rubina Pabani for BBC Sounds			Commendation: (Note: While only one winner was allowed for the category, the judges decided to commend Passenger List for its "innovation, writing and high production standards."); Passenger List – Kelly Marie Tran, Goldhawk Productions and Radiotopia
Listeners' Choice Award supported by BBC Sounds	Shagged Married Annoyed – Chris Ramsey and Rosie Ramsey	RedHanded – Hannah Maguire and Suruthi Bala with Wondery	The Anfield Wrap – The Anfield Wrap	Wafflin' – Joe Weller, Theo Baker and Luke Martin Today in Focus – The Guardian Open Goal – Simon Ferry and Paul Slane with Acast The Chris Moyles Show – Chris Moyles with Global for Radio X The Girls Bathroom – Sophia Tuxford and Cinzia Baylis-Zullo with Acast Elis James and John Robins – Elis James and John Robins with Audio Always for BBC Radio 5 Live Happy Hour – Jack "JaackMaate" Dean
Best Arts & Culture Podcast supported by Pod Bible	Rule of Three – Jason Hazeley and Joel Morris with Great Big Owl	Classical Fix – BBC Radio 3	Best Pick – The Spontaneity Shop	Hot Air present State of the Arts – Radio Wolfgang for Selfridges Somerset House Studios – Somerset House Studios Song by Song – Martin Zaltz Austwick and Sam Pay
Best Branded Podcast	The Penguin Podcast – Somethin' Else for Penguin Random House	Meet Me at the Museum – Art Fund	The Rough Guide to Everywhere – Aimee White for Reduced Listening	#QueerAF – Jamie Wareham and National Student Pride DeepMind: The Podcast – Whistledown Productions for DeepMind On the Marie Curie Couch – Marie Curie
Best Business Podcast	Money Talks – The Economist	The Northern Power Women – Northern Power Women for What Goes On Media	Doing It For The Kids – Frankie Tortora and Steve Folland for Doing It For The Kids	Jazz Shapers – Jazz FM for Bauer Media and Mishcon de Reya Squiggly Careers – Helen Tupper and Sarah Ellis Tales of Silicon Valley – The Times and Wireless Studios
Best Comedy Podcast supported by Acast	Kurupt FM – MC Grindah, DJ Beats, Steves Green and Chabuddy G for Audible	Brian & Roger – Dan Renton Skinner and Harry Peacock with Great Big Owl	Dear Joan and Jericha – Julia Davis and Vicki Pepperdine with A Hush Ho, Pepperdine Productions and Dot Dot Dot Co-Pro	Josh Berry's Fake News – Josh Berry for Union JACK Radio Mind Canyon – Charlie Kemp and Steve Dawson Off Menu – Ed Gamble and James Acaster with Plosive Productions
Best Current Affairs Podcast	Today in Focus – The Guardian	The Intelligence – The Economist	Stance Podcast – Chrystal Genesis and Heta Fell	Full Disclosure – James O'Brien for Global The Tortoise Podcast – Tortoise Media The Week Junior Show – Fun Kids and The Week Junior
Best Daily Podcast supported by Podfollow	The Rob Auton Daily Podcast – Rob Auton with Plosive Productions	Today in Focus – The Guardian	Beyond Today – BBC Radio 4	Love Island: The Morning After – Kem Cetinay and Arielle Free for ITV The Globalist – Monocle 24 The Santa Daily – Fun Kids
Best Entertainment Podcast	Something Rhymes with Purple – Somethin' Else	George Ezra & Friends – 4th Floor Creative	Sam Walker's Desert Diaries – Sam Walker	Help I Sexted My Boss – William Hanson and Jordan North with Audio Always No Country For Young Women – BBC Radio 1 and 1Xtra Production for BBC Sounds Off Menu – Ed Gamble and James Acaster with Plosive Productions
Best Family Podcast	Marvellous Musical Podcast – David Walliams for Global	Diddy Pod – Ciaran Murtagh, Andrew Barnett Jones and Steve Ryde for CBBC	The Intended Parent – Fran Simmons and Kreena Dhiman	Breaking Mum & Dad – Anna Williamson Ask the Nincompoops – Andy Stanton and Carrie Quinlan with Great Big Owl The Trap Door – Sophie Black
Best Fiction Podcast	Passenger List – Kelly Marie Tran, Goldhawk Productions and Radiotopia	Fall of the Shah – Steve Waters for BBC World Service	Hag – Thomas Curry, Harriet Poland and Tom Killian for Audible	Brian & Roger – Dan Renton Skinner and Harry Peacock with Great Big Owl Coexistence – Colin Carvalho Burgess and Dominic Nangle with Coex Studios Mockery Manor – Laurence Owen, Hayley Evenett and Lindsay Sharman with Long Cat Media
Best Interview Podcast	Declassified – Michael Coates	Today in Focus – The Guardian	How to Kill An Hour – Marcus Bronzy for Podcast Studio London	Trust Issues: The Infected Blood Scandal – Rachel Botsman Homo Sapiens – Will Young and Christopher Sweeney for Banana Stand Out to Lunch – Jay Rayner with Somethin' Else
Best Live Episode supported by Latitude	Tailenders – Greg James, Felix White and James Anderson for BBC Sounds	Tape Notes – John Kennedy	Blood on the Tracks – Colin Murray with Shooting Sharks Productions for BBC Sounds	Can We Just Ask: Can Anyone Be An Activist? – Annie Clarke and Will Clempner Nobody Panic – Stevie Martin and Tessa Coates with Plosive Productions The Empire Film Podcast – Chris Hewitt, James Dyer and Helen O'Hara with Empire for Bauer Media
Best Network or Publisher supported by 4DC	Somethin' Else	The Athletic	The Guardian	BBC World Service Mags Creative Studio71
Best New Podcast supported by Factory Studios	The Log Books – Adam Zmith, Tash Walker and Shivani Dave	The Last Bohemians – Kate Hutchinson with House of Hutch	Shagged Married Annoyed – Chris Ramsey and Rosie Ramsey	Accentricity – Sadie Ryan Masala Podcast – Sangeeta Pillai for Soul Sutras The IMO Podcast – Chris Thompson and Michelle Browne for The IMO Project
Best Podcast in the Welsh Language Y Podlediad Cymraeg Gorau	Dwy Iaith, Un Ymennydd – Elis James with Alpha for BBC Cymru	Siarad Secs – Astud for BBC Cymru	Yr Haclediad – Bryn Salisbury, Iestyn Lloyd and Sioned Mills	—N/a
Best Radio Podcast	Tunnel 29 – Helena Merriman for BBC Radio 4 and BBC Sounds	The Skewer – Jon Holmes for BBC Radio 4	Ellie and Anna Have Issues – Ellie Taylor and Anna Whitehouse for Global	Kermode and Mayo's Film Review – Mark Kermode and Simon Mayo with Somethin' Else for BBC Radio 5 Live The Chris Moyles Show – Global for Radio X The Santa Daily – Fun Kids
Best Sex & Relationships Podcast	Brown Girls Do It Too – Poppy Jay and Rubina Pabani for BBC Sounds	Masala Podcast – Sangeeta Pillai for Soul Sutras	F**ks Given – Florence Barker and Reed Amber (Come Curious) with Studio71	#QueerAF – Jamie Wareham and National Student Pride Lights On – Angelica Lindsey-Ali for Amaliah The Breakup Monologues – Rosie Wilby
Best Sport Podcast supported by AudioBoom	Football Inside Out: FIFA Women's World Cup 2019 – We Are Grape for COPA90	The Beautiful Brain – Hana Walker-Brown for Audible	The Game Changers – Fearless Women	The Cycling Podcast – Richard Moore, Lionel Birnie and Daniel Friebe The Ex's and O's Podcast – Ex's and O's The Totally Football Show with James Richardson – Muddy Knees Media for the Totally Football Network
Best True Crime Podcast	Paradise – Dan Maudsley for BBC Radio 5 Live and BBC Sounds	The Hurricane Tapes – Steve Crossman and Joel Hammer for BBC World Service	The Bellingcat Podcast: MH17 – Novel	The Last Days of August – Jon Ronson and Lina Misitzis for Audible The Missing Cryptoqueen – Georgia Catt and Jamie Bartlett for BBC Sounds Unheard: The Fred and Rose West Tapes – Howard Sounes with Somethin' Else
Best Wellbeing Podcast	The Sound of Anger – Queen Mary Centre for the History of the Emotions	Hooked: The Unexpected Addicts – Melissa Rice and Jade Wye for BBC Radio 5 Live	Declassified – Michael Coates	GABA – Adam Martin No Really, I'm Fine – Mike Larson and Aaron Metcalf for Reach plc Rainbow Dads – Richard Shannon and Nicholas McInerny
Bullseye Award	Things Unseen: Entombed – CTVC	The Investor's Guide to China – Fidelity International	This Is Spoke – Penguin Random House, Fremantle and BMG	After: Surviving Sexual Assault – Listen Entertainment for BBC Sounds Strong Manchester Women – Vic Elizabeth Turnbull with MIC Media The Offensive – Radio Stakhanov
Creativity Award supported by Audible	Where Is My Mind? – Niall Breslin	Fake Heiress – Vicky Baker and Chloe Moss for BBC Radio 4	Mind Canyon – Charlie Kemp and Steve Dawson	Marvellous Musical Podcast – David Walliams for Global The Skewer – Jon Holmes for BBC Radio 4 The Sound of Anger – Queen Mary Centre for the History of the Emotions
Moment of the Year	Tunnel 29 – Helena Merriman for BBC Radio 4 and BBC Sounds	Ways to Change the World – Channel 4 News	#QueerAF – Jamie Wareham and National Student Pride	Happy Place – Fearne Cotton No Such Thing as a Fish – James Harkin, Andrew Hunter Murray, Anna Ptaszynski and Dan Schreiber (The QI Elves) Richard Herring's Leicester Square Theatre Podcast (RHLSTP) – Richard Herring with Sky Potato, Go Faster Stripe and Fuzz Productions
Podcast Champion ‡	Renay Richardson			—N/a
Smartest Podcast	The Sound of Anger – Queen Mary Centre for the History of the Emotions	Food Actually – Chalk + Blade and Pushkin Industries for Luminary Media	Power Corrupts – Brian Klaas	Tales of Silicon Valley – The Times and Wireless Studios The Listening Service – BBC Radio 3 The Tip Off – Maeve McClenaghan
Spotlight Award	The Guilty Feminist – Deborah Frances-White of The Spontaneity Shop	Happy Mum Happy Baby – Giovanna Fletcher	My Dad Wrote a Porno – Jamie Morton, James Cooper and Alice Levine	Deliciously Ella – Ella Mills with Mags Creative Elis James and John Robins – Elis James and John Robins with Audio Always for BBC Radio 5 Live Table Manners – Jessie Ware

== 2021 ==
In 2021, the British Podcast Awards, now in its fifth year and powered by Amazon Music, announced new categories including Best Lockdown Podcast, Best Documentary Podcast and The International Award for overseas podcasts, suggested by the readers of the Great British Podcasts email newsletter.

The awards took place at the open-air London venue Brockwell Park on 10 July 2021 to reflect the COVID-19 restrictions on large indoor gatherings. Hosted by Jordan North, William Hanson and Poppy Jay, the ceremony also included guest presenters such as Fearne Cotton, Jessie Ware, Oti Mabuse, the hosts of My Dad Wrote A Porno, Vick Hope, Dr Rangan Chatterjee, the hosts of No Such Thing As A Fish and Deborah Frances-White.

Stolen Goodbyes won Best Lockdown Podcast, which tells the stories of those who died from COVID-19 without having the chance to say goodbye. Best New Podcast went to Field Recordings, a podcast transporting listeners to the great outdoors whilst being confined to their own homes.

The only award voted for by the public, the Listeners’ Choice Award saw over 140,000 votes cast. The top spot this year was won by true crime podcast RedHanded, with Podcast Champion awarded to Fearne Cotton to recognise her work in the mental health and wellbeing space. VENT Documentaries, a podcast that shares the formative experiences of young people in the London borough of Brent picked up three awards – Smartest Podcast, Best Documentary and Podcast of the Year.

=== 2021 Nominees and Winners ===
Awards with only one winner are marked with a ‡

Award title	Gold	Silver	Bronze	Shortlisted
Podcast of the Year ‡ supported by Sony Music	VENT Documentaries – Vice UK and Brent 2020			—N/a
BBC Sounds Listeners' Choice Award	RedHanded – Hannah Maguire and Suruthi Bala with Wondery	Shagged Married Annoyed – Chris Ramsey and Rosie Ramsey	Football Weekly – Max Rushden for The Guardian	—N/a
Best Arts & Culture Podcast supported by Create Podcasts	Real Dictators – Paul McGann with Noiser Podcast Network	Shade Podcast – Shade	The Secret Life of Songs – Anthony T. Jackson	Happy Place – Fearne Cotton The Empire Film Podcast – Chris Hewitt, James Dyer and Helen O'Hara with Empire for Bauer Media Transmissions: The Definitive Story of Joy Division and New Order – Joy Division and New Order
Best Branded Podcast supported by Acast Creative	Gardening with the RHS – Royal Horticultural Society	Grilling – Simon Rimmer	Table Manners – Jessie Ware	Military Wives: The Official Film Podcast – Gaby Roslin for Military Wives The Crown Podcast – Netflix The Midpoint – Gabby Logan
Best Business Podcast supported by Wondery	Doing It For The Kids – Frankie Tortora and Steve Folland for Doing It For The Kids	The Diary of a CEO – Steven Bartlett	We Built This City: Greater Manchester – Roland Dransfield	How to Own the Room: Women and the Art of Brilliant Speaking – Viv Groskop Money Maze Podcast – MMP Network The Voiceover Social Podcast – The Voiceover Social
Best Comedy Podcast supported by Stitcher	Kurupt FM – MC Grindah, DJ Beats, Steves Green and Chabuddy G for Audible	SeanceCast – Zoë Tomalin and Charlie Dinkin with Hat Trick Productions	Poppy Hillstead Has Entered The Chat – Poppy Hillstead	Beef and Dairy Network Podcast – Benjamin Partridge Dear Joan and Jericha – Julia Davis and Vicki Pepperdine with A Hush Ho, Pepperdine Productions and Dot Dot Dot Co-Pro Hidden Ireland – Whistledown Productions and Spotify Studios
Best Current Affairs Podcast	Your Broccoli Weekly – Broccoli Productions	The Intelligence – The Economist	Interconnected Voices – Interconnected Voices	Stories of Our Times – David Aaronovitch for The Times Oxfordshire News Podcast – Jack FM Today in Focus – The Guardian
Best Daily Podcast supported by Spotify	The Intelligence – The Economist	The Santa Daily – Fun Kids	Anthems – Broccoli Productions	Stories of Our Times – David Aaronovitch for The Times Today in Focus – The Guardian Wake Up / Wind Down – Niall Breslin
Best Documentary Podcast	VENT Documentaries – Vice UK and Brent 2020	My Mother's Murder – Paul Caruana Galizia, Ceri Thomas, Gary Marshall and Tom Kinsella for Tortoise Media	The Secrets in Us – Georgina Lawton with Loftus Media for Audible	Hometown: A Killing – Mobeen Azhar for BBC Sounds Old School – Ida Schuster with The Big Light Peter 2.0 – Peter Scott-Morgan for Unedited Stories
Best Entertainment Podcast supported by Amazon Music	Stars In Your Ears – Jess Robinson	Perfect Sounds – James Acaster for BBC Sounds	A Gay & A Non Gay – James Barr and Dan Hudson	6 Degrees from Jamie and Spencer – Jamie Laing and Spencer Matthews for BBC Radio 1 and BBC Sounds No Ideas Just Vibes – Lizzie Alli and Ilaria Valaydon Pyke Table Manners – Jessie Ware
Best Family Podcast	Maddie's Sound Explorers – Maddie Moate with Magic Star and 4th Floor Creative	History Storytime – Sophie, Ellie and Mark	World Wise Web – Anna Zanelli for BBC News and BBC World Service	Bottle Ship Adventures – Ben Mullins with Acast Fun Kids Science Weekly – Fun Kids Homeschool History – Greg Jenner for BBC Radio 4
Best Fiction Podcast	This Thing of Darkness – Gaynor Macfarlane and Kirsty Williams with BBC Scotland for BBC Radio 4	Cassie and Corey – Chris Hogg with Acast	Lem N Ginge: The Princess of Kakos – Ell Potter and Mary Higgins with Hotter Project, 45 North and Ellie Keel Productions	DEM TIMES – Rhys Reed-Johnson and Jacob Roberts-Mensah with Our Day Once Upon a Time in Zombieville – Bigmouth Audio for BBC Radio Scotland The Harrowing – Mark Healy and Ben Walker with Storyglass
Best International Podcast supported by Podfront UK	Revisionist History – Malcolm Gladwell	Bunga Bunga – Whitney Cummings with Wondery	How's Work? – Esther Perel	Floodlines – Vann R. Newkirk II for The Atlantic The Daily – The New York Times The Joe Rogan Experience – Joe Rogan
Best Interview Podcast supported by Pod Bible	Dead Honest – Georgie Vestey	Masala Podcast – Sangeeta Pillai for Soul Sutras	Today in Focus – The Guardian	Future Prison – Prison Radio Association The Student Sessions – Tonia Galati Ways to Change the World – Channel 4 News
Best Lockdown Podcast supported by Amazon Music	Stolen Goodbyes – Karen Rice with Acast	Your Work, Your Money – Sean Farrington and Frances Bishop for BBC Radio 5 Live	Mandemic – David "Sideman" Whitely for BBC Radio 1Xtra	Front Room Festivals – Folk on Foot Phone a Friend – George Ezra and Ollie McKendrick-Ness The Mentor – Ric Lewis and David "Sideman" Whitely for Crowd Network
Best Network or Publisher	The Economist	Fun Kids	Plosive Productions	The Athletic BBC World Service Radio Stakhanov
Best New Podcast supported by Audible	Field Recordings – Eleanor McDowall	Prison Bag – Josie Bevan, Rebecca Lloyd-Evans and Alan Hall with Falling Tree Productions for BBC Sounds	Growing Up with gal-dem – Natty Kasambala and Niellah Arboine with gal-dem	Hunting Ghislaine – John Sweeney with Global for LBC Maddie's Sound Explorers – Maddie Moate with Magic Star and 4th Floor Creative VENT Documentaries – Vice UK and Brent 2020
Best Radio Podcast supported by DTS AutoStage	The Skewer – Jon Holmes for BBC Radio 4	Homeschool History – Greg Jenner for BBC Radio 4	Important Broadcast Podcast – Danny Wallace for Radio X	Story Explorers – Fun Kids Slide Into My Podcast – Snoochie Shy, Kaz Crossley and Jordan Hames for BBC Radio 1Xtra The Sista Collective – Jessie Aru-Phillips for BBC Radio 5 Live
Best Sex & Relationships Podcast	Tough Talks – Hits Radio Pride with Bauer Media	Masala Podcast – Sangeeta Pillai for Soul Sutras	Brown Girls Do It Too – Poppy Jay and Rubina Pabani for BBC Sounds	A Gay & A Non Gay – James Barr and Dan Hudson Millennial Love – Olivia Petter for The Independent Sexpots – Katy, Bitsy and Rebecca with Secret Recordings
Best Sport Podcast	GIANT – Owen Blackhurst with Spotify Studios	The High Performance Podcast – Jake Humphrey and Prof. Damian Hughes	F1: Beyond the Grid – Tom Clarkson for Formula One	A Winning Mindset: Lessons from the Paralympics – Andy Stevenson for the International Paralympic Committee and Allianz Coming In from the Cold: The History of Black Footballers in the English Game – Jessica Creighton with Unedited Stories for TalkSPORT Fight Disciples Podcast – Fight Disciples
Best True Crime Podcast	Who Killed CJ Davis? – The Times	Hometown: A Killing – Mobeen Azhar for BBC Sounds	Hope High – BBC Radio 5 Live	Hunting Ghislaine – John Sweeney with Global for LBC The Missing – The Missing + and Podimo for Acast Where is George Gibney? – Mark Horgan for BBC Radio 5 Live and BBC Sounds
Best Wellbeing Podcast	Discovering Dementia – Penny Bell	How Did We Get Here? – Claudia Winkleman and Prof. Tanya Byron with Somethin' Else	Cassie and Corey – Chris Hogg with Acast	How Do You Cope? – Elis James and John Robins for BBC Radio 5 Live Talk Twenties Podcast – Gaby Mendes and Georgia Slater The YUNGBLUD Podcast – Yungblud
Best Welsh Podcast Y Podlediad Cymraeg Gorau	Dewr – Tara Bethan for BBC Radio Cymru	Gwrachod Heddiw – Mari Elen	Clear – Aneirin Karadog and Eurig Salisbury	Nawr yw'r Awr – David Cole and Nia Davies Y Corridor Ansicrwydd – BBC Radio Cymru Y Diflaniad – Wyn Evans for BBC Radio Cymru
Bullseye Award supported by Global	Some Families – Lotte Jeffs and Stu Oakley	The Confidence Fighter – Myrtle Mitchell	Out of Home – Kieran Kenlock, Kwame Wilson, Steven Apampa and Yaf Downes	Bare Naked Politics – Julia Belle Benlunar – Simon Maeder The SwimOut Podcast – Vicki Carter for SwimOut
Creativity Award supported by Audible	Interconnected Voices – Interconnected Voices	Futile Attempts (At Surviving Tomorrow) – Kim Noble	The Power of Sound – Monocle 24	Perfect Sounds – James Acaster for BBC Sounds Probably True – River Scott with Flashheart Digital Tracks: Abyss – Matthew Broughton for BBC Radio 4
Gold Award ‡	Answer Me This! – Helen Zaltzman and Olly Mann			—N/a
Acast Moment of the Year	Where is George Gibney? – Mark Horgan for BBC Radio 5 Live and BBC Sounds	Ways to Change the World – Channel 4 News	Who Shat On The Floor At My Wedding? And Other Crimes – Helen McLaughlin, Karen Whitehouse and Lauren Kilby with Acast	The Divorce Club – Samantha Baines Happy Place – Fearne Cotton The Sandman – Dirk Maggs and Neil Gaiman with Audible
Spotify Podcast Champion ‡	Fearne Cotton			—N/a
Smartest Podcast supported by Podfollow	VENT Documentaries – Vice UK and Brent 2020	Peter 2.0 – Peter Scott-Morgan for Unedited Stories	Maddie's Sound Explorers – Maddie Moate with Magic Star and 4th Floor Creative	Stories of Scotland – Jenny Johnstone and Annie MacDonald The Secret Life of Prisons – Prison Radio Association Windrush Stories – Prison Radio Association
Spotlight Award supported by Global	Grounded with Louis Theroux – Louis Theroux for BBC Radio 4	The YUNGBLUD Podcast – Yungblud	French & Saunders: Titting About – Dawn French and Jennifer Saunders for Audible	Alan Partridge: From the Oasthouse – Steve Coogan for Audible Happy Mum, Happy Baby – Giovanna Fletcher The Isolation Tapes – Elis James and John Robins for BBC Radio 5 Live

== 2022 ==
More than 250 nominees in over 30 categories made the shortlist for the 2022 British Podcast Awards. The judging panel, chaired by Emily Maitlis and Jon Sopel, listened to 319 hours of podcasts from over 1,200 entries. The ceremony, held on 23 July 2022 at Kennington Park in London, was hosted by Elis James and John Robins, alongside Pandora Sykes, Jamie Laing, the hosts of My Dad Wrote a Porno, Idris and Sabrina Elba, Poppy Jay, Jon Sopel, the hosts of RedHanded and Tolani Shoneye and Dr Rupy of The Receipts.

The Podcast Champion award was awarded to the BBC podcast You, Me and the Big C. The award honoured the work of the late Dame Deborah James who had died a month prior, her colleague Rachael Bland who had died in 2018, Bland's husband Steve who had taken her place on the podcast and their colleague Lauren Mahon, whose podcast has contributed to public awareness and perception of cancer and cancer treatment.

BBC World Service podcast Dear Daughter won Best Family Podcast and the Podcast of the Year award. Dear Daughter hears letters written to daughters from around the world, which are often described by listeners as inspiring, poignant and funny.

The only award voted for by the public, the Listeners’ Choice Award, was won by the true-crime podcast RedHanded for the second year in a row.

=== 2022 Nominees and Winners ===
Awards with only one winner are marked with a ‡, posthumous awards are marked with a †.

Award title	Gold	Silver	Bronze	Shortlisted
Podcast of the Year ‡ supported by Audible	Dear Daughter – Namulanta Kombo for BBC World Service			—N/a
Listeners' Choice Award supported by Acast+	RedHanded – Hannah Maguire and Suruthi Bala with Wondery	Elis James and John Robins – Elis James and John Robins with Audio Always for BBC Radio 5 Live	Real Life Ghost Stories – Daniel Issitt † and Emma Ozenbrook	Uncanny – Danny Robins with Bafflegab Productions and Uncanny Media for BBC Radio 4 Chasin' the Racin' – Dom Herbertson, Josh Corner, Joe Akroyd and Christian Iddon
Best Arts & Culture Podcast supported by Pod Bible	Perfect Sounds – James Acaster for BBC Sounds	Legends Fall in the Making – BBC Studios for BBC Radio 1Xtra	Activity Quest – Fun Kids	+44 Podcast – Zeze Millz and David "Sideman" Whitely with So Incredible for Amazon Music Beauty Fix – Naomi Shimada for BBC Sounds FT Weekend – Financial Times Have You Heard George's Podcast? – George the Poet LPO Offstage – Tandem Productions for the London Philharmonic Orchestra Short History of... – Noiser Podcast Network Talk Art – Russell Tovey and Robert Diament
Best Branded Podcast	Forced to Flee – Anita Rani, Waqas Chughtai, Shirley Camia, Barney Thompson for UNHCR	Youth Rising – Somethin' Else for National Citizen Service	Lives on the Lines – Katharine Kerr with Fresh Air Productions for Greater Anglia	Behind The Rings – Fresh Air Productions for Audi UK LSE IQ – London School of Economics Department of Management Puppy Podcast – John Brown for Pets at Home Basement Sessions – Red Bull The Global Safety Podcast – Fresh Air Productions for Lloyd's Register Foundation Radio Times Podcast – Caroline Frost and Shem Law with Immediate Media for the Radio Times You're on Mute – June Sarpong, Bianca Miller-Cole and Michael Hastings for the Black Business Institute
Best Business Podcast supported by Subly	Money Talks – The Economist	Ninetwentynine – Listen for Fiverr	Money Clinic – Financial Times	Being Freelance – Steve Folland Off The Agenda – Sir Charles Bowman and Edwin Danso with Acast Social Minds – SocialChain Tales from the Tannoy – Sayer Hamilton The Little Questions – Apella Advisors REALWORK – Fleur Emery for REALWORK We Built This City: Greater Manchester – Roland Dransfield
Best Comedy Podcast supported by Amazon Music	Spooky Shit – Jamali Maddix with Novel for Audible	This is Gay – Kirk Flash	Cold Case Crime Cuts – Jon Holmes with UNUSUAL Productions for Auddy	Come Into My Kitchen – Ralph Jones and Daniel Nils Roberts Drunk Women Solving Crime – Hannah George, Taylor Glenn and Catie Wilkins with Audio Always and Acast My Dad Wrote a Porno – Jamie Morton, James Cooper and Alice Levine The Skewer – Jon Holmes for BBC Radio 4 The Staff Room Podcast – Harry Stachini This is Gay – Kirk Flash This Paranormal Life – Rory Powers and Kit Grier Mulvenna French & Saunders: Titting About – Dawn French and Jennifer Saunders for Audible
Best Commercial Campaign	Money Talks – Acast Creative for Klarna	Comfort Eating – Grace Dent for The Guardian	Ed Sheeran's +−=÷× Tour – Fun Kids	—N/a
Best Current Affairs Podcast	Media Storm – Mathilda Mallinson and Helena Wadia with House of the Guilty Feminist and Acast	The Intelligence – The Economist	The Slow Newscast – Matt Russell, Ceri Thomas and Basia Cummings for Tortoise Media	Death by Conspiracy? – Marianna Spring for BBC Radio 4 File on 4 Investigates – BBC Radio 4 The Big Steal – Gavin Esler with Fresh Air Productions The Foreign Desk – Andrew Mueller for Monocle 24 The Week Junior Show – Fun Kids and The Week Junior Today in Focus – The Guardian Westminster Insider – Whistledown Productions for Politico Europe
Best Daily Podcast	Everyday Positivity – Kate Cocker for Volley	COP26 Daily – Cameron Angus Mackay for The Big Light	Today in Focus – The Guardian	History Hit – Dan Snow for History Hit Shot & Chaser – Somethin' Else for Spotify The Intelligence – The Economist The Monocle Daily – Monocle 24 The Santa Daily – Fun Kids The Teamsheet – Audio Always for Spotify Wake Up / Wind Down – Niall Breslin
Best Documentary Podcast	Bias Diagnosis – Whistledown Productions for Audible	Harsh Reality: The Story of Miriam Rivera – Trace Lysette for Wondery	Have You Heard George's Podcast? – George the Poet	Brixton: Flames on the Frontline – Big Narstie for BBC Radio 5 Live Freshwater Five – The Guardian I'm Not A Monster – Josh Baker and Joe Kent with BBC Panorama and PBS Frontline for BBC Sounds Lecker: A Food Podcast – Lucy Dearlove for Lecker Kitchens Sweet Bobby – Claudia Williams, Gary Marshall, Basia Cummings, Alexi Mostrous and Karla Patella for Tortoise Media The Coming Storm – Gabriel Gatehouse for BBC Radio 4 We Were Always Here – Hana Walker-Brown for Broccoli Productions
Best Entertainment Podcast supported by Create Podcasts	Decode – Kayo Chingonyi with Reduced Listening for Spotify	Feast is Feast – Big Zuu for Global	Shagged Married Annoyed – Chris Ramsey and Rosie Ramsey	British Scandal – Alice Levine and Matt Forde with Wondery for Audible Desert Island Dicks – James Deacon Elis James and John Robins – Elis James and John Robins with Audio Always for BBC Radio 5 Live Nul Points – Laura Cress and Martyn Williams Pressed – Mariam Musa and Adeola Patronne for BBC Radio 1Xtra The Down Low – Bernie Abambi and Ess You're Dead to Me – Greg Jenner for BBC Radio 4
Best Family Podcast	Dear Daughter – Namulanta Kombo for BBC World Service	Super Great Kids' Stories – Kim Normanton and David Smith with Wardour Studios	Armchair Adventures – Made by Mortals	Bedtime Stories – Audio Always for Dreams Bottle Ship Adventures – Ben Mullins with Acast The Confidence Fighter – Myrtle Mitchell Dadvengers – Nigel Clarke with The London Podcast Company Koko Sleep – Sleep with Sleepiest Mother of All Solutions – Laura Broderick Operation Ouch! The Podcast of Everything – Dr Chris van Tulleken and Dr Xand van Tulleken with Maverick Television for CBBC
Best Fiction Podcast	Soundworlds – Paige Eakin Young (Note: Credited as Patrick Eakin Young; Young came out as non-binary and changed her name in 2023.)	Fully Amplified – Futures Theatre	Atlantic: A Scottish Story – Noisemaker with The Big Light	Earth Eclipsed – The Lunar Company for Apollo Podcasts Ignite Climate Shorts – Fierce Green Productions King Frank and the Knights of the Eco Quest – Soundscape Productions for Fun Kids The Ballad of Anne & Mary – Lindsay Sharman and Laurence Owen (Long Cat Media) The Magnus Archives – Jonathan Sims and Alexander J. Newall for Rusty Quill The Silt Verses – Jon Ware and Muna Hussen with Eskew Productions Wooden Overcoats – David K. Barnes, Andy Goddard and John Wakefield for Wooden Overcoats Ltd
Best Interview Podcast supported by Podfollow	Stories of Our Times – David Aaronovitch for The Times	Tales from the Tannoy – Sayer Hamilton	Masala Podcast – Sangeeta Pillai for Soul Sutras	A Gay & A Non Gay – James Barr and Dan Hudson Chinese Chippy Girl – Georgie Ma with Acast Coupledom – Idris Elba and Sabrina Dhowre Elba for Audible Distraction Pieces Podcast – Scroobius Pip Full Disclosure – James O'Brien for Global The Secret Life of Prisons – Prison Radio Association We Are Black Journos – We Are Black Journos
Best Live Podcast	The Empire Film Podcast – Chris Hewitt, James Dyer and Helen O'Hara with Empire for Bauer Media	Nobody Panic – Stevie Martin and Tessa Coates with Plosive Productions	The Guilty Feminist – Deborah Frances-White of The Spontaneity Shop	Bad People – Dr Julia Shaw and Sofie Hagen for BBC Sounds Cabinet of Jazz – Marcus Brigstocke with Bauer Media and Loftus Media for Jazz FM Drunk Women Solving Crime – Hannah George, Taylor Glenn and Catie Wilkins with Audio Always and Acast Girls On Film – Anna Smith and Hedda Archbold Off Menu – Ed Gamble and James Acaster with Plosive Productions Pappy's Flatshare Slamdown – Ben Clark, Matthew Crosby and Tom Parry The Moon Under Water – Robbie Knox with Audio Always
Best Marketing Campaign	Exactly. – Florence Given for Sony Music Entertainment	Anthems – Broccoli Productions	Sweet Bobby – Claudia Williams, Gary Marshall, Basia Cummings, Alexi Mostrous and Karla Patella for Tortoise Media	—N/a
Best New Podcast	Outcast UK – Graeme Smith	Decode – Kayo Chingonyi with Reduced Listening for Spotify	Ignite Climate Shorts – Fierce Green Productions	Call Me Mother – Shon Faye with Novel MUBI Podcast – Rico Gagliano for MUBI Off The Beaten Jack – Jack Boswell Promenade – The Shift Podcast Network Teach Me a Lesson – Greg James and Bella Mackie with Banana Stand for BBC Sounds The Way We Are – Munroe Bergdorf with Mags Creative for Spotify Yours Sincerely – Jess Phillips with Audio Always
Best Network or Publisher	Mags Creative	Stak	BBC Radio 5 Live	Audio Always BBC World Service Financial Times Fun Kids History Hit Noiser Podcast Network The Athletic
Best Radio Podcast	Our Journey – Miranda Rae and Sound Women South West	A Wish for Afghanistan – Lyse Doucet for BBC World Service	The Great Post Office Trial – Nick Wallis with Whistledown Productions for BBC Radio 4	Homeschool History – Greg Jenner for BBC Radio 4 Legends Fall in the Making – BBC Studios for BBC Radio 1Xtra Room 5 – Helena Merriman for BBC Radio 4 and BBC Sounds Skin Tings – Skin with Bauer Media for Absolute Radio The Santa Daily – Fun Kids The Skewer – Jon Holmes for BBC Radio 4 Uncanny – Danny Robins with Uncanny Media and Bafflegab Productions for BBC Radio 4
Best Sales Team	Fresh Air Productions	Adelicious	Message Heard Sales Team	—N/a
Best Sex & Relationships Podcast	Assume Nothing: Rape Trial – Sarah Mole and Andy Martin for BBC Northern Ireland	A Gay & A Non Gay – James Barr and Dan Hudson	The Divorce Social – Samantha Baines	F**ks Given – Florence Barker and Reed Amber (Come Curious) with Studio71 Homo Sapiens – Will Young and Christopher Sweeney for Banana Stand Life of Bi: A Slippery History of Bisexuality – Ell Potter and Mary Higgins Millennial Love – Olivia Petter for The Independent The Meaningful Life – Andrew G. Marshall The Receipts – Audrey Akande, Milena Sanchez and Tolani Shoneye for Spotify The Sexual Wellness Sessions – Kate Moyle
Best Sport Podcast	The Fake Paralympians – Dan Pepper for BBC World Service	The Football Ramble – Stak for Amazon Music	Fight of the Century: Ali v Frazier – Nas with TBI Media for BBC Radio 5 Live	F1: Beyond the Grid – AudioBoom for Formula One Following On – Steve Harmison and Neil Manthorp for TalkSPORT My Love Letter to Wrestling – Mark Andrews for BBC Cymru Wales and BBC Sounds Race F1 Podcast – The Race Media for The Athletic Tailenders – Greg James, Felix White and James Anderson for BBC Sounds The Official Manchester United Podcast – Sam Homewood, Helen Evans and David May with Audio Always for Manchester United F.C. The Teamsheet – Audio Always for Spotify
Best True Crime Podcast supported by Wondery	The Catch: The Real Freshwater Five Story – Raphael Rowe with Message Heard Productions for Audible	Wild Crimes – Whistledown Productions for the Natural History Museum	The Northern Bank Job – Glenn Patterson with BBC Northern Ireland for BBC Radio 4	American Vigilante – Sam Walker for Crowd Network Bad Cops – Jessica Lussenhop for BBC World Service The Battersea Poltergeist – Danny Robins with Bafflegab Productions for BBC Radio 4 Seventeen Years: The Andrew Malkinson Story – Emily Dugan with Stories of our Times for The Times Sweet Bobby – Claudia Williams, Gary Marshall, Basia Cummings, Alexi Mostrous and Karla Patella for Tortoise Media The Lazarus Heist – Geoff White and Jean Lee for BBC World Service Who Killed Emma? – Sam Poling and Mona McAlinden for BBC Scotland
Best Wellbeing Podcast supported by Audible	Effin' Hormones – Helen Brown, Emma Goswell, Terri Sweeney and Beena Khetani	Manatomy – Danny Wallace, Phil Hilton and Joe Attewell	Declassified – Michael Coates	Built to Thrive – Dr Rangan Chatterjee for Wondery Happy Place – Fearne Cotton Homo Sapiens – Will Young and Christopher Sweeney for Banana Stand Self Care Club – Lauren Mishcon and Nicole Goodman The ADHD Women's Wellbeing Podcast – Kate Moryoussef The Merry Menopause Bookclub – Jo Fuller Yours Sincerely – Jess Phillips with Audio Always
Best Welsh Podcast Y Podlediad Cymraeg Gorau	Gwrachod Heddiw – Mari Elen	Siarad Secs – Lisa Angharad for BBC Radio Cymru	Cwîns – Mari Beard and Meilir Rhys Williams	Probcast – Hollie Smith, Mared Jarman, Amber Davies and Beth Frazer for S4C Sgwrsio – Nick Yeo
Bullseye Award	And Then Came Breast Cancer – Victoria Derbyshire with Factory Originals and 6Foot6 Productions for Future Dreams	Getting Emotional – Bex Lindsay for Acast	History Storytime – Sophie, Ellie and Mark	Jobs of the Future – Jimmy McLoughlin OBE Locked Up Living – Naomi Murphy and David Jones Making Conversations Count – Wendy Ann Harris with Podknows Productions Song by Song – Martin Zaltz Austwick and Sam Pay Talk Twenties Podcast – Gaby Mendes and Georgia Slater The Proper Mental Podcast – Tom Davies Ysbeidiau Heulog – Llwyd Owen and Leigh Jones
Climate Award	Get Birding – Sean Bean with Peanut and Crumb for Get Birding	The Long Time Academy – Ella Saltmarshe with Scenery Studios for The Long Time Project and Headspace	Chattin' Shit to Save the Planet – Allan 'Seapa' Mustafa and Hugo Chegwin with MrBox and Chailor Wade Productions	Common Threads – Ruth MacGilp and Alice Cruickshank Great Green Questions – Juliet Davenport with Mags Creative for Good Energy Ignite Climate Shorts – Fierce Green Productions Ocean Matters – Helen Czerski with Fresh Air Productions for The Bertarelli Foundation The Climate Question – Graihagh Jackson for BBC World Service The SpaceShip Earth Podcast – Dan Burgess for The SpaceShip Earth Which? Investigates – Greg Foot for Which?
Creativity Award supported by Audible	Have You Heard George's Podcast? – George the Poet	Soundworlds – Paige Eakin Young (Note: Credited as Patrick Eakin Young; Young came out as non-binary and changed her name in 2023.)	Operation Ouch! The Podcast of Everything – Dr Chris van Tulleken and Dr Xand van Tulleken with Maverick Television for CBBC	A Life More Wild – Canopy & Stars Assume Nothing: Rape Trial – Sarah Mole and Andy Martin for BBC Northern Ireland Neutrinowatch – Martin Zaltz Austwick and Jeff Emtman Stories of Our Times – David Aaronovitch for The Times The Bias Diagnosis – Ivan Beckley, Emma Barnaby, Yero Timi-Biu, Anishka Sharma and Tej Adeleye with Whistledown Productions for Audible The Flock – A Ton of Feathers The Rez – Lance Dann and Martin Spinelli with Rezilience and Gen-Z Media for Wondery
Audio UK Moment of the Year	Coiled – Leanne Alie and Sylvie Carlos	Chinese Chippy Girl – Georgie Ma with Acast	Masala Podcast – Sangeeta Pillai for Soul Sutras	+44 Podcast – Zeze Millz and David "Sideman" Whitely with So Incredible for Amazon Music Happy Place – Fearne Cotton Shagged Married Annoyed – Chris Ramsey and Rosie Ramsey Sweet Bobby – Claudia Williams, Gary Marshall, Basia Cummings, Alexi Mostrous and Karla Patella for Tortoise Media The Intelligence – The Economist The Missing – Pandora Sykes for What's The Story? and Podimo for Amazon Music Things Fell Apart – Jon Ronson for BBC Radio 4
Podcast Champion ‡	You, Me and the Big C – Deborah James †, Lauren Mahon, Rachael Bland † and Steve Bland for BBC Radio 5 Live			—N/a
BBC Sounds Rising Star Award	Kirk Flash	Meera Kumar	DJ Flight	Amy Richards Cara McGoogan Ella Saltmarshe Georgie Ma Marianna Spring Michael Safi Shivani Dave
Smartest Podcast	Decode – Kayo Chingonyi with Reduced Listening for Spotify	Have You Heard George's Podcast? – George the Poet	The Unfiltered History Tour – VICE World News	Lecker: A Food Podcast – Lucy Dearlove for Lecker Kitchens Edwardian Secrets – Stephen Fry with Testbed Productions for Audible Queer Icons – Tan France with 7digital for Audible Teach Me a Lesson – Greg James and Bella Mackie with Banana Stand for BBC Sounds The Tip Off – Maeve McClenaghan Year '21 – Tara Mills and Declan Harvey for BBC Northern Ireland
Spotlight Award	British Scandal – Alice Levine and Matt Forde with Wondery for Audible	Fairy Meadow – Jon Kay for BBC Radio 4	Rose and Rosie: Parental Guidance – Rose Ellen Dix and Rosie Spaughton with BBC Studios for Spotify	Bad Women – Pushkin Industries Newscast – BBC News Off Menu – Ed Gamble and James Acaster with Plosive Productions Real Dictators – Paul McGann with Noiser Podcast Network Short History of... – Noiser Podcast Network The Foreign Desk – Andrew Mueller for Monocle 24 The High Performance Podcast – Jake Humphrey and Prof. Damian Hughes

== 2023 ==
Entries opened in January 2023 for the seventh British Podcast Awards which returned in September that year, in partnership with PodPod.

The ceremony took place on 28 September 2023 at Outernet London and was attended by around 500 figures from the podcasting industry. The event was hosted by Zoe Lyons and Stephen Bailey, comedians and co-hosts of the Let's Talk About the Husband podcast. Partners for the event included BBC Sounds, Global, Audible, Amazon Music, Wondery and Nomono, with each sponsoring a different category.

Judges from 2023's British Podcast Awards received over 1,000 submissions across 22 categories. The Podcast of the Year award was chosen by the judges from the Gold winners and went to A Positive Life: HIV from Terrence Higgins to Today produced by Overcoat Media for BBC Sounds and narrated by Sam Smith on the stories of people in the UK with HIV over the last 40 years. The podcast also won Best Factual Podcast.

The Listener's Choice Award, which received over 232,000 votes from podcast fans, went to true crime podcast RedHanded for the third consecutive year. Podcast Champion – which honours a podcast that has changed the landscape of the medium and made a real impact – went to Vogue Williams and Joanne McNally for their hit podcast My Therapist Ghosted Me.

=== 2023 Nominees and Winners ===
Awards with only one winner are marked with a ‡, and posthumous awards are marked with a †.

Award title	Gold	Silver	Bronze	Shortlisted
Editors' Choice awards
Podcast of the Year ‡	A Positive Life: HIV from Terrence Higgins to Today – Sam Smith with Overcoat Media for BBC Radio Wales			Commendation: (Note: While only one winner was allowed for the category, the judges decided to "highly commend" The Skewer.); The Skewer – Jon Holmes for BBC Radio 4
Hall of Fame ‡	My Dad Wrote a Porno – Jamie Morton, James Cooper and Alice Levine			—N/a
Podcast Champion ‡	My Therapist Ghosted Me – Vogue Williams and Joanne McNally with Global			—N/a
Specialist Award ‡	Persevering: Grief As Told By Young People – Let's Talk About Loss			Commendation: (Note: While only one winner was allowed for the category, the judges decided to "highly commend" Life After Prison.); Life After Prison – National Prison Radio Shortlisted: Masala Podcast – Sangeeta Pillai for Soul Sutras Rainbow Dads – Richard Shannon and Nicholas McInerny The Rest Room – Natasha Lipman The Shelina Show – Shelina Zahra Janmohamed for Global
Spotlight Award ‡	Partygate: The Inside Story – Paul Brand and Nathan Lee for ITV News			Off Menu – Ed Gamble and James Acaster with Plosive Productions That Peter Crouch Podcast – Peter Crouch and BBC Radio 5 Live for BBC Sounds The News Agents – Emily Maitlis, Jon Sopel and Lewis Goodall for Global Ukrainecast – Victoria Derbyshire and Vitaly Shevchenko for BBC News Where There's A Will, There's A Wake – Kathy Burke with Somethin' Else for Sony Music Entertainment
Publicly voted awards
Listeners' Choice Award ‡	RedHanded – Hannah Maguire and Suruthi Bala with Wondery			Help I Sexted My Boss – William Hanson and Jordan North Live, Laugh, Love – Mark Hoyle and Roxanne Hoyle Staying Relevant – Sam Thompson and Pete Wicks The Girls Bathroom – Sophia Tuxford and Cinzia Baylis-Zullo with Acast
Genre awards
Best Arts & Culture Podcast	Time & Again – Jack Suddaby for Switchback	Firecrotch & Normcore: a Succession Podcast – Sara Barron and Geoff Lloyd	Inside the World of Ralph & Katie – Leon Harrop and Sarah Gordy with Audio Always for BBC Sounds	Classical Fix – BBC Radio 3 Folk on Foot – Matthew Bannister Who Robs a Banksy? – Jake Warren and Bea Duncan with Message Heard Productions and Podimo
Best Business Podcast	The Third Angle – Paul Haimes for PTC	Behind the Money – Financial Times	Walk Tall – Toni Tone for Carolina Herrera	How to Own the Room – Viv Groskop Money Talks – The Economist Rethink Moments – Rachel Botsman with LinkedIn The Big Green Money Show – Deborah Meaden for BBC Radio 5 Live
Best Climate Podcast	Buried – Dan Ashby and Lucy Taylor with Smoke Trail Productions for BBC Radio 4	Blossom Trees and Burnt Out Cars – Talia Randall for BBC Sounds	Burn Wild – Leah Sottile and Georgia Catt for BBC Radio 5 Live	As the Season Turns – Lia Leendertz for Ffern The Conversation Weekly – Gemma Ware for The Conversation Waterlands – Megan McCubbin for Wildfowl & Wetlands Trust
Best Comedy Podcast	The Skewer – Jon Holmes for BBC Radio 4	Alan Partridge: From the Oasthouse – Steve Coogan for Audible	Bang On It – Michelle de Swarte and Laura Smyth for BBC Radio 4	Elis James and John Robins – Elis James and John Robins with Audio Always for BBC Radio 5 Live Sports Horn – Mark Davison and Anthony Richardson (The Exploding Heads) with Stak French & Saunders: Titting About – Dawn French and Jennifer Saunders for Audible
Best Documentary Podcast	Pig Iron – Basia Cummings, Ceri Thomas, Gary Marshall, Karla Patella and Tom Kinsella for Tortoise Media	I'm Not A Monster: The Shamima Begum Story – Josh Baker and Joe Kent with BBC Panorama and PBS Frontline for BBC Sounds	A Very British Cult – Catrin Nye for BBC Radio 4	Acid Dream: The Great LSD Plot – Rhys Ifans, Tim Price and James Robinson for BBC Radio Wales Burn Wild – Leah Sottile and Georgia Catt for BBC Radio 5 Live Call Bethel – Katherine Rushton for The Telegraph
Best Entertainment Podcast	Elis James and John Robins – Elis James and John Robins with Audio Always for BBC Radio 5 Live	Help I Sexted My Boss – William Hanson and Jordan North	British Scandal – Alice Levine and Matt Forde with Wondery for Audible	Eureka! – Rick Edwards and Dr Michael Brooks with Stak NearlyWeds – Sophie Habboo and Jamie Laing with JamPot Originals Richard Herring's Leicester Square Theatre Podcast (RHLSTP) – Richard Herring with Sky Potato, Go Faster Stripe and Fuzz Productions Three Little Words – John Bishop and Tony Pitts with Folding Pocket Productions French & Saunders: Titting About – Dawn French and Jennifer Saunders for Audible
Best Factual Podcast	A Positive Life: HIV from Terrence Higgins to Today – Sam Smith with Overcoat Media for BBC Radio Wales	You, Me and the Big C – Deborah James †, Lauren Mahon, Rachael Bland † and Steve Bland for BBC Radio 5 Live	Partygate: The Inside Story – Paul Brand and Nathan Lee for ITV News	Babbage – Alok Jha for The Economist Gangster: The Story of John Palmer – Livvy Haydock, Patrick Kiteley and Mick Tucker for BBC Radio 5 Live Life After Prison – National Prison Radio
Best Fiction Podcast	Wooden Overcoats – David K. Barnes, Andy Goddard and John Wakefield for Wooden Overcoats Ltd	The Electricity of Every Living Thing – Katherine May	One Five Seven Years – Marietta Kirkbride and Nicolas Jackson with Afonica Productions for BBC Radio 4	Eliza: A Robot Story – Ella Watts and Emma Hickman with Crowd Network Productions for Manchester Women's Aid Oliver Twist – Sam Mendes for Audible The System – Ben Lewis and Kirsty Williams for BBC Scotland
Best History Podcast	Sounds of Black Britain – Julie Adenuga for The Black Curriculum	National Trust Podcast – The National Trust	British Scandal – Alice Levine and Matt Forde with Wondery for Audible	History Hit – Dan Snow for History Hit Short History of... – Noiser Podcast Network
Best Kids Podcast	Super Great Kids' Stories – Kim Normanton and David Smith with Wardour Studios	Audiomoves at the Zoo – Charlie Hendren, Daphna Attias and Bridie Donaghy with Peut-Être Theatre and London Zoo	The Rez – Lance Dann and Martin Spinelli with Rezilience and Gen-Z Media for Wondery	Dragonfly Tales – Emily Hanna-Grazebrook Everything Under the Sun – Molly Oldfield In the Beginning – Lucia Scazzocchio and Hawa Khan for Fun Kids My Life – Fun Kids
Best News & Current Affairs Podcast	Today in Focus – The Guardian	I'm Not A Monster: The Shamima Begum Story – Josh Baker and Joe Kent with BBC Panorama and PBS Frontline for BBC Sounds	The News Agents – Emily Maitlis, Jon Sopel and Lewis Goodall for Global	1Xtra Talks – Richie Brave for BBC Radio 1Xtra Partygate: The Inside Story – Paul Brand and Nathan Lee for ITV News Putin – Jonny Dymond for BBC Radio 4 The Tavistock: Inside the gender clinic – Polly Curtis, Katie Gunning, Jasper Corbett and Tom Kinsella for Tortoise Media
Best Parenting Podcast	Dad Still Standing – Matt Dearsley and Liam Preston	Truth Be Told: Adoption Stories – Bengo Media for Welsh National Adoption Service	Dirty Mother Pukka – Mother Pukka	Dadvengers – Nigel Clarke with The London Podcast Company My First Five Years – Jennie Johnson MBE and Alistair Bryce-Clegg SENDcast – Dale Pickles
Best Sex & Relationships Podcast	Later Dater – Lucy Cavendish with Aurra Studios	Brown Girls Do It Too – Poppy Jay and Rubina Pabani for BBC Sounds	Rainbow Dads – Richard Shannon and Nicholas McInerny	1Xtra Talks – Richie Brave for BBC Radio 1Xtra Pressed – Mariam Musa and Adeola Patronne for BBC Radio 1Xtra The Breakup Monologues – Rosie Wilby The Divorce Social – Samantha Baines
Best Sport Podcast	The Tennis Podcast – David Law, Catherine Whitaker and Matthew Roberts with The Telegraph	Kammy & Ben's Proper Football Podcast – Chris Kamara and Ben Shephard for BBC Radio 5 Live	The Footballer's Football Podcast – Michail Antonio and Callum Wilson for BBC Radio 5 Live	Powerplay: The House of Sepp Blatter – David Morrissey for BBC Radio 5 Live Snookered – Des Clarke and Amy Matthews for BBC Sounds Sports Horn – Mark Davison and Anthony Richardson (The Exploding Heads) with Stak
Best True Crime Podcast	Who Killed Daphne? – Stephen Grey with Wondery for Audible	I'm Not A Monster: The Shamima Begum Story – Josh Baker and Joe Kent with BBC Panorama and PBS Frontline for BBC Sounds	Please Protect Abraham – Sam Holder and Anishka Sharma with Whistledown Productions for BBC Radio 4	Can I Tell You a Secret? – The Guardian Love, Janessa – Hannah Ajala with Antica Productions and Telltale Industries for BBC World Service and CBC Podcasts Vishal – Suchin Mehrotra and Satiyesh Manoharajah for BBC Sounds
Best Wellbeing Podcast	Go Love Yourself – Laura Adlington and Lauren Smith with Crowd Network Productions	Time & Again – Jack Suddaby for Switchback	Stopping To Notice – Miranda Keeling with Fresh Air Productions	Declassified – Michael Coates Fierce Minds Kind Hearts – Ashley Cain with Pixiu Productions Persevering: Grief As Told By Young People – Let's Talk About Loss The Rest Room – Natasha Lipman
General awards
Best Daily Podcast	The News Agents – Emily Maitlis, Jon Sopel and Lewis Goodall for Global	Today in Focus – The Guardian	Stories of Our Times – David Aaronovitch for The Times	History Hit – Dan Snow for History Hit FT News Briefing – Financial Times Sky News Daily – Niall Paterson for Sky News Today in History – The Retrospectors (Olly Mann, Rebecca Messina and Arion McNicoll)
Best Interview Podcast	Different – Nicky Campbell with Audio Always for BBC Radio 5 Live	Where's Home Really? – Jimi Famurewa, Tayo Popoola and Aidan Judd with Podimo and Listen Productions	Masala Podcast – Sangeeta Pillai for Soul Sutras	Girls On Film – Anna Smith and Hedda Archbold Life Changing – Dr Sian Williams for BBC Radio 4 Richard Herring's Leicester Square Theatre Podcast (RHLSTP) – Richard Herring with Sky Potato, Go Faster Stripe and Fuzz Productions
Best Network or Publisher	The Economist	History Hit	Noiser Podcast Network	BBC World Service British Forces Broadcasting Service (BFBS) Financial Times
Best New Podcast	28ish Days Later – India Rakusen and Ellie Sans with Listen Productions for BBC Radio 4	Black Earth – Marion Atieno Osieyo, Elliott Roche, Caz Watson and Shanice da Costa for Black Earth	Where Are You Going? – Catherine Carr with Loftus Media	Lights Out – Falling Tree Productions for BBC Radio 4 The Rabbit Hole Detectives – Rev. Richard Coles, Dr. Cat Jarman and Charles Spencer Ukrainecast – Victoria Derbyshire and Vitaly Shevchenko for BBC News
Best Welsh Language Podcast Y Podlediad Cymraeg Gorau	Cwîns – Mari Beard and Meilir Rhys Williams	Yr Hen Iaith – Jerry Hunter and Richard Wyn Jones with Mimosa Cymru	Sgwrsio – Nick Yeo	Probcast – Hollie Smith, Mared Jarman, Amber Davies and Beth Frazer for S4C Sgorio – Dylan Ebenezer, Sioned Dafydd and Nicky John for S4C
People and teams awards
Rising Star Award	Chanté Joseph	Hannah Ajala	Talia Augustidis	Dr. Kate Lister Jordan Schwarzenberger Sam Tyler

== 2024 ==
The ceremony, hosted by Marcus Brigstocke, took place on 26 September 2024 at Outernet London. Category presenters included Rylan Clark and Scott Mills, Annie Mac, Olivia Atwood, Emily Maitlis, Jon Sopel and Lewis Goodall of The News Agents, Joanne McNally, William Hanson and Jordan North of Help I Sexted My Boss, and Hilary and Michael Whitehall.

Dr. Clare Bailey Mosley accepted the Hall of Fame award on behalf of her late husband, Dr. Michael Mosley, host of the BBC Radio 4 podcast Just One Thing.

=== 2024 Nominees and Winners ===
Awards with only one winner are marked with a ‡, posthumous awards are marked with a †.

Award title	Gold	Silver	Bronze	Shortlisted
Editors' Choice awards
Podcast of the Year ‡	Press Play, Turn On – Amelia Lander-Cavallo, Leeanne Coyle and Adam Zmith with Whistledown Productions for Audible			Commendation: (Note: While only one winner was allowed for the category, the judges decided to "highly commend" Have You Heard George's Podcast?); Have You Heard George's Podcast? – George the Poet
Hall of Fame ‡	Just One Thing – Dr. Michael Mosley † for BBC Radio 4			—N/a
Podcast Champion ‡	The Rest Is Politics – Alastair Campbell and Rory Stewart with Goalhanger Podcasts			—N/a
Specialist Award ‡	Sacred Money – Taqwa Sadiq for BBC Sounds			Commendation: (Note: While only one winner was allowed for the category, the judges decided to "highly commend" Life After Prison.); Life After Prison – National Prison Radio Shortlisted: Dadvengers – Nigel Clarke with The London Podcast Company Masala Podcast – Sangeeta Pillai for Soul Sutras Mel, Mal, Jal: Dal i Siarad – Melanie Owen, Mali Ann Rees and Jalisa Andrews for BBC Radio Cymru
Spotlight Award ‡	The News Agents – Emily Maitlis, Jon Sopel and Lewis Goodall for Global			Commendation: (Note: While only one winner was allowed for the category, the judges decided to "highly commend" Today in Focus.); Today in Focus – The Guardian Shortlisted: Help I Sexted My Boss – William Hanson and Jordan North The High Performance Podcast – Jake Humphrey and Prof. Damian Hughes Miss Me? – Lily Allen and Miquita Oliver with Persephonica Productions for BBC Sounds The Traitors: Uncloaked – Ed Gamble for BBC Sounds Where There's A Will, There's A Wake – Kathy Burke with Somethin' Else for Sony Music Entertainment
Publicly voted awards
Listeners' Choice Award ‡	Help I Sexted My Boss – William Hanson and Jordan North			Shagged Married Annoyed – Chris Ramsey and Rosie Ramsey Sherlock & Co. – Joel Emery and Adam Jarrell with Holy Smokes Audio and Goalhanger Podcasts Shxts n Gigs – James Duncan and Fuhad Dawodu Staying Relevant – Sam Thompson and Pete Wicks The Socially Distant Sports Bar – Elis James, Mike Bubbins and Steff Garrero with Nata Media
Genre awards
Best Arts & Culture Podcast	Legend: The Joni Mitchell Story – Jesca Hoop, Mair Bosworth and Eliza Lomas for BBC Radio 4	Sidetracked – Annie Mac and Nick Grimshaw for BBC Sounds	Intersections: Detroit – Jessica Care Moore and LaToya Cross for A Human Atlas	Folk on Foot – Matthew Bannister Kermode and Mayo's Take – Mark Kermode and Simon Mayo for Sony Music Entertainment MUBI Podcast – Rico Gagliano for MUBI Offstage: Inside The X Factor – Chi Chi Izundu, Rob Brown, Jo Adnitt, Lucy Burns and Joe Kent for BBC Radio 4 Terribly Famous – Anna Leong Brophy and Emily Lloyd-Saini for Wondery
Best Business Podcast	Good Bad Billionaire – Simon Jack and Zing Tsjeng for BBC World Service	Sacred Money – Taqwa Sadiq for BBC Sounds	The Third Angle – Paul Haimes for PTC	Daybreak Europe – Caroline Hepker, Stephen Carroll, Anna Edwards and Tom Mackenzie for Bloomberg Radio Boss Class – Andrew Palmer for The Economist Mission Responsible – Dr. Shini Somara and Dr. Simon Clark for RS DesignSpark The Factory Next Door – Steve Duke
Best Climate Podcast	Get Birding – Sean Bean with Peanut and Crumb for Get Birding	The Water We Swim In – Tilly Robinson	Oceans: Life Under Water – Hannah Stitfall with Crowd Network Productions for Greenpeace	Black Gold – George Powell and Louise Clarke with Long Form Audio Productions for BBC Sounds Mission Responsible – Dr. Shini Somara and Dr. Simon Clark for RS DesignSpark Our Broken Planet – Tori Herridge and Khalil Thirlaway for Natural History Museum Saving Planet Earth – James Stewart with Audio Always Waterlands – Megan McCubbin for Wildfowl & Wetlands Trust
Best Comedy Podcast	Alan Partridge: From the Oasthouse – Steve Coogan for Audible	The Skewer – Jon Holmes for BBC Radio 4	Where There's A Will, There's A Wake – Kathy Burke with Somethin' Else for Sony Music Entertainment	Educating Daisy – Daisy May Cooper for Audible Help I Sexted My Boss – William Hanson and Jordan North Springleaf – James Acaster with Lyndsay Fenner and Mighty Bunny Productions The Guilty Feminist – Deborah Frances-White of The Spontaneity Shop Joanne McNally Investigates: Who Replaced Avril Lavigne? – Joanne McNally for BBC Sounds and CBC
Best Documentary Podcast	Blood on the Dance Floor – Jordan Dunbar with Paul Grant and Craig Boardman for BBC Radio 4	Poison – James Beal for The Times	Short Cuts – Josie Long with Falling Tree Productions for BBC Radio 4	Believe in Magic – Jamie Bartlett for BBC Sounds Black Box: The Hunt for ClothOff – Michael Safi with Manisha Ganguly, Phil McMahon, Andrew Roth, Oliver Laughland, Kateryna Malofieieva, Yanina Sorokina and Alex Atack for The Guardian Bloodlines – Poonam Taneja with BBC Asian Network for BBC Sounds and CBC The Gatekeepers – Jamie Bartlett for BBC Radio 4 The Girlfriends – Carole Fisher with Novel for iHeart True Crime
Best Entertainment Podcast	Miss Me? – Lily Allen and Miquita Oliver with Persephonica Productions for BBC Sounds	Terribly Famous – Anna Leong Brophy and Emily Lloyd-Saini for Wondery	The Guilty Feminist – Deborah Frances-White of The Spontaneity Shop	A Life More Wild – Canopy & Stars Help I Sexted My Boss – William Hanson and Jordan North This Paranormal Life – Rory Powers and Kit Grier Mulvenna Where There's A Will, There's A Wake – Kathy Burke with Somethin' Else for Sony Music Entertainment
Best Factual Podcast	Have You Heard George's Podcast? – George the Poet	Things Fell Apart – Jon Ronson for BBC Radio 4	Black and Blue: Behind the Badge – Michael Morrison and Seren Jones with Blanchard House for CuriousCast Discovery	Babbage – Alok Jha for The Economist Black Box: The Hunt for ClothOff – Michael Safi with Manisha Ganguly, Phil McMahon, Andrew Roth, Oliver Laughland, Kateryna Malofieieva, Yanina Sorokina and Alex Atack for The Guardian Bloodlines – Poonam Taneja with BBC Asian Network for BBC Sounds and CBC Uncharted – Hannah Fry for BBC Radio 4 We Can Be Weirdos – Dan Schreiber with Global
Best Fiction Podcast	Badger and The Blitz – Fun Kids	George Orwell's 1984 – Joe White and Destiny Ekaragha for Audible	The Dial-Up – Philip Catherwood for Podomedy	Koreaboo – Shenee Howard with GOT7 for Audible People Who Knew Me – Daniella Isaacs, Kim Hooper and Joshua Buckingham with Merman Productions for BBC Radio 5 Live Sherlock & Co. – Joel Emery and Adam Jarrell with Holy Smokes Audio and Goalhanger Podcasts Undertow: The Sisters – Brett Neichin with Goldhawk Productions and LightsOut for Realm There's Something I Need to Tell You – John Scott Dryden, Misha Kawnel and Emma Hearn with Goldhawk Productions for BBC Radio 4
Best History Podcast	Weird in the Wade – Natalie Doig	Have You Heard George's Podcast? – George the Poet	Witch – India Rakusen with Lucy Dearlove and Storyglass Productions for BBC Radio 4	Blood on the Dance Floor – Jordan Dunbar with Paul Grant and Craig Boardman for BBC Radio 4 The Curious History of Your Home – Ruth Goodman for Noiser Podcast Network The Gatekeepers – Jamie Bartlett for BBC Radio 4 Three Million – Kavita Puri for BBC Radio 4
Best Kids Podcast	Badger and The Blitz – Fun Kids	Koala Moon: Kids Bedtime Stories & Meditations – Koko Sleep and Starglow Media	Hanes Mawr Cymru – Llinos Mai with Llinos Jones and Terrier Productions for BBC Radio Cymru	Armchair Adventures – Made by Mortals Bust or Trust: A Kids' Mystery Podcast – Small Wardour Checkpoint Kids Bedtime Stories – Checkpoint Magazine Shelly & The Can-Do Kids – Josie and Jemma with Acast
Best News & Current Affairs Podcast	The News Agents – Emily Maitlis, Jon Sopel and Lewis Goodall for Global	The Great Post Office Trial – Nick Wallis with Whistledown Productions for BBC Radio 4	Why Do You Hate Me? – Marianna Spring for BBC News	A Muslim & A Jew Go There – Sayeeda Warsi and David Baddiel with Instinct Productions Bloodlines – Poonam Taneja with BBC Asian Network for BBC Sounds and CBC Poison – James Beal for The Times
Best Parenting Podcast	Child – India Rakusen with Ellie Sans and Listen Productions for BBC Radio 4	Tiny Huge Decisions – America Public Media	Parentline NI - Your Guide to Parenting – Children in Northern Ireland	Dadvengers – Nigel Clarke with The London Podcast Company Made By Mammas: The Podcast – Zoe Hardman and Georgia Dayton with Audio Always Motherkind – Zoe Blaskey Origin Stories: Familyhood – The Leakey Foundation
Best Sex & Relationships Podcast	Press Play, Turn On – Amelia Lander-Cavallo, Leeanne Coyle and Adam Zmith with Whistledown Productions for Audible	It's Not You, It's Them... But It Might Be You – LalalaLetMeExplain for Sony Music Entertainment	The Gossip Gays – Billy Andrew and Sam Morris	A Gay & A Non Gay – James Barr and Dan Hudson It Can't Just Be Me – Anna Richardson with Audio Always and Podimo The Girls Bathroom – Sophia Tuxford and Cinzia Baylis-Zullo with Acast The Real Sex Education – Diggory Waite and Cate Campbell with Hat Trick Podcasts
Best Sport Podcast	The Athletic FC – Ayo Akinwolere for The Athletic	F1: Back at Base – Joseph Fiennes, Holly Samos and Sarah Holt with IMG Productions for BBC Radio 5 Live and Formula One	The Sports Agents – Gabby Logan and Mark Chapman for Global	The High Performance Podcast – Jake Humphrey and Prof. Damian Hughes It's All Kicking Off! – Chris Sutton and Ian Ladyman for the Daily Mail Tailenders – Greg James, Felix White and James Anderson for BBC Sounds The Rest Is Football – Alan Shearer, Gary Lineker and Micah Richards for Goalhanger Podcasts
Best True Crime Podcast	Blood on the Dance Floor – Jordan Dunbar with Paul Grant and Craig Boardman for BBC Radio 4	World of Secrets: The Disciples – Charlie Northcott, Yemisi Adegoke, Helen Spooner and Rob Byrne for BBC World Service	The Missing Madonna – Olivia Graham for BBC Radio Scotland	Gangster: The Story of the Burger Bar Boys – Livvy Haydock with Hayley Mortimer and Patrick Kiteley for BBC Radio 5 Live Ghost Story – Tristan Redman with Pineapple Street Studios and Wondery for Audible The Crossbow Killer – Tim Hinman and Meic Parry for BBC Radio Wales The Price of Paradise – Alice Levine with Wondery for Audible White Smoke: America's Chemsex Killer – Patrick Strudwick with Whistledown Productions for Audible
Best Wellbeing Podcast	And Then Came Breast Cancer – Victoria Derbyshire with Factory Originals and 6Foot6 Productions for Future Dreams	Self Care Club – Lauren Mishcon and Nicole Goodman	The Poodcast – Evie Killip and Claudia Campbell	The HIV Podcast – Sarah Macadam and Jessica Harding for TVPS The Mid•Point – Gabby Logan The Waffle Shop – Taylor James Who We Are Now – Izzy Hammond and Richard Hammond for Global You're Wrong About ADHD – Katie Breathwick and Sam Pittis for Global
Best Welsh Language Podcast Y Podlediad Cymraeg Gorau	Hanes Mawr Cymru – Llinos Mai with Llinos Jones and Terrier Productions for BBC Radio Cymru	Gwreichion – Ioan Wyn Evans for BBC Radio Cymru	Sgwrsio – Nick Yeo	Mel, Mal, Jal: Dal i Siarad – Melanie Owen, Mali Ann Rees and Jalisa Andrews for BBC Radio Cymru Sgorio – Dylan Ebenezer, Sioned Dafydd and Nicky John for S4C
Format awards
Best Daily Podcast	The Rob Auton Daily Podcast – Rob Auton with Plosive Productions	What in the World – BBC World Service	The Intelligence – The Economist	Men in Blazers: Early Kick-Off – Wondery for Men in Blazers Newscast – BBC News The Daily Football Briefing – The Athletic The Story – Manveen Rana and Luke Jones for The Times Today in Focus – The Guardian
Best Interview Podcast	The Hidden 20% – Ben Branson for The Hidden 20%	Believe in People – Matthew Butler for ReNew and Change Grow Live	Life After Prison – Prison Radio Association	Changes – Annie Mac Comfort Eating – Grace Dent for The Guardian Deep Hidden Meaning Radio – Nile Rodgers for Apple Music Masala Podcast – Sangeeta Pillai for Soul Sutras Rosebud – Gyles Brandreth with Plain Jaine Media
Best New Podcast	Three Million – Kavita Puri for BBC Radio 4	The Hidden 20% – Ben Branson for The Hidden 20%	So Wrong It's Right – Olivia Attwood with Bauer Media and Listen Productions	A Muslim & A Jew Go There – Sayeeda Warsi and David Baddiel with Instinct Productions Check One Two: The Lowdown on Testicular Cancer – Cahonas Child – India Rakusen with Ellie Sans and Listen Productions for BBC Radio 4 Educating Daisy – Daisy May Cooper for Audible Sherlock & Co. – Joel Emery and Adam Jarrell with Holy Smokes Audio and Goalhanger Podcasts The Water We Swim In – Tilly Robinson
People and teams awards
Best Host(s)	Marianna Spring	William Hanson and Jordan North	Megan McCubbin	Dan Snow Gabby Logan and Mark Chapman James Peak and Steph Warren
Best Network or Publisher	Tortoise Media	Wondery	Fun Kids	Audible BBC World Service Koala Kids Noiser Podcast Network Financial Times
Rising Star Award	Emily Esson	Kwesia X (City Girl In Nature)	Nadia Mehdi	Bella Neale Rob Burrow † Taqwa Sadiq

== 2025 ==
The nominees for the 2025 British Podcast Awards were announced on 24 July 2025. That same day, voting for the Listeners' Choice Award opened, which ran until 29 August. The ceremony took place on 2 October 2025 in the Indigo at The O2 in London, hosted by comedian Maisie Adam.

The Podcast of the Year award, selected from a pool of all other Gold winners, went to Audible original podcast Kill List, hosted by tech journalist and author Carl Miller. The Listeners' Choice Award, as voted by the public, went to Betwixt The Sheets: The History of Sex, Scandal & Society, hosted by Dr. Kate Lister and produced by Dan Snow's History Hit.

=== 2025 Nominees and Winners ===
Awards with only one winner are marked with a ‡, posthumous awards are marked with a †.

Award title	Gold	Silver	Bronze	Shortlisted
Editors' Choice awards
Podcast of the Year ‡	Kill List – Carl Miller with Novel for Audible			Commendation: (Note: While only one winner was allowed for the category, the judges decided to "highly commend" Cold Tapes.); Cold Tapes – Alexis Zegerman, Jonathan Myerson, Siân Fox and Polly Frame for BBC Sounds
Specialist Award ‡	The Guernsey Deportees – Ollie Guillou and Phillippa Guillou for Channel Islands Podcasts			Life After Prison – National Prison Radio My Life with Dementia – Kola Bokinni with Arlie Adlington for Dementia UK On the Side of Humanity – Tatyana Movshevich with Eli Block for Amnesty International RadioTherapy – Julie Cain Sing It Pink – Aunt Nell Productions for The Pink Singers Still Parents Podcast – Matt Whitehouse, Ryan Jackson and Dan Kelly
Spotlight Award ‡	The Traitors: Uncloaked – Ed Gamble for BBC Sounds			Yoto Daily – Jake Harris for Yoto Elis James and John Robins – Elis James and John Robins with Audio Always for BBC Radio 5 Live Miss Me? – Lily Allen and Miquita Oliver with Persephonica Productions for BBC Sounds Stalked – Carole Cadwalladr and Hannah Mossman Moore with Rob Byrne and Georgia Catt for BBC Sounds The News Agents – Emily Maitlis, Jon Sopel and Lewis Goodall for Global Titanic: Ship of Dreams – Paul McGann with Duncan Barrett and Miriam Baines for Noiser Podcast Network Today in Focus – The Guardian
Publicly voted awards
Listeners' Choice Award ‡	Betwixt The Sheets: The History of Sex, Scandal & Society – Dr. Kate Lister for History Hit			After Dark: Myths, Misdeeds & the Paranormal – Anthony Delaney and Maddy Pelling for History Hit Elis James and John Robins – Elis James and John Robins with Audio Always for BBC Radio 5 Live The Running Channel Podcast – Rick Kelsey, Andy Baddeley and Sarah Hartley for the Running Channel The Socially Distant Sports Bar – Elis James, Mike Bubbins and Steff Garrero with Nata Media Uncanny – Danny Robins with Bafflegab Productions and Uncanny Media for BBC Radio 4
Genre awards
Best Arts & Culture Podcast	Sonic Fields – Sam Tyler	Artworks: The Lost Archives of James Baldwin – Tony Phillips for BBC Radio 4	Soul Music – BBC Radio 4	Notable: Facing The Music – Hannah Dean, Leonie Thomas, Gareth Ceredig, Katie Hill and Barney Rowntree with Overcoat Media Productions for BBC Radio 3 Folk on Foot – Matthew Bannister Intersections: Los Angeles – Chicana Artivista Martha Gonzalez for A Human Atlas
Best Business Podcast	Wedding Pros Who are Ready to Grow – Becca Pountney	The Factory Next Door – Steve Duke	Grounded: A Climate Startup Journey – Tom Previte for Restord	Money Talks – The Economist Daybreak Europe – Caroline Hepker, Stephen Carroll, Anna Edwards and Tom Mackenzie for Bloomberg Radio The Third Angle – Paul Haimes for PTC The Times Tech Podcast – Danny Fortson and Katie Prescott for The Times
Best Comedy Podcast	Elis James and John Robins – Elis James and John Robins with Audio Always for BBC Radio 5 Live	This Paranormal Life – Rory Powers and Kit Grier Mulvenna	Help I Sexted My Boss – William Hanson and Jordan North	Sound Heap – John-Luke Roberts and Ed Morrish with Maximum Fun The Skewer – Jon Holmes for BBC Radio 4 Where There's A Will, There's A Wake – Mel Giedroyc with Somethin' Else for Sony Music Entertainment
Best Documentary Podcast	Disclosure Investigates: Dead Man Running – BBC Radio Scotland	The Trapped – Daniel Hewitt for ITV News	Stalked – Carole Cadwalladr and Hannah Mossman Moore with Rob Byrne and Georgia Catt for BBC Sounds	Cursed – Femi Oke with Raw TV for Audible Intrigue: To Catch a Scorpion – Sue Mitchell and Rob Lawrie with Winifred Robinson and Joel Moors for BBC Radio 4 Sergei & the Westminster Spy Ring – Carole Cadwalladr, Peter Jukes and Sergei Cristo with Ruth Abrahams and Project Citizen
Best Education Podcast	What's Your Map? – Prof. Jerry Brotton with Emily Uchida Finch and Whistledown Productions for Oculi Mundi	Life After Prison: Hold or Fold – Ben Jones and Steve Girling for National Prison Radio	Fun Kids Science Weekly – Fun Kids	LSE IQ – London School of Economics Department of Management
Best Entertainment Podcast	The Traitors: Uncloaked – Ed Gamble for BBC Sounds	This Paranormal Life – Rory Powers and Kit Grier Mulvenna	Vogue & Amber – Vogue Williams and Amber Wilson for Global	Elis James and John Robins – Elis James and John Robins with Audio Always for BBC Radio 5 Live Help I Sexted My Boss – William Hanson and Jordan North In between Man – Max Dickins and Rich Le Gate The Guilty Feminist – Deborah Frances-White of The Spontaneity Shop
Best Factual Podcast	The Coming Storm – Gabriel Gatehouse for BBC Radio 4	Babbage – Alok Jha for The Economist	Waterlands – Megan McCubbin for Wildfowl & Wetlands Trust	Believe in People – Matthew Butler for ReNew and Change Grow Live Beyond Five Senses – Robyn Landau and Katherine Templar-Lewis with Fresh Produce Media for Audible In Dark Corners – Alex Renton for BBC Radio 4 Sergei & the Westminster Spy Ring – Carole Cadwalladr, Peter Jukes and Sergei Cristo with Ruth Abrahams and Project Citizen
Best Fiction Podcast	Cold Tapes – Alexis Zegerman, Jonathan Myerson, Siân Fox and Polly Frame for BBC Sounds	Limelight: The Skies Are Watching – Jon Frechette and Todd Luoto with Goldhawk Productions for BBC Radio 4	Broken Veil – Will Maclean and Joel Morris with Cheese & Pickle and Loudburst	Limelight: Discretion – Chris Brandon and Davy Banks with Claire Broughton and Hat Trick Productions for BBC Radio 4 Last Dance – Max Blair with Blackabbey Productions Limelight: Money Gone – Ed Sellek with Naked Productions for BBC Radio 4 The Mysterious Affair at Styles – Anna Lea and Alice Lowe for Audible This Paranormal Life – Rory Powers and Kit Grier Mulvenna
Best Health & Wellbeing Podcast	In between Man – Max Dickins and Rich Le Gate	Why Mums Don't Jump – Helen Ledwick	My Life with Dementia – Kola Bokinni with Arlie Adlington for Dementia UK	Echoes of Harm – Marisa Bate with Chora Media for Angelini Pharma Hack your Body, Heal your Mind – Kimberley Wilson with BBC Studios for Audible Jon Holmes Says the C-Word – Jon Holmes with Laura Grimshaw and UNUSUAL Productions for BBC Radio 4
Best History Podcast	The History Podcast: The Brighton Bomb – Glenn Patterson with Lena Ferguson, Owen McFadden, Walk on Air Productions and Keo Films for BBC Radio 4	The Guernsey Deportees – Ollie Guillou and Phillippa Guillou for Channel Islands Podcasts	Sing It Pink – Aunt Nell Productions for The Pink Singers	Assume Nothing: Killer Dust – Ophelia Byrne for BBC Radio Ulster The Spy Who – Indira Varma, Raza Jaffrey and Emilia Fox with Wondery for Audible Titanic: Ship of Dreams – Paul McGann with Duncan Barrett and Miriam Baines for Noiser Podcast Network Weird in the Wade – Natalie Doig
Best Impact Podcast	Movers and Shakers: a podcast about life with Parkinson's – Rory Cellan-Jones, Gillian Lacey-Solymar, Mark Mardell, Paul Mayhew-Archer, Sir Nicholas Mostyn and Jeremy Paxman with Podot	A Slice of Bread and Butter – The Bread and Butter Thing	Shadow World: The Willpower Detectives – Sue Mitchell, Joel Moors and Winifred Robinson for BBC Radio 4	Oceans: Life Under Water – Hannah Stitfall with Crowd Network Productions for Greenpeace On the Side of Humanity – Tatyana Movshevich with Eli Block for Amnesty International QueerAF – Jamie Wareham and National Student Pride The Culture Colonel – Lindsay MacDuff for BFBS
Best Kids Podcast	Curious Kids – Eloise Stevens with Fun Kids for The Conversation	Evie Asks: How Are You? – Evie Pickerill with Audio Always	Yoto Daily – Jake Harris for Yoto	Checkpoint Kids Bedtime Stories – Checkpoint Magazine Hey Duggee Pupcast – CBeebies Radio The Reading Cafe – Peter Kelly
Best Lifestyle Podcast	DNA Trail: The Promise – Laura Ancell and Talia Slack for BBC Local Radio	Brown Girls Do It Too: Big Boy Energy – Poppy Jay for BBC Sounds	Life After Prison – National Prison Radio	Beyond Five Senses – Robyn Landau and Katherine Templar-Lewis with Fresh Produce Media for Audible Melting Pot – Jay Behrouzi for BBC Sounds Not Even Water – BBC Asian Network This Is Powerful – Paul Sculfor for the Stride Foundation
Best News & Current Affairs Podcast	Intrigue: To Catch a Scorpion – Sue Mitchell and Rob Lawrie with Winifred Robinson and Joel Moors for BBC Radio 4	Who Killed Emma? – Sam Poling and Mona McAlinden for BBC Radio Scotland	The BelTel – Belfast Telegraph	Business Daily – BBC World Service Newscast – BBC News Sergei & the Westminster Spy Ring – Carole Cadwalladr, Peter Jukes and Sergei Cristo with Ruth Abrahams and Project Citizen The Coming Storm – Gabriel Gatehouse for BBC Radio 4
Best Parenting Podcast	Momfessions – Laura Guckian	Dear Daughter – Namulanta Kombo for BBC World Service	Still Parents Podcast – Matt Whitehouse, Ryan Jackson and Dan Kelly	Happy Mum, Happy Baby – Giovanna Fletcher How to Feed – Charlotte Stirling-Reed Secret Mum Club – Sophiena with Emma Jones and Audio Always The Apple & The Tree – Rev. Richard Coles for the Daily Mail Two New Mums – Amy Voce and Jennie Longdon with the Auddy Network
Best Sex & Relationships Podcast	Criminally Queer: The Bolton 7 – Hugh Sheehan with Reduced Listening for BBC Sounds	The Affair... – Anna Williamson	All Out – Jon Dean	A Gay & A Non Gay – James Barr and Dan Hudson Sex in Space – Sex in Space The Divorce Podcast – Kate Daly
Best Sport Podcast	The Upshot – Josh Mansfield and Zachary Sweeney-Lynch with Footwork Media	How to Be Superhuman – Rob Pope for Red Bull	The Sports Agents – Gabby Logan and Mark Chapman for Global	F1 Explains – Formula One For the Love of Rugby – Ben Youngs and Dan Cole with Crowd Network Paula's Marathon Run Club – Paula Radcliffe and Chris 'Thommo' Thompson with Momentum Media and Broadcast That Peter Crouch Podcast – Peter Crouch, Chris Stark and Steve Sidwell The Game – Tom Clarke and Gregor Robertson for The Times
Best True Crime Podcast	Kill List – Carl Miller with Novel for Audible	Assume Nothing: Murder at the Stables – Susan Lynch with Cathy Young and Gemma Cunningham for BBC Radio Ulster	Disclosure Investigates: Dead Man Running – BBC Radio Scotland	Beyond Suspicion: The Criminals Who Betrayed Our Trust – Yinka Bokinni with ITN Productions for Audible Cocaine Inc. – Fiona Hamilton, David Collins and Stephen Drill for The Times, The Sunday Times and News Corp Australia Intrigue: To Catch a Scorpion – Sue Mitchell and Rob Lawrie with Winifred Robinson and Joel Moors for BBC Radio 4 Shadow World: Thief at the British Museum – Katie Razzall with Darin Graham, Ben Henderson and Larissa Kennelly for BBC Radio 4 Stalked – Carole Cadwalladr and Hannah Mossman Moore with Rob Byrne and Georgia Catt for BBC Sounds
Best Welsh Language Podcast Y Podlediad Cymraeg Gorau	Lleisiau Cymru: 1 mewn 2 – Mari Grug for BBC Radio Cymru	Yr Hen Iaith – Jerry Hunter and Richard Wyn Jones with Mimosa Cymru	Siarad Siop – Mari Beard and Meilir Rhys Williams	Sgwrsio – Nick Yeo
Format awards
Best Daily Podcast	Yoto Daily – Jake Harris for Yoto	The News Agents – Emily Maitlis, Jon Sopel and Lewis Goodall for Global	The Story – Manveen Rana and Luke Jones for The Times	Newscast – BBC News Daybreak Europe – Caroline Hepker, Stephen Carroll, Anna Edwards and Tom Mackenzie for Bloomberg Radio The Intelligence – The Economist Today in Focus – The Guardian
Best Interview Podcast	Widowed AF – Rosie Gill-Moss	The News Agents: Inside the Murky World of Facebook – Emily Maitlis, Jon Sopel and Lewis Goodall for Global	The Louis Theroux Podcast – Louis Theroux with Mindhouse Productions for Spotify	Believe in People – Matthew Butler for ReNew and Change Grow Live Everything I Know About Me – Daily Mail OUTCAST WORLD – Graeme Smith The Hidden 20% – Ben Branson for The Hidden 20%
Best New Podcast	Journeys with Grace – Grace "Gigi" with JWGSTORY	Strangers on a Bench – Tom Rosenthal	In between Man – Max Dickins and Rich Le Gate	Because the Boss Belongs to Us – Jesse Lawson and Holly Casio for iHeart Podcasts Life After Prison: Hold or Fold – Ben Jones and Steve Girling for National Prison Radio RadioTherapy – Julie Cain Words Unravelled – Rob "RobWords" Watts and Jess Zafarris
Video Innovation Award	Miss Me? – Lily Allen and Miquita Oliver with Persephonica Productions for BBC Sounds	Staying Relevant – Sam Thompson and Pete Wicks	Help I Sexted My Boss – William Hanson and Jordan North	Access All: Disability News and Mental Health – Emma Tracey with Beth Rose for BBC Sounds Lady Killers – Lucy Worsley with StoryHunter Productions for BBC Radio 4 Radio Atlas – Eleanor McDowall
People and teams awards
Best Host(s)	Angela Hartnett and Nick Grimshaw	Femi Oke	Dan Snow	David Tennant Helen Pidd Louis Theroux Luke Jones Zak Addae-Kodua and Jules Rowan
Best Network or Publisher	Prison Radio Association	History Hit	Sony Music Entertainment	BBC World Service Fun Kids Global Wondery
Secret Media Network Rising Star Award	Mia Thornton	Marnie Duke	Anoushka Mutanda-Dougherty	Clodagh Stenson Toni Tone

== 2026 ==
The longlist for the 2026 British Podcast Awards was revealed on 6 July 2026, with the shortlist of nominees revealed later that month on 23 July. The Listeners' Choice Award voting was split into two rounds: a nomination round held on the British Podcast Awards website for two weeks in July, and the final voting round held via Spotify which ran from 30 July to 28 August 2026. In September 2026, the host was announced as comedian Jake Bhardwaj, co-host of the podcasts Joe Marler Will See You Now and Pub Quiz Pod.

The ceremony took place on 1 October 2026 in the Indigo at The O2 in London. The Podcast of the Year award went to Hold or Fold, hosted by Ben Jones and Steve Girling for National Prison Radio. The Listeners' Choice Award was won by Hard Launch with Dan and Phil, hosted by YouTubers Daniel Howell and Phil Lester.

=== 2026 Nominees and Winners ===
Awards with only one winner are marked with a ‡, posthumous awards are marked with a †.

Award title	Gold	Silver	Bronze	Shortlisted
Editors' Choice awards
Podcast of the Year ‡	Life After Prison: Hold or Fold – Ben Jones and Steve Girling for National Prison Radio			—N/a
Specialist Award ‡	The Dementia Perspective – Guernsey Alzheimer's Association			Breaking Atoms: The Hip Hop Podcast – Sumit Sharma and Chris Mitchell Do I detect a problem? – James Deacon for Sync Clap Mind Your Business – Sara Davies and Helen Goddard Momfessions – Laura Guckian On Hold – Katy Davis with Storied Productions Real with Ric: Life after Loss – Ric Hart with Rural Recording Ltd Rhaglen Cymru – Andy Bell Sut i Ddarllen – Francesca Sciarrillo for Cyngor Llyfrau Cymru The Art of Adventure – Hugh Taylor for Arthur Beale The Cockney Yiddish Podcast – Nadia Valman and Vivi Lachs The Overturn – Marnie Duke for the Future Justice Project The Reading Cafe – Peter Kelly
Spotlight Award ‡	Dish – Nick Grimshaw and Angela Hartnett for Waitrose			Bottoms Up! – Alan Carr and Lee Peart with Platform Media Coining It – Lewis Goodall with Global NewlyParents – Sophie Habboo and Jamie Laing with JamPot Originals Politically: Postwar – David Runciman for BBC Radio 4 Sliced Bread – Greg Foot for BBC Radio 4 The Intelligence – The Economist The Louis Theroux Podcast – Louis Theroux with Mindhouse Productions for Spotify Today in Focus – The Guardian What's My Age Again? – Katherine Ryan with Rayo Originals World of Secrets: Death in Dubai – Runako Celina with Ruth Evans, Ly Truong and Thread Studios for BBC World Service
Publicly voted awards
Listeners' Choice Award ‡ powered by Spotify	Hard Launch with Dan and Phil – Daniel Howell and Phil Lester with Emilia Wheatley, Leila Al-Mitwally and Studio71			13 Again – Max Mills, Harvey Mills and Tilly Mills After Dark: Myths, Misdeeds & the Paranormal – Anthony Delaney and Maddy Pelling for History Hit At Home with the Thomas Bros – Ryan Thomas, Adam Thomas and Scott Thomas Betwixt The Sheets: The History of Sex, Scandal & Society – Dr. Kate Lister for History Hit Dig It – Jo Whiley and Zoe Ball with Persephonica Dish – Nick Grimshaw and Angela Hartnett for Waitrose Hanging Out with Ant & Dec – Ant McPartlin and Declan Donnelly with Belta Box and Platform Media It's a Girl Thing – Ebony Day and Lucie Houchin Live, Laugh, Luke – Luke Hamnett and Jan Hamnett with Grape Productions Lost in Translation – Gorka Márquez and Gemma Atkinson with Bauer Media Mom Can't Cook! A DCOM Podcast – Luke Westaway and Andy Farrant Nip Tuck – Ashley Stobart and Lauren Adamson with Bauer Media No Appointment Necessary – Dr. Amir Khan and Cherry Healey with James Carpenter, Jo Scaratt-Jones and Made You Look Studios Olivia's House – Olivia Attwood with Lemonada Media and Platform Media Table Manners – Jessie Ware and Lennie Ware The Jack & Ash Show – Jack Remmington and Ash Holme with Audio Always Twinhood – Maisie Peters and Ellen Peters Yoto Daily – Jake Harris for Yoto
Genre awards
Best Arts & Culture Podcast	Legend: The Bruce Springsteen Story – Laura Barton, Mair Bosworth and Eliza Lomas for BBC Radio 4	Breaking Atoms: The Hip Hop Podcast – Sumit Sharma and Chris Mitchell	The Cockney Yiddish Podcast – Nadia Valman and Vivi Lachs	Jane Austen's Paper Trail – Anna Walker with Gemma Ware for The Conversation So, Hear Me Out – Linton Stephens and Gillian Moore for the Southbank Centre Soundtracking – Edith Bowman The Rise and Fall of Indie Sleaze – Kate Nash with Jack Howson, Rich Power and Peanut & Crumb Productions for BBC Radio 6 Music
Best Business Podcast	The Factory Next Door – Steve Duke	Mind Your Business – Sara Davies and Helen Goddard	We Built This City: Greater Manchester – Roland Dransfield	Boss Class – Andrew Palmer for The Economist Executive Decisions – Steve Sedgwick for CNBC Europe Jobs of the Future – Jimmy McLoughlin OBE The Relentless Optimist – Meliora Walking Out Loud – Liam Black and David McQueen with Tandem Productions
Best Comedy Podcast	Who Shat On The Floor At My Wedding? And Other Crimes: When The Cops Say No, We Say Yes – Lauren Kilby and Karen Whitehouse	Where There's A Will, There's A Wake – Mel Giedroyc with Somethin' Else for Sony Music Entertainment	Joe and James Fact Up – Joe Thomas and James Buckley with Audio Always	Fin vs History – Fin Taylor and Horatio Gould Alan Partridge: From the Oasthouse – Steve Coogan for Audible Mel & Sue: Should Know By Now – Mel Giedroyc and Sue Perkins for Audible The Guilty Feminist – Deborah Frances-White of The Spontaneity Shop The Skewer – Jon Holmes for BBC Radio 4
Best Documentary Podcast	Can I Tell You a Secret? The Birth Keepers – Sirin Kale and Lucy Osborne for The Guardian	In Detail... The Toxic Waste Scandal – George Taylor and Tim Wheeler with Sarah-Jane Muddiman for BBC Radio Northampton	Shadow World: Anatomy of a Cancellation – Katie Razzall with Charlotte McDonald for BBC Radio 4	Beware Book – Rayo Originals The History Podcast: Half-Life – Joe Dunthorne with Eleanor McDowall and Falling Tree Productions for BBC Radio 4 Made in China – Eva Brookes with Reduced Listening Productions for BBC Sounds The Girlfriends: Untouchable – Carole Fisher with Novel for iHeart True Crime World of Secrets: Death in Dubai – Runako Celina with Ruth Evans, Ly Truong and Thread Studios for BBC World Service
Best Education Podcast	Talking Rubbish – James Piper and Robbie Staniforth for The Rubbish Collective	Science Quest – Dan Simpson for Fun Kids	English Like a Native – Anna Tyrie for English Like a Native	A Little Bit Richer – Iona Bain for Legal & General Life After Prison: Hold or Fold – Ben Jones and Steve Girling for National Prison Radio The Curve with Soph & Vic – Sophie Hallwright and Victoria Harris for The Curve Investments The Pension Confident Podcast – PensionBee
Best Entertainment Podcast sponsored by Industria Studios	NewlyParents – Sophie Habboo and Jamie Laing with JamPot Originals	This Paranormal Life – Rory Powers and Kit Grier Mulvenna	ill-advised – Bill Nighy with Alice Williams, Ciara Gregory and EYEPOD Studios	Dig It – Jo Whiley and Zoe Ball with Persephonica FolkLands – Tim Downie and Justin Chubb Second Act – Ateh Jewel for HELLO! Magazine The Louis Theroux Podcast – Louis Theroux with Mindhouse Productions for Spotify What's My Age Again? – Katherine Ryan with Rayo Originals
Best Factual Podcast	Life After Prison: Hold or Fold – Ben Jones and Steve Girling for National Prison Radio	Science Quest – Dan Simpson for Fun Kids	Wonderful Life – Stephen Fry with SamFry Productions for Audible	Tech Tonic – John Thornhill for the Financial Times The Download – Pema Monaghan and Jake Harris for Yoto The Story – Manveen Rana and Luke Jones for The Times When Science Finds a Way – Alisha Wainwright for Wellcome Trust
Best Fiction Podcast	Project Bläckfisk – Rebecca Gillespie and Dominic Stephenson	Leyline High: Rewind – Gemma Arrowsmith, Susan Harrison and Thomas Nelstrop	Limelight: Wolf Valley – Charlotte Melén with Eleanor Mein and Almost Tangible Productions for BBC Radio 4	Broken Veil – Will Maclean and Joel Morris with Cheese & Pickle and Loudburst Heathcliff – Gracie Oddie-James and Mahalia Belo for Audible Limelight: The Dentist – D.C. Jackson and Kirsty Williams with Andy Hay and Gav Murchie for BBC Radio 4 Limelight: Murder on Mars – Tim Foley and Anne Isger for BBC Radio 4 The Divide – Matthew Woodcock with Maxamillian John for Definitely Human
Best Food & Drink Podcast	Bottoms Up! – Alan Carr and Lee Peart with Platform Media	Table Manners – Jessie Ware and Lennie Ware	Heard – Helen Brown and Ryan King with Rooted Agency	Dish – Nick Grimshaw and Angela Hartnett for Waitrose Lunchbox Envy – Jack Chambers, Manu Henriot and Rosie MacKean The Nightcap – Simon Alexander and Paul Foster for Shakespeare Creative
Best Health & Wellbeing Podcast	Man Made – Pete Wicks with Bauer Media	The Dementia Perspective – Guernsey Alzheimer's Association	Momfessions – Laura Guckian	It's So Loud In Here! – Keira Edwards for BBC Sounds Reset Your Health – Jamie Oliver for Audible Sliced Bread – Greg Foot for BBC Radio 4 What's My Age Again? – Katherine Ryan with Rayo Originals When Science Finds a Way – Alisha Wainwright for Wellcome Trust
Best History Podcast	The History Podcast: The House at Number 48 – Charlie Northcott with Jim Frank for BBC Radio 4	Dexplorers – Podomedy Kids	Politically: Postwar – David Runciman for BBC Radio 4	Assume Nothing: The Radiation Holiday – Raisa Carolan with Sara Smyth for BBC Radio Ulster Back When – Helen Antrobus and James Grasby for the National Trust History Hit – Dan Snow for History Hit The History Podcast: Half-Life – Joe Dunthorne with Eleanor McDowall and Falling Tree Productions for BBC Radio 4 Witness History – BBC World Service
Best Impact Podcast	SEND in the Spotlight – Nuala McGovern with Sarah Crawley and Carolyn Atkinson for BBC Sounds	Crime Next Door: The Beast of Birkenhead – Olivia Graham with Kate Bissell and Gemma Maull for BBC Radio Merseyside	Talking Rubbish – James Piper and Robbie Staniforth for The Rubbish Collective	SOIL: Common Ground – Shenece Oretha with Jo Barratt and Alannah Chance for Somerset House The Overturn – Marnie Duke for the Future Justice Project The Wargame – Deborah Haynes with Tortoise Media for Sky News Untold: Toxic Legacy – Laura Hughes for the Financial Times Wild Tales – Rosie Holdsworth, Ajay Tegala and Heather Birkett for the National Trust
Best Kids Podcast	Audiomoves in Space – Charlie Hendren, Daphna Attias and Bridie Donaghy with Peut-Être Theatre and the Royal Observatory	Judge Bex – Fun Kids	Today with Tonies – Sam Fletcher-Goodwin and Tim Warwood for Tonies	Dexplorers – Podomedy Kids Errol's Garden – Kate Golledge, Caroline Wigmore and Jen Green for Golden Toad Theatre Koala Moon: Kids Bedtime Stories & Meditations – Koko Sleep and Starglow Medi Yoto Daily – Jake Harris for Yoto
Best Lifestyle Podcast	Get Birding – Sean Bean with Peanut and Crumb for Get Birding	Dig It – Jo Whiley and Zoe Ball with Persephonica	Get A Grip – Angela Scanlon and Vicky Pattison with Audio Always	As the Season Turns – Lia Leendertz with Ffern Floating Space – Katie Stokes Talking Rubbish – James Piper and Robbie Staniforth for The Rubbish Collective This Was Always Me – Richard Clarke with Global Your Aunties Could Never – Akua Gyamfi, Farrah Charles and Nana Evans
Best News, Politics & Current Affairs Podcast	The Wargame – Deborah Haynes with Tortoise Media for Sky News	The Intelligence – The Economist	Iran: The Latest – Roland Oliphant and Venetia Rainey for The Telegraph	Borderland – UK or United Ireland? – Chris Buckler, Ian Paisley Jr and Michelle Gildernew Electoral Dysfunction – Beth Rigby, Ruth Davidson and Harriet Harman for Sky News Page 94 – Andrew Hunter Murray, Ian Hislop, Helen Lewis and Adam Macqueen for Private Eye Piers Morgan Uncensored – Piers Morgan Today in Focus – The Guardian
Best Parenting Podcast	The ADHD Women's Wellbeing Podcast – Kate Moryoussef	Momfessions – Laura Guckian	Still Parents Podcast – Matt Whitehouse, Ryan Jackson and Dan Kelly	Bitesize Parenting Teens – Kerry Godliman with Carmel O'Grady and Michael Farnell for BBC Sounds CBeebies Parenting Helpline – Holly Hagan-Blyth and Charlie Hedges for CBeebies Judged: A Mother's Love – Katie Bridget Murphy with Ophelia Byrne for BBC Sounds Parentline NI - Your Guide to Parenting – Children in Northern Ireland
Best Sex & Relationships Podcast	Atonement: The John Paulk Story – John Paulk with OutSpoken Productions for iHeart Podcasts	The Divorce Podcast – Kate Daly	Bisexual Brunch – Ashley Byrne, Lewis Oakley and Samantha Baines for Made in Manchester	Sex in Space – Sex in Space Trans Crush – Pavie Valsa and Zelah Glasson
Best Sport Podcast	That Peter Crouch Podcast – Peter Crouch, Chris Stark and Steve Sidwell	Stick to Cricket – Michael Vaughan, Sir Alastair Cook, David 'Bumble' Lloyd and Phil Tufnell for The Overlap and Betfair	F1: Chequered Flag – BBC Radio 5 Live	Football Weekly – Max Rushden for The Guardian Stick to Football – Gary Neville, Jamie Carragher, Jill Scott, Ian Wright and Roy Keane for The Overlap The Good, The Bad & The Football – Paul Scholes, Nicky Butt and Paddy McGuinness with Platform Media The Ruck – Alfie Reynolds, Alex Lowe and Will Kelleher for The Times Whistleblowers – Gordon Smart, Mark Clattenburg and Ian Ladyman with Henry Williams for the Daily Mail
Best True Crime Podcast sponsored by Sue Terry Voices	Coining It – Lewis Goodall with Global	Codename Badger – Eugene Henderson, Andy Clark and Nicky Hibbin with Audio Always	Times Investigates: The Poppy Day Bomb – Mario Ledwith for The Times	Beware Book – Rayo Originals Crime Next Door: The Beast of Birkenhead – Olivia Graham with Kate Bissell and Gemma Maull for BBC Radio Merseyside Intrigue: Ransom Man – Jenny Kleeman with Sam Peach and Georgia Catt for BBC Radio 4 Seventeen Years: The Andrew Malkinson Story – Emily Dugan with Stories of our Times for The Times The Missing Sister – Charlie Brinkhurst-Cuff and Seren Jones for BBC Sounds
Best Welsh Language Podcast Y Podlediad Cymraeg Gorau	Hanes Mawr Cymru – Llinos Mai with Llinos Jones and Terrier Productions for BBC Radio Cymru	Rhaglen Cymru – Andy Bell	Sut i Ddarllen – Francesca Sciarrillo for Cyngor Llyfrau Cymru	Sgwrsio – Nick Yeo Siarad Siop – Mari Beard and Meilir Rhys Williams Sŵntrack – Joe Morgan Y Podlediad Dysgu Cymraeg: Pont – BBC Radio Cymru
Format awards
Best Daily Podcast	The Intelligence – The Economist	Today in Focus – The Guardian	Walk the Pod – Rachel Wheeley	13 Minutes Presents: Artemis II – Maggie Aderin, Tim Peake and Kristin Fisher with Alex Mansfield and Sophie Ormiston for BBC World Service Newscast – BBC News The Story – Manveen Rana and Luke Jones for The Times Today in History – The Retrospectors (Olly Mann, Rebecca Messina and Arion McNicoll)
Best Interview Podcast	Man Made – Pete Wicks with Bauer Media	Dish – Nick Grimshaw and Angela Hartnett for Waitrose	The Louis Theroux Podcast – Louis Theroux with Mindhouse Productions for Spotify	How Do You Cope? Richard Osman – John Robins with Wondery How to Fail – Elizabeth Day The Mishal Husain Show – Mishal Husain for Bloomberg Radio The Modern Mann – Olly Mann, Alix Fox and Ollie Peart The Reading Cafe – Peter Kelly
Best New Podcast	Do I detect a problem? – James Deacon for Sync Clap	On Hold – Katy Davis with Storied Productions	The Art of Adventure – Hugh Taylor for Arthur Beale	The Mishal Husain Show – Mishal Husain for Bloomberg Radio The State of Us: The Noah Donohoe Inquest – Tara Mills and Declan Harvey for BBC Northern Ireland There's A Lot I Haven't Asked – Hannah Donelon Top Comment – Marianna Spring and Matt Shea for BBC Radio 4
Video Innovation Award sponsored by Canon	Get Birding – Sean Bean with Peanut and Crumb for Get Birding	Dish – Nick Grimshaw and Angela Hartnett for Waitrose	This Paranormal Life – Rory Powers and Kit Grier Mulvenna	Do I detect a problem? – James Deacon for Sync Clap Game's Gone: The Steve Bracknall Podcast – Steve Bracknall for BBC Radio 5 Live Joe Marler Will See You Now – Joe Marler and Jake Bhardwaj with Platform Media Reporting History – Tom Bradby for ITV News The Mishal Husain Show – Mishal Husain for Bloomberg Radio
People and teams awards
Best Host(s)	Bill Nighy	Annie Kelly, Helen Pidd, Nosheen Iqbal and Lucy Hough	Edith Bowman	Anna Sinfield Katherine Ryan Lily Allen, Miquita Oliver and Jordan Stephens Louis Theroux William Hanson and Jordan North
Best Network or Publisher	BBC World Service	Platform Media	Sony Music Podcasts	Fresh Air Productions Fun Kids History Hit JamPot Productions Unedited
Rising Star Award sponsored by Secret Media Network London	Georgie Styles	Naomi Bloomstein	Eva Brookes	Anna Wolfe Hugh Sheehan Katie Bridget Murphy Maya Raichoora
