= The Cinemile =

Film review podcast

the cinemile podcast

The Cinemile is a film review podcast hosted by Dave Corkery and Cathy Cullen where they record their walk home from the movies.

== Concept and history ==
The Cinemile is a two-person podcast. Launched in 2016, it consists of weekly conversations between a married couple from Cork, Dave Corkery and Cathy Cullen, on their walk home from the movies. The podcast has been praised for its simple premise and feeling "like you’re eavesdropping on two ordinary pals who simply love movies".

To celebrate the 100th episode of the show, Cullen and Corkery vacationed in Spain and reviewed The Shape of Water. Launched when the hosts lived in London, the podcast is, as of 2022, made in Cork, Ireland.

== Reception ==
Miranda Sawyer of The Observer said the show is "suffused with charm and insight." Josh Jones of LeCool London called the show "delightfully simple." New Statesmen named the show "best new podcasts of 2017." Henrietta McKervey from The Irish Independent called The Cinemile "podcast gold".

In 2026, The Irish Independent and RTE Culture praised the podcast on its 10-year anniversary. "Many film franchises go stale after 10 years but the same can’t be said for The Cinemile" (The Irish Independent) and "This long-running podcast celebrates its milestone 10th birthday this year and it still sounds as good as ever - mostly because it's a simple concept, executed brilliantly". (RTE Culture).

The Cinemile has won a British Podcast Award an Irish Podcast Award and an Independent Podcast Award.

=== Awards ===
Award	Date	Category	Result	Ref.
British Podcast Awards	2017	Best New Podcast	Gold	
Pod Bible Awards	2022	Best Independent Podcast	Won	
Irish Podcast Awards	2023	Best Arts & Culture Podcast	Won	
