= Lotte Jeffs =

British journalist, podcaster and novelist

- Born: May 1982 (age 44)
- Education: University of Leeds
- Occupations: Author, editor, journalist, podcaster
- Spouse: Jenny Southan
- Children: 1
- Website: https://lottejeffs.com/

Lotte Jeffs (born May 1982) is a British author, journalist, editor and podcaster. She has published five books across a variety of genres, including fiction, non-fiction, memoir, and children's literature. She has written for The Times, The Guardian, and The Telegraph, and was previously the acting Editor-in-Chief of ELLE UK Magazine. In 2016, she won 'Writer of The Year' at the Professional Publishers Association Awards.

== Early life ==
Jeffs attended a state school in Putney.

== Personal life ==
Jeffs is nonbinary.

== Chronological works ==
- How To Be A Gentlewoman: The Art of Soft Power in Hard Times, published by Cassell Illustrated (Octopus Publishing Group) in September 2019.
- My Magic Family, Jeffs' first children's picture book about the diversity of modern families with illustrations by Sharon Davey, was published by Puffin in May 2022.
- The Queer Parent: Everything You Need To Know From Gay To Ze was published by Pan Macmillan in 2022, co-authored with Stu Oakley.
- This Love, her debut novel about the power of queer friendship, was published by Dialogue Books in February 2024.

Jeffs has also hosted three podcasts. In collaboration with Stu Oakley, she has hosted the podcast Some Families, which explored her guests' experiences of LGBTQ+ parenting and won a Gold British Podcast Award in 2021. From Gay to Ze was a follow-up podcast exploring the broader spectrum of queer culture in media and pop culture. Jeffs also hosted Grazia Life Advice for a year.
