= Stories of Scotland =

Scottish history podcast

Stories of Scotland is a non-fiction history podcast hosted by Jenny Johnstone and Annie MacDonald. Created in 2019, the podcast discusses Scottish history and folklore using archival research. The podcast came to a close in 2024 after 5 years of Scottish tales of history and legends.

== Overview ==
The podcast was created in July 2019 by environmental scientist Jenny Johnstone and archivist Annie MacDonald and is recorded in the Highlands of Scotland. The podcast discusses Scottish heritage and culture often using archival sources and oral histories to highlight lesser known stories. For LGBT History Month 2021, the podcast released a mini-series retelling Highland folklore with an LGBT twist funded by the Edwin Morgan Trust.

== Reception ==
The podcast was shortlisted for the Smartest Podcast category of the British Podcast Awards 2021. In June 2021 the Scottish Parliament lodged a motion to congratulate the podcast on its nomination.
