= Helena Merriman =

British journalist and broadcaster

- Occupation: Journalist
- Employer: BBC
- Notable work: Tunnel 29
- Children: 2
- Website: helenamerriman.com

Helena Merriman is a journalist and broadcaster. She is the creator of the BBC Radio 4 podcast Tunnel 29 and author of the book of the same title.

== Tunnel 29 ==
Tunnel 29 was a 10-part podcast series, launched by the BBC in October 2019, revealing how a group of young men tunnelled under the Berlin Wall in the early 1960s to smuggle people out of East Berlin. The podcast had over 3 million listeners. It won the Best Radio Podcast and Best Moment awards at the British Podcast Awards 2020: "A beautifully crafted and well-timed podcast that tunnelled right into our hearts. The series gathered TV and press coverage across the world, and helped bring the medium – and an incredible story – to a brand new audience. Brilliant work."

The book Tunnel 29: The True Story of an Extraordinary Escape Beneath the Berlin Wall was published by Hodder & Stoughton in 2021 to coincide with the 60th anniversary of the building of the Berlin Wall. It was named one of The Economist's best books of 2021. Writing in The Guardian, Philip Oltermann described the book as a "thrilling page-turner".

The television rights were acquired by Sister. Other bidders included See-Saw, Temple Hill and Endeavor

== Personal life ==
Merriman attended Alleyn's School, an independent school in Dulwich, London. She is married with two children. She lives in London.

In 2018, Merriman was diagnosed with otosclerosis, a genetic condition that causes loss of hearing. The condition, affecting the hearing in her right ear, was brought on after the birth of her second child. After an operation to restore her hearing, she is able to hear again but suffers with extreme tinnitus. The problem was the genesis of an idea for Room 5, a podcast.
