= The Hurricane Tapes =

BBC true crime podcast series

- Genre: True crime
- Format: Podcast

Cast and voices
- Hosted by: Steve Crossman

Music
- Theme music composed by: Nick Thorburn

Production
- Production: Joel Hammer
- Length: Variable (27–53 minutes)

Publication
- No. of episodes: 13
- Original release: 14 January – 1 April 2019
- Provider: BBC World Service

Reception
- Ratings: 3/5

Related
- Website: www.bbc.co.uk/programmes/w13xttt6

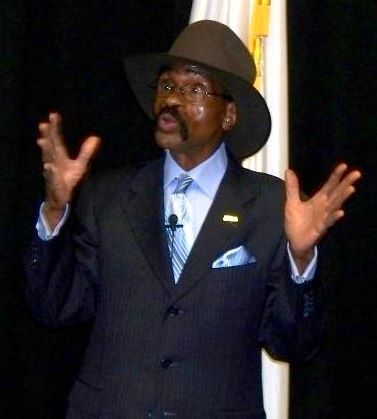
Rubin Carter in 2011

The Hurricane Tapes is a 13-part BBC World Service podcast series, released in 2019, discussing in detail the case of Rubin Carter, an American-Canadian middleweight boxer, wrongfully convicted twice of murder in 1966 and 1976 respectively and later released following a petition of habeas corpus in 1985 after serving almost 20 years in prison.

Presenter Steve Crossman and producer Joel Hammer use interviews with survivors, case notes from the original investigations, and 40 hours of tapes recorded with Carter by author Ken Klonsky for his 2011 book The Eye of the Hurricane and recordings of Vincent DeSimone, the lead detective.

== Reception ==
According to Sarah Larson in The New Yorker The Hurricane Tapes skilfully shows how the violence central to Rubin Carter’s meandering life led to a boxing career—and how quickly boxing took him from pariah to hero and back again. The exhaustive amount of research was praised upon its inclusion in The Atlantic 50 best podcasts of 2019. The Daily Telegraph called it “a superb listen”.

== Awards ==
BBC World Service Sport won best Audio / Radio Documentary for The Hurricane Tapes at the 2019 British Sports Journalism Awards. It was awarded silver in the Best True Crime Podcast category in the 2020 British Podcast Awards. It garnered the Silver Radio Winner in the Narrative/Documentary Podcast category at the New York Festival Radio Awards. The series was nominated for investigation of the year at the 2019 Prix Europa broadcasting awards.
