= Imaginary Advice =

Fiction podcast

- Genre: Audio fiction, storytelling
- Country of origin: UK

Creative team
- Created by: Ross Sutherland

Cast and voices
- Hosted by: Ross Sutherland

Publication
- No. of episodes: 124

Reception
- Ratings: 4.571428571428571/5

Related
- Website: https://www.imaginaryadvice.com

Imaginary Advice is an experimental audio fiction podcast by Ross Sutherland.

== Background ==
The podcast is created and hosted by the British filmmaker Ross Sutherland. The show is an experimental audio fiction podcast that is unpredictable. Sutherland collaborated with Clive Desmond on an episode titled "Exquisite Corpse". The episode titled "S.E.I.N.F.E.L.D." was praised in Vulture, The Guardian, and Oprah Daily. Nicholas Quah noted that the miniseries titled "The Golden House" is similar in tone to Black Mirror. The A.V. Club compared the episode titled "Me Versus The Spar (Parts 1–7)" to the novel Cloud Atlas. The show has an episode about a character who becomes obsessed with a Sex and the City theater piece. The podcast won Gold at the 2018 British Podcast Awards for best fiction podcast.
