= Field Recordings (podcast) =

Podcast created by Eleanor McDowall

Field Recordings is a podcast created by Eleanor McDowall that is composed of short recordings of environmental sound from a variety of locations internationally. The show does not contain any introduction or talking and is an example of slow media.

== Background ==
The show debuted in March 2020 and released over 70 episodes by May. The episodes are relatively short in length. The name of the show is a play on words because the show is composed of recordings made while standing silently in a field or locations that could be interpretted as a field. The episodes are recorded all over the world in a variety of environments and often include sounds from the wildlife local to each area. While some episodes include sounds from nature and wildlife others include sounds from cities. Episode names include the location that the recording was made.

The show began around the time of the COVID-19 pandemic when many people were quarantined and unable to enjoy the outdoors. Each episode is composed of sounds recorded outside without any introduction or talking. The show is an example of slow media. McDowall released an episode at the end of 2020 containing snippets of audio clips from all the episodes released throughout the year.

The show won best new podcast at the 2021 British Podcast Awards.
