= David Walliams' Marvellous Musical Podcast =

Children's podcast

Presentation
- Genre: educational podcast
- Language: English language

Production
- No. of episodes: 11

Publication
- Ratings: 4.7/5

Related
- Website: http://marvellousmusicalpodcast.com/

David Walliams' Marvellous Musical Podcast is a classical music podcast for kids between the ages of seven and 12. The podcast is produced by Classic FM and presented by David Walliams.

== Background ==
The show is a classical music podcast for kids. The intended audience for the show are children between the ages of seven and 12. The podcast is produced by Classic FM. The show is a 10 part series. Clive Davis gave the show a four out of five star rating in The Times.

=== Awards ===
Award	Date	Category	Result	Ref.
British Podcast Awards	2020	Best Family Podcast	gold	
British Podcast Awards	2020	The Creativity Award	Nominated	
Global Awards	2020	Best Podcast	Longlisted	

== See also ==
- List of children's podcasts
- List of music podcasts
