= Vitaly Shevchenko (journalist) =

Ukrainian journalist

Vitaly Alexandrovich Shevchenko (Ukrainian: Віталій Олександрович Шевченко) is a Ukrainian journalist. Since 2012, he has worked for BBC Monitoring, specialising in the former Soviet Union. He is a regular contributor to the BBC Podcast, Ukrainecast.
