= Kate Daly =

Kate Daly (born October 1970) is a British entrepreneur, author and former relationship counsellor. She is the co-founder of amicable, an online legal service for people navigating relationship change, including cohabitation, divorce and separation in England and Wales. She also hosts The Divorce Podcast, which explores relationships, separation, wellbeing and co-parenting.

Daly has commented on divorce processes and has supported approaches that prioritise cooperation between separating couples.

== Early life and education ==
Daly grew up near Whipsnade, Bedfordshire. She studied psychology at the University of Sheffield and later completed a master's degree in counselling psychology at Roehampton University.

== Early career ==
Daly began her career as a management consultant, before moving into relationship counselling.

Daly moved into divorce coaching after her own divorce, working with couples to improve communication and reduce conflict during separation.

In iNews, Daly wrote that after her divorce she began working with lawyers to help couples navigate the emotional aspects of separation before co-founding her company amicable.

== amicable ==
Daly co-founded amicable in 2015 with technology entrepreneur Pip Wilson, who had previously co-founded and sold the consultancy Bluefin Solutions.

According to The Sunday Times, Daly's own divorce, which cost around £80,000 in legal fees, influenced her decision to create an alternative approach for separating couples.

The service originated as an app designed to help couples going through separation or divorce manage financial information, divide assets and make arrangements for children, with the aim of reducing reliance on lawyers and lowering costs.

The Guardian reported that the platform initially helped couples prepare information before meeting a solicitor, before expanding into broader support services around divorce and separation.

The BBC reported that amicable was designed to help couples agree and draft divorce settlements collaboratively, without relying on traditional solicitor-led processes.

The Sunday Times later described the company as offering fixed-fee services aimed at helping couples negotiate arrangements and prepare consent orders without using the traditional two-solicitor model.

In 2023, amicable was acquired by Octopus Group, with the deal described as supporting the company's plans for further growth.

=== High Court case ===
In 2020, amicable was involved in a High Court case concerning whether its business model breached conflict of interest rules or the Legal Services Act by assisting separating couples in preparing legal documents.

In the case of JK v MK [2020], Mr Justice Mostyn rejected the complaints and confirmed that amicable's model did not give rise to a conflict of interest and did not breach the Legal Services Act.

The judge stated that "there can be no doubt" that amicable had "greatly improved access to justice" for many people unable to afford traditional legal services.

== Public commentary ==
Daly has commented on divorce, relationships and family law reform in UK media.

She has written about divorce law and separation, including the introduction of no-fault divorce in England and Wales, arguing that removing blame from the legal process can reduce conflict between separating couples.

She has also written opinion pieces for national publications including The Times on topics related to divorce and family policy.

== Publications ==
In 2012, Daly co-authored The Courage to Ask: Cultivating Opportunity in the New Economy with John Niland, a business book exploring themes of courage and good conversations.

In 2026, she published her second book, amicable divorce: Your Practical Guide to Divorce Without the Drama, a non-fiction guide to navigating separation and divorce collaboratively. The book was published by Souvenir Press, an imprint of Little, Brown Book Group.

The book was described in The Sunday Times as a guide to approaching separation in a less painful and more cooperative way, whether or not readers use Daly's company.

== The Divorce Podcast ==
Daly hosts The Divorce Podcast, which explores issues related to relationships, divorce, separation, wellbeing and co-parenting.

The podcast was nominated in the "Sex and relationships" category at the British Podcast Awards 2025.
