= Fake Heiress =

Podcast

- Genre: True Crime
- Language: English

Creative team
- Created by: Reporting by Vicky Baker Drama by Chloe Moss
- Directed by: Sasha Yevtushenko

Cast and voices
- Hosted by: Vicky Baker, Chloe Moss
- Starring: Bella Dayne, Chris Lew Kum Hoi, Heather Craney, Will Kirk, Scarlett Courtney, Neil McCaul, Clive Hayward, Ian Conningham, Lucy Reynolds, Adam Courting, Greg Jones, Laura Christy, Jessica Turner, Ikky Elyas, Sinead MacInnes

Production
- Length: 30 minutes

Publication
- No. of episodes: 8
- Original release: 16 December 2019
- Provider: BBC, Radio 4

Reception
- Ratings: 4.230769230769231/5

Related
- Website: www.bbc.co.uk/programmes/m000c9mb

Fake Heiress is a podcast on BBC Radio 4 about the criminal career of Anna Sorokin, also known as Anna Delvey, a Russian-born German con artist and fraudster who posed as a wealthy heiress to access the upper echelons of New York City's social and art scenes from 2013 to 2017.

The series was created and hosted by BBC World journalist Vicky Baker and playwright Chloe Moss.
