= Yoto (audio player) =

Digital audio players for children

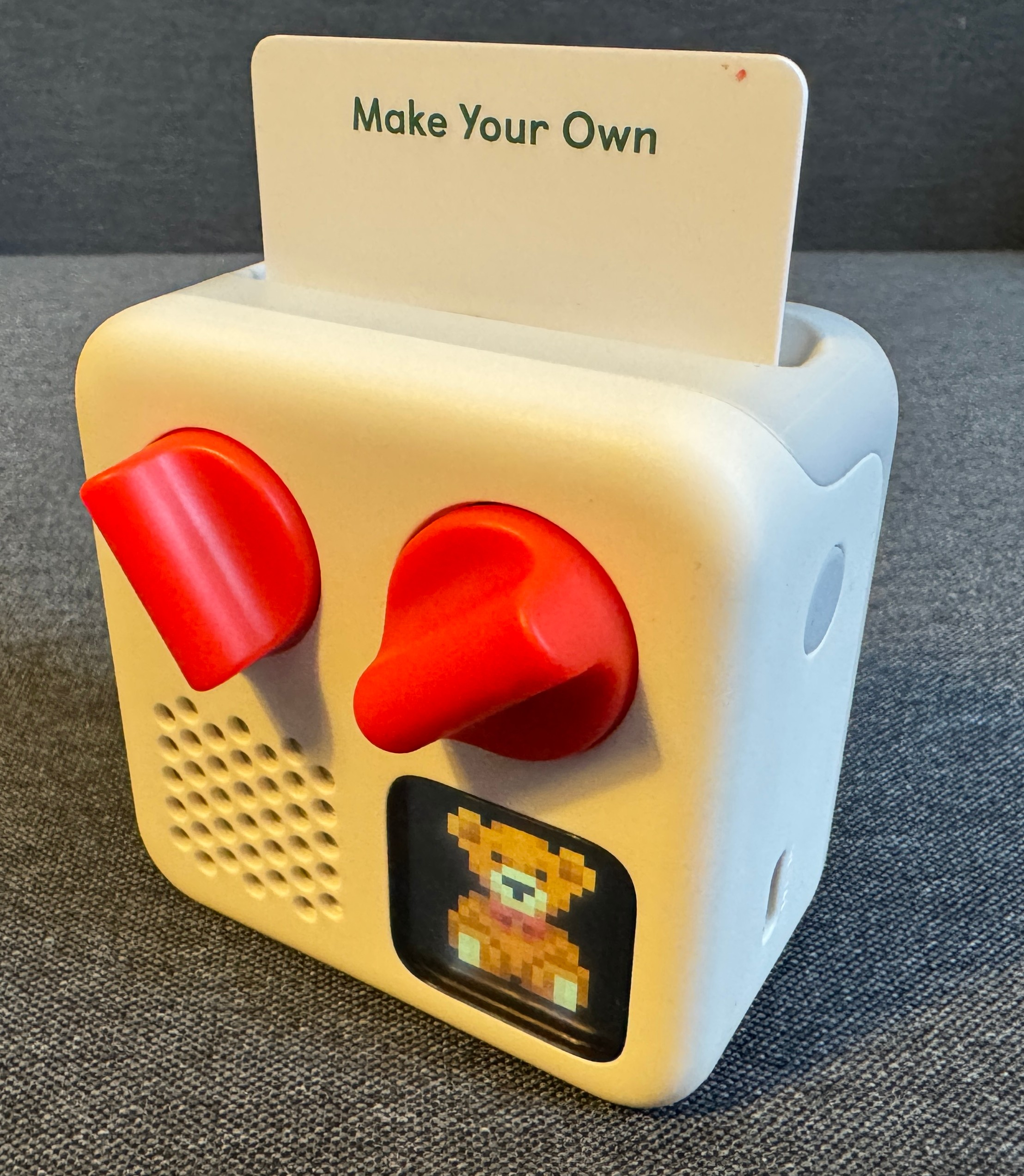
A Yoto Mini player with a "Make your Own" card containing user-provided audio inserted

Yoto is a brand of digital audio players for children.

== History ==
Ben Drury and Filip Denker launched the Yoto player in London as a Kickstarter project in 2017. In 2024, Yoto recalled some Yoto Mini players because of overheating issues.

== Features ==
The players are marketed as screen-free entertainment devices for children from 3 to 12 years old. They feature large, children-friendly controls and allow listening on a built-in speaker, on wired headphones or Bluetooth wireless headphones. There are two sizes of Yoto player: a larger one intended for home use and a portable "Yoto Mini" player.

Yoto devices play audio from physical cards inserted into a slot. The cards can be bought with pre-loaded content including audio books or music, or they can be manually loaded with audio files provided by the parent. The cards are not digital storage devices, but contain NFC chips which serve as keys to the audio content stored on Yoto's servers and accessed through WiFi. The player is able to store up to 600 hours of audio for offline listening.

In addition to audio associated with cards, Yoto devices play child-appropriate music and sleep sounds including white noise. Parents control the player's behavior and content through a smartphone app.

== Reception ==
Yoto players have received positive reviews by parents and testers. Alison Rochford wrote in The New York Times's Wirecutter that the player was "without a doubt, my favorite gift that my daughters have ever received", and it kept them entertained for years on end. Kathryn VanArendonk wrote in New York, a magazine, that "this audio player is parenting my children", and it is on "a very, very short list of kid-centric things I would instantly repurchase" if they were lost. In WIRED, Simon Hill appreciated the children-friendly design and content, but said that it had "just OK" speaker quality, limited battery life, and relatively expensive cards.
