= Susan Harrison (British actress) =

Susan Harrison is a British actress, writer and character comedian, who trained at the Royal Scottish Academy of Music and Drama. She has taken six one-woman shows to the Edinburgh Fringe one of which, "Creatures" was the recipient of a ThreeWeeks Editor's Choice Award. Harrison is a regular performer with Showstopper! The Improvised Musical and also performs with Mischief Theatre as part of Mischief Movie Night and Mischief Movie Night In. She has performed at London's Comedy Store with The Comedy Store Players.
