= Elizabeth Wilson (disambiguation) =

Elizabeth Wilson (1921–2015) was an American actress.

Elizabeth Wilson (or variants) may also refer to:

== Arts ==
- Elizabeth Cameron Dalman (born 1934), born Elizabeth Wilson, Australian dancer and choreographer
- Elizabeth Wilson (author) (born 1936), British feminist independent researcher and writer
- Elizabeth Wilson (screenwriter) (1914–2000), American screenwriter

== Fictional characters ==
- Elizabeth "Harriot" Wilson (c. 1762–1786), figure in the folklore of southeastern Pennsylvania
- Liz Wilson, character in the comic strip Garfield

== Politics ==
- Betty Wilson (politician) (born 1932), American politician in New Jersey
- Elizabeth Wilson (politician) (born 1964), American politician in Iowa

== Others ==
- Bettie Wilson (1890–2006), American supercentenarian
- Betty Wilson (1921–2010), cricketer
- Betty Wilson, final victim of serial killer Richard Laurence Marquette
- Lady Elizabeth Wilson (1907–2008), Australian activist, born Elizabeth Hornabrook Bonython, mother of Elizabeth Cameron Dalman
- Elizabeth Wilson (doctor) (1926–2016), family planning physician and right to die campaigner
- Elizabeth A. Wilson, professor of women's, gender, and sexuality studies

== See also ==
- Beth Wilson (disambiguation)
