= Murders of William and Patricia Wycherley =

1998 double murder case

Photo of William Wycherley released by police during their investigation.

At some point over the Early May bank holiday weekend in 1998, William and Patricia Wycherley were shot and killed in their home in a suburb of Mansfield, England, by their daughter Susan and her husband, Christopher Edwards. The Edwards then buried the bodies in the garden behind the house and went on to use the Wycherleys' identities to commit various acts of fraud intended to fund their hobby of collecting expensive Hollywood memorabilia.

The crime went undiscovered until 2012, when Christopher contacted his stepmother to ask for money and confessed. At this point the Edwards were living in Lille, France, having moved there when the UK's Department for Work and Pensions requested an interview with William Wycherley to assess his needs, as he would have been approaching his 100th birthday. They eventually agreed to surrender themselves to police at St Pancras railway station in October 2013 after travelling back to the UK.

The couple were found guilty of murder in June 2014 and were sentenced to life imprisonment with a minimum term of 25 years. The case was the basis for a 2021 docudrama miniseries titled Landscapers.

== Background ==
William Wycherley served in the British Merchant Navy, and married Patricia in 1958. After their deaths, the investigating police officers found only two photographs of William and none of Patricia. They could not trace any friends of the couple, and only managed to find relatives of William – some nieces – although they did not know him well at all. Neighbours described Patricia as "old-fashioned", and William as "like a Victorian father, head of the family".

Christopher Edwards met Susan Wycherley via a dating agency, and the couple married in 1983. Christopher worked as a credit controller and Susan was a librarian, although she gave up work after marriage. They lived in a small flat in Dagenham, East London. The couple shared a hobby of collecting Hollywood memorabilia which developed into an obsession; the couple purchased many expensive items that they could not reasonably afford, including spending £20,000 on a signed photograph of Frank Sinatra. Susan forged letters supposedly from French actor Gérard Depardieu to her husband, writing in poor English and using a franking machine purchased on the Internet to add a fake French postmark.

== Murders and concealment ==
William and Patricia Wycherley were each shot twice in the chest using a .38 caliber revolver dating from the Second World War at some point between 1 May and 5 May 1998; they were 85 and 63 years old respectively. The Edwards maintained that Patricia shot William before taunting Susan. They claimed that Patricia had said that "[Susan] had never been wanted as a child" and that "she [Patricia] had been having an affair with Christopher", provoking Susan into shooting her mother. At trial, the prosecution argued that this story was unlikely. They asserted that the ballistic evidence pointed to careful shots by the same, experienced shooter. Christopher had admitted in his police interviews that he had once belonged to a gun club, and thus the prosecutors argued that Christopher had pulled the trigger.

One night soon after the killings, Christopher dug a large hole in the back garden of the Wycherleys' house and buried their bodies in it. To conceal his actions, he planted shrubs in the ground above. Although a neighbour saw the hole being dug, they did not believe the act was suspicious enough to warrant informing the police.

The Wycherleys were not particularly social – one neighbour said that "[t]hey didn't mix [...] or communicate with anyone" – and so many assumed that they had simply moved away. The Edwards told anyone who asked that the Wycherleys were travelling. To keep up the pretence, the couple sent Christmas cards to relatives containing invented stories of extended holidays, forged replies to correspondence and regularly visited the house to mow the lawn, clear gutters and pay bills.

== Fraud and discovery ==
On Tuesday, 5 May 1998, Susan Edwards opened a joint bank account in her name and that of her mother using forged documents, and moved her parents' savings of just over £40,000 into it. The couple proceeded to redirect private and state pension payments, industrial injury payouts and winter fuel payments to themselves. They also took out personal loans in the names of the Wycherleys. The couple spent almost all of the money on more memorabilia, including many signed photographs of the actor Gary Cooper.

In 2005, believing that sufficient time had passed since the killings, they sold the house in Mansfield, again using forged signatures, for just under £67,000 in an attempt to pay off their debts. By this point they were paying creditors around £700 per month, but were still making memorabilia purchases of ten times that amount.

In late 2012, the Department for Work and Pensions wrote to William requesting a meeting to assess his needs. This frightened the Edwards, and they fled the UK, living for a year in Lille, France. Unable to find work in France, the couple ran out of money, and Christopher contacted his stepmother, Elizabeth, and told her the version of the story they would tell in court – that Patricia had shot William, and then Susan had shot her mother after provocation.

Elizabeth Edwards contacted the police, and an investigation was launched under Detective Chief Inspector Rob Griffin. After initial inquiries lent credence to the story, police excavated the garden of the Wycherleys' former home, discovering their bodies in October 2013. After brief email correspondence, the Edwards agreed to surrender to UK police at St Pancras railway station after returning from France on the Eurostar three weeks after the discovery of the bodies. At the time of their arrest, the couple were £160,000 in debt.

== Trial ==
Following a hearing in February 2014 during which they denied murder, a trial date starting 4 June was announced, and the Edwards appeared at Nottingham Crown Court. Susan pleaded guilty to the lesser crime of manslaughter, but denied murder. Christopher pleaded not guilty to the killings. The couple both pleaded guilty to two counts of interfering with the duties of a coroner and theft of a credit balance.

Prosecutors argued that the crime was premeditated, and that Christopher had shot both Wycherleys with the intention of stealing their money. A jury found both Christopher and Susan guilty of murder in June 2014, rejecting Susan's claims of provocation.

Both Christopher and Susan were sentenced to life imprisonment with a minimum term of 25 years. Susan applied for leave to appeal against her sentence in 2015, claiming that her father had sexually assaulted her and that the judge did not take this "provocation" into account. The Court of Appeal dismissed her application, with Lady Justice Rafferty stating that "the crown court judge was entitled to reach the conclusions she did when setting the minimum term."

== Media representation ==
In 2020, Midlands-based journalist Andy Done-Johnson published a true crime book based on the case, A Garden of Bones: Blood Runs Thicker. Done-Johnson had covered the initial story for Mansfield's Chad newspaper. The case was the basis for a 2021 docudrama miniseries, Landscapers, directed by Will Sharpe. Christopher was played by David Thewlis and Susan by Olivia Colman. The series received positive reviews from viewers and critics, and has a 98% rating on Rotten Tomatoes.

In 2021–2022 BBC Radio 4 broadcast a five-part documentary, "Bodies in the Garden: The Wycherley Murders", with a later update episode.
