= Ben Summerskill =

British LGBT advocate and journalist

Ben Summerskill OBE
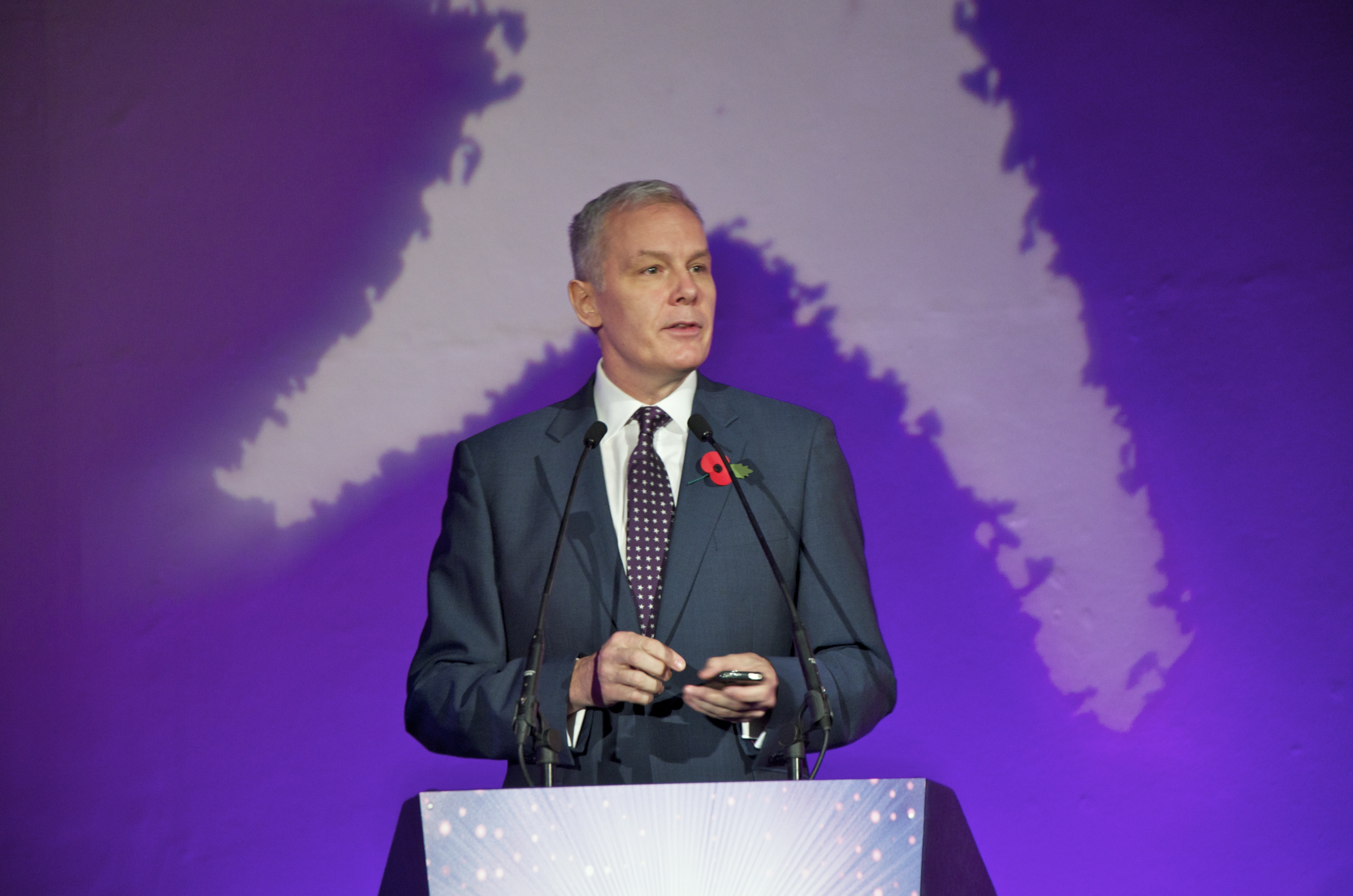
- Giving a speech at the Stonewall Awards, November 2011
- Born: 6 October 1961 (age 65); Kent, England
- Education: Cobden Road Infants School; Amherst County Primary School; Sevenoaks School
- Alma mater: Merton College, Oxford
- Occupations: Businessman; Equality campaigner; Journalist
- Years active: 1987–present
- Title: Chief executive of Stonewall (2003–2014)
- Predecessor: Angela Mason (1992–2002)
- Successor: Ruth Hunt (2014–2019)

Ben Jeffrey Peter Summerskill OBE (born 6 October 1961) is chair of The Silver Line and director of the Criminal Justice Alliance, a consortium of 135 charities working across the GB criminal justice pathway. He was the chief executive of the UK-based lesbian, gay, bisexual and transgender equality organisation Stonewall, the largest LGBTQ+ equality body in Europe, from 2003 to 2014. He has also worked as a businessman and journalist. Summerskill is an occasional contributor to The Guardian, The Independent on Sunday, The Observer, The Times, Time Out and other publications. In 2015 he won a Lifetime Achievement Award at the British LGBT Awards In 2017, he was appointed by the UK government to the council (Board) of ACAS, the Advisory Conciliation and Arbitration Service. He was first appointed a trustee of the Silver Line in 2017.

== Early life and education ==
Ben Summerskill's paternal grandmother (Baroness) Edith Summerskill and his aunt (Dr) Shirley Summerskill were both Labour Members of Parliament and government ministers. Dr Edith Summerskill, a former Chairman of the Labour Party, was an early advocate of Britain's free National Health Service and a vocal campaigner for women's equality. Shirley Summerskill helped introduce the UK's Sex Discrimination Act, as a Home Office minister. His maternal grandfather Sydney Elliott was a newspaper editor of various papers, including the London Evening Standard. In 1944, Elliott became Editorial Advisor at the Daily Mirror, where he masterminded its campaign to support the Labour Party at the 1945 general election.

Ben Summerskill has a twin sister. He was educated at Cobden Road Infants School, Amherst County Primary School, Sevenoaks School, where he held a scholarship, and Merton College, Oxford, where he was an Exhibitioner (holder of a junior scholarship) but which he left after two years without taking a degree. He later wrote in The Guardian: "I still recall being struck dumb on being shown, as an undergraduate, a note from an Oxford tutor to a successful candidate's father: 'Many thanks for lunch, and the trip in the Rolls.'"

== Professional life ==
His first career was in the restaurant trade. He was operations director from 1987 to 1990 with Kennedy Brookes, by then a publicly quoted hospitality company, responsible for 300 staff and an £18m turnover at the age of 26. Becoming a journalist in 1990, he rose to the position of assistant editor of The Observer newspaper which he joined in 2000 after having worked with Peter Hitchens and Peter Oborne as media editor for Daily Express editor Rosie Boycott, and the London Evening Standard under editor and mentor Max Hastings and other magazines.

== Stonewall ==
As chief executive of Stonewall, he succeeded Director Angela Mason in early 2003, expanding its work from parliamentary lobbying into other fields including workplace equality and campaigning against homophobia in schools. He led successful campaigns for the repeal of Section 28 of the Local Government Act 1988, the introduction of Civil Partnership for same-sex couples in the UK and the introduction in 2007 of protections against discrimination in the provision of "goods and services", covering areas from healthcare and housing to hotels and holidays. He also led a successful parliamentary campaign in 2007–08 for introduction of a criminal offence of incitement to homophobic hatred and a campaign in 2009–10 to enable same-sex couples to celebrate civil partnerships in religious premises. He also restored Stonewall to financial good health after a number of very precarious years. (Its turnover was £1.4m in 2003, during which it ran a deficit of £117,000, and £5.3m by 2014, with reserves having risen from £11,000 in 2003 to £3.2m and staff numbers rising from 21 to 75.)

Under his direction, Stonewall's Diversity Champions programme, promoting good practice among major UK employers, grew from 35 to more than 600 members, employing 5.5 million people between them, ranging from IBM and Tesco to all of Britain's armed services and MI5. Stonewall's Education for All programme, launched in 2005 to help tackle homophobic bullying in Britain's schools and universities, was supported by 70 major teaching and children's organisations.

In 2006, Summerskill was appointed a Commissioner on the Britain's new Equality and Human Rights Commission. He had for three years been a member of a Steering Group advising the Secretary of State for Trade and Industry on establishing the commission, which has statutory powers for the first time to promote equality for LGBTQ+ people. He was appointed an Officer of the Order of the British Empire (OBE) in the 2009 New Year Honours. He was appointed to the committee of the Queen's Award for Voluntary Service in 2009. In July 2009 Summerskill resigned as an EHRC commissioner citing differences over leadership with its chair Trevor Phillips. Five other commissioners resigned at the same time.

In 2010 he was a finalist as Ernst & Young Social Entrepreneur of the Year and in 2011 he was shortlisted as Britain's Most Admired Charity Chief Executive in the Third Sector Awards.

In November 2011 Anthony Ryan, 42, received an eight-month prison sentence at Liverpool Crown Court after threatening to "put a bullet in the head" of Summerskill. Ryan, whose sentence was suspended for 18 months, suggested that Summerskill start making "funeral arrangements".

In 2013 he was named by the Evening Standard as one of London's 1000 most influential people. Summerskill stood down as chief executive of Stonewall in January 2014. His resignation was marked by a Guardian editorial.

During his time at Stonewall, Summerskill attracted controversy over the organisation's decision not to campaign on transgender issues. The 2008 Stonewall Awards faced protests from transgender rights activists, but Summerskill maintained that the organisation should exclusively campaign for "gay men, lesbians and bisexuals". The policy of excluding transgender issues was reviewed within months of his 2014 departure and eventually reversed.

== Politics ==
Summerskill was a Labour councillor for the Westbourne ward of Westminster City Council from 1994 to 1998.

During his time at Stonewall, Summerskill frequently attracted controversy over the organisation's decision not to support equal marriage. In a departure from many others in the LGBTQ+ rights movement, Summerskill also voiced his opposition to same-sex marriage while serving as Stonewall's chief executive. Speaking at the 2010 Liberal Democrat conference, Summerskill suggested "lots" of gay people didn't want same-sex marriage to be legal. The event was attended by Lynne Featherstone, the minister for equality; Evan Harris, president of Liberal Democrat LGBT group DELGA; and Liberal Democrat MP Steve Gilbert, all of whom questioned Summerskill's comments. A poll commissioned by LGBTQ+ outlet PinkNews found 98% in support of marriage equality.

Following a backlash that saw a number of calls for Summerskill's resignation, Stonewall confirmed it would support equal marriage in October 2010.

Speaking to The Observer in March 2014, he controversially criticised the Liberal Democrats as having only supported equal marriage in order to draw "clear blue water" between their coalition partners, the Conservatives, despite Stonewall having not been in favour of equal marriage when the issue was introduced into the Coalition-led Parliament. Peter Tatchell was particularly critical: "Stonewall does great work but the gay campaign for marriage equality faced an uphill struggle, which was made worse by Stonewall constantly undermining our efforts. Some of the arguments Ben and Stonewall put forward at the time [2010] were quoted by homophobes to justify their opposition to same-sex marriage and this was hugely damaging. I am not a supporter of the Liberal Democrats, but on the issue of same-sex marriage the party took an early position, while Stonewall did all it could to sabotage that position."

Business positions
Preceded by Angela Mason	Chief Executive of Stonewall; 2003–2014	Succeeded by Ruth Hunt (acting)
