= Stonewall Workplace Equality Index =

LGBTQ-friendliness ranking of British employers

The Stonewall Workplace Equality Index is a ranking list of British employers compiled annually by the lesbian, gay, bisexual and transgender equality charity and training provider Stonewall. It is advertised as a "definitive list showcasing the best employers for lesbian, gay, bi and trans staff".

Companies are not automatically included in the list but have to opt in by forwarding detailed documentation to Stonewall; the number actually participating is between 400 and 500 of which only the ranking of the top 100 is made public.

The algorithm used to compile the list is not disclosed to the public, but Stonewall claims to have surveyed 91,248 employees directly for the 2017 edition of the list.

The index was launched in 2005 as the Corporate Equality Index, changing its name to Workplace Equality Index in 2006.

== Results ==
Year	Winner	Number of Entrants
2022	Macquarie Group	
2021	Suspended due to COVID-19	363
2020	Newcastle City Council	503
2019	Pinsent Masons	445
2018	National Assembly for Wales	434
2017	Lloyds Banking Group	439
2016	MI5	415
2015	Nottinghamshire Healthcare NHS Trust	397
2014	Gentoo	369
2013	Accenture	376
2012	Ernst & Young	363
2011	Home Office	378
2010	IBM	352
2009	Lloyds TSB	317
2008	Nacro	241
2007	IBM	201
2006	Staffordshire Police	164
2005	British Council	

== See also ==
- Stonewall
- Equality Act 2010
- Corporate Equality Index, maintained for U.S. businesses by the Human Rights Campaign
- Nolan Investigates
