= Corporate Equality Index =

American report rating LGBT treatment

The Corporate Equality Index (CEI) is a report published by the Human Rights Campaign Foundation as a tool to rate American businesses on their treatment of gay, lesbian, bisexual and transgender employees, consumers and investors. Its primary source of data are surveys but researchers cross-check business policy and their implications for LGBTQ workers and public records independently. The index has been published annually since 2002. Additionally, the CEI focuses on the positive associations of equality promoting policies and LGBTQ supporting businesses which has developed to reflect a positive correlation between the promotion of LGBTQ equality and successful organizations. Following the top 100 corporations that are publicly ranked under the CEI, participating organizations remain anonymous. For businesses looking to enforce and expand LGBTQ diverse and inclusive policies, the CEI provides a framework that allows businesses to recognize and address issues and policies that restrict equality for LGBTQ people in the workplace.

== Criteria ==
The CEI criteria are established by four main pillars: "non-discrimination policies across business entities, equitable benefits for LGBTQ workers and their families, internal education and accountability metrics to promote LGBTQ inclusion competency, [and] public commitment to LGBTQ equality". In the most recent modified CEI criteria, a fifth pillar is considered, where "businesses must not have any kind of involvement with anti-LGBT organizations or activity".

The HRC Foundation lists the scoring criteria as follows, stating however that "The criteria have always been intended to evolve as more employers adopt existing criteria and new best practices emerge."

1. Workforce Protections (30 points total). The company has a written policy of nondiscrimination that includes
  - sexual orientation (15)
  - gender identity and gender expression (15)
2. Inclusive Benefits (30 points total). To all benefits-eligible U.S. employees, the company must provide at least one insurance plan with the following:
  - Equivalency in same- and different-sex spousal medical and soft benefits (10)
  - Equivalency in same- and different-sex domestic partner medical and soft benefits (10)
  - Equal health coverage for transgender individuals without exclusion for medically necessary care (10)
3. Supporting an Inclusive Culture & Corporate Social Responsibility (40 points total).
  - Three LGBTQ Internal Training and Education Best Practices (10). Businesses must demonstrate a firm-wide, sustained and accountable commitment to diversity and cultural competency, including at least three of the following elements:
    - New hire training clearly states that the nondiscrimination policy includes gender identity and sexual orientation and provides definitions or scenarios illustrating the policy for each
    - Supervisors undergo training that includes gender identity and sexual orientation as discrete topics (may be part of a broader training), and provides definitions or scenarios illustrating the policy for each
    - Integration of gender identity and sexual orientation in professional development, skills-based or other leadership training that includes elements of diversity and/or cultural competency
    - Gender transition guidelines with supportive restroom, dress code and documentation guidance
    - Anonymous employee engagement or climate surveys conducted on an annual or biennial basis allow employees the option to identify as LGBTQ.
    - Data collection forms that include employee race, ethnicity, gender, military and disability status — typically recorded as part of employee records — include optional questions on sexual orientation and gender identity.
    - Senior management/executive performance measures include LGBTQ diversity metrics
  - Company has an Employee Group or Diversity Council (10)
  - Three Distinct Efforts of Outreach or Engagement to Broader LGBTQ Community (15). Businesses must demonstrate ongoing LGBTQ-specific engagement that extends across the firm, including at least three of the following:
    - LGBTQ employee recruitment efforts with demonstrated reach of LGBTQ applicants (required documentation may include a short summary of the event or an estimation of the number of candidates reached)
    - Supplier diversity program with demonstrated effort to include certified LGBTQ suppliers
    - Marketing or advertising to LGBTQ consumers (e.g.: advertising with LGBTQ content, advertising in LGBTQ media or sponsoring LGBTQ organizations and events)
    - Philanthropic support of at least one LGBTQ organization or event (e.g.: financial, in kind or pro bono support)
    - Demonstrated public support for LGBTQ equality under the law through local, state or federal legislation or initiatives
  - Contractor/supplier non-discrimination standards AND Philanthropic Giving Guidelines (5)
4. Responsible citizenship (-25). Employers will have 25 points deducted from their score for a large-scale official or public anti-LGBTQ blemish on their recent records.

== History ==
Since 2002, the Corporate Equality Index has been published by the Human Rights Campaign. It was originally modeled after the Gay and Lesbian Values Index, a rating system that was designed by journalist Grant Lukenbill. When the HRC modified it, it became a 100-point system, as opposed to Grant's 10-point one. In its first year, the Corporate Equality Index awarded its 100 percent rating to 13 businesses. Each year, there has been an increase in the number of businesses that achieve this rating. In the 2011 index, 337 companies received the 100 percent rating. The criteria for the index has changed since its first publication. Beginning in 2006, transgender rights issues became more imperative to the index than they had previously been; consequently, the 2012 index will include more updated criteria regarding benefits of partnerships and transgender inclusivity.

Following the introduction of the CEI, some participating businesses chose to remain anonymous despite the possibility of being ranked within the top 100 positions under the CEI criteria. The few organizations that chose to opt-out of CEI ranking publicity was due to concern of losing business and firm-value for supporting LGBT workplace equality. In recent years, businesses have outspokenly publicized their support for LGBT equality. Because of this, increasingly significant positive correlations between promotion of LGBT equality and firm-value have resulted. For corporations looking to broaden diversity and inclusion within its labor force, it “is about the power that an organization can derive from deliberately nurturing and integrating heterogeneous groups of people so that they fit together”.

With the success of the CEI, the Human Rights Campaign now also publishes a Municipal Equality Index (MEI) for cities, and a Healthcare Equality Index (HEI) for hospitals, also with the goals of fostering best practices regarding LGBT individuals.

== Effects on Corporate America ==
There are competing opinions about the effect that a company's rating has on its business. Some say that having a high rating will have a positive impact, while others say that it will cause a company to lose popularity among conservative customers. A study in Colorado showed that having a good rating in the CEI does not harm a company's stocks. The index also encourages companies to change their policies regarding LGBT employees, and in many cases accomplishes this goal. From 2004 to 2005, 91 percent of the corporations listed included transgender discrimination protection where they previously had not. Additionally, many companies are pressured to change policies that have earned them a poor score on the index, due to bad press. This has led to a competitive atmosphere among businesses to stay current in the latest LGBT-related inclusive policies. Larger corporations are much more likely to change LGBT-related policies as a result of the index than small or medium companies are. The Human Rights Campaign focuses on larger companies in the CEI, so smaller businesses are subject to little public backlash due to the efforts of the Human Rights Campaign and the index.

The dynamic growth of the Human Rights Campaign criteria for the CEI is necessary because LGBT legal protections vary depending on location, and broadening the criteria encourages inclusive modification of existing practices to ensure optimal anti-discriminatory environments. This process is done by acknowledging LGBT voices, and addressing their concerns. The CEI’s increasing popularity in relation to successful organizations has encouraged businesses to implement policies subject to the CEI criteria, ultimately attracting the pink dollar and increasing economic profits. Additionally, small and large businesses that go beyond their CEI ranking by integrating the views of LGBT employees and clientele entice innovation while strengthening firm-value.

== Consumerism ==
Since its beginning in 2002, the Corporate Equality Index has had a financial effect on the businesses included in its ratings system. In 2007, the Human Rights Campaign introduced a mobile guide for consumers, allowing anyone to see a company's rating before choosing whether to do business with it, simply by texting the company's name to the index's short code, receiving an immediate response.

Because the CEI’s criteria primarily focuses on aspects relating to larger corporations, smaller organizations are restricted from achieving similar ranking levels under the CEI. This actively demonstrates that businesses better represent LGBT people by addressing their voices and concerns alongside using the CEI as a general guideline for LGBT equality within the workplace. Furthermore, this implies that businesses have the ability to promote and support LGBT equality that go beyond the CEI’s criteria. Because of this, both small and large businesses are encouraged to discuss LGBT workplace policies and practices with LGBT employees in order to ameliorate diversity and inclusion.

== See also ==
- Stonewall Workplace Equality Index, maintained by Stonewall for United Kingdom-based businesses
