= Nolan Investigates =

Investigative journalism podcast

- Genre: Investigative journalism
- Format: Podcast
- Language: English

Cast and voices
- Hosted by: Stephen Nolan; David Thompson
- Voices: Robin Allen QC; Hannah Barnes; David Bell; James Caspian; Malcolm Clark; Benjamin Cohen; David TC Davies; Melanie Dawes; Rosie Duffield; Damian Green; Debbie Hayton; Owen Hurcum; Emily Maitlis; John McManus; John Nicolson; Sam Smith (BBC journalist); Kathleen Stock; Alice Sullivan; Nicola Williams

Publication
- No. of episodes: 10
- Original release: 13 October 2021
- Provider: BBC Radio Ulster

Reception
- Ratings: 5/5

Related
- Website: www.bbc.co.uk/sounds/brand/p09yjmph

Nolan Investigates or Nolan Investigates: Stonewall is an investigative journalism podcast, released all at once on 13 October 2021, looking into the BBC's relationship with the LGBT charity and lobby group Stonewall.

On 10 November, a month after the podcast's release, the BBC withdrew from the Diversity Champions Programme and Stonewall Workplace Equality Index.

== Series overview ==
The central focus is the relationship between the BBC and Stonewall. Claims of a conflict of interest arise from Stonewall ranking companies via the Stonewall Workplace Equality Index (a league table), and then selling their Diversity Champions Programme to help the company improve their ranking. Finances aside, there is another question as to whether the BBC can truly be impartial as they claim, while simultaneously vying for a good ranking by Stonewall.

Of lesser focus is questioning the legitimacy of Stonewall's status as self-assigned experts on LGBT matters.

== Production ==
Nolan reports that when he began the investigation, colleagues warned him against reporting on transgender topics.

The investigation lasted 18 months. All 10 episodes of the podcast were released simultaneously on 13 October 2021.

=== Reticence ===
==== BBC ====
While the podcast was produced by BBC journalists, the Diversity and Inclusion Department of the BBC would not put anyone up for interview. They did issue some general statements from a spokesperson.

Under Freedom of Information (FOI) laws, the podcast sought information about what Stonewall "was asking organisations to do to improve their ranking on the Workplace Equality Index". The BBC refused to release the information on the grounds that it could "have a detrimental impact on the commercial revenue of Stonewall".

On 11 November, following the podcast's release and the BBC's withdrawal from Stonewall, Rhodri Talfan Davies (Director of Nations at the BBC) was interviewed on BBC Radio 4's Woman's Hour. When questioned regarding the BBC's non-participation, he said, "I think with hindsight the BBC should've participated in that podcast."

==== Stonewall ====
Stonewall also declined the invitation to take part in the series. Like the BBC, Stonewall did issue general statements, but would not put anyone up for interview, nor directly answer any of the 50+ questions the podcast put to them.

On 17 October, four days after the podcast's release, Stephen Nolan reiterated the invitation to take part in the series by tweet: "We would like to offer another opportunity for Stonewall to be part of our podcast series. We would commit to creating an additional episode of Nolan Investigates, if Stonewall would like to sit down with me. We want to listen." Stonewall did not take up this offer.

== Episodes ==
	Episode	Summary	Guest voices
1.	The Brief	Introduces Stephen Nolan and how he began investigating Stonewall's relationship to the BBC.	
2.	Stonewall's Schemes and the BBC	Introduces BBC's workplace programs	Benjamin Cohen, Malcolm Clark, Rosie Duffield
3.	Self-ID and Gender Identity	Introduces the debates around sex and gender identity	Benjamin Cohen, Rosie Duffield, David TC Davies
4.	Being non-binary in the UK	Interview with non-binary politician Owen Hurcum	Owen Hurcum
5.	A gender clinic insider speaks out	Interview with Dr David Bell about the treatment of children with gender dysphoria at the Tavistock	David Bell, Emily Maitlis, Hannah Barnes
6.	Is Government Too Close to Stonewall?	Stonewall's proposal that the word "mother" be removed from maternity policies	Fr Tim Bartlett, Malcolm Clark, Benjamin Cohen, Rosie Duffield, Alice Sullivan, Nicola Williams
7.	Lobbying and the Law	Contrasts actual UK law, and how Stonewall presented the law in their work	David TC Davies, James Caspian, Kathleen Stock, Robin Allen QC, Benjamin Cohen
8.	The Debate	Interview with two very different trans individuals, Debbie Hayton and Owen Hurcum	Debbie Hayton, Owen Hurcum
9.	How close was Ofcom to Stonewall?	The relationship between Stonewall and Ofcom	John Nicolson, Melanie Dawes, Malcolm Clark, Damian Green, John McManus
10.	Is the BBC too close to Stonewall?		Sam Smith (BBC journalist), Benjamin Cohen

== Reception ==
Ten days after its release, the website Chartable listed Nolan Investigates as #3 most popular in news podcasts in Great Britain. It later rose to #2.

PinkNews, whose founder took part in the podcast, characterized the podcast as an attack on Stonewall.

Chrissy Stroop, in an article in openDemocracy, criticized the podcast, writing that it "plays up the same old transphobic talking points seen elsewhere" and characterized it as having a "heavy-handed conspiratorial tone".

Charlotte Runcie of The Daily Telegraph compared it favorably to other investigative journalism podcasts such as Serial, The Missing Cryptoqueen or The Teacher's Pet.

Joanna Williams of Spiked praised the podcast and Thompson in particular for tenacity in pursuing interviews and FOIs, as did James Marriott of The Times. Gareth Roberts of UnHerd condemned the BBC's lack transparency and suggested the podcast be followed up by "a full public inquiry with the power to compel the whole truth in detail from government."

=== Stonewall ===
Stonewall responded to the podcast with a tweet on 14 October, the day after the podcast's release, saying: "You might've seen a podcast about our work today. We make 👏 no 👏 apology 👏 for working towards a better world for LGBTQ+ people."

=== BBC ===
On 10 November, a month after the podcast's release, the BBC withdrew from the Diversity Champions Programme and Stonewall Workplace Equality Index. This decision also came almost two weeks after director general Tim Davie unveiled a new 10-point impartiality plan.

[O]ver time our participation in the Programme has led some to question whether the BBC can be impartial when reporting on public policy debates where Stonewall is taking an active role. After careful consideration, we believe it is time to step back from the Diversity Champions Programme and will also no longer participate in Stonewall’s Workplace Equality Index.

— BBC official statement

Stonewall called it a shame and that they would "continue to engage with the BBC on a number of fronts to champion support for LGBTQ+ colleagues and to represent our communities through their reporting".

On 11 November, Director of Nations at the BBC Rhodri Talfan Davies was interviewed by Emma Barnett on BBC Radio 4's Woman's Hour. He maintained that the BBC had not been compromised by Stonewall, but that it was about "the perception of bias." On 18 November, Chief Executive of Stonewall Nancy Kelley was interviewed on the same podcast. She called the perception understandable but maintained that it was no more than perception.

Multiple members of BBC staff and the BBC Pride Network quit their positions at the BBC throughout 2021, citing the BBC's continued anti-LGBT actions and specifically noting the Nolan Investigates podcast, the dropping of Stonewall diversity programmes, and the publication of an article claiming "some trans women are rapists".

=== LGBT+ organizations ===
Human rights campaigner Peter Tatchell stated his support for Stonewall in response to the podcast, saying that an "insignificant minority" were attacking Stonewall because that minority has "hostility to trans inclusion". He also said that the Diversity Champions program had helped in reducing "workplace discrimination, harassment and invisibility of LGBT+ employees". The spokesperson for the transgender youth charity Mermaids condemned the podcast and claimed that it was an attempt to "silence and undermine the integrity of organisations which stand up for LGBTQIA+ rights". The CEO of the Terrence Higgins Trust, Ian Green, compared this type of attack on Stonewall and trans people in general to the actions in the '80s and '90s against gay people by the creation of Section 28. The chief executive of the LGBT+ youth charity Just Like Us, Dominic Arnall, said that they were "proud" to stand with Stonewall in the wake of the podcast and that it is important to now "stand strong behind values that include rather than exclude", particularly in support of trans individuals as they remain the "most marginalised in our communities".

== Awards ==
Year	Award	Category	Result	Ref
2022	Audio and Radio Industry Awards (ARIAs)	Creative Innovation Award	Nominated	
2022	Audio and Radio Industry Awards (ARIAs)	Impact Award	Nominated	

The podcast was nominated for 2 Audio and Radio Industry Awards (ARIAs) in 2022. In the wake of these nominations, a letter signed by 166 audio professionals was presented to the Radio Academy, expressing concerns of transphobia. The Radio Academy did not rescind any nominations. Nolan Investigates did not win either of the 2 awards.
