= Angela Mason =

British civil servant and activist

Angela Mason CBE
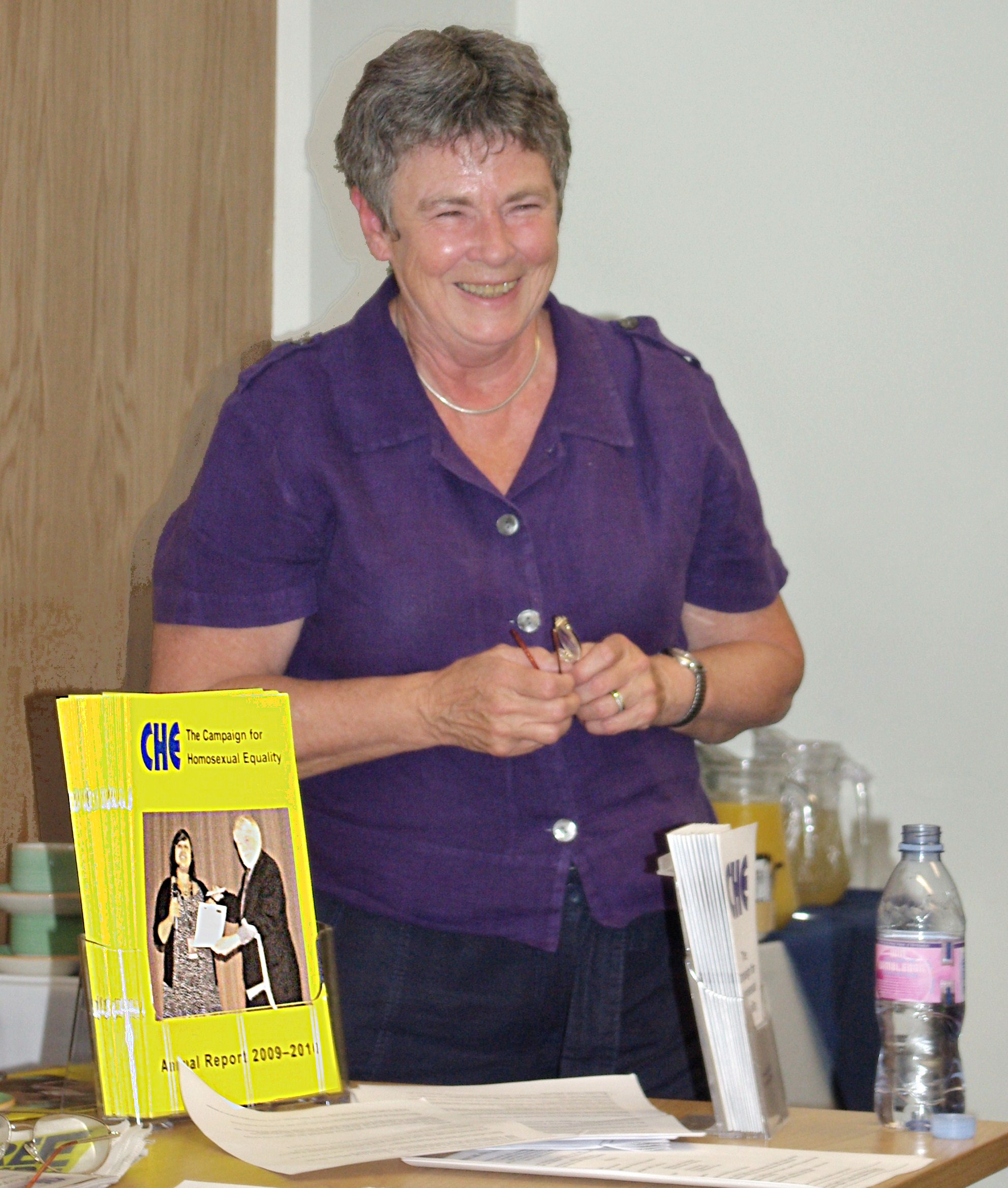
- Angela Mason, speaking at the CHE conference, 2010

Director of Stonewall (1992–2002)
- Preceded by: Tim Barnett
- Succeeded by: Ben Summerskill

Camden Borough Councillor for Cantelowes
- In office 6 May 2010 – 2022
- Preceded by: Benjamin Rawlings
- Succeeded by: Ward abolished and replaced with Camden Square

Personal details
- Born: Angela Margaret Weir; 9 August 1944 (age 82) High Wycombe, Buckinghamshire, England
- Party: Labour
- Spouse(s): William Mason (m. 1971–1980) (divorced)
- Domestic partner: Elizabeth Wilson
- Children: 1 daughter
- Education: Basingstoke High School
- Alma mater: Bedford College, University of London; London School of Economics

Angela Margaret Mason CBE (born 9 August 1944) is a British civil servant and activist, and a former director of the UK-based lesbian, gay, bisexual and transgender lobbying organisation Stonewall. She is a former Chair of the Fawcett Society, a UK women's rights campaigning organisation and a Labour Party councillor in Camden.

== Early life ==
Born Angela Margaret Weir in High Wycombe in Buckinghamshire, she grew up on the Isle of Sheppey and was educated at Basingstoke High School, Bedford College, University of London, and the London School of Economics. She was an early member of the Gay Liberation Front in the UK.

== Terrorism charges ==
She was one of the Stoke Newington Eight, who in 1972 were charged with planting or sending bombs which aimed to maim or kill government Ministers, their families and Conservative Party officials. She was one of the four accused who was acquitted following a long and still controversial trial. Mason still refuses to discuss the trial in interviews as of 2016.

Mason was an activist in the trade union and radical movements.

== Career after Angry Brigade ==
Mason became a lecturer at the LSE then the Principal Solicitor for the London Borough of Camden. She became a member of gay rights organisation Stonewall in 1989, becoming its director in 1992.

== In government ==
From 2003 to 2007, she was the director of the UK government's Women and Equality Unit, now the Government Equalities Office, with her high salary attracting media attention. Mason has also been a member of the Equal Opportunities Commission and an advisor to the Mayor of London, Ken Livingstone. Controversially she used her position as a senior civil servant to oppose one measure of legislative equality for gay people – protections against discrimination in the delivery of public and commercial services – in 2005 and 2006. She was, however, unsuccessful and the measure was passed in the Equality Act 2006. She was awarded the OBE in 1999 and promoted to CBE in 2007.

Since 2007, she has been an advisor to IDeA, a government quango which provides guidelines and regulations for all local authorities in England on equality issues. She was also appointed as chair of the feminist group the Fawcett Society in the same year serving until 2013.

In 2010, she was elected as a Labour councillor to Camden London Borough Council; she represented the borough's Cantelowes ward. She served as Deputy Leader of the borough council, and cabinet member for sustainability but was dismissed from the roles in May 2011. She was, however, reappointed to the council's Cabinet the following year, and was Cabinet Member for Children until her retirement from the council in 2022.

== Personal life ==
Mason married scriptwriter William Mason in 1971, they divorced in 1980 with Mason retaining her married surname. She is in a Civil Partnership with Marxist academic Elizabeth Wilson and has a daughter who was conceived by artificial insemination.

== Later life ==
- The archives of Angela Mason and Elizabeth Wilson are held at The Women's Library at the Library of the London School of Economics, ref 7EAW.

== See also ==
- The Angry Brigade
- Stonewall (charity)

Business positions
Preceded by Tim Barnett	Director of Stonewall; 1992–2002	Succeeded by Ben Summerskill
