= Patrick Strudwick =

British journalist

Patrick Strudwick is a British journalist.

== Journalism ==
Strudwick is currently the Special Correspondent at The i Paper, and the former UK LGBT editor for the news website BuzzFeed.

He was named 11th most influential gay person in Britain by the Independent on Sunday's annual Rainbow List in 2014.

== Awards ==
- Journalist of the Year at the Stonewall Awards 2010
- Winner of the Best National Newspaper Feature at the Guild of Health Writers Awards 2010
