= Lisa Power =

British LGBT activist

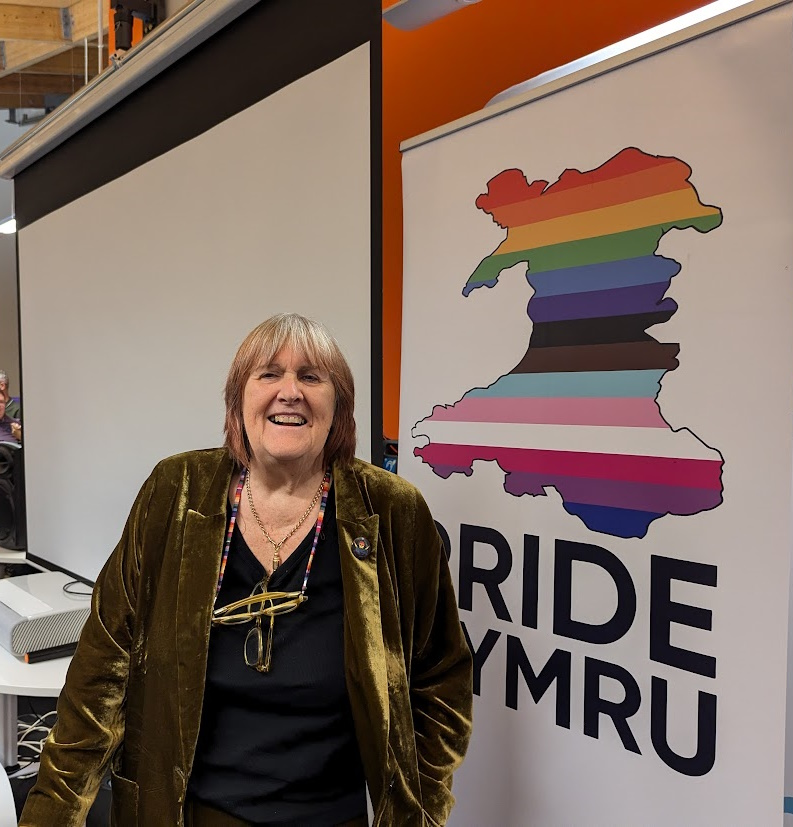
- Power in 2024
- Born: 1954
- Occupation: LGBT rights activist
- Awards: Member of the Order of the British Empire

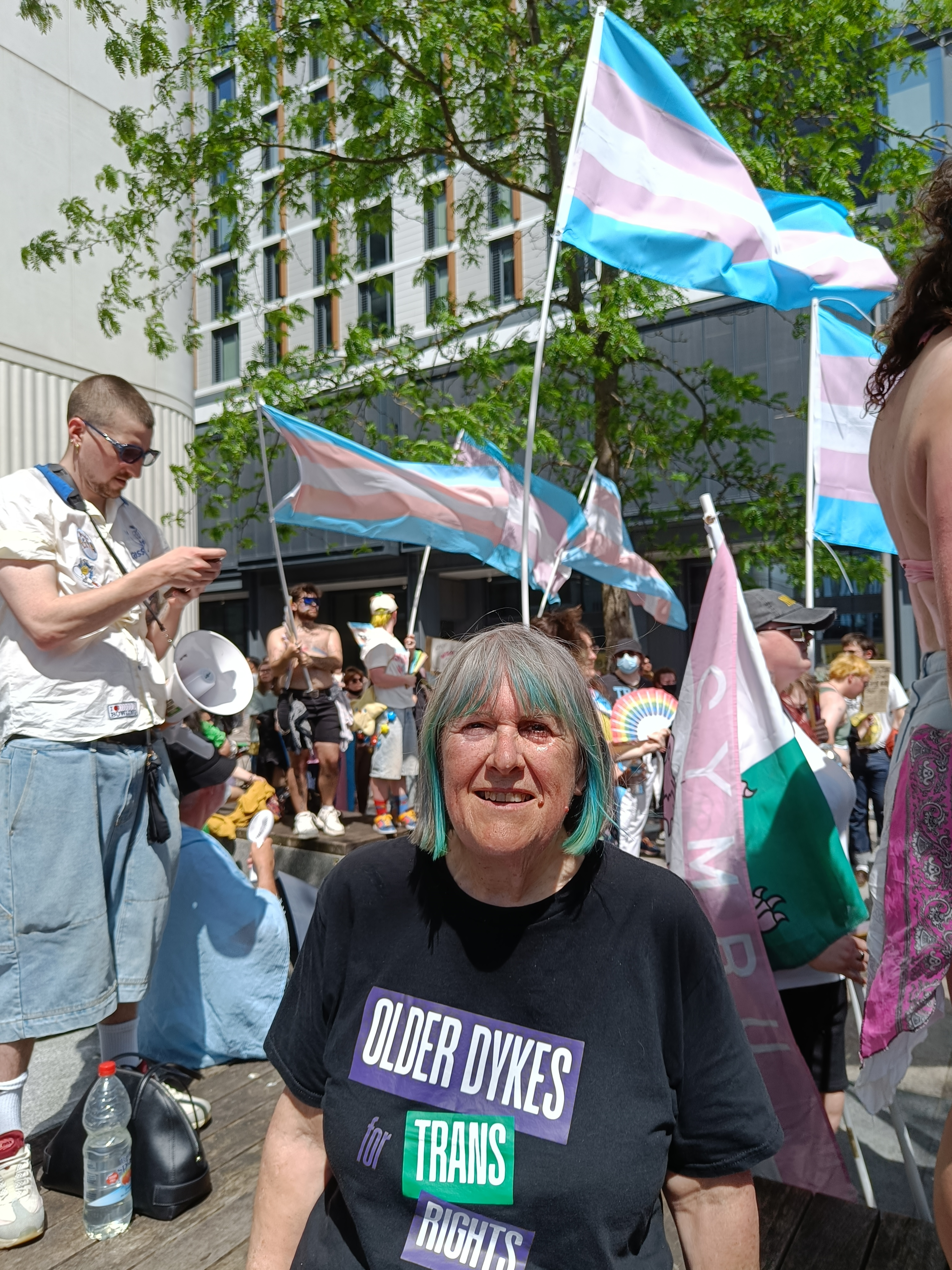
Lisa Power at the Cardiff March for Trans Liberation, 25 May 2026

Lisa Power MBE is a British sexual health and LGBT rights campaigner. She was a volunteer for Lesbian & Gay Switchboard and Secretary General of the International Lesbian and Gay Association. She co-founded the Pink Paper and Stonewall, later becoming Policy Director at the Terrence Higgins Trust. She was the first openly LGBT person to speak at the United Nations and continues to work and volunteer as an LGBT+ and sexual health activist in Wales with groups such as Fast Track Cymru and Pride Cymru.

== Early life ==
Power was born in 1954. She came out as lesbian in the 1970s. She volunteered at the Lesbian & Gay Switchboard in London. At the switchboard, she started to take calls about a mystery illness which became known as GRID (Gay-Related Immune Deficiency) and later HIV/AIDS. She was an early worker on the National AIDS Helpline and worked for Hackney Local Authority as HIV policy officer.

== Career ==
Power became Secretary-General of the International Lesbian and Gay Association (now the International Lesbian, Gay, Bisexual, Trans and Intersex Association) in 1988 after helping to set up the Pink Paper. She co-founded Stonewall in 1989 in direct response to Section 28 and subsequently was the policy director of the Terrence Higgins Trust.

In 1991, Power was the first openly LGBT person to speak about gay rights at the United Nations in New York. She was subsequently sainted by the Order of Perpetual Indulgence as St Lisa Potestatis for her services to queer life and her saint's day is New Year's Eve. She was appointed a Member of the Order of the British Empire (MBE) in the 2011 New Year Honours, "for services to sexual health and to the Lesbian, Gay, Bisexual and Transgender community" and was named on the 2022 Pinc List as that year's most influential LGBT figure in Wales.

In 2020, she collaborated with National Museum Cardiff and curator Dan Vo on a program called "Queer Tours", which aimed to uncover hidden LGBTQ histories in Cardiff. She was for several years the Organiser for LGBT History Month at Pride Cymru and Chair of the HIV Justice Network. She was Historical Consultant for the ground breaking Russell T Davies Channel 4 series "It's A Sin", has appeared in a number of HIV and LGBT modern history programmes and is a Founding Trustee of the Queer Britain museum. On International Women's Day 2020, Power commented "Women are raised with an inner voice of self doubt; tell yours to shut up and let you have a go".

== Selected works ==
- Power, Lisa (1995). No bath but plenty of bubbles: An oral history of the Gay Liberation Front, 1970–1973. Cassell. p. 288. ISBN 978-0-304-33205-2.
