= Cotton ceiling =

LGBTQ+ slang

The cotton ceiling is a metaphor for the perceived marginalization or desexualization of trans women in queer erotic communities. It has been used to describe a "tendency by cisgender lesbians to outwardly include and support trans women, but draw the line at considering ever having sex with them." The phrase is derived from the term glass ceiling, a description of how women can advance to a certain level in business but are supposedly held back from any further promotion or true seniority by sexism.

== Definition ==
The term cotton ceiling (an analogy with the glass ceiling and cotton underwear) was coined in 2012 by transgender porn actress Drew DeVeaux, referring to the feeling of being invisible as a trans woman in queer sexual spaces.

Natalie Reed writes that the "cotton ceiling" refers to the way trans women are perceived and represented:

For example, trans men are often openly regarded as being sexy and hot within queer communities, being the subject of things like calendars and pin-ups and erotica. Trans women, on the other hand, are almost never permitted acknowledgment or representation in such communities as sexual beings. We carry a sort of image of being stuffy, boring, slightly icky, and ultimately eunuch-like things. We're allowed into the parties, but we sit quiet and lonely in the corner. This ends up being a problem not in that we're desperately eager to be sexually objectified (we get enough of that from the straight cis male world), but that this act of conceptualizing us as de-sexed and unfuckable is directly attached to larger systems of oppression, dehumanization and invalidation we face.

== Response ==
In an article for Transgender Studies Quarterly, Eliza Steinbock analyzed the evolution of queer pornography and its inclusion of trans performances in the context of the cotton ceiling, concluding that the "trans pornographic ideal" developed in queer pornography mimics the way transfemininity is marginalized in queer erotic spaces.

Philosopher Amia Srinivasan describes the phrase—analogizing access to sex with workplace equality—as "deeply unfortunate". "Yet", she writes, "simply to say to a trans woman, or a disabled woman, or an Asian man, 'No one is required to have sex with you,' is to skate over something crucial. There is no entitlement to sex, and everyone is entitled to want what they want, but personal preferences [...] are rarely just personal."

=== Criticism ===
The term gained wider attention in March 2012, when Planned Parenthood Toronto (PPT) hosted a workshop called, "Overcoming the Cotton Ceiling: Breaking Down Sexual Barriers for Queer Trans Women". The small group workshop was attended by seven people to discuss body image, shame and trans-exclusionary radical feminists (TERFs). It attracted controversy from some feminists, who petitioned to cancel it. LGB Alliance co-founder Allison Bailey, a barrister, brought a discrimination claim against her barristers' chambers after she was asked to remove a tweet accusing the workshop of "coaching heterosexual men who identify as lesbians on how they can coerce young lesbians into having sex with them...". PPT director Sarah Hobbs said that the workshop did not advocate for sexual coercion, and instead explored "the ways in which ideologies of transphobia and transmisogyny impact sexual desire".

Essayist Rosie Swayne condemns accusations of the cotton ceiling being coercive, writing that the sexuality of trans women is so "policed" that entering into a discussion of the cotton ceiling will inevitably result in accusations "of being 'rapey'".

The Guardian's Sonia Sodha criticises the idea of the cotton ceiling as "inherently coercive", and argues that "in the case of lesbians and same-sex attraction, it is vital to re-establish the principle that it is never bigoted for a woman to be clear that she is exclusively attracted to other females."

== See also ==
- Attraction to transgender people
- Transgender sexuality
- "We're being pressured into sex by some trans women"
