= Bailey v Stonewall, Garden Court Chambers and Others =

British employment law case (2024)

Bailey v Stonewall, Garden Court Chambers and others
- Court: Central London Employment Tribunal
- Decided: 25 April 2022
- Citations: Employment Tribunal: Ms A Bailey v Stonewall Equality Ltd & Ors [2022] UKET 2202172_2020

Case history
- Appealed to: Employment Appeal Tribunal
- Subsequent actions: Appeal argued 14 May 2024; Decided 24 July 2024; Case dismissed.
- Related actions: Court of Appeal application granted, 11 December 2024 Appeal argued 21 October 2025 Case dismissed 18 December 2025

Court membership
- Judges sitting: Employment Judge Goodman; Mr M. Reuby; Ms Z. Darmas

Bailey v Stonewall, Garden Court Chambers and others is a UK discrimination case in 2022 brought by Allison Bailey against her chambers Garden Court Chambers and Stonewall. The Employment Appeal Tribunal ruled that Garden Court Chambers had discriminated against her in concluding that two of her personal tweets potentially breached her core duties as a barrister and awarded £22,000 in damages, but dismissed all other claims with regards to lost income or work opportunities due to the complaint. The Tribunal also dismissed all of her claims against Stonewall.

Bailey unsuccessfully appealed the claim against Stonewall at the Employment Appeal Tribunal, with the appeal being dismissed in July 2024. Bailey unsuccessfully appealed the claim at the Court of Appeal, with the appeal being dismissed in December 2025.

== Background ==
In October 2019, Bailey co-founded the organization LGB Alliance, an advocacy group which opposes Stonewall's policies on transgender rights. She acclaimed the newly formed group on Twitter and said that "gender extremism is about to meet its match."

Her chambers, Garden Court Chambers, announced it would launch an internal investigation after it received complaints alleging transphobia regarding her social media use and her involvement with the LGB Alliance. She was asked to remove two tweets, one thanking The Times for "fairly & accurately reporting on the appalling levels of intimidation, fear & coercion that are driving the @stonewalluk trans self-id agenda" and one stating "Stonewall recently hired Morgan Page, a male-bodied person who ran workshops with the sole aim of coaching heterosexual men who identify as lesbians on how they can coerce young lesbians into having sex with them."

Bailey alleged that Garden Court Chambers and Stonewall were in breach of the Equality Act 2010. She claimed victimisation and discrimination on the grounds of sex and/or sexual orientation, and gender-critical philosophical belief against Garden Court, and that Stonewall instructed, caused or induced that unlawful conduct.

== Employment tribunal ==
The hearing of Bailey's employment tribunal case began on 25 April 2022, considering a number of claims against Garden Court Chambers and against Stonewall. The tribunal's decision was published in July 2022.

In terms of the claims against Garden Court Chambers, the tribunal ruled in favour of her claim that Garden Court Chambers had discriminated against her by tweeting that complaints against her tweets would be investigated. It also ruled in favour of her claims that Garden Court Chambers had discriminated against her and victimised her by concluding in that investigation that two of her tweets had potentially breached the core duties of barristers. One of the tweets was about the concept of a "cotton ceiling" and the other regarded her belief that Stonewall has a dangerous agenda regarding gender self-identification. She was consequentially awarded £22,000 in damages for injury to feelings.

The tribunal ruled against her other claims against Garden Court Chambers, ruling that she had not lost income or work opportunities due to the complaints, nor that that Garden Court Chambers had a systemic policy of treating gender-critical beliefs as bigoted. The tribunal ruled against all her claims against Stonewall, ruling that Stonewall did not influence the complaints procedure or the policies of Garden Court Chambers. In July 2023, the employment tribunal ordered Garden Court Chambers to pay £20,000 legal costs to Bailey because of its "unreasonable conduct" during the case.

=== Employment Appeal Tribunal ===
Bailey appealed against the ruling on the claims against Stonewall. The appeal was heard by the Employment Appeal Tribunal in May 2024, and the appeal was dismissed in July 2024.

=== Court of Appeal ===
In December 2024, the Court of Appeal granted Bailey permission to appeal the Employment Appeal Tribunal's decision, as ordered by Rt Hon Lord Justice Singh. In giving permission for the appeal, Lord Justice Singh said, "The grounds have a real prospect of success but, in any event, raise issues of some general importance which should be considered by this court. In particular, an issue arises as to the correct interpretation of section 111 of the Equality Act 2010 which does not seem to be the subject of previous authority. There is therefore a compelling reason to grant permission to appeal."

The appeal was heard at the Court of Appeal in October 2025, with the judgment reserved to a later date. In December 2025 the Court of Appeal dismissed the appeal on all grounds, ruling that Stonewall did not influence the investigation by GCC or the discriminatory outcome.

=== Supreme Court ===
In May 2026, Bailey was granted permission to take her case against Stonewall to the Supreme Court.

== See also ==
- UK labour law
