= "We're being pressured into sex by some trans women" =

BBC News article

External link
- BBC logo "The lesbians who feel pressured to have sex and relationships with trans women"

"'We're being pressured into sex by some trans women'" is the original title of a BBC News article written by Caroline Lowbridge and published on 26 October 2021. Produced by the BBC's regional service in Nottingham, the article says that lesbians are being pressured into sex by a number of transgender women and cisgender activists. The article received widespread criticism among media watchdogs and the LGBTQ community for being transphobic. It drew particular attention for the inclusion of comments from Lily Cade, an American pornographic actress, who has been the subject of sexual misconduct allegations. Cade wrote a blog post after the article's publication calling for the "lynching" of high-profile trans women. Cade's comments were subsequently removed from the article.

Trans Activism UK, Trans Media Watch and at least one senior employee of Mermaids were critical of the article. An open letter with 20,000 signatories asked for the BBC to apologise. The Guardian and The Times reported that the article met backlash from BBC staff, including prior to its publication, while protests took place outside BBC offices. Criticisms centred on the inclusion of a social media poll from the anti-transgender group Get the L Out that was accused of having a low sample size and self-selection bias; it reported that 56% of the eighty lesbians polled had felt pressured or coerced into accepting transgender women as sexual partners. Critics also believed that Lowbridge's chosen interviewees had a narrow range of viewpoints. A Stonewall executive is quoted on the subject, as is the co-founder of the LGB Alliance, which was created in opposition to Stonewall after they began to campaign for transgender equality.

Chelsea Poe, a transgender pornographic actress, reported that Lowbridge interviewed her for the article but did not include her comments. She also reported telling Lowbridge that Cade had been subject to sexual assault allegations. The BBC initially assessed that the article met its editorial standards but that allegations against Cade should have been mentioned. However, on 31 May 2022, the Executive Complaints Unit of the BBC ruled that although the article was a "legitimate piece of journalism overall", it had breached the corporation's editorial rules on accuracy for not making clear the statistical invalidity of the Get the L Out poll and for the title misleadingly suggesting that the article focused on pressure from trans women. As a result, the article was subsequently renamed "The lesbians who feel pressured to have sex and relationships with trans women".

== Summary ==
The 4,000-word article was written by Caroline Lowbridge and posted on the BBC News website on 26 October 2021. It originally included quotes from Lily Cade, an American female pornographic actress, but these were edited out following later comments made by Cade about trans people. A Portuguese translation was published in Brazil.

Lowbridge wrote that "there has been little research" on lesbians experiencing "pressure" to "accept the idea that a penis can be a female sex organ", but that such lesbians reported pressure coming from a small number of transgender women and cisgender "activists". An anonymous lesbian said she does not "possess the capacity to be sexually attracted" to transgender women, and that she suffered death threats for saying this. Another reported that her bisexual girlfriend broke up with her after she declined to participate in a threesome with her and a trans woman, saying that she could not be attracted to any trans women. A third woman recounted a sexual experience with a trans woman that occurred after she repeatedly expressed that she was uninterested; although she felt that the experience was not consensual, she said that she did not tell anyone about the incident because she felt worried that she would be excluded from the LGBTQ community.

Angela C. Wild, co-founder of Get the L Out, commented that "the trans ideology is so silencing everywhere", and that lesbians "are still extremely scared to speak". Her social media survey of eighty lesbians found that 56% were "pressured or coerced to accept a trans woman as a sexual partner"; four respondents' comments are quoted. The transgender YouTuber Rose of Dawn, who started her channel over debates about whether it is transphobic to refuse to date people because they are transgender, is quoted within the article; one of Rose of Dawn's videos responded to comments by the transgender academic and athlete Veronica Ivy, arguing that such decisions are not transphobic. Debbie Hayton, a transgender woman who works as a science teacher, said she is concerned by "shaming" of cisgender lesbians and commented on how difficult it is to form relationships as a transgender woman. A New Zealand TikTok content creator reported receiving messages from young lesbians who are unable to break up with their partners because they are trans.

The article also included a quotation from a statement by the Stonewall executive Nancy Kelley, who said "nobody should ever be pressured into dating ... people they aren't attracted to", but that "it's worth considering how societal prejudices may have shaped your attractions". Bev Jackson, a co-founder of LGB Alliance—an organisation founded after Stonewall announced it would campaign for transgender equality—said, based on people who contacted her, that "a sizeable minority of trans women ... pressure lesbians to go out with them and have sex with them", although she was unable to provide statistics.

According to Lowbridge, the term "cotton ceiling" arose among trans people to describe difficulty in forming sexual relationships. The article states that several high-profile trans women had been contacted for the piece but that none of them had wanted to speak to Lowbridge. In place of interviews, the article summarised previously expressed views of two trans women YouTubers and the poet Roz Kaveney on the topic of the cotton ceiling, including one YouTuber who had already deleted the quoted video.

== Analysis ==
The article was produced by BBC Nottingham, a regional department of the corporation. It was subject to the BBC English Regions commissioning process, rather than that of the national BBC. Lowbridge, the author, said that she began investigating the subject after being contacted by people who said that they were concerned by pressure to "accept the idea that a penis can be a female sex organ". According to the BBC, Lowbridge's research "involved months of speaking to many people about the topic".

=== Range of views in the article ===
According to NBC Out, three quoted lesbians are "figureheads from groups that push anti-trans messages", including the LGB Alliance. Trans Activism UK said that the LGB Alliance had been "discriminatory towards the LGBTQ+ community". Of the sources, one describes specifically being pressured into penetrative sex by a transgender woman. Though she did not dispute this source's experience, Linda Riley—the publisher of Diva magazine—commented, "I have never heard from a lesbian who says she has been pressured into having sex with a trans woman", and that "this is not a common experience in our community". James Kirkup, director of the Social Market Foundation, counter-argued in The Times that it was "bizarre" to criticise the article without "question[ing] the accuracy" of the source. Kirkup later wrote for The Spectator that the article's quote from Stonewall amounted to "the country's biggest gay rights campaign group suggesting that homosexual women who refuse to consider sex with people who have male genitalia is comparable to racism."

The BBC argued that the report incorporated a range of views, including some from trans women. However, a member of Trans Activism UK commented that the article omitted quotes from cisgender lesbians who had relationships with transgender women. PinkNews' Lily Wakefield said it "does not contain a single interview with someone who disagrees that trans women are coercing lesbians into sex". The BBC was questioned by members of Parliament about whether proper journalistic processes had been performed prior to the publication of the article and why no interviews with trans people were included.

In the article, Lowbridge wrote that she had "contacted several ... high-profile trans women who have either written or spoken about sex and relationships", but said that "none of them wanted to speak to me." However, Chelsea Poe, a transgender pornographic actress and a former colleague of Cade, said that she had been interviewed for the article but that her quotes were not included. Poe told PinkNews that she was interviewed by Lowbridge in September 2020, who told her the article's topic was the "cotton ceiling", and that she felt "truly gross" after the "extremely baiting" behaviour by Lowbridge, who repeatedly asked her about "going on dates with people not into trans women". The BBC later confirmed to PinkNews that Poe had been interviewed for the piece but that her statements had been deemed not relevant to the article. On 31 May 2022 the BBC stated that whether a particular trans person is "high profile" is "a matter of judgement, in which there may be a subjective element" and justified the wording used in the article by saying that it was not "a serious inaccuracy" to describe Poe as not being high-profile.

=== Lily Cade sexual misconduct allegations and blog posts ===
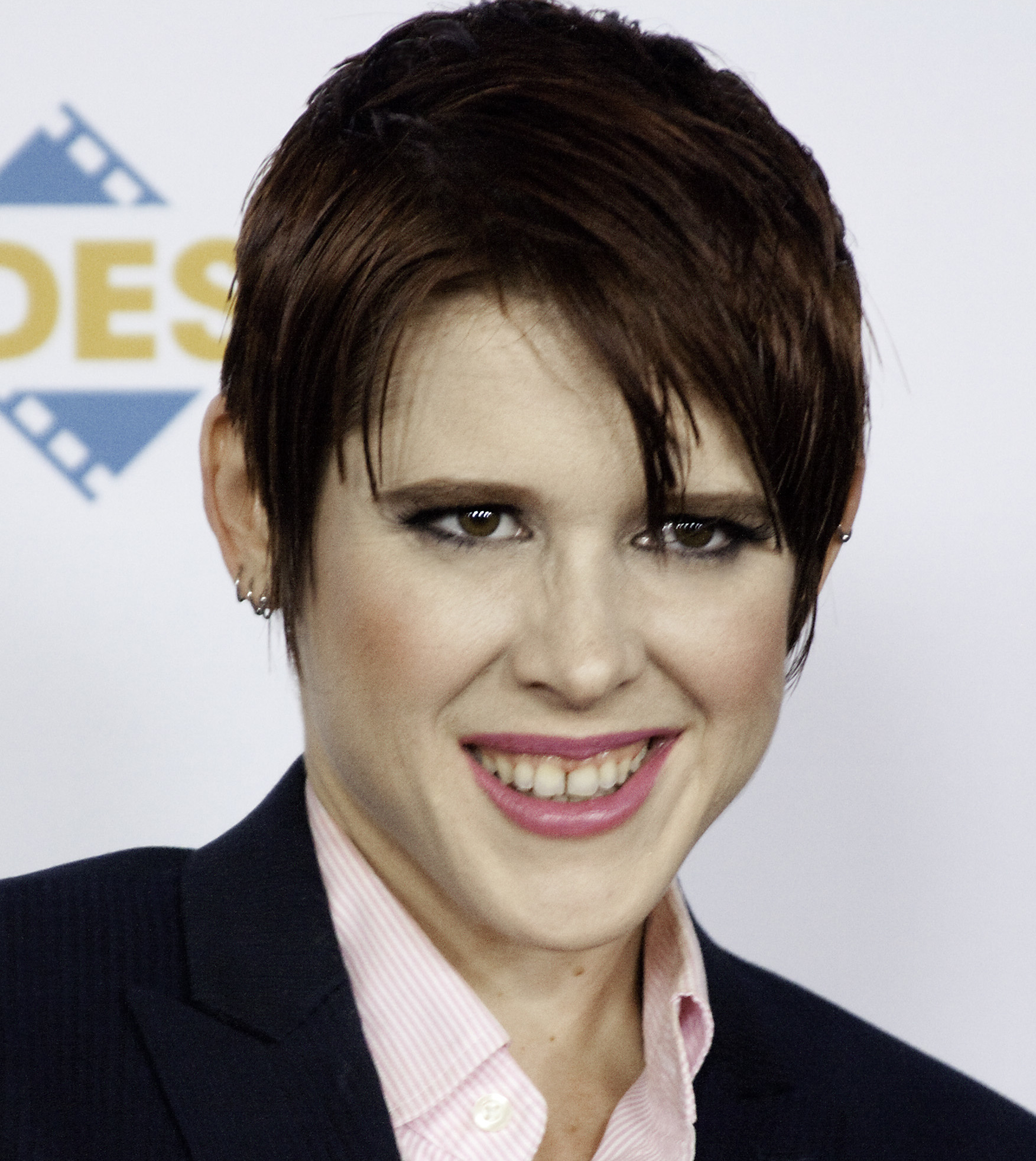
Quotations by the American lesbian porn actress Lily Cade were removed from the piece after she made death threats against trans people on her blog.

Lily Cade, an American former pornographic actress quoted in the article, had been the subject of sexual misconduct allegations. Cade apologised for the incidents in 2017, later saying that she had thought they were consensual and had stopped working in the industry after the allegations. Poe, another pornographic actress, reported informing Lowbridge of those incidents, but the latter considered the topic irrelevant and all content from the interview was omitted from the final article.

After the article's publication, Cade published several blog posts on her website calling for the "lynching" of trans women. She specifically named high-profile trans women within the post, calling for their murder, and wrote, "If you left it up to me, I'd execute every last one of them [trans women] personally." Her blog also claimed that a paedophilic cult controlled the Western world, and called George Floyd, an African American man who had been murdered by a police officer, "an annoying piece of shit." Cade later described transgender women as "vile, weak and disgusting" and referenced the Great Replacement, a white supremacist conspiracy theory. Consequently, the BBC removed all Cade-related content from the article.

=== Get the L Out survey ===
The article incorporated a social media poll held by the anti-trans campaign group Get the L Out. The survey, conducted in 2019 and titled "Lesbians at Ground Zero: How transgenderism is conquering the lesbian body", was self-published on the group's website. The survey introduction described the "lesbian body as a battleground" at risk of destruction, citing a quotation from Janice Raymond's The Transsexual Empire that said that "all transsexuals rape women's bodies by reducing the real female form to an artefact, appropriating this body for themselves." The survey took the form of a 30-question questionnaire, distributed among Get the L Out's networks, and noted that the results did "not claim to be a representative sample of the lesbian community." The survey received eighty responses, of which 48% were from within the United Kingdom. In the results, Get the L Out reported that:

- 87.5% of respondents did not believe trans women were women and 98.8% would not consider a trans woman as a potential sexual partner;
- 50% of respondents said they had been excluded from LGBTQ groups and 66% said they had been intimidated in those groups, mostly online;
- 48% said they had visited lesbian dating sites and 5% said they had had a sexual relationship with a trans woman; and
- 56% said they had been pressured to accept trans women as a sexual partner, mostly indirectly "with the general feeling that it is 'online everywhere.'"

The survey received criticism for its self-selection bias and small sample size; NBC Out's Jo Yurcaba found that it violated the BBC's editorial guidelines against using such surveys "in a way which leads our audience to believe they are more robust than they are". The BBC said that the survey usage was appropriate due to a lack of data on whether lesbians are being pressured into sex by some trans women.

=== Social context ===
According to The Times, the article was published at a time when the transgender community in the UK had already felt animosity from the BBC due to the release of a podcast by Stephen Nolan that investigated Stonewall. PinkNews said that the BBC is "regularly criticised for its coverage of trans people". They also reported that the corporation had previously been described as "institutionally transphobic" in an open letter signed by 150 people, including 3 MPs. In December 2021 the Council of Europe Committee on Equality and Non-Discrimination released a report that found that, in the UK, "anti-trans rhetoric, arguing that sex is immutable and gender identities not valid, has also been gaining baseless and concerning credibility, at the expense of both trans people's civil liberties and women's and children's rights."

Bethany Dawson of Insider Inc. said that "the UK government has estimated that trans people make up less than 1% of the population, but their sheer existence is a contentious topic for the media" and cited an LGBT Health study from January 2021 that found that "repeated exposure to transphobic content—such as articles that misgender people or trivialize trans issues—was associated with 'clinically significant' symptoms of depression, anxiety, post-traumatic stress disorder, and global psychological stress." V. S. Wells of rabble.ca wrote that "feminist-coded transphobia" rose in prevalence among UK mainstream media in 2017 after the Conservative government had a consultation into reforming the Gender Recognition Act 2004. Wells argued that the BBC article "is an obvious rehash of homophobic attitudes ... in the 20th century to argue for [queer people's] exclusion from some public spaces."

Charlie Craggs, who presented the BBC Three documentary Transitioning Teens, also argued in a Refinery29 op-ed that the article "depicted trans women as sexual predators in a way that felt very reminiscent of how gay people were talked about in the media in recent decades." A few days after Wells' article, CBC News reported that media coverage that included "assertions that trans people who have not undergone transition-related surgery are not real men or women or that falsely paint trans women as dangerous men" have been "spreading in the U.K. for years."

== Reception ==
Around 20,000 people signed an open letter by Trans Activism UK asking the BBC to apologise for the article, while the corporation received around 5,000 complaints directly and 6,000 messages of approval. Protests against the article took place outside BBC regional headquarters, including in Bristol, Cardiff, Manchester, London and Brighton; one London protest against the article was attended by the non-binary comedian Mae Martin, who accused the article of being "bad journalism" that has "[contributed] to a culture of hysteria that makes life scarier for trans/non-binary people in this country." The article also trended on Twitter. According to NBC Out, online criticism included "tens of thousands" of cisgender women, many of whom identified as lesbians.

Trans Media Watch said that the article was "fake news". Stop Funding Hate found the article "shocking". A figure from the transgender youth charity Mermaids commented that the article "contributes to the irrational fearmongering aimed at trans women, who have been relentlessly and systematically targeted by the media in recent years". A member of Trans Activism UK similarly said that the BBC had previously quoted anti-trans organisations and figureheads uncritically on multiple occasions. The Trans Safety Network said that one of the tweets featured in the article was a reply to an anti-trans hoax. James Factora of Them described the piece as "transphobic drivel disguised as 'research'". Writing for the same publication, Samantha Riedel raised concerns about the BBC's choice to target internationalisation of the article to Brazil, saying that "in Brazil, where authoritarian leader Jair Bolsonaro holds power, violence against trans people has surged in the last two years." According to i, the article used the term "cotton ceiling", a term "rejected by the transgender community" and "that implies trans people struggle to have sex because of their genitals." It originally described Cade as a "gold star lesbian", a term denoting a lesbian who has never had sex with a man that has been criticised for connoting that she is a more "authentic" lesbian than lesbians who have previously had sex with men.

The journalist Owen Jones called the article a "genuinely major journalistic scandal." The transgender newsreader India Willoughby said it was "terrifying" for the BBC to "repeatedly [suggest] you belong to a group who are a threat to public safety". Craggs wrote for Attitude that the article was "public fear-mongering that conflated trans women with sexual predators". Following an apology from the BBC for interviewing the transgender athlete Fallon Fox, Fox criticised the BBC for not similarly apologising for "[platforming] Lily Cade who called for my actual lynching" and said that "we will likely never hear [an apology] because the BBC is transphobic".

Shahrar Ali, a former Green Party politician who was removed from his role as spokesperson, praised the article for being "insightful" and "admirably exploring viewpoints from all sides." The anti-transgender rights activist Posie Parker of The Spectator called the article "thought-provoking", saying that the interviews featured in the BBC article are proof that "Lesbians are under attack from predatory men". Jo Bartosch of Spiked described the backlash to the article from LGBTQ people as homophobic, adding that "Astonishingly, rather than praise the BBC for giving column inches to lesbians to talk about the abuse they have faced, the loudest voices in the LGBT-plc world have not only condemned the BBC for the article, but they have also dismissed the testimonies of the women interviewed." BBC journalist John McManus compared the "excellent" article favourably to the BBC's coverage of child rape by Jimmy Savile. According to PinkNews, McManus faced "resounding backlash" for the comparison, with Jones saying, "This is a BBC journalist comparing trans people to Jimmy Savile. Beyond belief, frankly."

=== BBC internal debates ===
The Guardian reported that staff "are often deeply split on the issue of trans rights" within the BBC. The newspaper stated that some BBC London staff made a "pushback" on the article prior to publication. The Guardian described the piece as "the subject of debate for some time before it was published" and said it "was subject to extensive back-and-forth editing", as "bosses were acutely aware of the likely reaction to it on social media". According to James Kirkup of The Times, BBC staff protested that the article was transphobic, with "some younger BBC journalists" publicly criticising the article. At a "next generation editorial group" meeting with BBC executives, young employees spoke in opposition to the article.

Writing for Vice News, the former BBC LGBTQ correspondent Ben Hunte reported that a meeting was held between Phil Harrold, the head of the BBC director general's office, and around 100 LGBTQ BBC staff on 8 November over concerns about the corporation's LGBTQ policies, including over the article and over the number of resignations by LGBTQ staff in 2021. Hunte quoted one employee as saying, "People are getting to the point where they're asking—am I working for the bad guys?" In a meeting between BBC senior executives and BBC Pride leaked to i, head of news Fran Unsworth said that the BBC should have "thought harder about" the article and agreed that it would have been better handled by an LGBTQ correspondent. Hunte had left the BBC earlier in the year and not been replaced. During the meeting, Director-General Tim Davie responded to weeks of criticism over the BBC's coverage of trans people, including the Lowbridge article, saying "it is a serious issue if the BBC is perceived as transphobic."

=== Official BBC response ===
On 1 November, the BBC said that their article passed its editorial guidelines, replying to complaints that their "strong commitment to impartiality" necessitated "covering stories on any point of the spectrum of debate", and that the report "looks at a complex subject from different perspectives and acknowledges it is difficult to assess the extent of the issue". Transgender activists encouraged an appeal against this response.

On 4 November, the BBC removed Cade's comments from the article, stating that they had "[removed] a contribution from one individual in light of comments she has published on blog posts in recent days". The BBC went on to state that "an admission of inappropriate behaviour by the same contributor should have been included in the original article." Trans Activism UK responded to the update, stating, "The BBC quietly removing Lily Cade isn't enough", and that the BBC had failed to address that Cade was "a cisgender lesbian accused of the same crimes levied in the piece against trans women."

On 31 May 2022, the BBC released rulings from the Head of the Executive Complaints Unit (ECU) that stated that the article was a "legitimate piece of journalism overall" but that it had breached the BBC's standards of accuracy in two ways. Firstly, the headline "gave the misleading impression that the focus of the article would be on pressure applied by trans women" when the actual article focused to an equal degree on "internalised pressure experienced by some lesbians as a result of a climate of opinion ... within the LGBT community". As a result, the title of the article was changed to "The lesbians who feel pressured to have sex and relationships with trans women". Secondly, the head of the ECU found that the coverage of the Get the L Out survey "did not make sufficiently clear that it lacked statistical validity". The wording of the article surrounding the survey was subsequently altered.

== See also ==
- Anti-transgender movement in the United Kingdom
- BBC controversies
- Criticism of the BBC
