= List of BBC podcasts =

This is a list of current and former BBC shows that have been released as podcasts. The podcasts have been arranged in tables according to genre.

== Original Podcasts ==
=== True Crime ===
Title	Radio station	Release date	Ended	Ref
Fake Heiress	BBC Radio 4	1 February 2022		
Manhunt: Finding Kevin Parle	BBC Radio 5	4 February 2020	Yes	
Bad People	BBC Sounds	23 July 2020		
Fake Psychic	BBC Radio 4	1 February 2022		
Assume Nothing	Radio Ulster	19 February 2022		
Fairy Meadow	BBC Radio 4	5 January 2022		
Bodies in the Garden: The Wycherley Murders	Radio Nottingham	7 December 2021		
The Great Post Office Trial	BBC Radio 4	24 May 2020		
Gangster	BBC Radio 5	13 April 2021		
The Lazarus Heist	BBC World Service	8 April 2021		
Death in Ice Valley	BBC World Service NRK	26 March 2018		
The Missing Cryptoqueen		17 September 2019		
Sport's Strangest Crimes	BBC Radio 5	1 February 2021		
Paradise	BBC Radio 5	21 February 2019		
I'm Not A Monster	BBC Panorama Frontline PBS	13 November 2021		
Bad Cops	BBC World Service	9 August 2021		
Who Killed Emma?	BBC Radio Scotland	26 March 2021		
End of Days	BBC Radio 5	31 October 2018		
The Doorstep Murder	BBC Radio Scotland	22 May 2018		
No Body Recovered	BBC News	19 November 2019		
Where is George Gibney		13 August 2020		
Blood Lands	BBC Radio 4	14 September 2020		
Who Killed Elsie Frost?	BBC Radio 4			
Shreds: Murder in the Dock	BBC Radio Wales	21 February 2019		
The Orgasm Cult	BBC Radio 4	10 November 2020		
The Assassination	BBC World Service	18 December 2017		
Girl Taken	BBC Radio 4	12 March 2020		
Body on the Moor	BBC Radio 4			
Intrigue	BBC Radio 4	3 November 2020		
Hometown: A Killing	BBC Sounds	26 May 2020		
The Hurricane Tapes	BBC World Service	28 December 2018		
The High Street Abduction	BBC Radio 4			
On The Ground	BBC Radio 5	10 August 2020		

=== Life Stories ===
Title	Radio station	Release date	Ended	Ref
Desert Island Discs	BBC Radio 4	29 January 1942		
Death by Conspiracy	BBC Radio 4	16 February 2022		
5 Minutes On	BBC News	2 August 2021		
Uncanny	BBC Radio 4	12 October 2021		
Headliners	BBC Radio 5	21 September 2017		
Grounded with Louis Theroux	BBC Radio 4	20 April 2020		
Amol Rajan Interviews...	BBC Radio 4	9 July 2021		
Tony Bellew is Angry	BBC Radio 5	6 September 2021		
Stacey Dooley: Fresh Starts	BBC Radio 5	15 September 2020	Yes	
Eddie Hearn: No Passion, No Point	BBC Radio 5	28 May 2019		
Midnight Meets with Colin Murray	BBC Radio 5	21 April 2017		
Life Changing	BBC Radio 4	1 April 2021		
Short Cuts	BBC Radio 4	2 October 2012		
The Life Scientific	BBC Radio 4	11 October 2011		
Mark Andrews: My Love Letter to Wrestling	BBC Radio Wales	13 May 2021		
Dear Daughter	BBC World Service	25 November 2021		
Aberfan: Tip Number 7	BBC Radio Wales	20 October 2021		
Hope High	BBC Radio 5	12 March 2020		
The Reveal	Radio Scotland	16 February 2022		
Walking on Jupiter	BBC Radio 4	6 December 2021		
The Flipside with Paris Lees	BBC Radio 4	6 October 2021		
Descendants	BBC Radio 4	24 May 2021		
Legends Fall in the Making	BBC Radio 1xtra	2 November 2021		
Goodbye to All This	BBC World Service	1 October 2020		
The Localist	BBC Local Radio	21 June 2021		
Pieces of Britney	BBC Radio 4	1 July 2021		
Hooked: The Unexpected Addicts	BBC Radio 5	7 October 2019		
The Punch	BBC Radio 4	20 July 2020		
The Comb	BBC World Service	19 June 2020		
Hillsborough: The Full Story	BBC Local Radio	22 November 2019		
It's Not Always Black and White	BBC Local Radio	31 March 2021		
The Hayley Pearce Podcast	BBC Radio Wales	24 February 2021		
The YUNGBLUD Podcast	BBC Radio 1	29 September 2020		
Real Talk	BBC Radio Ulster	23 August 2021		
Unexpected Fluids	BBC Radio 1	8 May 2018		
Sex, Drugs & Lullabies	BBC Local Radio	7 November 2019		
The Disruptors	BBC Radio 4	5 November 2018		
1800 Seconds on Autism	BBC	25 June 2021		
The Naked Podcast	BBC Local Radio	10 April 2018		
Multi Story	BBC Local Radio	27 September 2018		
Building Queertopia	BBC	22 June 2021		
Hear Me	BBC	14 June 2019		
Pregnant Teens	BBC Local Radio	16 October 2019		
Make a Difference	BBC Local Radio	31 March 2021		
My Special Place	BBC	19 April 2021		
Life Lessons	BBC Radio 4	19 November 2018		
The Sista Collective	BBC Radio 5	25 October 2018		
We Can Change the World	BBC			
Fy Nhro Cyntaf	BBC Radio Cymru	16 November 2020		
Word UP!	BBC Radio Scotland	16 February 2021		

=== History ===
Title	Radio station	Release date	Ended	Ref
Evil Genius with Russel Kane	BBC Radio 4	5 March 2018		
In Our Time	BBC Radio 4	15 Oct 1998		
A History of the World in 100 Objects	BBC Radio 4	17 Apr 2020		
50 Things That Made the Modern Economy	BBC World Service	6 Nov 2016		

=== Investigative journalism ===
Title	Radio station	Release date	Ended	Ref
Nolan Investigates	BBC Radio	13 Oct 2021	Yes	
