= Beth Wilson (disambiguation) =

Beth Wilson was an Australian public servant.

Beth Wilson may also refer to:

- Beth Wilson (Shortland Street character) character from the New Zealand soap Shortland Street
- Beth Wilson (The Only Way is Essex)

== See also ==
- Elizabeth Wilson (disambiguation)
