= Simon Blake =

British social entrepreneur and activist (born 1974)

Simon Blake OBE
- Born: 1974 (age 51–52); Cornwall, Devon, England
- Education: Cardiff University (BA)
- Occupations: Social entrepreneur, activist, CEO
- Years active: 1995–present

Simon Blake OBE (born 1974) is a British social entrepreneur and activist. He is the CEO of Stonewall, a UK-based charity organisation that campaigns on issues relating to LGBTQ+ rights.

== Early life and education ==
Blake was born in 1974 in Cornwall, England. He was the first person in his family to attend university, graduating from Cardiff University in 1995 with a BA Hons degree in psychology. He has also completed multiple postgraduate studies in Social Research Methods and Executive Coaching.

== Career ==
Blake began his career in voluntary services roles, including work at the Cardiff AIDS Helpline and the Family Planning Association. He has since held leadership positions in several non-profit organisations, including the National Children's Bureau, and Brook, a sexual health charity for young people, and the National Union of Students. He has also served as a non-executive director of the Sussex Partnership NHS Foundation Trust.

Blake joined the social enterprise, Mental Health First Aid England as CEO in 2018 and left in September 2024 to work at Stonewall. He associated with Stonewall in various capacities for over 20 years including a trustee role for 6 years, working on issues such as the repeal of Section 28 and equalising the age of consent. He served as Vice Chair of Stonewall from 2015 to 2021. Media coverage has reported on differing perspectives regarding Stonewall’s influence and approach, with some commentators supporting its advocacy work, while others have raised concerns about its role in public policy discussions.

In 2024, he was appointed Chief Executive of Stonewall. Blake’s leadership has taken place during a period in which Stonewall’s role in workplace inclusion programmes and public policy has been the subject of public debate.

== Honours and appointments ==
In 2011, Blake was awarded an OBE for services to the voluntary sector and young people. He is a Companion of the Chartered Management Institute (CCMI), and has held advisory and ambassadorial roles, including the Headspace, and Dying Matters Campaign.

== Publications ==
- Sisters and Brothers: stories about the death of a sibling (2020)
- Sex and Relationships Education for the 21st Century (2014)
- Young Men, Sex and Pregnancy (2010)
- A Whole School Approach to PSHE and Citizenship National Children’s Bureau (2006)
- Strides: a practical guide to sex and relationships education for boys and young men (1998)
