= Sexual orientation and the military of the United Kingdom =

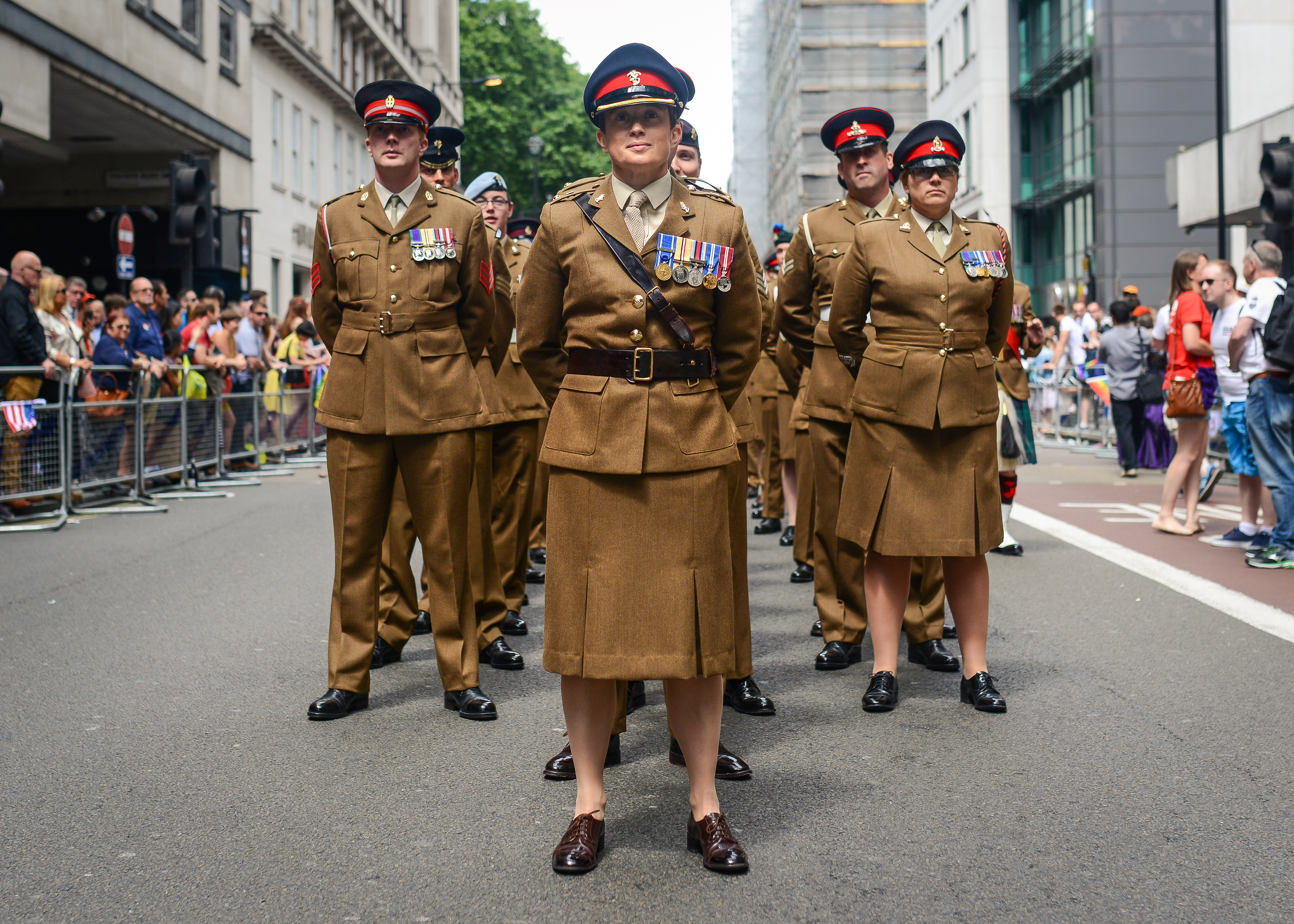
Soldiers participating in the parade at Pride in London 2015

Gay and lesbian citizens have been allowed to serve openly in His Majesty's Armed Forces since 2000. The United Kingdom's policy is to allow lesbian, gay, bisexual, transgender, and queer (LGBTQ) personnel to serve openly, and discrimination on a sexual orientation basis is forbidden. It is also forbidden for someone to pressure LGBT people to come out. All personnel are subject to the same rules against sexual harassment, regardless of gender or sexual orientation.

== History ==
Stonewall, a British LGBT rights pressure group, spearheaded the movement to rescind British military prohibitions against openly LGBT service members. Robert Ely, who had served in the British Army for seventeen years, was arrested in 1986. The discovery of a letter had led to his sexual orientation being disclosed and he was subjected to an investigation and thrown out of the army. He later approached Stonewall.

In 1994 Stonewall was approached by Jeanette Smith, who had been thrown out of the Royal Air Force, and Duncan Lustig Prean, a Royal Navy commander who was being dismissed. They asked Stonewall to arrange legal representation, leading to a long battle through the courts, with Graeme Grady and John Beckett also joining the case. Although the judges in the High Court and Court of Appeal said that they felt the ban was not justified they could not overturn it and Stonewall had to take the case to Strasbourg and the European Court of Human Rights before winning it. (According to a national opinion poll published a week before the ruling, the ban had been opposed by 68% of Britons.) The judgment of the Court was a vindication of the rights of lesbians and gay men and the Labour government of the time immediately announced that they would lift the ban. This took place on 12 January 2000, and a new general code of sexual conduct was introduced.

In February 2005 the Royal Navy joined Stonewall's Diversity Champions programme, followed in November 2006 by the Royal Air Force and by the British Army, the largest of the three services, in June 2008, to promote good working conditions for all existing and potential employees and to ensure equal treatment for those who are lesbian, gay and bisexual.

At London Pride 2008 members of all three armed services marched in uniform for the first time, whilst the Royal Navy had marched in uniform alongside other military colleagues in Proud2Serve Tshirts for the preceding two years. All three services openly recruit at gay pride events, recognise civil partnerships as equal to marriage and enjoy support for homosexual personnel at the very highest levels.

== Current policy ==
The British military actively recruits gay men and lesbians, all three services have deployed recruiting teams to gay pride events, and punishes any instance of intolerance or bullying. The Royal Navy advertises for recruits in gay magazines and has allowed gay sailors to hold civil partnership ceremonies on board ships and, since 2006, to march in full naval uniform at gay pride marches. British Army and Royal Air Force personnel could march but had to wear civilian clothes until 2008, now all military personnel are permitted to attend Gay Pride marches in uniform.

The current policy was accepted at the lower ranks first, with many senior officers worrying for their troops without a modern acceptance of homosexuality that their personnel had grown up with, one Brigadier resigned but with little impact. Since then change support at the senior level has grown. General Sir Richard Dannatt, the Chief of the General Staff (head of the Army), told members of the Army-sponsored Fourth Joint Conference on Lesbian, Gay, Bisexual and Transsexual Matters that homosexuals were welcome to serve in the Army. In a speech to the conference in 2008, the first of its kind by any Army chief, General Sir Richard said that respect for gays, lesbian, bisexual and transsexual officers and soldiers was now "a command responsibility" and was vital for "operational effectiveness".

The British Army, Royal Navy and Royal Air Force all require new recruits to undergo Equality and Diversity training and have a unified diversity strategy that is set by the Ministry of Defence – and which recognises everyone's unique contribution, their talents and experience. Core Values of Commitment, Courage, Discipline, Respect for Others, Integrity and Loyalty are their basic standards.

In 2009, the tenth anniversary of the change of law that permitted homosexuality in the Armed Forces, it was generally accepted that the lifting of the ban had had no negative effect on the operational effectiveness on a military that still considers itself world class, and indeed that it increased productivity by freeing gay and lesbian soldiers from the effort of hiding their sexual orientation. The anniversary was widely celebrated, including in the Army's in house publication Soldier Magazine, with a series of articles including the July 2009 Cover Story and articles in all the national newspapers.

== Law repeal ==
In 2016 the UK Government agreed to amend the Armed Forces Bill 2015-2016 to make provision to repeal words in two sections of the Criminal Justice and Public Order Act 1994 that made provision for a "homosexual act" to constitute a ground for discharging a member of His Majesty's armed forces from the service. This was as a result of evidence given to the UK Parliament by Professor Paul Johnson (University of York) and Duncan Lustig-Prean.

== Official apology to veterans ==
On 19 July 2023 the Prime Minister, Rishi Sunak, and the Defence Secretary, Ben Wallace, issued a formal apology on behalf of the UK Government for the treatment of LGBT veterans, following the release of an independent review into historic discrimination chaired by Lord Etherton, the UK's first openly gay judge.

== Couples' benefits ==
After the legalisation of gay civil partnerships in Britain, His Majesty's Armed Forces immediately recognised civil partnerships and granted married gay couples exactly the same rights to allowances and housing as straight couples. The Ministry of Defence stated "We're pleased personnel registered in a same sex relationship now have equal rights to married couples."

Spouses in civil partnerships are entitled to spousal benefits (including life insurance benefits, pensions, employment benefits), immigration equality, and similar recognition as opposite-sex military spouses for tax purposes. Civil partners are also allowed accommodation in military housing, security clearance and allowances.

== HIV Military policy ==
Since December 2021 the UK Military has allowed HIV-positive individuals to be retained and/or join if needed be - provided that they are “on a PREP undetectable viral load medication system”. Prior to December 2021 HIV-positive individuals were outright “prohibited from any UK Military roles whatsoever”.
