= Elizabeth Wilson (doctor) =

Doctor active in family planning; right-to-die campaigner

Elizabeth "Libby" Stanfield Bell Wilson
- Born: 3 June 1926; Surrey, England
- Died: 29 March 2016 (aged 89); Glasgow, Scotland
- Education: King's College, London
- Occupation: general practitioner
- Years active: 1950–1990
- Known for: women's health, right to die campaigner
- Spouse: Dr Graham Wilson (m. 1949; died 1977)
- Children: 5 daughters, 2 sons
- Medical career
- Institutions: Family Planning Association; Glasgow Family Planning Service; Marie Stopes International
- Sub-specialties: family planning

Elizabeth Stanfield Bell Wilson (3 June 1926 – 29 March 2016) was a family planning physician and right to die campaigner. She founded the 408 Clinic, a women's health centre in Sheffield, and was a founder member of FATE (Friends at the End), an organisation lobby for a change in legislation to allow assisted dying. In 2009, she was arrested by police in Surrey on suspicion of advising a woman who had advanced multiple sclerosis on how to end her life.

== Early life ==
Elizabeth (nickname, "Libby") Stanfield Bell Wilson was born in Surrey on 3 June 1926, the eldest of the three children of Lucy (née Stanfield) and James Bell Nicoll, a physician and medical missionary. The family moved to Aviemore in 1936, after her father secured an appointment there. They lived there for two years before returning to Wonersh, near Guildford, where they lived for another two years. During the Blitz, Wilson was evacuated along with her mother and siblings to the village of Penpont in Dumfriesshire. She was educated at St Catherine's School near Guildford before going on to study medicine at King's College, London. She graduated from King's College Hospital Medical School in 1949.

== Career ==
She worked as a general practitioner in Sheffield, setting up a Family planning clinic, known as the 408 Clinic, in the city's east end. The clinic attracted controversy as it provided contraception to unmarried women. After moving to Glasgow she worked in the Family Planning Association advising women, particularly those from deprived areas, on sexual health, contraception and abortion. On a visit to Hong Kong, she witnessed the effectiveness of the contraceptive medroxyprogesterone acetate, and on her return to Glasgow, she reviewed the benefits and contraindications of the drug, and began offering it in her clinics. It was likely that it was being used by more women in Glasgow than in any other city in the UK. Wilson retired in 1990 as clinical co-coordinator of the Glasgow Family Planning Service. In her time as family planning physician, her patients welcomed her straightforward approach to discussing sexual health, and the advice and care she provided.

After her retirement, Wilson worked for a year in Sierra Leone with Marie Stopes International, providing advice and support on women's sexual health.

In 1995, Wilson published a memoir of her time spent in Sierra Leone Unexpected always happen: journal of a doctor in Sierra-Leone (ISBN 1874640173), and in 2004, Wilson published her autobiography Sex on the rates: memoirs of a family planning doctor (ISBN 1902831705).

=== Activism ===
Wilson was an active in the right to die campaign. She was a member of the Voluntary Euthanasia Society, and in 2000, she was one of the founding members of Friends at the End (FATE), a Glasgow-based organisation that lobbied for the law to be changed to allow for assisted dying, and gave advice to those wanting to end their lives. FATE supported Margo MacDonald's 2015 assisted suicide bill in the Scottish Parliament. Despite the bill being defeated Wilson was pleased that it had raised the level of awareness and debate on the topic.

In September 2009, Wilson was arrested by Surrey police on suspicion of advising Cari Loder, who was suffering from advanced multiple sclerosis, on how to end her life. Loder, a former university lecturer, committed suicide on 8 June 2008. Wilson, in her role as FATE medical advisor had spoken with Loder. Keir Starmer, the then Director of Public Prosecutions for England and Wales, required her detention to seek a "clarification" of the legal position on assisted suicide. She was detained in a cell, interviewed, and released without charge.

== Family and personal life ==
Wilson met Dr Graham Wilson, a University of Edinburgh graduate and RAF veteran, at St Mary's Hospital, London where he was working as a research fellow. In 1949, they married in Wonersh Church. They moved from London to Sheffield, where their 7 children were born. In 1967, they moved to Glasgow when her husband took up the Chair of Regius Professor of Medicine at the University of Glasgow. The marriage lasted 28 years until Graham Wilson's death from stomach cancer in 1977, a day before his 60th birthday.

One of her children, Anne, died in infancy, and two went on to become doctors.

Wilson was a keen traveller, regularly travelling to visit friends and family all over the UK, and her brother and sister in Australia. She was expert at Crossword puzzles, and while detained in a police cell in 2009, she had her pen removed preventing from completing the Guardian crossword, an action which infuriated her.

== Awards and honours ==
In 2007, she received George Bell Award from the Scottish Academy of Merit with the for services to medicine.
