= Elizabeth Wilson (author) =

British independent researcher and writer (born 1936)

Elizabeth Wilson (born 1936) is a British scholar best known for her writing on feminism and popular culture. She was a professor at University of North London and the London College of Fashion. She has written books on feminist politics, fashion history, urban life, and popular culture. Her novels The Twilight Hour, War Damage, The Girl in Berlin, and She Died Young were published by Serpent's Tail. She has written for The Guardian and New Statesman and was a frequent broadcaster on BBC Radio 4.

== Life ==
In her early life, Elizabeth Wilson's family was employed in positions in the government of the British Empire. She was educated at St Paul's Girls' School and St Anne's College. She trained as a psychiatric social worker at the London School of Economics. She worked as a social worker for 10 years, but became frustrated by the conservative morality surrounding psychoanalysis and moved on to academia.

From 1987 to 2001, Wilson taught cultural studies at the University of North London (now London Metropolitan University). She was a visiting professor at Stanford University (1985), Goldsmiths College (2003–2006), London College of Fashion (2004–2013), and Stockholm University (2007–2010).

Wilson and her partner Angela Mason were both active women's liberation movement figures in the UK. They were members of the Communist Party 1974–1990 and were campaigners for YBA Wife, Rights of Women, the National Abortion Campaign, and Women's Aid. In 1984, Wilson became a co-parent when Mason gave birth to their daughter. Together with Mason, she wrote Hidden Agendas: Theory, Politics, and Experience in the Women's Movement, published in 1986.

Wilson was a prominent member of the campaign group Feminists Against Censorship. Wilson wrote for underground papers of the late 1960s and early 1970s, including Frendz, Come Togetherm and Red Rag. She was a founding member of the editorial group of Feminist Review (1979–1985) and a member of the editorial board of the New Left Review (1990–1992). From 1990 to 1993, she was a member of the executive committee of Liberty, also called the National Council for Civil Liberties. Later in life, she joined the Green Party. She also wrote for The Guardian, the New Statesman, and New Left Review, as well as broadcasting for television and radio.

From 1998 to 2005, she was a board member for the Deutscher Memorial Prize. In 2012, she was a trustee for the London Library.

Her books Adorned in Dreams: Fashion and Modernity, The Sphinx in the City: Urban Life the Control of Disorder and Women, Bohemians: The Glamorous Outcasts, Cultural Passions, and Love Game: A History of Tennis from Victorian Pastime to Global Phenomenon are united by a focus on the importance of aesthetics in modern life. Wilson has written about the ways in which people use clothing to assert or challenge authority.

Wilson’s fiction writing is primarily made up of a series of linked crime novels set in the late 1940s and 1950s, exploring the changes of London after 1945. Titles include: The Twilight Hour, War Damage, The Girl in Berlin, and She Died Young.

== Reception ==
In an article for the journal Historical Materialism, Stefan Kipfer and Kanishka Goonewardena wrote: "The Sphinx in the City is an impressively wide-ranging survey of the gendered and sexualised contradictions of urban modernity."

Wilson's third novel, The Twilight Hour, was well-reviewed by The Independent and received a mixed review from Kirkus Reviews.

== Works ==
=== Non-fiction books ===
==== As author ====
- Love Game: A History of Tennis, from Victorian Pastime to Global Phenomenon, 2014
- Cultural Passions: Fans, Aesthetes and Tarot Readers, 2013
- Adorned in Dreams: Fashion and Modernity, 2003
- Bohemians: The Glamorous Outcasts, 2000
- The Contradictions of Culture: Cities, Culture, Women, 2000
- The Sphinx in the City: Urban Life, the Control of Disorder and Women, 1992
- Through the Looking Glass: A History of Dress from 1860 to the Present Day, 1989 (with Lou Taylor)
- Hidden Agendas: Theory, Politics and Experience in the Women's Movement, 1986 (with Angela Mason)
- Adorned in Dreams: Fashion and Modernity, 1985
- What Is to Be Done About Violence Against Women?, 1982
- Only Halfway to Paradise: Women in Postwar Britain, 1945-1968, 1980
- Women and the Welfare State, 1977

==== As co-editor ====
- Body Dressing, 2001 (co-editor with Joanne Entwistle)
- Defining Dress: Dress as Object, Meaning, and Identity, 1999 (co-editor with Amy de la Haye)
- Chic Thrills: A Fashion Reader, 1992 (co-editor with Juliet Ash)
- Pornography and Feminism: The Case Against Censorship, 1991 (co-editor with Gillian Rogerson)

=== Other books ===
- She Died Young: A Life in Fragments, 2015
- The Girl in Berlin, 2012
- War Damage, 2009
- The Twilight Hour, 2006
- The Lost Time Cafe, 1993
- Hallucinations: Life in the Postmodern City, 1988
- Mirror Writing: An Autobiography, 1983

=== Selected articles ===
- "Magic Fashion". Fashion Theory. 8 (4). 2004.
- "The British Women's Movement". New Left Review. 1 (148). With Angela Weir. November–December 1984.
