= Stonewall Awards =

Award for people who impact LGBT lives

The Stonewall Awards was an annual event held by the British charity Stonewall to recognise people who have affected the lives of British lesbian, gay, bi and trans people. The event was first held in 2006 at the Royal Academy of Arts and from 2007 was held at the Victoria and Albert Museum. It was held for the final time, with '...of the Decade' categories, in 2015.

== 2006 ==
The inaugural event was held at the Royal Academy of Arts.

Award	Winner(s)
Publication of the Year	PinkNews
Politician of the Year	Baroness Ashton
Writer of the Year	Sarah Waters
Employer of the Year	Staffordshire Police
Bully of the Year	Chris Moyles
Journalist of the Year	Jonathan Oliver
Broadcast of the Year	Sugar Rush
Stonewall & Barclays Community Group of the Year	The Albert Kennedy Trust
Entertainer of the Year	John Barrowman
Hero of the Year	Sheri Dobrowski

== 2007 ==
Award	Winner(s)
Publication of the Year	The Guardian
Politician of the Year	Alan Johnson
Writer of the Year	Val McDermid
Sports Personality of the Year	Nigel Owens
Bigot of the Year	Anthony Priddis
Journalist of the Year	Philip Hensher
Broadcast of the Year	Hollyoaks
Stonewall & Barclays Community Group of the Year	London Lesbian and Gay Switchboard
Entertainer of the Year	Dan Gillespie Sells
Hero of the Year	Antony Grey

== 2008 ==
Stonewall nominated Julie Bindel for the 2008 Journalist of the Year award. This nomination was controversial due to her view on transsexualism and lead to a protest taking place outside of the awards venue.

Award	Winner(s)
Publication of the Year	Time Out
Politician of the Year	Waheed Alli
Stonewall Sports Award	Stonewall Lions FC
Writer of the Year	Stella Duffy
Bigot of the Year	Iris Robinson
Community Group of the Year	UK Lesbian & Gay Immigration Group
Journalist of the Year	Miriam Stoppard
Broadcaster of the Year	Sandi Toksvig
Hero of the Year	Gene Robinson

== 2009 ==
Award	Winner(s)
Publication of the Year	g3
Politician of the Year	Ben Bradshaw
Stonewall Sports Award	Michael Hill
Writer of the Year	Sarah Waters
Bigot of the Year	Jointly Jan Moir and Father John Owen
Journalist of the Year	Jointly Johann Hari and Joan Bakewell
Entertainer of the Year	Boyzone
Broadcaster of the Year	Samira Ahmed
Hero of the Year	Rev Scott Rennie

== 2010 ==
Award	Winner(s)
Publication of the Year	The Times
Politician of the Year	John Bercow
Stonewall Sports Award	Martina Navratilova
Writer of the Year	Jointly Stella Duffy and Rupert Smith
Bigot of the Year	Chris Grayling
Journalist of the Year	Patrick Strudwick
Entertainer of the Year	John Partridge
Stonewall Community Group of the Year	MindOut
Broadcaster of the Year	Coronation Street
Hero of the Year	Gareth Thomas

== 2011 ==
Held on 3 November 2011.

Award	Winner(s)
Publication of the Year	The Guardian Weekend
Politician of the Year	Chris Bryant
Stonewall Sports Award	Anton Hysen
Writer of the Year	Alan Hollinghurst
Bigot of the Year	Melanie Phillips
Journalist of the Year	Jointly Vanessa Feltz and Matthew Todd
Entertainer of the Year	Jane Hazlegrove in Casualty
Stonewall Community Group of the Year	UK Black Pride
Broadcaster of the Year	The World's Worst Place to be Gay? Scott Mills/BBC Three
Hero of the Year	Roger Crouch

== 2012 ==
The 2012 awards were held on 1 November, with the award of "Bigot of the Year" to Cardinal Keith O'Brien drawing protest from the Catholic Church in Scotland, of which he was head. Criticism of the bigot award from the winner of the Politician of the Year award, Ruth Davidson, lead to her being "booed off-stage".

Award	Winner(s)
Publication of the Year	Gay Star News
Politician of the Year	Ruth Davidson
Stonewall Sports Award	Rugby Football League
Writer of the Year	Jeanette Winterson
Bigot of the Year	Keith O'Brien
Journalist of the Year	Hugo Rifkind and Owen Jones
Entertainer of the Year	Sue Perkins
Stonewall Community Group of the Year	East London Out Project
Broadcast of the Year	Britain's Got Talent
Hero of the Year	Giles Fraser

== 2013 ==
Award	Winner(s)
Publication of the Year	Metro
Politician of the Year	Baroness Stowell of Beeston
Stonewall Sports Award	Cardiff Lions
Writer of the Year	Damian Barr
Bigot of the Year	Pat Robertson
Entertainer of the Year	Antony Cotton
Journalist of the Year	Grace Dent
Broadcast of the Year	CBBC's Marrying Mum And Dad
Hero of the Year	Lord Alli and the Russia LGBT Network (joint award)
Advert Of The Year	Mamas And Papas
Stonewall Community Group of the Year	Quaker Lesbian & Gay Fellowship

== 2014 ==
Award	Winner(s)
Publication of the Year	i
Politician of the Year	Lord Cashman and Lynne Featherstone MP
Stonewall Sports Award	Pride House
Writer of the Year	Sarah Waters
Entertainer of the Year	Alicya Eyo (Emmerdale)
Journalist of the Year	Liz MacKean
Broadcast of the Year	Pride
Hero of the Year	Pepe Julian Onziema
Advert of the Year	London Pride and Barclays (#FreedomTo)
Stonewall Community Group of the Year	OLGA (Older Lesbian, Gay, Bisexual and Trans Association)

== 2015 ==
Award	Winner(s)
Publication of the Decade	The Guardian
Politician of the Decade	Waheed Alli
Sports Person or Team of the Decade	Nigel Owens
Writer of the Decade	Sarah Waters
Entertainer of the Decade	Dan Gillespie Sells
Journalist of the Decade	Liz MacKean
Broadcast of the Decade	Hollyoaks
Trans Media Award	Boy Meets Girl
