= Debbie Hayton =

Transgender British teacher and political activist

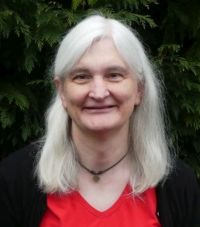
- Debbie Hayton in 2021
- Born: 1968 (age 57–58)
- Occupation: Teacher
- Years active: 2016–present
- Known for: Opposition to gender self-identification for transgender people
- Website: debbiehayton.com

Debbie Hayton (born 1968) is a British secondary school science teacher and political activist.

== Activism ==
Since 2016, she has been a vocal opponent of gender self-identification, and supports laws which aim to define women-only spaces as being based on sex rather than gender identity. She has spoken at meetings for Woman's Place UK, a gender-critical group.

At a July 2019 event hosted by Fair Play For Women, Hayton wore a T-shirt which (mimicking a slogan by Stonewall) stated that "Trans women are men. Get over it." She was criticised and threatened with expulsion from the LGBT+ committee of the Trades Union Congress for her actions. Hayton had sat on the committee for five years.

In 2020, the National Education Union's Trans and non-binary network criticised Hayton's appointment by the union for a role on the TUC's LGBT+ Committee.

Hayton's inclusion in Church of England resource materials caused controversy at General Synod in 2021. Jayne Ozanne criticised the inclusion, describing Hayton as someone "outspoken in her denial of the very existence of trans people". Synod member Ian Paul supported Hayton, asking Bishop Sarah Mullally about actions being taken to protect Hayton "from intimidation and from attempts to silence her". Hayton is also often criticized by other gender critical feminists such as Julia Long on account of Hayton's transsexual identity.

In 2025, Hayton argued that she had come to disagree with the gender-critical view that only sex can define the words "man" and "woman", as "the perception of sex, which is just as much a product of our biology, also matters — and in many situations, it matters more."

== Personal life ==
Hayton is a transsexual woman, who underwent gender transition in 2012 and gender reassignment surgery in 2016. She is married with three children.
