= Elizabeth A. Wilson =

Feminist science academic

Elizabeth Ann Wilson

Academic background
- Education: University of Otago, University of Sydney

Academic work
- Discipline: Women’s, Gender, and Sexuality Studies
- Institutions: University of Western Sydney, Australian National University, University of Sydney, Emory University

Elizabeth A. Wilson is a Samuel Candler Dobbs professor of women’s, gender, and sexuality studies at Emory University. She is a scholar of feminist science studies, and her work brings together psychoanalytic theory, affect theory, feminist and queer theory, and neurobiology. She is the author of Neural Geographies: Feminism and the Microstructure of Cognition (1998), Psychosomatic: Feminism and the Neurological Body (2004), Affect and Artificial Intelligence (2010), and Gut Feminism (2015).

== Education ==
Wilson graduated from University of Otago in New Zealand with a B.Sc. in psychology. As an undergraduate, she majored in psychology in part because they did not have a women's studies department though she continued her support of feminist issues outside of the classroom. She graduated from the University of Sydney with a Ph.D. in psychology.

== Career ==
Wilson is a Samuel Candler Dobbs professor of women’s, gender, and sexuality studies at Emory University. She joined Emory University in 2009. Prior to her appointment at Emory University, she was an Australian Research Council Fellow at the University of New South Wales. The Australian Research Council funded a project titled "The Embodiment of Melancholy: A Feminist Analysis of Depression" that investigated a multidisciplinary approach to understanding depression.

She has held positions at the University of Western Sydney, the Australian National University, and the University of Sydney. She was a member of the School of Social Science at the Institute for Advanced Study in Princeton, New Jersey, and she was a Helen Putnam Fellow at the Radcliffe Institute for Advanced Study at Harvard University. While a fellow at the Radcliffe Institute, she completed research for her book Gut Feminism.

She is the author of Neural Geographies: Feminism and the Microstructure of Cognition (1998), Psychosomatic: Feminism and the Neurological Body (2004), Affect and Artificial Intelligence (2010), and Gut Feminism (2015). Neural Geographies encourages feminist psychologists to think the biological body, and in Psychosomatic she continues this theme of exploring the relationship between biology and psychology. In Affect and Artificial Intelligence, she provides perspectives on artificial intelligence research, the relationship of humans and technology, and the psychosocial contexts of computers. Her most recent book, Gut Feminism, focuses on depression and explores how antidepressant pharmaceutical data can be useful to feminists. Her research adds to the work of feminist science scholars more broadly in rethinking the relationship between nature and culture.

== Works ==
- Neural Geographies: Feminism and the Microstructure of Cognition. Routledge. 1998. ISBN 978-0415916004.
- Psychosomatic: Feminism and the Neurological Body. Duke University Press. 2004. ISBN 978-0-8223-3365-4.
- Affect and Artificial Intelligence. University of Washington Press. 2011. ISBN 978-0-295-80000-4.
- Gut Feminism. Duke University Press. 2015. ISBN 978-0-8223-7520-3.
