= Stonewall (charity) =

UK-based charity and advocacy group for LGBTQ+ rights

Stonewall Equality Limited
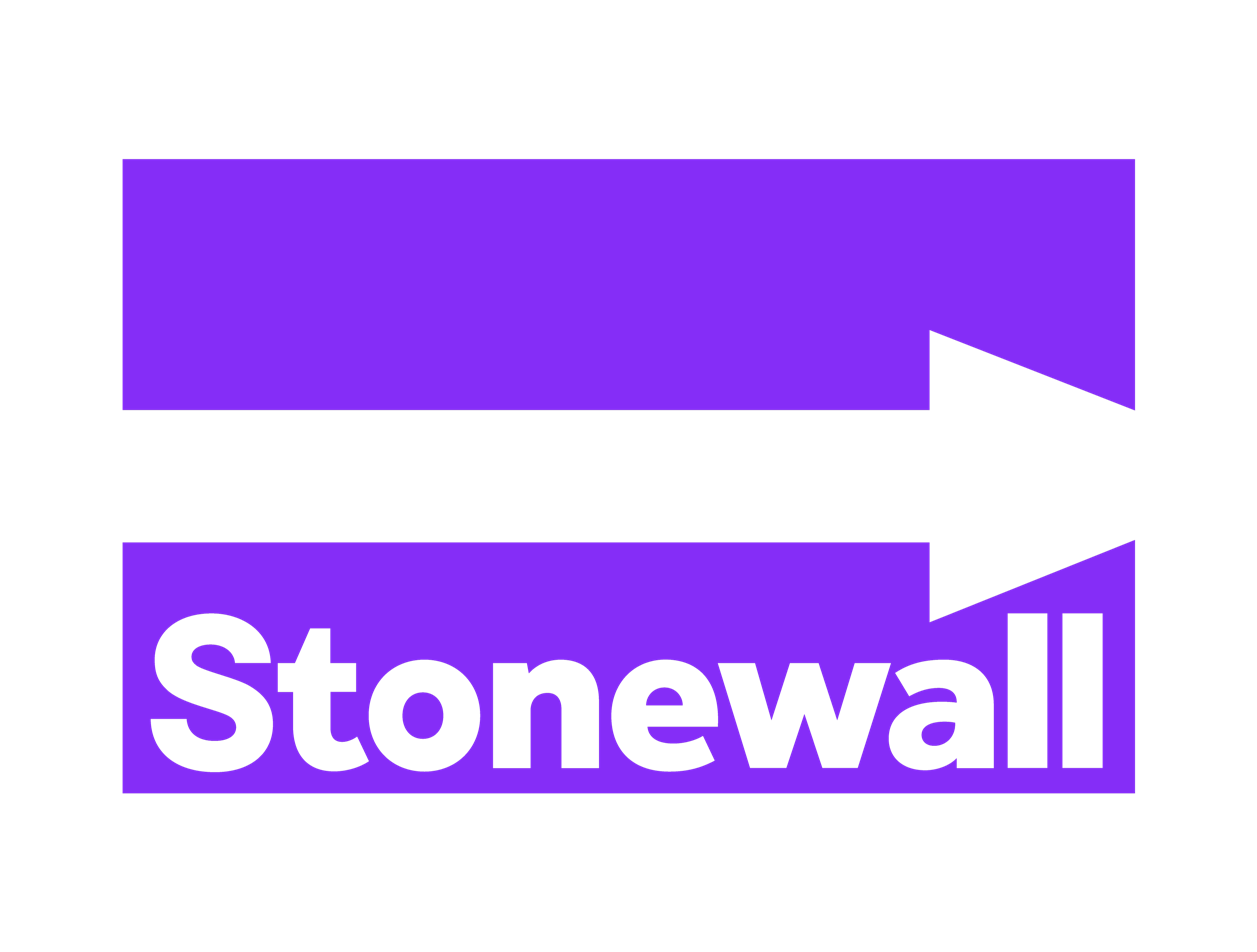
- Stonewall Logo
- Formation: 24 May 1989; 37 years ago
- Type: Charity
- Purpose: LGBTQ+, Human Rights, Campaigning
- Headquarters: London Borough of Islington
- Region served: United Kingdom
- Chair: Kezia Dugdale
- Main organ: Board of Trustees
- Revenue: £4.7 million
- Staff: 130
- Website: stonewall.org.uk
- Formerly called: The Stonewall Lobby Group Limited (1989–2004)

Stonewall Equality Limited, trading as Stonewall, is a lesbian, gay, bisexual, transgender and queer (LGBTQ) rights charity in the United Kingdom. It is the largest LGBTQ rights organisation in Europe.

Named after the 1969 Stonewall riots in New York City, Stonewall was formed in 1989 by political activists and others campaigning against Section 28 of the Local Government Act 1988, including Ian McKellen, Lisa Power, and Michael Cashman. Stonewall diversified into policy development after Labour came to power in 1997, a period which saw successful campaigns to repeal Section 28, end the ban on LGBT people in the armed forces, equalise the age of consent, extend adoption and IVF rights to same-sex couples, and introduce civil partnerships.

== History ==
Stonewall was formed on 24 May 1989, in response to Section 28 of the Local Government Act. The organisation was founded by Peter Ashman, Deborah Ballard, Duncan Campbell, Olivette Cole-Wilson, Michael Cashman, Pam St Clement, Simon Fanshawe, Dorian Jabri, Ian McKellen, Matthew Parris, Lisa Power, Fiona Cunningham Reid, Peter Rivas, and Jennifer (Jennie) Wilson.

Originally named The Stonewall Lobby Group Ltd, the organisation changed its name to Stonewall Equality Ltd on 16 March 2004.

=== Repeal of LGBT military ban (2000) ===
One of Stonewall's first and longest campaigns challenged the ban on lesbians and gay men serving in the armed forces. The campaign began when Robert Ely, who had served in the British Army for 17 years, and former Army Nurse Elaine Chambers approached Stonewall. The discovery of a letter had led to Ely's sexual orientation being disclosed and he was subjected to an investigation and discharged from the army. In 1998, Stonewall was approached by Jeanette Smith, who had been discharged from the Royal Air Force, and Duncan Lustig Prean, a Royal Navy commander who was being so discharged from the Navy. They asked Stonewall to arrange legal representation, leading to a long battle through the courts with Graham Grady and John Beckett also joining the case.

The case pre-dated the Human Rights Act 1998. Although the judges in the High Court and Court of Appeal said that they felt the ban was not justified, they could not overturn it and the individuals had to take the case to the European Court of Human Rights where they were successful. The judgment of the court was a vindication of the rights of lesbians and gay men and the New Labour government of the time immediately announced that the ban would be lifted. This took effect on 12 January 2000, and a new general code of sexual conduct was introduced. While the internal policy had changed in 2000, the law banning homosexuality in the armed forces was not officially repealed until the 2016 Armed Forces Act.

In February 2005, the Royal Navy joined Stonewall's Diversity Champions programme, the Royal Air Force and the British Army, the largest of the three services in June 2008. The number of major employers involved in the programme grew from 100 members in 2005 to over 600 in 2010. Organisations now engaged in the programme, between them employing over four million people include many UK universities health trusts banks and financial institutions.

=== Diversity Champions programme (2001-2025) ===
In 2001, Stonewall launched its Diversity Champions programme, a programme which worked with over 900 organisations to ensure that lesbian, gay, bisexual, transgender and queer people (the LGBTQ+ community) were comfortable in the workplace. This included addressing outright discrimination, as well as "more discrete" forms of heterosexist thinking.

Employers who paid to join the scheme were given a logo to use on promotional materials and were listed on a 'Proud Employers' careers site. They gained access to a library of resources and could have their policies reviewed for LGBT inclusivity by Stonewall staff. Members of the scheme were given advice on words and phrases used in their staff support materials, including a preference for gender-neutral language.

=== 2000 - 2010 ===
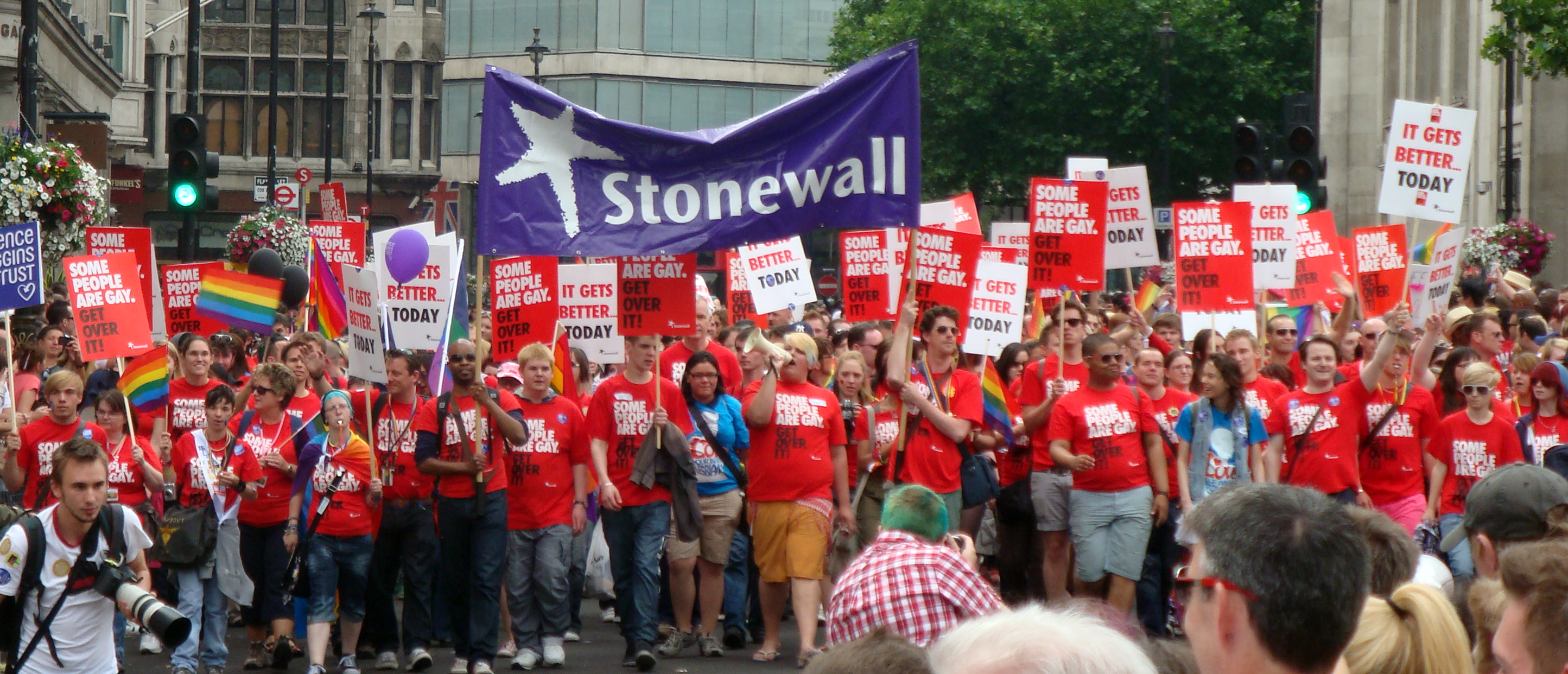
Stonewall at London Pride 2011.

Under Angela Mason, Stonewall became the most influential LGBTQ+ lobbying organisation in Britain. Mason's tenure saw Stonewall support legal test cases in the European Court of Human Rights which included:

- Chris Morris and Euan Sutherland, who in Sutherland v United Kingdom successfully challenged the unequal age of consent laws.
- Duncan Lustig-Prean and John Beckett, who successfully challenged the ban on gay people in the armed forces.
- Lisa Grant, who (unsuccessfully) sued her employer, South West Trains, for equal pay and benefits.

Legislative achievements in this period or arising from Mason's work include:

- amendments to the 2002 Adoption and Children Bill, which treated lesbian, gay and bisexual couples in the same way as heterosexuals
- equalisation of the age of consent to 16 years old, as part of the Sexual Offences (Amendment) Act 2000, after the use of the Parliament Acts 1911 and 1949, in November 2000
- repeal of Clause 2a of the Local Government Act in Scotland (2000).
- repeal Section 28 of the Local Government Act in England and Wales (2003)
- recognition of anti-LGBTQ+ hate crimes through the Criminal Justice Act 2003
- introduction of the Civil Partnership Act 2004, which gave same-sex couples a legal framework equivalent to civil marriage.

Away from the courts and Parliament, Stonewall launched the Diversity Champions programme in 2001. The scheme engaged employers in developing best practice and within 18 months successfully garnered members ranging from major banks, through national retailers to Government departments such as the MoD, Home Office and the Treasury. Stonewall gained Lottery funding for the Citizen 21 programme, a three-year project (2000 to 2003) which tackled LGB discrimination in education and developed materials that became widely used in the education sector. An information bank and advice service was also formed as part of the project.

Stonewall was also involved in successful parliamentary campaigns to:

- shape the Equality Act (Sexual Orientation) Regulations, protections against discrimination on grounds of sexual orientation in the provision of goods and services secured through the Equality Act 2006.
- equalise treatment of lesbian parents and their children in the Human Fertilisation and Embryology Act 2008
- introduce an offence of incitement to homophobic hatred in the Criminal Justice and Immigration Act 2008, matching existing protections around race and religion.

=== Same-sex marriage (2010) ===
Stonewall under the leadership of Ben Summerskill came under criticism in September 2010, after he made comments at a Liberal Democrat party conference fringe event that Stonewall "expressed and expresses no view" on same-sex marriage and that the equal marriage policy proposed by gay Liberal Democrat MP Stephen Williams could potentially cost £5 billion. Summerskill's comments were criticised by two of Stonewall's co-founders: Michael Cashman MEP wrote an op-ed for PinkNews entitled "What part of 'equality' can't Stonewall understand?"; and Sir Ian McKellen stated that Stonewall should put marriage equality on their agenda. Summerskill defended his comments at the Labour Party conference a week later after LGBTQ+ Labour activists criticised Stonewall's lack of transparency and democracy, and failure to lobby for marriage; he stated that "Stonewall has never pretended to be a democratic member organisation. We have never said we speak for all lesbian, gay and bisexual people." In the face of pressure from the LGBT community, including a PinkNews survey finding that 98% of the LGBTQ+ community wanted the right to marry, Stonewall announced in October 2010 their support for same-sex marriage.

In October 2010, Stonewall revised its policy and agreed to support same-sex marriage, stating "Stonewall is pleased to be widening its campaigning objectives to include extending the legal form of marriage to gay people".

PinkNews reported heavily on the refusal of Stonewall, an LGBTQ+ rights group, to actively campaign for gay marriage prior to October 2010. Stonewall's then Chief Executive Ben Summerskill suggested "it would cost a staggering £5 billion to implement", a figure later seized upon by opponents of same-sex marriage despite its lack of factual basis. The rift came to a head at Liberal Democrats conference in 2010, where Summerskill argued that "there are lots of lesbians who actually don't want marriage". The event was attended by Lynne Featherstone, the minister for equality; Evan Harris, president of Liberal Democrat LGBT+ group DELGA; and Steve Gilbert, the Lib Dem MP, all of whom said they supported same-sex marriage. A poll commissioned by PinkNews and answered by more than 800 of their readership found 98% in support of marriage equality, with many comments calling for Summerskill's resignation. Stonewall was also criticised by a former founder, Michael Cashman, MEP, over its policy.

Stonewall's former position on same-sex marriage came under greater scrutiny in March 2014, two weeks before the first same-sex marriages were to commence; in a BBC Radio 4 programme on same-sex marriage, Summerskill attacked the Liberal Democrats for being "cynical and opportunistic" during their Autumn 2010 conference, highlighting Evan Harris's comment that the policy would put "clear blue water between [them] and the Tories", a position that was criticised by Lynne Featherstone, the Liberal Democrat junior minister responsible for the act, and Peter Tatchell.

=== In the 2010s ===
Stonewall's work focused on working with organisations to bring equality to gay, lesbian, bisexual and transgender people at home, at school, and at work. Stonewall's Diversity Champions programme for major employers rose from 100 members to over 650. Organisations engaged in the programme, between them employing over four million people, ranged from Deloitte and American Express in the private sector to the Royal Navy, Royal Air Force, British Army and MI5 in the public sector.

In 2005 Stonewall launched an Education for All programme, supported by a coalition of over 70 organisations, to tackle homophobia in schools. Stonewall's education work also includes the slogan 'Some people are gay. Get over it!' which has been seen at schools, on billboards, tube carriages and buses across Britain.

Stonewall has also produced research reports in areas such as homophobic hate crime, lesbian health and homophobia in football.

Stonewall also holds a number of high-profile events, including the Stonewall Equality Dinner, the Stonewall Summer Party and the Brighton Equality Walk.

On the second annual International Asexuality Day, it was announced that Stonewall is launching the UK's first asexual rights initiative in partnership with asexual model and activist Yasmin Benoit. The Guardian noted that Stonewall's chief executive, Ruth Hunt, has "been criticised for being too timid – for example for not joining a boycott [in May 2014] of the Dorchester hotel, owned by the Sultan of Brunei, who gave approval to Brunei's new penal code, which urges death by stoning for same-sex sexual activity". The charity had attracted much attention when it announced in The Daily Telegraph that Stonewall would not be joining the wide boycott of the London hotel where it was to hold a gala dinner. The CEO, Ruth Hunt, argued that there was not "a mandate for the boycott" and "We only implement actions that we can calculate will have an impact."

Days before the May 2015 UK general election Stonewall apologised after being criticised for publishing an online campaign graphic which suggested that only the Labour Party substantially supported LGBTQ+ equality in its manifesto. Lib Dem Minister Stephen Williams had previously told PinkNews: "I'm astounded by this grossly misleading graphic."

=== Safe Schools Alliance (2020) ===
In 2020, lawyers for a 14-year-old girl and the Safe Schools Alliance made an application for judicial review against the Crown Prosecution Service in respect of its hate crime guidance for schools and its association with the Diversity Champions programme, saying that it was biased in favour of transgender individuals. This was dismissed by the High Court in 2021, with Mr Justice Cavanagh saying: "There is no basis for asserting that the individual prosecutor will be influenced in any way by the CPS' status as a Diversity Champion."

=== Withdrawals from the Diversity Champions scheme ===
In May 2021, the Equality and Human Rights Commission (EHRC) announced that it would be withdrawing from the Diversity Champions programme on the grounds that it did not constitute the best value for money. Liz Truss, the Minister for Women and Equalities, suggested that all government departments should withdraw from the scheme. Commentators in the UK press described the controversy as 'toxic', with each side taking increasingly extreme positions.

A University of Essex internal report released in May 2021 following the cancellation of two visiting speakers' invitations stated that the Equality Act 2010 only protects individuals who have undergone or intend to undergo gender reassignment, and not gender identity. Some critics of Stonewall stated that this made the organisation's advice under the Diversity Champions scheme potentially misleading. In response, Stonewall argued that the advice was based on the EHRC Code of Practice, which had been upheld by a court decision earlier that month.

In October 2021 the BBC aired Nolan Investigates, a podcast series presented by Stephen Nolan, looking at Stonewall's influence on public institutions across the UK. The series was viewed by some as an attack by the BBC on Stonewall and by others as an attack on the BBC and the extent to which the corporation itself is influenced by Stonewall.

In November 2021, the BBC withdrew from the scheme. Its Director General Tim Davie said it left for reasons of impartiality and to "minimise the risk of perceived bias". Stonewall responded that the exit was a result of "organised attacks on workplace inclusion that extend far beyond" the Diversity Champions scheme. By 2021, several organisations like Channel 4, the Ministry of Justice, the Department of Health, Ofcom and the Cabinet Office also withdrew from the Diversity Champion scheme.

In December 2021, University College London decided to withdraw from Stonewall programmes, saying its membership of Stonewall's programmes could inhibit academic freedom and discussion around sex and gender. Several Scottish universities declined to apply for a ranking in Stonewall's equality league table for 2022.

In July 2022 it was reported that the Department for Education had dissociated itself from Stonewall, and that Oxford University had been ordered by the Information Commissioner's Office to reveal the scores and feedback it received from Stonewall as part of its workplace scheme, because there was "an unusually strong public interest".

In March 2023, health secretary Steve Barclay wrote to ten health organisations asking them to reconsider their membership of the Diversity Champions scheme, because he wanted them to decide whether to follow the Department of Health and end their memberships.

In March 2024, a spokesperson for the Scottish Parliament said its membership of Stonewall's Diversity Champions scheme expired in February 2024 and would not be renewed.

In January 2025, it was reported that every major UK government department had left Stonewall's Diversity Champions scheme. According to The Times, this was because of "concerns about the level of influence the lobby group had on shaping Whitehall's internal policies."

=== Reduction in workforce (2025) ===
In February 2025, following the decision by US President Donald Trump to cut foreign aid, Stonewall's chief executive Simon Blake told staff of planned redundancies for "up to half" of its workforce.

The organisation also reported financial pressures during the mid-2020s and undertook restructuring measures, including proposed workforce reductions in 2025.

In July 2025, Stonewall launched a new, three-year strategy focusing on public policy engagement, legal protections, and workplace inclusion. As part of this change, the Diversity Champions programme was replaced with a revised workplace inclusion programme, Proud Employers. In 2025, chief executive Simon Blake pledged to fight for a ban on conversion practices that includes "every member of the lesbian, gay, bi and trans community".

In 2026, the organisation relaunched its Rainbow Laces campaign with a revised focus on grassroots and community sport, alongside the introduction of a "Proud Pledge" initiative aimed at promoting inclusive environments in sports and fitness settings.

== Chief Executives ==
Stonewall has been led by a series of chief executives since its founding. Tim Barnett was the organisation's first chief executive from 1989 to 1992, followed by Angela Mason from 1992 to 2002. Ben Summerskill held the role from 2003 to 2014, and was succeeded by Ruth Hunt, from 2014 to 2019. Nancy Kelley was chief executive from 2020 to 2023, followed by Ben Whur, from October 2023 to September 2024. Simon Blake assumed the position in September 2024. Blake had previously been chief executive of Mental Health First Aid England and had been involved with Stonewall as a trustee. Blake's leadership has taken place during a period in which Stonewall's role in workplace inclusion programmes and public policy has been the subject of public debate.

Governance of the organisation is overseen by a board of trustees. From 2022 to October 2023, the chair of the board was Iain Anderson.

In October 2023, Catherine Dixon succeeded Anderson as chair of the trustees.

== Transgender issues ==
=== Award nomination protests ===
In 2008, transgender rights activists picketed the Stonewall Awards in protest of the nomination of The Guardian contributor Julie Bindel for Journalist of the Year, who had written a piece in 2004 entitled "Gender Benders Beware" asserting that sex reassignment surgery was "unnecessary mutilation". Sue Perkins, winner of Entertainer of the Year, said she supported the decision to picket the event and that she was "incredibly upset that anyone has been offended". Comedian Amy Lame, nominee for Entertainer of the Year, considered the protest "insulting to Stonewall", which had "achieved so much for so many people – gay, lesbian, bisexual, transgender", saying "all of those people have been included in laws they helped to change."

In 2010, The Sun journalist Bill Leckie was nominated for the same award for his column on gay rugby player Gareth Thomas, in spite of being criticised in a Stonewall Scotland report in 2007 for his comments regarding a drag queen bingo night. Several trans rights campaigners made a direct comparison between the Leckie and Bindel nominations. A similar demonstration was planned for the awards ceremony, but was cancelled after Stonewall withdrew the nomination. Writing in The Guardian, Natacha Kennedy argued Stonewall was "holding back transgender equality", highlighting the nomination and claiming that trans people are unable to join the organisation despite having been "central to the 1969 Stonewall riots", as well as criticising the use of the pejorative term "tranny" in Stonewall's anti-homophobia film Fit, aimed at secondary schools.

=== Post-2015 ===
In 2015, Stonewall created an advisory group to help guide its work on transgender issues, and announced plans to start campaigning for trans equality in a report generated from consultation with over 700 trans people. Stonewall chief Ruth Hunt said that the organisation "recognise[d] the impact of mistakes we have made in the past" and "apologise[d] to trans people for the harm that we have caused", listing the award nominations, use of the word "tranny", and a failure to use their "positions of privilege" to discuss trans issues with ministers as "a series of cockups". In 2017, the group produced a document outlining their plan for Transgender Equality in the UK titled "A Vision for Change". In 2018, they released T-shirts with slogans opposing transphobia, such as "Trans Women Are Women. Get Over It!", based on the organisation's "Some People are Gay. Get Over it!" campaign from 2007.

In February 2019, Ruth Hunt stepped down amid controversy over the organisation's support for transgender rights. She said that Stonewall had a "moral responsibility" to defend trans rights. She said that during her tenure at the charity staff had doubled, and income had risen from £5.4m to £8.7m.

In June 2020, Hunt was succeeded by Nancy Kelley. In her first interview as incoming chief executive of Stonewall, Kelley argued that the organisation did not need to convince people to agree on a shared understanding of gender, and would instead focus on building support for "changes that make trans lives easier", such as "lower levels of hate crime, better access to health services and more inclusive schools and workplaces".

In October 2021, Kelley was quoted in the BBC News article "We're being pressured into sex by some trans women". She said: "Nobody should ever be pressured into dating, or pressured into dating people they aren't attracted to. But if you find that when dating, you are writing off entire groups of people, like people of colour, fat people, disabled people or trans people, then it's worth considering how societal prejudices may have shaped your attractions."

In November 2021, Kelley spoke alongside gender critical barrister Naomi Cunningham and evangelical Christian campaigner Jayne Ozanne in a discussion on "Banning Conversion Practices: The Path to Good Law" during an event organised by the Middle Temple LGBTQ+ Forum. Maya Forstater described the event as "historic" because it is the first time that Stonewall has debated with those who oppose its position that "trans women are women". Interviewed that month on Woman's Hour on BBC Radio 4, Kelley said "it's absolutely possible for people to hold gender critical beliefs without expressing them in a way that's harmful to trans people".

Writing in praise of Stonewall in The Spectator, James Kirkup, director of the Social Market Foundation, described Kelley's appearance at the Middle Temple event and her live interview with Emma Barnett on Woman's Hour as signals of a decision by Stonewall to engage in conversation, and that both are "laudable things to do and entail no small courage". Still, he criticised Stonewall for persisting with the idea that "sexual attraction based on anatomy is prejudice".

In July 2023, Kelley stepped down from her role as chief executive. Subsequently, the chair of trustees, Iain Anderson, called on all participants in the debate on transgender rights to "lower the temperature".

=== Opposition ===
In October 2018, critics urged Stonewall to acknowledge that "a conflict exists between transgenderism and sex-based women's rights". In response, CEO Ruth Hunt wrote: "We do not and will not acknowledge this. Doing so would imply that we do not believe that trans people deserve the same rights as others."

In 2018, the feminist campaign group For Women Scotland formed because of the perception that an expansion in trans rights sought by Stonewall would affect single-sex spaces.

In October 2019, the lobby group LGB Alliance formed in opposition to Stonewall's policies on transgender issues. Lesbian barrister Allison Bailey, who helped establish the organisation, initiated legal action against Stonewall in July 2020, claiming she had been victimised as a result. She lost all her claims against Stonewall, but the tribunal found that her Barristers' chambers had victimised her because of her tweet about the idea of a "cotton ceiling" and her belief that Stonewall had a dangerous agenda regarding gender self-identification.

In July 2022, NHS England responded to the Cass Review by deciding to close the NHS Gender Identity Development Service. Instead, it will create two new centres in London and Manchester. Stonewall praised the decision as an action to reduce unacceptable waiting times. The Economist described Stonewall's response as putting "a very brave face on it".

Also in July 2022, Stonewall received backlash and criticism for claiming that 2-year-olds could identify as transgender. The charity later published a clarification, saying that the original statement "was unclear".

Writing in The Times, Stonewall co-founder and former Conservative MP Matthew Parris criticised the charity for getting "tangled up in the trans issue" and being "cornered into an extreme stance". Kelley responded that support for transgender rights was the norm for LGBTQ+ organisations and that she was "really comfortable" with Stonewall's direction as an organisation.

Stonewall's policy on self-identification has been criticised by founding members such as Simon Fanshawe, and actor and gay rights activist Simon Callow.

In November 2023, Minister for Women and Equalities Kemi Badenoch attacked Stonewall as having been taken over by "leftist" thinking. She said: "It's not the same Stonewall of 20 or 30 years ago, which started advising government and saying: 'Well, this is what you need to do in order to serve a particular community.' And then it overreached and started giving people legal advice or advice that is certainly different from what the Equality Act says." Stonewall defended its work, saying it provides expert guidance to employers to support LGBTQ+ people at work, and does not offer legal advice.

=== Public debate ===
In the late 2010s and early 2020s, Stonewall's advocacy on transgender rights became the subject of public and political debate in the United Kingdom. Critics, including some commentators, politicians, and former supporters, argued that the organisation had adopted an increasingly assertive position on gender identity issues, raising concerns about its interpretation of equality law and its influence on public institutions. Stonewall and its supporters stated that its work reflects evolving understandings of LGBTQ+ rights and aims to promote equality and inclusion for transgender people.

== See also ==
- LGBTQ rights in the United Kingdom
- List of LGBTQ rights organisations
- Sexual orientation and military service
- Stonewall riots
- Stonewall Awards
