= Audio and Radio Industry Awards =

British radio and audio awards created 2016

- (The ARIAs)
- Awarded for: Excellence in radio / audio presenting and production
- Date: 2 May 2023
- Location: Theatre Royal, Drury Lane, London
- Country: United Kingdom
- Presented by: The Radio Academy
- Hosted by: Rylan Clark
- Formerly called: The Sony Radio Awards; The Radio Academy Awards
- First award: 2016; 10 years ago
- Website: www.radioacademy.org
- Related: The Radio Academy Awards; The Young Audio Awards

The Audio and Radio Industry Awards (ARIAS, ARIAs, or UK ARIAs) are annual awards awarded for excellence in UK radio and audio presenting and production. Established in 2016 by the Radio Academy, they succeeded the Radio Academy Awards, the academy's honours system of 1983 to 2014 (there were no awards for 2015). They are awarded for productions in the previous calendar year. In contrast to many other media award ceremonies, three winners are selected by judging panels for each category and graded Gold, Silver or Bronze.

In May 2019 the Young ARIAs were inaugurated at the BBC Radio Theatre in London in a ceremony hosted by BBC Radio 1's Matt Edmondson and Kiss FM host Daisy Maskell. The very next year they were rebranded as the Young Audio Awards.

== Notable omissions ==
Since their launch, the Audio and Radio Industry Awards have been shunned by the biggest commercial radio group in the UK, Global Radio. Although the Radio Academy is not supported by Global Radio this does not preclude it from entering programmes or presenters from its stations, namely Heart, Capital, LBC, Capital Xtra, Classic FM, Smooth Radio, Radio X or Gold.

== ARIAs 2016 ==
Nominations for the 16 inaugural award categories were unveiled on 19 September 2016 by Radio 1's Scott Mills and Pandora Christie of Kiss FM. The shortlist for each category was limited to five nominees.

Presented: 19 October 2016 at the First Direct Arena, Leeds – Host: Sara Cox
Best News Coverage	Best Entertainment Production	Best Audio Dramatisation
Gold: The Buncrana Pier Tragedy (BBC Radio Foyle); Silver: A New Life in Europe: The Dhnie Family (BBC Radio 4); Bronze: PM: Jo Cox's Murder (BBC Radio 4)	Gold: Greg James (BBC Radio 1); Silver: The Christian O'Connell Breakfast Show (Absolute Radio); Bronze: The Pin (BBC Radio 4)	Gold: lament (BBC Radio Drama London for BBC Radio 4); Silver: Cuttin’ It (BBC Radio Drama London for Radio 4); Bronze: Merseyside Blitz: An Unconquered People (BBC Radio Merseyside)
Best National Speech Breakfast Show	Best Local Breakfast Show	Best National Music Breakfast Show
Gold: Today (BBC Radio 4); Silver: 5 Live Breakfast (BBC Radio 5 Live); Bronze: Good Morning Scotland (BBC Radio Scotland)	Gold: Georgey at Breakfast (BBC Radio York); Silver: Sam and Amy (Gem); Bronze: Morgan in the Morning (BBC Radio Stoke)	Gold: The Chris Evans Breakfast Show (BBC Radio 2); Silver: The Christian O'Connell Breakfast Show (Absolute Radio); Bronze: Emily Segal (Heat Radio)
Best Sports Show	Best Digital Audio Service	Podcast of the Year
Gold: 606 (Shooting Shark Productions for BBC Radio 5 Live); Silver: Boro are Back! (BBC Radio Tees); Bronze: 5 Live Sport (BBC Radio 5 Live)	Gold: AudioBoom; Silver: Live @ Wimbledon Radio (IMG Radio on behalf of the All England Lawn Tennis Club); Bronze: Acast	Gold: The Story of Izzy Dix (Newsbeat for BBC Radio 1); Silver: The Modern Mann (Rethink Audio); Bronze: Storytime with Boon: "This is Distorted"
Best Digital Innovation	The Radio Academy Award	Speech Broadcaster of the Year
Gold: The BBC iPlayer Radio App; Silver: BBC Radio 2 Country; Bronze: Acast	Gold: Sound Digital for D2 (Note: D2 was the pre-licensing generic term for the creation of a second Digital Audio Broadcasting UK-wide multiplex); Silver: Bronze:	Gold: Stephen Nolan (BBC Radio Ulster and BBC Radio 5 Live); Silver: Kirsty Young – Desert Island Discs (BBC Radio 4); Bronze: Nihal (BBC Asian Network)
Music Broadcaster of the Year	Best Local Station	Best National Station
Gold: MistaJam (BBC Radio 1Xtra); Silver: Jamie Cullum – Folded Wing (BBC Radio 2); Bronze: Stephen McCauley (BBC Radio Foyle)	Gold: Hallam FM; Silver: Forth 1; Bronze: BBC Essex	Gold: BBC Radio 2; Silver: BBC Radio 1Xtra; Bronze: Absolute Radio
Audio Moment of the Year
Gold: The Boy Who Gave His Heart Away (TBI Media for BBC Radio 4); Silver: Where are you going New York? (Loftus Media for BBC World Service); Bronze: The Archers: Helen Stabs Rob (BBC Radio Drama Birmingham for BBC Radio 4)

== ARIAs 2017 ==
Nominations were revealed on 18 September 2017 by Virgin Radio presenters Kate Lawler and Matt Richardson. The number of categories was increased to 23, each with a shortlist of six nominees.

Presented: 19 October 2017 at the First Direct Arena, Leeds – Host: Scott Mills
Best New Presenter	Best New Show	Best News Coverage
Gold: Andrew Flintoff (BBC Radio 5 Live); Silver: Andrew Scott, U2@40 documentary (TBI Media / Absolute Radio); Bronze: Gemma Atkinson (Key 103)	Gold: Flintoff, Savage & the Ping Pong Guy (BBC Radio 5 Live); Silver: Quake (BBC Radio 4 / BBC Radio Production North); Bronze: Soundtracking with Edith Bowman (Ora et Labora / Edith Bowman)	Gold: London Bridge Attacks (Stephen Nolan for BBC Radio 5 Live); Silver: PM: The High Street Abduction (Andrew Bomford for BBC Radio 4); Bronze: BBC Radio Leeds
Best Speech Presenter – Breakfast	Best Speech Presenter – Non breakfast	Sports Show of the Year
Gold: Nicky Campbell and Rachel Burden (BBC Radio 5 Live); Silver: Vanessa Feltz (BBC Radio London); Bronze: Liz Green (BBC Radio Leeds)	Gold: Iain Lee (Talkradio); Silver: Jeremy Vine (BBC Radio 2); Bronze: Mike Sweeney (BBC Radio Manchester)	Gold: 5 Live Sport (BBC Radio 5 Live); Silver: Our summer: The Story of Wales at Euro 2016 (BBC Radio Wales); Bronze: On the Sporting Couch (talkSPORT)
Best Music Presenter – Breakfast	Best Music Presenter – Non breakfast	Best Specialist Music Show
Gold: Christian O'Connell (Absolute Radio); Silver: JACK’S Morning Glory (JACK FM); Bronze: Chris Evans (BBC Radio 2)	Gold: Annie Mac (BBC Radio 1); Silver: Richard Allinson (Magic Radio); Bronze: Stephen McCauley (BBC Radio Foyle & BBC Radio Ulster)	Gold: Benji B (TBI Media / BBC Radio 1 & BBC Radio 1Xtra); Silver: The Folk Show with Mark Radcliffe (7digital / BBC Radio 2); Bronze: Soundtracking with Edith Bowman (Ora et Labora / Edith Bowman)
Best Entertainment / Comedy Production	Best Factual Storytelling	Best Fictional Storytelling
Gold: The Frank Skinner Show (Avalon TV / Absolute Radio); Silver: A Normal Life – Henry Normal (BBC Studios Comedy); Bronze: 24-hour “LOLathon” for Red Nose Day – Scott Mills & Chris Stark (BBC Radio 1)	Gold: The Enemy Within (Falling Tree Productions / BBC Radio 3); Silver: Hillsborough: Trevor and Jenni's Journey (BBC Radio Merseyside for BBC Radio 5 Live); Bronze: The Tale of June and Gretel (BBC Radio Berkshire)	Gold: Life Lines (BBC Radio Drama); Silver: Sarah Kendall: Australian Trilogy (BBC Studios Comedy); Bronze: Comment is Free (BBC Radio 4 Bristol)
Best Community Programme	Best Online Radio Station	Best Podcast
Gold: The Manchester Bombing (Key 103); Silver: Dig Deep (JACK FM); Bronze: National Prison Radio (Prison Radio Association); Bronze: Talking Heads (BBC Radio Berkshire)	Gold: Worldwide FM; Silver: Live @ Wimbledon Radio (IMG Radio on behalf of the All England Lawn Tennis Club); Bronze: Reform	Gold: Flintoff, Savage and the Ping Pong Guy (BBC Radio 5 Live); Silver: Close Encounters (Rethink Audio / The Guardian); Bronze: The Untold: Missing (BBC Radio Documentaries)
Best On-Air Promotion	Best Branded Content or Partnership	Best Marketing Campaign
Gold: 6 Music Festival in Glasgow (BBC Radio 6 Music); Silver: UEFA Euro 2016 France (talkSPORT Creative); Bronze: The Archers (BBC Radio 4 presentation)	Gold: The Christian O'Connell Breakfast Show with Wickes (Absolute Radio); Silver: BBC Local Radio and National Poetry Day (BBC English Regions); Bronze: Mardi Gras 2017 with British Airways (Jazz FM); Bronze: School of Rock (Magic Radio)	Gold: BBC Radio 1Xtra Street Studio; Silver: See Radio Differently Campaign (Radiocentre); Bronze: Superhero Day (Bauer Media)
Best Coverage of an Event	Local Station of the Year	National Radio Station of the Year
Gold: Manchester's Response to the Arena Attack (Key 103); Silver: Running the Brighton Marathon (BBC Sussex); Bronze: BBC Radio 1's Big Weekend; Highly commended: World Cup ‘66 Live (TBI Media / BBC Radio 2)	Gold: BBC Radio London; Silver: BBC Radio Merseyside; Bronze: Metro Radio	Gold: BBC 1Xtra; Silver: Planet Rock; Bronze: BBC Radio 1
Team of the Year	Individual of the Year	
Winner: Local Radio Day (UKRD Group)	Winner: Tony Moorey, Group Content Director (Magic and Absolute Radio)	

== ARIAs 2018 ==
Nominations were revealed on 17 September 2018 by Capital South Wales presenters Matt Lissack and Polly James. New categories introduced this year included Best Local Radio Show, Funniest Show, Best Commercial Promotion and Best Station Sound.

Presented: 18 October 2018 at the First Direct Arena, Leeds – Hosts: Melvin Odoom and Pandora Christie of Kiss FM
Best New Presenter	Best New Show / Podcast	Best News Coverage
Gold: Ronan Keating (Magic); Silver: Mollie King (BBC Radio 1); Bronze: Kat Harbourne & Jenny Eells – The Naked Podcast (BBC Radio Sheffield)	Gold: You, Me & the Big C (BBC Radio 5 Live); Silver: Death in Ice Valley (BBC World Service); Bronze: I Hear Voices (BBC Newsbeat)	Gold: Real Life Stories, The Emma Barnett Show (BBC Radio 5 Live); Silver: BBC Radio Leeds; Bronze: We Stand Together: The Manchester Arena Attack One Year On (Tower FM)
Best Speech Presenter – Breakfast	Best Speech Presenter – Non breakfast	Best Sports Show / Podcast
Gold: Stephen Nolan (BBC Radio Ulster); Silver: Nicky Campbell & Rachel Burden (BBC Radio 5 Live); Bronze: Mishal Husain (BBC Radio 4)	Gold: Justin Dealey (BBC Eastern Counties); Silver: Tony Livesey (BBC Radio 5 Live); Bronze: Anna Foster (BBC Radio 5 Live)	Gold: Mo-Joe: An 18 Week Marathon Training Diary (7digital); Silver: Fight Disciples; Bronze: On The Left Side – The Funny Football Show
Best Music Presenter – Breakfast	Best Music Presenter – Non breakfast	Best Specialist Music Show
Gold: The Mylo & Rosie Show (Pulse 1); Silver: Nick Grimshaw: Radio 1 Breakfast; Bronze: Dotty: The 1Xtra Breakfast Show	Gold: Jamie Cullum (BBC Radio 2); Silver: Trevor Nelson (Somethin' Else for BBC Radio 2); Bronze: Edith Bowman – Soundtracking (Elbow Productions)	Gold: Soundtracking with Edith Bowman (Elbow Productions); Silver: Annie Mac (BBC Radio 1); Bronze: Soundscapes with Stephen McCauley (BBC Radio Ulster)
Funniest Show	Best Factual Storytelling / Documentary	Best Fictional Storytelling
Gold: Fortunately... with Fi and Jane (BBC Radio 4); Silver: International New Year Comedy Celebration (BBC World Service); Bronze: John Holmes Saturday Show (BBC Radio Kent)	Gold: Meeting The Man I Killed (Loftus Media for BBC Radio 4); Silver: Between the Ears: "The NHS Symphony" (BBC Radio Documentaries); Bronze: The Sound of Protest (Absolute Radio)	Gold: Carl Cattermole – Double Bubble (Prison Radio Association podcast); Silver: The World's Worst Children 3 by David Walliams (HarperCollins); Bronze: The Final Take: Bowie in the Studio for BBC World Service (Perfectly Normal Productions)
Best Community Programme	Best Podcast	Best Station Sound
Gold: The Frank Skinner Show conversation with Al Gore (Absolute Radio); Silver: The Helen & Douglas House Radiothon (JACK FM); Bronze: Mulberry Girls School, Tower Hamlets (BBC Asian Network)	Gold: Cariad Lloyd – Griefcast; Silver: Health Uncovered – This is Distorted with the NHS; Bronze: Double Bubble (PRA Productions)	Gold: Radio 1 Vintage (BBC Radio Pop Hub Station Sound); Silver: Absolute Radio; Bronze: Belfast is... (Q Radio)
Best Commercial Promotion	Best Marketing Campaign	Best Coverage of an Event
Gold: The Greatest Showman (Magic Radio); Silver: Just Eat – The 2018 FIFA World Cup, Russia (talkSport); Bronze: Wickes (Absolute Radio)	Gold: Common People (BBC Radio Sheffield); Silver: The 2018 FIFA World Cup, Russia (talkSport); Bronze: The Dave Berry Breakfast Show (Absolute Radio)	Gold: An Accent Exceedingly Rare: A Love Letter to Liverpool (BBC Radio Merseyside); Silver: Manchester – Together With One Voice (XS Manchester); Bronze: Gregathlon: Pedal To The Peaks (BBC Radio 1)
Best Local Radio Show	Local Station of the Year	National Station or Network of the Year
Gold: David Burns (BBC Radio Humberside); Silver: Wake Up with Webster (Tay FM); Bronze: Stephanie Hirst (BBC Radio Leeds)	Gold: BBC Radio Leeds; Silver: Forth 1; Bronze: BBC Radio Merseyside	Gold: BBC Radio 1; Silver: BBC Radio 5 Live; Bronze: Absolute Radio
Team of the Year	Individual of the Year	
Winner: Cash for Kids, Bauer Radio's network of local charities	Winner: Paul Sylvester, Content Director (Absolute Radio)	

== ARIAs 2019 ==
Fallow year (no awards ceremony was held in 2019).

== ARIAs 2020 ==
The awards ceremony was moved to a spring slot from its traditional autumn fixture and took place at The London Palladium. Nominations were revealed on 15 January 2020.

Presented: 4 March 2020 at The London Palladium – Host: Greg James
Best New Presenter	Best New Show	Best News Coverage
Gold: Raj & Pilar: The Reality Tea (Fresh Air Productions for BBC Radio 1); Silver: Jacob Hawley: On Drugs (BBC Sounds); Bronze: Tyler West (Kiss FM)	Gold: Radio 1 Breakfast with Greg James; Silver: The Next Episode (BBC News); Bronze: Politix & Chill (BBC Sussex)	Gold: Myles Bonnar: A-Game Exposé (BBC The Social and BBC News Scotland); Silver: Cops on the Front Line (BBC Radio Manchester); Bronze: PM: Anatomy of a Stabbing (BBC Radio 4)
Best Speech Presenter – Breakfast	Best Speech Presenter – Non breakfast	Best Sports Show
Gold: Toby Foster (BBC Radio Sheffield); Silver: Annabel Amos (BBC Radio Northampton); Bronze: 5 Live Breakfast (BBC Radio 5 live)	Gold: Emma Barnett (BBC Radio 5 Live); Silver: Mike Sweeney (BBC Radio Manchester); Bronze: Frank Skinner (Absolute Radio)	Gold: Super G: How Geraint won the Yellow Jersey (BBC Radio Wales); Silver: That Peter Crouch Podcast (BBC Radio 5 Live); Bronze: Tailenders (TBI Media for BBC Radio 5 Live)
Best Music Presenter – Breakfast	Best Music Presenter – Non breakfast	Best Specialist Music Show
Gold: Dotty: The 1Xtra Breakfast Show; Silver: Greg James: Radio 1 Breakfast; Bronze: Dave Berry: Absolute Radio	Gold: MistaJam (BBC Radio 1Xtra); Silver: Abbie McCarthy (BBC Radio Kent / BBC Radio 1 / BBC Radio 6 Music); Bronze: Edith Bowman – Soundtracking (Elbow Productions)	Gold: This Classical Life (BBC Radio 3); Silver: Absolute Radio Stories (Absolute Radio); Bronze: Gilles Peterson (Somethin' Else for BBC Radio 6 Music)
Funniest Show	Best Factual – Single programme	Best Factual – Series
Gold: Elis James and John Robins: Audio Always (BBC Radio 5 Live); Silver: James Veitch’s Contractual Obligation (BBC Radio 4); Bronze: Shagged Married Annoyed (Avalon)	Gold: Kane Walker: Life and Death On The Streets (BBC Radio WM); Silver: Being Gerry Adams (Juniper for BBC Radio 4); Bronze: A Sense of Quietness (Falling Tree Productions for BBC Radio 4)	Gold: Ladder to Nowhere (Whistledown Productions for BBC Radio 4); Silver: Surrogacy: A Family Frontier (BBC Radio 5 Live); Bronze: The Bellingcat Podcast: MH17 (Novel)
Best Community Programme	Best Independent Podcast	Best Station Sound
Gold: National Prison Radio (Prison Radio Association); Silver: Chris Evans with Reverend Ruth Scott (Virgin Radio); Bronze: Samaritans (talkSPORT)	Gold: Passenger List (Goldhawk Productions / Radiotopia); Silver: The Bellingcat Podcast: MH17 (Novel); Bronze: My Dad Wrote a Porno (Medium Maze)	Gold: Radio 1 Station Sound (BBC Popular Music Station Sound); Silver: Project Baxter on BBC Radio 6 Music (BBC Popular Music Station Sound); Bronze: Absolute Radio Network
Best Commercial Promotion	Best Marketing Campaign	Best Coverage of an Event
Gold: Samaritans (talkSPORT); Silver: Maldon Sea Salt: The Hometime Fish and Chip Tour 2019 (Absolute Radio); Bronze: Women of Steel (The Wave and Swansea Sound)	Gold: Radio 1 Breakfast: #MakeThisGreg (BBC Radio 1); Silver: England's Winter Tours of Sri Lanka and the West Indies (talkSPORT); Bronze: Absolute Radio 10 (Absolute Radio)	Gold: Mental Health Awareness Week (Absolute Radio); Silver: Cricket World Cup Final (BBC Radio 5 Live); Bronze: Great North Run (Metro Radio)
Best Local Radio Show	John Myers Award for Local Station of the Year	National Station or Network of the Year
Gold: Boogie in the Morning (Forth 1); Silver: Allison Ferns (BBC Radio Surrey & BBC Sussex); Bronze: Justin Dealey (BBC Three Counties Radio)	Gold: BBC Hereford & Worcester; Silver: Stray FM; Bronze: BBC Radio Sheffield	Gold: BBC Radio 2; Silver: Absolute Radio Network; Bronze: BBC Radio 1Xtra
Best Fictional Storytelling	Radio Times Moment of The Year	The GOLD Awards
Gold: Forest 404 (BBC Radio 4); Silver: A View From A Hill (Bafflegab Productions for Audible); Bronze: First Do No Harm (BBC Radio 4)	Gold: Overdosing man calls Iain Lee (Talkradio); Silver: England win the Cricket World Cup (Test Match Special); Bronze: Live from the helicopter crash site (BBC Radio Leicester)	talkSPORT (20 years of broadcasting and their commitment to diversity and representation in sport in the last year); Jazz FM (30 years of broadcasting and their contribution to the genre of Jazz); Tay FM (40 years of broadcasting and their contribution to the community of Tayside and Fife)

== ARIAs 2021 ==
The nominees were announced on 21 April 2021. Due to COVID-19 restrictions the 2021 awards ceremony was an hybrid event with just 100 invited guests in a small theatre at The May Fair Hotel. In recognition of content produced to support audiences in lockdown, new categories included The Creative Innovation Award, The Impact Award and The 2020 Special Award.

Presented: 26 May 2021 at The May Fair Hotel – Hosts: Jordan Banjo & Perri Kiely of Kiss FM
Best New Presenter	Best New Show	Best News Coverage
Gold: Poppy Begum (BBC Asian Network); Silver: Khalid Dovie – VENT (VICE & Brent 2020); Bronze: Daniel Rosney (BBC Newsbeat)	Gold: The YUNGBLUD Podcast (BBC Radio 1 / BBC Sounds); Silver: The Skewer (Unusual Productions for BBC Radio 4); Bronze: VENT documentaries (VICE & Brent 2020)	Gold: 100 Days of Lockdown (BBC Newsbeat); Silver: Stories of our Times: The Monkey Vaccine (Wireless Studios for The Times); Bronze: My Mother's Murder (Tortoise Media)
Best Speech Breakfast Show	Best Speech Presenter	Best Sports Show
Gold: talkSPORT; Silver: BBC Radio Nottingham; Bronze: Aasmah Mir and Stig Abell (Times Radio)	Gold: George the Poet – Have You Heard George's Podcast? (BBC Sounds); Silver: Anushka Asthana – Today in Focus (Guardian News & Media); Bronze: Elis James and John Robins – Audio Always (BBC Radio 5 Live)	Gold: Coming in From the Cold (Unedited for talkSPORT); Silver: The Women's Sports Show (BBC Radio London); Bronze: The High Performance Podcast (Rethink Audio & Jake Humphrey)
Best Music Breakfast Show	Best Music Entertainment Show	Best Specialist Music Show
Gold: Radio 1 Breakfast with Greg James; Silver: Fleur East (Hits Radio); Bronze: Boogie in the Morning (Forth 1)	Gold: Scott Mills (BBC Audio for BBC Radio 1); Silver: The Snoochie Shy Show (TBI Media for BBC Radio 1Xtra); Bronze: Free Flow (National Prison Radio)	Gold: Jamz Supernova (Somethin' Else for BBC Radio 1Xtra); Silver: The Music of James Bond with David Arnold (Scala Radio); Bronze: Michael Morpurgo's Folk Journeys (7digital for BBC Radio 4)
The Comedy Award	Best Factual – Single programme	Best Factual – Series
Gold: The Skewer (Unusual Productions for BBC Radio 4); Silver: Sketchtopia (Gusman Productions for BBC Radio 4); Bronze: The Jason Manford Show (Absolute Radio)	Gold: Sabrina's Boy (George the Poet for BBC Sounds); Silver: Problem Kids (VICE & Brent 2020); Bronze: Death Row Book Club (BBC World Service)	Gold: The Punch (Just Radio for BBC Radio 4); Silver: Coming in From the Cold (Unedited for talkSPORT); Bronze: Hillsborough: The Full Story (BBC Radio Merseyside)
The Grassroots Award	Best Independent Podcast	Best Station Sound
Gold: VENT (VICE & Brent 2020); Silver: Ocean Youth Radio (Sound Communities); Bronze: Dig Deep for Homeless Oxfordshire (JACK FM)	Gold: The Bellingcat Podcast (Novel); Silver: Tales from the Tannoy (Sayer Hamilton and Tadah Media); Bronze: Witness from Amnesty International (White Stiletto Productions)	Gold: BBC Radio 1 (BBC Popular Music Station Sound); Silver: talkSPORT (Wireless Creative); Bronze: Absolute Radio 40s (Absolute Radio Production)
Best Commercial Partnership	Best Marketing Campaign	The Impact Award
Gold: Magic Euro Song with Netflix (TBI Media and Magic Radio); Silver: Untold Killing podcast (Message Heard & Remembering Srebrenica); Bronze: Scottish Government & SAM Radio (Bauer Scotland)	Gold: Alan Partridge: From the Oasthouse (Audible); Silver: Make a Difference with Your BBC Local Radio Station (BBC Marketing & Audiences for BBC England); Bronze: Britain's Best Beer Garden (Union JACK Radio)	Gold: The Black Power Playlist (BBC Audio for BBC Radio 1Xtra); Silver: Where is George Gibney? (Second Captains for BBC Sounds); Bronze: Untold Killing podcast (Message Heard & Remembering Srebrenica)
Best Local Radio Show	John Myers Award for Local Station of the Year	National Station or Network of the Year
Gold: The Andrew Peach Show (BBC Radio Berkshire); Silver: Jack's Morning Glory with Trevor Marshall (JACK FM); Bronze: The Breakfast Show with Leanne & Scott (Radio City)	Gold: BBC Radio Sheffield; Silver: Clyde 1; Bronze: BBC Radio Wales	Gold: Magic Radio; Silver: talkSPORT Network; Bronze: BBC Radio 5 Live
Best Fictional Storytelling	The Creative Innovation Award	The 2020 Special Award
Gold: Eight Point Nine Nine (BBC Audio Bristol for BBC Radio 4); Silver: Red Earth Red Sky (BBC Audio Drama North for BBC Radio 4); Bronze: Have You Heard George's Podcast? (George the Poet for BBC Sounds)	Gold: Absolute Radio 40s (TBI Media for Absolute Radio); Silver: Have You Heard George's Podcast? (George the Poet for BBC Sounds); Bronze: Prison Bag (Falling Tree Productions for National Prison Radio)	Gold: Life on Lockdown (White Stiletto Productions for BBC Radio 4); Silver: Absolute Radio 40s (TBI Media for Absolute Radio); Bronze: Coronavirus Newscast (BBC News for BBC Sounds)
Radio Times Moment of The Year
Gold: Jordan Banjo and Perri Kiely react to Diversity's Black Lives Matter performance on Britain's Got Talent (Kiss FM); Silver: Scotland qualify for Euro 2020 on The Big Scotland Football Show (Bauer Scotland); Bronze: Ian Wright remembers Mr. Pigden on Desert Island Discs (BBC Radio 4)

== ARIAs 2022 ==
The nominees were announced on 5 April 2022. The awards ceremony was once again a live in-person event after the lifting of COVID-19 restrictions. Ivor Norvello Award-winning Tom Odell and two-time BRIT award-winning Heather Small both performed at the awards, with Heather Small opening the ceremony. This year marked the inaugural Pioneer Award, which was bestowed on Janice Long.

Presented: 3 May 2022 at The Adelphi Theatre – Hosts: Rylan Clark with a live voice-over from Fleur East
Best New Presenter	Best New Show	Best News Coverage
Gold: James Phillips (National Prison Radio); Silver: Lianne Sanderson (talkSPORT); Bronze: Rima Ahmed (BBC Radio Leeds)	Gold: Decode (Reduced Listening for Spotify); Silver: The Unfiltered History Tour (VICE World News); Bronze: Uncanny (Bafflegab Productions for BBC Radio 4)	Gold: "George Floyd Killing: The Trial" – Today Programme (BBC Radio 4); Silver: The Slow Newscast (Tortoise Studios); Bronze: I Walk with Women (Bauer Media)
Best Speech Breakfast Show	Best Speech Presenter	Best Sports Show
Gold: The Wake Up Call (BBC Radio Kent); Silver: Vanessa Feltz (BBC Radio London); Bronze: Breakfast with Aasmah Mir and Stig Abell (Times Radio)	Gold: Emma Barnett – Woman's Hour (BBC Radio 4); Silver: Mathilda Mallinson & Helena Wadia (Media Storm podcast); Bronze: Manveen Rana (Stories of our Times podcast)	Gold: Fight of the Century (TBI Media for BBC Radio 5 Live); Silver: Farewell Bootham Crescent (BBC Radio York); Bronze: Game Day Exclusive (talkSPORT)
Best Music Breakfast Show	Best Music Entertainment Show	Best Specialist Music Show
Gold: The Dave Berry Breakfast Show (Absolute Radio); Silver: Breakfast with Greg James (BBC Radio 1); Bronze: Bowie at Breakfast (Clyde 1)	Gold: The last Radio 1's Dance Party with Annie Mac (We are Grape for BBC Radio 1); Silver: Garry Spence (Clyde 1); Bronze: The Rock Show (National Prison Radio)	Gold: Decode (Reduced Listening for Spotify); Silver: Folk on Foot podcast (Matthew Bannister); Bronze: 1Xtra's Rap Show with Tiffany Calver (BBC Audio for BBC Radio 1Xtra)
The Comedy Award	Best Factual – Single programme	Best Factual – Series
Gold: The Skewer (Unusual Productions for BBC Radio 4); Silver: Cold Case Crime Cuts (Unusual Productions); Bronze: Rosie Jones: Box Ticker Too (Dabster Productions for BBC Radio 4)	Gold: The Nazi Next Door (BBC Radio 4); Silver: Lights Out: The Last Taboo (Falling Tree Productions for BBC Radio 4); Bronze: Have You Heard George's Podcast: Mavado & Vybz – George the Poet (BBC Sounds)	Gold: Harsh Reality: The Story of Miriam Rivera (Novel for Wondery); Silver: I'm Not a Monster (BBC News for BBC Radio 5 Live and BBC Sounds); Bronze: The Hijack (Goldhawk Productions for Audible)
The Grassroots Award	Best Independent Podcast	Best Station Sound
Gold: We are VOICES podcast (The VOICES Network and British Red Cross); Silver: IVF Dad podcast (18Sixty); Bronze: Fully Amplified podcast (Futures Theatre and Reduced Listening)	Gold: The Long Time Academy (Scenery Studios, Headspace Studios and The Long Time Project); Silver: Why Do I Feel? (Bite Your Tongue Productions); Bronze: Wild Crimes (Whistledown Productions, for the Natural History Museum)	Gold: BBC Radio 1Xtra (BBC Popular Music Station Sound); Silver: Absolute Radio Country (launch); Bronze: BBC Radio 6 Music (BBC Popular Music Station Sound)
Best Commercial Partnership	Best Marketing Campaign	The Impact Award
Gold: Puffin Podcast: Mission Imagination (Mags Creative and Puffin Books); Silver: Bedtime Stories (Audio Always and Dreams); Bronze: The Dave Berry Breakfast Show (Absolute Radio and Wickes)	Gold: UEFA Euro 2020 (talkSPORT); Silver 100% Christmas (Magic Radio); Bronze: Make a Difference (BBC Local Radio)	Gold: Woman's Hour: "Trafficked in Plain Sight"(BBC Audio for BBC Radio 4); Silver: BARS with Lady Unchained (Folded Wing for National Prison Radio); Bronze: KISS Life with Swarzy (Playmaker Group for KISS)
Best Local Radio Show	John Myers Award for Local Station of the Year	National Station or Network of the Year
Gold: Justin Dealey (BBC Three Counties Radio); Silver: Ewen & Cat at Breakfast (Clyde 2 and Greatest Hits Network Scotland); Bronze: Gary Philipson (BBC Radio Tees)	Gold: Clyde 1; Silver: BBC Radio Newcastle; Bronze: BBC Radio Ulster	Gold: Hits Radio; Silver: BBC Radio 4; Bronze: KISS Network
Best Fictional Storytelling	The Creative Innovation Award	Best Coverage of an Event
Gold: Little Blue Lines (BBC Audio for BBC Radio 4); Silver: You & Me (Naked Productions for BBC Radio 4); Bronze: The Old Man in the Boat (Message Heard Media for Fun Kids)	Gold: Life Sentence (Mags Creative); Silver: The Battersea Poltergeist (Bafflegab Productions for BBC Radio 4); Bronze: The Unfiltered History Tour (VICE World News)	Gold: Liverpool Together (BBC Radio Merseyside); Silver: What Happened When The World Came To Glasgow? (Hits Radio Scotland); Bronze: UEFA Euro 2020 Final (talkSPORT)
Radio Times Moment of The Year
Gold: Adele Roberts returns to radio after bowel cancer treatment (BBC Radio 1); Silver: Mary wins £102,000 (Clyde 1); Bronze: Annie Mac's last show (BBC Radio 1)
The Pioneer Award
Janice Long (awarded posthumously)

== ARIAs 2023 ==
The nominees were announced on 30 March 2023. Two award categories were retired; Best Independent Podcast and Best Marketing Campaign, and replaced by four new categories; Best Community Station of the Year, Best Audiobook or Reading and a split of Best New Show into Best New Radio Show and Best New Podcast. In addition, Best Fictional Storytelling which in previous years had included readings became Best Drama. There was also a one-off 2022 Special Award recognising audio coverage following the death of Her Majesty Queen Elizabeth II, bringing the total number of awards to 28. A change of venue was also announced.

On 21 April 2023 it was revealed that Tony Blackburn would be receiving this year's Pioneer Award for his near 60 years in broadcasting and contribution to the popularity of soul music in the UK. Tim Blackmore was announced as guest of honour at this years ceremony in recognition of his contribution to radio and audio over the past six decades.

Presented: 2 May 2023 at The Theatre Royal, Drury Lane – Hosts: Rylan Clark with a live voice-over from Fleur East
Best New Presenter	Best New Radio Show	Best News Coverage
Gold: Zak and Jules (Life After Prison podcast); Silver: Harriet Rose (KISS FM); Bronze: Alyx Holcombe (BBC Introducing Rock on Radio 1)	Gold: Room 5 (BBC Radio 4); Silver: Shaun Keaveny’s Community Garden Radio; Bronze: Patrick Kielty (Banana Stand for BBC Radio 5 Live)	Gold: The Smugglers’ Trail (BBC Audio Documentaries Unit for BBC Radio 4); Silver: Stories of Our Times: The British Man Rescuing Ukrainians from Putin’s War (Wireless Studios for The Times); Bronze: Sitrep: Inside Ukraine’s Capital (BFBS – The Forces Station)
Best Speech Breakfast Show	Best Speech Presenter	Best Sports Show
Gold: 5 Live Breakfast (BBC Radio 5 Live); Silver: Today (BBC Radio 4); Bronze: Good Morning Ulster (BBC Radio Ulster)	Gold: Adrian Durham (talkSPORT); Silver: Dan Snow (History Hit podcast); Bronze: Helena Merriman (BBC Radio 4)	Gold: Moment of Truth (Folding Pocket Productions for BBC Sounds); Silver: The Big Saturday Football Show (Forth 1 & Hits Radio Scotland); Bronze: Fast and Loose (Novel for Wondery)
Best Music Breakfast Show	Best Music Entertainment Show	Best Specialist Music Show
Gold: 1Xtra Breakfast with Nadia Jae (BBC Audio for BBC Radio 1Xtra); Silver: Big John @ Breakfast (Hallam FM); Bronze: Radio 1 Breakfast with Greg James (BBC Audio for BBC Radio 1)	Gold: Craig Charles (Audio Always for BBC Radio 6 Music); Silver: My Life (Mighty Mouth Productions for Fun Kids); Bronze: Throwback Throwdown (We Are Grape for BBC Sounds)	Gold: For the Love of Hip Hop with Romesh Ranganathan (Folded Wing for BBC Radio 2); Silver: Night Tracks (BBC Audio for BBC Radio 3); Bronze: National Prison Radio’s Rock Show (Prison Radio Association)
The Comedy Award	Best Factual – Single programme	Best Factual – Series
Gold: The Skewer: The Queen (Unusual for BBC Radio 4); Silver: Nature Table (BBC Studios for BBC Radio 4); Bronze: From The Oasthouse: The Alan Partridge Podcast, Series 2 (Baby Cow for Audible)	Gold: File on 4: Isobel’s Story (BBC Radio 4); Silver: Justice for The 97 (BBC Radio Merseyside); Bronze: Nightwatch (BBC Scotland Productions for BBC Radio 4)	Gold: In Dark Corners (BBC Scotland Productions for BBC Radio 4); Silver: Who Killed Daphne? (Wondery); Bronze: Assume Nothing: The Last Request (BBC Radio Ulster)
The Grassroots Award	Best New Podcast	Best Station Sound
Gold: United Against Knife Crime (BBC Radio Merseyside); Silver: Life After Prison podcast (Prison Radio Association); Bronze: Ocean Youth Radio	Gold: Colouring in Britain (BBC Sounds Audio Lab); Silver: Go Love Yourself (Crowd Network); Bronze: Off The Beaten Jack (Jack Boswell)	Gold: BBC Radio 1Xtra (BBC Popular Music Station Sound); Silver: Fix Radio (Devaweb and Fix Radio); Bronze: The FIFA World Cup Qatar 2022 on talkSPORT (Wireless Creative)
Best Commercial Partnership	Best Music Special	The Impact Award
Gold: Magic Radio Breakfast with On the Beach; Silver: Free Flow sponsored by [the Shannon Trust (National Prison Radio); Bronze: The Thursday Team Talk with Macmillan Cancer Support (talkSPORT)	Gold: Deep Hidden Meaning Radio with Nile Rodgers (Apple Music Radio); Silver: A Career in Music with Harmony Samuels (Cast Iron Radio for BBC Radio 4); Bronze: Pass The Mic (Novel for KISS FM)	Gold: You, Me, and the Big C (BBC Radio 5 Live); Silver: In Dark Corners (BBC Scotland Productions for BBC Radio 4); Bronze: Justice for Joseph (Hits Radio Manchester)
Best Local Show	John Myers Award for Local Station of the Year	National Station or Network of the Year
Gold: Breakfast with Mylo & Rosie (Pulse 1); Silver: Justin Dealey (BBC Three Counties Radio); Bronze: The Big Saturday Football Show (Forth 1 & Hits Radio Scotland)	Gold: Clyde 1; Silver: BBC Radio Merseyside; Bronze: BBC Radio Ulster	Gold: BBC Radio 4; Silver: talkSPORT; Bronze: BBC Radio 6 Music
Best Drama	The Creative Innovation Award	Best Coverage of an Event
Gold: Dear Harry Kane (BBC Audio Drama London for BBC Radio 4); Silver: Algorithms (RooksNest for Audible); Bronze: The Rez (Rezilience and Gen Z Media)	Gold: Mission Transmission (Fun Kids); Silver: Soundworlds: Stories of the Stalked (Ventureland for Audible); Bronze: Murder Mystery (BBC Audio for BBC Radio 1)	Gold: Mental Health Awareness Week (Absolute Radio); Silver: The Discovery of Endurance (Dan Snow’s History Hit podcast); Bronze: The FIFA World Cup Qatar 2022 (talkSPORT)
Best Audiobook or Reading	Community Station of the Year	The 2022 Special Award (following the death of Her Majesty The Queen)
Gold: A Heart That Works by Rob Delaney (Coronet Books); Silver: This is Not a Pity Memoir by Abi Morgan (BBC Audio Books for BBC Sounds and BBC Radio 4); Bronze: Voices in the Valley by Andrew Michael Hurley (BBC Audio Books for BBC Radio 4)	Gold: Vectis Radio (The Isle of Wight); Silver: Bro Radio (The Vale of Glamorgan); Bronze: Pride Radio (North East of England)	Gold: Daily news reportage (Jonny Dymond and James Bryant for BBC News); Silver: The Skewer: The Queen (Unusual for BBC Radio 4); Bronze: The Second Elizabethan Age (Tortoise Media)
Radio Times Moment of The Year
Gold: Tony Livesey won’t say goodbye to Dame Deborah James (BBC Radio 5 Live); Silver: Fun Kids’ Mission Transmission; Bronze: Liz Truss BBC Local Radio interviews
The Pioneer Award
Tony Blackburn for almost 60 years in broadcasting and contribution to the popularity of soul music in the UK

== ARIAs 2024 ==
Best New Presenter	Best New Radio Show	Best News Coverage
Gold: Caroline Steel - BBC Science Radio Unit; Silver: Rob Burrow - BBC Radio Leeds; Bronze: Ali Ali - Prison Radio Association	Gold: Tim's Listening Party - Absolute Radio; Silver: Unexpected Elements - BBC World Service; Bronze: Takeover Tuesdays - Prison Radio Association	Gold: Shiny Bob: The Devil’s Advocate - BBC Scotland News; Silver: Israel-Hamas War Coverage - Times Radio; Bronze: Pod Save The UK - Reduced Listening / Crooked Media
Best Speech Breakfast Show	Best Speech Presenter	Best Sports Show
Gold: Matt Bailey at Breakfast - BBC Radio Newcastle; Silver: talkSPORT Breakfast - talkSPORT; Bronze: 5 Live Breakfast - BBC Radio 5 Live	Gold: Adrian Durham (talkSPORT); Silver: Dan Snow (History Hit podcast); Bronze: Helena Merriman (BBC Radio 4)	Gold: Moment of Truth (Folding Pocket Productions for BBC Sounds); Silver: The Big Saturday Football Show (Forth 1 & Hits Radio Scotland); Bronze: Fast and Loose (Novel for Wondery)
Best Music Breakfast Show	Best Music Entertainment Show	Best Specialist Music Show
Gold: 1Xtra Breakfast with Nadia Jae (BBC Audio for BBC Radio 1Xtra); Silver: Big John @ Breakfast (Hallam FM); Bronze: Radio 1 Breakfast with Greg James (BBC Audio for BBC Radio 1)	Gold: Craig Charles (Audio Always for BBC Radio 6 Music); Silver: My Life (Mighty Mouth Productions for Fun Kids); Bronze: Throwback Throwdown (We Are Grape for BBC Sounds)	Gold: For the Love of Hip Hop with Romesh Ranganathan (Folded Wing for BBC Radio 2); Silver: Night Tracks (BBC Audio for BBC Radio 3); Bronze: National Prison Radio’s Rock Show (Prison Radio Association)
The Comedy Award	Best Factual – Single programme	Best Factual – Series
Gold: The Skewer: The Queen (Unusual for BBC Radio 4); Silver: Nature Table (BBC Studios for BBC Radio 4); Bronze: From The Oasthouse: The Alan Partridge Podcast, Series 2 (Baby Cow for Audible)	Gold: File on 4: Isobel’s Story (BBC Radio 4); Silver: Justice for The 97 (BBC Radio Merseyside); Bronze: Nightwatch (BBC Scotland Productions for BBC Radio 4)	Gold: In Dark Corners (BBC Scotland Productions for BBC Radio 4); Silver: Who Killed Daphne? (Wondery); Bronze: Assume Nothing: The Last Request (BBC Radio Ulster)
The Grassroots Award	Best New Podcast	Best Station Sound
Gold: United Against Knife Crime (BBC Radio Merseyside); Silver: Life After Prison podcast (Prison Radio Association); Bronze: Ocean Youth Radio	Gold: Colouring in Britain (BBC Sounds Audio Lab); Silver: Go Love Yourself (Crowd Network); Bronze: Off The Beaten Jack (Jack Boswell)	Gold: BBC Radio 1Xtra (BBC Popular Music Station Sound); Silver: Fix Radio (Devaweb and Fix Radio); Bronze: The FIFA World Cup Qatar 2022 on talkSPORT (Wireless Creative)
Best Commercial Partnership	Best Music Special	The Impact Award
Gold: Magic Radio Breakfast with On the Beach; Silver: Free Flow sponsored by [the Shannon Trust (National Prison Radio); Bronze: The Thursday Team Talk with Macmillan Cancer Support (talkSPORT)	Gold: Deep Hidden Meaning Radio with Nile Rodgers (Apple Music Radio); Silver: A Career in Music with Harmony Samuels (Cast Iron Radio for BBC Radio 4); Bronze: Pass The Mic (Novel for KISS FM)	Gold: You, Me, and the Big C (BBC Radio 5 Live); Silver: In Dark Corners (BBC Scotland Productions for BBC Radio 4); Bronze: Justice for Joseph (Hits Radio Manchester)
Best Local Show	John Myers Award for Local Station of the Year	National Station or Network of the Year
Gold: Breakfast with Mylo & Rosie (Pulse 1); Silver: Justin Dealey (BBC Three Counties Radio); Bronze: The Big Saturday Football Show (Forth 1 & Hits Radio Scotland)	Gold: Clyde 1; Silver: BBC Radio Merseyside; Bronze: BBC Radio Ulster	Gold: BBC Radio 4; Silver: talkSPORT; Bronze: BBC Radio 6 Music
Best Drama	The Creative Innovation Award	Best Coverage of an Event
Gold: Dear Harry Kane (BBC Audio Drama London for BBC Radio 4); Silver: Algorithms (RooksNest for Audible); Bronze: The Rez (Rezilience and Gen Z Media)	Gold: Mission Transmission (Fun Kids); Silver: Soundworlds: Stories of the Stalked (Ventureland for Audible); Bronze: Murder Mystery (BBC Audio for BBC Radio 1)	Gold: Mental Health Awareness Week (Absolute Radio); Silver: The Discovery of Endurance (Dan Snow’s History Hit podcast); Bronze: The FIFA World Cup Qatar 2022 (talkSPORT)
Best Audiobook or Reading	Community Station of the Year	The 2022 Special Award (following the death of Her Majesty The Queen)
Gold: A Heart That Works by Rob Delaney (Coronet Books); Silver: This is Not a Pity Memoir by Abi Morgan (BBC Audio Books for BBC Sounds and BBC Radio 4); Bronze: Voices in the Valley by Andrew Michael Hurley (BBC Audio Books for BBC Radio 4)	Gold: Vectis Radio (The Isle of Wight); Silver: Bro Radio (The Vale of Glamorgan); Bronze: Pride Radio (North East of England)	Gold: Daily news reportage (Jonny Dymond and James Bryant for BBC News); Silver: The Skewer: The Queen (Unusual for BBC Radio 4); Bronze: The Second Elizabethan Age (Tortoise Media)
Radio Times Moment of The Year
Gold: Tony Livesey won’t say goodbye to Dame Deborah James (BBC Radio 5 Live); Silver: Fun Kids’ Mission Transmission; Bronze: Liz Truss BBC Local Radio interviews

== ARIAs 2025 ==
=== Full list of nominees ===
==== Best Commercial Partnership Award ====
- Dead River – Audio Always for Pogust Goodhead
- Empowering Young Lives – KISS and KFC
- Fun Kids Teacher of the Year with Collection Pot – Fun Kids
- Hold or Fold with GambleAware – Prison Radio Association
- The Mid.Point: Sweaty Betty Special – Spiritland Productions
- Scottish Island Adventures – The Big Light

==== Best Event Coverage Award ====
- BBC Proms 2024 – BBC Radio 3
- Coldplay go Orange for Luton – BBC Three Counties Radio
- Coverage of the Paralympics – RNIB Connect Radio
- Forest are Magic – Forest Focus
- Isle of Man TT Races: The TT Podcast – Audio Always
- Magic Celebrates Diwali – Magic Radio
- Radio 1’s Pedal Power for Red Nose Day – BBC Radio 1
- Superscoreboard at EURO 2024 – Clyde 1
- Sycamore Gap: One Year On – National Trust

==== Best Drama or Fiction Award ====
- 1984 – Audible
- Central Intelligence – Goldhawk Productions for BBC Radio 4
- Life & Time – BBC Radio 4
- The Mysterious Affair at Styles: A Poirot Mystery – Audible
- One Hundred and Fifty Days – BBC Audio Scotland for BBC Radio 4
- Ruthie Henshall Sees Dead People – Magic Radio
- The Skies Are Watching – Goldhawk Productions for BBC Radio 4
- UNSINKABLE – Datura Studios and North Atlantic Ridge in association with B7 Media and AudioMarvels
- Zeroes – BBC Studios Audio for Audible

==== Best Comedy Award (Show or Presenter) ====
- Christmas Dinner with Kurupt FM – Prison Radio Association
- Green Wing: Resuscitated – Audible
- Help I Sexted My Boss – Audio Always
- IM1: 60 Years and Counting, Sadly… – Manx Radio
- Mark Steel’s in Town – BBC Radio 4
- The Menagerie – Radio M29
- The Skewer – Unusual Productions for BBC Radio 4
- Time of the Week – DLT Entertainment for BBC Radio 4
- Where There’s A Will, There’s A Wake – Sony Music Entertainment

==== Best Factual Series Award ====
- Band Aid at 40 – Gimme Sugar Productions for Virgin Radio
- Country Lines – Falling Tree Productions for BBC Radio 4
- Grenfell: Building a Disaster – BBC Radio 4
- Intrigue: To Catch a Scorpion – BBC Radio 4
- Ken Bruce on Drums – Jazz FM
- Kill List – Novel and Wondery
- The Pitcairn Trial – Audio Always
- The Trapped – ITN / ITV News
- The Story of No. 1: Lauryn Hill’s the Miseducation of Lauryn Hill – 100 Best Albums Radio, Apple Music

==== Best Factual Single Episode Award ====
- Between the Ears: Henry Mancini – BBC Radio 3
- Black Box – The Guardian
- The Daily T: The Grenfell inquiry that ‘delayed justice’ – The Telegraph
- Deep Hidden Meaning: will.i.am – Apple Music Radio
- Degraded by Deepfakes: File on 4 Investigates – BBC Radio 4
- Esther Ghey & Jaxon Feeley: Reclaiming influence – Virgin Radio Pridecast
- NATO75: An Alliance Rescue – BFBS
- Our Whole Life is a Secret – BBC Radio 4
- The Weekend Intelligence: A Portrait of the Proud Boys – The Economist

==== Best Music Award (Show or Presenter) ====
- Annie Nightingale: A Life in Music – We Are Grape for BBC Radio 1
- Radio 1’s Dance Party with Danny Howard – BBC Radio 1
- Classical Connections Radio with Alexis Ffrench – Apple Music Radio
- The Dance Music Archive with Andi Durrant – This is Distorted for KISSTORY
- The Eras Podcast, hosted by Abbie McCarthy – Good Karma
- Free Flow – Prison Radio Association
- Folk on Foot – Matthew Bannister
- Indie Forever – We are Grape for BBC Radio 6 Music
- Phil Taggart’s ChillDaBeats – Slack Panda Productions

==== Best Music Breakfast Radio Show ====
- The Bald Builders Breakfast – Fix Radio
- Boogie in the Morning – Forth 1
- Bowie@Breakfast – Clyde 1
- Breakfast – BBC Radio 3
- Breakfast with Greg James – BBC Radio 1
- Breakfast with Nadia Jae – BBC Radio 1Xtra

==== Best Music Entertainment Award (Show or Presenter) ====
- Barry Island Discs: Gavin & Stacey’s Big Songs Send Off – BBC Radio Wales
- The Cavern Podcast – The Cavern Club
- Earlier… with Jools Holland – BBC Radio 3
- Gemma Atkinson & Mike Toolan – Hits Radio
- Haroon Rashid – BBC Asian Network
- Hometime with Bush and Richie – Absolute Radio
- Ruthie Henshall Sees Dead People – Magic Radio
- Scott Mills – BBC Radio 2
- The Simon Mayo Drivetime Show – Greatest Hits Radio

==== Best New Presenter ====
- Beth Wallace – Forth 1
- Bronwen Lewis – BBC Radio Wales
- Chance Litchfield – Fix Radio
- Emma Nagouse – Muses: An Ampersand Podcast
- Helen Pidd – The Guardian
- May Robson – BBC Sounds Audio Lab
- Niall Breslin – The Madman’s Hotel, Audible
- Phoebe McIndoe – Falling Tree Productions for BBC Radio 4
- Scout Tzofiya Bolton – Prison Radio Association

==== Best News or Current Affairs Award ====
- 90 Seconds to Midnight – Daily Mail
- The 2024 ‘Genny Lex’ – KISS
- Attempted Assassination of Donald Trump – Times Radio
- The Boys Are Not Alright – Audio Always for BBC Radio 4
- Electoral Dysfunction – Sky News
- Intrigue: To Catch a Scorpion – BBC Radio 4
- Pod Save The UK – Reduced Listening and Crooked Media
- Sitrep – BFBS
- Southport – BBC Radio Merseyside

==== Best Sonic Branding Award ====
- BBC Radio 1
- BBC Radio 2
- BBC Radio 3 Unwind
- Clyde 1 Superscoreboard
- Fix Radio
- Greatest Hits Radio 60s

==== Best Speech Breakfast Radio Show Award ====
- 5 Live Breakfast – BBC Radio 5 Live
- The Graham Liver Breakfast Show – BBC Radio Lancashire
- The Kevin Duala Breakfast Show – BBC Radio Merseyside
- talkSPORT Breakfast – talkSPORT
- Times Radio Breakfast – Times Radio
- Today – BBC Radio 4

==== Best Speech Entertainment Award (Show or Presenter) ====
- Believe In People: Addiction, Recovery & Stigma – ReNew
- British Scandal – Wondery & Samizdat Audio
- Elis James and John Robins – Audio Always for BBC Radio 5 Live
- Help I sexted My Boss – Audio Always
- Jon Holmes Says The C-Word – Unusual Productions for BBC Radio 4
- Josie Long – Falling Tree Productions for BBC Radio 4
- The Louis Theroux Podcast – Mindhouse Productions
- Matt Chorley – BBC Radio 5 Live
- Overnights With Martin Kelner – talkSPORT

==== Best Sports Award (Show or Presenter) ====
- The Big Scottish Football Show – Forth 1
- From Extinction to Promotion – BBC Radio Derby Sport
- Gameday – talkSPORT
- Guardian Football Weekly – The Guardian
- Men in Blazers: Early Kick Off – Men in Blazers and Footwork Media for Wondery
- P1 with Matt & Tommy – Stak
- Premier League Sunday – BBC Radio 5 Live
- Test Match Special – BBC Radio 5 Live
- White & Jordan – talkSPORT

==== The Creative or Technical Innovation Award ====
- 6 Music’s Way with Words – Audio Always for BBC Radio 6 Music
- The Ballad of Scout and the Alcohol Tag – Prison Radio Association
- Fun Kids Space Station – Fun Kids
- Fun Kids Time Machine – Fun Kids
- The Gossip Gays: Who Killed Danny Beard? – Audio Always
- Help I Sexted My Boss, in cinemas – Audio Always
- Lowlines – Social Broadcasts and Scenery Studios
- OUTCAST UK with Graeme Smith – 7th Planet for Virgin Radio Pride
- Sleep Tracks – Peanut & Crumb for BBC Radio 3 Unwind (produced by Alice Boyd and Joy Nkoyo)

==== The Social Impact Award ====
- Assume Nothing – Femicide: Eight Steps to Stop a Murder – BBC Radio Ulster
- Black History Month: Raising The Next Generation – Hits Radio
- Clare’s Law: A Decade of Saving Lives – Hits Radio
- The Culture Colonel – BFBS
- Intrigue: To Catch a Scorpion – BBC Radio 4
- Life After Prison – Prison Radio Association
- The Madman’s Hotel – Audible
- The Quiet Place – BBC Radio 5 Live
- The Quilt – Aunt Nell

==== Local Radio Station of the Year ====
- BBC Radio Cornwall
- BBC Radio Ulster
- BBC Radio Derby
- Forth 1
- Clyde 1
- Portsmouth’s Express FM

==== UK Audio Brand of the Year ====
- Apple Music Radio
- BBC Sounds
- Goalhanger Podcasts
- Rayo – Bauer Media Audio UK
- Tortoise Media
- Yoto

==== UK Radio Station or Radio Network of the Year ====
- BBC Asian Network
- BBC Radio 3
- BBC Radio 5 Live
- Fun Kids
- Greatest Hits Radio
- talkSPORT

==== Radio Times Moment of the Year ====
- Johnnie Walker’s Final Show on Sounds of the 70’s – Listen for BBC Radio 2
- Radio 4’s PM Laura Trott Interview – BBC Radio 4
- Sunday Love Songs Remembering Steve Wright – BBC Radio 2
- ‘I want my mum to die’ – Stuart George on BBC Radio Stoke
- Coldplay go Orange for Luton – BBC 3 Counties Radio
- BBC Radio 4’s Today: Mishal Husain and James Cleverly – BBC News
- A listener unexpectedly calls Cristo Foufas’ final show to thank him for saving his life – TALK
- Marjorie Taylor Greene blames media for Trump assassination attempt – Times Radio
- Dan Noble speaks out about the far-right riots across the UK – Absolute Radio
- Frank off the Radio – The Frank Skinner Project, Avalon
