= Robbie Collin =

British film critic

Robbie Collin is a British film critic.

Collin studied aesthetics and the philosophy of film at the University of St Andrews, Scotland. He edited the university's student newspaper, The Saint.

Collin has been the chief film critic at The Daily Telegraph since 2011. From 2007 to 2011 he wrote a weekly film column for the News of the World until the newspaper's closure. That year he was shortlisted for Critic of the Year at the British Press Awards, and was shortlisted again in 2017, when he was highly commended by the jury.

He appeared on the Channel 4 Vue Film Show, presented by Edith Bowman, and contributed to the BBC Radio 2 Arts Show with Claudia Winkleman. In August 2013 he guest presented BBC Radio 4's Film programme. He guest-presents Kermode and Mayo's Film Review, also with Edith Bowman, Sanjeev Bhaskar and Ben Bailey Smith. In 2020 he presented an episode of Life Cinematic on BBC Four.

Collin is an active member of the London Film Critics' Circle. He has served on juries at the Cannes Film Festival, Raindance Film Festival, London Russian Film Festival and the British Independent Film Awards.

In 2026 Collin selected “The 50 Greatest Films of All Time” for the Telegraph, with Singin' in the Rain at number one.
