= Radio Feltham =

Prison radio station in London, England

Coordinates: 51.44051°N 0.43530°W

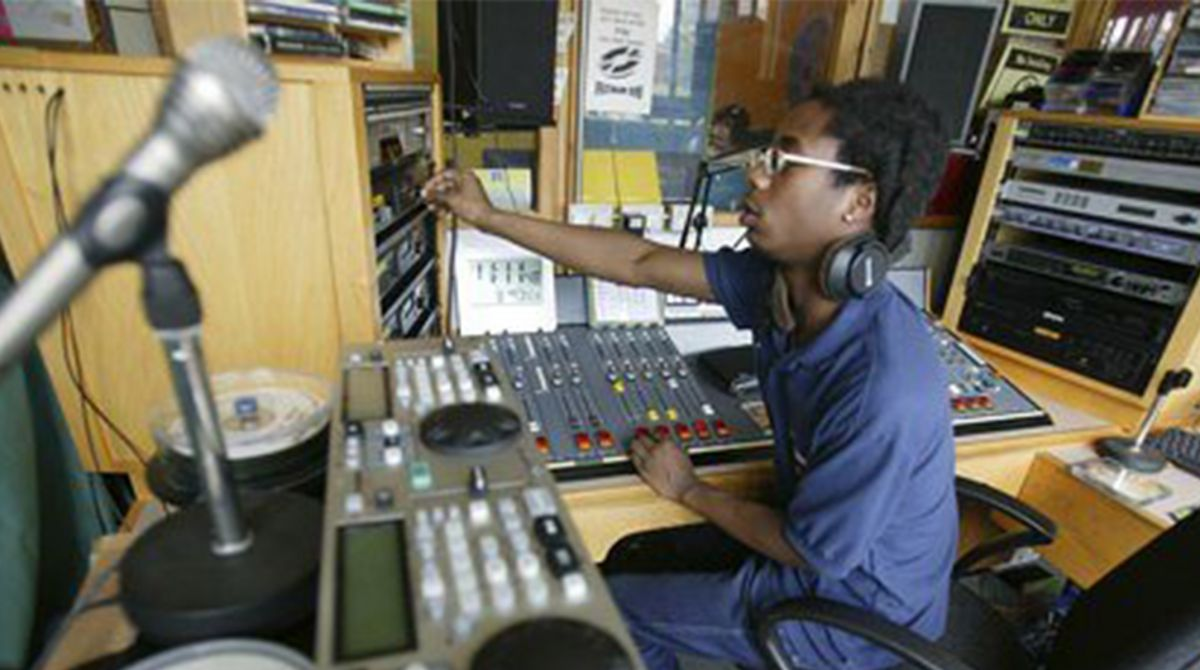
Radio Feltham's studios.

Radio Feltham was the first prison radio station in Europe, operating in HM Prison Feltham, a male juvenile prison and Young Offenders Institution in west London that housed up to 800 boys between the ages of 15 and 21.

It launched in 1994 thanks to the work of advertising executive Mark Robinson, who developed the idea of a radio station to support young prisoners when they were at their most vulnerable, alone in their prison cells at night.

Radio Feltham eventually led to the founding of the award-winning charity the Prison Radio Association, and the development of the world's first national radio station for prisoners, National Prison Radio.

== Origins ==
The idea for a prison radio station was first mooted in 1993 by advertising executive Mark Robinson. It was in response to a spate of suicides, self-harm and violent incidents at HM Prison Feltham.

Robinson approached Feltham prison governor Joseph Whitty and deputy governor Steve Guy-Gibbens to discuss the power radio could have in alleviating the ‘isolation and the boredom of being locked up for 16 hours a day in single cells’ by improving the accessibility of information within the prison. “The radio station will make a real difference to the boys. It will help enrich their lives by giving them a mouthpiece, an involving occupation and the opportunity to practise new skills,” said Robinson in a 1994 interview in Campaign magazine.

With the support of Whitty, Guy-Gibbens and prison officer Bob Clements, Robinson worked with the Home Office and Radio Authority to secure permission to transmit. Funding was not available through the Prison Service due to lack of evidence that the radio station's impact would be positive and measurable, so Robinson sought the expertise of Roma Hooper, an experienced fundraiser.

Local businesses and individuals donated funds, radio and telecoms equipment to facilitate the setup. Charitable trusts were then recruited to fund the development.

A programming framework was developed that supported the prison's key performance targets. This saw volunteer officers support the recruitment of young prisoners, aged between 15 and 21, to organise the programmes and the schedule, enabling them to learn new skills, including communication and interpersonal skills.

The first prison radio show aired on 1 February 1994, using an induction loop system, much like hospital radio, to bring the station to every cell, on frequency 999 kHz, known as Radio Feltham, or Radio Feltz. Radio Feltham broadcast for 10 hours a day, with programmes covering cultural and religious interests, charity information, gym news, football updates, ‘the Agony Aunt’ and music. The radio station became part of the small charity, Friends of Feltham (registered no. 1023442), the only charity running inside a prison at the time, supporting young offenders and their families.

== Development ==
In 1996, with funding from City Bridge Trust and other sponsors, Radio Feltham opened its airwaves to the local community on 87.7FM, for one week, under a Restricted Service Licence. Its popularity led to additional broadcasts of increasing durations, with programmes covering educational and information based topics. BBC Radio 1 became involved with Radio Feltham in 1998, as part of the network's commitment to communicating with extremely disadvantaged and socially excluded young people. Producers and news reporters were sent to Feltham to train the inmates in editing and news reading, building their skills in music and broadcasting.

By 2000, Radio Feltham became the blueprint for new prison radio stations, including Radio Wanno at HMP Wandsworth. It attracted well-known visitors, including musician Pete Townshend, DJ Tim Westwood, who was a Radio Feltham patron, and footballer Tony Adams.

In November 2004, Radio Feltham celebrated its 10-year broadcasting milestone by switching its transmitters from 999AM to 87.8FM. The station, run by young prisoners aged 15 to 21, expanded its usual in-house broadcast to offer a community service of music, news and information to Feltham, to a potential audience of one million residents within a 10-mile radius of HMP Feltham.

Increased interest from prisons across England and Wales in engaging with prison radio led Roma Hooper and Mark Robinson to establish the Prison Radio Association (PRA) in 2006, a charity that offered guidance and expertise to prisons interested in setting up and running their own radio projects.

== General references ==
- Onions, Sarah (20 April 2005). Teaching Radio News. First & Best in Education Ltd. p. 31. ISBN 1860837328.
- Kelso, Paul (23 November 2000). "Boys behind bars". The Guardian. Retrieved 28 September 2016.
- Woffinden, Bob (13 October 2013). "Joe Whitty obituary". The Guardian. Retrieved 28 September 2016.
- "National Prison Radio: Five Years On-Air". Inside Time. 1 May 2014. Retrieved 27 September 2016.
- Muffitt, Eleanor (18 December 2013). "The old debate: punish prisoners, or rehabilitate them?". The Telegraph. Retrieved 27 September 2016.
