= Alejandro Toledo (musician) =

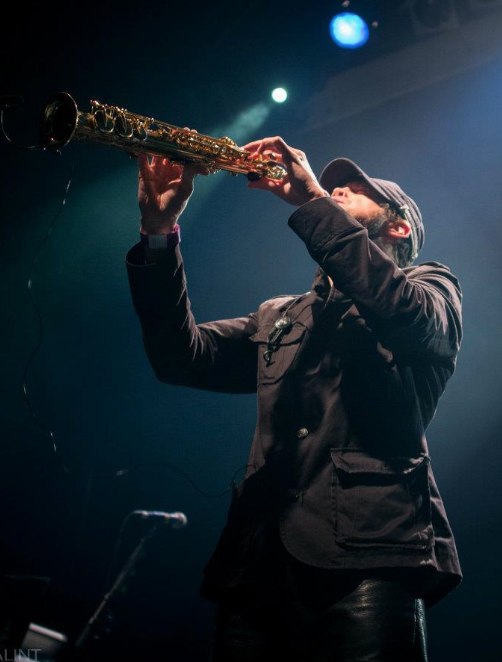

Background information
- Born: Córdoba, Argentina
- Occupations: Saxophonist, Composer
- Years active: 2008–present
- Website: www.alejandrotoledomusic.com

Alejandro Toledo is a composer, saxophonist, and ethnomusicologist. Born in Argentina, he is now based in the United Kingdom. He has received various awards including the Evo Music Rooms award for one of the best upcoming artists in the UK. He has also been featured on various TV shows including The Rob Brydon Show.

== Career ==
Toledo is a classically-trained saxophonist. In 2010, he was selected by Channel 4's Evo Music Rooms as one of the UK's best unsigned artists, and he went on to perform with Faithless and Audio Bullys on a televised programme hosted by Edith Bowman. In 2011, he appeared on the Rob Brydon's BBC2 Christmas special alongside Noel Fielding, Sarah Harding, Rhys Darby, and Angelos Epithemiou. In 2013 he was awarded a PhD degree in music performance from Goldsmiths, University of London for his thesis entitled "World Music, Creative Reinterpretation, and the East Moldavian Roma Tradition"

== Discography ==
=== Studio albums ===
Title	Album details
Full Attack, with Sudden Defences	Released: 4 February 2009; Label: Comparsa; Formats: CD, digital download
1001	Released: 25 December 2016; Label: Framevolution, Comparsa; Formats: Vinyl, CD, digital download

== Television ==
Year	Title	Notes
2010	Evo Music Rooms	Music competition winner
2011	The Rob Brydon Show	House band

== See also ==
- Evo Music Rooms
- The Rob Brydon Show
- List of saxophonists
- List of Argentine musicians
