= Soundtracking =

British podcast

Presentation
- Hosted by: Edith Bowman
- Genre: music and film, Music podcast

Production
- Audio format: AudioBoom, Spotify, Apple Music
- No. of episodes: 309 to date

Publication
- Provider: AudioBoom

Related
- Website: www.edithbowman.com

Soundtracking is a podcast created by its host Edith Bowman, first airing August 5, 2016. The Podcast is a conversation between Edith and a guest on music and film and its unique relationship. Established guests such as directors, actors, musicians, writers, composers, and music supervisors talk about their relationship with music both personally and professionally.

== Background ==
Bowman while as a BBC Radio show host introduced the concept as an occasional programme on BBC 6Music but was never fully supported by the station. Bowman now puts the show together with a friend usually recording in hotel rooms, the guests house or from her own home via video calls. The show since August 2016 has been put out almost biweekly bar a few instances.

== Format ==
The show starts with a small introduction from Bowman explaining the concept of the podcast and introducing the episode's guest. Conversation ranges from the impact of the guest's chosen music on them personally, and on its role in their film or Television programme. The chosen tracks are then played throughout the interview aiding conversation.

== Notable guests ==
Guests have included a variety of actors including Warren Beatty, Bradley Cooper and Ewan McGregor. Film directors Quentin Tarantino, Ron Howard, Peter Jackson, Guy Ritchie, Greta Gerwig. Composers and Musicians that have been featured on the show include Isobel Waller-Bridge, Justin Hurwitz and Biffy Clyro. As well as a range of professionals working behind the scenes such as Music supervisor Sarah Bridge.

== Awards ==
In 2019 at the Radio Academy Awards, Edith Bowmans Soundtracking was awarded 'Bronze' in the Best Music Presenter for Soundtracking category, second year running. Bowman won 'Gold' in the Best Specialist Music Show category in 2018, the show taking 'Bronze' in 2017.

At the 2020 New York Festivals Radio Awards, Soundtracking won Gold for Best Music Programme Host, winning Bronze in 2019. Winning another two Golds in Best Digital Music Programme and Best Music podcast back in 2018.

At the 2020 Audio and Radio Industry Awards, Bowman won bronze for "Best Music Presenter, supported by PPL and PRS for Music" and was nominated for "Best Specialist Music Show, supported by Big Star Business Management".

Bowman has been nominated four times at the British Podcast Awards 2017 and 2018, winning the Bronze prize in 2017 for two categories: Entertainment and Best Review.

Soundtracking was awarded the Honouree position at the 2019 and 2018 Webby Awards in the Podcasts: Television & Film, and Interview/Talk Show categories

== See also ==
- Music podcast
