= Evo Music Rooms =

UK music competition and showcase

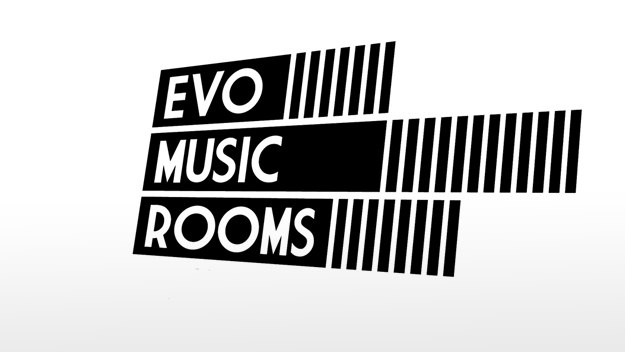
- Date: 2010
- Location: United Kingdom
- Type: Music Competition

Evo Music Rooms was a music competition and showcase in the United Kingdom that featured established and up-and-coming artists. The competition was sponsored by Fiat, and aired in 2010 on Channel 4. The show was hosted by Edith Bowman.

== History ==
Evo Music Rooms was hosted by Edith Bowman, and aired on Channel 4 in 2010. The competition sought to showcase the best unsigned bands and solo musicians in the UK. Three winners were chosen from over 2000 applicants. The competition winners included Viktoria Modesta, Alejandro Toledo (musician) and the Magic Tombolinos, I Am Austin (Welsh two piece dance/rockers) and Shadez the Misfit. The television series aired in 7 episodes on Channel 4. Each episode featured a different established artist, which included Doves, The Specials, Graham Coxon, Faithless, Biffy Clyro, Caribou, and Plan B.
