= The Rob Brydon Show =

- Genre: Comedy; Entertainment
- Directed by: Steve Smith
- Presented by: Rob Brydon
- Country of origin: United Kingdom
- Original language: English
- No. of series: 3
- No. of episodes: 21

Production
- Producers: Andy Price; James Longman
- Production locations: Teddington Studios; BBC Television Centre
- Editors: Graham Barker; David Morley
- Running time: 30 minutes

Original release
- Network: BBC Two
- Release: 17 September 2010 – 18 September 2012

The Rob Brydon Show is a British chat show hosted by comedian Rob Brydon. The first series started on 17 September 2010 and consists of six regular episodes, a compilation episode and a Christmas special. The second series had six regular episodes, a Christmas special and a compilation episode. The third and final series had six regular episodes.

== Format ==
Each week, Brydon asks his Twitter followers to provide questions for his guests, which he asks after the comedian segment. Brydon interviews two guests, who sit on his sofa while they chat; the musical guest performs at the end of the show (as well as possibly singing with Brydon during their segment). A comedian performs a short stint, with a short interview afterwards by Brydon.

The compilation episodes consist of previously unseen material. The first series compilation was set in the future, hosted by Brydon. The second series clips were hosted by Dai Young, a performer/publican from Wales and Brydon's alleged former comedy partner (in reality Brydon himself in costume).

== Episode list ==
=== Series 1 ===
Episode	Broadcast date	Guest	Singer(s)	Comedian(s)
1	17 September 2010	David Walliams	Sir Tom Jones	Tom Deacon
2	24 September 2010	James Corden	Mark Ronson	Carly Smallman
3	1 October 2010	Stephen Fry	Seasick Steve	Daniel Sloss
4	8 October 2010	Sir Terry Wogan	Sharleen Spiteri	Hal Cruttenden
5	15 October 2010	Ronnie Corbett	Paloma Faith	Lucy Porter
6	22 October 2010	Compilation show "set in the future"		
7	30 December 2010	Alice Cooper	Jeremy Lion; Bryn Terfel	Jo Brand; Jack Dee

=== Series 2 ===
Episode	Broadcast date	Guest(s)	Singer(s)	Comedian
1	22 July 2011	Matt Lucas	The Script	Nina Conti
2	29 July 2011	Bill Bailey	Beverley Knight	Celia Pacquola
3	5 August 2011	Sir Bruce Forsyth	Sophie Ellis-Bextor	Elis James
4	12 August 2011	Chris O'Dowd	The Faces	Josh Widdicombe
5	19 August 2011	Dame Edna Everage	Will Young	Phil Wang
6	26 August 2011	Frank Skinner	Hurts	Joe Wilkinson
7	2 September 2011	Compilation show with Dai Young		
8 (Note: Christmas Special)	19 December 2011	Rhys Darby; Noel Fielding; Sarah Harding; Renton Skinner	Alejandro Toledo and the Magic Tombolinos	Charlie Baker

=== Series 3 ===
Episode	Broadcast date	Guest(s)	Singer(s)
1	14 August 2012	Alex James; Michael McIntyre	Amy Macdonald
2	21 August 2012	Heston Blumenthal; Barbara Windsor	The Overtones
3	28 August 2012	Grayson Perry; Sarah Millican	Newton Faulkner
4	4 September 2012	Jason Manford; Neil Morrissey	Ronan Keating
5	11 September 2012	Steve Backshall; Emilia Fox	Sir Tom Jones
6	18 September 2012	Brian Cox; Ray Winstone	Kelly Jones
