= Life Cinematic =

- Genre: Biographical interview
- Directed by: Sam Anthony
- Presented by: Edith Bowman; Robbie Collin
- Country of origin: United Kingdom
- Original language: English
- No. of seasons: 1
- No. of episodes: 5

Production
- Executive producer: Jez Nelson
- Producer: Ian Sharpe
- Running time: 60 minutes
- Production company: Somethin’ Else

Original release
- Network: BBC Four
- Release: 30 January 2020 – 4 March 2021

Life Cinematic is a BBC television series of in-depth interviews with notable filmmakers, with clips from movies that have influenced them. With The Film Review and associated programs, Life Cinematic fills the gap left by the cancellation of the BBCs long-running Film... series in 2018. It is produced by Somethin’ Else and presented either by Edith Bowman or Robbie Collin, who give a brief résumé of the interviewee's career before conducting the interview. In the first 60-minute episode, broadcast 30 January 2020, Bowman spoke with Sir Sam Mendes, the British director whose blockbuster film 1917 was released three weeks previously.

== Episodes ==
No.	Interviewee	Presenter	First broadcast
1	Sam Mendes	Edith Bowman	30 January 2020
2	Edgar Wright	Robbie Collin	6 February 2020
3	Sam Taylor-Johnson	Edith Bowman	13 February 2020
4	Sofia Coppola	Edith Bowman	25 November 2020
5	Amma Asante	Edith Bowman	4 March 2021

Source: BBC Life Cinematic Episode Guide. Last updated 25 March 2021.
