= Nadia Jae =

British radio presenter

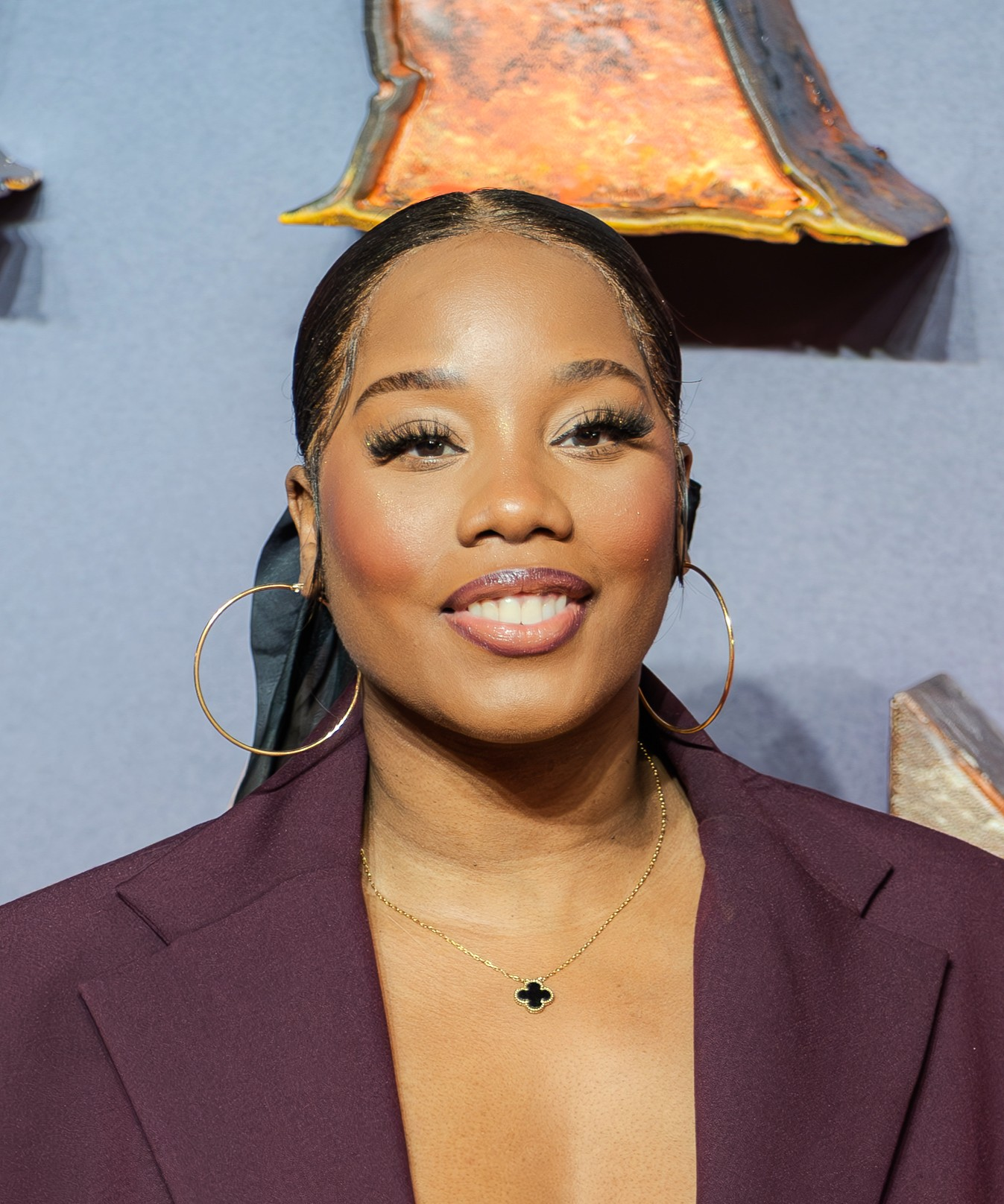
Nadia Jae in 2025

Nadia Jae (born 1 June 1986) is a British radio presenter and DJ, best known for hosting BBC Radio 1Xtra's flagship breakfast show since 2020.

== Life and career ==
Nadia Jae first appeared on 1Xtra in October 2018 as part of the station's "Residency" DJs, specialising in R&B music for over a monthly rotation. In May 2019, Jae took over the Sunday afternoon show before moving to the Weekend Breakfast show on 12 October 2019.

In July 2020, following the departure of Dotty, Jae began presenting the weekday breakfast show on a temporary basis, before being announced as the permanent presenter on 17 December 2020.

Jae was born and raised in South London, where she lives with her son named Ky.
