= On the Beach (business) =

UK travel agency

- Type: Public
- Traded as: LSE: OTB
- Industry: Travel
- Founded: 2004; 22 years ago
- Founder: Simon Cooper
- Headquarters: Manchester, United Kingdom
- Area served: United Kingdom
- Key people: Richard Pennycook (chairman); Shaun Morton (CEO)
- Products: Holidays; Flights; Hotels
- Services: Travel Agency
- Revenue: ▲£121.4 million (2025)
- Operating income: ▲£22.9 million (2025)
- Net income: ▼£8.6 million (2025)
- Website: www.onthebeach.co.uk

On the Beach Group is a UK-based travel retailer specialising in short and medium haul ‘Flight and Hotel’ package holidays to Europe. The company is listed on the London Stock Exchange.

== History ==
The company was founded by Simon Cooper, who began his career in the travel industry while attending university, when he founded a ski holiday company called On the Piste. He geared the business toward groups of students wanting to go on budget-friendly ski holidays to the French Alps by coach. Meanwhile, in 2004, Cooper started working on a new venture, On the Beach. When TUI Group's Thomson Holidays (since renamed TUI UK) purchased On the Piste in 2008, Cooper then directed his full attention to his new platform.

In 2007, private equity investor Livingbridge acquired a majority stake in the company for £36 million.

In 2008, the company relocated to larger premises at Spectrum House on Towers Business Park in Didsbury, Manchester to house additional employees.

In 2011 On the Beach expanded further by acquiring Resort Taxis out of administration for £10,000 to assist with transporting holidaymakers in its most popular destinations of Egypt, Turkey, The Balearics, The Canaries, mainland Spain, Greece and The Algarve. The Resort Taxi arm was later re-branded into On the Beach Transfers in 2012. The company also continued to build on its services by founding On the Beach Beds in 2011. The self-contracted hotel organisation allowed On the Beach to contract directly with hotels, attempting to secure better rates for their customers and increase their market advantage.

In January 2012, On the Beach launched its 24-hour resort support service, providing customers with points of contact within their resorts at some of their most popular destinations. By the end of 2012, On the Beach had relocated its headquarters to a new 17’500 square foot property in Cheadle, near Stockport.

In October 2013, Livingbridge sold a majority stake in the business to Inflexion Equity Partners on the basis of an enterprise value of £73 million.

In January 2015, On the Beach expanded internationally by launching in Sweden under the domain name ebeach.se. In September 2015, On the Beach was floated on the London Stock Exchange, valued at £240 million.

In May 2017, On the Beach acquired rival online travel agent Sunshine.co.uk for a total cost of £12 million.

In November 2018, On the Beach opened its brand new digital headquarters at the Aeroworks building in Ancoats, Manchester.

== Operations ==
On the Beach is headquartered in the Aeroworks building, Ancoats, Manchester. On 26 December 2013, On the Beach aired their first television advert. The ‘Totally Beachin Holidays’ campaign, was filmed in Corralejo, Fuerteventura and was broadcast across the Midlands region on ITV and Channel 4.
