= Manveen Rana =

British journalist

Manveen Rana (born 25 July 1980) is a senior broadcast journalist who has hosted the Times Radio podcast Stories of our times, now called The Story since March 2020. She formerly worked for the BBC as a reporter for the Today programme.

She was born in London to a Sikh family of Indian origin. She studied Politics and Economics at Durham University, and was President of the Durham Union during Epiphany term of 2001.

Rana worked at The Sunday Telegraph and The Daily Telegraph (2001–03); as a researcher at BBC Radio 4 (2003–05); and a journalist at the same station from 2005, during which she worked on various news programmes, including The World at One. She was part of the team that exposed links between the controversial PR firm Bell Pottinger and the Gupta family in South Africa, and joined Today in 2018.

Rana hosts a daily podcast as part of the launch of Times Radio, a talk radio venture of The Times newspaper.
