= Bro Radio =

Radio station in Barry

Coordinates: 53.3235°N 3.4887°W

- Barry, Vale of Glamorgan; Wales
- Broadcast area: Barry and surrounding areas
- Frequencies: FM: 98.1 MHz; 98.4 MHz; 100.2 MHZ; 106.1 MHz; Online

Programming
- Languages: English, Welsh
- Format: Adult Contemporary

Ownership
- Owner: Vale of Glamorgan Broadcasting CIC

History
- First air date: 31 March 2009

Links
- Website: Bro Radio

Bro Radio is a community radio station broadcasting to Barry, Llantwit Major, Penarth and surrounding areas in the Vale of Glamorgan (Welsh: Bro Morgannwg), South Wales.

The station is owned and operated by Vale of Glamorgan Broadcasting, a community interest company (CIC) and broadcasts from studios at the YMCA Hub in Barry.

Bro Radio broadcasts on 98.1 FM in Barry and the central Vale, on 98.4 FM in the St Athan and Rhoose areas, on 100.2 FM in Llantwit Major and western parts of the Vale, and on 106.1 FM in Penarth and the surrounding area, as well as on DAB+ in the eastern Vale of Glamorgan, Cardiff and Caerphilly.

== Overview ==
Apart from national news bulletins, all of the station's output is produced and presented locally by a team of over 75 volunteers, a paid operations director and a sales & finance manager.

In August 2020, plans were announced to broadcast in Penarth and the Eastern Vale of Glamorgan.

In December 2020, Bro Radio was named Station of the Year at the annual Community Radio Awards.

The following year, the station began broadcasting on 106.1 FM to Penarth and the Eastern Vale, along with another relay on 98.4 FM for the St Athan and Rhoose areas.

On 26 June 2023, Bro Radio began broadcasting on DAB+ in Cardiff, Caerphilly and the Eastern Vale of Glamorgan via the Cardiff DAB small-scale multiplex.

In August 2024, the station launched its own training and development arm. The Bro Radio Academy provides opportunities to young people and adults across the Vale of Glamorgan.

== Programming ==
Bro Radio's schedule consists of locally produced programming including music-led daytime output, local news and sport, current affairs and features, events coverage, and specialist programming during the evenings and at weekends.

Presenter led core weekday hours are 6.30am-12am and on weekends, 7am-12am.

=== News and current affairs ===
Bro Radio's newsroom produces and broadcasts local news bulletins on the half hour from 1.30pm to 6.30pm on weekdays, with local headlines on the hour during Vale Drive.

At weekends, local news bulletins also air on the hour between 10am and 1pm on Saturdays.

Bro Radio also produces a weekly current affairs programme, The Vale This Week, along with a sports show on Monday evenings and an online local news service.

The station also airs hourly national bulletins from Sky News Radio 24 hours a day, accompanied by hourly local bulletins on Saturdays and Sundays from 10am to 1pm.
