= Adrian Durham =

English broadcaster and journalist

- Born: Adrian Durham; 13 May 1969 (age 56); Peterborough, Cambridgeshire, England
- Occupations: Broadcaster; journalist
- Years active: 1990s–present
- Notable work: Talksport

Adrian Durham (born 13 May 1969) is an English football journalist and broadcaster.

== Early life ==
Durham was born in Peterborough and was educated at Dogsthorpe School.

== Career ==
Durham began his broadcasting career in Leeds in the early 1990s working on the TEAMtalk telephone service, alongside reporters such as BBC Radio 5 Live commentator Ian Dennis, which was established as an independent rival to Clubcall.

Durham joined Talksport in 1999. He hosted the station's "Drive" programme on weekdays between 4pm and 7pm for 16 years. His co-hosts included footballer Ian Wright and cricketer Darren Gough. In July 2022, Durham left the Drivetime show. He still hosts Talksport's live football coverage.

In 2010, Durham styled himself as the world's only celebrity Peterborough United fan. He was described in The Guardian as an "expert phone-in troll, arrogantly spouting inflammatory football opinions in the hope of prompting some indignant phone rage from an uppity fan." He once accused Jamie Carragher of being a "bottler" for retiring from international football, which prompted the Liverpool and England defender to call in to the show to confront Durham. His criticism of Celtic manager Neil Lennon prompted a phone call from Celtic fan Rod Stewart, who gave Durham a "gentle lashing".

Preceded by None	Talksport breakfast show host 2000	Succeeded by Alan Brazil
