= Vectis Radio =

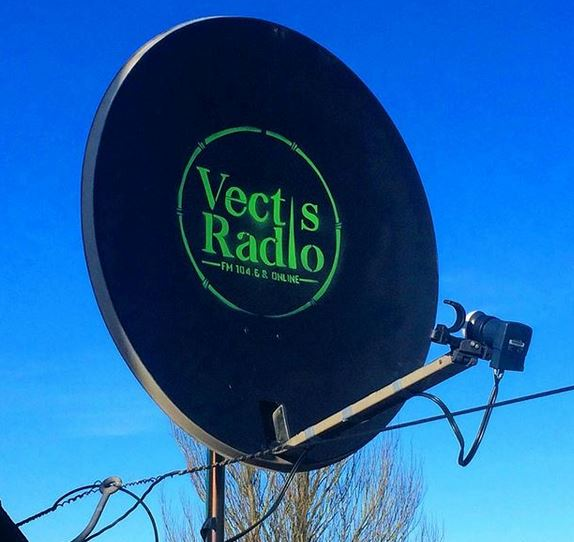
- Newport; England
- Broadcast area: Isle of Wight
- Frequencies: 104.6 FM, DAB 9A

Programming
- Format: Community radio

Ownership
- Owner: Vectis Radio CIC

History
- First air date: 23 January 2010 (online); 4 November 2017 (FM)

Vectis Radio is a community radio station in Newport on the Isle of Wight. The station launched as an online-only station on 23 January 2010 and began broadcasting on FM on 4 November 2017. Vectis Radio transmits on FM from Newport Golf Club.

== History ==
Vectis Radio was founded in 2010 when Ian Mac created a studio for broadcast from The Quay Arts Centre in Newport. Described as a "broom cupboard", the team of presenters, less than ten in number, then moved to locations such as St Georges Park and studios in Crocker Street and West Street, Newport respectively. They moved into their current home at The Riverside Centre in Newport in 2013. The station's slogan fits inline with their community outreach, as a station 'for the people, by the people'. In 2017, Vectis Radio became a Community Interest Company.

== FM launch ==
The station applied in October 2015 to Ofcom after the regulators welcomed bids for FM broadcasting by community radio stations in the South of the United Kingdom. The license was granted in June 2016. A crowdfunding period then began to fund Vectis Radio's aim to go to FM broadcasting - launched on air by Manager Ian Mac. Enough funding was secured by this process and by other means to begin the work. In the meantime marketing drive began to promote the Vectis Radio name in time for the FM launch.

The station began broadcasting on FM 104.6 on 4 November 2017. The launch took place at their studio in The Riverside Centre, Newport. 4Ps student and presenter Hannah Barker was selected to press the button that commenced transmissions.

== Digital radio ==
A consortium headed by Vectis Radio and Isle of Wight Radio parent Total Sense Media was successful in securing a broadcast licence from Ofcom to operate a superlocal smallscale DAB multiplex for the Isle of Wight. The multiplex will go on air on 18 April 2026 carrying Vectis Radio alongside other services focused on the island, and some operating over a wider area such as Outreach Radio.

== The 4Ps Project ==
In 2012 the station launched a teaching program called The 4Ps Project for people aged 11 – 19 (and up to 25 with additional needs).

The project covers four ingredients the station deems required for radio broadcasting: Presenting, Producing, Podcasting and Promoting. The aim of the scheme is to give people the opportunity to broadcast on a local radio station, and to give members and students a chance to put a skill on their CV.

In 2018, Vectis Radio won a bronze award at the Community Radio Awards for the project in the Community Development Project of the Year category. The station also picked up a Highly Commended award in the Business in the Community category at the 2019 Isle of Wight Chamber Of Commerce awards. The station gained another Bronze for its 4Ps project and a Silver Sage award in the Community Radio Awards in October 2019. In 2021, the station won two gold prizes: for Community Development Project of the Year and the Sage Award for Kelvin Currie.
