= National Prison Radio =

UK radio station for prisoners

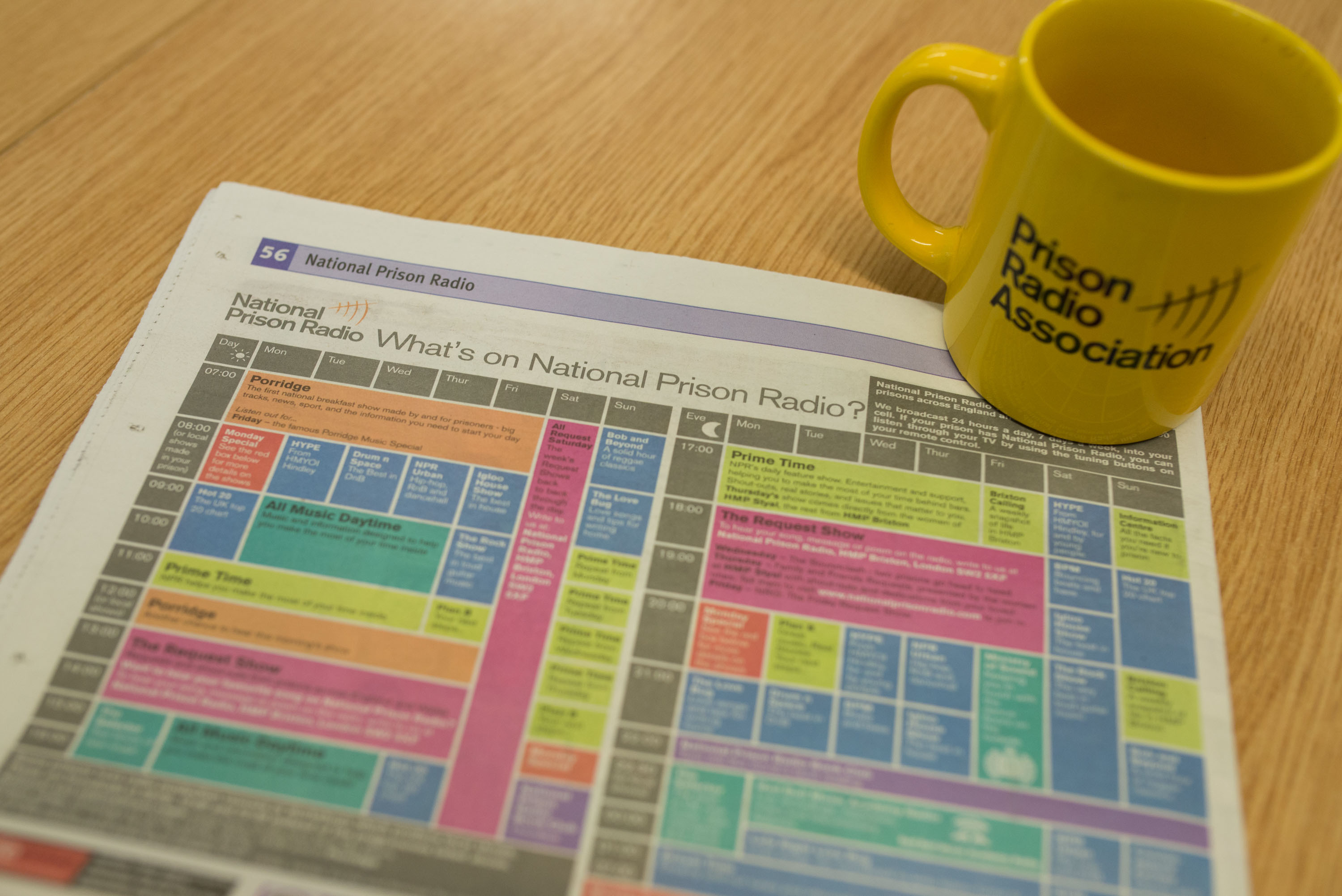
National Prison Radio broadcast schedule

National Prison Radio is the world's first national radio station for prisoners launched in 2009. It is run by the Prison Radio Association, a charity, in partnership with His Majesty's Prison Service and the National Offender Management Service. It broadcasts 24/7 to prisoners in over 100 establishments across England and Wales. Prisoners receive the service as an audio channel via in-cell TV systems. It is available to over 80,000 prisoners.

It aims to reduce re-offending by engaging prisoners in education and discussion, helping people in custody to develop strategies for dealing with the issues that led them to prison. The station's programmes are presented and produced by serving prisoners working alongside the Prison Radio Association's staff of professional radio producers. Content supports National Offender Management Service's objective to reduce re-offending by providing information vital for progressing successfully through a prison sentence. It promotes educational opportunities, discussion of issues related to crime and justice, as well as messages and requests from prisoners' families and friends.

National Prison Radio aims to help prisoners face up to the effects their actions have had on themselves, their families, victims and society as a whole, encouraging them to see prison as a place of positive change.

== Origins ==
The idea for a prison radio station was first mooted in 1993 by advertising executive Mark Robinson. It was in response to a spate of suicides, self-harm and violent incidents at HM Prison Feltham.

With support from prison governor Joseph Whitty and deputy governor Steve Guy-Gibbens, as well as prison officer Bob Clements and fundraiser Roma Hooper OBE, Robinson launched Radio Feltham on 1 February 1994, broadcasting into every cell in the prison.

Radio Feltham's success led to interest from other prisons across England and Wales to engage with prison radio. To address the need for expertise in the development of prison radio, Roma Hooper and Mark Robinson established the Prison Radio Association in 2006, as a charity that offers guidance and expertise to prisons interested in setting up and running their own radio projects.

The Prison Radio Association launched a radio station in HMP Brixton, called Electric Radio Brixton, in November 2007. The first programme was presented by serving prisoners alongside BBC Radio 1's Bobby Friction. Studio guests included Billy Bragg and Mick Jones. The programme was broadcast in front of a live audience, including the future chief executive of the National Offender Management Service, Michael Spurr.

Electric Radio Brixton was run by station manager Andrew Wilkie, who worked with serving prisoners to produce radio programmes which were broadcast directly into the cells of 800 prisoners.

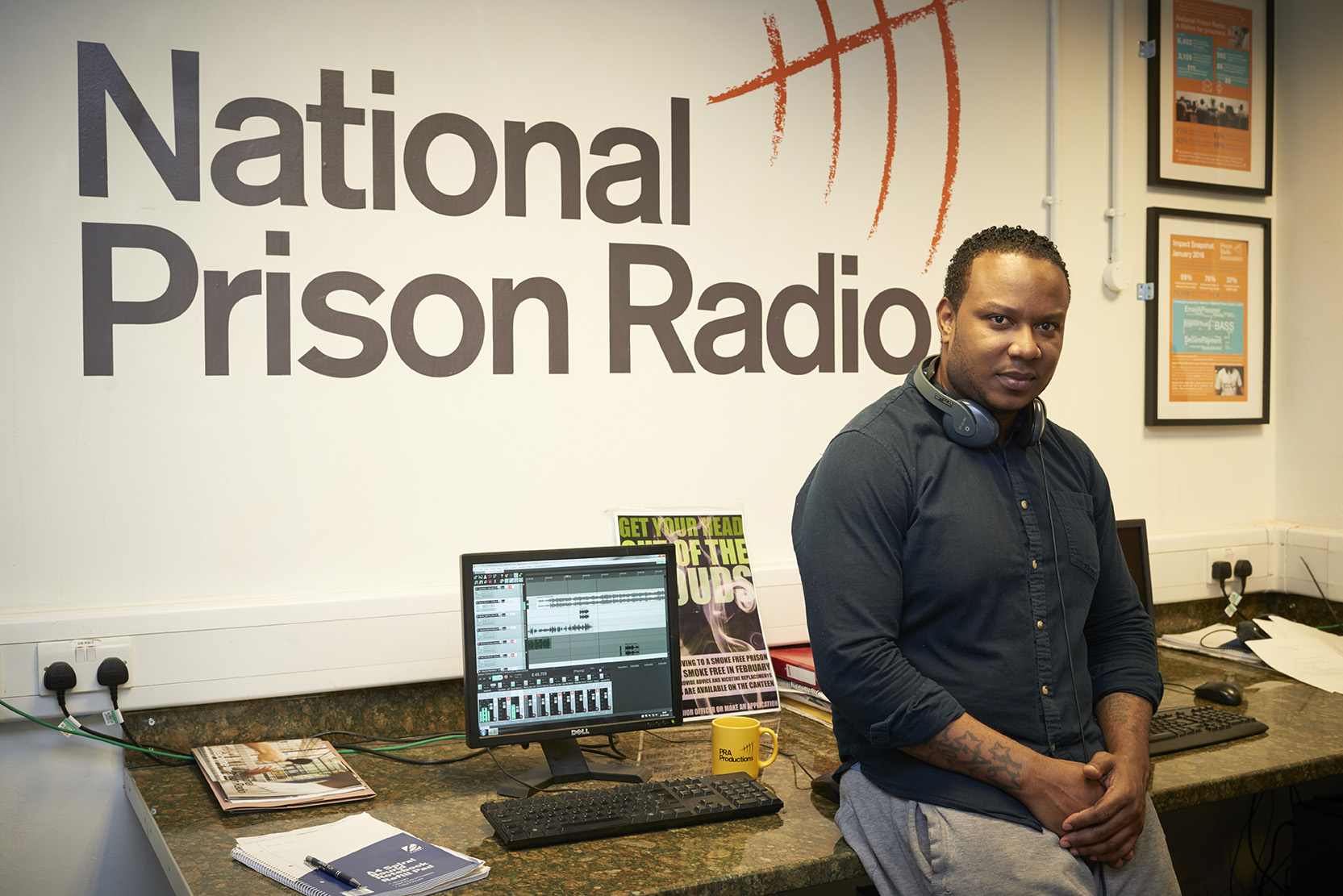
The National Prison Radio production suite inside HM Prison Brixton

Within 18 months of its launch, Electric Radio Brixton won four Sony Radio Academy Awards.

Following a visit to meet the team behind Electric Radio Brixton, Guardian columnist Zoe Williams said "This station sets a new standard not just for community radio, or charity radio, or cheap radio, but for all radio."

In 2009 Electric Radio Brixton re-launched to become National Prison Radio, as we know it now.

== Content ==
National Prison Radio is a linear service broadcasting 24/7 into prison cells.

The station broadcasts a mixture of speech and music content, all designed to support prisoners through their sentences, helping them to make appropriate use of the rehabilitation services available to them while they are in prison and preparing them to live crime-free lives after release.

Programming closely reflects National Offender Management Service's Seven Pathways to Reducing Reoffending. The emphasis lies on helping prisoners to take responsibility for their own lives and the lives of those around them, as well as providing information about support services available in prison.

Programmes are produced by prisoners working alongside the charity's staff team of professional radio producers. The bulk of programming is produced in Styal and Brixton prisons, but in 2015, Prison Radio Association staff began running pop-up radio production workshops in other prisons across the estate. Content generated from these workshops are broadcast on 'National Prison Radio Takeover Days'. The project more than doubled the number of prisoners contributing to on-air programmes in a year, up from 475 prisoners in 2014 to 992 in 2015.

Each hour, National Prison Radio broadcasts a news bulletin from the studios of Independent Radio News.

The station also produces its own daily Prison News bulletin – a short summary of news and information likely to be of interest to prisoners. The Prison News bulletins include information published by Her Majesty's Chief Inspector of Prisons, updates on changes to prison and justice policy, and reports on activities taking place in prisons across the country and beyond.

Other key programmes featured on National Prison Radio include:

- Porridge – a daily breakfast show which is designed to put listeners into a positive frame of mind in preparation for the day;
- NPR Talk – a daily speech strand which includes in-depth features and interviews designed to inspire and inform listeners, engaging the audience in the debates that surround criminal justice and celebrating the achievements of people who have successfully turned their backs on patterns of behaviour that may have led them to prison;
- The Request Show – a daily two-hour request show designed to build National Prison Radio's audience and keep people in prison in touch with family and loved-ones on the outside;
- Straightline – a weekly dance music-based request show. This is the only programme on the station that's available to the general public, hosted on Mixcloud and featuring requests from prisoners to their family and loved-ones on the outside;
- Freedom Inside – a weekly yoga programme produced in partnership with The Prison Phoenix Trust which offers structured meditation and yoga sessions via the radio;
- Outside In – a monthly programme produced by volunteers from the BBC and presented by former prisoners, which aims to prepare prisoners for life after prison;
- Books Unlocked – a nightly audiobook serialization produced in partnership with the National Literacy Trust
- YO Takeover – a monthly programme produced by prisoners at HM Prison Isis, aimed at young adults in prison;
- Open Road – a monthly magazine programme targeted at Gypsy, Traveller and Roma prisoners;
- The Love Bug – a weekly music programme which is designed to encourage people in prison to write letters to their loved ones on the outside;
- Dream Time – broadcasting speech and music which aims to reassure and orientate people in prison during the hours of darkness, when prisoners are at their most vulnerable to self-harm and suicide. This programme broadcasts through the night, every night.

In 2015, the Prison Radio Association teamed up with BBC Drama North to produce a radio drama called Bound for broadcast on National Prison Radio. It was recorded in the BBC's drama studios and on location at HMP Styal. It told the story of a young pregnant prisoner fighting to keep her baby with her inside prison. The cast included serving prisoners and professional actors, including Sally Carman, John Henshaw and Matthew McNulty. Bound was broadcast by BBC Radio 4 in January 2017.

In 2016 National Prison Radio broadcast a live event called 'Letters From The Inside', in which performers including Olivia Colman, Benedict Cumberbatch, Kae Tempest, Russell Brand, Matt Berry, Clarke Peters and Mark Strong, as well as serving and former prisoners, read out remarkable letters, including some from prisoners, before a live audience in the chapel of HMP Brixton. The event was run in partnership with Letters Live to mark the tenth anniversary of the Prison Radio Association.

== Audience ==
The Prison Radio Association runs regular audience surveys, developed in partnership with the BBC and RAJAR, the official radio audience measurement body in the UK. A significant proportion of NPR's audience is surveyed regularly throughout the year to gather data on the impact of individual campaigns and overall audience levels.

In 2016, surveys showed that 99% of prisoners were aware of National Prison Radio, and 76% of prisoners listen regularly. The average listener tunes in for 10.4 hours each week. When asked what they thought of the radio station:

- 75% said they had been inspired by something they'd heard on National Prison Radio;
- 85% said it had helped them to think about making positive changes to their lives;
- 77% said they trust what they hear on National Prison Radio;
- 63% said National Prison Radio provides information they can't get anywhere else;
- 83% said National Prison Radio had made them aware of support available to them in prison;
- 49% had taken action after hearing something on National Prison Radio.

A key measure of impact for National Prison Radio is the number of letters the station receives from its audience and their loved ones. In 2015, more than 6,400 letters were sent to National Prison Radio by prisoners and more than 3,100 song requests and messages of support were sent in by prisoners' friends and families.

== Awards ==
Year	Organisation	Award	Work	Result
2008	Charity Times Awards	Best New Charity	National Prison Radio	Won
2009	Sony Radio Academy Awards	The Community Award	A Sound Fix by Electric Radio Brixton	Won
2009	Sony Radio Academy Awards	The Listener Participation Award	Daily Show by Electric Radio Brixton	Won
2009	IVCA Clarion Awards	Radio Station	National Prison Radio	Won
2010	Jerusalem Awards	Good Friday	National Prison Radio	Won
2011	Sony Radio Academy Awards	Best Community Programming	The Brixton Hour	Silver
2011	Sandford St Martin Trust	Radio	National Prison Radio	Merit
2012	Radio Academy Nations & Regions Awards	Station of the Year: London	National Prison Radio	Won
2012	Sony Radio Academy Awards	Best Community Programming	Porridge	Nominated
2012	Sony Radio Academy Awards	Best Community Programming	Face to Face	Gold
2012	Sony Radio Academy Awards	Breakfast Show of the Year	Behind Bars	Bronze
2012	Third Sector Excellence Awards	Charity Partnership	Prison Radio Association and Victim Support	Won
2013	Longford Prize	Main Prize	Prison Radio Association	Won
2013	Radio Academy Nations & Regions Awards	Station of the Year: London	National Prison Radio	Won
2013	Radio Academy Awards	Best Community Programming	Make a Clean Break	Nominated
2013	IVCA Clarion Awards	Radio Station	National Prison Radio	Silver
2013	IVCA Clarion Awards	Radio Station	HMP Wandsworth's Radio Wanno	Bronze
2014	Third Sector Excellence Awards	Enterprise Award	Prison Radio Association	Won
2014	Radio Production Awards	Indie of the Year	Prison Radio Association	Silver
2015	Radio Production Awards	Indie of the Year	Prison Radio Association	Bronze
2016	New York Festivals International Radio Program Awards	Social Issues	Prison Radio Association	Gold
2016	New York Festivals International Radio Program Awards	Biography/Profile	Prison Radio Association	Bronze
2016	Rose d'Or	Audio Stories	National Prison Radio	Won
2016	Audio Production Awards	Grassroots Category	National Prison Radio	Won
2016	Audio Production Awards	Indie of the Year	National Prison Radio	Bronze
2016	Third Sector Excellence Awards	Charity of the Year	Prison Radio Association	Won
2017	Third Sector Excellence Awards	Chief Executive of the Year	National Prison Radio	Nominated
2017	New York Festivals International Radio Program Awards	Information	National Prison Radio	Silver
2017	New York Festivals International Radio Program Awards	Documentary	National Prison Radio	Silver
2017	D&AD Impact Awards	Promise Award	Straightline	Won
2017	Audio Production Awards	Grassroots	Prison Radio Association	Nominated
2018	Audio & Radio Industry Awards (ARIAS)	Best Fictional Storytelling	Double Bubble	Gold
2018	Audio & Radio Industry Awards (ARIAS)	Best Podcast	Prison Radio Association Productions	Bronze
2019	British Podcast Awards	Best Fiction Podcast	Double Bubble	Nominated
2019	British Podcast Awards	Best Interview Podcast	Sex Talk	Bronze
2019	British Podcast Awards	Best New Podcast	On the Road	Bronze
2019	British Podcast Awards	Smartest Podcast	On the Road	Nominated
2021	Audio & Radio Industry Awards (ARIAS)	Best New Presenter	Josie Bevan on Prison Bag	Nominated
2021	Audio & Radio Industry Awards (ARIAS)	Best Music Entertainment Show	Free Flow	Bronze
2021	Audio & Radio Industry Awards (ARIAS)	Creative Innovation Award	Prison Bag	Bronze
2021	British Podcast Awards	Best Interview Podcast	Future Prison	Nominated
2021	British Podcast Awards	Smartest Podcast	The Secret Life of Prisons	Nominated
2021	British Podcast Awards	Smartest Podcast	Windrush Stories	Nominated
