= BBC Radio Drama =

Richard II, a 1947 radio production with George Ralph, Alec Guinness, Nicholas Hannen, Margaret Leighton, Ralph Richardson and Harry Andrews. Broadcast on the BBC Third Programme 11/5/1947

BBC Radio Drama is a London-based group within the BBC Radio operational business division of the BBC. BBC Radio Drama oversees the production and broadcast of radio dramas aired on the BBC Radio network. Radio dramas had been broadcast even before the public service company had an officially established radio broadcasting network in the United Kingdom. Thus, the work of the BBC Radio Drama group also pre-dates the 1967 conversion of BBC Radio from a single national station into four separate, specialized national stations; since 1967, the BBC radio dramas are broadcast on BBC Radio 3 and BBC Radio 4.

== History of BBC Radio Drama ==
BBC Radio Drama has a long history.

The earliest radio drama surviving in the BBC Sound Archives is "The Purple Pileus" by H.G. Wells, with Philip Wade, Ann Trevor, Harold Scott, Myrtle Richardson, Douglas Burbridge, Peter Ridgeway, Edward Craven, Lilian Warde. It was broadcast 6/8/1935; it is 37:04 in duration and the BBC identifier is T13646.

Also from 1935, there is "Reconnaissance" by Geoffrey Askew and E.J. King-Bull with Holland Bennett, Robert Speaight, Ivor Barnard, broadcast 24/12/1935 on the Regional(N & LR) Service; it is 27:24 in duration, and the BBC identifier MT13855.

Earlier extracts & trailers exist in the BBC Sound Archives. For example, trailers recorded in October 1932 & broadcast in 1933 - 4:30 of Tyrone Guthrie's "The Flowers are Not For You to Pick"; 4:20 of P.H. Lennox's "Matinee"; 2:55 of L. du Garde Peach's "The Path of Glory" - all part of the series "Twelve Plays for Broadcasting" and produced by Lance Sieveking. There is also a 3:36 trailer for "Trent's Last Case" adapted from the novel by E.C. Bentley from 14/12/1933.

== Heads of BBC Radio Drama ==
The following is a (partial) list of BBC drama heads and the dates they started as head.

- R E Jeffrey, 1924
- Val Gielgud, 1929
- Martin Esslin, 1963
- Ronald Mason, 1976
- John Tydeman, 1986
- Caroline Raphael, 1994
- Kate Rowland, 1997
- Gordon House, 2001
- Alison Hindell, 2005
- Sue Roberts

== Third Programme drama ==
The Third Programme was launched on 29 September 1946 as part of the post war re-organisation of BBC radio. An early radio production of Shakespeare's Richard II was broadcast in 1947 starring members of the Old Vic Theatre Company including Alec Guinness (King Richard), Margaret Leighton (Queen), Ralph Richardson (John of Gaunt) and Harry Andrews (Henry Bolingbroke).
