= Shannon Trust =

UK charity promoting literacy in prisons

The Shannon Trust provides adults who have had negative early life educational experiences with a second chance at learning to read and obtain numeracy skills.

== Founding ==
The Shannon Trust was founded in 1997 by Christopher Morgan MBE, a farmer from Sussex. In the early 1990s he joined a pen friend scheme run by the Prison Reform Trust and began corresponding with a life sentenced prisoner, Tom Shannon. Through Shannon's letters, Morgan learned about prison life and about the shocking levels of poor literacy amongst prisoners. In 1995 the letters were put together in a book titled, Invisible Crying Tree. The royalties from the sale of the book were used to found the Shannon Trust.

== Reading plan ==
Morgan took his idea for the Shannon Reading Plan to the Director General of the Prison Service who was sceptical and challenged him to make it work in HMP Wandsworth, a notoriously busy prison in London. It took a further three years of experimentation before the Shannon Reading Plan really started to impact on the lives of non-reading prisoners.

In 2001, Neil Lodge, a prison officer at HMP Wandsworth, took an interest in the Shannon Reading Plan and by the end of the year he had developed a workable plan and produced 48 new readers. Lodge observed that those involved not only benefited from learning to read but also from increased confidence, raised self-esteem and improved behaviour.

The major breakthrough came through the discovery of ‘Toe by Toe’ which is designed to help children and adults learn to read from the beginning. The Shannon Trust Reading Plan is a peer mentoring programme that encourages and supports prisoners who can read to give one-to-one support to prisoners who struggle to read. The Reading Plan, which runs in almost every prison in England, Wales and Northern Ireland, now uses Turning Pages, a reading programmed developed by the Trust specifically for adults in custody.

== Charitable status ==
The Shannon Trust has been granted charitable funding from many sources. Christopher Morgan and the Shannon Trust have won awards for their contribution to learning in prisons, including The Longford Prize in 2004 and the Centre for Social Justice award in 2005.
