= AudioBoom =

UK audio and podcast platform, created 2013

- Website type: On-Demand Audio & Podcasting Platform
- Available in: English, Spanish
- Traded as: AIM: BOOM
- Headquarters: London, United Kingdom
- No. of locations: London; New York City; Melbourne; Mumbai
- Area served: Worldwide
- CEO: Stuart Last
- Key people: Brad Clarke; Jon Del Strother
- Website: audioboom.com
- Launched: 2013; 13 years ago

AudioBoom PLC is an on-demand audio and podcasting distribution platform. AudioBoom offers business-to-business services to the radio, media and podcast industries.

AudioBoom's platform has been used to power on-demand audio for businesses including BBC, The Spectator Associated Press, NBC Sports, Yahoo!, Cumulus Media and Westwood One.

The company is based in London with offices in New York. It became AIM-listed on the London Stock Exchange in 2014 as Audioboom Group Limited (AIM: BOOM).

== History ==
The company was founded in 2009 by Mark Rock, a former co-founder of PlayJam, as Audioboom Limited, with funding from 4iP, Channel 4's technology innovation fund. The original name was Audioboo.fm.

The initial product was a "social sound sharing platform", a free iPhone app and a website that allowed users to share audio clips up to five minutes long. Early high-profile users included Stephen Fry, Chris Moyles, the British Library and The Guardian. The latter used it to cover the 2009 G20 London summit protests. The platform was also used to share audio during the Arab Spring.

In October 2012, Rob Proctor replaced Rock as CEO, and Rock left the company on 1 May 2013. Proctor refocused the business on providing content from professional broadcasters, and Audioboo was renamed audioBoom.

The main shareholders were UBC Media Group and Slovar Limited. In 2014 they sold their shares in a reverse takeover to the listed company One Delta plc., changing the name of the latter to Audioboom Group plc (AIM symbol BOOM).

The AudioBoom mobile app was discontinued in May 2019.

== Features ==
AudioBoom provides hosting, publishing, distribution and monetization services for on-demand content. Key features include:

- Unlimited audio hosting on branded content channels through a publisher dashboard
- Automated distribution through partnerships with Apple Podcasts, CastBox, Deezer, Google Podcasts, iHeart, RadioPublic, Spotify, Stitcher and TuneIn.
- Embeddable media players
- Advanced analytics and consumption data
- Monetization through podcast sponsorships and a built-in ad network

== Key users and partners ==
- Russell Brand's podcast series, featuring Matt Morgan and resident poet Mr. Gee, launched exclusively on AudioBoom in February 2015 and ended in May 2015.
- BBC Radio, including radios 2, 4 and 6, a number of local radio stations, and several World Service non-English language stations.
- The Premier League joined in late 2013, hosting its podcast and promoting the use of AudioBoom among Premier League clubs.
- Stephen Fry recorded a welcome message which was sent to all new users.

== Alternatives ==
- SoundCloud
