= Prison Radio Association =

British charity

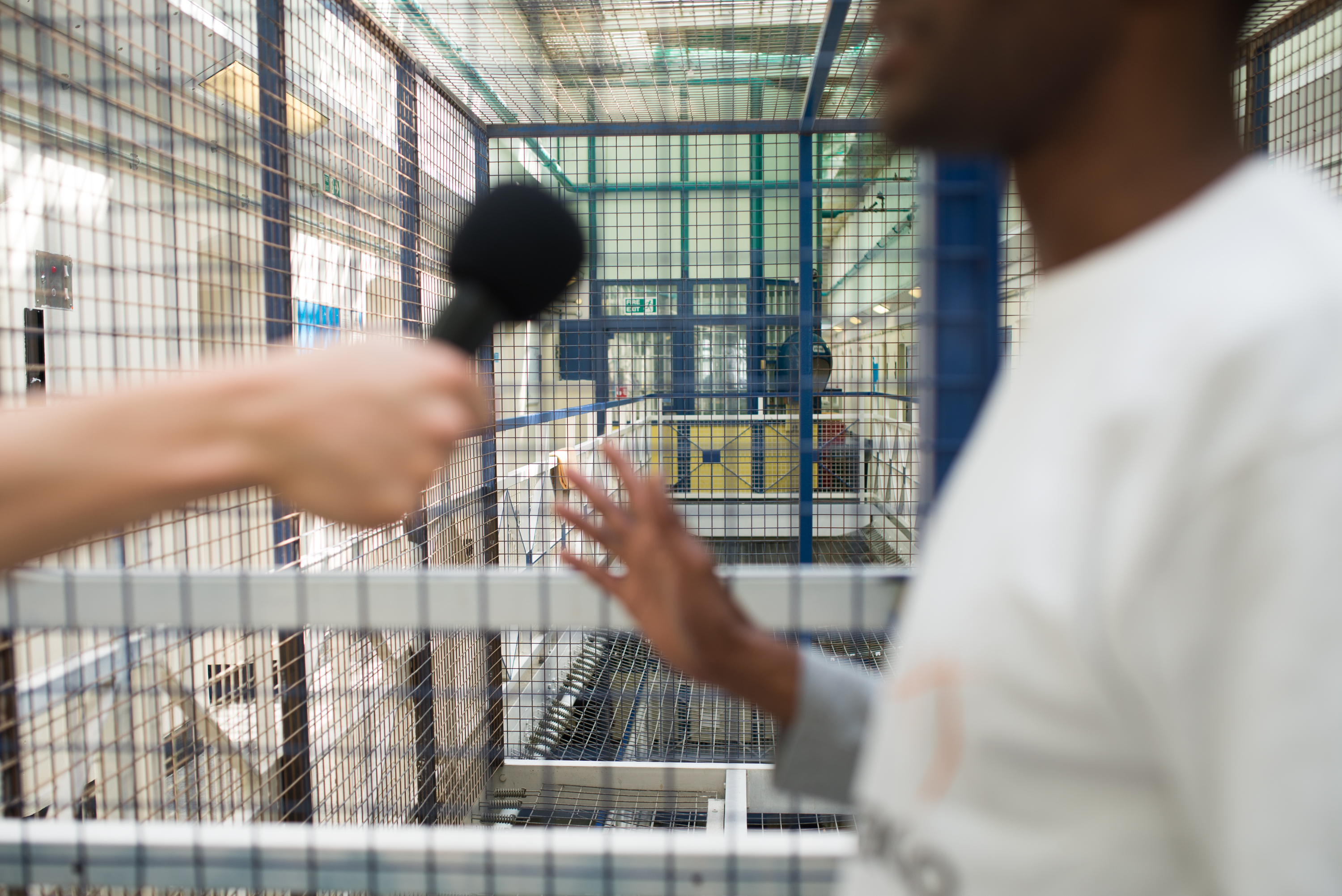
- Founded: 2006
- Founder: Roma Hooper OBE
- Type: Charitable organisation
- Registration no.: 1114760
- Location: HMP Brixton, London SW2 5XF
- Origins: Electric Radio Brixton
- Key people: Roma Hooper OBE (Founder/Chair); Phil Maguire (Chief Executive) Patrons: Jon Snow; Baroness Chakrabarti; Lord Phillips of Sudbury; Lord Hastings of Scarisbrick
- Website: prison.radio

The Prison Radio Association (PRA) is a British prison-based charity that operates National Prison Radio, a radio station which broadcasts programmes made by and for inmates in over 100 prisons in the United Kingdom and is the world's first national radio station of its kind.

Established in 2006, the PRA aims to reduce reoffending using the power of radio. Its objective is to support the education, relief and rehabilitation of offenders in custody and in the community, believing that equipping prisoners with skills and confidence is crucial in reducing reoffending rates.

Through National Prison Radio, the PRA helps provide prisoners with access to information on: accommodation; education; training and employment; health; drugs and alcohol; finance, benefits and debt; children and families; attitudes, thinking and behaviour.

== History ==
The PRA was established as a charity in 2006 by a number of people, including entrepreneur Roma Hooper OBE, advertising exec Mark Robinson and a manager at the BBC, Kieron Tilley. It was set up in response to increased interest from prisons across England and Wales in engaging with prison radio. The PRA aimed to offer guidance and expertise to prisons interested in setting up and running their own radio projects.

In November 2007, the PRA launched Electric Radio Brixton, a radio station which broadcast programmes made by prisoners directly into the cells of HMP Brixton. Following a visit to Electric Radio Brixton, Guardian columnist Zoe Williams said "This station sets a new standard not just for community radio, or charity radio, or cheap radio, but for all radio."

Electric Radio Brixton broke new ground by beating the biggest radio networks in the country to win four Sony Radio Academy Awards for its programming. To date, the PRA has won a total of 10 Sony Awards.

In 2009 Electric Radio Brixton re-launched as National Prison Radio, the world's first national radio service for prisoners. Part of a partnership with the National Offender Management Service, National Prison Radio began broadcasting 24 hours a day, seven days a week, as an audio channel via in-cell television.

In 2010, a production centre was opened in HMP Styal, a women's prison near Manchester. Through this project, the PRA was able to feature women's voices on National Prison Radio. The project continues to generate regular content for the service targeted at women.

In 2011, the PRA produced a radio documentary for National Prison Radio in partnership with the charity Victim Support. The programme featured prisoners serving sentences for violent crimes in a studio with people whose lives had been impacted by serious violence. It was produced by Marianne Garvey and presented by Professor Tanya Byron. The partnership won the Third Sector Excellence Award for Best Charity Partnership at the 2012 awards ceremony.

In 2012 National Prison Radio won Station of the Year at the Radio Academy Nations and Regions Awards. In the same year, the PRA produced its first programmes for BBC Radio.

By 2013, National Prison Radio was available in 100 prisons across England and Wales.

In April 2014, the PRA opened a new production centre in HMP Coldingley, a Category C prison in Surrey, allowing even more prisoners to contribute to National Prison Radio. Later that year, Andrew Selous, then Parliamentary Under Secretary of State, Minister for Prisons, Probation and Rehabilitation at the Ministry of Justice, officially opened National Prison Radio's refurbished studios in HMP Brixton.

In 2016, in its tenth anniversary year, it was awarded Charity of the Year at the Third Sector Awards.

== Activities ==
The PRA exists to reduce crime, using the power of radio. It broadcasts radio programmes into prison cells across England and Wales 24 hours a day, seven days a week, via National Prison Radio. Programmes include information and educational materials which support HMPPS’ reducing reoffending agenda. Three-quarters of prisoners listen to the station regularly

Programmes are produced by prisoners working alongside the charity's staff team of professional radio producers. The bulk of programming is produced in Styal and Brixton prisons, but in 2015, PRA staff began running pop-up radio production workshops in other prisons across the estate. Content generated from these workshops are broadcast on ‘NPR Takeover Days’. The project more than doubled the number of prisoners contributing to on-air programmes in a year, up from 475 prisoners in 2014 to 992 in 2015.

NPR broadcast its first-ever radio drama, Bound, in September 2015. Produced in partnership with BBC Radio Drama North, Bound was recorded in the BBC's drama studios and on location at HMP Styal. It told the story of a young pregnant prisoner fighting to keep her baby with her inside prison. The cast included serving prisoners and professional actors, including Sally Carman, John Henshaw and Matthew McNulty. Bound was broadcast by BBC Radio 4 in January 2017.

In December 2016 the PRA partnered with Letters Live, who organise live events where remarkable letters are read out onstage by outstanding performers before a live audience. The event, ‘Letters From The Inside’, was held in Brixton prison chapel and featured readings of letters sent by prisoners to National Prison Radio. Performers included Olivia Colman, Benedict Cumberbatch, Kate Tempest, Russell Brand, Matt Berry, Clarke Peters and Mark Strong, as well as serving and former prisoners. The performance was broadcast live on National Prison Radio.

== Impact ==
The PRA has developed a robust evaluation methodology with support from the BBC and RAJAR, which operates the UK's official audience measurement system for the radio industry. A significant proportion of NPR's audience is surveyed regularly throughout the year to gather data on the impact of individual campaigns and overall audience levels.

National Prison Radio has a potential listener base of around 80,000 people. Listeners tune in for 10.4 hours a week on average. 76% of prisoners listen regularly. In 2015, more than 6,400 letters were sent to National Prison Radio by prisoners and more than 3,100 song requests and messages of support were sent in by prisoners’ friends and families.

85% of prisoners say National Prison Radio's programmes have helped them to think about making a positive change to their lives.

== Staff and patrons ==
Key staff include Phil Maguire OBE (CEO) and Andrew Wilkie (Deputy CEO).

Patrons of the Prison Radio Association include television journalist Jon Snow, Baroness Shami Chakrabarti CBE, Lord Hastings of Scarisbrick CBE, George the Poet and Raphael Rowe.

Roma Hooper OBE and Mark Robinson OBE were made Honorary Presidents after stepping down as Trustees in 2022.

== Awards ==
2019 British Podcast Awards – Best New Podcast (Bronze) & Best Interview (Bronze)

2018 Audio & Radio Industry Awards (ARIAS) – Best Fictional Storytelling (Gold) & Best Podcast (Bronze)

2017 Audio Production Awards – Indie of the Year (Gold) & Grassroots (Gold)

2017 D&AD Impact Awards – Promise Award Winner

2017 New York Festivals International Radio Program Awards – Information / Documentary (Double Silver)

2017 Third Sector Excellence Awards – Chief Executive of the Year (Finalist)

2016 Third Sector Excellence Awards – Charity of the Year

2016 Audio Production Awards – Grassroots Category Winner

2016 Rose d’Or – Audio Stories Category Winner

2016 New York Festivals International Radio Program Awards – Social Issues Category Gold Winner & Biography/Profile Category Bronze Winner

2015 & 2014 Radio Production Awards – Indie of the Year (Silver & Bronze) Award Winner

2014 Third Sector Excellence Awards – Enterprise Award Winner

2013, 2012, 2011, 2010 & 2009 Sony Radio Academy Awards – 10 Sonys in five years

2013 & 2012 Radio Academy Nations & Regions Awards – London and South East Station of the Year

2013 The Daily Telegraph and Prison Reform Trust Longford Prize – Main Prize Winner

2013 IVCA Clarion Awards – Radio Station Category and Champion Award Winner

2012 Third Sector Excellence Awards – Charity Partnership Winner (with Victim Support)

2011 Sandford St Martin Trust – Merit Award Winner

2010 Jerusalem Awards – Good Friday Category Winner

2009 IVCA Clarion Awards – Radio Station Category Winner

2008 Charity Times Awards – Best New Charity
