= Edith Bowman =

Scottish radio DJ and television presenter (born 1974)

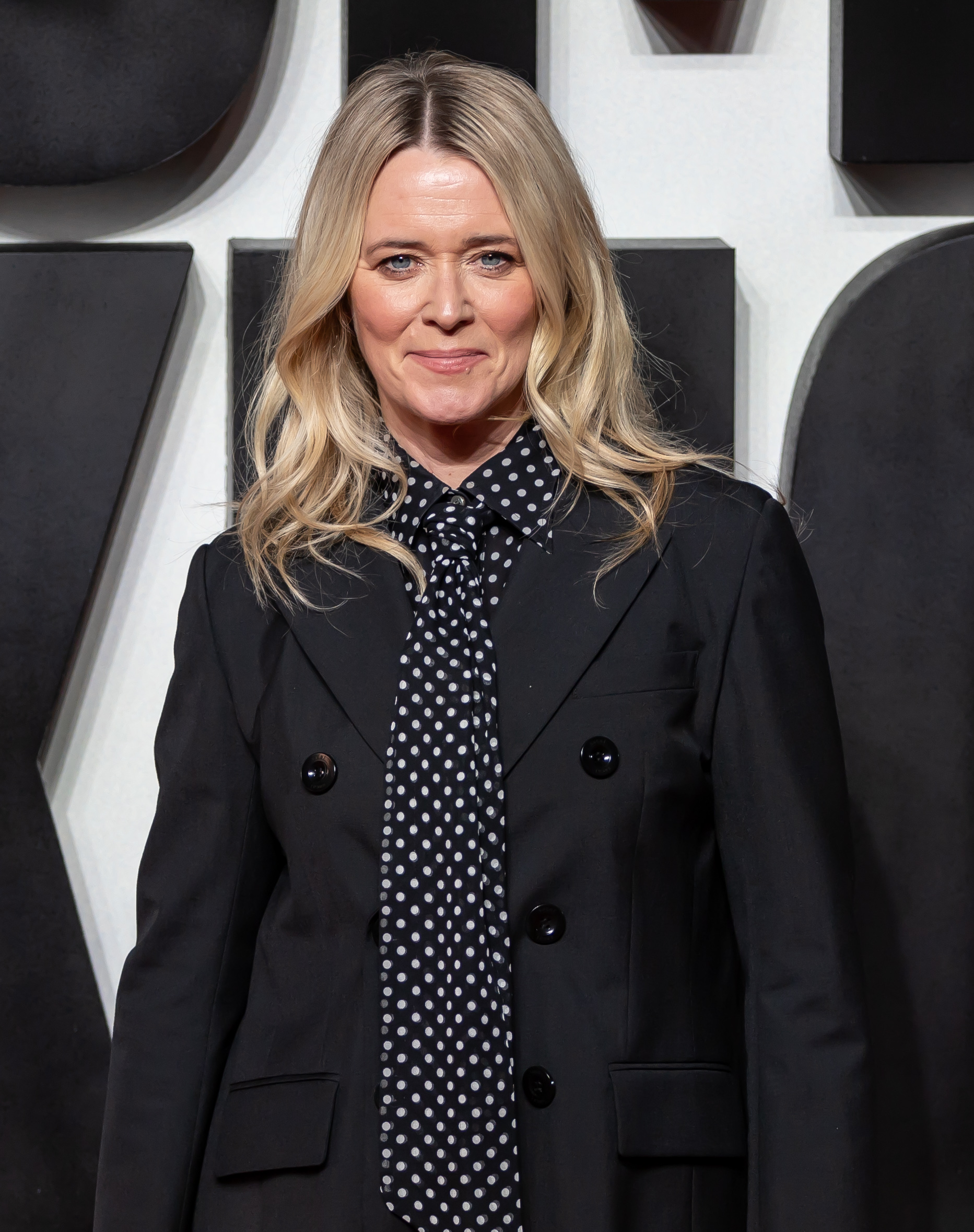
- Bowman in 2025
- Born: 1974 (age 51–52); Anstruther, Fife, Scotland
- Occupations: DJ, presenter
- Employers: BBC Radio 3 Unwind (2024–); BBC Radio 1 (2003–2014); Channel 4 (2002–2003)
- Spouse: Tom Smith (m. 2013)
- Children: 2

Edith Eleanor Bowman (born 1974) is a Scottish radio DJ and television presenter. She hosted Colin and Edith, weekday afternoons, weekend breakfast, and The Radio 1 Review on BBC Radio 1 until 2014 and has presented a variety of music-related television shows and music festivals. Since 2016, she has presented the podcast Soundtracking, which has also arranged live recordings. Since 2020, Bowman has hosted the annual Scottish Music Awards ceremony.

== Early life ==
Bowman was born in 1974 in Anstruther, Fife, Scotland. She attended secondary school at Waid Academy in Anstruther and then continued her studies in Media and Communication at Queen Margaret University, Edinburgh.

== Media career ==
=== Television ===
Bowman's first on-screen job on television was as a news reader on MTV UK. She went on to host many shows for the station, including co-presenting chart show Hitlist UK with Cat Deeley, with whom she also presented travel show Roadtripping for BBC Choice in 2002. She also worked as a presenter on Channel 4's breakfast show RI:SE when it launched on 29 April 2002. In 2004, she co-presented the BBC Scotland series Teen Commandments with Cameron Stout. After occasional appearances in 2003, Bowman co-presented Top of the Pops until the end of the series, replacing Fearne Cotton while she was away. In total she appeared on the show ten times including the final weekly episode. She returned to Top of the Pops for the 2006 Christmas Special. In 2020, during the Coronavirus pandemic, she remotely interviewed the film maker Sofia Coppola for the BBC4 series Life Cinematic.

She has also presented various music programmes for Channel 4 such as Channel 4 Presents..., Evo Music Rooms, and TBA. Bowman also appeared on children's art program SMart in 2007 and has appeared in coverage of festivals such as Glastonbury, T in the Park and Reading and Leeds Festival, for both BBC Radio and TV. On 29 April 2011, she was a reporter for BBC TV on their coverage of the wedding of Prince William and Catherine Middleton. In 2011, she narrated Channel 5's documentary series McFly on the Wall.

In December 2021, Bowman appeared in an episode of Celebrity Antiques Road Trip, alongside fellow Radio 2 broadcaster Mark Radcliffe.

In August 2024, Bowman was a quarter-finalist on the nineteenth series of Celebrity MasterChef.

=== Radio ===
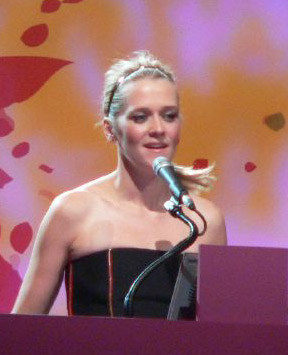
Edith Bowman presenting at the BT Digital Music Awards in 2006

Bowman presented Hit Music Sunday with Cat Deeley on Capital London from 2001 to 2002. On 29 March 2003, she teamed up with Colin Murray, who had also worked on RI:SE, to co-host Colin and Edith on BBC Radio 1. In April 2004 this show moved from a weekend morning slot to weekday afternoons, broadcasting between 13:00 and 16:00, after the departure of Mark and Lard from the station. In August 2006, Bowman became the sole occupier of the BBC Radio 1 afternoon 13:00 to 16:00 slot, with Murray taking over a late-night specialist music programme. In September 2008, she returned to the station after maternity leave, initially taking over from Dick and Dom on the Sunday Morning Lie In from 10:00 to 13:00. She returned to weekday afternoons on 3 November 2008.

In July 2009 it was announced that Radio 1 was to change its daytime schedule, and this saw Bowman move to Weekend Breakfast. She said that she felt she had taken her shows as far as she could, and the move meant she could create a new show for a new market. In February 2012, it was announced that Bowman was being replaced by Gemma Cairney on Weekend Breakfast, and would move to Tuesday evenings, in order to take over The Review Show, from DJ Nihal. Bowman left weekends on 1 April 2012, but continued on different projects through out-of-house productions which air on the station. Her first show of the new Review Show was on 26 March 2013.

In November 2012, she started co-hosting a Saturday morning show on BBC Radio 6 Music, alongside Adam Buxton. In June 2014, Radio 1 announced that The Review Show would be cancelled on 1 September 2014, ending Bowman's career at the station.

In February 2016, she was announced as the only solo, female, breakfast show host on commercial radio, with the launch of Virgin Radio UK on 30 March. She left the programme on 29 September 2017. Bowman was an occasional stand-in presenter of Kermode and Mayo's Film Review on BBC Radio 5 Live, on BBC Radio 2 she also provides holiday cover for its presenters including Jo Whiley, Sara Cox, Gary Davies on Sounds of the 80s, and Fearne Cotton on Sounds of the 90s.

Bowman is the host of Cinematic Soundtracks on BBC Radio 3 Unwind since the station's launch in November 2024. In 2025, Edith Bowman has been presenting episodes of "Sounds of Cinema" on BBC Radio 3 on Saturday afternoons.

=== Podcast ===
Bowman has presented Soundtracking, a weekly half hour podcast in which she interviews film-makers about musical influences and their choice of music in films.

== Career milestones ==
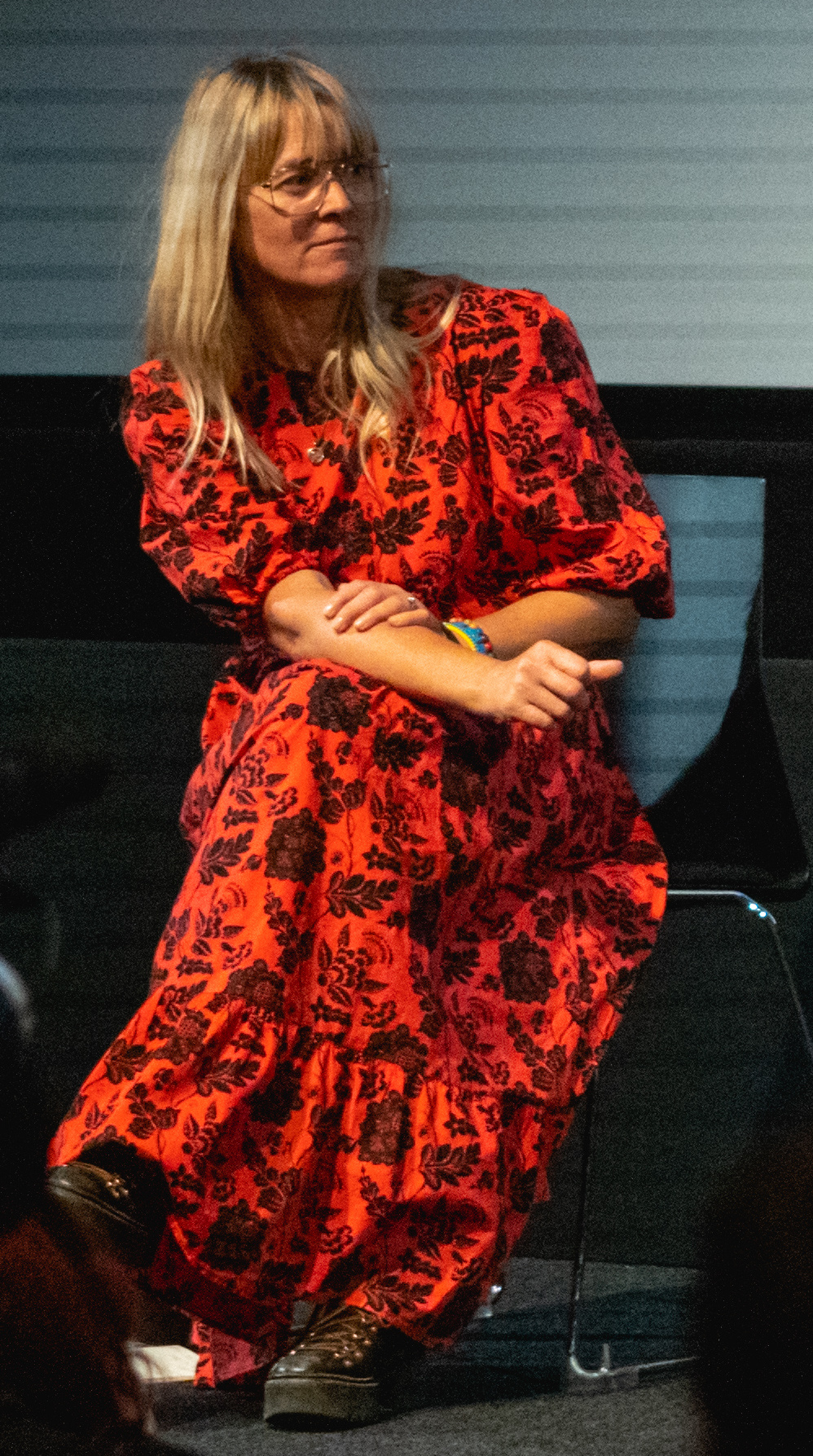
Bowman hosting The Sparks Brothers Q&A in 2021

In 2005, Bowman presented BBC Scotland's coverage of the Live 8 event at Murrayfield Stadium in Edinburgh, and hosted the network's T in the Park programmes with Dougie Anderson who had also worked on RI:SE. Also in 2005, she hosted the Q Awards with Colin Murray live on BBC Radio 1. She also presented the BBC Three coverage of Glastonbury, T in the Park and the Reading Festival with Colin Murray. She also hosted the TV coverage of the first Electric Proms with Zane Lowe. On 7 July 2007, she co-presented the BBC coverage of Live Earth.

After leaving Radio 1, Bowman presented several one-off film specials for Channel 4. She also presented Evo Music Rooms a late night music programme for Channel 4 and The Vue Film Show, also for Channel 4. In 2011, she presented coverage of the T in the Park music festival for BBC Three. She also had a stint with BBC America as an entertainment presenter in 2014.

== Charity interests ==
In May 2008, Bowman supported the Fashion Targets Breast Cancer campaign in support of Breakthrough Breast Cancer, alongside fellow celebrities: comedian Alan Carr, actress Anna Friel, singer Natalie Imbruglia and model Twiggy.

From 2015 until 2017 Bowman hosted the annual Young Scot Awards.

== Singing ==
Bowman's television debut was on the Grampian Television talent show The Big Break. At the age of 14, she covered Bananarama's "Venus" which was itself a cover of the Shocking Blue original, but finished joint last in her heat.

On 11 March 2005 she won the TV talent show Comic Relief Does Fame Academy, a charity music contest in which she sang "Champagne Supernova" with Jools Holland's band. Earlier in the competition she sang a version of Blondie's "Hanging on the Telephone". The show also featured Al Murray, Kim Medcalf, Adrian Edmondson, Jon Culshaw, Konnie Huq, Dawn Steele, and other celebrities.

== Personal life ==
Bowman married Editors frontman Tom Smith in 2013, and the couple have two sons.
