= Hull Colour Pages =

Local telephone directory in England

KC Colour Pages and KC White Pages are the classified and residential telephone directories provided specifically for the Kingston Communications service area. KC Colour Pages became the UK's first classified telephone directory when it was first published in 1954 to celebrate KC's 50th anniversary as Hull's telephone company. The Golden Pages, as the first KC Colour Pages was initially called, carried advertising from a wide range of customers including taxis, sail makers, driving schools, painters and decorators and office machinery suppliers amongst others.

By 1992 the Hull Yellow Pages had become so popular with both telephone subscribers and advertisers that it was necessary to split the directory into two separate books, business and residential. Hull Colour Pages continued to grow and in 1998 produced the UK's first full-colour business directory, changing the directory's name from Hull Yellow Pages to Hull Colour Pages in the process. After a rebrand of Kingston Communications to KC in 2010 the Hull Colour Pages was renamed KC Colour Pages.

== Online directory ==
In 1999 Hull Colour Pages launched its Online Directory which, whilst not the UK's first online directory, set the scene for further innovation when, in 2004, Hull Colour Pages launched the UK's first online directory advertising proofing system, enabling its advertisers to review and either accept or amend their advertisements via a web interface. In the same year, Hull Colour Pages introduced the recycling programme Re:fresh, an initiative operated in partnership with local schools encouraging recycling of old directories.

== Competition ==
Contemporaneously with this in July 2004 Yell announced that they were directly entering the Hull classified directory marketplace for the first time, thereby creating the classic David & Goliath scenario where Yell, as the national Goliath, took on Hull Colour Pages' regional David.

To counter Yell's move into the Hull and East Riding advertising marketplace, Hull Colour Pages launched the 'Proud to be a Part of Local Life' brand initiative, emphasising the central role in local life Hull Colour Pages has played since 1954.

Despite particularly high levels of advertising spend Yell were not able to gain more than a toehold in the Hull marketplace as Hull Colour Pages not only retained customers and revenue but in a positive response to the national threat posed by Yell, introduced new sales strategies that were successful in maintaining and growing the customer base and advertising revenues.

The success of this sales strategy was recognised in 2005 when the Hull Colour Pages sales team was declared 'Sales Team of the Year' at the Data Publishers Association (DPA) Awards and the Hull Colour Pages was highly commended in the Directory of the Year section.

== Sponsorship ==
Hull Colour Pages was a founder sponsor of the Hull Comedy Festival when it launched in 2007. Making the most of Hull City's promotion to the Premier League Hull Colour Pages are sponsoring KCFM's Away Game commentaries during the 2008-09 season.

== Local promotions ==
In the same year, Hull Colour Pages was the first UK directory to provide each home and business across Hull and the East Riding with a unique personalised copy of the directory, using inkjet numbering techniques to give each directory an individual number which allowed directory users to participate in local promotions, competitions and loyalty schemes.

== Showroom sites ==
For 2008 Hull Colour Pages has also introduced showroom sites a three-page entry-level website given free to its advertisers, listing menus from local restaurants and takeaways, brand search allowing consumers to search for brand stockists through Hull Colour Pages Online and full-colour advertising in the residential telephone directory - Hull White Pages.

== Awards ==
These developments combined with the continued high performance on advertising sales has resulted in Hull Colour Pages being recognised by the UK trade-body for directories, The DPA (Data Publishers Association) with short-listings in five categories for the DPA AWards in October 2008.

== Personnel ==
The KC Colour Pages leadership team comprises

- Director: Anita Pace
- Sales Manager: Richard Moore
- Business Development Manager: Rachel Mellors
- Online Services Manager: Duncan Woodward
- HR Consultant: Debbie Turner

== See also ==
- KCOM Group
- Electronic Yellow Pages
- Loren M. Berry - Inventor of the Yellow Pages concept
- White pages - Residential (non commercial) counterpart of the Yellow Pages
- Blue pages - Government related counterpart
- Yellowikis
