= Wendy Tan White =

British technology entrepreneur and technology investor

Wendy Tan White MBE
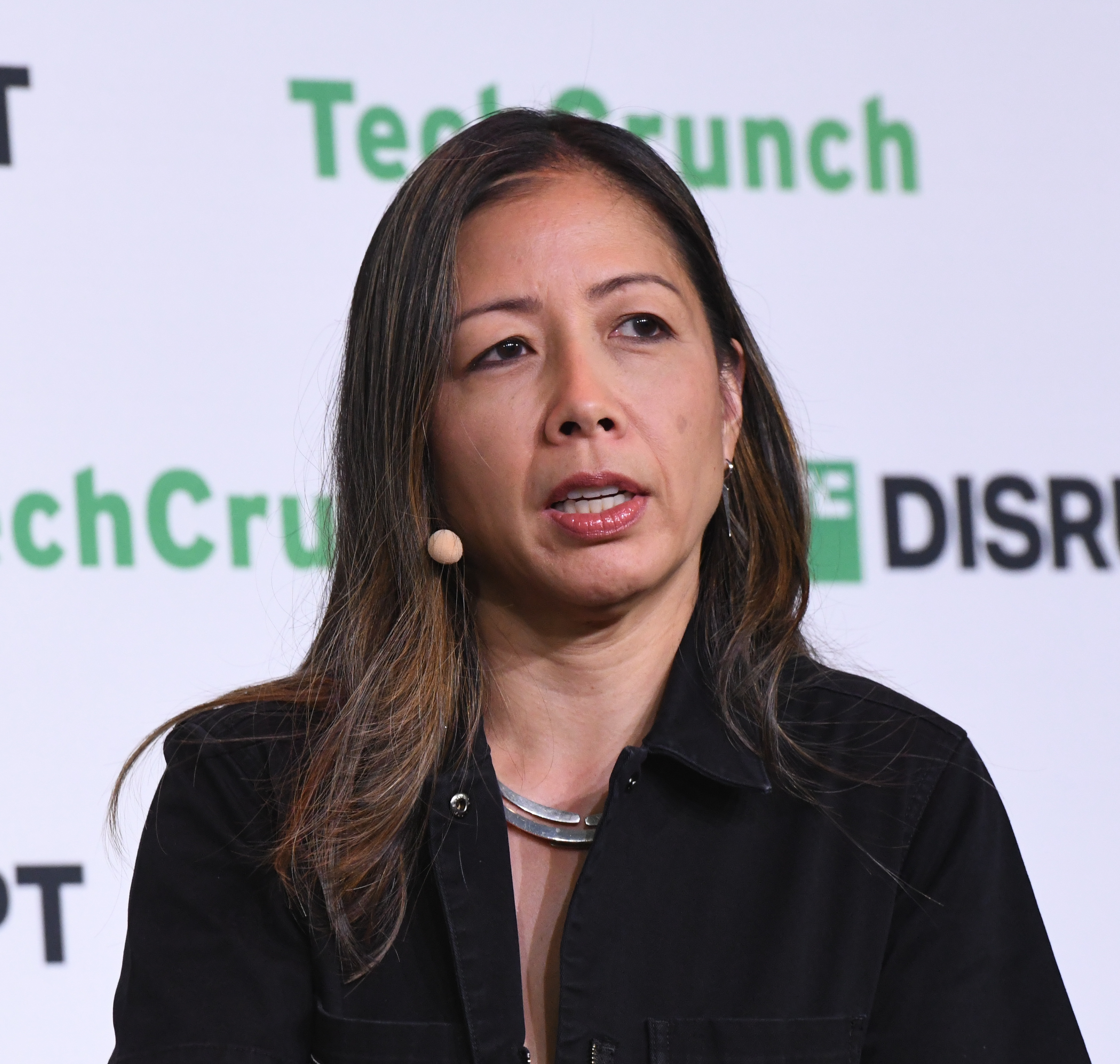
- Tan White in 2023
- Born: Salford, England
- Education: BEng, Computer Science, Imperial College London; MA, Future Materials Design, Central Saint Martins, London
- Occupation: CEO of Intrinsic
- Employer: Alphabet
- Children: 2

Wendy Tan White MBE is a British technology entrepreneur and technology investor. She is the CEO of Intrinsic, a robotics software company under Alphabet Inc.

She was previously a partner at BGF, a £2.5bn growth capital fund focusing on early stage ventures. She was the co-founder and former CEO of the Moonfruit website builder platform and former general partner at Entrepreneur First. In January 2019, Tan White joined Alphabet's moonshot company X as Vice-President.

Wendy is the Chair, Imperial College US Advisory Board, the visiting Clore Innovation professor at RCA and a member of World Economic Forum’s 2030 Vision Technology Leaders Group. She was named one of the Fifty Most Inspiring Women in European Tech in 2017 and Women in IT Awards Business Role Model of the Year 2017 and Entrepreneur of the Year in 2011, she is an advocate for women entering the technology and investment sector.

== Early life and education ==
Wendy Tan White was born in Salford, Lancashire, England. Her father is a Burmese émigré and her mother a native of Sarawak, Malaysia. The family moved several times to accommodate her father's work in IT, residing in Cumbernauld, Scotland, and in Reading, where her mother also worked in IT.

Tan White studied at Kendrick Grammar School before earning a bachelor of engineering degree in computer science at Imperial College London in 1992. In 2008 she completed a master's degree in Future Materials Design at Central Saint Martins.

== Career ==
Tan White began her career at Arthur Andersen. She was a software project manager at AIT Plc from 1994 to 1997 then worked as head of CRM software development for Egg Banking, the first U.K. Internet bank.

In January 2000, she, Eirik Pettersen, and Joe White launched Moonfruit, the first SAAS website builder. The company experienced rapid growth, with 400,000 users signing on in the first six months. The business' lack of scalability, combined with the dot-com crash in 2000, caused it to fail in this incarnation. Tan White and Pettersen trimmed the staff from 60 employees to just the two of them. Moonfruit's co-founder and Tan White’s future husband Joe White resigned to work at McKinsey & Co. They switched from an advertiser-supported service to a subscription-based service, customers resuscitated the business. By 2004 the company started to scale and achieved profitability.

From 2004 to 2008, Tan White took a break from the company to start a family, and Joe White returned to the business to take her place as CEO and continue to scale the business. During her time away from Moonfruit, Tan White completed a master's degree in design, helped launch the Zopa peer-to-peer lending website, and worked as a director at Gandi.

In 2012, Moonfruit was acquired by Yell Group for £37 million. Tan White stayed on as CEO while White was the chief operating officer and chief financial officer, and Pettersen was the chief technology officer.

In 2015, Tan White became a general partner of Entrepreneur First along with her husband Joe White helping to raise EF's Next Stage Fund and mentoring 21 deep tech companies which have been funded including PassFort, OpenCosmos, CloudNC, Automata, CleoAI, Accurx, Xihelm and Brolly.

In October 2017, Tan White joined Simon Calver, Rory Stirling and Harry Briggs as a partner for early stage BGF Ventures part of BGF, £2.5bn patient capital fund.

Tan White, Stirling and Briggs left BGF Ventures to pursue pure tech investment particularly 'Deep Tech'. BGF Ventures is expanding to different sectors and regions with more capital. Tan White remained an adviser to BGF.

In January 2019, Tan White joined Alphabet's moonshot company X as Vice-President. In July 2021, Tan White and team launched Intrinsic, a new Alphabet company spun out of X that she would lead. The company develops software for industrial robotics.

== Affiliations ==
Tan White is on the board of Planet Labs, a board trustee of the Alan Turing Institute, board member of TechNation (TechCityUK), member of the Digital Economic Council, advisory board Imperial College, Dept of Computing and advisory board Dyson, Design School of Engineering (Imperial College and Royal School of Art).

== Honours and awards ==
Tan White was appointed Member of the Order of the British Empire (MBE) in the 2016 Birthday Honours for services to technology businesses. and Women in IT - Business Role Model of the Year 2017. She was awarded an honorary doctorate by Salford University in July 2018.

In 2015 and 2017, Tan White was named one of the Fifty Most Inspiring Women in European Tech by the Inspiring Fifty organisation. In July 2015, Tan White and Joe White were ranked 5th on Business Insider India's list of the "13 Coolest Power Couples in London". In 2017, they were voted into the Europas, Hall of Fame.

In 2013, Computer Weekly named Tan White a "Rising Star" as part of their "Most Influential Women in UK IT" campaign.

In 2011, she was named Entrepreneur of the Year at the CWT Everywoman in Technology Awards.

== Other activities ==
Tan White is an advocate for women entering the technology and investment sectors. In 2000, Moonfruit accommodated employees who are parents with scheduling such as "a later start to accommodate the school run, or flexi-home working."

== Personal life ==
She married Moonfruit co-founder, Joe White, in 2002. He was the first HM Tech Envoy to the US while also being Consul General of San Francisco. They have two kids — one son and one daughter. Tan White and her family live in Silicon Valley.

== Selected articles ==
- "Entrepreneurialism Isn't Just a Man's World". HuffPost. 4 September 2013.
- "'Geeky and not for girls': Technology's big image problem". The Guardian. 19 June 2013.
