= Electronic Yellow Pages =

Online telephone directories of businesses sorted by category

Electronic Yellow Pages are online versions of traditional printed business directories produced by telephone companies around the world. Typical functionalities of online yellow pages include the alphabetical listings of businesses and search functionality of the business database by name, business or location. Since Electronic Yellow Pages are not limited by space considerations, they often contain far more comprehensive business information such as vicinity maps, company profiles, product information, and more.

An advantage of Electronic Yellow Pages is that they can be updated in real time; therefore, listed businesses are not constrained by once-a-year publishing of the printed version which leads to greater accuracy of the listings since contact information may change at any time.

Before the popularity of the internet, business telephone numbers in the United Kingdom could be searched by accessing a remote computer terminal by modem. The initial prototype of this was superseded in 1990 with a commercial service. This service allowed searches via Name, Business classification and locality for business listings and a free text field was provided to allow "unstructured text" searching of Adverts. This dialup service was available via Prestel and "BT Gold" services. The service Electronic Yellow Pages was superseded in the mid-1990s by the internet service www.yell.com. A similar system called Phonebase for published residential phone numbers was discontinued in the 1990s, being superseded by a web-based search interface.

== History ==
The first true online Yellow Pages, was a creation based on the independent YP publisher in Seattle, Washington called Banana Pages. This was the first print directory which was registered with both YPPA (the Yellow Pages Publishers Association), and the ADP (Association of Directory Publishers) to place their listings online. The Yellow Pages product was the brain child of the co-owner brothers of the company, Peter and John Richards. Many RBOCS (Regional Bell Operating Companies) would follow. Banana Pages eventually became YPI (Yellow Pages on the Internet, Inc) which was sold to InfoSpace.com and became their Yellow Pages offering to cobrands.

Among the first to place their listings on the Web was Pacific Bell's now-defunct “At Hand” online yellow pages that was officially launched on August 30, 1996. At Hand debuted with approximately 1.2 million merchant listings from across California. At the time, the service was competing with BigBook.com, a nationwide Web directory that was since absorbed by SuperPages.

Although it is “old hat” now, At Hand allowed an online visitor to look for a French restaurant in a given town and get an interactive map. If the restaurant has paid for an enhanced listing, the visitor could also find out other information, such as whether it took American Express or if it served bouillabaisse. At Hand showcased editorial content from 14 publishers, including HarperCollins, the Hearst Corporation, the New York Times Company and American Express.

Another early entrant into the then-$11 billion yellow pages industry occurred in 1997 when four Baby Bells banded together to create a co-branded Web site and initiated a $1 million marketing campaign to drive more traffic to their regional yellow pages sites. That "original yellow pages" site was simply a map of the United States, where users could click on any state and be linked to the appropriate online directory, as published by Ameritech, BellSouth, Pacific Bell, or US West. The site experienced stiff competition from Big Yellow (now part of SuperPages) and SuperPages itself.

On Nov. 4, 2004 SBC Communications Incorporated (now AT&T) and BellSouth announced a joint venture to acquire Yellowpages.com. The venture utilized the highly recognized brand name to become the market leader in local search (Internet). At the time of acquisitions, it was expected that the YellowPages.com site would receive more than 50 million consumer searches per month.

In 2005, Amazon.com elbowed its way into the online yellow pages business, with a new service from its A9.com search engine, featuring photo-rich listings that allow an online visitor to “wander around” near a given destination.

According to market research company the Kelsey Group, advertising in online yellow pages is rapidly expanding but still only retain less than 7% of the total market, including online and print. The reason for this is that traditional yellow pages publishers, such as the phone companies, have big sales forces to approach local businesses.

MarketWatch, an online financial newsletter, carried an article on Dec. 18, 2006 detailing how mobile online yellow pages were enhancing small business lead generation. The article noted that Internet-based yellow pages, local search and Wireless was growing by an estimated 30.5% versus print advertising, and that a company could only benefit from this online growth by being listed in an Internet-based directory.

== Search Engines ==
Search engines such as Google Maps carry a significant number of business listings, often rivaling and sometimes exceeding the number of listings found in the traditional online yellow pages. These search engine results are a very effective way to reach new customers.

Search engine listings can often be edited by users, not just business owners. It is therefore important for business owners to verify and register their business address with all the major search engines.

Some of the problems associated with search engine advertising is click fraud. This is when ads are clicked on with no intention of purchasing anything. The search engines still charge the advertiser for these clicks, if the advertiser does not discover the fraud. Many online advertisers have discovered that clicks do not equal calls.

Many small businesses find the search engine keyword model very complicated. The average category in an Internet Yellow Pages would take an average of 20different keywords/search terms to "cover" on a search engine. For example, a plumber might need to buy leaky sink, leaky pipe, Toilet repair, sink repair, drain cleaning and on and on. It is easier for many businesses to buy an ad under "plumbers" in their local IYP's.

== Migration of Physical Publishers to Electronic Yellow Pages ==
Electronic Yellow Pages or Online Yellow Pages use software to quickly edit and change online content for display on the internet. Printed Yellow Pages or business directories often discontinue publication to limit printing costs and instead publish directly to the internet as a web directory. Online yellow pages or directories continue publishing online because advertisers pay for the visual exposure from those who read or use these online publications on the internet. Publishers or people that create these online directories create software with their own resources or use open-source or off-the-shelf software to build their website or online directory. Banana Pages was an online directory function built with their own resources. The cost of online yellow pages or online directory software is limited compared to the large cost of physical printing and distribution of a phone book or directory of information.

== See also ==
- Yellow Pages
- YellowPagesGoesGreen.Org
- White pages - Residential (as opposed to commercial) counterpart of the Yellow Pages
- Blue pages - Government related counterpart
- Yellowikis
