= J. R. Hartley =

Fictional character

J.R. Hartley
- First appearance: Yellow Pages commercial 1983
- Portrayed by: Norman Lumsden

In-universe information
- Gender: Male
- Occupation: Writer
- Nationality: British

J. R. Hartley is a fictional character in a popular advertisement created by the agency Abbott Mead Vickers for the British Yellow Pages, first shown in 1983 when British Telecom was privatised.

== Plot ==
The advertisement shows an elderly gentleman (played by Norman Lumsden) asking in several second hand bookshops for "Fly Fishing by J. R. Hartley". No bookshop has it, and he goes home dejected. His daughter, sympathising, hands him the Yellow Pages; one of the shops he phones has a copy. He is delighted and asks them to keep it for him. The unheard questioner asks for his name and he responds at dictation speed: 'My name? Oh, yes, it's J. R. Hartley.' The advertisement ends by promoting the Yellow Pages, the voiceover provided by actor Joss Ackland.

== Reception ==
In 2015, a poll was carried out to mark the 60th anniversary of the first British television advertisement break. This advertisement was rated fifth most popular with 7% of the vote.

== Legacy ==
Author Michael Russell wrote and published a spoof called Fly Fishing: Memories of Angling Days, by J. R. Hartley in 1991. The book was a best seller and led to two additional best sellers under the pseudonym J. R. Hartley: J.R. Hartley Casts Again – More Memories of Angling Days (1992) and Golfing by J.R. Hartley (1995). When Lumsden died on 28 November 2001 at the age of 95, the advertisement was broadcast again in his memory, nearly 20 years after its first appearance. In February 2011, Yellow Pages re-made the advertisement, with fictional DJ Day V. Lately searching for a copy of his trance remix "Pulse and Thunder", which was released for sale at the same time.

In a nod to the original advert, Yellow Pages' online site Yell.com hold an annual award ceremony for their employees, the awards are called "The Yell Hartley Awards"

As a tribute to the original advertisement, Scottish comedian and Scottish BAFTA award winner Limmy has reenacted a modern take on the advertisement,

== See also ==
- I, Libertine
- List of pseudonyms of angling authors
