= Norman Lumsden =

English opera singer and actor

- Born: Norman Thompson; 16 September 1906; Chelsea, London, England
- Died: 28 November 2001 (aged 95); Ealing, London, England
- Occupations: Opera singer, actor
- Known for: "J. R. Hartley" Yellow Pages advert
- Spouse(s): Daisy Wimhurst (m. 1933) Irene Palmer (m. 1952)
- Children: 1

Norman Lumsden (16 September 1906 – 28 November 2001) was an English opera singer and actor. He first came to prominence during the 1940s and 1950s in several operas by composer Benjamin Britten, often performing at Covent Garden and the Aldeburgh and Glyndebourne festivals. He later began a television acting career during the 1970s appearing mostly in small roles in TV dramas. He branched out into films during the 1980s, notably appearing in Clint Eastwood's 1990 film White Hunter, Black Heart. He is particularly remembered for his portrayal of J. R. Hartley in the 1983 Yellow Pages advert Fly Fishing by J. R. Hartley, in 2015 voted fifth most popular British TV advertisement.

== Early life and education ==
Born Norman Thompson in Chelsea in 1906, Lumsden was the son of a butler. He originally worked as a commercial artist, designing book jackets for the publishers Hodder & Stoughton, including those for Leslie Charteris's The Saint series. After suffering a bout of emphysema he took up singing on the advice of his doctor to strengthen his lungs. He was taught by the basses Robert Radford and Norman Allin.

== Early career ==
Lumsden's singing career began before World War II with singing popular classics on the wireless and performing in oratorio around Britain. His first radio broadcast was for the BBC in the 1930s, during which he sang Negro spirituals and Czechoslovak songs by Dvořák. It was at this time that he changed his surname to Lumsden. In 1945 he gave an acclaimed debut recital at London's Wigmore Hall, performing arias from Handel and Verdi, and taking small roles at Sadler's Wells.

Lumsden's singing talents were recognised by Benjamin Britten, who described him as, "that rare British product, a true bass". Lumsden was an original member of the ensemble of the English Opera Group, founded by Britten and Peter Pears in 1947. A bass, Lumsden had a distinguished career as an opera singer, performing several times at the Royal Opera House in London's Covent Garden, and also at the Aldeburgh and Glyndebourne festivals. He created roles in the first performances of several of Britten's works, including Quince the carpenter in A Midsummer Night's Dream (1960), a role Britten wrote particularly with Lumsden's voice in mind, Superintendent Budd in Albert Herring (1947), and Black Bob in the children's opera The Little Sweep (1949). He also appeared in Britten's Billy Budd, and played Collatinus in The Rape of Lucretia, and Peachum in Britten's adaptation of The Beggar's Opera. Lumsden also took part in Britten's first 13 Aldeburgh Festivals between 1948 and 1960.

== Family ==
In 1952 Lumsden married Irene Palmer with whom he had one son. His wife was a soprano and during the 1950s they appeared in cabaret together, performing extracts from musicals at seaside resorts and London hotels. In 1967 Lumsden returned to the English Opera Group to create the role of Luka in William Walton's opera The Bear at the 1967 Aldeburgh Festival.

== Later career ==
Lumsden embarked on a second career as a dramatic actor during the 1970s. After appearing in a commercial for cracker biscuits in 1970, Lumsden began to appear in small roles in TV dramas, including the BBC's Play for Today, Edna, the Inebriate Woman (1971), The Sweeney (1978), The Hunchback of Notre Dame (1982), Minder (1984) in which he played the role of a vicar in the episode Senior Citizen Caine, Agatha Christie's Poirot (1989), One Foot in the Grave (1990), Jeeves and Wooster (1990), and The Detectives (1993). His film appearances were sparse but included roles in Runners (1983), A Handful of Dust (1988), and White Hunter Black Heart (1990) with Clint Eastwood.

He found fame late in life, through the Yellow Pages 1983 TV advert in which Lumsden played J. R. Hartley, a fictional character in search of an out of print book called Fly Fishing by 'J. R. Hartley'. The advertisement is one of the most popular ever made in Britain, and remained a part of popular culture long after it ceased to be shown. Although he was most famous for playing Fly Fishing author J. R. Hartley, Lumsden did not actually take up fishing until he was 85 years old. The advert left such a lasting impression that a real book titled Fly Fishing was published under the J. R. Hartley pseudonym with Lumsden being hired to promote it as J. R. Hartley. The advert was reworked and remade for a new generation in 2011, 28 years later, this time featuring a middle-aged DJ looking for his only hit in old record shops, not finding any luck until his daughter gives him the Yellow Pages (now on an iPhone 4G), with him finding the record.

== Death ==
In 2001 Lumsden contracted shingles and died from subsequent infection at the age of 95. After his death the "Fly Fishing by J. R. Hartley" advert was rebroadcast as a tribute.
