= Rafu Telephone Guide =

Business telephone directory

Rafu Telephone guide
- Type: Yellow Pages
- Owner: Japan Publicity, Inc.
- Publisher: Toshihiko Takabatake
- Founded: 1981 (published in 1982)
- Language: Japanese / English
- Headquarters: 385 Van Ness Ave. #110; Torrance, CA 90501; United States
- Circulation: 65,000
- Website: telephoneguide.com

First published in 1982 by Japan Publicity, Inc., the Rafu Telephone Guide (羅府テレフォンガイド） is an annually published bilingual business telephone directory for Los Angeles, San Diego, and Las Vegas, and was the first Japanese–English bilingual telephone directory published in California by Chieko Mori and later Toshihiko Takabatake. Rafu means Los Angeles in Japanese from the time Japanese people used to use Kanji to represent foreign words phonetically.

Originally, the book only covered the greater southern California area and also contained residential listings, but eventually did away with them, and in the 1998 edition, was expanded to include Las Vegas. Currently it no longer contains residential listings; however the area has been expanded to San Diego.

With an annual circulation of roughly 65,000, it has continued to maintain the highest audited circulation of any Japanese media in the United States. The Southern California business directory is divided into 600 categories with more than 1,200 advertisers and 18,000 listings.

Rafu Telephone Guide (羅府テレフォンガイド） has roughly 1,000 pages and consists of glossy full pages, area guides, maps, coupons, business directories, restaurant menus, and information. It is available with no charge at over 1,200 locations such as Japanese markets, bookstores, restaurants, hotels and schools throughout Los Angeles, Orange County, San Diego, and Las Vegas.

In addition to its various listings for businesses and other various organizations, the book contains maps and area guide of Little Tokyo and sometimes other Asian American communities as well as information for Japanese speakers living in the U.S. such as long-distance rates, maps of the U.S., sample driving tests, and other information for residing in the U.S. that is not commonly printed in Japanese.

== Awards ==
- 1994 – Yellow Pages Publishers Association (YPPA) APPY Award for Marketing Innovation – silver
- 1996 – Yellow Pages Publishers Association (YPPA) APPY Award for Innovation in Printed Materials – bronze
- 2009 – Yellow Pages Association (YPA) Directory Cover Design Award
