= Rafu =

Rafu is a Japanese word. It may refer to:

- Rafoo Chakkar, a 1977 Hindi film
- "Rafu", a 2017 Hindi song by Santanu Ghatak for the film Tumhari Sulu
- Rafu Shimpo, a Japanese-English bilingual newspaper
- Rafu Telephone Guide, a Japanese-English bilingual telephone directory
