= David Law (broadcaster) =

British sports broadcaster

David Law (born 7 September 1973) is a British sports broadcaster. He primarily commentates on tennis for BBC Radio 5 Live and BT Sport. He also presents The Tennis Podcast.

== Education ==
Law was educated at Blue Coat School, Walsall (now Blue Coat Church of England Academy), followed by the University of Loughborough. He then studied journalism at Cornwall College.

== Life and career ==
He worked as a communications manager for the ATP World Tour between 1998 and 2001.

Since 2002, he has been a reporter and commentator on tennis for BBC Radio 5 Live, commentating at the Australian Open, US Open and Wimbledon. In the 2013 US Open final, he described a 54-stroke rally between Rafael Nadal and Novak Djokovic.

He has presented The Tennis Podcast with Catherine Whitaker since 2012.

He has commentated on television on the WTA Tour for BT Sport since 2013.

As well as broadcasting, he has worked in the media department at the Queen's Club Championships since 1996, and became the tournament's Media Director in 2009.

He supports West Bromwich Albion, and is responsible for turning the tennis player Goran Ivanisevic into a fan of the club. In 2011, he took Ivanisevic to his first WBA match at Loftus Road, home of Queen's Park Rangers. In 2013, he took Ivanisevic to WBA's home ground, The Hawthorns, for a match against Manchester City.
