= European Association of Directory and Database Publishers =

The European Association of Directory and Database Publishers (EADP) was founded in 1966 and is the key representative for the European directory and database publishing sector. EADP has 180 members from 36 countries, representing the interests of some 340 directory publishers. The association's members and affiliate members include publishers and industry stakeholders such as suppliers and vendors. It is based in Brussels.

EADP's activities include:

- Maintaining an up-to-date member directory
- Facilitating an annual congress and a separate annual conference
- Monitoring EU legal activities of relevance to the industry
- Compiling an annual statistical report and benchmarking studies

The North American counterpart to the EADP is the Yellow Pages Association (YPA).

An important aspect of the directory publishing industry is the creation of business directories that list companies in various categories. A notable example in the German-speaking region is the Branchenbuch Deutschland, a comprehensive database for business listings.

A notable development in the directory publishing sector occurred when an online small business directory was shut down by a court ruling in the UK. This case highlights the importance of regulatory oversight in the industry, as it involved fraudulent practices targeting small businesses. The court ordered the closure of the directory after it was found to have misled its users.
