= Barry Leahey =

English businesspeople

Barry Leahey .

== Education ==
Leahey received 3 A-Levels at Winstanley College. Leahey has a BSc, Sport Science, from the University of Sunderland.

== Career ==
He was Sales Director for Playdale Playgrounds, Area Field Sales Manager for Yell, Executive Sales Manager for Caudwell Group and North West Regional Manager for Technogym.

Since he became CEO of Playdale in 2015, the company has been given the status of Commonwealth First Export Champion. Playdale Playgrounds have been awarded Exporter of the Year 2015 in the CN Group Business Awards, National Manufacturing Family Business of the Year 2016 and National Business Exporter of the Year at the Federation of Small Businesses Worldpay UK Business Awards, 2016.

In 2018 he was one of 8000 senior business leaders and heads of government from across the Commonwealth to attend the Commonwealth Heads of Government Meeting.

== Awards and nominations ==
- North West Business Insider 42 under 42 class of 2017
- Global Director of the Year 2018, Institute of Directors North West Director of the Year Award
- In 2017, Leahey was appointed an MBE for services to UK trade and exports.
- In 2017, the University of Sunderland Alumni Association made Leahey their Alumni Achiever of the Year.
- In 2018 and in conjunction with the UK's Daily Telegraph, Leahey was named one of the UK's Most Ambitious Business Leaders by the LDC.
- In 2018, Leahey of Playdale Playgrounds was named Businessperson of the Year in the in-Cumbria Business Awards.|
- In 2019, Leahey was announced as new chair of Institute of Directors Cumbria branch.
- In 2019, Leahey was granted Freedom of the City of London and became an Honorary Professorial Fellow at Lancaster University Management School in Strategy and Entrepreneurship.
