= YellowPagesDirectory.Com =

YellowPagesDirectory.com
- Creator: Michael Keegan
- Website: www.yellowpagesdirectory.com
- Current status: Online

YellowPagesDirectory.com is a national online telephone number and street address directory, containing Yellow Pages (business listings) and White Pages (residential listings) throughout the United States. Formerly known as YellowPagesGoesGreen.org, YellowPagesDirectory.com is owned and operated by Yellow Pages Directory Inc., which is headquartered in Manhattan, NY. The website was originally launched in 2010 by a private owner and was soon acquired by Yellow Pages Directory Inc. In addition to telephone and street address listings, the website also has informational blog articles, in addition to being outspoken advocates of opting-out of traditional print telephone directory home delivery.

== Info ==
YellowPagesDirectory.com is an online search engine and telephone directory. They encompass yellow (business) and residential (white) pages and currently feature over 28.5 million business listings throughout the United States. Users of the site are able to add, edit, and delete their Business and Residential listings.

In addition, the YellowPagesDirectory.com service states that they update their listings on a daily basis, keeping them constantly current, whereas print phone directories are only manufactured periodically and therefore do not always offer up-to-date directory information. As an example, an article published by Forbes by writer Tom Barlow entitled "Yellow Pages: No More Waste on the Stoop" touts the internet as the clear and present successor of print yellow pages; in comparison, he says, it renders phone books "as obsolete as slide rule." Another service YellowPagesDirectory.com provides for users is the ability for anyone nationwide to “opt-out” of local telephone book delivery; their website offers a portal to The Local Search Association's National Yellow Pages Consumer Choice Opt-Out Site, which allows anyone in the United States to cease delivery of phone books to their house from their local telephone carrier; a similar program in Seattle, Washington was recently responsible for the cancellation of close to a quarter of a million books since its inception, proving there is a need for an effective national opt-out service. The site also features a regularly updated Blog that primarily features articles of an environmental nature, such as organic crop growing, hybrid vehicles, and ways to avoid pollution. Since its purchase of YellowPagesDirectory.com, Yellow Pages Directory, Inc. was approved to be treated as a private S-corporation by the New York State Department of State Division of Corporation effective May 20, 2010.

== History ==
The website that would eventually become Yellowpagesgoesgreen.org originally launched in April, 2010 as InteractiveCities.com; using their lack of a print/paper-based format as a marketing tool to appeal to environmentally conscious consumers, this privately owned online business directory consisted of a basic neighborhood Yellow Pages search engine. On September 16, 2010, it was announced that InteractiveCities.com had been acquired by Yellow Pages Directory, Inc. and subsequently re-branded as Yellowpagesgoesgreen.org, with the headquarters moved to East Northport, NY.

Yellow Pages Directory, Inc. owner Michael Keegan said that he saw in the purchase the potential to cater to the growing environmentally conscious movement prevailing throughout the United States; Keegan has stated that helping the environment is something that became important to him personally as well after seeing first-hand how much waste Americans are capable of generating on a day-by-day basis.

Keegan attended Farmingdale State College and then Oakdale's Dowling College, where he graduated with a BA in Business Administration; he currently also owns a Northport-based real estate firm. Initially starting out solely as a United States Yellow Page Business Directory, YellowPagesDirectory.com later added Canadian listings in July 2012 (although these were removed a year later), in addition to Residential White Page listings in March 2013.

In June 2019, Yellow Pages Directory, Inc., the parent company of YellowpGoesGoesGreen.org, announced the re-branding of the website to reflect their corporate name in what owners stated was a bid to reduce confusion among consumers. The new headquarters is located in Manhattan, NY. The homepage was redesigned to reflect the change and a new focus on business marketing while maintaining the directory’s emphasis on environmental causes, and the majority of the YellowpGoesGoesGreen.org content was incorporated into new site's "opt out" page.
