= Fly Fishing: Memories of Angling Days =

1991 book by Michael Russell

- Cover
- Author: J. R. Hartley
- Language: English
- Genre: Fishing
- Published: 1991
- Publisher: Stanley Paul
- Publication place: United Kingdom
- ISBN: 0091751926

Fly Fishing: Memories of Angling Days, also published as Fly Fishing by J. R. Hartley, is a fishing book by British angling author Michael Russell under the pseudonym of J. R. Hartley. It was published by Stanley Paul in 1991 and was intended to capitalise on the popularity of the J. R. Hartley fictional character.

== History ==
In 1983, Yellow Pages in the United Kingdom ran a television advert featuring an elderly gentleman visiting bookshops looking for a copy of a book called Fly Fishing by J. R. Hartley. After several failed visits to shops, he finds a copy of the book using Yellow Pages and the telephone. The advert ends with the man identifying himself as the author, J. R. Hartley. As a result, several bookshops and the British Library received a large number of requests for a copy of the non-existent book.

Angling expert Michael Russell had written a book on fly fishing and chose to have it published under the name of J. R. Hartley citing the cult status of the advert. The book was published as Fly Fishing: Memories of Angling Days in 1991 by Stanley Paul. The publishers hired Norman Lumsden, who played J. R. Hartley in the advert, to promote the book as the public face of the author. Despite Russell being credited as the sole author, there have been claims that other people helped him write it. The book also featured illustrations by Patrick Benson. The book was popular and sold 130,000 copies over the Christmas period alone in the United Kingdom. As a result, it reached the top of the Christmas bestseller list in 1991.

== Reception ==
Scott Eyman of The Palm Beach Post noted the book's humor as "intensely British", though he said it struggles to maintain the joke in its second half. He described the sudden tonal shift of the book's ending, featuring a ghost and a drowning, as disconcerting, though calling the ending itself well-done. Mike Ellis, writing for the Indianapolis News, said that the book succeeds as a parody of "the tradition of genteel autobiographies about English country life". However, as a fishing book, Ellis observed that the book provides little to experienced fly fishers, "except some insight into British fly patterns and famous British trout and salmon streams". Sidney Vines, writing for The Spectator, described his experience with the book positively, and said he was unsurprised at its popularity.

== Legacy ==
The popularity of the book led to two sequels, J. R. Hartley Casts Again: More Memories of Angling Days and Golfing by J. R. Hartley. In 2011, BookFinder.com announced that Fly Fishing: Memories of Angling Days was the 17th most sought-after out-of-print book worldwide. In 2012, a bookshop in Tonbridge, Kent, was broken into by an intoxicated person who called the police and told them he was reading Fly Fishing by J. R. Hartley.
