= The Tennis Podcast =

British tennis podcast

- Language: English

Cast and voices
- Hosted by: David Law; Catherine Whitaker; Matthew Roberts

Related
- Website: www.tennispodcast.net

The Tennis Podcast is a podcast about tennis. It began production in 2012 with weekly shows throughout the year. During the four annual Grand Slam tennis tournaments – the Australian Open, French Open, Wimbledon Championships and the US Open, the podcast airs daily. It is presented by tennis broadcasters David Law, Catherine Whitaker and Matthew Roberts with discussion about recent tennis news and results, and upcoming matches and tournaments. It also features interviews, and during the pandemic it ran a series called Tennis Re-Lived in the absence of live tennis.

== Interviews ==
The podcast interviews tennis players and coaches, and other guests. Andy Murray appeared in 2016 and described his first experience of fatherhood. Football coach José Mourinho said he shed tears when Murray won Wimbledon. Former footballer David Beckham talked about how his son Romeo had quit football to play tennis. In 2019 and 2020, it featured interviews with Chris Evert, Marion Bartoli, Larry Stefanki, Janko Tipsarević and Yannick Noah. American tennis player Pam Shriver and broadcaster Mary Carillo have become frequent guests.

== Crowdfunding ==
The podcast began crowdfunding in 2017, raising £16,000 from its listeners via Kickstarter. It launched a second Kickstarter for the podcast to continue in 2018, with 571 people contributing £27,000. One of the backers paid for her ferret, Charlie, to be the podcast's mascot in 2018. In 2019, 937 people contributed £53,000. In 2020, the amount raised was £85,500 from 1,467 listeners. In 2021, the total topped £100,000 for the first time. In 2022, it moved to a subscription platform called Friends of The Tennis Podcast.

== Partners ==
The podcast is produced in partnership with the Daily Telegraph, and occasionally features their tennis writer Simon Briggs. It was sponsored by Eurosport in 2017, and Amazon Prime Video in 2018. In 2025, the podcast joined The Athletic.
