= Kendrick School =

Coordinates: 51°27′06″N 0°57′54″W

Location
- London Road; Reading, Berkshire, RG1 5BN; England

Information
- Type: Grammar school Academy
- Motto: Lead, inspire, make a difference
- Established: Refounded 1877
- Department for Education URN: 136448 Tables
- Ofsted: Reports
- Head teacher: Nicholas Simmonds
- Gender: Girls
- Age: 11 to 18
- Enrolment: 690
- Houses: Cedars, Palmer, Sidmouth
- Website: http://www.kendrick.reading.sch.uk

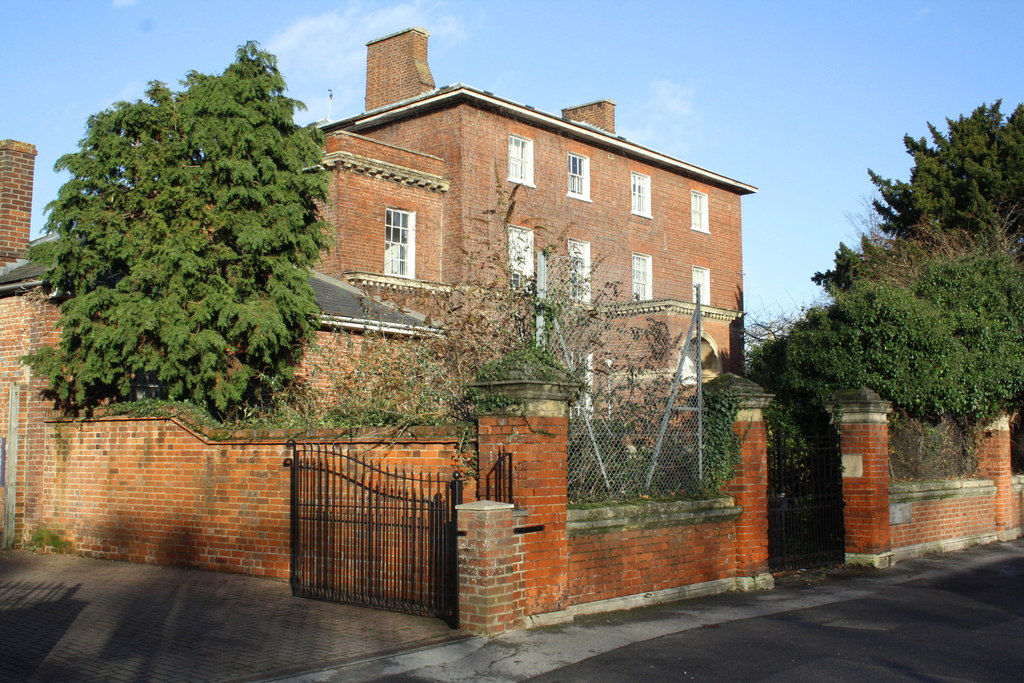
Kendrick School seen from London Road

Kendrick School is a selective girls' grammar school situated in the centre of Reading, Berkshire, UK. In February 2011, Kendrick became an Academy.

== History ==
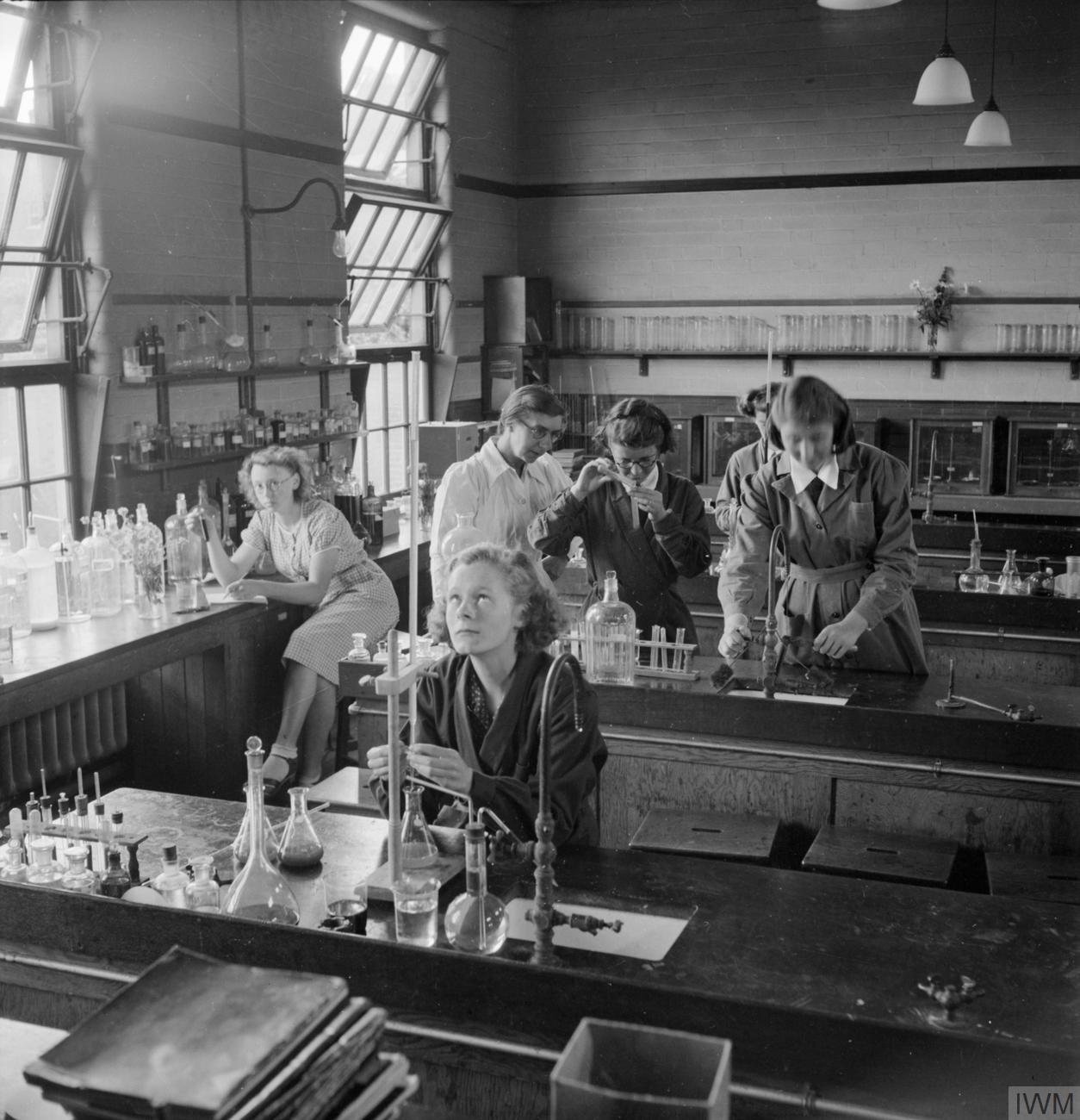
Students in the science laboratory at Kendrick in 1945

The school is named after John Kendrick, a Reading cloth merchant who died in 1624. John Kendrick left the then substantial charitable bequest of £12,500 to the towns of Reading and Newbury to provide employment and education for the poor. Initially this was used to provide a house of industry, or workhouse, called The Oracle, a name that was revived for the Oracle shopping mall which now occupies the site.

In later years the funds left by Kendrick were mismanaged and subject to legal challenge. In the 1870s this was resolved, and the remaining bequest used to found Kendrick Girls' School, along with the Kendrick Boys' School that was later to merge with Reading School. An oil painting of John Kendrick, rescued from the Oracle workhouse, still hangs in the hall at Kendrick School. The caption reads "John Kendrick, founder of this workhouse".

The school in its current form was founded in 1877 and occupied Watlington House in Watlington Street for the first 50 years of its life. In 1927, the school moved to its current site, situated on the corner of Sidmouth Street and London Road. The building is a Grade II listed building. The school was originally known as "Kendrick Girls' School" but is now called "Kendrick School".

The current Headteacher is Nicholas Simmonds. He replaced Christine Kattirtzi on the 1st September, 2026.

== Academic performance ==
Kendrick School has an outstanding Ofsted rating, and has a progress 8 score "well above national average". Pupils are selected on the basis of academic ability via an admissions test at age 11 (although entry is possible in other years too). The school was among the top five grammar schools in the UK based on GCSE performance in 2018, and in 2019.

In July 2011, Kendrick School was identified by the Sutton Trust as the fifth highest state school for proportion of higher education applicants accepted at Oxford and Cambridge Universities. The report found that 15.2% of pupils were accepted to Oxbridge and 79.4% were accepted to the highly selective Sutton Trust 30 universities over the previous three years. A 2016 report also ranked Kendrick among the top 10 state schools in Oxbridge admissions. As a state-funded school, there are no fees; as a result, it is severely over-subscribed, with over ten applicants per place.

== House system ==
The school uses the house system.

== Notable former pupils ==
- Anne Treisman, cognitive psychologist
- Beryl Cook, artist
- Chi-chi Nwanoku, musician
- Fran Williams, England Roses Netball player
- Janet Reger, lingerie designer
- Rosi Sexton, retired professional Mixed Martial Artist and first British female to fight in the UFC
- Yasmina Siadatan, winner of the BBC television series, The Apprentice in 2009.
- Jessica Swale, theatre director and playwright
- Claire Taylor, England cricketer
- Wendy Tan White, technology entrepreneur
- Catherine Whitaker, sports broadcaster

== See also ==
- The Abbey School, Reading, a girls' independent school
- Reading School, a boys' grammar school
- Reading Abbey Girls' School, a school attended by Jane Austen
