= Yell (company) =

UK marketing and directory company

Yell Group Limited
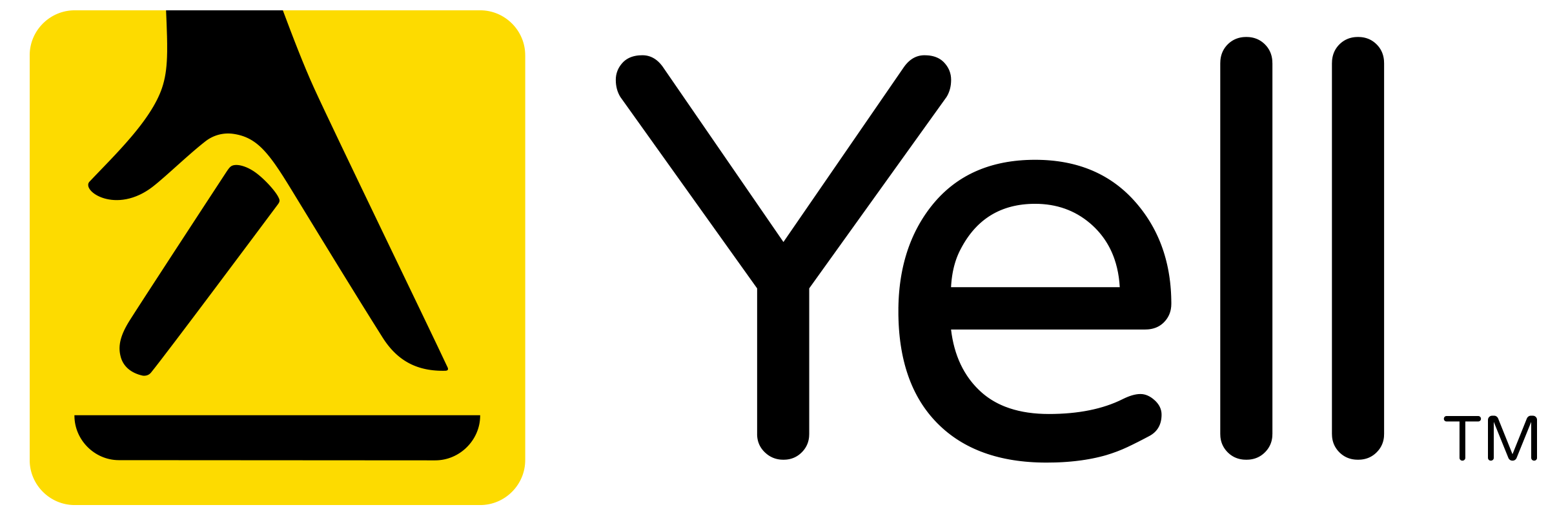
- Formerly: Hibu Group Limited
- Industry: Online Marketing
- Predecessor: British Telecom
- Founded: 1966
- Headquarters: Reading, Berkshire, United Kingdom
- Area served: United Kingdom
- Key people: Mark Clisby (Co-CEO); Luke Taylor (Co-CEO)
- Products: Yellow Pages (1966–2019); Yell.com (1996–present); Website design Google PPC; Online advertising
- Website: about.yell.com

Yell Group Limited, also known as Yell UK, is a digital marketing and online directory business in the United Kingdom. Yell has created more than 110,000 websites and managed 90,000 pay per click campaigns for customers in the United Kingdom. Yell published Yellow Pages from 1966, originally as part of the General Post Office (GPO) telephone directory, and launched its Yell.com website in 1996.

== History ==
The GPO first included Yellow Pages in its telephone directory for Brighton in 1966, expanding it throughout the UK from 1973.

Yell.com was first launched in January 1996 as the local search engine for businesses in the UK. In January 2001, Yell announced a demerger from its parent company, BT (the GPO's post-privatisation successor), abandoning a proposed stock market flotation. In May 2001, Yell was sold to venture capitalists Apax Partners and Hicks, Muse, Tate & Furst for £2.1 billion.

It was announced in April 2005 that Yell was partnering with Google to make local classified content available through Google's search engine. Yell integrated Apttus technology into its search engine to broaden its search capacity and enhance site development. Yell also expanded its offerings in 2009 to include Google Ads.

In 2006, Yell threatened Yellowikis with legal action, claiming that consumers would confuse the two organisations.

A Yell.com app was launched on the iPhone app store in 2009. The following year, Yell UK announced that it was changing its traditional Yellow Pages A4 format to a smaller size to improve usage of the directory. At that time, the directories contained an average of 54 per cent recycled fibre content.

Yell moved into their new headquarters in Reading, Berkshire, in October and Richard Hanscott was named as the company's new CEO the following year. Yell’s parent company, Yell Group, announced in 2012 that it was changing its name to Hibu UK. The company acquired Moonfruit, a DIY website company, purchased in May 2012 for £18m. On 18 August 2014, Hibu UK changed their customer-facing brand back to Yell. They re-launched with an updated range of products including websites, pay-per-click and display advertising. As of June 2015, Yell had created over 54,000 websites and managed 20,000 PPC campaigns for customers in the UK.

The company relaunched with updated websites, pay-per-click advertising and a new display advertising proposition. Glassdoor named Richard Hanscott in November 2016 to its list of “Highest Rated CEOs in the United Kingdom”. In 2017, the company announced that the publishing of Yellow Pages on paper would cease. The final edition was published in January 2019 for Brighton.

Claire Miles, formerly of Centrica, was announced as the new CEO in 2019. Florida-based private equity investment firm H.I.G. Capital acquired Yell’s sister company Hibu on 29 March 2021, including their US-based business assets.

In January 2023, Mark Clisby and Luke Taylor become Co-CEOs of Yell after Claire Miles decided to leave the company.
