= The Bear (opera) =

Opera by William Walton

- Opera by William Walton
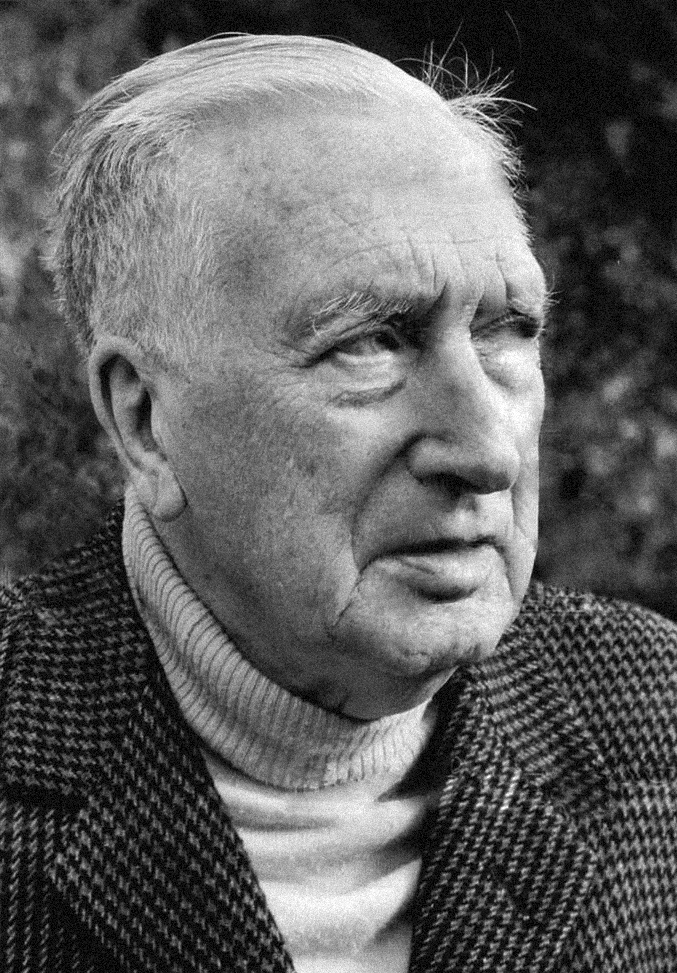
- William Walton in 1976
- Librettist: Paul Dehn and William Walton
- Language: English
- Based on: Play by Anton Chekhov
- Premiere: 3 June 1967; Jubilee Hall, Aldeburgh

The Bear is the second of the two operas by William Walton, described in publication as an "Extravaganza in One Act". The libretto was written by Paul Dehn and Walton, based on the play of the same title by Anton Chekhov (which is also sometimes translated into English as The Boor).

Walton received a commission from the Koussevitzsky Foundation in 1958, and he dedicated the opera "to the memory of Serge and Natalie Koussevitzky". He began composing in 1965 when the Aldeburgh Festival in England requested an opera from him. The Bear was first performed at the Jubilee Hall, Aldeburgh on 3 June 1967.

The opera is regarded as having "enjoyed more success and popularity than its larger-scale predecessor, Troilus and Cressida [......] because its witty parodies are in the manner of [Walton's 1922] Facade" and the librettists' ability "to emulate Chekhov's caricatures of the three main characters" are also successful.

== Synopsis ==
Place: The drawing room of Yelena Ivanovna Popova’s country house
Time: Around 1888

Popova is a widow, remaining faithful to the memory of her late husband, Popov. Her servant, Luka, remarks upon her affected sorrow. Smirnov, one of Popov's creditors, appears. During the course of the story, it becomes clear that Popov was promiscuous and unfaithful to his wife. Smirnov and Popova begin to quarrel, to the point where both aim loaded pistols at each other. However, neither can fire, as they have fallen in love. As the opera ends, Luka looks on in disbelief at the new lovers.

== Roles ==
In contrast with Walton's previous opera Troilus and Cressida, which used a large cast, full orchestra and chorus, The Bear is deliberately minimal in its vocal and instrumental forces. The opera uses 3 singers and a chamber orchestra.

Role	Voice type	Premiere Cast, 3 June 1967 (Conductor: James Lockhart)
Yelena Ivanovna Popova, a widow	mezzo-soprano	Monica Sinclair
Grigory Stepanovich Smirnov, a creditor	baritone	John Shaw
Luka, Popova's servant	bass	Norman Lumsden
The Cook	Brief speaking role	
The Groom	Brief speaking role	

== Instrumentation ==
- Woodwind
  - flute (doubling piccolo)
  - oboe (doubling English horn)
  - clarinet
  - bassoon
- Brass
  - French horn
  - trumpet
  - trombone
- Percussion
  - timpani, side drum, tenor drum, bass drum, triangle, tambourine, cymbals, suspended cymbal, gong, jingles, 3 wood blocks, whip, rattle, xylophone, vibraphone, tubular bells (in F-sharp and C), crotales, bongos
- Keyboard
  - piano
- Strings
  - first violin, second violin, viola, cello, double bass (parts may be doubled)
  - harp

== Recordings ==
- 1967: Monica Sinclair, John Shaw, Norman Lumsden; English Chamber Orchestra; James Lockhart, conductor. Audio CD: EMI Classics, Cat: ?? . Original cast recording.
- 1982: Daphne Harris, Gregory Yurisich, Noël Mangin; Melbourne Symphony Orchestra; Vanco Cavdarski, conductor (analogue recording) Audio CD: Chandos, Cat: ABR 1052.
- 1993: Della Jones, Alan Opie, John Shirley-Quirk; Northern Sinfonia; Richard Hickox, conductor. Audio CD: Chandos, Cat: #9245

== Editions ==
- 2010: A new edition of the opera was prepared by Michael Burden for the Collected Walton Edition
