= Local Search Association =

Regulating body of the US yellow pages industry

The Local Search Association, known in the industry as the LSA, is the regulating body of the United States' yellow pages industry.

Founded in 1975 as the National Yellow Pages Service Association (NYPSA), and later the Yellow Pages Association (YPA), the LSA is the largest trade organization of a print and digital media industry valued at more than $31 billion worldwide. Association members include Yellow Pages publishers, who produce products that account for almost 90 percent of the Yellow Pages revenue generated in the U.S. and Canada. Members also include the industry's international, national and local sales forces, certified marketing representatives (CMRs) and associate members, a group of industry stakeholders that include Yellow Pages advertisers, vendors and suppliers. The association has members in 29 countries.

The European counterpart to the LSA is the European Association of Directory and Database Publishers (EADP).

Recently, YPA has changed the name into Local Search Association.
