= Catherine Whitaker =

British sports reporter, presenter and commentator

Catherine Ann Whitaker (born 10 February 1986) is a British sports reporter, presenter and commentator for both television and radio. She has covered tennis and other sports for Eurosport, Amazon Prime Video UK, BBC Radio 5 Live, BeIn Sports, Perform and IMG Media. She is a co-presenter of The Tennis Podcast, a weekly podcast launched in 2012.

== Education ==
Whitaker was educated at Kendrick School in Reading and the University of Nottingham.

== Life and career ==
Since 2018, Catherine has presented the ATP, WTA and US Open tennis coverage for UK rights-holder Amazon Prime Video. She has also worked as an on-site presenter for Eurosport at the US Open, Australian Open and French Open tennis tournaments.

Since May 2012, she has co-presented The Tennis Podcast, a weekly downloadable podcast, with daily editions at the Grand Slam tennis tournaments, alongside BBC tennis commentator David Law and Matt Roberts. At Wimbledon, she has reported and commentated for BBC Radio 5 Live and BBC Television.

Earlier in her career, she was a presenter for Live at Wimbledon, the in-house TV channel produced by IMG Media for the Wimbledon tennis Championships.

Her other broadcasting roles have included commentating for WTA Media and ATP Tennis Radio, presenting the video content for the Queen's Club Championships, and she has also presented BeIN Sports’ coverage of the WTA and ATP events in Doha.

In February 2018, she presented Eurosport's coverage of the Winter Olympic Games in Pyeongchang, and later provided voiceover for the opening and closing ceremonies to the Tokyo Summer Olympics. She has also commentated on Eurosport's figure skating programming, drawing on her background in the sport in which she trained as a figure skater between the ages of 5 and 18.
