= Gandi =

Domain registrar and web hosting company

- Website type: Société par actions simplifiée
- Founded: 2000; 26 years ago
- Headquarters: Paris, {{{location_country}}}
- Area served: Worldwide
- Owner: Total Webhosting Solutions
- Founders: Pierre Beyssac; Laurent Chemla; Valentin Lacambre
- Key people: Stephan Ramoin (President)
- Services: Domain name registration Web hosting Blog hosting service Email hosting
- Revenue: €37 million (2018)
- Website: www.gandi.net

Gandi SAS (Gestion et Attribution des Noms de Domaine sur Internet – "Management and Allocation of Domain Names on the Internet") is a French company providing domain name registration, web hosting, and related services. The company's main office is in Paris.

== History ==
Gandi was founded as a domain registrar in April 2000 by Valentin Lacambre, Laurent Chemla, Pierre Beyssac and David Nahmias.

In 2005 following internal struggles in management, ownership and management of Gandi was sold to a team led by Stephan Ramoin (formerly of MultiMania/Lycos), and investors Joe White, Eirik Pettersen (co-founders of the online website building service Moonfruit), and Warren Stephens.

In 2008, Gandi launched a Xen-based VPS cloud hosting service, based on a system of "shares" and scalable resources that can be adjusted in real time.

In 2010 the company created a subsidiary in the US, opening a data center in downtown Baltimore, Phoenix, Arizona and business offices in San Francisco, California, as well as creating a customer support center in the US, which until then had been exclusively operated out of Paris, France at Place de la Nation.

In late 2011, Gandi.net was the 25th largest registrar in terms of the number of domains registered.

On 31 July 2014, Amazon Web Services partnered with Gandi and announced the ability to register domains directly through their Route 53 Service.

On 28 February 2019, Gandi CEO Stephan Ramoin announced that private equity firm Montefiore Investment had acquired the company.

In February 2023, Gandi was acquired by Total Webhosting Solutions, forming a new brand, Your.Online. In June, the company announced drastic price increases, including a new monthly fee for mailboxes previously included for free.

== Service ==
=== Domain registrar ===
Gandi is mostly known as a domain name registrar.

=== Email services ===
Gandi is also known for its "Gandi mail" offering, which includes some productivity software and allows to use open source software Roundcube as webmail interface.

== Business model ==
Gandi does not advertise, relying primarily on "word of mouth" recommendations from existing customers.

Until 2019, the company didn't distribute profits nor take debts, but reinvested all its margins in the business.

The company has a program to provide funds and/or promotion to projects and organizations that meet its criteria of "concrete", "open", and "alternative". It uses and advocates for open-source software, and since September 2010 has supported Creative Commons, providing them with free domain registrations and renewals, as well as VPS services.

Other projects that Gandi supports include (but not limited to) the Electronic Frontier Foundation, Students for Free Culture, The Spamhaus Project, Debian, Let's Encrypt, Ubuntu, GNOME, FreeBSD, Dotclear, Mageia, Paris Web, World Wide Fund for Nature, Sea Shepherd Conservation Society, VideoLAN, Adie, Canard PC, International Federation for Human Rights (FIDH), Demotix, GoodPlanet, Jamendo, In Libro Veritas, Arrêt sur Images le retour, Software Freedom Conservancy, Geeklist, FlISoL, Wikiotics, and FluxBB.
