= Blue pages =

Telephone directory of government numbers

Blue pages are a telephone directory listing of American and Canadian state agencies, government agencies, federal government and other official entities, along with specific offices, departments, or bureaus located therein.

== Canada ==
Canadian yellow-page listings indicated "Government Of Canada-See Government Listings In The Blue Pages"; in markets where the local telephone directory was a single volume, the blue pages and community information normally appeared after the alphabetical white-page listings but before the yellow pages advertising. The blue page listings included both provincial and federal entities. The Canadian government ceased publishing phone numbers for each federal department in 2015, although individual provinces and municipalities continued to give local information.

== United States ==
In the United States, the blue pages included state, federal, and local offices, including service districts such as school districts, port authorities, public utility providers, parks districts, and fire districts. Starting in 1997, the blue pages also provided information about government services, in addition to officials' names, addresses, telephone numbers, and other contact information. They were published either separately from the rest of the phone book, or consolidated into one volume, depending on the phone company and year.

Some phone books misplaced government-run businesses like Amtrak outside of the Blue pages section.

The color blue is likely derived from so-called government blue books, official publications printed by a government (such as that of a state) describing its organization, and providing a list of contact information. (The blue pages published in a printed telephone directory is usually quite abridged, compared to official blue books).

== Other ==
The name blue pages has been used for various specialised directories by private-sector entities, such as the internal IBM Staff directory.

== See also ==
- White pages
- Yellow pages
