= Hibu =

Provider of web development and hosting

Hibu Inc.
- Trade name: Hibu Inc.
- Formerly: Yellowbook Inc. (2011–2013)
- Type: Subsidiary
- Traded as: Subsidiary
- Industry: Media
- Founded: 1930
- Headquarters: Cedar Rapids, Iowa, United States
- Key people: Kevin Jasper (CEO)
- Number of employees: 1,268
- Parent: H.I.G. Capital
- Website: hibu.com

Hibu Inc. (styled hibü), formerly Yellowbook Inc., is a provider of web development and hosting, digital listings and reputation management, search engine and social media marketing, and digital advertisements. Hibu is headquartered in Cedar Rapids, IA.

== History ==
Originating as a yellow pages directory publisher, Hibu got its start as a Long Island-based company, Merchant Advertising Services Inc. in 1930. In 1996, the company formally changed its name to Yellow Book USA Inc.

British Telecommunications launched Yell.com, its UK local search engine, in 1996 and acquired YellowBook USA in 1999 for $665 million. Later, Yellow Book USA Inc. was transferred by British Telecommunications to its yellow pages subsidiary, alongside its UK yellow pages publishing business.

The Group was renamed Yell in 2000 and BT restructured in 2001 and agreed to sell the Yell directory business to private equity firms Apax Partners and Hicks, Muse, Tate & Furst (today operating in Europe as Lion Capital LLP) for £2.14 billion/$3.5 billion, making it then the largest non-corporate leveraged buyout in European history.

Yell bought McLeodUSA, one of the largest independent directory publishers in the US, for about $600 million in 2002 and floated on London's FTSE in 2003.

In May 2005, Yell announced the acquisition of TransWestern Publishing, US directory publisher. The company announced the purchase of the publisher and its holding company, TransWestern Holdings L.P., from a consortium of private equity firms (Thomas H. Lee Partners and CIVC Partners) for $1.575 billion (£829 million). The deal went through later in the year.

With the 2003 merger of McLeodUSA business and TransWestern's presence in 25 states, Yellowbook USA, Yell's subsidiary, became the fifth largest directory publisher in the United States. TransWestern had been acquired by CIVC Partners in 1993 and was used as a vehicle for additional acquisitions of smaller directories publishers in the western US. In 1997, TransWestern completed a leveraged recapitalization in which Thomas H. Lee Partners and Providence Equity Partners acquired a 60% interest in the company, with CIVC retaining a minority interest. In 2001, TransWestern acquired Texas-based WorldPages.com, Inc., a leading print and Internet yellow pages publisher listed on the New York Stock Exchange for $215 million. At the time, TransWestern was the second largest independent publisher of directories.

In April 2006, Yell agreed to purchase a 59.9% stake in Spanish phone directory firm Telefónica Publicidad e Informacion (TPI) from Telefónica, and launched a bid for the remaining shares which valued TPI at a total of £2.3 billion (€3.3 billion; US$4.1bn). Since then, Yell has bought further capital and in September 2007 reached agreement with the minority shareholders to acquire the remaining 1.28% of what was then named Yell Publicidad (now named Hibu Connect S.A.U., operating under the name Páginas Amarillas España). In July 2006, Yell threatened Yellowikis with legal action, claiming that people will confuse the two organisations. In 2008, Yell Group purchased the Pindar Set business and renamed it Yell Adworks.

In May 2009, Yell UK announced an alliance with Google to provide search marketing services to small businesses, followed by Yell Publicidad in January 2010. In June 2009, Yell Group announced the appointment of Bob Wigley as Chairman, following the announcement in May 2009, that existing chairman Bob Scott would step down. In September 2009, Yell's US arm, Yellowbook, acquired Texas and Louisiana assets of ypOne Publishing, the 10th largest independent yellow pages publisher in the US. Yell announced the completion of its refinancing in November 2009, as first announced in June 2009 and updated in September the same year.

In February 2010, Yell UK announced the first major redesign in forty years of the traditional Yellow Pages directories into a smaller compact size rather than the traditional A4 format.

In May 2010, Yell Group purchased TrustedPlaces, a user-contributed local review site, and its US arm Yellowbook, announced the launch of a new group buying website called Weforia.com in August 2010.

In 2011, Yellow Book USA changed its name to Yellowbook Inc.

In July 2011, Yell announced the acquisition of Znode, the privately owned multi-store ecommerce company and strategic alliances on digital services for small businesses with both Microsoft and Bazaarvoice. On 14 July, Yell announced a four-year plan to move away from traditional print and online advertising and focus on providing a broader range of digital services for both small businesses and consumers.

In September 2011, Yell announced an alliance with mobile platform company Netbiscuits.

In 2011 the company reported spending £160 million on interest payments and incurring losses of £1.4 billion.

In May 2012, Yell announced that it was changing its name to Hibu, pronounced "high-boo". The company's shareholders approved the change of name at its annual general meeting held on 27 July 2012, and the new name became effective from 30 July 2012.

The company continued to acquire additional companies, with Moonfruit, a DIY website company, purchased in May 2012 for £18m.

In September 2012, it warned that it is working with a number of capital options that which may attribute little or no value to the group's ordinary shares, it also warned profits would miss forecasts owing to the ongoing decline of its directory business.

On 18 August 2014, Hibu UK changed their customer-facing brand back to Yell. They re-launched with an updated range of products including websites, pay-per-click and display advertising. As of June 2015, Yell has created over 54,000 websites and managed 20,000 PPC campaigns for customers in the UK.

In 2021, private equity investment firm H.I.G. Capital acquired Hibu Inc. from Hibu Group Limited (now Yell Group Limited). Following that transaction, Hibu Group Limited changed its name back to Yell Group Limited.

In August 2024, Hibu Inc. acquired RevLocal, a Columbus, Ohio–based firm specializing in digital marketing strategies for local, small- and medium-sized businesses as well as for multi-location regional and national brands. The deal represents a notable extension in Hibu’s targeted reach within the broader small business marketplace.

== Operations ==
The company operates in the digital marketing space within the US, providing digital marketing and advertising to small- and medium-sized businesses. Hibu is headquartered in Cedar Rapids, Iowa with another operations hub in King of Prussia, Pennsylvania.
