= Moonfruit =

Website development service

Moonfruit Limited
- Type: Private company
- Industry: Web hosting service
- Founded: 1999
- Headquarters: London, England, UK
- Products: Web services
- Parent: Yell (company)
- Subsidiaries: SiteMaker Software Limited
- Website: www.moonfruit.com

Moonfruit was a UK-based company that offered a website building service.

== History ==
Moonfruit was launched in January 2000 during the dot-com bubble, and was supported entirely by advertisements. When the bubble burst, it became a subscription-based service. Later, the company was bought out by its London-based staff. The service is now in its sixth version, including a French language version, with further languages to follow. In April 2011, over 3.5 million websites had been built using Moonfruit's point-and-click interface and drag-and-drop templates. By the end of 2011 over 4.4 million were created with another 1.2 million in 2012, bringing the total to 5.66 million websites by the end of 2012.

SiteMaker is a reseller of domain registrar Gandi so SiteMaker customers can register domains for their sites, in return Gandi offers SiteMaker as an option to its customers in addition to its own website builder.

Turnover reached $1.9m in 2009, before shooting up to nearly $4m in 2010, with its SiteMaker subsidiary making a loss of £1.26m in 2011.

On 16 May 2012, Yell (the British Yellow Pages publisher) acquired Moonfruit in a deal worth £23 million.

In 2013 Moonfruit's Flash-based platform was adapted to render sites in the HTML 5 format to enable website presentation on devices not supporting Flash, such as iPhones and iPads. The HTML 5 rendering engine continues to be improved with new features and improvements including e-commerce, blog page and social platform integration. Moonfruit user created websites that are facilitated by the new build of Moonfruit can be viewed at the non-affiliated Moonfruit Directory.

On 8 August 2016 Moonfruit announced that they would cease to offer free websites. The owners of free Moonfruit websites could upgrade to a paid subscription, failing which their websites would be deleted after 90 days.

In 2021, Moonfruit announced that the platform will be decommissioned on 7 December 2021.

== Twitter ==
In June 2009 Moonfruit began a promotional campaign using Twitter. In celebration of their 10th birthday, they offered Twitter users the chance to win an Apple MacBook Pro by tweeting their tag, "#moonfruit". One MacBook would be given away each day for 10 days to a random participant who had used the tag. This campaign was successful enough to keep the #moonfruit tag at the top of the trending topics for an entire week and garnered some media attention.

== See also ==
- Website builder
