= Yellowikis =

Former wiki on businesses

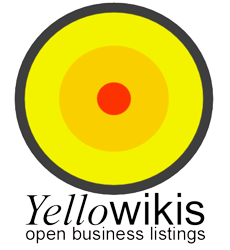
- Website type: MediaWiki
- Owner: Wikia
- Website: yellowikis.wikia.com
- Registration: Optional
- Launched: January 2005
- Current status: Inactive

Yellowikis was a MediaWiki website collecting basic information about businesses. This information included basic contact details such as company name, address, websites, and telephone numbers, as well as internal Yellowiki wikilinks to competitors. Yellowikis was launched in January 2005. As of March 2011, the main page of Yellowikis had been translated into more than twenty five different languages.

Some users also entered a number of codes, including the two letter country code, as well as an International Standard Industrial Classification, North American Industry Classification or US Standard Industrial Classification. Some users are also adding geocodes, and Skype IDs.

== Legal Issues ==
Commercial business listing company Yell Limited requested that the founders of Yellowikis, Paul Youlten and Rosa Blaus, amend their site, claiming that Yellowikis was "passing itself off" as being associated with Yell.com and that people would confuse the two organisations. This was in July 2006.

This might be considered to be anti-competitive behaviour in the eyes of certain commentators, however, such claims are unlikely to carry any water from any legal perspective.

Yell's claim is given considerable weight by the slogan on Yellowiki's front page that they are "Yellow Pages for the 21st Century" although in their public protestations, Yellowikis claimed that they were not trying to create an association between themselves and Yellow Pages. Yellow Pages is a registered trade mark in many countries, including the United Kingdom.

In some territories, however, the mark has lost its distinctiveness as a source of origin of goods and services. From 9 to 14 October 2006, the domain address redirected to the new Owikis website, which stated "the trademark dispute between Yell Limited and Paul Youlten, concerning the Yellowikis website, has been satisfactorily resolved."

The Yellowikis website reappeared on 15 October 2006 with the explanation that United Kingdom users would have to use Owikis, without the "Yell" in the domain name and without the colour yellow in the logo. International users could continue to use Yellowikis. As of September 2026, the Owikis site is not yet available. As of May 2014, the main page is dead.
