= Yellow pages =

Telephone directory of businesses

Yellow Pages
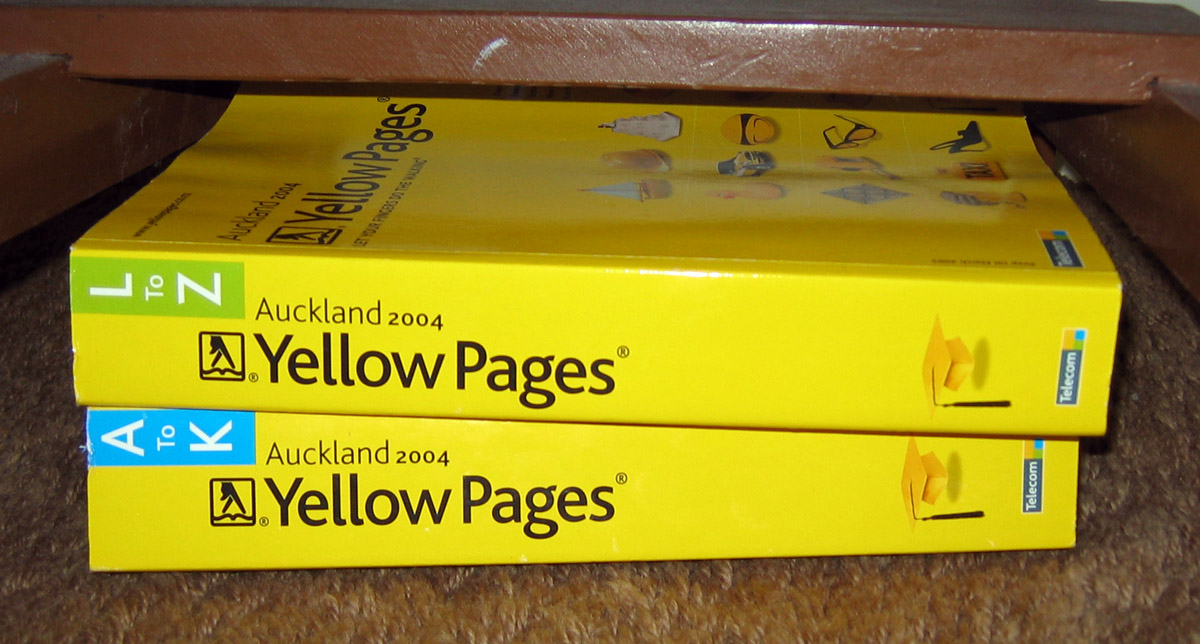
- 2004 Yellow Pages for Auckland, New Zealand
- Parent: Various (United States), Yell (United Kingdom); Yellow Pages Limited (Canada), Directories Philippines Corporation (Philippines)
- Categories: Business directory
- Frequency: Yearly
- Publisher: Various (United States), Yell (United Kingdom); Bell Canada (Canada), Directories Philippines Corporation (Philippines)
- Founded: 1886; 140 years ago
- First issue: 1886
- Final issue: 2019 (United Kingdom)
- Country: United States; United Kingdom; Australia; Canada; New Zealand; Philippines
- Based in: Various
- Language: English

The yellow pages are telephone directories of businesses, organized by category rather than alphabetically by business name, in which advertising is sold. The directories were originally printed on yellow paper, as opposed to white pages where all telephone subscribers are listed alphabetically by name. The traditional term "yellow pages" is now also applied to online directories of businesses.

In many countries, including Canada, the United Kingdom, Australia, and elsewhere, "Yellow Pages" (or any applicable local translations), as well as the "Walking Fingers" logo introduced in the 1970s by the Bell System–era AT&T, are registered trademarks, though the owner varies from country to country, usually being held by the main national telephone company (or a subsidiary or spinoff thereof). However, in the United States, neither the name nor the logo were registered as trademarks by AT&T, and they are freely used by several publishers.

== History ==
The name and concept of "yellow pages" came about in 1883, when a printer in Cheyenne, Wyoming, United States, working on a regular telephone directory, ran out of white paper so they used yellow paper instead. In 1886, Reuben H. Donnelley created the first official Yellow Pages directory for the city of Chicago.

Today, the expression yellow pages is used globally in both English-speaking and non-English speaking countries. In the United States, it refers to the category, while in some other countries it is a registered name and therefore a proper noun. The term Yellow Pages is not a registered name within the United States and is freely used by many companies. Telephone directories using the Internet domain name "yellowpages.cc" (where cc is the ccTLD) exist in 75 countries. They are edited by many different phone companies and directory publishers, mostly independently.

A particular yellow pages is a print directory which provides an alphabetical listing of businesses within a specific geographical area (e.g. the Tampa Bay area), which are segregated under headings for similar types of businesses, such as plumbers. Traditionally, these directories have been published by the local phone company, but there are numerous independent directory publishers. Some yellow pages publishers focus on a particular demographic (e.g. Christian yellow pages or business pages).

Yellow pages directories are usually published annually and distributed for free to all residences and businesses within a given coverage area. The majority of listings are plain and in small black text. The yellow-pages publishers profit by selling advertising space or listings under each heading. Advertising may be sold by a direct sales force or by approved agencies (CMR's). Available advertising space varies among publishers and ranges from bold names up to four color twin page ads ("double trucks").

In the United States, the predominant yellow pages are DEX One's DEX, the AT&T Real Yellow Pages, Yellowbook, and the Superpages.

Yellowbook Logo used in the United States

Business listings used for publication are obtained by several methods. Local phone companies that publish yellow pages directories rely on their own customer lists and include business listings that are provided by incumbent local exchange carriers (ILECs).

Advertising in yellow pages directories requires payment in full prior to printing or may be billed monthly over the life of the contract, which is usually 12 months. Typically, sales representatives help customers to design their ads and provide a proof copy for review and approval.

Yellow pages' print usage is reported to be declining with both advertisers and shoppers increasingly turning to Internet search engines and online directories. According to a study by Knowledge Networks/SRI, in 2007, print yellow pages were referenced 13.4 billion times, while Internet yellow pages references increased to 3.8 billion, up from 2006's 3.3 billion online searches.

Archived yellow pages and telephone directories are important tools in local historical research and trademark litigation.

== Logo ==
Canadian yellow pages logo

The "Walking Fingers" logo was created by Henry Alexander, a New England artist. After graduating from the Swain School of Design in New Bedford, Massachusetts, Alexander began a freelance career as an illustrator and commercial designer. He formed a long association with the New England Telephone Company lasting thirty-one years. In 1962, he designed the "walking fingers" logo and within a year it became the national trademark for their yellow pages.

AT&T, the creator and owner of the most famous three-fingered version of the "Walking Fingers" logo, never applied for a trademark on the logo. While they eventually received a trademark on a different version of the logo, the version with the three fingers was not considered by AT&T to be proprietary and they in fact allowed any telephone directory to use it. Throughout the 1970s, many television ads showed a disembodied hand "walking" across an open copy of the Yellow Pages, with the slogan "Let Your Fingers Do the Walking."

The Bell System later applied for a trademark on the logo but had its application denied on the grounds that it "had become a generic indicator of the yellow pages without regard to any particular source." For a time in the late 1990s, the Yellow Pages Publishing Association began using a trademarkable logo with a lightbulb instead of the walking fingers (with the slogan "Get an idea") as part of an ad campaign featuring Jon Lovitz, intended to portray the Yellow Pages as a consumer resource that would give customers ideas as opposed to simply being a telephone directory; the end of these ads showed the walking fingers reaching down and grabbing a lightbulb from within the pages beneath. The walking fingers logo returned two years later.

In some countries, the familiar "walking fingers" logo is not protected as a trademark and may be used by anyone. This logo is used in varying forms by almost every yellow pages publisher; however, there are companies that use it to imitate mainstream publishers. In Belgium, the Republic of Ireland, Israel and the Netherlands the directory, although using the yellow pages logo, is called "Golden Pages".

== Internet yellow pages ==
Online business directories are branded as IYP or Internet yellow pages. On a broader scale, they can be classified as vertical directories. There are consumer oriented and business oriented varieties. Independent ad agencies or Internet marketing consultants can assist business owners in determining sound opportunities for yellow pages advertising and provide objective information on usage, possession and preferences.

According to several reports, the search term "yellow pages" was among the five highest revenue-generating search terms in Google's AdWords program in 2010. Experian/Hitwise reported in January 2011 that the search term "yellow pages" was one of the top 50 search terms across all search engines and all search terms (millions of search terms). This made "yellow pages" one of the most searched-for things on the Internet in 2011.

The Yellow Pages Association said in February 2011 that 75 percent of adults in the United States still used print yellow pages and that for every $1 in investment, businesses returned $15.

IYP offers listings differently from standard search engines. Where search engines return results based on relevance to the true search term, IYP returns results based on a geographic area.

IYP is classified as a local search directory which provides content with the added ability to refine the search to find the needed service. The search engine prioritizes local businesses in its results rather than the results being dominated by regional or national companies. All services offer paid advertising options which typically offer preferred placement on search results pages.

== Environmental concerns ==
In later years, the yellow pages industry faced scrutiny from environmentalist groups who claim printed yellow pages are a wasteful resource, citing statistics that by 2011 nearly 70% of all Americans rarely or never used printed phone directories. In other results, approximately 58% of working U.S. adults said they used phone books at home, work, or both, according to a 2013 survey by RingCentral that appeared in USA Today.

The Product Stewardship Institute claims local governments spend $54 million a year to dispose of unwanted phone books and $9 million to recycle them. Phone books use low-grade glues and are therefore difficult to recycle, and they often clog recycling machinery. Conversely, publishers note that phone book directories are 100% recyclable and are made using soy-based and non-toxic inks, glues, and dyes.

In 2011, San Francisco became the first city in the United States to restrict yellow page distribution to people who opt in, but was being sued in federal court by the Local Search Association on freedom of speech grounds. According to the Sierra Club, 1.6 million phone books were distributed annually in San Francisco, producing 3,600 tons of waste, $1 million in disposal costs, and 6,180 metric tons of carbon dioxide emissions. In 2013, the San Francisco Board of Supervisors passed, and the Mayor signed, an ordinance that repealed the Yellow Pages Distribution Pilot Program (Ordinance 130186).

Also in 2011, the Yellow Pages Association and the Association of Directory Publishers started the yellowpagesoptout.com Web site allowing anyone in the United States to choose not to receive directories. The site remains active as of 2025.

The 2009 Environmental Protection Agency (EPA) Municipal Solid Waste report classified directories as the smallest contributor of paper and paperboard products to the solid waste stream, representing only 0.3% – significantly less than all other paper product categories such as newspapers, magazines and books. In 2010, the EPA stopped measuring directories separately from newspapers, indicating the minor impact of directories on municipal waste.

Yellow Pages publishers' paper usage declined by nearly 60% between 2007–2012, and were projected to continue declining through 2013, according to the Pulp and Paper Products Council. The EPA's 2011 Municipal Waste report showed that approximately 73% of phone directory, newspaper, and mechanical papers were recycled.

== Decline of print directories ==
In September 2017, Yell, the publisher of Yellow Pages in the United Kingdom, announced that the business would be fully digitized from January 2019, ending the publication's 51-year run. The last UK copies were posted out on 18 January 2019.

The Irish publisher of the Golden Pages moved to an online-only model in 2017 after exiting examinership. The equivalent "Independent Directory" (similar to the UK's Thomson Local directories) produced by Independent News & Media ceased publication in 2009.

== See also ==
- Loren M. Berry, a pioneer in the industry
- Blue pages – government-related counterpart
- Electronic Yellow Pages
- Telecommunications service
- Telephone directory (white pages) – residential, non-commercial counterpart of the yellow pages
- Yellowikis
