= Telephone directory =

Book that lists phone numbers of people and businesses

Part of the telephone directory of Singapore, 2013

A telephone directory, commonly called a telephone book, telephone address book or phonebook, is a listing of telephone subscribers in a geographical area or subscribers to services provided by the organization that publishes the directory. Its purpose is to allow the telephone number of a subscriber identified by name and address to be found. It may include a 'yellow pages' section that list businesses by type, architects, beauticians, carpenters, etc., or the Yellow pages may be provided as a separate volume. The slogan "Let Your Fingers Do the Walking", introduced by the Bell System, refers to use of Yellow Pages phone books.

The advent of the Internet, search engines, and smartphones in the 21st century greatly reduced the need for a paper phone book. Some communities, such as Seattle and San Francisco, sought to ban their unsolicited distribution as wasteful, unwanted and harmful to the environment.

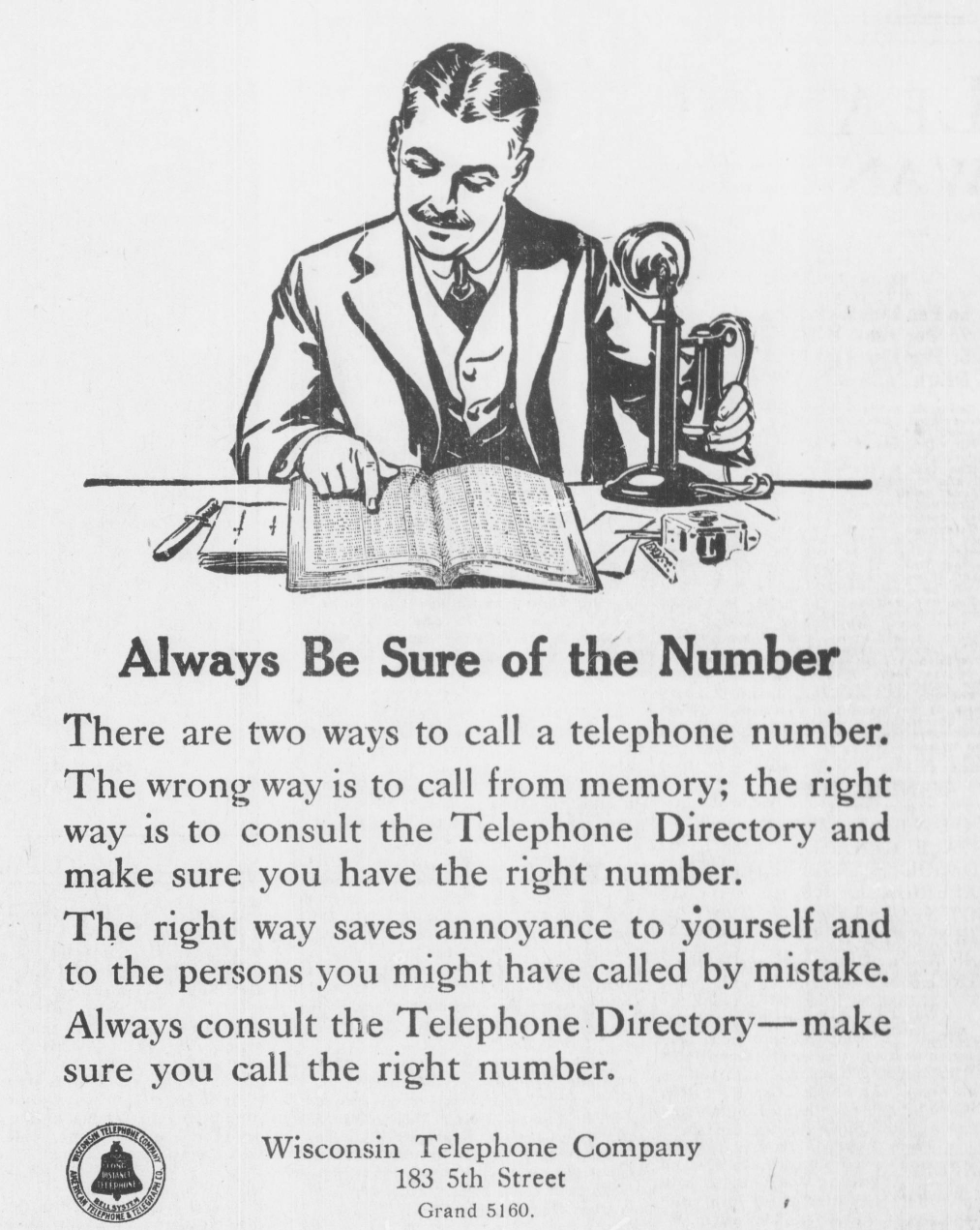
"Always Be Sure of the Number" - 1916 advertisement

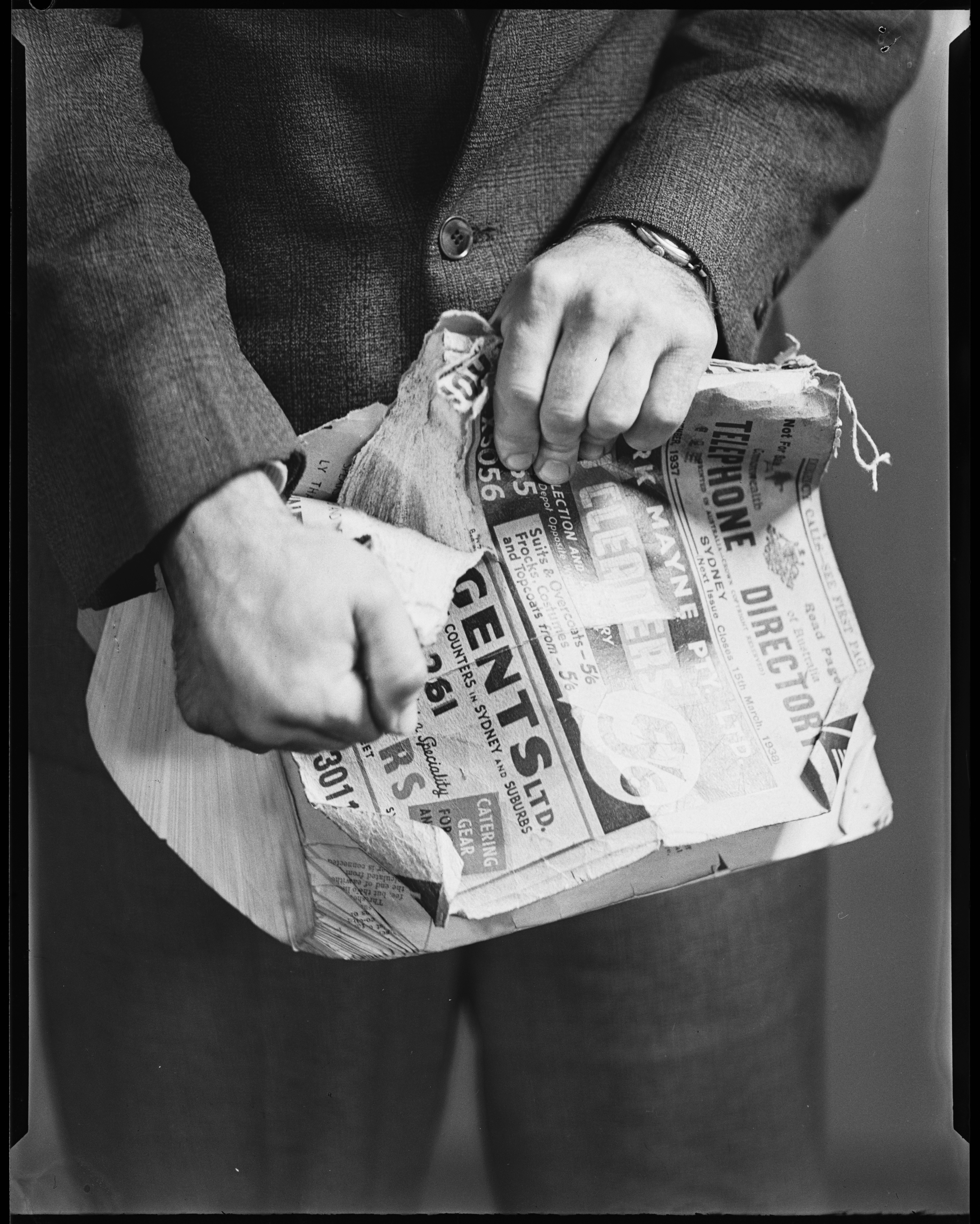
Tearing a telephone directory was once a popular feat of strength, 1938

== Content ==
Subscriber names are generally listed in alphabetical order, together with their postal or street address and telephone number. Typically, every subscriber in the geographical coverage area is listed, unless the subscriber requests the exclusion of their number from the directory, often for a fee. Their number is then said to be "unlisted" (US and Canada), "ex-directory" (British English), or "private" (Australia and New Zealand).

A telephone directory may also provide instructions: how to use the telephone service, how to dial a particular number, be it local or international, what numbers to access important and emergency services, utilities, hospitals, doctors, and organizations who can provide support in times of crisis. It may also have civil defense, emergency management, or first aid information. There may be transit maps, postal code/zip code guides, international dialing codes or stadium seating charts, as well as advertising.

In the US, under current rules and practices, mobile phone and voice over IP listings are not included in telephone directories. Efforts to create cellular directories have met stiff opposition from several fronts, including those who seek to avoid telemarketers.

== Types ==
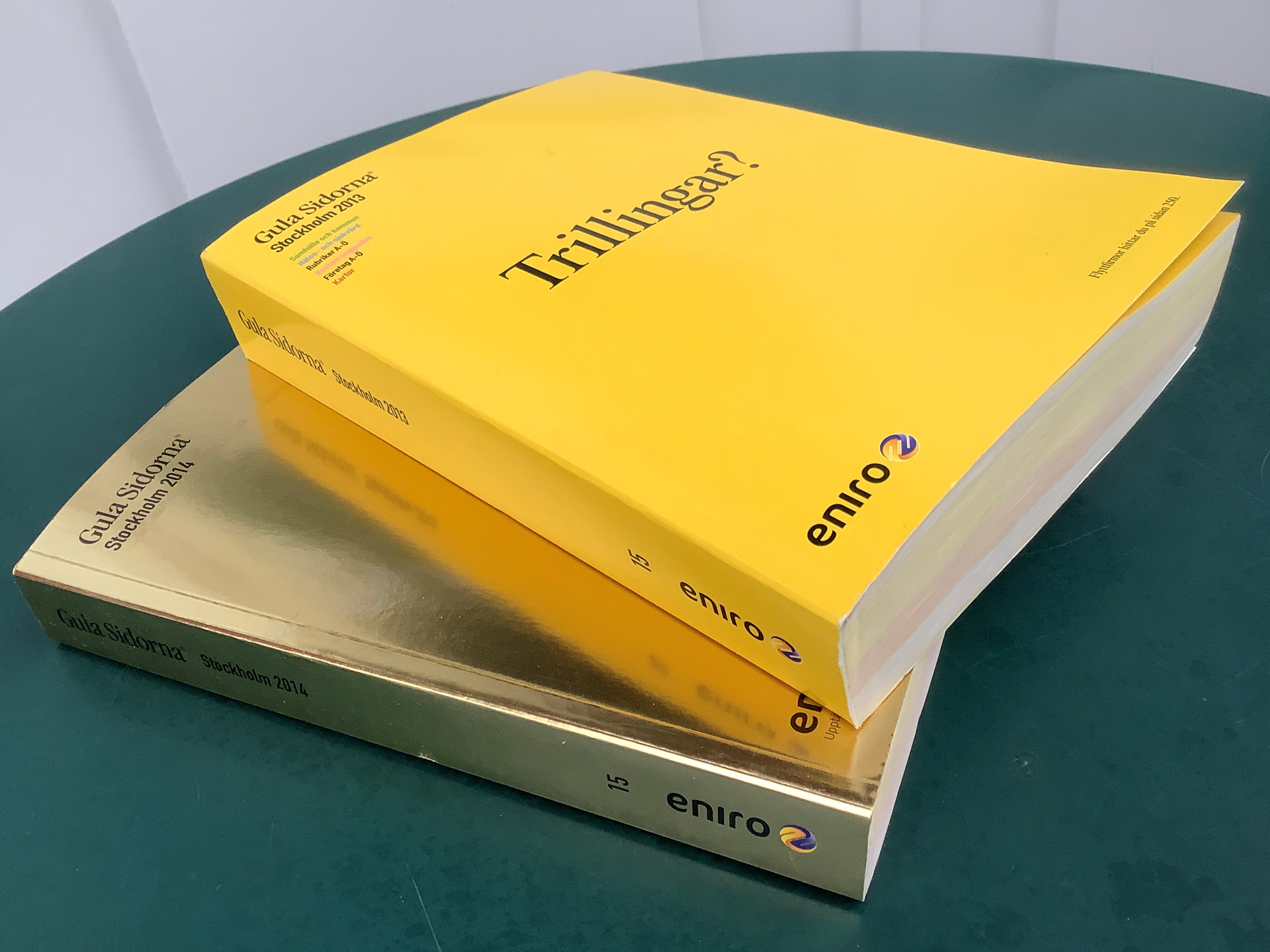
Separate yellow and white pages volumes from Stockholm

A telephone directory and its content may be known by the colour of the paper it is printed on.

- White pages generally indicates alphabetic listings of individuals and businesses.
- Yellow pages, golden pages, A2Z, or classified directory is usually a "business directory", where businesses are listed alphabetically within each of many classifications (e.g., "lawyers"). A basic listing was in small type, but many business would pay for a display ad, available in different sizes, to get the attention of potential customers.
- Grey pages, sometimes called a "reverse telephone directory", allowing subscriber details to be found for a given number. These listings are often published separately, in a city directory, or under another name, for a price, and made available to commercial and government agencies. Not available in all jurisdictions; they may contravene data protection legislation.

Other colors may have other meanings; for example, information on government agencies is often printed on blue pages or green pages.

== Publication ==
Telephone directories can be published in hard copy or, more recently, in electronic form. In the latter case, the directory can be on physical media such as CD-ROM, or using an online service through proprietary terminals or over the Internet.

In many countries, directories are both published in book form and also available over the Internet. Printed directories were usually supplied free of charge.

=== CD ROM ===
Selectphone (ProCD) Inc.) and PhoneDisc (Digital Directory Assistance Inc) were among the earliest such products. These were not a matter of a single click: PhoneDisc, depending on the mix of Residential, Business or both, involved up to eight CD-ROMs. SelectPhone is fewer CD-ROMs: five.

Both provide a reverse lookup feature (by phone number or by address), albeit involving up to five CD-ROMs.

=== Internet ===
The combination of phone number lookups, along with Internet access, was offered by some service providers; VoIP (Voice over IP) was an additional feature.

== History ==
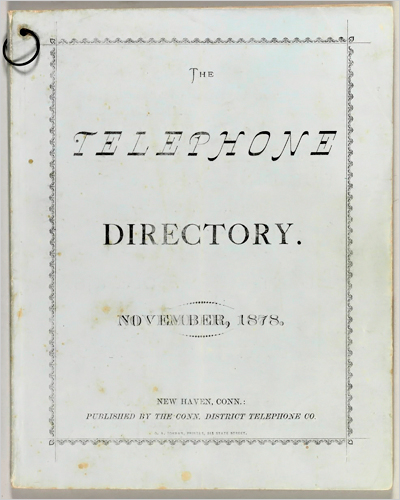
The first telephone directory, printed in New Haven, Connecticut, United States, in November 1878

Telephone directories are a type of city directory. Books listing the inhabitants of an entire city were widely published starting in the 18th century, before the invention of the telephone.

The first telephone directory, consisting of a single piece of cardboard, was issued on 21 February 1878; it listed 50 individuals, businesses, and other offices in New Haven, Connecticut, that had telephones. The directory was not alphabetized and no numbers were included with the people listed in it. In 1879, Dr. Moses Greeley Parker suggested the format of the telephone directory be changed so that subscribers appeared in alphabetical order and each telephone be identified with a number. Parker came to this idea out of fear that Lowell, Massachusetts's four operators would contract measles and be unable to connect telephone subscribers to one another.

The first British telephone directory was published on 15 January 1880 by The Telephone Company. It contained 248 names and addresses of individuals and businesses in London; telephone numbers were not used at the time as subscribers were asked for by name at the exchange. The directory is preserved as part of the British phone book collection by BT Archives.

The Reuben H. Donnelly company asserts that it published the first classified directory, or yellow pages, for Chicago, Illinois, in 1886.

In 1938, AT&T commissioned the creation of a new typeface, known as Bell Gothic, the purpose of which was to be readable at very small font sizes when printed on newsprint where small imperfections were common.

In 1981, France became the first country to have an electronic directory on a system called Minitel. The directory is called "11" after its telephone access number.

In 1991, the U.S. Supreme Court ruled (in Feist v. Rural) that telephone companies do not have a copyright on telephone listings, because copyright protects creativity and not the mere labor of collecting existing information.

=== Web directories and cell phones ===
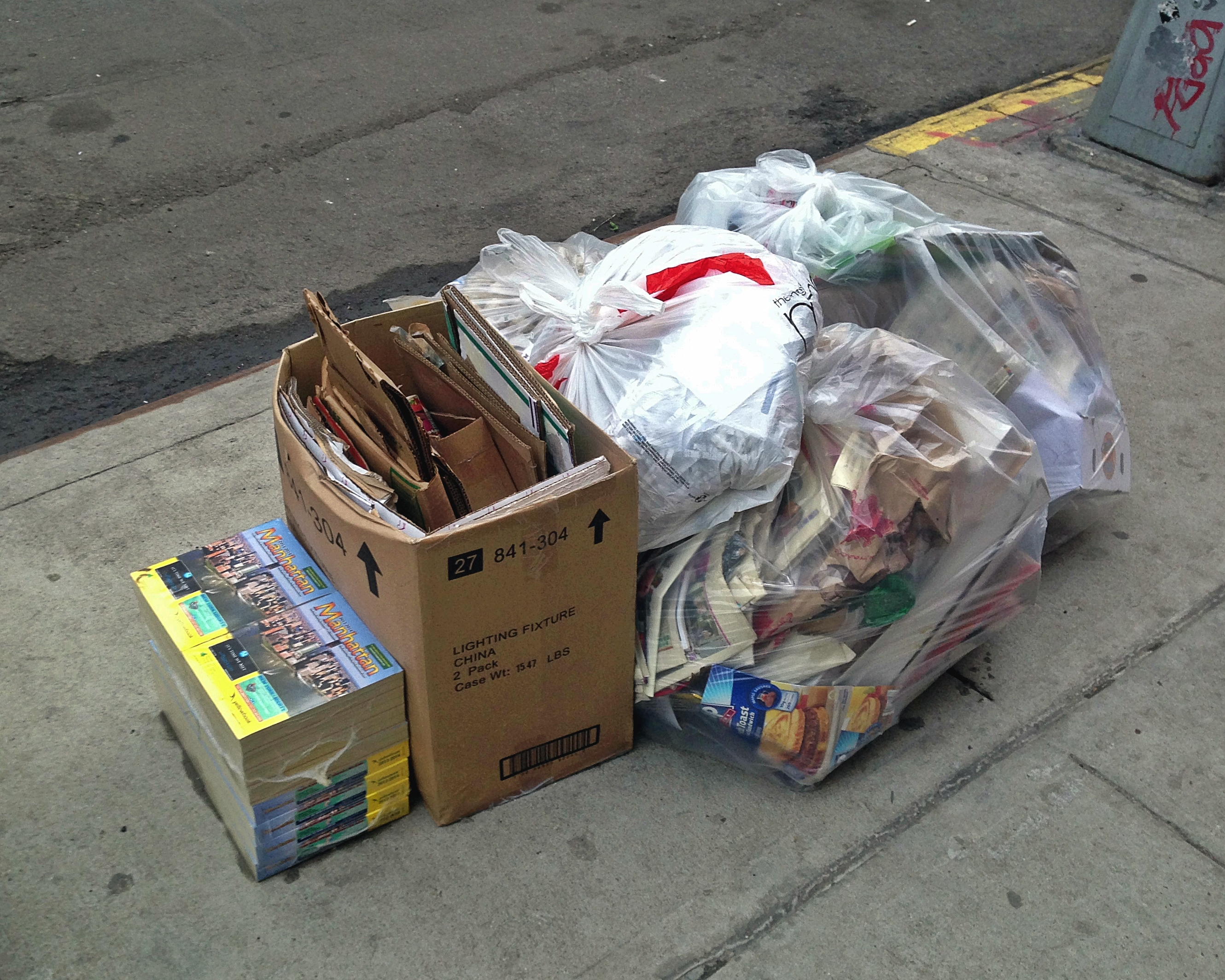
A bundle of phone books in the trash, unopened

In late July 1995 Kapitol launched the Infobel.be website. Infobel was then the first telephone directory website launched on the then-nascent Internet. In 1996, the first US phone directories went online, including Yellowpages.com and Whitepages.com, both of which launched in April of that year. In 1999, the first online telephone directories and people-finding sites such as LookupUK.com went online in the UK. In 2003, more advanced UK searching including Electoral Roll became available on LocateFirst.com.

With more and more web directories of people, and with many people giving up landlines for cell phones whose numbers were generally not listed in telephone directories, printed directories are no longer as necessary as they once were. Regulators no longer required that residential listings be printed, starting with New York in 2010. Yellow pages continued to be printed because some advertisers still reached consumers that way.

In the 21st century, printed telephone directories are increasingly criticized as waste. In 2012, after some North American cities passed laws banning the distribution of telephone books, an industry group sued and obtained a court ruling permitting the distribution to continue. In 2010, manufacture and distribution of telephone directories produced over 1,400,000 metric tons of greenhouse gases and consumed over 600,000 tons of paper annually.

== Reverse directories ==
A reverse telephone directory is sorted by phone number, so the name and address of a subscriber is looked up by phone number.

== See also ==
- Rafu Telephone Guide
- City directory
