= John Holmes =

John or Jon Holmes may refer to:

== People ==
=== Arts and entertainment ===
- John Holmes (actor) (1944–1988), American pornographic actor and murder suspect
- John Holmes (composer) (died 1629), English musician and composer
- John Holmes (poet) (1904–1962), American poet
- John Clellon Holmes (1926–1988), American Beat poet, novelist and essayist
- John Eric Holmes (1930–2010), American author and promoter of fantasy role-playing games
- John W. Holmes (film editor) (1917–2001), American film editor
- John Holmes (radio presenter) MBE, associated with BBC Radio 4 and BBC Radio Nottingham
- Jon Holmes (born 1973), British comedy writer and broadcaster

=== Diplomacy ===
- John Holmes (British diplomat) (born 1951), British diplomat
- John T. Holmes, Canadian ambassador to Indonesia and East Timor
- John Wendell Holmes (1910–1988), Canadian diplomat and academic

=== Education ===
- John Holmes (geographer), Australian professor of geography
- John Holmes (schoolmaster) (1703–1760), English schoolmaster
- John Clough Holmes (1809–1887), American merchant; Agricultural College of the State of Michigan progenitor

=== Military or mercenary service ===
- John Holmes (British Army officer) (born 1949), British general
- John Holmes (mercenary), 19th century Anglo-Indian mercenary
- John Holmes (Royal Navy officer) (1640?–1683), English naval officer

=== Politics ===
- John Holmes (by 1529 – 1583), MP for Ripon and Boroughbridge
- John Holmes (died 1556 or later), MP for Rye
- John Holmes (Maine politician) (1773–1843), member of U.S. Senate and U.S. House of Representatives
- John Holmes (New Zealand politician) (1831–1910), New Zealand Member of Parliament
- John Holmes (Nova Scotia politician) (1789–1876), Canadian Senator
- John Holmes (Ontario politician) (1828–1879), Canadian MP
- John Bee Holmes (1760–1827), intendant (mayor) of Charleston, South Carolina
- John Edwin Holmes (1809–1863), first Lieutenant Governor of Wisconsin
- John Robert Holmes (1927–2011), Canadian MP
- John Holmes (Jamaican politician) (1763–1836), planter, slave-owner and member of the House of Assembly of Jamaica

=== Religion ===
- John Holmes (bishop) (died 1904), Anglican colonial bishop
- John Haynes Holmes (1879–1964), American churchman and pacifist
- John McClellan Holmes (1834–1911), Christian minister and author

=== Sports ===
- John Holmes (footballer) (1869–?), English footballer
- John Holmes (cricketer) (Rodney Holmes, 1924–1980), English cricketer
- Johnny Holmes, American baseball player of the 1940s
- John Holmes (rugby league) (1952–2009), English former rugby league footballer
- John Holmes (rugby league, born 1904) (1904–1931), Australian rugby league player
- John Holmes (golfer) (JB Holmes, born 1982), American golfer
- John Holmes (American football) (born 1953), American football player

=== Other fields ===
- John Holmes (antiquary) (1800–1854), English antiquarian
- John Holmes (essayist) (1815–1894), radical campaigner
- John Holmes (Messenger of the Plymouth Court) (1603–?), Plymouth Colony settler and official
- John Henry Holmes (1857–1935), English electrical engineer, inventor and Quaker
- John Dalrymple Edgar Holmes (1867–1915), British veterinary scientist and bacteriologist
- John M. Holmes (died 1933), alleged murderer lynched in San Jose, California

== Fictional characters ==
- John Hamish Adler Holme or Auguste Lupa, a fictional character in novels by John Lescroart

== See also ==
- John Holm (disambiguation)
- Jack Holmes (disambiguation)
- Jonathan Holmes (disambiguation)
