= Jack Holmes =

Jack Holmes may refer to:

- Jack Holmes (rugby league, born 1904) (1904–1931), Australian rugby league footballer of the 1920s and 1930s
- Jack Holmes (rugby league, born 1994), rugby league footballer of the 2010s
- Jack Holmes (cricketer) (1899–1950), English cricketer
- Jack Holmes (American football) (born 1953), NFL player
- Jack Holmes (footballer), English footballer

== See also ==
- John Holmes (disambiguation)
- Jac Holmes, British volunteer against ISIL
- Jackie Holmes, racecar driver
