= Canada–Philippines relations =

- Canada: Philippines

Diplomatic mission
- Embassy of Canada, Makati: Embassy of the Philippines, Ottawa

Envoy
- Ambassador David Hartman: Ambassador José Victor V. Chan-Gonzaga

Canada and the Philippines have maintained bilateral relations since 1949.

== Economic relations ==
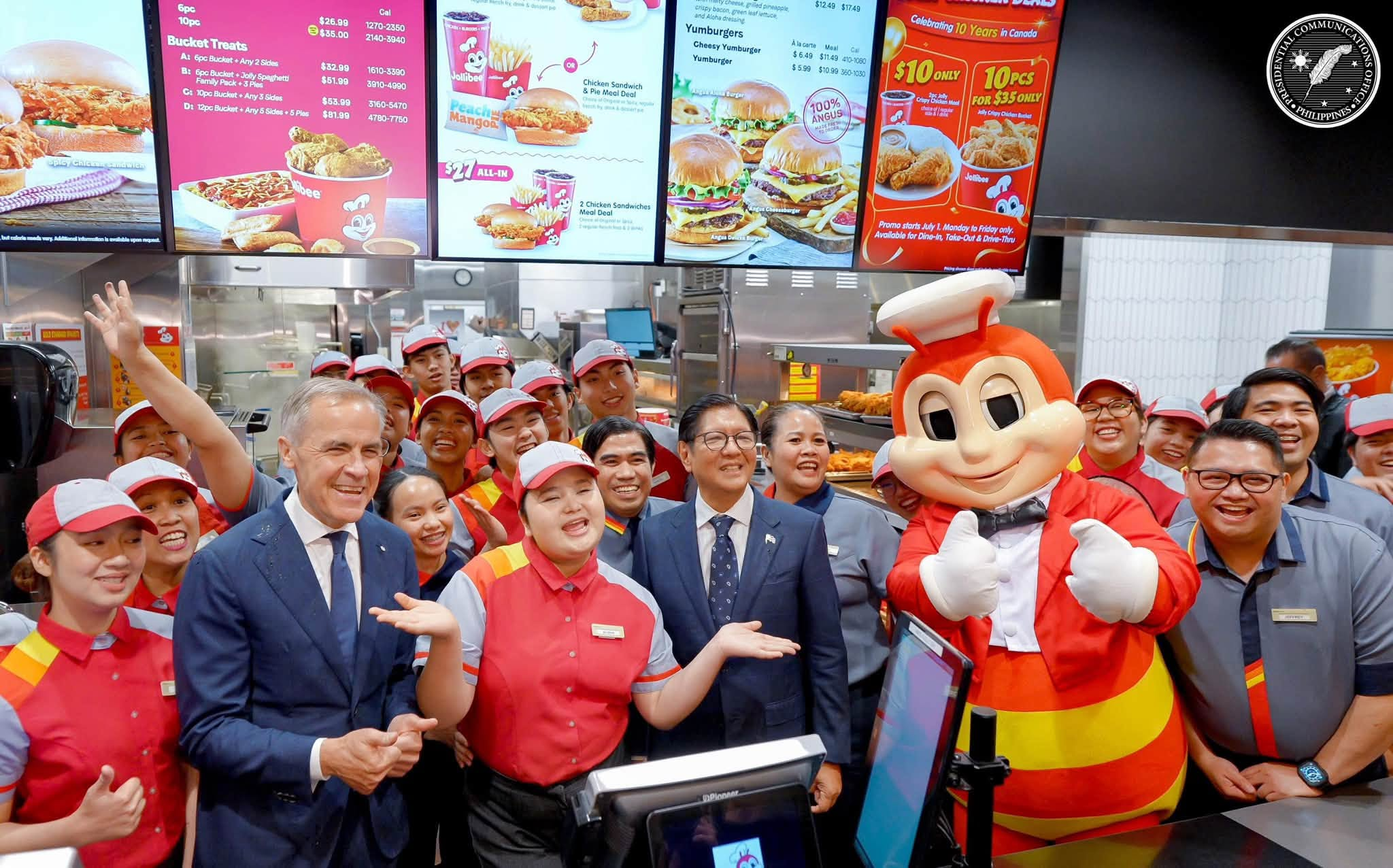
Canadian prime minister Mark Carney and Philippine president Bongbong Marcos at a Vancouver branch of the Filipino-based restaurant chain Jollibee in 2026

In 2012, Canadian exports to the Philippines were (CAD) $527.9 million, while exports to Canada from the Philippines were valued at $991.2 million. By 2024, exports of goods to the Philippines had increased to $1.4 billion, and exports of goods to Canada had increased to $1.8 billion. The Canada–Philippines waste dispute was a point of trade contention between the two nations from 2013 until the return of the waste in 2019. Nonetheless, negotiations for a bilateral free trade agreement are expected to conclude in 2026.

== Political relations ==
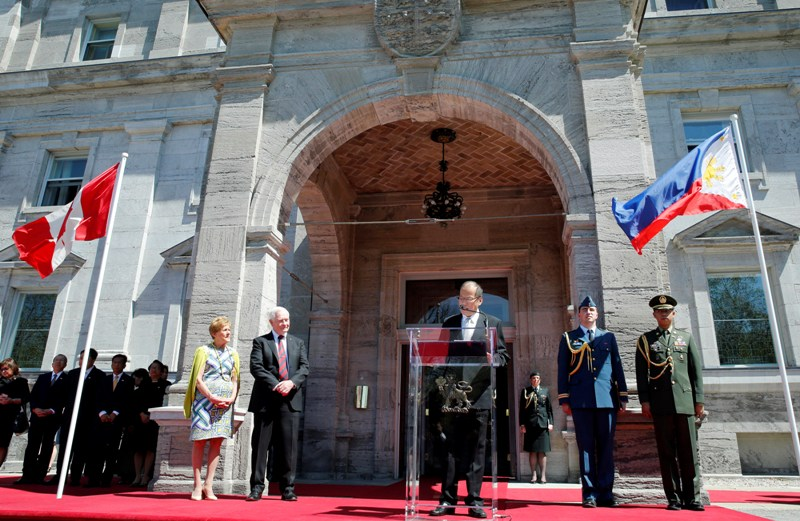
Philippine president Benigno Aquino III during his state visit to Canada in 2015

Canadian prime minister Jean Chrétien, together with a business delegate, visited the Philippines in 1997. Canadian prime minister Stephen Harper also paid a state visit to the Philippines on November 9–11, 2012. Philippine president Benigno Aquino III paid a state visit to Canada on May 7–9, 2015. Philippine president Bongbong Marcos paid an official visit to Vancouver, Canada, on July 1–4, 2026.

Canadian prime ministers and Philippine presidents have conducted bilateral meetings at ASEAN Summits, since Canada has been a dialogue partner of ASEAN since 1977. Former Canadian prime minister Justin Trudeau met with former Philippine president Rodrigo Duterte at the 2017 summit in Manila, and with current president Bongbong Marcos at the 2022-24 summits. Current Canadian prime minister Mark Carney also met with Marcos at the 2025 summit.

== Military relations ==
In March 2025, the Philippines and Canada announced plans to sign a Status of Visiting Forces Agreement (SOVFA) to enhance defence cooperation and interoperability. The SOVFA was signed in November 2025, setting a legal framework for joint military exercises, and further boosted by a mutual logistics support agreement signed in June 2026.

== Migration and cultural relations ==
In 2016, there were more than 850,000 people of Filipino origin in Canada; by 2021, this had increased to about 957,000 Filipinos. Most of this population (71.5%) are immigrants, and the Philippines was the second most common country of birth for immigrants to Canada, after India. Filipinos are the fourth largest visible minority in Canada, behind the South Asian, Chinese, and Black populations. In 2013, the Philippines had become the largest source of temporary workers. From 2006 to 2011, Tagalog was the fastest-growing language in Canada. Filipino Heritage Month is commemorated every June.

In 2013, there were about 7,500 Canadians in the Philippines. By 2020, there were 861 Canadian foreign citizens and 5,299 Filipinos with Canadian dual citizenship in the country.

== Resident diplomatic missions ==
of Canada in the Philippines

- Manila (Embassy)

of the Philippines in Canada

- Ottawa (Embassy)
- Calgary (Consulate-General)
- Toronto (Consulate-General)
- Vancouver (Consulate-General)

Building hosting the Embassy of Canada in Manila

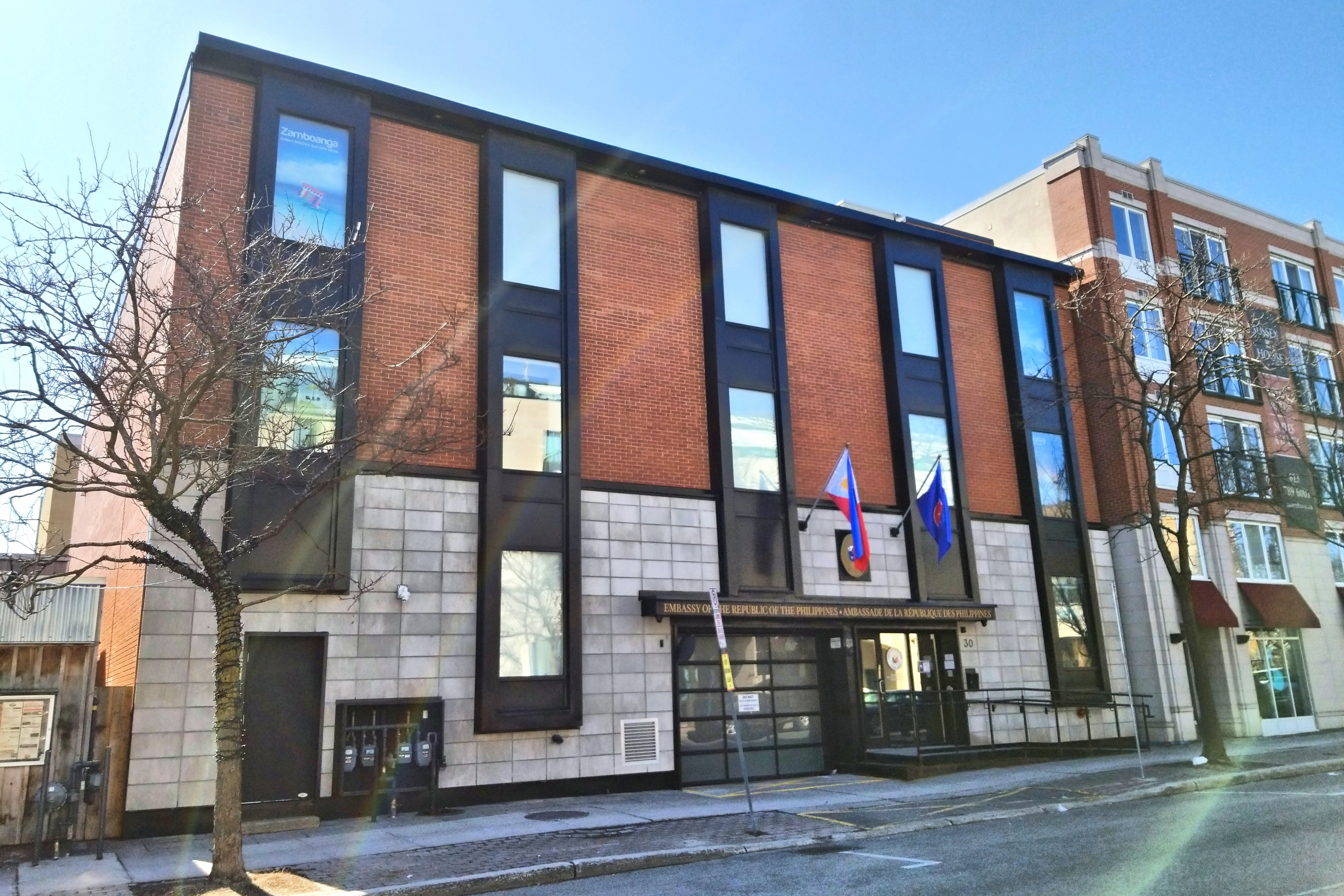
Embassy of the Philippines in Ottawa

Consulate-General of the Philippines in Calgary

== See also ==
- Foreign relations of Canada
- Foreign relations of the Philippines
