= Filipino Canadians =

Ethnic group

- Filipino ancestry in Canada as a percentage of the population, by census division (2021 census)

Total population
- 957,355; 2.58% of the Canadian population (2021)

Regions with significant populations
- Toronto, Winnipeg, Calgary, Edmonton, Vancouver
- Ontario: 363,650 (2.6%)
- Alberta: 216,710 (5.2%)
- British Columbia: 174,280 (3.5%)
- Manitoba: 94,315 (7.2%)
- Quebec: 44,885 (0.5%)
- Saskatchewan: 43,755 (4.0%)

Languages
- English (Canadian, Philippine), Canadian French, Filipino (Tagalog), Visayan languages, Ilocano, Kapampangan, and other languages of the Philippines

Religion
- Roman Catholicism, Protestantism, Iglesia ni Cristo; Minority: Islam and Irreligion

Related ethnic groups
- Filipino Americans and other Overseas Filipinos

Filipino Canadians (French: Canadiens d'origine philippine; Filipino: Mga Pilipinong Kanadyense) are Canadians who have a Filipino descent or ethnicity. The Filipino Canadians are the second largest subgroup of the overseas Filipinos, surpassed only by the Filipino Americans, and one of the fastest-growing minority in Canada.

Only a small population of Filipinos lived in Canada until the late 20th century. At the 2016 Canadian census, 851,410 people of Filipino descent lived in Canada, mostly in urban areas. The majority of Filipino Canadians speak Tagalog. Filipino Canadians are the third-largest Asian Canadian group in the nation after the Indian and Chinese communities. They are also the largest group from Southeast Asia in the country. Between the 2011 and 2016 censuses, the Filipino community in Canada grew from 702,200 to 820,100, a growth of about 7%, compared to the rest of Canada, which grew by 5% during the same time period.

By the 2021 census, Filipino Canadians enumerated 957,355, or 2.58% of the total population, further displaying the community's rapid growth.

== Early Filipinos in British Columbia ==
Manila and Vancouver on opposite sides of the Pacific

Filipino migration to North America began with Philippine-made ships crossing the Pacific Ocean during the Manila galleon trade. As early as 1565, Spain began sending vessels northeast from the Philippines, riding the Kuroshio Current in a sweeping circular route across the northern part of the Pacific. Filipino servants, stowaways, and mariners arrived in parts of the west coast of North America, from what is now Mexico to as far north as Alaska. By late 1700s, "Manila men" were recruited in naval operations, aboard the ship San Carlos el Filipino sent to support the short-lived Spanish settlement of Santa Cruz de Nuca and Fort San Miguel, Nootka Island, off the coast of Vancouver Island.

Canada's earliest documented Filipinos coincided with North America's first wave of Asian immigration in the 1800s. At least nine male Filipino sailors, aged twenty-four to forty-two, appeared on the 1881 census of British Columbia. Living on a vessel in New Westminster, they were recorded ethno-racially as "Malay" [a loose term to describe Austronesian people] and listed as "Mahomitan" [an archaic term for Muslim].

A small Filipino community resided in Bowen Island, British Columbia in the 1880s. They probably engaged in both fishing and farming. They included Fernando Toreenya, a fisherman who came to Canada from the Philippines in 1886 at the age of 20 years old. With his First Nations partner Mary/Marie Adams, they lived in Snug Cove and had three other Filipino boarders living with them, William Matilda, Antoni Bentorre, and Ricardo Castro. Others included Ben Flores, who were "beachcombers and fishermen" and were settled on a barge in Snug Cove; Basinto Pasento, who called his home Pasento Ranch and died in February 1904, John Delmond, and Jose Garcia. Several others worked as loggers, millhand, mine labourers, and longshoremen intermarrying with Indigenous peoples and other Pacific Islanders. By the turn of the century, there was a significant number of Filipinos; they were either naturalized as Canadians or were U.S. nationals in the Lower Mainland region of British Columbia.

== History of Filipinos in Canada ==
Larger numbers of Filipinos migrated to Canada in the 1930s. In 1950, 10 Filipinos were recorded in Manitoba. The first-generation Filipino Canadians were mainly women who worked as nurses and teachers and in the health sector. These first Filipinos came from the United States to renew their visas after they had expired in the hope of returning to the U.S. Most of them returned, but some stayed in Canada.

From 1946 to 1964, the total number of Filipinos in Canada was 770. In the 1960s, Canada recruited more professionals, mostly from the United States, with some coming directly from the Philippines. Most of the nurses, technicians, office workers and doctors arrived in Winnipeg, Manitoba. In the late 1960s, more Filipinos came to Winnipeg to work in the garment industry.

During the 1970s, most Filipinos came directly from the Philippines to Winnipeg to work in clerical, sales and manufacturing fields. In the late 1970s, more Filipinos came to join their relatives who worked in Canada under the family reunification program. More and more Filipinos decided to settle in Ontario, particularly in Toronto, where jobs were prospering.

In the 1980s, Canada saw an influx of Filipino contract workers, many who found work as live-in caregivers. Many of the contract workers later became landed immigrants under the Live-In Caregiver Program.

During the 1990s, more Filipinos came as families and independents instead of being sponsored by family or being recruited as contract workers.

From 1990 onward, there has been a steady flow of Filipinos entering Canada, with about 10,000 to 20,000 coming in every year. In December 2008, the Philippines passed China as Canada's leading source of immigrants.

== Wealth, education, politics, and socioeconomics ==
As of 2016, Filipino Canadians are a relatively recent immigrant group with the majority immigrating after the 2000s; most identify as first-generation or generation 1.5 (adolescent) immigrants. Out of the 780,130 Filipino Canadians, only 13,125 considered themselves third-generation. 74.5% of Filipino Canadians are first generation.

Filipino Canadians are paid less than those who are not a visible ethnic minority and the total population. It was reported that the average employment income for Filipino Canadians was $41,280, which was significantly lower compared to those who are not a visible ethnic minority ($52,550) and the total population ($50,280).

Filipino Canadians had more earners per family. About 81% of the Filipino group lived in families with two or more earners, compared with 55% of the White group. 39.9% had three or more family members with employment income.

If the Filipino group had a similar sociodemographic profile as the white group, its poverty rate would be about 1 percentage point higher than the observed rate for the group.

Filipino Canadian men and women were the least likely among all visible minorities to be unemployed at 5.8% and 4.7% respectively.

Filipino Canadians were largely more educated but had a significantly lower rate of attaining a Graduate degree then other ethnic groups.

Filipino Canadians are more likely to work in the health care industry and the social assistance industry (20.6%) than some other visible minorities.

Despite representing a large immigration group, there have been only two Filipino-Canadians elected as federal members of parliament: Rey Pagtakhan (1988) and Rechie Valdez (2021).

== Immigration ==
According to the 2021 Canadian census, Philippines is the third largest source country for immigration to Canada.

=== Greater Toronto Area ===
The Greater Toronto Area (GTA), which includes the city of Toronto, and the regional municipalities of Durham, Halton, Peel, and York, is home to the largest Filipino community in Canada with a third of all Filipino Canadians calling the GTA home. As of the 2016 Census, there were 282,385 people of Filipino descent living in the GTA making them the fourth largest visible minority group behind the Indian, Chinese, and Black communities. The number of Filipino Canadians in the GTA grew from 252,120 in 2011 to 282,385 in 2016, representing a growth of 12% in 5 years.

Tagalog is the fifth most spoken language apart from English or French to be spoken in the GTA, and is also one of the fastest-growing languages in the region. Other Philippine languages, such as Ilocano, and Cebuano, also have a sizeable number of speakers throughout the region.

==== Population distribution ====
Filipinos are generally well spread out throughout the GTA, with a few areas of concentration. In the city of Toronto, the former municipalities of Scarborough and North York are popular destinations for new Filipino immigrants and naturalized Filipino Canadians alike. According to the 2016 Census, Tagalog is the most common non-English mother tongue language in the following neighbourhoods:

1. Clanton Park (11.2%)
2. Briar Hill-Belgravia (10.4%)
3. Englemount-Lawrence (10.1%)
4. Ionview (9.4%)
5. Kennedy Park (8.2%)
6. North St. James Town (8.1%)
7. Forest Hill North (6.9%)
8. Wexford-Maryvale (6.8%)
9. Humewood-Cedarvale (6.0%)
10. West Hill (4.7%)
11. Bedford Park-Nortown (4.2%)
12. Guildwood (2.2%)
13. Forest Hill South (2.0%)

Other Philippine languages also ranked among the most common non-English mother tongue languages. Ilocano ranked in the top 10 non-English mother tongue languages in three neighbourhoods (Briar Hill-Belgravia, Englemount-Lawrence, Clanton Park). Cebuano also ranked in the top 10 languages for the Briar Hill-Belgravia neighbourhood.

Outside of the city of Toronto, Mississauga, Markham and Vaughan in York Region, Ajax and Pickering in Durham Region, and Milton in Halton Region have large percentages of Filipino residents. Brampton contains a large concentration of Filipinos. Most Filipinos in Brampton live in Bramalea or in downtown Brampton. Some Filipino families have migrated into more affluent pockets like Peel Village around Bartley Bull Parkway.

=== Metro Vancouver ===
Vancouver is home to Canada's second largest Filipino community, after the Toronto metro area. According to the 2101 Canadian Census,142,125 residents identified as Filipino, representing 5.5% of the metropolitan population and 14.8% of all Filipinos in Canada. Filipinos in Vancouver make up the third-largest Asian Canadian and visible minority group behind the Chinese and South Asians. Most of British Columbia's 174,280 Filipinos reside in the Greater Vancouver Area. Overall, about one in five Filipinos in Canada call Metro Vancouver home.

Each year, Lapu-Lapu Day is celebrated by Filipino Canadians in Vancouver.

Efforts to establish a permanent Filipino Cultural Centre of Canada in Vancouver have gained public and government attention. In December 2025, Vancouver City Council voted to advance the review of a proposed cultural centre and hotel development in Mount Pleasant, while also supporting the establishment of an interim community space. In 2026, the Filipino Legacy Society and developer PortLiving unveiled a revised proposal for a ten-storey mixed-use development at 160 East 2nd Avenue in Vancouver, incorporating a permanent Filipino Culture Centre.

=== Winnipeg ===
Winnipeg is home to 77,305 Filipinos, making up the third largest Filipino community in Canada by total population. However, Filipinos make up a greater percentage of the Winnipeg city population (8.7%) than any other city in Canada. The Filipino community in Winnipeg is the largest visible minority group in Winnipeg, ahead of the Chinese-Canadians and Indo-Canadians (but excluding Indigenous Canadians, who are not counted as a visible minority by Statistics Canada). Winnipeg is home to one of the oldest Filipino communities in Canada, with immigration to Winnipeg beginning before 1950. Winnipeg was home to the largest Filipino community before the 1980s. About one out of 10 Filipinos in Canada call Winnipeg home.

Winnipeg includes a Filipino community centre called The Philippine Canadian Centre of Manitoba (PCCM), providing social and service to the Filipino community and also holding events such as Folklorama. There are also Filipino newspapers such as The Pilipino Express News Magazine, The Filipino Journal, and Ang Peryodiko. There is also a radio station, CKJS, which broadcasts Filipino-related news, music, lifestyle and much more.

Winnipeg's Filipino population is largely concentrated in the West End and North End areas of the city. The neighbourhood around Sargent Avenue and Arlington Street is 45% Filipino, and the neighbourhood around Sargent Avenue and Wall Street is 47% Filipino.

Filipinos in Winnipeg contribute greatly to the local economy. Jollibee, a well known global Filipino fast food chain, has its first 2 Canadian locations established in this city.

=== Calgary Metropolitan Region ===
Calgary is home to over 75,000 Filipinos making them the fourth largest Filipino community in Canada. Filipinos started coming in droves in Calgary in the early 1980s and 1990s. Outside of Calgary, some smaller communities are experiencing an influx of Filipino immigrants to fill job vacancies. These new immigrants and their children work to integrate and flourish in Canada.

=== Edmonton Metropolitan Region ===
According to the 2016 Canadian census, 64,275 Filipinos live and work in the Edmonton Metropolitan Region. Various Filipino associations celebrate the culture and take part in large metropolitan events such as the Edmonton Heritage Festival. In 2002, the Filipino community presented its home nation as the "Featured Country" during Capital Ex (formerly Klondike Days). Edmonton is also the home of the Philippine Cultural Society, the Philippine Choral Society, and the Karilagan Dance Society.

Radio station CKER-FM also broadcasts community programming to Filipinos in Edmonton.

=== Greater Montreal ===
The sixth largest Filipino community in Canada, Montreal is home to nearly 36,000 Filipinos. Filipinos in Montreal are concentrated in the Snowdon neighbourhood and around Decarie Expressway, both areas have many Filipino establishments and professional offices. The Filipino Association of Montreal and Suburbs is an advocacy group for Filipino Canadians active in and around the city of Montreal. It is the oldest such association in Quebec.

=== National Capital Region ===
The National Capital Region made up of the cities of Ottawa, Ontario and Gatineau, Quebec is home to the seventh largest Filipino community in Canada with over 14,000 Filipinos residing in Canada's capital. Ottawa is also the home of the Philippine Embassy and ambassador to Canada.

=== Southwestern Ontario ===
Southwestern Ontario is home to over 15,000 Filipinos. Most of them live in the cities of Cambridge, Guelph, Kitchener, London, and Windsor. Southwestern Ontario is home to a Filipino community.

=== Hamilton ===
The city of Hamilton situated on the western shore of Lake Ontario is home to almost 12,000 Filipinos. Hamilton is home to the first Filipino community centre and school in Canada both opening in the early 80s and late 70s, respectively.

=== Niagara Region ===
The Niagara Region on the south shore of Lake Ontario is home to over 4,000 Filipinos. They form a community concentrated in the cities of St. Catharines and Niagara Falls. Niagara-on-the-lake is home to a notable community as well and is the only town to have had a Filipino mayor in Canada, Arturo Viola.

=== Northern Canada ===
The northern territories of Yukon, Northwest Territories, and Nunavut have a Filipino community of almost 3,000 despite an extremely cold climate. The Filipino community has grown steadily from 735 in 2001. Filipinos in the Northwest Territories make the largest visible minority group there with a population of 1,410. Filipinos in the Yukon Territory are the second-largest minority group to the Chinese with a community of 1,310 living there. Nunavut has a growing Filipino population of 245. The territories received about 50 Filipinos on average a year from 2001 to 2006.

== Demographics ==
Most Filipinos who immigrate to Canada settle in the large urban areas where there are more jobs and a vibrant community life. These areas include: Metro Vancouver, Greater Calgary, Edmonton Capital Region, City of Winnipeg, the Greater Toronto Area, and Greater Montreal. According to Statistics Canada seeing the current trend, by 2031, the Filipino Canadian population is projected to reach between 1.9 and 2.1 million. Much of this growth will be bolstered by high immigration rates, assuming immigration to the United States remains as restricted as it has been. Notably, Canada now has a Filipino population more than twice as large percentage-wise as that of the United States, the Philippines' former colonizer. The Filipino population in Canada is also somewhat more dispersed, as the majority of Filipino Americans are found in the far western and southern United States.

Number of Philippine nationals granted permanent residence in Canada by year
Year	Number of Philippine nationals admitted	Total number of permanent residents admitted	Proportion of permanent residents admitted
2002	11,011	229,048	4.8%
2003	11,987	221,349	5.4%
2004	13,303	235,823	5.6%
2005	17,525	262,242	6.7%
2006	17,718	251,640	7%
2007	19,067	236,753	8.1%
2008	23,727	247,246	9.6%
2009	27,277	252,174	10.8%
2010	36,580	280,691	13%
2011	34,991	248,748	14.1%
2012	34,314	257,895	13.3%
2013	29,539	258,953	11.4%
2014	40,032	260,282	15.4%
2015	50,846	271,847	18.7%

=== 2011 Canadian census ===
- Toronto – 132,445 (5.1%)
- Winnipeg – 56,400 (8.7%)
- Calgary – 47,350 (4.4%)
- Mississauga – 39,800 (5.6%)
- Edmonton – 36,565 (4.6%)
- Vancouver – 35,490 (6.0%)
- Surrey – 26,480 (5.7%)
- Montreal – 21,750 (1.3%)
- Brampton – 17,905 (3.4%)
- Burnaby – 12,905 (5.9%)
- Richmond – 12,670 (6.7%)
- Ottawa – 10,530 (1.2%)

=== 2006 Canadian census ===
==== By City ====
- Toronto – 102,555
- Winnipeg – 36,820
- Mississauga (Toronto CMA) – 30,705
- Vancouver – 28,605
- Calgary – 24,915
- Edmonton – 18,245
- Montreal – 17,100
- Surrey (Vancouver CMA) – 16,555
- Brampton (Toronto CMA) – 11,980
- Markham (Toronto CMA) – 7,370
- Ottawa – 7,115
- Vaughan (Toronto CMA) – 5,360
- Hamilton – 4,040
- Windsor – 2,630
- London – 1,790

==== By Census Metropolitan Area ====
Sources:

- Toronto CMA – 171,980
- Vancouver CMA – 78,890
- Winnipeg CMA – 36,935
- Calgary CMA – 25,565
- Montreal CMA – 23,510
- Edmonton CMA – 19,625
- Ottawa – Gatineau CMA – 7,330
- Hamilton CMA – 4,880
- Windsor CMA – 3,145
- Victoria CMA – 2,760
- Oshawa CMA – 2,155
- St. Catharines – Niagara CMA – 2,130
- London CMA – 1,990
- Guelph CMA – 1,965
- Saskatoon CMA – 1,915
- Kitchener-Cambridge-Waterloo CMA – 1,850
- Regina CMA – 1,230

=== Religion ===
Filipino Canadian demography by religion
Religious group	2021 (Note: Religious breakdown proportions based on "Filipino" ethnic or cultural origin responses on the 2021 census.)		2001 (Note: Religious breakdown proportions based on "Filipino" ethnic or cultural origin responses on the 2001 census.)	
Religious group	Pop.	%	Pop.	%
Christianity	851,915	92.05%	316,005	96.48%
Islam	4,135	0.45%	1,615	0.49%
Judaism	620	0.07%	240	0.07%
Irreligion	66,395	7.17%	8,790	2.68%
Buddhism	690	0.07%	410	0.13%
Hinduism	240	0.03%	130	0.04%
Sikhism	170	0.02%	100	0.03%
Indigenous spirituality	125	0.01%	150	0.05%
Other	1,180	0.13%	100	0.03%
Total Filipino Canadian population	925,485	100%	327,550	100%

Filipino Canadian demography by Christian sects
Religious group	2021		2001	
Religious group	Pop.	%	Pop.	%
Catholic	658,030	77.24%	266,695	84.4%
Orthodox	615	0.07%	310	0.1%
Protestant	97,765	11.48%	35,395	11.83%
Other Christian	95,505	11.21%	13,605	4.31%
Total Filipino Canadian christian population	851,915	100%	316,005	100%

== By province/territory ==
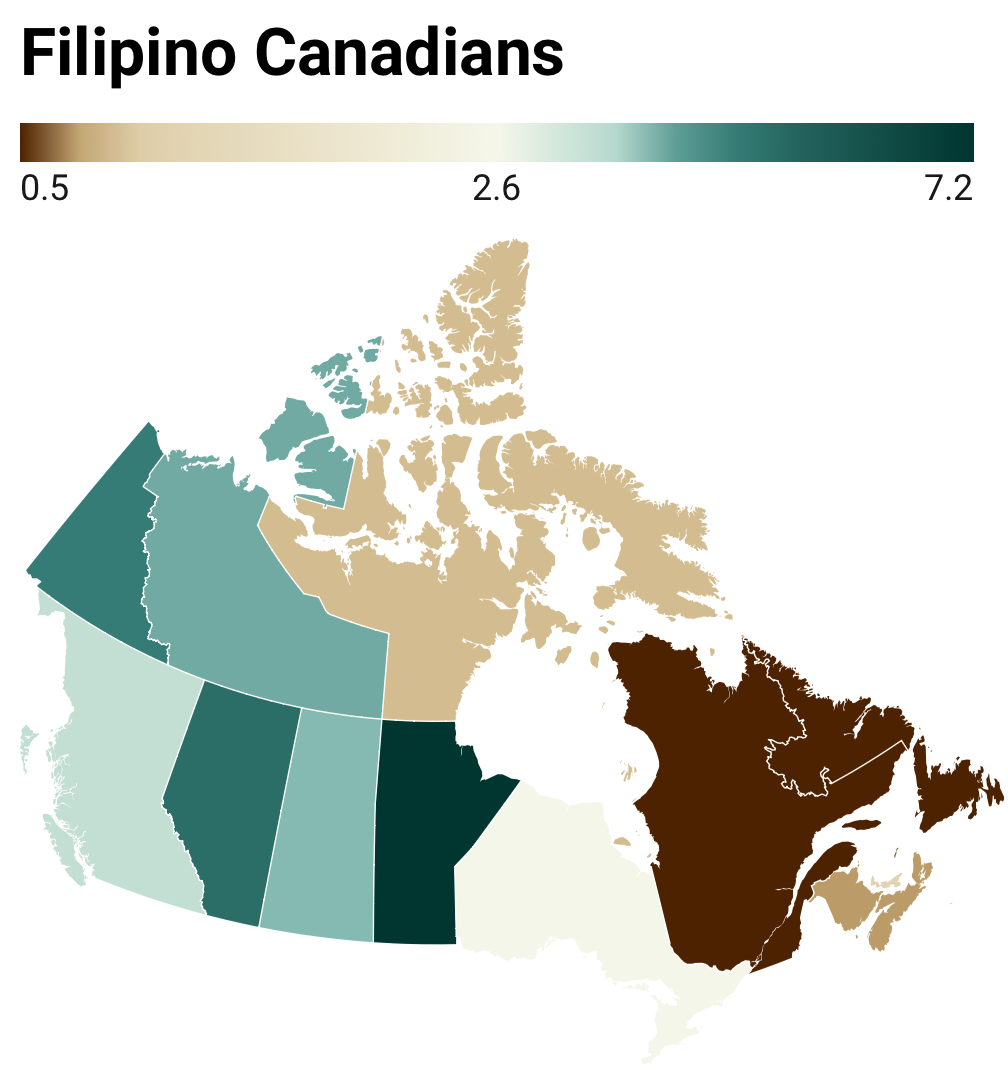
Filipino percent in Canada by province/territory, 2021 census

Province	Filipino 2001	% 2001	Filipino 2011	% 2011	Filipino 2016	% 2016	Filipino 2021	% 2021
Ontario	156,515	1.4%	295,700	2.3%	311,670	2.4%	363,650	2.6%
British Columbia	64,005	1.7%	135,990	3.1%	145,030	3.2%	174,280	3.5%
Alberta	33,940	1.2%	113,205	3.2%	166,195	4.2%	216,710	5.2%
Manitoba	30,490	2.8%	61,270	5.2%	79,820	6.4%	94,315	7.2%
Quebec	18,550	0.2%	34,140	0.4%	34,910	0.4%	44,885	0.5%
Saskatchewan	3,030	0.3%	16,705	1.6%	32,340	3.0%	43,755	4.0%
Nova Scotia	655	0.1%	2,110	0.2%	3,400	0.4%	6,615	0.7%
Newfoundland and Labrador	265	0.1%	1,395	0.3%	1,385	0.3%	2,270	0.5%
New Brunswick	355	0.1%	1,155	0.2%	1,975	0.3%	5,190	0.7%
Northwest Territories	470	1.3%	975	2.4%	1,300	3.2%	1,665	4.1%
Yukon	235	0.8%	735	2.2%	1,190	3.4%	1,945	4.9%
Nunavut	35	0.1%	140	0.4%	230	0.6%	315	0.9%
Prince Edward Island	35	0.0%	95	0.1%	670	0.5%	1,760	1.2%
Canada	308,575	1.0%	662,600	2.0%	780,125	2.3%	957,355	2.6%

The majority of Filipino-Canadians are women; they make up about 65% of the population.

=== By gender ===
- Male – 427,755
- Female – 529,600

=== Canadian census subdivisions with Filipino populations higher than the national average ===
Source: 2021 Canadian census
National average: 2.6%

==== Alberta ====
- Waskatenau (22.6%)
- Sawridge (22.2%)
- Andrew (15.9%)
- High Prairie (14.6%)
- Brooks (13.4%)
- Trochu (12.5%)
- Slave Lake (10.7%)
- Manning (10.6%)
- High River (10.5%)
- Valleyview (9.6%)
- Vilna (9.1%)
- Fox Creek (8.9%)
- Banff (8.8%)
- Red Deer (8.3%)
- Wood Buffalo (8.3%)
- Peace River (8.3%)
- High Level (8.3%)
- Fairview (8%)
- Wetaskiwin (7.9%)
- Wainwright (7.7%)
- Edmonton (7.1%)
- Jasper (7%)
- Calgary (6.5%)
- Lloydminster (5.7%)
- Chestermere (4.1%)

==== British Columbia ====
- New Westminster (8.7%)
- Richmond (7.3%)
- Surrey (7.0%)
- Radium Hot Springs (6.9%)
- North Vancouver (6.6%)
- Vancouver (5.9%)
- Burnaby (5.8%)
- Dawson Creek (5.5%)
- Chetwynd (5.5%)
- Fort St. John (5.3%)
- Port Coquitlam (5.1%)
- Pitt Meadows (4.5%)
- Whistler (4.2%)
- Langley (3.9%)
- Coquitlam (3.6%)
- Sidney (3.6%)
- Delta (3.4%)
- Maple Ridge (3.3%)
- Sechelt (3.3%)
- Cache Creek (3.2%)
- Tumbler Ridge (3.1%)
- Langford (3.0%)
- Northern Rockies (3.0%)
- Tsawwassen (3.0%)
- Midway (3.0%)
- Victoria (2.7%)
- Smithers (2.7%)
- Burrard Inlet (2.7%)

==== Manitoba ====
- Neepawa (45.8%)
- Gladstone (23.2%)
- Winnipeg (11.1%)
- Russell (11.1%)
- Steinbach (8.5%)
- Portage la Prairie (3%)
- Winkler (2.6%)

==== Northwest Territories ====
- Yellowknife (4%)

==== Ontario ====
- Toronto (6.1%)
- Moosonee (5.6%)
- Mississauga (5.3%)
- Ajax (5.3%)
- Pickering (4.1%)
- Milton (4%)
- Brampton (3.2%)
- Niagara Falls (3%)
- Vaughan (2.8%)
- Markham (2.7%)
- Whitchurch-Stouffville (2.7%)
- Guelph (2.7%)

==== Quebec ====
- Dollard-des-Ormeaux (4.8%)
- Côte-Saint-Luc (4.9%)
- Dorval (2.9%)
- Vaudreuil-Dorion (2.8%)
- Hampstead (2.8%)

==== Saskatchewan ====
- North Battleford (7.7%)
- Yorkton (6.8%)
- Saskatoon (5.4%)
- Regina (5.3%)
- Moose Jaw (3.1%)

==== Yukon ====
- Whitehorse (2.9%)

== Films ==
Noteworthy films centred on Filipino Canadians have included Altar Boy, Francheska: Prairie Queen, I Propose We Never See Each Other Again After Tonight, Islands and Stryker.

== Notable people ==
Filipinos from the GTA have made significant contributions to the Canadian political landscape. Notable residents include Tobias Enverga, the first Canadian of Filipino descent elected in the City of Toronto and appointed to the Senate of Canada, Brampton City Councillor Rowena Santos, Town of Ajax Ward 3 Councillor Lisa Bower, TCDSB trustee Garry Tanuan, and Mississauga-Streetsville MP Rechie Valdez.

== See also ==
- Overseas Filipinos
- Canada–Philippines relations
- Canada–Philippines waste dispute
- Asian Canadians
- Asian Americans
- Filipino Americans
- 2025 Vancouver car attack
- Montreal–Philippines cutlery controversy
