= Oliver Hall =

Oliver Hall may refer to:

- Oliver Hall (politician) (1852–1946), American politician serving in the Washington State Senate
- Oliver Hall (YPG fighter) (1993–2017), British volunteer with the Kurdish YPG militia
- Ollie Hall (1952–2020), Australian actor and rugby union player
