= BBC East Midlands =

English region of the BBC

- BBC East Midlands's area within the UK
- TV transmitters: Waltham
- Radio stations: BBC Radio Derby; BBC Radio Leicester; BBC Radio Nottingham; BBC Radio Lincolnshire; BBC Radio Northampton
- Headquarters: London Road, West Bridgford, Nottingham, NG2 4UU
- Area: Derbyshire (except High Peak, Chesterfield, Bolsover, North East Derbyshire, and Northern parts of Derbyshire Dales); Leicestershire; Nottinghamshire (except Bassetlaw); Rutland; Lincolnshire (South Kesteven) some northern parts of Northamptonshire
- Nation: BBC English Regions
- Regions: East Midlands
- Key people: Stuart Thomas (Head of Regional & Local Programmes)
- Launch date: January 1991

BBC East Midlands is the BBC English Region covering Derbyshire (except High Peak, Chesterfield, North East Derbyshire and the northern areas of the Derbyshire Dales), Leicestershire, Nottinghamshire (except Bassetlaw), Rutland, South Kesteven in Lincolnshire and some northern parts of Northamptonshire.

== Services ==
=== Television ===
BBC East Midlands's television output consists of the flagship regional news service East Midlands Today. The region also produces its own political programme Politics East Midlands which airs on Sunday mornings when Parliament is in session.

=== Radio ===
The region is the controlling centre for BBC Radio Nottingham, BBC Radio Derby and BBC Radio Leicester.

On weekdays, each local radio station will have three standardised programme blocks with a total of three presenters for daytime as follows:

- 6 am Breakfast
- 10 am Mid-morning
- 2 pm Afternoons
- 6 pm Evenings

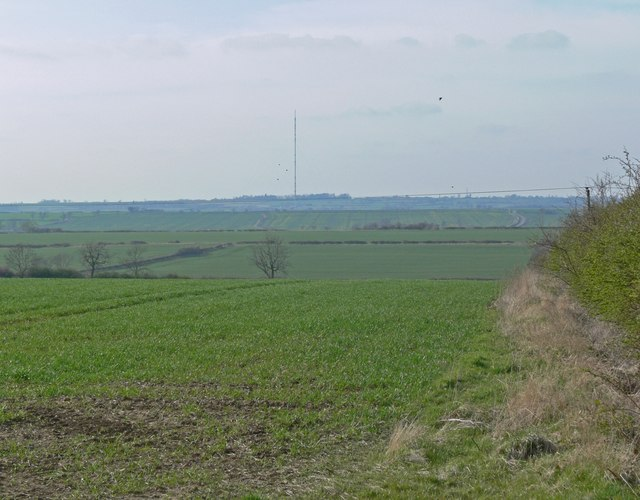
Waltham transmitter in Leicestershire countryside

=== Online and Interactive ===
BBC East Midlands also produces regional news & local radio pages for BBC Red Button and the 'BBC Local News' websites for each county.

== History ==
The region itself used to be part of BBC Midlands as one large region controlled from Pebble Mill Studios but was served by a small television and radio studio based on the top floor of Willson House on Derby Road in Nottingham. This studio supplied live reporter pieces and interviews as injects into the BBC Midlands evening programme "Midlands Today", which were seen by the whole region - the Nottingham studio also produced some regional programming, including The Dog Show and Dennis McCarthy's Weekly Echo.

However, to better serve East Midlands viewers, a few changes were made. Initially, the region was given an opt-out news service consisting of an opt-out within Midlands Today and some short bulletins, but this was expanded in January 1991, when a whole new region was created. The new region had a new news programme, although the programme's visual identity remained the same as its West Midlands counterpart. The region is now very much separate from the Midlands region.

== Studios ==
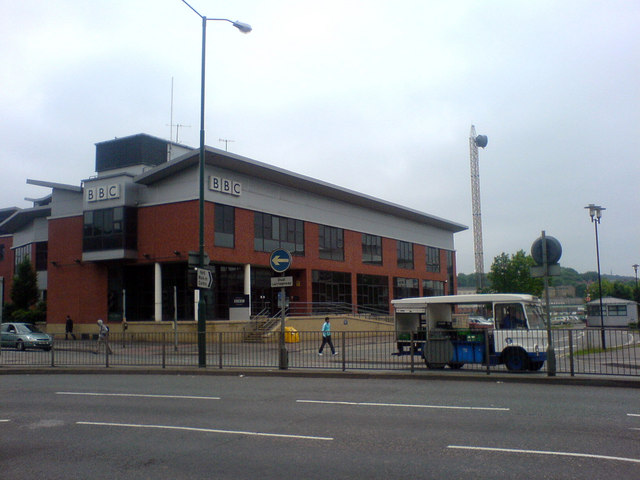
Headquarters of BBC East Midlands

In 1991, the TV studios, Radio Nottingham, and the BBC region's offices were at York House on Mansfield Road. This became Nottingham Trent University's Centre for Broadcasting & Journalism, with the TV studios left intact; NTU's centre opened in September 1999. York House was demolished in 2021. In 2009, NTU moved its broadcasting centre to its Chaucer Building on Goldsmith Street.

=== New headquarters ===
The Nottingham headquarters were built after the region was created, and were state of the art. Construction began on 3 September 1997, costing £4.5million, and built by Simons Construction of Lincoln; the site had been bought originally from Boots. The site opened on 10 January 1999. At the time Richard Lucas was HRLP for the region, and this region included Lincolnshire.

When constructed in January 1999, it contained the newsroom for East Midlands Today, a small studio for use by regional news, and accommodation for BBC Radio Nottingham. It is located on London Road, Nottingham.

In addition to the main headquarters, the region has offices in St. Helens Street, Derby containing BBC Radio Derby, and in St. Nicholas Place, Leicester housing BBC Radio Leicester. Both of these premises also contain news bureaux for East Midlands Today.

== See also ==
- BBC English Regions
- The East Midlands Television Centre, of Central East, opened in November 1983, cost £23million, and officially opened by Prince Philip, Duke of Edinburgh at 11:30am on 2 March 1984, after he arrived on the Royal train at 10am, and later personally flying a Hawker Siddeley Andover from East Midlands Airport to Heathrow.
