= John Holmes (radio presenter) =

British radio presenter (born 1946/47)

John Holmes MBE
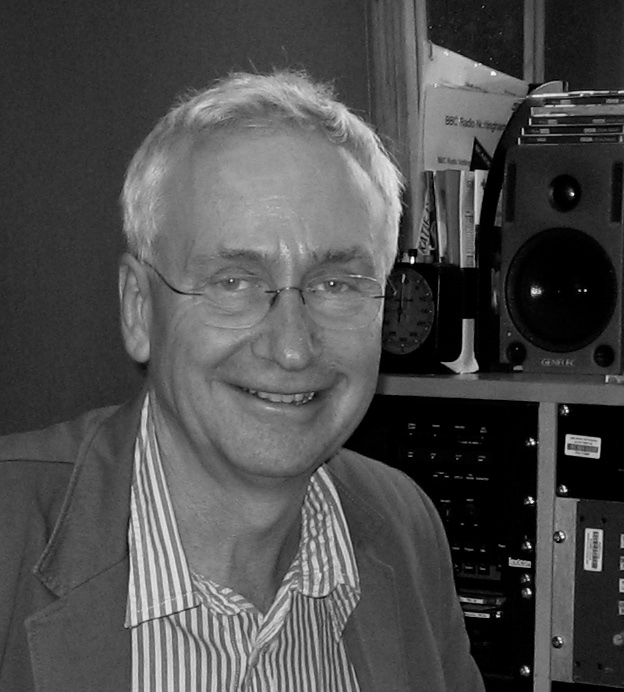
- Holmes at BBC Radio Nottingham (2006)
- Born: 1946 or 1947 (age 79–80); Essex, England
- Spouse: Kathleen (Kate) née Melbourne
- Children: 3
- Awards: MBE
- Presenting career
- Show: The Afternoon Show
- Station: BBC Radio Nottingham

John Holmes MBE (born 1946 or 1947) is a British radio presenter, closely associated with BBC Radio Nottingham and BBC Radio 4.

At Broadcasting House, Bristol, Holmes worked on the series Down Your Way, Any Questions? and Any Answers?. At Pebble Mill studios, Holmes was a presenter of the BBC Television programmes Look! Hear!, Sparetime and Together.

Holmes moved to Nottingham in October 1965 to study Mining Engineering at the University of Nottingham, graduating in 1968. At university, Holmes met his future wife Kathleen (Kate) Melbourne. Holmes had partially chosen Nottingham to study because Judi Dench and John Neville were based at Nottingham Playhouse. Holmes' wife Kate worked as a nurse at Mapperley Hospital, before taking a break to have the couples' three children.

In July 1977 Holmes presented the BBC Radio Nottingham coverage of Queen Elizabeth II visiting Nottinghamshire.

In 2017, Holmes received an MBE from Prince William, The Duke of Cambridge at Buckingham Palace for services to charity.

As of 2017 Holmes had been patron of charities Family Care and Malt Cross, vice-president of Nottinghamshire Wildlife Trust and chair of skin cancer charity Karen Clifford Skin Cancer Charity (Skcin)—known for the Skcin computer tan hoax.

In 2023, after six years working on BBC Radio Derby, Holmes started presenting the afternoon slot on BBC Radio Nottingham, after a 15-year gap from the Nottingham station.

In 2023, Holmes retired from BBC Radio Nottingham after working for the BBC for over 50 years.
