= Dennis McCarthy (radio presenter) =

British radio presenter (1933–1996)

Dennis McCarthy MBE
- Born: 7 May 1933; London
- Died: 10 January 1996 (aged 62); Bingham, Nottinghamshire
- Spouse: Marjorie McCarthy
- Children: 4
- Awards: MBE
- Presenting career
- Show: Afternoon Special
- Stations: BBC Radio Nottingham; BBC Radio Derby; BBC Radio Leicester; BBC Radio Lincolnshire
- Time slot: 14:00‒16:00
- Show: The Sunday Show
- Station: BBC Radio Nottingham
- Time slot: 09:00‒12:00

Dennis McCarthy MBE (7 May 1933 – 10 January 1996) was a freelance British radio and television presenter closely associated with BBC Radio Nottingham and the Crufts dog show.

== Dogs ==
Dennis McCarthy was a dog breeder, a dog show exhibitor, and a dog show judge—particularly of Afghan Hounds. McCarthy owned the "Pooghan" kennel in Nottingham.

In 1961 and 1963 McCarthy's dogs won prizes in multiple categories at a dog show in Nottingham.

In 1964 McCarthy purchased a 1961-era van to support his pet food business. In June 1965 the van was hit by a lorry, and subsequently deemed unroadworthy.

In December 1965, there were plans to feature a pair of McCarthy's Afghan Hounds on one of Ken Dodd's television shows.

In February 1966, Dennis McCarthy entered the Crufts dog competition with an Afghan Hound called Zorro of Pooghan. In May 1966, a small white-haired poodle worth £100 was accidentally sold while McCarthy was away in Scotland.

In February 1969, McCarthy won six first prizes, including best-in-show, at the Ripley and Heanor Canine Society dog show in Ripley, Derbyshire.

During 1969 the book "Leo C. Wilson On Dogs"—co-edited by McCarthy—was published, collating articles and short stories by Wilson as long-term editor of Dog World.

In February 1971, McCarthy won best-in-show at the Bridgford and District Canine Society Show with Tzara of Pooghan. During 1972 Tzara of Pooghan got a womb infection and was scheduled to have a hysterectomy.

In January 1973, Dennis and Marjorie McCarthy won best exhibit with their Afghan Hound Fluggy and best puppy with their miniature poodle Tiffany, at the Ilkeston and District Canine Society sanction show.

In October 1974, the McCarthy family and their dogs won multiple prizes at the Newark and District Canine Society dog show in Collingham, Nottinghamshire.

In 1976, McCarty moved from Wilford, to Bingham for the convenience of the dogs. A parcel of adjacent land was purchased from Queen Elizabeth II.

McCarthy wrote a 1977-book "The Afghan Hound", published by John Bartholomew and Son.

== Radio career ==
McCarthy joined BBC Radio Nottingham shortly after the start of service in 1968.

During June 1978 McCarthy broadcast six days per week from the Old Market Square, Nottingham, for the Nottingham Festival.

In August 1980, a late-night television series called "Dennis McCarthy's Weekly Echo" began on BBC1 Midlands, broadcast live from Nottingham.

In October 1980, at the British Local Radio Awards, the BBC Radio Nottingham production "Dennis McCarthy in Madrid" received the runner-up Highly Commended recognition.

By 1979 McCarthy's Afternoon Special programme had been attracting large audiences. From 1980, McCarthy broadcast five days a week with Afternoon Special, was simulcast to BBC Radio Leicester, BBC Radio Derby and BBC Radio Lincolnshire.

As of 1982 McCarthy was a regular freelance reporter for BBC Midlands Today.

In March 1988, McCarthy appeared on The Switched-On Parish Pump on BBC Radio 4 about the early years of BBC Local Radio.

On 12 March 1991, immediately after meeting Queen Elizabeth II to collect his MBE at Buckingham Palace, McCarthy presented Afternoon Special from Broadcasting House in London (with guest appearances from actor Dinah Sheridan and boxer Henry Cooper). At the point of receiving his MBE, McCarthy had performed 6,500 radio interviews, including 1,250 interviews for BBC Radio 4 and its Today programme, and made 1,200 television appearances on BBC Midlands Today. McCarthy had made fifty 30-minute programmes for BBC Television, and presented coverage of the Crufts dog show for six years.

In August 1991 McCarthy covered Charlie Chester's Sunday late-afternoon slot on BBC Radio 2. McCarthy had previously presented the other Radio 4 programmes Woman's Hour and Late Night Extra.

In January 1993, McCarthy was interviewing Brian Blessed when a scuffle occurred.

From late-1994, the afternoon slot on BBC Radio Derby was scheduled to be taken over by Graham Knight, with McCarthy continuing to host on BBC Radio Nottingham.

Dennis McCarthy was often assisted by his daughter Tara on The Sunday Show radio broadcasts. Tara was credited on the show as "The World's Youngest DJ", having been appearing since 18 months old on the show.

In 2014 Olympic ice skaters Torvill and Dean stated that one of their best pieces of advice had come from McCarthy: to look after their fans with autograph signing and by replying to fan mail.

== Personal life ==
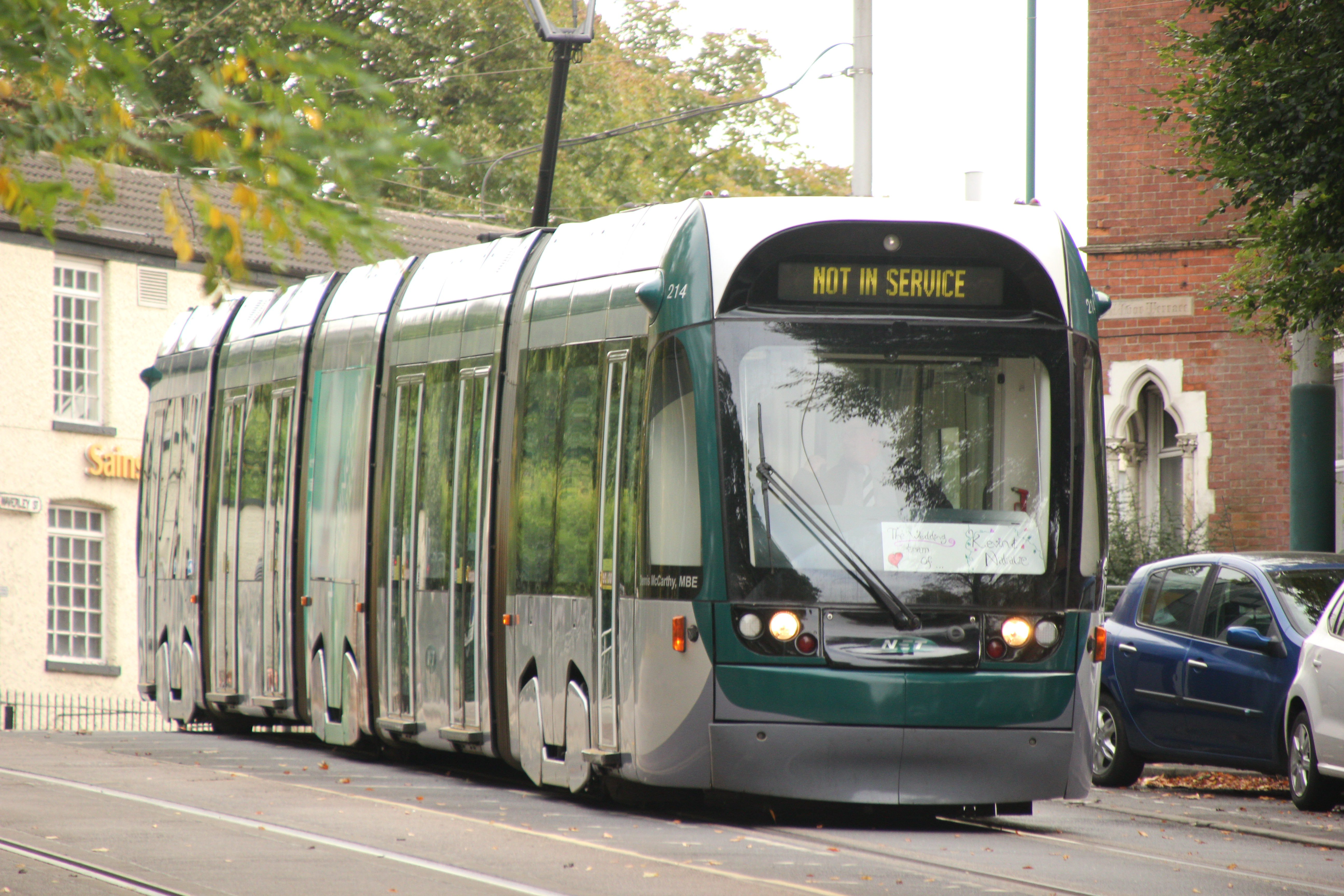
Nottingham tram 214 Dennis McCarthy MBE transporting wedding guests in 2021

In 1944, Dennis McCarty and the rest of his family were evacuated from London to Nottingham.

As of 1965, McCarthy had been friends with Ken Dodd for ten years. In 1981, McCarthy was best man at the wedding of fellow BBC Radio Nottingham presenter Bob Rowe.

Dennis McCarthy received an MBE for services to broadcasting in the 1991 New Year Honours.

In 1992, McCarthy signed copies of his book Woolly Jumper: The true story of an Irish Water Spaniel to raise money for Nottingham-based Childline. On 2 November 1995 McCarthy was due to preside over the opening of Little Acres fostering home.

On 10 January 1996 McCarthy was taken ill on air during an episode of Afternoon Special, McCarthy insisted on finishing the programme, before dying the same day at his home in Bingham. Twenty thousand people lined the streets of Nottingham for McCarthy's funeral procession. The funeral was broadcast live on BBC Radio Nottingham, with a recording of the funeral service released one year later, in aid of homeless charities in Nottingham.

His wife Marjorie McCarthy died two years later in October 1998, also aged 62, with the funeral held at All Saints' Church, Cotgrave.

In July 2005 Nottingham Express Transit named Bombardier Incentro AT6/5 tram 214 as Dennis McCarthy MBE.

In 2018 Castle Rock Brewery released a 4.3% London Porter in McCarthy's name.

== Publications ==
- Wilson, Leo C. (1969). Husberg, Kristina; McCarthy, Dennis (eds.). Leo C. Wilson On Dogs. Robert Hale. pp. 1‒223. ISBN 0-7091-0794-3.
- McCarthy, Dennis, ed. (1971). Local Boy Makes Good (A series of 12 transcribed radio interviews conducted by Dennis McCarthy). BBC Radio Nottingham. pp. 1‒134.
- McCarthy, Dennis. BBC Quiz Book.
- McCarthy, Dennis (1977). Boorer, Wendy [in German] (ed.). The Afghan Hound. John Bartholomew and Son. ISBN 0-7028-1054-1.
- McCarthy, Dennis; Marshall, Sandi; McDougall, Alastair; Jones, Valerie; Gaunt, Freddie; Lilley, John; Gall, Ian; Holmes, John (28 July 1977). The Royal Visit to Nottinghamshire (Vinyl record). Introduction by Ron Coles. BBC Radio Nottingham. Ref: NG-1.
- McCarthy, Dennis (1982). The Cocker Spaniel. John Bartholomew and Son. ISBN 0-7028-8370-0.
- Cruft, Charles (1983). Cruft's Dog Book. Foreword by Dennis McCarthy. W. Foulsham.
- McCarthy, Dennis (1992). Woolly Jumper: The true story of an eccentric Irish Water Spaniel. Illustrated by Pete Dredge. Sutton-in-Ashfield: Rainbow Press. ISBN 978-0-9518266-1-4.
- McCarthy, Dennis (1993). Coles, Bob (ed.). Portrait Of A City - Nottingham. Original Music: Bob Rowe; Camera: Tara McCarthy, Bob Cles, Justin Day, Mike Ward, Edward Judd, Martin Day, Dennis McCarthy – via Youtube.
- McCarthy, Dennis. The Good Old Days Quiz Book.
- McCarthy, Dennis (September 1994). Gone to the Dogs (Autobiography). Printed by Mastaprint. Dennis McCarthy, Buggins Cottage, Bingham. ISBN 0-9524236-1-8.
