= List of ambassadors of the Philippines to Canada =

Ambassador of the Republic of the Philippines to Canada
- Sugo ng Republika ng Pilipinas sa Canada; Ambassadeur de la République des Philippines auprès du Canada
- Seal of the Department of Foreign Affairs of the Philippines
- Incumbent; Jose Victor V. Chan-Gonzaga since 15 September 2025
- Department of Foreign Affairs; Embassy of the Philippines, Ottawa
- Style: His Excellency
- Reports to: Department of Foreign Affairs
- Seat: Ottawa, Canada
- Nominator: Secretary of Foreign Affairs
- Appointer: President of the Philippines; with the advice and consent of the Commission on Appointments
- Term length: No fixed term
- Inaugural holder: Privado G. Jimenez
- Formation: 1 March 1971
- Website: Philippine Embassy, Ottawa

The ambassador of the Republic of the Philippines to Canada (Filipino: Sugo ng Republika ng Pilipinas sa Canada; Canadian French: Ambassadeur de la République des Philippines auprès du Canada) is the Republic of the Philippines' foremost diplomatic representative in Canada. As head of the Philippines' diplomatic mission there, the ambassador is the official representative of the president and the government of the Philippines to the governor-general and government of Canada. The position has the rank and status of an ambassador extraordinary and plenipotentiary and is based at the embassy located in Ottawa, with consulates located in Calgary, Toronto, and Vancouver.

== List of representatives ==
| Head of mission | Tenure | Remark(s) |
|---|---|---|
| Privado G. Jimenez | 1971–1978 | He later served as ambassador to Singapore from 1978 to 1985. |
| Ramon V. Del Rosario | 1978–1984 | He later served as ambassador to the then-West Germany and Japan. |
| Petronila P. Garcia | 2014–2020 | Appointed to the position by the President on 24 January 2014, with confirmation by the Commission on Appointments on 12 March. |
| Rodolfo D. Robles | 2020–2022 | Appointed to the position by the President on 21 February 2020, with confirmation by the Commission on Appointments on 11 March. Credentials were virtually presented on 30 November 2020. |
| Maria Andrelita S. Austria | 2022–2025 | Appointed to the position by the President on 8 November 2022, with confirmation by the Commission on Appointments a month later. Credentials were presented on 8 May 2023. |
| Jose Victor V. Chan-Gonzaga | 2025– | Appointed to the position by the President on 23 January 2025, with confirmation by the Commission on Appointments thirteen days later. Credentials were presented on 15 September 2025. |
Source: Embassy of the Republic of the Philippines, Ottawa

== See also ==
- List of ambassadors of Canada to the Philippines
