= 103.8 FM =

FM radio frequency

The following radio stations broadcast on FM frequency 103.8 MHz:

== United Kingdom ==
- BBC Radio Nottingham in South Nottinghamshire
- BBC Radio Solent in West Dorset
- BBC Three Counties Radio in South Bedfordshire, Mid Buckinghamshire and West Hertfordshire
- Mid Sussex Radio in Burgess Hill
