= Oliver Hall (YPG fighter) =

British volunteer with the Kurdish YPG militia

- Born: 28 October 1993; Gosport, Hampshire, England
- Died: 25 November 2017 (aged 24); Raqqa, Syria
- Other name: Canşêr Zagros
- Military career
- Allegiance: Rojava
- Branch: People's Defense Units (YPG)
- Service years: 2017

Oliver Hall (28 October 1993 – 25 November 2017) was a British volunteer with the Kurdish YPG militia who fought against ISIL in Syria from August 2017 until his death in Raqqa on 25 November 2017 while clearing mines from the city.

Hall, who was 24, was from Portsmouth. He attended Bay House School, in Gosport, Hampshire, and then Fareham College, where he trained to be a telecommunications engineer. He had no prior military training before travelling to Syria.

According to Mark Campbell of the Kurdish Solidarity Campaign, he was killed by "an explosion of ordnance left by Daesh [Isis] after the liberation of the city." A Kurdish Solidarity Campaign statement noted that "Oliver fell taking part in humanitarian work, underlining the volunteers' dedication not just to the fight against Islamic State but to the creation of a new and better future for the people of Raqqa".

In a video of Hall which was recorded to be released in the event of his death, he said: "I came here of my own free will, knowing the risks and consequences that can follow." Hall became the fourth British volunteer fighter killed in the operation to clear Raqqa since July 2017.

Former soldier and friend of Hall, Kevin Benton, told The Times that, “He wanted to be at the front and wanted to be right where the action was, and he wasn’t scared to go.”

Using Hall's nom-de-guerre, the YPG stated that "During the combing and clearing of the city, one of our international fighters, Jan Shire [Canşêr Zagros], martyred on 25 November 2017, as a result of a mine explosion."

Hall's death came a month after the death of fellow Briton Jac Holmes, a sniper from Bournemouth, who fought with the YPG since January 2015.
