= List of ambassadors of Canada to the Philippines =

Ambassador of Canada to the Philippines
- Incumbent; David Hartman since November 4, 2022
- Seat: Embassy of Canada, Manila
- Nominator: Prime Minister of Canada
- Appointer: Governor General of Canada
- Term length: At His Majesty's pleasure
- Inaugural holder: Frank Borden Clark
- Formation: August 10, 1972
- Website: Official website of the Canadian Embassy, Manila (English)

The ambassador of Canada to the Philippines is the official representative of the Canadian government to the government of the Philippines. The official title for the ambassador is Ambassador Extraordinary and Plenipotentiary of Canada to the Philippines. The ambassador of Canada to the Philippines is David Hartman, who was appointed on the advice of Prime Minister Justin Trudeau on November 4, 2022.

The Embassy of Canada is located at Levels 6–8, Tower 2, RCBC Plaza, 6819 Ayala Avenue, Makati City, Metro Manila, Philippines 1200.

== List of Canadian ambassadors to the Philippines ==
No.	Name	Term of office			Career	Prime Minister nominated by	Ref.
No.	Name	Start Date	PoC.	End Date	Career	Prime Minister nominated by	Ref.
–	Frank Borden Clark (Chargé d'Affaires)	August 10, 1972		August 27, 1973	Career	Pierre Trudeau (1968–1979 & 1980–1984)	
1	Frank Borden Clark	July 3, 1973	August 21, 1973	September 4, 1975	Career	Pierre Trudeau (1968–1979 & 1980–1984)	
2	John Arnold Irwin	July 17, 1975	October 29, 1975	July 16, 1979	Career	Pierre Trudeau (1968–1979 & 1980–1984)	
3	Edward Lucien Bobinski	April 4, 1979	July 30, 1979	August 24, 1983	Career	Pierre Trudeau (1968–1979 & 1980–1984)	
4	Reginald Hardy Dorrett	October 13, 1983	November 15, 1983	February 19, 1986	Career	Pierre Trudeau (1968–1979 & 1980–1984)	
5	Russell H. Davidson	February 20, 1986	March 25, 1986	August 1, 1989	Career	Brian Mulroney (1984–1993)	
6	André S. Simard	August 24, 1989	September 21, 1989	July 19, 1993	Career	Brian Mulroney (1984–1993)	
7	Stephen Heeney	July 23, 1993	September 13, 1993	September 8, 1997	Career	Kim Campbell (1993)	
8	John Treleaven	July 10, 1997	October 9, 1997	July 15, 2000	Career	Jean Chrétien (1993–2003)	
9	Robert Collette	July 26, 2000	September 20, 2000	August 26, 2003	Career	Jean Chrétien (1993–2003)	
10	Peter Sutherland	July 31, 2003	September 5, 2003		Career	Jean Chrétien (1993–2003)	
11	Robert Desjardins	August 31, 2007	September 14, 2007		Career	Stephen Harper (2006–2015)	
12	Christopher Thornley	August 10, 2010	September 9, 2010	August 2013	Career	Stephen Harper (2006–2015)	
13	Neil Reeder	July 10, 2013	December 2, 2013	August 2016	Career	Stephen Harper (2006–2015)	
14	John T. Holmes	August 10, 2016	December 6, 2016	August 23, 2019	Career	Justin Trudeau (2015–2025)	
15	Peter MacArthur	February 6, 2020	June 21, 2020	September 30, 2022	Career	Justin Trudeau (2015–2025)	
16	David Hartman	November 4, 2022	January 31, 2023		Career	Justin Trudeau (2015–2025)	
Source: Global Affairs Canada

== See also ==
- List of ambassadors of the Philippines to Canada
