= John Holm (disambiguation) =

John Holm is a Canadian politician.

John Holm may also refer to:

- John Cecil Holm, American dramatist
- John A. Holm, American academic
- John Holm, a pseudonym of Tom Shippey, British academic and writer (b. 1943)

== See also ==
- John Holmes (disambiguation)
