= John Lescroart =

American author (born 1948)

- Born: January 14, 1948 (age 78); Houston, Texas, U.S.
- Education: UC Santa Cruz (1966); College of San Mateo (1967); University of San Francisco (1967–68); UC Berkeley (1968–70), AB English Literature with Honors.
- Occupation: Novelist
- Writing career
- Language: English
- Genres: Thriller; mystery; suspense; /egal thriller
- Notable works: The Thirteenth Juror, The Hunt Club, Damage
- Notable awards: The Joseph Henry Jackson Award, 2007 American Author Medal
- Website: www.johnlescroart.com

John Lescroart (/lɛsˈkwɑː/; born January 14, 1948) is a New York Times bestselling author known for his series of legal and crime thriller novels featuring the characters Dismas Hardy, Abe Glitsky, and Wyatt Hunt. His novels have sold more than 10 million copies, have been translated into 22 languages in more than 75 countries, and 18 of his books have been on the New York Times bestseller list.

== Early life and education ==
Lescroart was born in Houston, Texas, and graduated from Junípero Serra High School in San Mateo, California (Class of 1966). He earned a B.A. in English with Honors at UC Berkeley in 1970.

== Career ==
Before becoming a full-time writer in 1994, Lescroart was a self-described "Jack of all trades", who worked as a word processor for law firms as well as a bartender, moving man, house painter, editor, advertising director, computer programmer, and fundraising executive.

Through his 20s, he was also a full-time singer-songwriter-guitarist, and performed under the name Johnny Capo, with Johnny Capo and his Real Good Band.

In addition to more than 20 novels, Lescroart has written several screenplays.

He is an original founding member of the group International Thriller Writers.

== In other media ==
He appeared as a contestant on the game show Tic Tac Dough in 1979, as well as on The Joker's Wild, Blank Check, and Headline Chasers.

Additionally, under Crow Art Records, Lescroart has released several albums, including a CD of piano versions of his songs performed by Antonio Gala. He has for some time been writing and living in Davis, California.

== Awards and honors ==
Lescroart's first novel, Sunburn (1981), won the San Francisco Foundation's Joseph Henry Jackson Award for best as yet unpublished novel by a California author, beating Anne Rice's Interview With the Vampire. Dead Irish (1989) and The 13th Juror (1994) were nominees for the Shamus and Anthony Awards for Best Mystery Novel, respectively; additionally The 13th Juror is included in the International Thriller Writers publication "100 Must-Read Thrillers Of All Time." Hard Evidence (1993) is named in The Complete Idiot's Guide to the Ultimate Reading List. His novel Guilt (1997) was a Reader's Digest Select Edition choice. The Mercy Rule (1998), Nothing But the Truth (2000), and The Suspect (2007) have been major market Book Club selections. The Suspect was also the 2007 One Book Sacramento choice of the Sacramento Library Foundation, and was chosen by the American Author's Association as its 2007 Book of the Year. Damage (2011) made Entertainment Weekly's "Must List."

In 2007, Lescroart was awarded the American Author Medal for The Suspect. In 2008, he was part of the California Library Laureates, in association with the California State Assembly. He has twice been the spotlighted guest at the International Thriller Writer's Thrillerfest, and in 2012, he was the guest of honor at Left Coast Crime.

In 1998, he appeared in The Best American Mystery Stories, edited by Sue Grafton, for "The Adventure of the Giant Rat of Sumatra".

Libraries Unlimited has included Lescroart in its publication The 100 Most Popular Thriller and Suspense Authors.

Eighteen of John Lescroart's novels have been on The New York Times Best Seller list.

== Bibliography ==
=== Auguste Lupa series ===
[It is strongly hinted in these books that Lupa (the son of Sherlock Holmes and Irene Adler) later becomes Nero Wolfe, although Wolfe is never mentioned by name.]

1. Son of Holmes (Donald I. Fine, 1986) ISBN 0-917657-64-0
2. Rasputin's Revenge (Donald I. Fine, 1987) ISBN 1-55611-011-1

=== Dismas Hardy (featured protagonist) ===
Lescroart's most popular works are a series of legal and crime dramas taking place in and around San Francisco, beginning with the thriller Dead Irish. They center around the adventures of ex-cop/lawyer Dismas Hardy and his best friend, officer Abe Glitsky, among many other friends and associates. His newest works introduce Wyatt Hunt, working as a private investigator. Although they are often performing together in the story, the books can be distinguished by which character is the main protagonist. Hardy's daughter, Rebecca, first appears as the main character in the novel The Fall, following her graduation from law school and joining Hardy's law firm as an associate attorney.

1. Dead Irish (Donald I. Fine, 1989) ISBN 1-55611-159-2
2. The Vig (Donald I. Fine, 1990) ISBN 1-55611-221-1
3. Hard Evidence (Donald I. Fine, 1993) ISBN 1-55611-344-7
4. The 13th Juror (Donald I. Fine, 1994) ISBN 1-55611-402-8
5. The Mercy Rule (Delacorte, 1998) ISBN 0-385-31658-5
6. Nothing But the Truth (Delacorte, 1999) ISBN 0-385-33353-6
7. The Hearing (Dutton, 1999) ISBN 0-525-94575-X
8. The Oath (Dutton, 2002) ISBN 0-525-94576-8
9. The First Law (Dutton, 2003) ISBN 0-525-94705-1
10. The Second Chair (Dutton, 2004) ISBN 0-525-94775-2
11. The Motive (Dutton, 2004) ISBN 0-525-94844-9
12. Betrayal (Dutton, 2007) ISBN 978-0-525-95039-4
13. A Plague of Secrets (Dutton, 2009) ISBN 978-0-525-95092-9
14. The Ophelia Cut (Atria Books 2013) ISBN 978-1476709154
15. The Keeper (Atria, 2014) ISBN 978-1476709185
16. Poison (Atria, 2018) ISBN 978-1501115707
17. The Rule of Law (Atria, 2019) ISBN 978-1501115738
18. The Missing Piece (Atria, 2022) ISBN 978-1982170493

=== Rebecca Hardy (featured protagonist) ===
1. The Fall (Atria, 2015) ISBN 978-1476709215

=== Abe Glitsky (featured protagonist) ===
1. A Certain Justice (Donald I. Fine, 1995) ISBN 1-55611-445-1
2. Guilt (Delacorte, 1996) ISBN 0-385-31655-0
3. Damage (Dutton, 2011) ISBN 0-525-95176-8

The events of A Certain Justice happen chronologically between Parts IV and V of Guilt. Lescroart wrote A Certain Justice before Guilt, and in the course of writing it, he came up with Wes Farrell's account of the trial that made him lose faith in the law. After finishing Justice, he decided Guilt would go both backwards and forwards and tell the whole story of Mark Dooher.

=== Wyatt Hunt ===
1. The Hunt Club (Dutton, 2005) ISBN 0-525-94914-3
2. Treasure Hunt (Dutton, 2010)
3. The Hunter (Dutton, 2012) ISBN 0-525-95256-X

=== Gina Roake ===
- The Suspect (Dutton, 2007) ISBN 978-0-525-94998-5

=== Stand-alone books (no featured protagonist) ===
- Sunburn (Pinnacle, 1981) ISBN 0-523-41187-1
- Fatal (Atria, 2017) ISBN 978-1501115677
