= Herdle White =

Jamaican radio presenter and producer

- Born: Jamaica
- Presenting career
- Station: BBC Radio Leicester
- Style: Radio presenter
- Country: United Kingdom

Herdle White is a former African-Caribbean radio presenter and producer. He is best known for his ‘Reggae and Soca’ music programmes for BBC Radio Leicester.

== Life ==
White was born in Jamaica. He is married and lives in Leicester, England.

== Career ==
White joined BBC Radio Leicester in 1968. He was originally asked to present a five-minute Caribbean programme, which later turned into various differently named shows including ‘Reggae and Soca’. He is the longest serving African-Caribbean presenter on the BBC. In 2017, White was reawarded for his outstanding contribution to Local Radio.

He retired from the station on 26 May 2023 after 55 years of broadcasting. Staff at the radio station threw a party for White to celebrate his achievements.
