= Jonathan Holmes =

Jonathan Holmes may refer to:

- Jonathan Holmes (journalist), (born circa 1948), British-born Australian television journalist and producer
- Jon Holmes, Jonathan Holmes, (born 1973), British radio writer, producer, presenter
- Jonathan Holmes (theatre director) (born 1975), British theatre director and writer
- Jonathan Holmes (basketball) (born 1992), American basketball player

== See also ==
- John Holmes (disambiguation)
