= Leeds Co-operative Society =

The Leeds Industrial Co-operative Society (Leeds Co-op) was a British independent co-operative society based in Leeds, West Yorkshire, which merged with United Co-operatives in 2007.

Leeds Co-op was founded in 1847 as a Co-operative Flour Mill Society, workers at Benyon & Co's flax spinning mill raising funds through instalments to acquire some land. One of the founders was John Holmes, a draper. By the end of the year the co-op was selling flour cheaply to its members and the price of flour in the Borough of Leeds was lowered considerably. A mill, The People's Mill, was built in Leeds, just opposite Marshall's Mill, but has since been demolished.

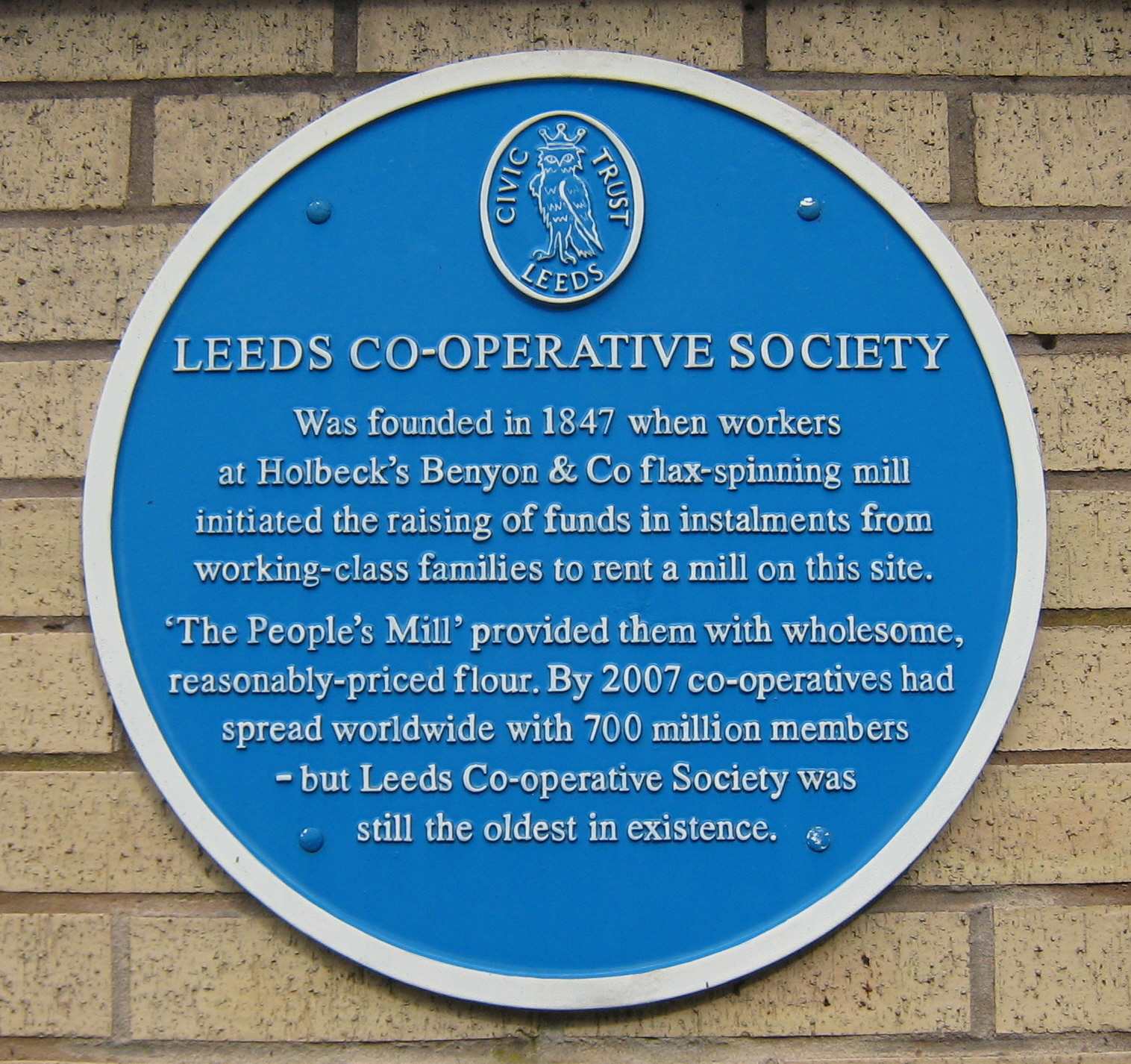
Leeds Co-operative Society blue plaque 2018

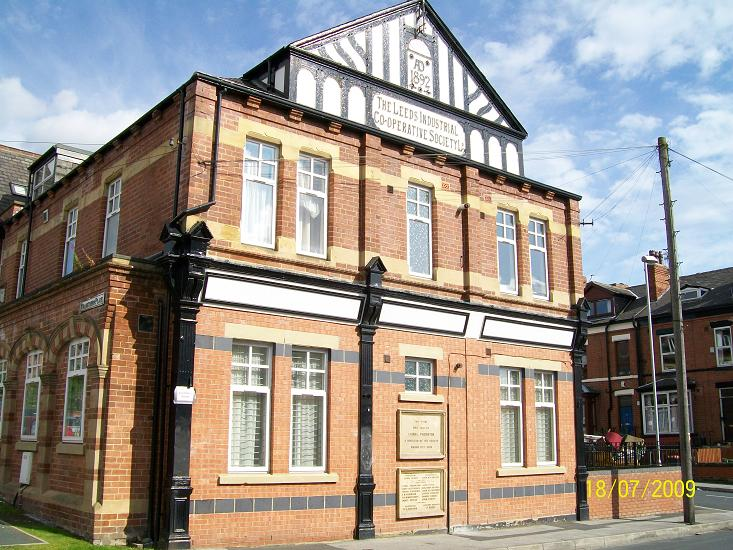
Hyde Park Store

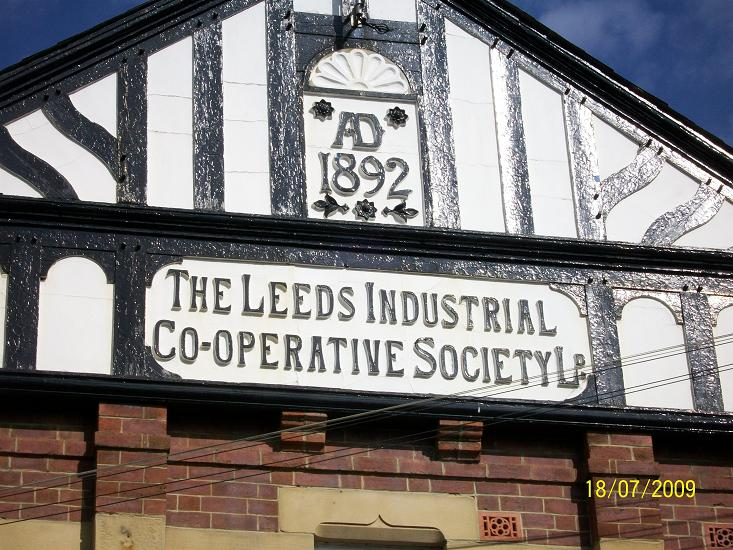
Hyde Park Store Close Up

By the 1860s it was the country's largest co-operative society and it became the City's major retailer. Although it started as a flour miller, the society soon diversified into food and non-food retailing. By late 2006 Leeds Co-op was the oldest independent society in Britain, one of the largest businesses in Leeds., and the 19th largest co-operative Society in the United Kingdom, as other societies merged.

At its merger with United, the society stood at over 700 employees and 21,000 members, trading at twenty-one food supermarkets, seventeen travel agencies, eighteen funeral homes, six optical units and a large property portfolio in West Yorkshire. It was a shareholder of the Co-operative Group and traded using the “Co-op” brand.

In December 2006, Leeds members voted to merge the society with United Co-operatives, the second largest society in the UK, subject to a further vote on 8 January 2007. The members voted once again for merger, and Leeds Society ceded their assets to United in mid January 2007. Later in 2007, United merged with the Co-operative Group.

== See also ==
- Co-operative Group
