= Rodolfo Robles (lawyer) =

Filipino lawyer and diplomat

Rodolfo "Rudy" Dia Robles (born July 1, 1943) is a Filipino lawyer and diplomat who was the Ambassador of the Philippines to Canada from 2020 to 2022. He was appointed by President Rodrigo Duterte on February 21, 2020, and was confirmed by the Commission on Appointments on March 11. He was previously nominated to be the Permanent Representative of the Philippines to the United Nations and was a member of Duterte's Consultative Committee to review the 1987 Constitution of the Philippines.

== Early life and education ==
Robles was born on July 1, 1943, to former Quezon Governor Claro Robles, Sr. and Amparo Dia.

He studied law at San Beda University and graduated in 1967. He then placed first in the bar examinations conducted that year. He also holds a master's degree in law from Harvard University.

== Career ==
Robles served as a delegate to the 1971 Philippine Constitutional Convention as a representative of the 1st district of Quezon. At 27, he was the third youngest member of the convention. He was chairman of the Committee on Constitutional Bodies which initially studied offices like the Civil Service Commission, Commission on Elections, Commission on Audit, among others.

He is the author of the Miranda doctrine and the Constitutional Rights of an Accused under custodial investigation. He earned the moniker "Father of Filipino Ombudsman or Tanodbayan" because he authored the law creating the Office of the Ombudsman during the term of Ferdinand Marcos in 1978.

In 1977, he was one of the founding deans of the Arellano University School of Law and as such, was the youngest law dean in the country at that time. He was also a Professor of Law at San Beda College. He practiced general law with the Robles, Brillante, Ricafrente and Aguirre law firm.

Following the retirements of Supreme Court associate justices Alicia Austria-Martinez and Dante Tiñga in 2009, Robles was recommended to the Judicial and Bar Council by the Supreme Court as a candidate to fill-up one of the vacancies. He was previously disqualified in 2008 due to his age because the rules in force at that time required nominees not from the judiciary to be able to serve in the Supreme Court for at least five years before reaching the mandatory retirement age of 70. Robles would have only served for 4 years and 6 months as a justice which was below the minimum five years according to the rules. In 2009 though, the "five-year rule" was scrapped by the council thus Robles became eligible as a Supreme Court justice nominee. In the end, he was not appointed.

In 2012, he was nominated for Chief Justice following the impeachment of Renato Corona but he declined.

On January 23, 2018, Robles was appointed by President Duterte as a member of the Consultative Committee tasked on reviewing the 1987 Constitution of the Philippines. He served until August 19.

On July 1, 2019, Robles was nominated by Duterte to be the Permanent Representative of the Philippines to the United Nations, a post vacant for almost a year due to the appointment of former Permanent Representative Teodoro Locsin Jr. as Secretary of Foreign Affairs. His nomination, though, was deferred by the Commission on Appointments after being grilled on several issues, including the country's arbitral award over the South China Sea dispute. Senator Panfilo Lacson later claimed that some of his answers "disappointed the members of the foreign affairs committee".

On February 21, 2020, Robles was again nominated by Duterte to another diplomatic post, this time as the Ambassador to Canada. His nomination was approved and confirmed by the Commission on Appointments on March 11. He succeeded Ambassador Petronila Garcia who was appointed in 2014. He arrived in Canada on October 17, 2020, and presented his credentials to Governor General Julie Payette on November 30 in a virtual ceremony due to the COVID-19 pandemic.

== Personal life ==
He is married to Nora San Buenaventura.

In 1974, he was also chosen as one of The Outstanding Young Men (TOYM) awardees in law.
