= Skcin computer tan hoax =

2009 internet hoax

The Skcin computer tan hoax was a hoax website set up by skin cancer charity Skcin in 2009 to spread awareness about skin cancer through the Internet. The fake company was promoted by leaflets, street marketing and online ads, and purported to offer an "online tanning service" where the user's computer monitor could be calibrated to emit ultraviolet tanning rays.

== History ==
The site was launched on 3 February 2009, and originally planned to run for seven days. It received more than 30,000 hits in the first 24 hours and over 1 million hits in the first two months. The premise of the hoax is that the website tricked users into thinking that software downloaded from the website would recalibrate the user's computer monitor or mobile phone to produce ultraviolet rays, after promising to give the user a skin analysis. Described as a "revolutionary new online tanning service" that promises an all-year tan, upon activating the "five-minute free tan trial", bars from a sunbed flash on the screen followed by the message "Don't be fooled, UV exposure can kill", and then by images depicting the victims of sun damage.

The advertisement was shown on 75 screens in 11 stations on the London Underground, where it was projected to be seen by up to 1.7 million commuters. It was also seeded online, where several bloggers joined in on the hoax. In response to the number of hits received by the website, a spokesperson for the charity described it as "an astonishing response [which] has undoubtedly helped raise awareness of the dangers of skin cancer".

Skcin was set up in memory of Karen Clifford, a resident of Nottingham, England, who died of skin cancer in 2005.
