= John Holmes (essayist) =

John Holmes (1815–1894) was a radical campaigner in the city of Leeds in the mid 19th Century. A prosperous draper by profession, he was nevertheless very active in campaigning for workers' rights and was instrumental in founding the Leeds Co-operative Society (President 1862–64) and its precursor, the People's Flour Mill. His writing on the value of cooperatives attracted attention from major figures such as Edwin Chadwick, who cited his work, and John Stuart Mill, with whom he corresponded.

Holmes's essays argue that the costs and quality of the co-op bread compared favourably with the private sector due to economies of scale and saving marketing costs and it provided a way to avoid adulteration of flour. On reading a paper sent to him Mill wrote:

"Your success & that of the Rochdale Association proves that there are at least two bodies of workpeople to be found who are sufficiently free from shortsighted selfishness—for that is really all that is required—to be capable of succeeding in such an enterprise, and the results, economically considered, as exhibited in your paper, are so advantageous that they can hardly fail to call forth imitators"

Other correspondents included John Ruskin and Holmes' name is also recorded as a correspondent of Marx's International Workingmen's Association, the First International.

He wrote on the history of Leeds and was a contributor to "Old Yorkshire".

He was also a serious antiquarian and collected antiquities on an expedition to the Near East. This trip followed the death in 1881 of his first wife. His collection was later acquired by the Leeds City Museum and is now in Abbey House. He also sponsored archeological digs by his friend Thomas Backhouse Sandwith, Vice Consul in Cyprus.

There were no surviving children from his first wife Sarah Ann (née Dale, d. 1881) who he had married in 1839, but he subsequently married Ada Higgins with whom he had two sons: Samuel (b. 1883) and Alfred (b. 1887).
