= Rodney Holmes =

English cricketer (1924–1980)

Personal information
- Full name: John Rodney Reay Holmes
- Born: 24 February 1924; Hollington, Sussex, England
- Died: 3 February 1980 (aged 55); Breuil-Cervinia, Aosta, Italy
- Batting: Right-handed
- Role: Wicket-keeper
- Relatives: Jack Holmes (father)

Domestic team information
- Years: Team
- 1950–1951: Sussex

Career statistics
| Competition | First-class |
|---|---|
| Matches | 3 |
| Runs scored | 41 |
| Batting average | 10.25 |
| 100s/50s | 0/0 |
| Top score | 24 |
| Catches/stumpings | 6/1 |
- Source: Cricinfo, 15 January 2012

John Rodney Reay Holmes (24 April 1924 – 3 February 1980) was an English cricketer. A right-handed batsman and wicket-keeper, he was born at Hollington, Sussex, and educated at Repton School. After leaving Repton, Holmes enlisted in 1943 as a war-substantive officer with the Rifle Brigade. In April 1944 he received the temporary rank of Lieutenant, and in March 1946 he was granted the full rank of second lieutenant with seniority from 7 April 1945. He was promoted to lieutenant in October 1946. Holmes made his first-class debut for the Free Foresters against Oxford University in 1949. He appeared for Sussex for the first time the following season, also against Oxford University. Competition for the wicket-keeping position from Jim Parks limited his opportunities, and he played only one further first-class match, in 1951, again at Oxford. All three of Holmes’s first-class matches were played at University Parks. In three innings he scored 41 runs at an average of 10.25, with a highest score of 24. As a wicket-keeper he took six catches and made one stumping.

In May 1951, Holmes gained the rank of Captain. He retired from service on 16 August 1954, upon which he was granted the honorary rank of Major. He died in an avalanche at Breuil-Cervinia in Italy on 3 February 1980, alongside three other British tourists. His father, Jack, also played first-class cricket for Sussex.
