= Malt Cross =

Music hall in Nottingham, England

Coordinates: 52.9531°N 1.1524°W

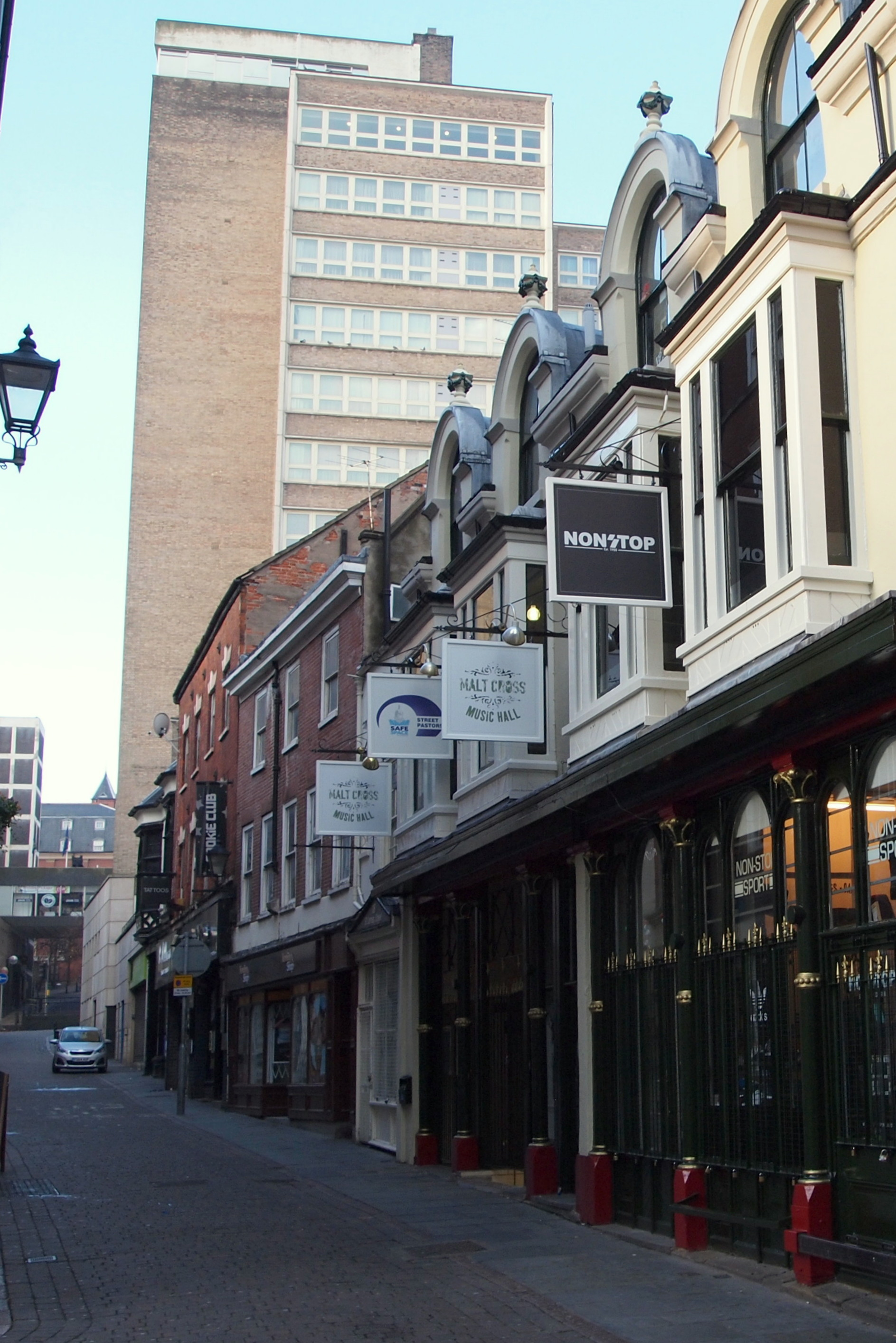
The Malt Cross on St James Street

The Malt Cross is a building in Nottingham, England. It is situated on St James Street in Nottingham city centre, off the Old Market Square. The building was built in 1877 and is one of only a few Victorian music halls still standing. It was a café bar that hosted live music events until its closure on 18 July 2018.

On 15 August 2018 it was announced that the Malt Cross would re-open in September as a result of a new partnership between the existing trustees and the Nottinghamshire YMCA.

The building takes its name from a monument that used to be in the market square and was a gathering place for many people. William Howie Wylie noted that "John Nelson, a Yorkshire stonemason and one of Wesley's earliest followers, preached once in the market place and once at the Malt Cross."

== History ==
In 1806 the former site of the Malt Cross monument was cleared, being recorded as:

1806. Thursday, 8 May
Malt Cross site
Ordered … that the Ground on which the Malt Cross stood be cleared and repaired … that the Pump be taken away and the Moeny received by the Corporation on the Sale of thee Materials of the Malt Cross be appropriated to Discharge the Expences incurred in the Erecetion lately intended to be placed there;

— Records of the Borough of Nottingham

The Malt Cross was built in 1877. It had previously been an inn named the Roebuck but was bought by Mr Charles Weldon who rebuilt and enlarged the premises.

Mr Charles Weldon only managed the music hall for a few years before the mortgage of £5,500 was foreclosed in 1880. It was then subject to a frequent change of management with Mr William Hulse taking the reins from 1883 – 1889, Mr E.F. Buxenstein for a year in 1891, Mr Arthur B. Johnson for a slightly lengthier period of 1893 – 1900, and then Mr Lewis Thompson Donkersley between 1902 - 1904.

== Architect ==
The man who designed the Malt Cross building as it is seen today was a Mr Edwin Hill. The most impressive part of his design was that of the high-arched glazed roof, the wooden arches of which are built from ten layers of laminated wood on the inner arches and twelve on the outer. This layered design allowed the beams to be bent to the required curve and did away with the usual difficulties of wooden arch design. The layers have no visible nail or bolt holes and it is thought that they are held together by glue alone.

== See also ==
- Listed buildings in Nottingham (Bridge ward)
