= Oliver Hall (politician) =

American politician

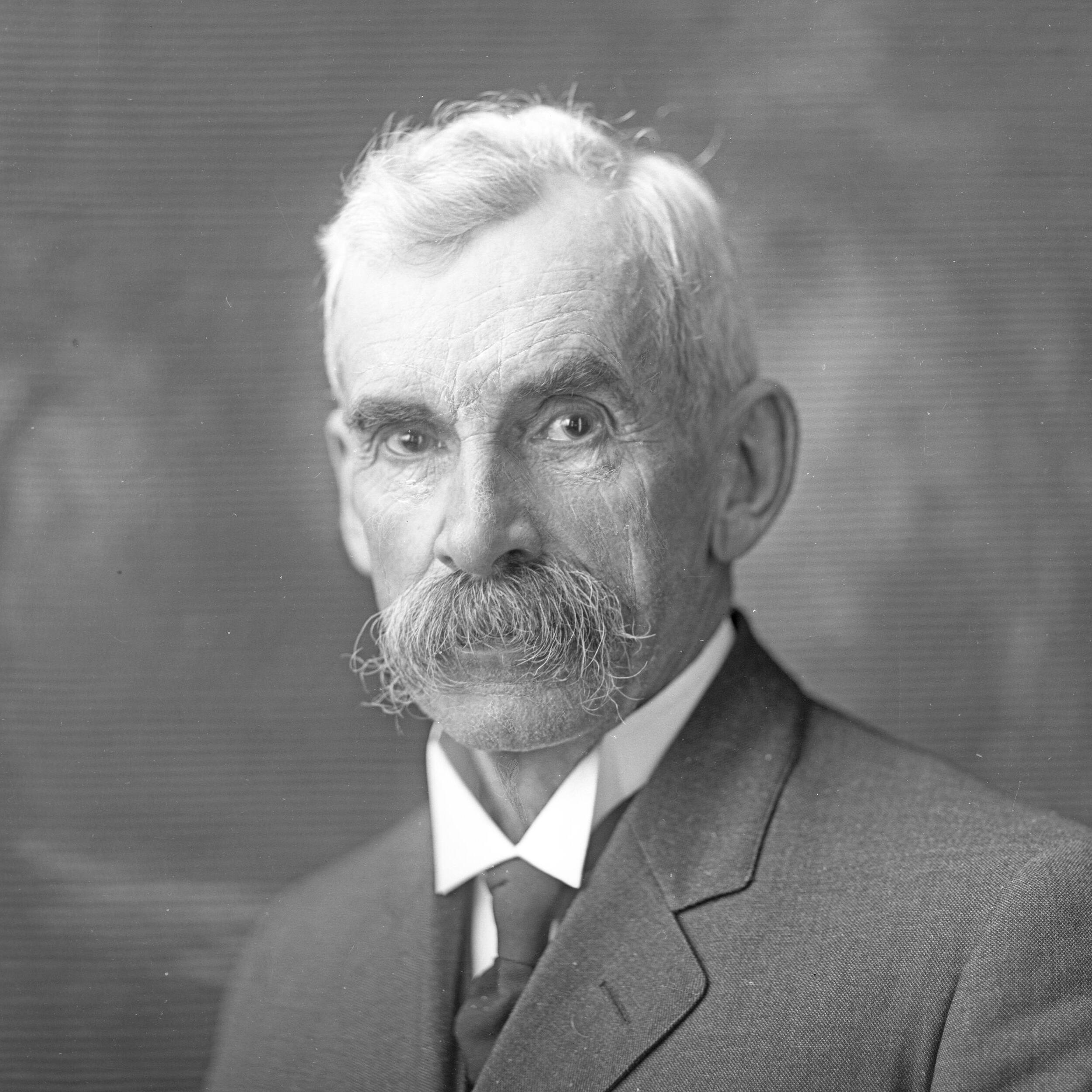
- Hall in 1915

Member of the Washington State Senate
- In office 1895–1902 (7th district); 1911–1932 (8th district)

Personal details
- Born: February 17, 1852 St. Lawrence County, New York, U.S.
- Died: November 25, 1946 (aged 94) Colfax, Washington, U.S.
- Party: Republican

Oliver Hall (February 17, 1852 – November 25, 1946) was an American politician in the state of Washington.

He served in the Washington State Senate for 28 years, from 1895 to 1902 and 1911 to 1932. He was a Republican.
