= Jack Holmes (cricketer) =

English cricketer

Personal information
- Full name: Albert John Holmes
- Born: 30 June 1899; Thornton Heath, Surrey, England
- Died: 21 May 1950 (aged 50); Hollington, Hastings, Sussex, England
- Batting: Right-handed
- Role: Batter, captain
- Relatives: Rodney Holmes, son

Domestic team information
- Years: Team
- 1922–1939: Sussex
- 1930–1932: Royal Air Force
- 1934–1938/39: MCC

Career statistics
Competition	First-class
Matches	208
Runs scored	6,282
Batting average	21.22
100s/50s	6/24
Top score	133*
Balls bowled	757
Wickets	8
Bowling average	53.12
5 wickets in innings	–
10 wickets in match	–
Best bowling	1/2
Catches/stumpings	122/–
- Source: CricketArchive, 8 November 2024

Albert John Holmes (30 June 1899 – 21 May 1950) was an English first-class cricketer who had amateur status. He was a right-handed batsman who rarely bowled and played from 1922 to 1939 for Sussex, captaining the county from 1936 till his retirement. He represented the Royal Air Force cricket team between 1930 and 1932; he was a flight lieutenant in the RAF.

Nicknamed "Sherlock", Holmes also represented Marylebone Cricket Club (MCC) several times in the late 1930s and would have captained the England national cricket team in 1939–40 if MCC's scheduled tour of India had gone ahead. The team had been selected but the outbreak of the Second World War on 1 September 1939 caused the tour's immediate cancellation.

Holmes' final first-class appearance was in the last match to be completed following the outbreak of war, playing for Sussex against Yorkshire at the County Cricket Ground, Hove, from Wednesday 30 August to Friday 1 September. From an overnight position of 330/3 in the first innings, chasing a Sussex score of 387, Yorkshire continued on the Friday morning and totalled 392 all out. Sussex collapsed in their second innings and were all out for only 33, whereupon Yorkshire made 30–1 to win by nine wickets. Holmes scored 11 and 4 in the match, being bowled by Hedley Verity in both innings.

Holmes was born at Thornton Heath, Surrey and died at Hollington, Hastings, Sussex. He made 208 first-class appearances, scoring 6,282 runs @ 21.22 with a highest innings of 133 not out, one of six centuries. He also scored 24 half-centuries, held 122 catches and took 8 wickets. His son Rodney played a handful of games for Sussex in the early 1950s.

== Bibliography ==
- Caple, S. Canynge (1959). England v India: 1886–1959. Worcester: Littlebury & Co. Ltd. ASIN B001EN6QX2. OCLC 451210.
