= John T. Holmes =

Canadian diplomat

John Thomas Holmes is a Canadian diplomat who served as ambassador to the Philippines, Turkey, Indonesia, and Jordan. Born in Ormstown, Quebec, and raised in Hemmingford, a village on the southern border, he was educated at Champlain Regional College in St. Lambert, Quebec and earned degrees in history and political science (1978) and law (1982) from McGill University in Montreal. Holmes is married to Carol Bujeau, a communications specialist and the author of Triple Sex and Other Tales of an Ambassador's Wife, a book about their life abroad. They have two children, Jordan and Kayla.

== Diplomatic career ==
Holmes joined the then Department of External Affairs as a junior diplomat in Bridgetown, Barbados (1983 - 1987). On his return to Ottawa in 1987, Holmes worked in the Department's Legal Bureau on international human rights and humanitarian law issues. He led Canada's delegation to the United Nations committee drafting the Convention on the Rights of the Child, which was adopted in 1989 by the United Nations.

After assignments in Accra, Ghana (1991 - 1993) and in Ottawa (1993 - 1996), Holmes was assigned to Canada's Permanent Mission to the United Nations as Counsellor [Legal Affairs], and he played a role in the elaboration of the Rome Statute of the International Criminal Court, which was established to prosecute those responsible for the crime of genocide, crimes against humanity, and war crimes. While in New York, Holmes played a role in drafting several international anti-terrorism conventions.

In 2003, Holmes was appointed Canadian Ambassador to the Hashemite Kingdom of Jordan, and in 2005, he was appointed nonresident Ambassador to the Republic of Iraq, serving as Canada's first ambassador to Iraq since 1991. Holmes was a member of the Canadian delegation helping to free Canadian hostages, Fadi Fadel, and members of the Christian Peacemakers in 2006.

In 2006, Holmes was appointed Canadian Ambassador to Indonesia with concurrent responsibility for Timor Leste (previously East Timor). In 2009, Holmes became Canada's first Ambassador to the Association of Southeast Asian Nations (ASEAN). Returning to Ottawa, Holmes served as Director General of the Middle East and Maghreb Bureau of the Department of Foreign Affairs and International Trade. In this capacity, Holmes coordinated Canada's response to the Arab Spring.

In 2011, Holmes was appointed Canadian Ambassador to the Republic of Turkey with concurrent responsibilities for Azerbaijan, Georgia, and Turkmenistan. On July 15, 2016, the Turkish capital Ankara and its largest city Istanbul came under attack from an army-led coup attempt. The coup leaders attempted to capture Parliament and other government institutions as well as the offices of leading media organizations. Within 24 hours, the government of President Recep Tayyip Erdogan had crushed the coup and restored order. Holmes led an embassy emergency team working to ensure that Canadians in Turkey were safe. By July 16, Holmes and other ambassadors in Ankara toured the damaged Grand National Assembly of Turkey with the Turkish foreign minister and other ministers.

Holmes was appointed Canadian Ambassador to the Philippines in 2016. Holmes led efforts to resolve the 2019 Canada - Philippines waste dispute, which was a row over mislabeled Canadian garbage shipped to Manila by a recycling company. The dispute threatened to disrupt Canada - Philippines bilateral relations, with the Philippines withdrawing their ambassador from Canada. When Fox News personality Tucker Carlson criticized Prime Minister Justin Trudeau for engaging in "garbage colonialism," Holmes' diplomatic maneuvers received international attention. Following a month of intense negotiations, the 69 containers of Canadian trash left the Philippines and was returned to Canada where the garbage was subsequently destroyed. In 2019, Holmes retired from public service after a 37-year career.

In 2019, Holmes joined the board of Equitas, a human rights organization based in Montreal, and in 2024, he joined the board of Canadian Ambassadors' Alumni Association. In 2025, he was appointed Visiting Fellow at the Western Academy for Advanced Research at the University of Western Ontario.
