= John McClellan Holmes =

John Mcclellan Holmes (January 22, 1834 - June 21, 1911) was a Christian minister and author.

== Career ==
Born in Livingston, New York, Holmes was the son of Edwin Holmes, an eminent minister of the Reformed church, and Sarah McClellan Holmes. Holmes graduated from Williams College in 1853, and from the Theological Seminary of the Reformed Dutch Church at New Brunswick, N.J. in 1857.

Holmes was a minister of the Dutch Reformed Church for forty years, first at the Reformed Church of East Williamsburg, Long Island, from July 1857 to October 1859, then at the Lee Avenue Reformed Church of Brooklyn from 1859 to October 1865, when he was installed over the First Reformed Church, of Hudson, New York. In 1870, he received a D.D. degree from Rutgers College in New Brunswick.

In 1877 he became pastor of the State Street Presbyterian church in Albany, New York. He served as a member of the educational and missionary boards of the Reformed church, president of the general synod in 1876, a delegate to the Pan-Presbyterian council at Edinburg in 1877, moderator of the Presbyterian synod of New York in 1884, and a delegate to the Pan-Presbyterian council at London in 1888 He was a trustee of Auburn Theological Seminary from 1886 to 1900, and director of the Union Theological Seminary in New York from 1888 to 1900. Holmes was at various times an associate editor of the Christian Intelligencer, and was noted to have "contributed largely to the religious press". It was similarly noted that "[m]any of his sermons have been published". Holmes retired in 1897.

== Personal life ==
In May 1860 he married Frances Van Vranken, daughter of Rev. Samuel A. Van Vranken, D. D., with whom he had four children. Frances died on October 30, 1874, and on December 3, 1879, Holmes married Jennie Sanders Van Deusen, daughter of Peter and Susan (Livingston) Van Deusen. He died at Poughkeepsie, New York, and was buried in Hudson, New York.
