= Embassy of the Philippines, Ottawa =

Diplomatic mission of the Philippines in Canada

Embassy of the Philippines, Ottawa Pasuguan ng Pilipinas sa Ottawa Ambassade des Philippines au Ottawa

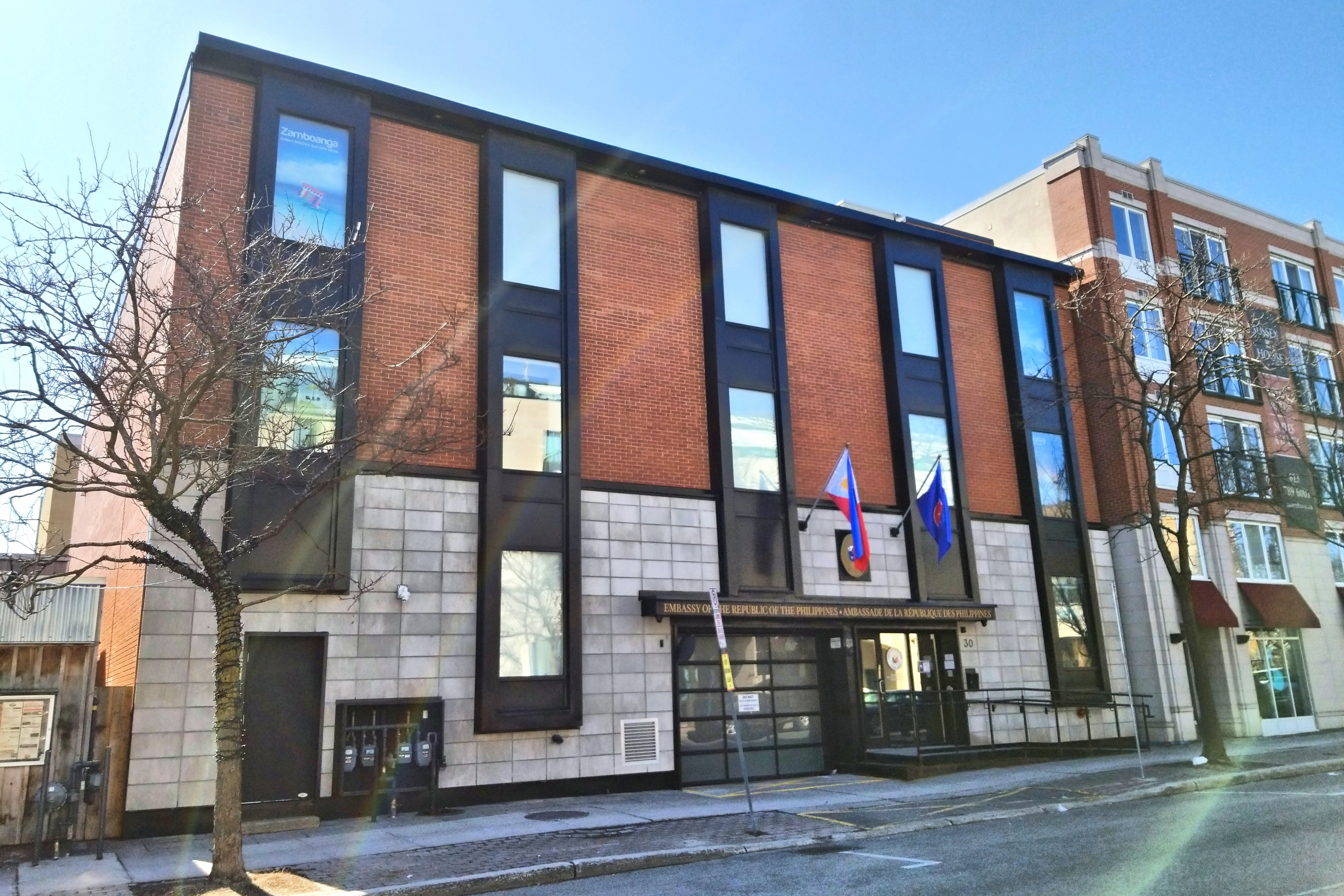
- Location: Ottawa
- Address: 30 Murray Street
- Coordinates: 45°25′44.3″N 75°41′42.4″W
- Ambassador: Jose Victor V. Chan-Gonzaga
- Website: ottawape.dfa.gov.ph

The Embassy of the Philippines in Ottawa is the diplomatic mission of the Republic of the Philippines to Canada. Opened in 1971, it is currently located at 30 Murray Street in the ByWard Market neighbourhood of central Ottawa.

== History ==
The Philippine Embassy in Ottawa was opened on March 1, 1971, with Privado G. Jimenez becoming the first resident Philippine ambassador to Canada. Notably, the embassy is not the first Philippine diplomatic mission in Canada; the Philippine Consulate General in Vancouver is older, dating back to 1956.

Several Filipino diplomats posted to Canada were recalled in May 2019 by Foreign Affairs Secretary Teodoro Locsin Jr., ostensibly to pressure the Canadian government to take action in resolving the Canada–Philippines waste dispute, where several garbage-laden shipping containers were shipped to the Philippines from Canada and had been a sticking point in relations between the two countries for a number of years. The dispute was finally resolved around two weeks later with Canada taking back the containers, and the diplomats were promptly dispatched back to Canada by the Department of Foreign Affairs (DFA) to resume their posts.

== Chancery ==
Since July 1, 2016, the chancery of the Philippine Embassy in Ottawa has been based out of a standalone building at 30 Murray Street, relocating from its previous chancery in the Varette Building at 130 Albert Street in downtown Ottawa, which it had moved into in 2011. The property, previously called the Collectiv Building, was acquired by the Philippine government for this purpose on January 15, 2016.

The current chancery, a three-story structure with some 18,000 square feet (1,700 m^{2}) of floor space, previously housed the studios and offices for radio station CJLL-FM, with the embassy relocating to the building out of the need for more space to conduct its future activities. The consular section is located on the first floor, while the ambassador's office is located on the second floor. The third floor houses event space for the mission's activities, as well as the Ottawa center of the Sentro Rizal — the first in Canada — which opened on May 10, 2018.

A lactation room was opened in the chancery's consular section on March 23, 2026.

== Staff and activities ==
The Philippine Embassy in Ottawa is currently headed by Ambassador Jose Victor V. Chan-Gonzaga, who was appointed to the position by President Bongbong Marcos on January 23, 2025. Prior to his appointment as ambassador, Chan-Gonzaga, a career diplomat, served as the DFA's Assistant Secretary for American Affairs, and prior to that served as consul general at the Philippine Embassy in Washington, D.C. His appointment was confirmed by the Commission on Appointments on February 4, 2025, and he presented his credentials to Governor General Mary Simon on September 15, 2025.

Notable diplomats deployed to the embassy include Francisco Noel Fernandez, who topped the 1994 Philippine Bar Examination and was appointed as its deputy chief of mission in September 2016, and Buenaflor Cruz, who while serving at the embassy was charged in 2014 with human trafficking involving the exploitation of a 26-year-old Filipino woman who was hired as a nanny.

Serving nearly a million Filipino Canadians, many of the embassy's activities centre around fostering continuing relations between Filipinos in Canada and their home country. In 2014, it organized the first annual Winter Escapade, where Filipino Canadians are brought to the Philippines for a week-long tour of the country during the winter months. Organized in cooperation with the other Philippine diplomatic missions in Canada, as well as other government agencies, the first tour generated over C$1 million in economic output, with 60-65 percent of participants taking the trip more than once. It also organizes events in cooperation with the local Filipino community, such as an annual series of Christmas events and contests, and cultural exhibits at the Sentro Rizal.

The embassy exercises consular jurisdiction over eastern Ontario, Quebec and Atlantic Canada, where it services nearly 53,000 Filipinos, more than half of whom are in Quebec.

== See also ==
- Canada–Philippines relations
- List of diplomatic missions of the Philippines
- Filipino Canadians
