= John Holmes (Jamaican politician) =

Jamaican planter and politician (1763–1836)

John Holmes (1763–1836) was a planter and slave-owner in Jamaica. He was elected to the House of Assembly of Jamaica in 1820.
