= Auguste Lupa =

- First appearance: Son of Holmes
- Last appearance: Rasputin's Revenge
- Created by: John Lescroart

In-universe information
- Gender: Male
- Occupation: Spy, detective
- Family: Irene Adler (mother); Sherlock Holmes (father)

Auguste Lupa is a fictional character in two pastiche novels by author John Lescroart. The novels are Son of Holmes (1986) and Rasputin's Revenge (1987).

== Character overview ==
Lupa, a secret agent during the First World War, is the son of Sherlock Holmes and Irene Adler. It is strongly implied that he is the younger version of fictional detective Nero Wolfe in the mystery series by Rex Stout. Auguste Lupa is one of many aliases used by the character. Jules Giraud, the narrator of the books, explains that Lupa always chooses as his alias a first name with a connection to one of the Caesars. Auguste is the name of a Roman emperor and Lupa means "wolf." Other aliases he has used include Julius Adler and Cesar Mycroft. The latter surname indicates a connection to Mycroft Holmes, the brother of Sherlock Holmes. In Rasputin's Revenge it is revealed that his real name is John Hamish Adler Holmes, combining the names of Dr. John Hamish Watson, the best friend of Sherlock Holmes, and Irene Adler's surname with the surname Holmes.

Lupa also shares several of Wolfe's attributes, including a tendency to be overweight, a love for fine cooking, orchids, and beer, distaste for the female sex, and a preference for the color yellow. Like Wolfe, Lupa has a mistress named Anna, whom he treats poorly. Lupa explains to Giraud that he was raised by various relatives in different European countries following the death of his mother in a train accident. He saw his father on holidays.

Author William S. Baring-Gould previously postulated that Nero Wolfe was the son of Sherlock Holmes and Irene Adler in his books Sherlock Holmes of Baker Street (1962) and Nero Wolfe of West Thirty-Fifth Street, the life and times of America's largest private detective (1969). He is also considered the son of Holmes by Philip José Farmer, the creator of the Wold Newton family.

In Son of Holmes, Lupa investigates the murder of an intelligence agent and acts of sabotage in a small French town during World War I. In Rasputin's Revenge he travels to Russia at the request of Tsarina Alexandra and investigates the murder of a relative of Tsar Nicholas II.
