= John Holmes (geographer) =

Emeritus Professor of Geography at the University of Queensland

John H. Holmes is Emeritus Professor of Geography at the University of Queensland.

John Holmes has contributed to the Encyclopædia Britannica and has edited Queensland: A Geographical Interpretation and coedited Settlement Systems in Sparsely Populated Regions. Professor Holmes has also chaired the Australian Academy of Science National Committee of Geography and acted as Australian delegate at various international meetings. He is a Fellow of the Academy of Social Sciences in Australia.

== Selected publications ==
- (1965) The suburbanization of the Cessnock coalfields. Australian Geographical Studies 111 (2), 105–128.
- (1967) Problems in location sampling. Annals: Association of American Geographers, 57 (4), 757-780.
- (1977) Population (pp. 331–353) and The urban system (pp. 412–431). In D.N. Jeans (ed) Australia: A Geography. Sydney, Sydney U.P. (Revised in Australia: A Geography. Vol. 2 Society and Space, (1987), 24-48 and 49–74.
- (1985) Policy issues concerning rural settlement in Australia's pastoral zone, Australian Geographical Studies, 23, 3-27.
- (1990) Ricardo revisited: submarginal land and non-viable cattle enterprises in the Northern Territory Gulf District. Journal of Rural Studies, 6 (1), 45–65.
- (1996) Changing resource values in Australia's tropical savannas: priorities in institutional reform. In: A. Ash, ed. The Future of Tropical Savannas: An Australian Perspective, Melbourne: C.S.I.R.O. 28–43.
- (2000) Pastoral lease tenures as policy instruments: 1847 to 1997. In S. Dovers, ed. Environmental History and Policy: Still Settling Australia, Melbourne: Oxford U.P. 212–242.
- (2002) Diversity and change in Australia's rangelands: a post-productivist transition with a difference? Transactions: Institute of British Geographers 27, 362–384.
- (With K. Hartig and M. Bell) (2002) Locational disadvantage and household locational decisions: changing contexts and responses in the Cessnock district, 1964–1999. Australian Geographical Studies, 40, 300–322.
- (2006) Impulses towards a multifunctional transition in rural Australia: gaps in the research agenda. Journal of Rural Studies, 22, 142–160.
- (2009) Fifty years of disciplinary flux within human geography; changing sociocognitive subdisciplines and subcultures. Australian Geographer 40, 387–408.
- (2010) Divergent regional trajectories in Australia's tropical savannas: indicators of a multifunctional transition. "Geographical Research" 48, 342–358.
- (2012) Cape York Peninsula, Australia: sa frontier region undergoing a multifunctional transition with indigenous engagement. "Journal of Rural Studies" 28, 252–265.

== Selected consultancy reports ==
- (2001) Third-party rights on pastoral leases in South Australia. Report to Pastoral Board Secretariat, S. A. Department of Environment, Heritage and Aboriginal Affairs pp. 44.
- (2003) Incentives for pastoral lessees to enter into Indigenous land use agreements (ILUAs). Report to Aboriginal Legal Rights Movement: South Australia, pp. 65.
- (2005) (with M. Bell and E. Charles-Edwards) Population dynamics in rural and remote Queensland. Report to Queensland Office of Economic Research, Department of Premier and Cabinet, pp. 87.
