= BBC Radio Nottingham =

Coordinates: 52.9497°N 1.1399°W

- Nottingham; England
- Broadcast area: Nottinghamshire
- Frequencies: FM: 95.1 MHz (Newark); FM: 95.5 MHz (Mansfield and Ashfield); FM: 103.8 MHz (Nottingham); DAB: 12C (NOW Nottingham); Freeview: 712
- RDS: BBCNottm

Programming
- Language: English
- Format: Local news, talk and music

Ownership
- Owner: BBC Local Radio, BBC East Midlands

History
- First air date: 31 January 1968
- Former frequencies: 1584 MW

Technical information
- Licensing authority: Ofcom

Links
- Website: BBC Radio Nottingham

BBC Radio Nottingham is the BBC's local radio station serving the county of Nottinghamshire.

It broadcasts on FM, DAB, digital TV and via BBC Sounds from studios on London Road in Nottingham city centre.

According to RAJAR, the station has a weekly audience of 124,000 listeners and a 4.4% share as of December 2023.

== Technical ==
Radio Nottingham is broadcast on three FM frequencies:

- 103.8 to Nottingham and south Nottinghamshire, from Mapperley Ridge in north Nottingham
- 95.5 to Mansfield and Ashfield, from Fishponds Hill
- 95.1 to Newark from Beacon Hill (since January 2004)

The Nottingham signal may be heard as far south as Leicester.

Since 30 April 2004, the station has been available on DAB from the NDEM (NOW Digital East Midlands) Nottingham 12C multiplex from Waltham (main signal and in Leicestershire), Mapperley Ridge and Fishponds Hill (since July 2006).

The station also broadcasts on Freeview TV channel 712 in both the BBC East Midlands region and the BBC Yorkshire and Lincolnshire region and streams online via BBC Sounds.

The station used to broadcast an AM medium wave signal on 1584 kHz, from Clipstone, near Mansfield, until 25 January 2018 when the transmitter was turned off. This followed a trial, to determine if listeners would miss or complain about the loss of services on medium wave, from 17 August to 24 September 2012 when BBC Radio Nottingham stopped broadcasting its programmes on medium wave, instead directing listeners to FM or DAB.

North Nottinghamshire, covering the district of Bassetlaw including the towns of Retford and Worksop, is officially covered by BBC Radio Sheffield on 104.1 FM from the Holme Moss transmitter. Although editorially, news for this area is covered by BBC Radio Nottingham, and FM reception (and to a lesser extent, DAB and Freeview) is possible in these areas.

== Programming ==
Local programming is produced and broadcast from the BBC's Nottingham studios from 6 am to 2 pm on Mondays to Fridays and for sports coverage. The 10 pm to 1 am late show originates from BBC Radio Manchester or BBC Radio London. At weekends and on weekdays afternoons, much of the station's output is simulcast with BBC Radio Derby and BBC Radio Leicester.

During the station's downtime, BBC Radio Nottingham simulcasts overnight programming from BBC Radio 5 Live.

== Presenters ==
=== Former notable presenters ===
- Mansfield's Richard Bacon began his broadcasting career at this station.
- Matthew Bannister, former late night host on BBC Radio 5 Live, worked as a reporter in 1978.
- Comedian Boothby Graffoe had a weekly show for a short time in the late 1980s.
- Chris Hawkins worked at this station after his first station.
- Simon Mayo began his radio career here where he worked for four years in 1982, moving to BBC Radio 1 in May 1986.
- Dennis McCarthy, who continued broadcasting on the station (despite falling ill) until the afternoon he died.
- John Simons worked on the station in the late 1980s. He went on to be the Group Programme Director for GMG Radio.
