= Jack Holmes (rugby league, born 1904) =

Australia international rugby league player

Personal information
- Full name: John James Holmes
- Born: 11 December 1904; Glebe, New South Wales, Australia
- Died: 10 September 1931 (aged 26); Burwood, New South Wales, Australia

Playing information
- Position: Five-eighth
Club
| Years | Team | Pld | T | G | FG | P |
|---|---|---|---|---|---|---|
| 1926 | Western Suburbs | 7 | 3 | 0 | 0 | 9 |
| 1927–31 | Newtown | 45 | 7 | 1 | 0 | 26 |
| | Total | 52 | 10 | 1 | 0 | 35 |
Representative
| Years | Team | Pld | T | G | FG | P |
| 1929–30 | New South Wales | 3 | 1 | 0 | 0 | 3 |
| 1929–30 | Australia | 0 | 0 | 0 | 0 | 0 |

John James Holmes (11 December 1904 – 10 September 1931) was an Australian rugby league player who played in the 1920s and 1930s.

== Career ==
Born at Glebe, New South Wales to parents George and Ellen Holmes in 1904, Holmes was a five-eighth that came from Western Suburbs Magpies in 1926 to Newtown. He spent the next five seasons at Newtown between 1927 and 1931, often as captain. Holmes represented New South Wales on three occasions between 1929–1930 and was then chosen from the 1929–30 Kangaroo Tour, playing in 12 matches. Holmes is listed on the Australian Players Register as Kangaroo No.158. He met and married an English girl, while on tour and returned with her to live in Sydney.

== Death ==
He had completed the 1931 NSWRFL season, when he became ill with appendicitis and died during the operation to remove the infected appendix. Much grief was felt for his wife Mary and his infant daughter Angela, and a benefit match was played on 29 September 1931 at Earl Park, Arncliffe between the Kangaroos and a combined Newtown-Western Suburbs team that raised in excess of £300 for the widow and child. His funeral was attended by many members of the Newtown Rugby League Football Club and other rugby league identities.

Holmes died on 10 September 1931 aged 26, and was buried at the Catholic section of Rookwood Cemetery on 11 September 1931.
