= Jac Holmes =

British volunteer with the Kurdish YPG militia (1993-2017)

- Born: Jac Holmes; January 18, 1993; Poole, Dorset, England, United Kingdom
- Died: October 23, 2017 (aged 24); Raqqa, Syria
- Cause of death: IED (Improvised Explosive Device)
- Military career
- Allegiance: Autonomous Administration of North and East Syria
- Branch: YPG
- Service years: 2015–2017
- Unit: 223 YPG Sniper Unit
- Known for: British volunteer with YPG, Sniper Unit commander, fighting against ISIL
- Conflicts: Syrian Civil War; Battle of Raqqa (2017)

Jac Holmes (18 January 1993 – 23 October 2017) was a British volunteer with the Kurdish YPG militia who fought against ISIL in Syria from January 2015 until his death in Raqqa on 23 October 2017 while clearing mines from the city.

Holmes was a former IT worker and decorator from Poole in Dorset. He had no military experience before travelling to Syria in January 2015, shortly after he turned 22. Holmes did three tours of northern Syria with the YPG and featured regularly in international media about foreign fighters with Kurdish-led forces, including the Channel 4 documentary 'Frontline Fighting: The Brits Battling ISIS'. His death came four days after the Syrian Democratic Forces declared the liberation of Raqqa.

In a Q&A on Facebook on 4 October 2017, Holmes said his reason for travelling to Syria was "Because I was sick of seeing what was going on in Syria, and western nations not doing enough to help"

Josh Walker, another British volunteer with the YPG who was cleared of terrorism charges after returning from fighting in Syria, said Holmes was "A good fighter dedicated to the cause, he learned & spoke the language well - which is unusual in foreign fighters. Among foreigners and Kurds alike he was very popular and a very good man."

Holmes took the Kurdish nom-de-guerre Sores Amanos. 'Sores' means 'revolution' in Kurdish. He was one of the longest serving U.K. foreign fighters when he died.

During the battle for Raqqa, he commanded the four-man 223 YPG Sniper Unit made up of international volunteers from Spain, the US and Germany.

Holmes was killed on 23 October by an IED in Raqqa. He was the sixth British volunteer to be killed while fighting ISIL in Syria.

Hundreds of mourners gathered in Dorset on Friday 2 February 2018 to attend Holmes' funeral. "About 500 people, including family members, friends, British Kurds, the parents of other British men to have died in Syria and about 30 former YPG comrades from across the world" attended the service in Wimborne to pay tribute to Holmes, according to The Guardian. His coffin was covered with flowers in the colours of the YPG and the YPG commander Nuri Mahmud spoke via Skype from Syria to offer his personal condolences and to commend Jac for his contribution to the eradication of ISIS in Raqqa. Following the service, his coffin was taken to Poole Crematorium.
