= BBC Radio Leicester =

Coordinates: 52.635°N 1.138°W

- Leicester; England
- Broadcast area: Leicestershire and Rutland
- Frequencies: FM: 104.9 MHz; DAB: 11B (NOW Leicester); Freeview: 713
- RDS: BBC Leic

Programming
- Language: English
- Format: Local news, talk and music

Ownership
- Owner: BBC Local Radio, BBC East Midlands

History
- First air date: 8 November 1967
- Former frequencies: 95 FM; 837 MW

Technical information
- Licensing authority: Ofcom

Links
- Website: BBC Radio Leicester

BBC Radio Leicester is the BBC's local radio station serving the counties of Leicestershire and Rutland.

It broadcasts on FM, DAB, digital TV and via BBC Sounds from studios at St Nicholas Place in Leicester.

According to RAJAR, the station had a weekly audience of 100,000 listeners as of May 2025.

== History ==
BBC Radio Leicester was the first BBC Local Radio station, launching at 12:45 on 8 November 1967 on 95.05 VHF from a transmitter located on Gorse Hill above the city centre.

In 1976, BBC Radio Leicester started broadcasting shows aimed at Leicester's British Asian community. These were expanded in 1989 to include the West Midlands and eventually formed the basis of the nationwide BBC Asian Network.

In 2007, the station celebrated its 40th anniversary by launching a Ruby Rainbow Appeal in aid of the Rainbows Hospice based in Loughborough, within its TSA (total survey area). Special events took place throughout the year culminating in a final fundraising appeal around the time of the anniversary in November 2007.

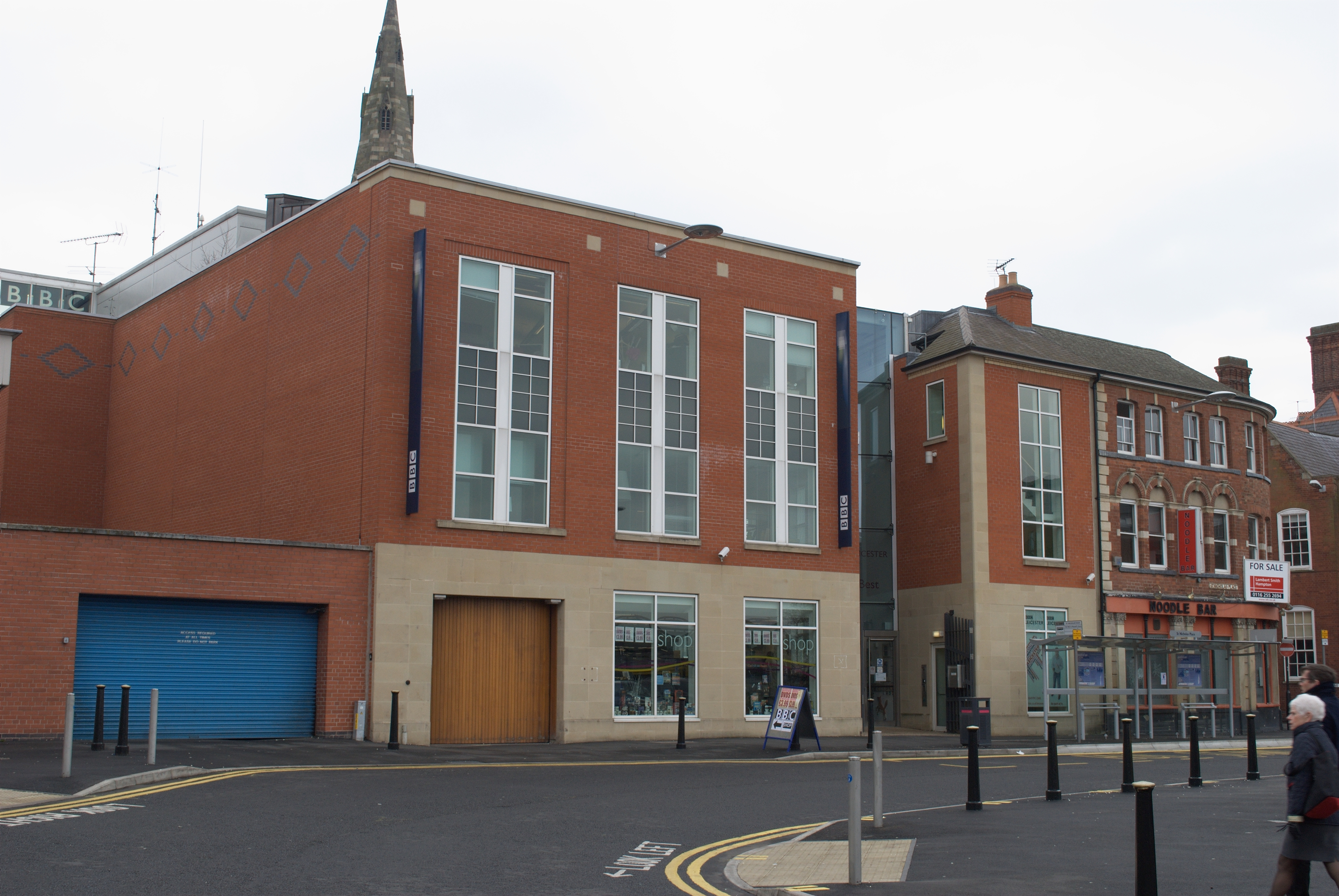
BBC Leicester building at 9 St Nicholas Place.

== Studios ==
In 2005, the station moved to new premises at 9 St Nicholas Place. This new centre is adjacent to the medieval Guildhall and Cathedral and includes many aspects of Leicester's history, such as Victorian tiles and an undercroft (first revealed in 1841), with remains dating to Roman times. The Centre formerly housed the BBC College of Journalism's base for the Midlands, an IT Centre which was used in partnership with local organisations, and a BBC Shop that sold a wide range of BBC-branded merchandise.

== Technical ==
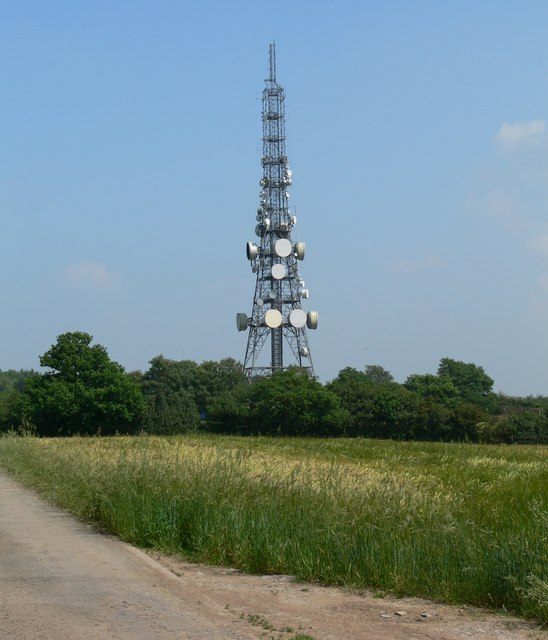
Copt Oak transmitter next to the M1 motorway.

Although the station's FM transmitter mast is only 70 m (230 ft) tall, it is set 235 m (770 ft) above sea level on top of the Jurassic limestone ridge at Copt Oak, next to the M1. This is a high point in Charnwood Forest, part of the National Forest.

Since 6 December 2002, the station's DAB signal has come from the NOW Digital East Midlands (NDEM) Leicester 11B multiplex, which comes from the Copt Oak, Leicester Cardinal, Waltham, and Houghton on the Hill transmitters.

The station also broadcasts on Freeview TV channel 713 in the BBC East Midlands region and streams online via BBC Sounds.

The station also used to broadcast on 837 kHz medium wave frequency from the Freeman's Common transmitter, near the University of Leicester. On 30 October 1989, the BBC Asian Network launched on the 837 MW frequency, as well as launching on the MW frequency of BBC WM. Initially launched as a part-time service across the Midlands, it became a full-time service in 1996, resulting in BBC Radio Leicester no longer broadcasting on medium wave.

== Programming ==
Local programming is produced and broadcast from the BBC's Leicester studios from 06:00 to 14:00 on Mondays to Fridays.

All other programming apart from sport became regional or national in 2023 although the 14:00–18:00 weekday regional show is broadcast from the Radio Leicester studios.

During the station's downtime, BBC Radio Leicester simulcasts overnight programming from BBC Radio 5 Live.

== Presenters ==
=== Notable past presenters ===
- Herdle White
- Bill Buckley
- Bill Maynard
