= Canada–Philippines waste dispute =

2010s diplomatic row

Manila and Vancouver on opposite sides of the Pacific

The Canada–Philippines waste dispute was an international row over allegedly-mislabeled Canadian garbage shipped to Manila by a recycling company. The 103 shipping containers that left from Vancouver in 2013–14 were labeled as recyclable plastics; the Philippines said they instead contained household waste.

The intricacies of international treaties, the private company involved, and Canadian regulations complicated the situation through 2019 when Philippine President Rodrigo Duterte began threatening Canada with ultimata. On May 30, 2019, 69 containers of Canadian trash were shipped back.

== Garbage ==
In 2013 and 2014, 103 shipping containers were transported from Vancouver to Manila by Chronic Plastics Inc.

Though declared to contain recyclable plastic, the Filipino Bureau of Customs claimed to have instead found "household trash, plastic bottles and bags, newspapers, and used adult diapers". The Philippine Department of Environment and Natural Resources said that a "significant" of the contents was unrecyclable, but that it was non-toxic, with its director confirming that "It's a blue bin waste. [sic] That's paper, dry plastic generated from the kitchen. I have not seen any syringe, any diaper. It's not hazardous, but it's waste still".

Chronic Plastics was accused of violating the Basel Convention (on the Control of Transboundary Movements of Hazardous Wastes and Their Disposal), to which the Philippines and Canada are both signatories. While the treaty stipulates that "the exporting country must take back the waste materials if the receiving country refuses to accept them", Canada refused on the grounds that the garbage was municipal solid waste, not hazardous waste. Before their 2019 repatriation, Vancouver's director of solid waste operations told the Toronto Star that 95 percent of the bins' contents was paper and plastic, and only one percent was stray garbage.

By November 2017, at least 26 of the containers' trash had been buried at a landfill in Capas, Tarlac.

== Repatriation ==
In 2016, a Philippine court ruled that the garbage should return to Canada. That same year, Canadian environmental laws were changed to require companies such as Chronic Plastics to retrieve their trash. At the 2017 summit for the Association of Southeast Asian Nations, Canadian Prime Minister Justin Trudeau explained that Canadian laws and regulations had prohibited his nation from accepting the garbage, but that workarounds were in place, though the two nations had not yet settled on financial responsibilities. As of November 13, 2018, storing the Canadian waste had cost approximately 36 million Philippine pesos (683,612 United States dollars).

In an analysis of the situation in January 2019, Antonio La Viña said that there was nothing for the Philippines to do but wait on Canadian retrieval of the trash. About three months later, in the wake of the 2019 Luzon earthquake, Philippine President Rodrigo Duterte lashed out at Canada over the garbage remaining in Manila. After accusing Canada of denigrating Filipinos, Duterte proclaimed that if the trash was not removed by Canada within a week (by April 30, 2019), the Philippines would declare war on Canada. In response to Duterte's threat, the Canadian ambassador to the Philippines said, "I won't comment on the specific words of the president or his tone, but I will say this: Our prime minister committed and has recommitted to resolving this issue, including taking the waste back to Canada."

A week after his deadline was missed, Duterte set a new one of May 15, with his secretary of foreign affairs—Teodoro Locsin Jr.—saying, "The President expects the garbage to be seaborne by May 15. That expectation will be met or else…" That same day, Global Affairs Canada announced that they had made an offer to retrieve the garbage and were working closely with the government of the Philippines to work out the details. Bolloré Logistics Canada was awarded the Canadian government's contract to ship the waste out of the Philippines.

At the Subic Special Economic and Freeport Zone on May 30, 2019, 69 shipping containers of Canadian trash were loaded onto the cargo ship M/V Bavaria for transport to Canada at a cost of US$840,000 (equivalent to about $1.06M in 2025) or CA$1.17 million (equivalent to about CA$1.41M in 2025).

After being transferred to Anna Maersk while in Taiwan, the trash was still on schedule to reach Canada by the end of June 2019, after which—according to Environment and Climate Change Canada—it would end up at a Vancouver waste-to-energy plant.

On June 4, with the refuse matter considered settled, Philippine Executive Secretary Salvador Medialdea lifted Duterte's five-day-long bans on traveling to Canada and doing business with Canadian officials. By June 6 though, the Philippine ambassador to Canada had not yet returned. Finally, on June 29, 2019, 69 containers of Chronic Plastics' wayward trash arrived at the Roberts Bank Superport in Delta, British Columbia.

== Aftermath ==
Jim Makris was the owner of Chronic Inc. In 2020, he began petitioning the government of Canada to release evidence he said would exonerate him and his company from any wrongdoing, as well as apologize for damage done to his reputation.
