= List of Carleton University people =

This is a list of notable people associated with Carleton University, such as faculty members and alumni.

== Lineage and establishment ==
=== Chancellors ===
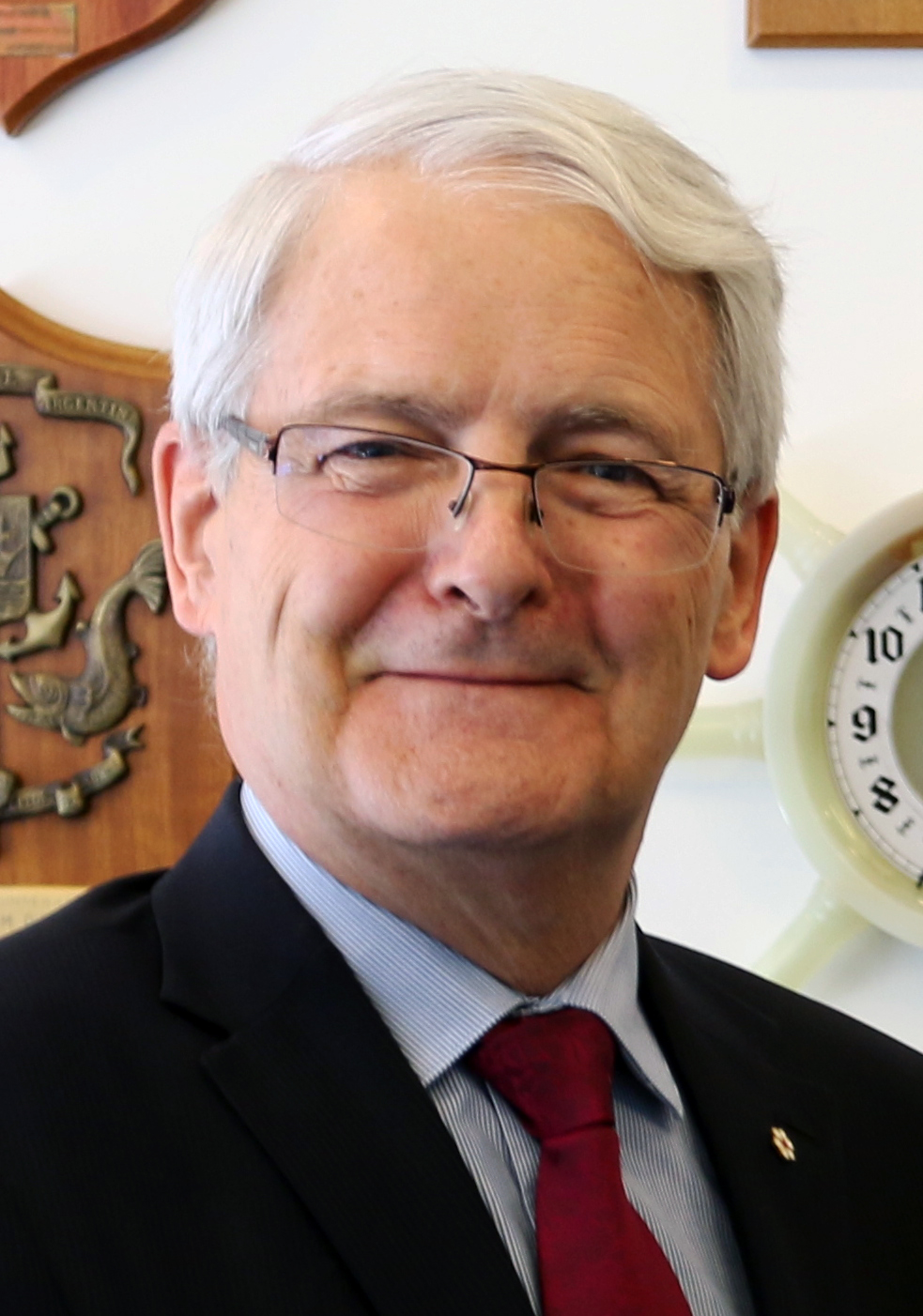
Marc Garneau

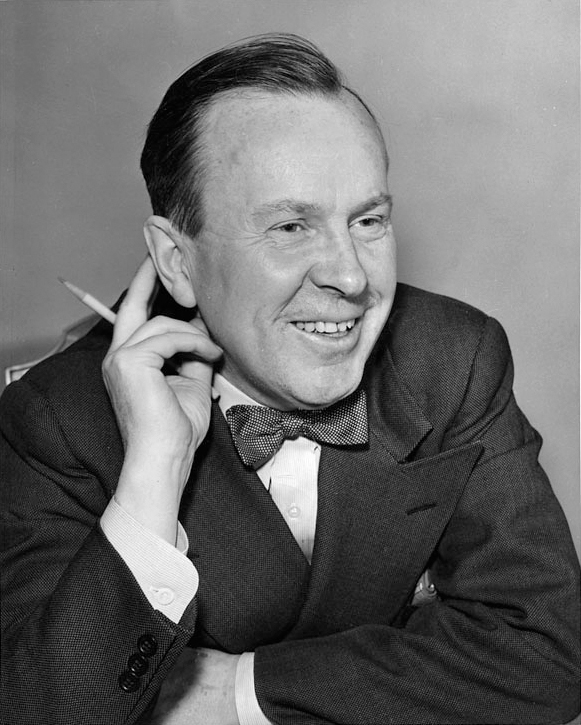
Lester B. Pearson, Chancellor, Prime Minister, Nobel Laureate

- 1952–1954 Harry Stevenson Southam
- 1954–1968 Jack Mackenzie
- 1969–1972 Lester B. Pearson
- 1973–1980 Gerhard Herzberg
- 1980–1990 Robert Gordon Robertson (Emeritus 1992–2013)
- 1990–1992 Pauline Jewett
- 1993–2002 Arthur Kroeger (Emeritus 2002–2008)
- 2002 Ray Hnatyshyn
- 2003–2008 Marc Garneau
- 2008–2011 Herb Gray
- 2011–2017 Charles Chi
- 2018–2025 Yaprak Baltacioğlu
- 2025–present Nik Nanos

=== Presidents ===
- 1942–1947 Henry Marshall Tory
- 1947–1955 Murdoch Maxwell MacOdrum
- 1955–1956 James Alexander Gibson (pro tempore)
- 1956–1958 Claude Bissell
- 1958–1972 Davidson Dunton
- 1972–1978 Michael Kelway Oliver
- 1979 James Downey (pro tempore) 1 January – 15 May
- 1979–1989 William Edwin Beckel
- 1989–1996 Robin Hugh Farquhar
- 1996–2005 Richard J. Van Loon
- 2005–2006 David W. Atkinson
- 2006–2008 Samy Mahmoud (pro tempore), from 20 November 2006
- 2008–2017 Roseann Runte
- 2017–2018 Alastair Summerlee (interim)
- 2018–2023 Benoit-Antoine Bacon
- 2023–2024 Jerry Tomberlin (interim)
- 2025–present Wisdom Tettey

=== Chairs of the Board of Governors ===
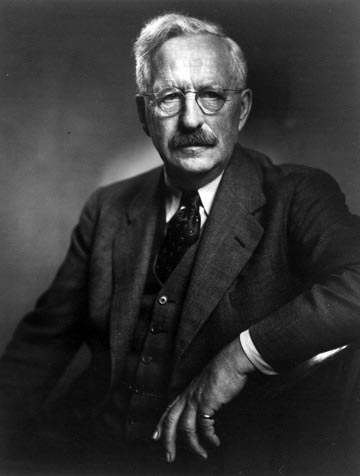
Henry Marshall Tory

- 1942–1949 Philip D. Ross, Honorary Chairman
- 1942–1947 Henry Marshall Tory
- 1947–1952 Harry Stevenson Southam
- 1952–1960 J.E. Coyne
- 1960–1962 E.W. Richard Steacie
- 1962–1965 C.C. Gibson
- 1965–1972 David A. Golden
- 1972–1974 James Lorne Gray
- 1974–1976 Russ J. Neill
- 1976–1978 Hyman Soloway
- 1978–1980 George A. Fierheller
- 1980–1982 Denis A. Ross
- 1982–1984 Clifford Thomas Kelley
- 1984–1985 Jean Teron
- 1985–1987 Claude Edwards
- 1987–1989 Ross Cruikshank
- 1990–1992 Donald Yeomans
- 1992–1993 Sam Hughes
- 1993–1995 Maureen O'Neil
- 1995–1997 Ivan Fellegi
- 1997–2000 Robert Laughton
- 2000–2002 Allen Lumsden
- 2002–2005 Jocelyn Ghent Mallett
- 2005–2006 Margaret Bloodworth
- 2006–2008 David M. Dunn
- 2008–2010 Jacques Shore
- 2010–2012 Gisele Samson-Verreault
- 2012–2014 Ronald Jackson
- 2014–2016 Anthony (Tony) Tattersfield
- 2016–2018 Christopher Carruthers
- 2018–2020 Nik Nanos
- 2020–2022 Dan Fortin
- 2022–2024 Greg Farrell
- 2024–present Beth Creary

=== Notable alumni and faculty ===
==== Academics ====
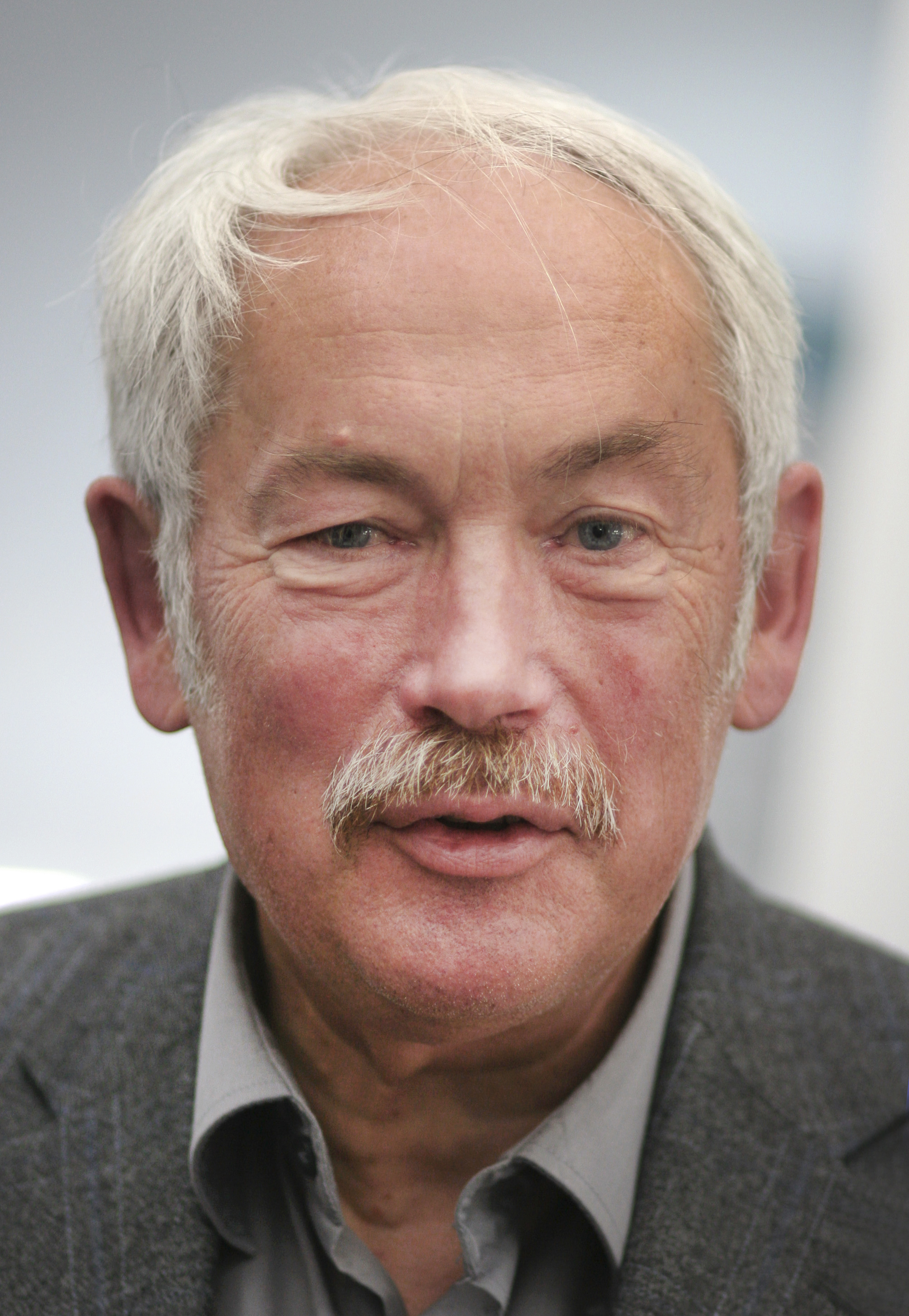
Peter Grünberg

- Emma Anderson, professor at University of Ottawa
- Aslam Anis, professor of health economics at the UBC Faculty of Medicine
- Andrew Brook, Chancellor's Professor of Philosophy and Cognitive Science
- Madhu Dikshit, cardiovascular biologist and N-Bios laureate
- Ivan Fellegi, former Chief Statistician of Canada
- Peter Grünberg, Nobel laureate in Physics 2007
- Erin Johnson, professor of theoretical chemistry at Dalhousie University
- Lawrence M. Krauss, physics professor at Arizona State University and popular science author
- Michael I. Krauss, professor at George Mason University School of Law
- Randal Marlin, Carleton philosophy professor specializing in the study of propaganda
- Robin Neill, economic historian
- Ryan North, writer and computer scientist
- Norm O'Reilly, professor at University of Guelph
- John Porter, former professor of sociology
- Edwin G. Pulleyblank, professor at the University of British Columbia
- Kenneth B. Storey, current professor of biology
- William Sweet, professor of philosophy, Fellow of the Royal Society of Canada

==== Entertainers ====
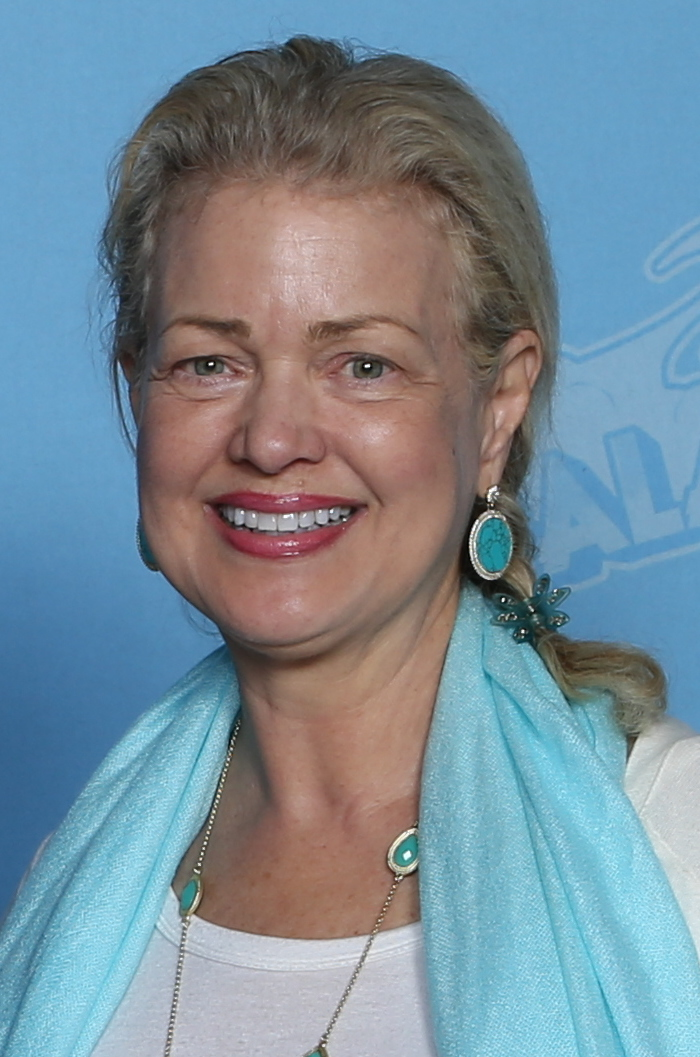
Melody Anderson

- Emily Yeung, host of This is Emily Yeung
- Melody Anderson, retired actress, social worker
- Jeremy Gara, band drummer of Arcade Fire
- Elizabeth Hanna, undergraduate major in philosophy and later graduate of the National Theatre School of Canada; voice actor and speech-language pathologist
- Hamza Haq, actor
- Mervyn G.H. Hinds, Chicago blues musician, known as Harmonica Hinds
- jev., rapper
- K-OS (Kheaven Brereton), musician
- Kayhan Kalhor, Grammy award-winning musician
- Norm Macdonald, comedian, actor
- Mia Martina, pop singer, bestselling author

==== Entrepreneurs ====
- Suhayya Abu-Hakima, co-founder and CEO of AmikaNow! and Amika Mobile Corporation
- David Azrieli, architect, 10th richest man in Canada
- Conrad Black, former businessman
- Trevor Matthews, founder and CEO of Brookstreet Pictures
- Jamie Salter, founder and CEO of Authentic Brands Group
- Eric Sprott, founder of Sprott Asset Management
- Shane Smith, co-founder and CEO of Vice

==== Journalists ====
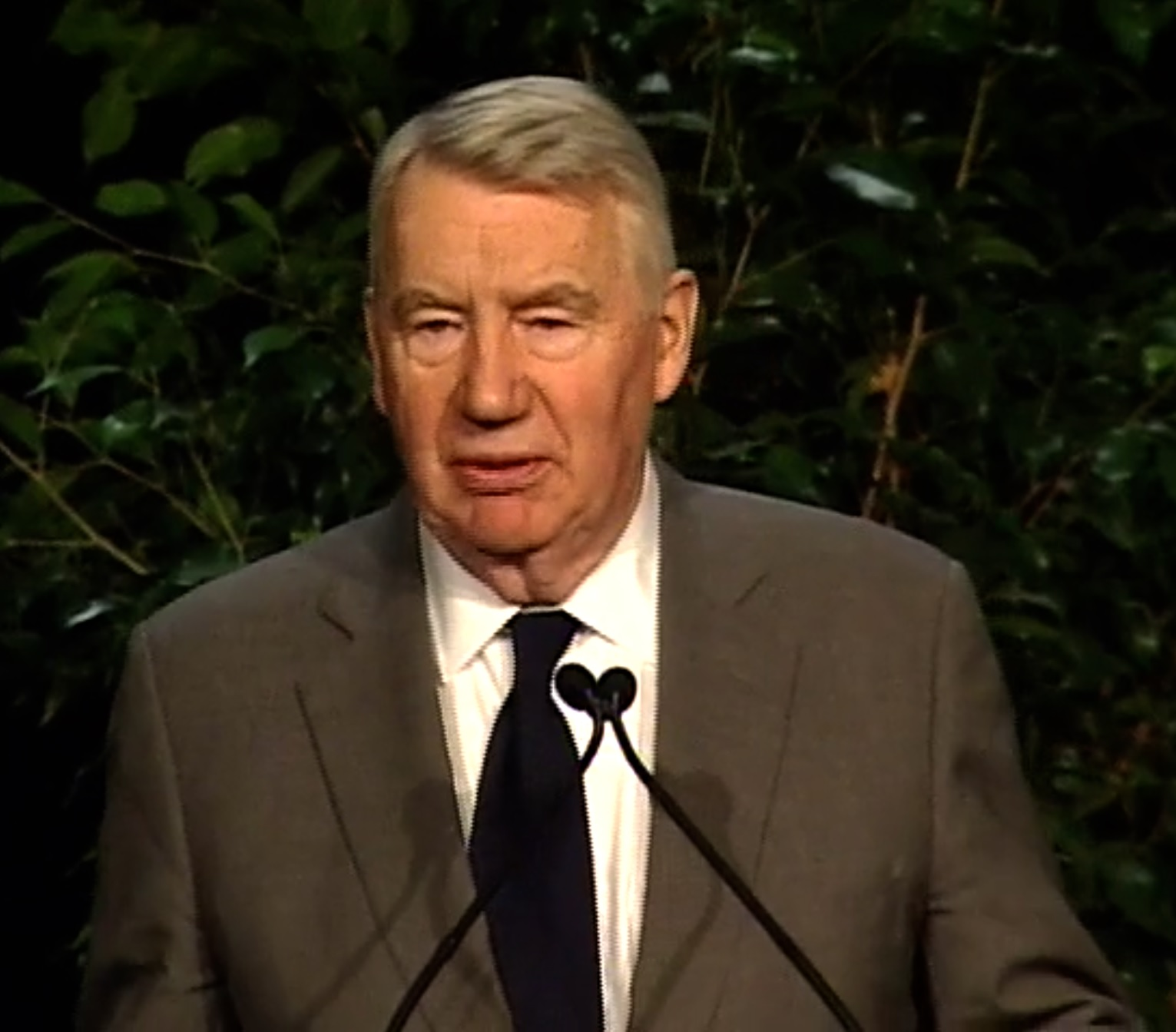
Robert MacNeil

- Nahlah Ayed, former Middle East correspondent and host of Ideas on CBC Radio One
- Rosemary Barton, political journalist and host of Power & Politics on CBC News Network
- Keith Boag, chief political correspondent for CBC News
- Mark Bourrie, lawyer, journalist, author of RBC Taylor Prize for literary non-fiction for Bush Runner: The Adventures of Pierre-Esprit Radisson
- Rita Celli, host for Canadian Broadcasting Corporation
- Andrew Chang, television journalist
- Petronila Cleto, Filipino journalist, film critic and social activist
- James Duthie, TSN host and journalist
- Matthew Fraser, former editor-in-chief of National Post
- Edward Greenspon, former editor-in-chief of The Globe and Mail
- Greg Ip, economic journalist, The Wall Street Journal
- Peter Jennings, journalist and news anchor for ABC News, two-time Peabody Award winner, awarded a Litterarum doctor, honoris causa in 1997
- Arthur Kent, Emmy award-winning war correspondent
- Carolyn Mackenzie, broadcaster
- Robert MacNeil, journalist, Officer of the Order of Canada
- Sheila MacVicar, Emmy- and Peabody Award-winning journalist
- Gavin McInnes, writer, founder of Vice
- Saša Petricic, journalist, photographer, currently senior correspondent for CBC's The National
- Paul Watson, Pulitzer Prize-winning photojournalist

==== Politicians ====
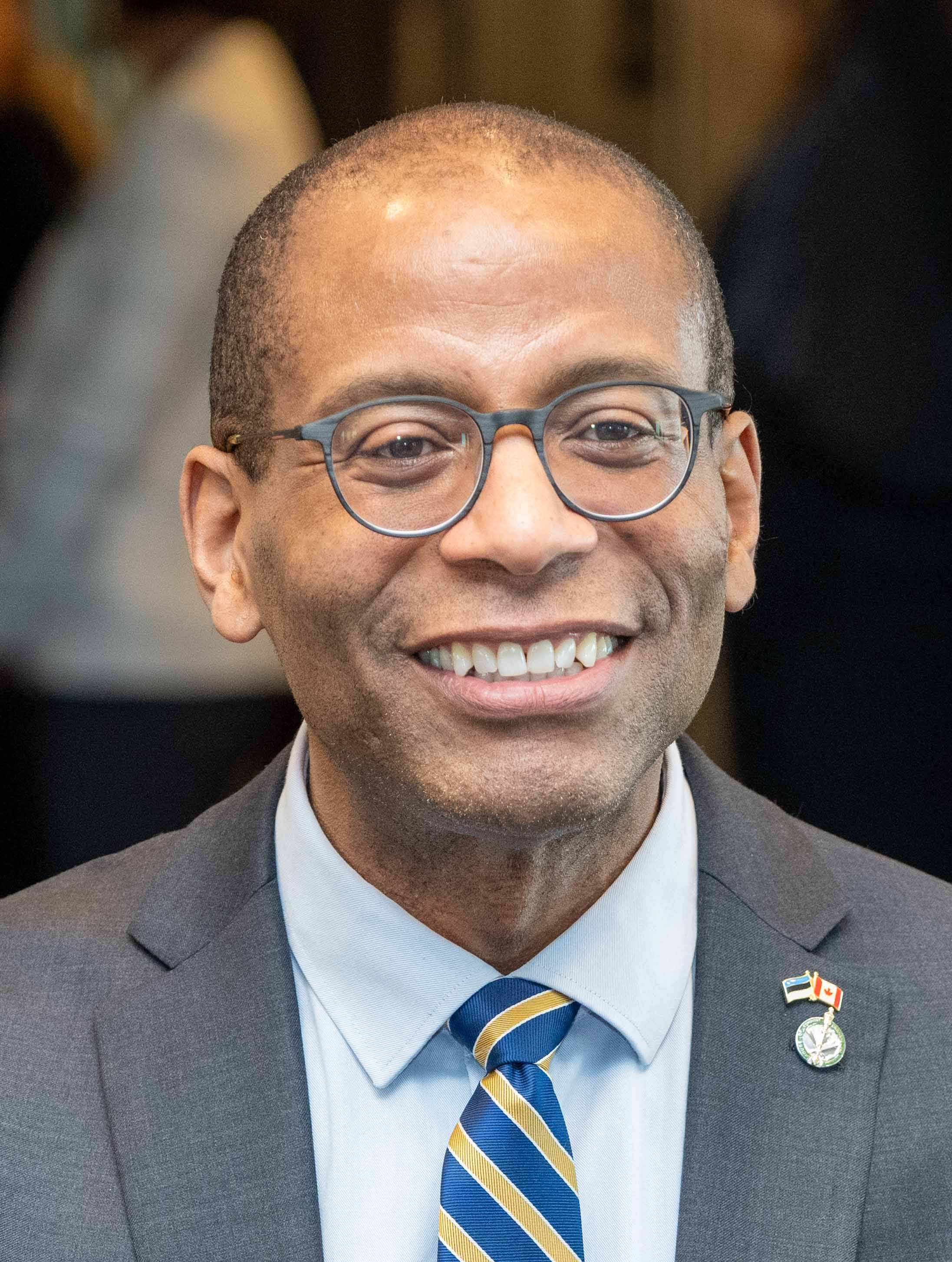
Greg Fergus

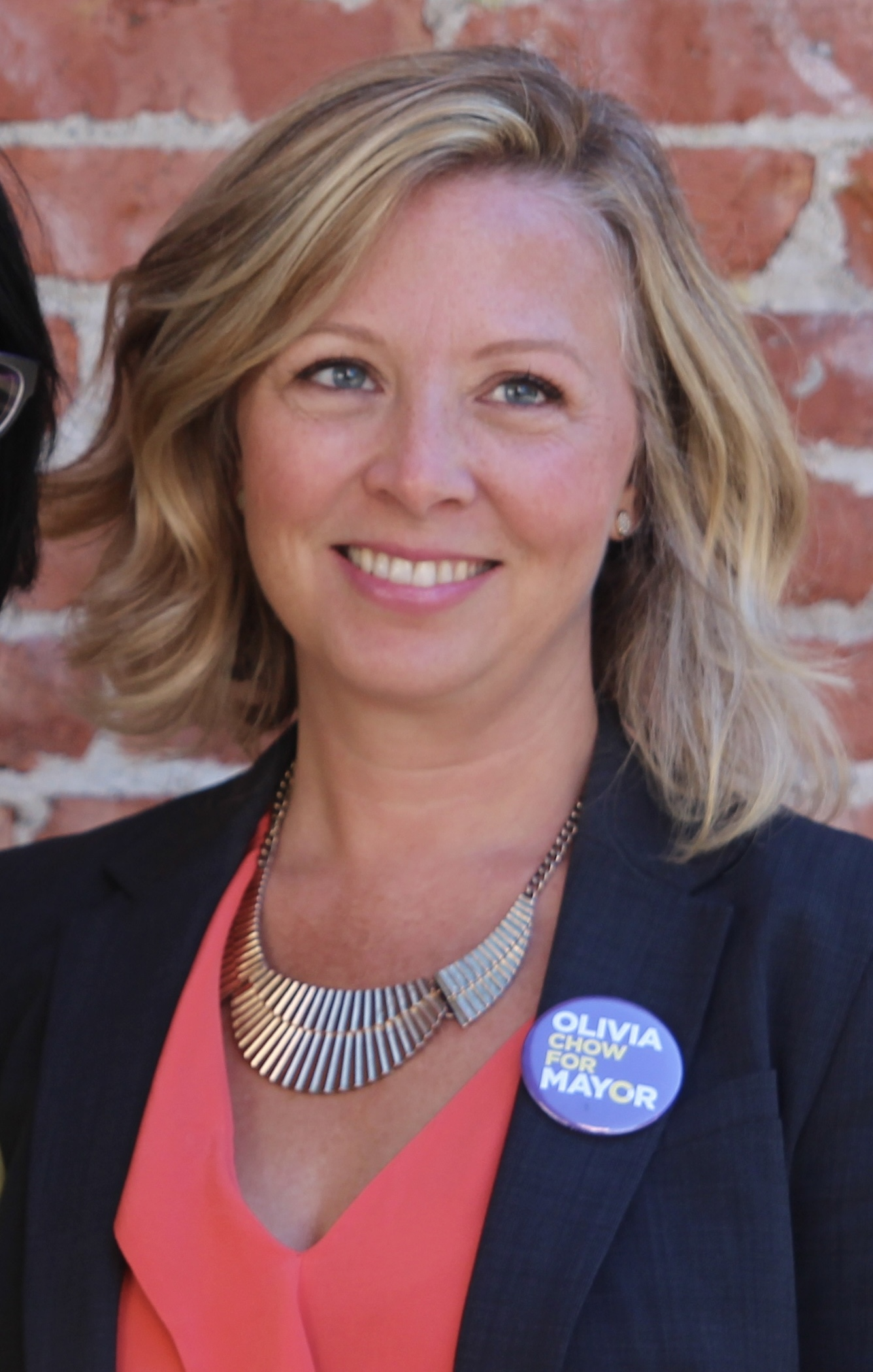
Marit Stiles

- Gary Anandasangaree, Minister of Justice and Attorney General of Canada
- Arielle Kayabaga, Leader of the Government in the House of Commons of Canada
- Niki Ashton, Member of Parliament, New Democratic Party leadership candidate
- Lindsay Blackett, first black Cabinet minister in Alberta
- Patrick Boyer, Member of Parliament
- Gord Brown, Member of Parliament
- Ben Carr, Member of Parliament
- Mike Colle, Member of Provincial Parliament
- Alex Cullen, Member of Provincial Parliament, Ottawa City Councillor
- Hans Daigeler, Member of Provincial Parliament
- Barry Devolin, former Member of Parliament
- Paul Dewar, former Member of Parliament
- Ward P.D. Elcock, Deputy Minister of Defence, former Director of Canadian Security Intelligence Service
- Greg Fergus, Speaker of the House of Commons of Canada
- Catherine Fife, Member of Provincial Parliament, President of the Ontario Public School Boards Association
- Rob Ford, former mayor of the City of Toronto, studied political science for a year
- Larisa Galadza, Canadian Ambassador to Ukraine
- Evelyn Gigantes, Member of Provincial Parliament
- Jacqueline Creft, Minister of Women's Affairs of the People's Revolutionary Government of Grenada
- Abdul Momin Ismail, former Chief Minister of Brunei and member of the Legislative Council
- Pauline Jewett, Member of Parliament, professor and Chancellor of Carleton University
- Leo Jordan, Member of Provincial Parliament
- Wilbert Keon, Senator, heart surgeon
- Catherine Kitts, Ottawa City Councillor
- Branden Leslie, Member of Parliament
- John Manley, former Deputy Prime Minister and Finance Minister of Canada
- Marco Mendicino, Member of Parliament, former Minister of Public Safety
- John Milloy Member of Provincial Parliament, Minister
- Claudia Mo, Member of Hong Kong Legislative Council
- Yasir Naqvi, Member of Parliament, former Member of Provincial Parliament
- John Nater, Member of Parliament
- Tom Nevakshonoff, Member of the Legislative Assembly of Manitoba
- Paul Okalik, former premier of Nunavut
- Ernie Parsons, Member of Provincial Parliament
- Lester B. Pearson, former chancellor, professor, Prime Minister of Canada, Nobel Peace Prize laureate
- Michael Prue, Member of Provincial Parliament
- Scott Reid, Member of Parliament
- Omar Abdirashid Ali Sharmarke, former Prime Minister of Somalia
- Norm Sterling, Member of Provincial Parliament
- Marit Stiles (born 1969), Member of Provincial Parliament
- Jenna Sudds, Member of Parliament, Minister of Families, Children, and Social Development
- Barbara Sullivan, Member of Provincial Parliament
- Judy Wasylycia-Leis, former Member of Parliament
- Jim Watson, Member of Provincial Parliament, Mayor and City Councillor of Ottawa
- Omar Zakhilwal, former Professor of Economics, Afghan Finance Minister and chief economic advisor to the president of Afghanistan

==== Sportspeople ====
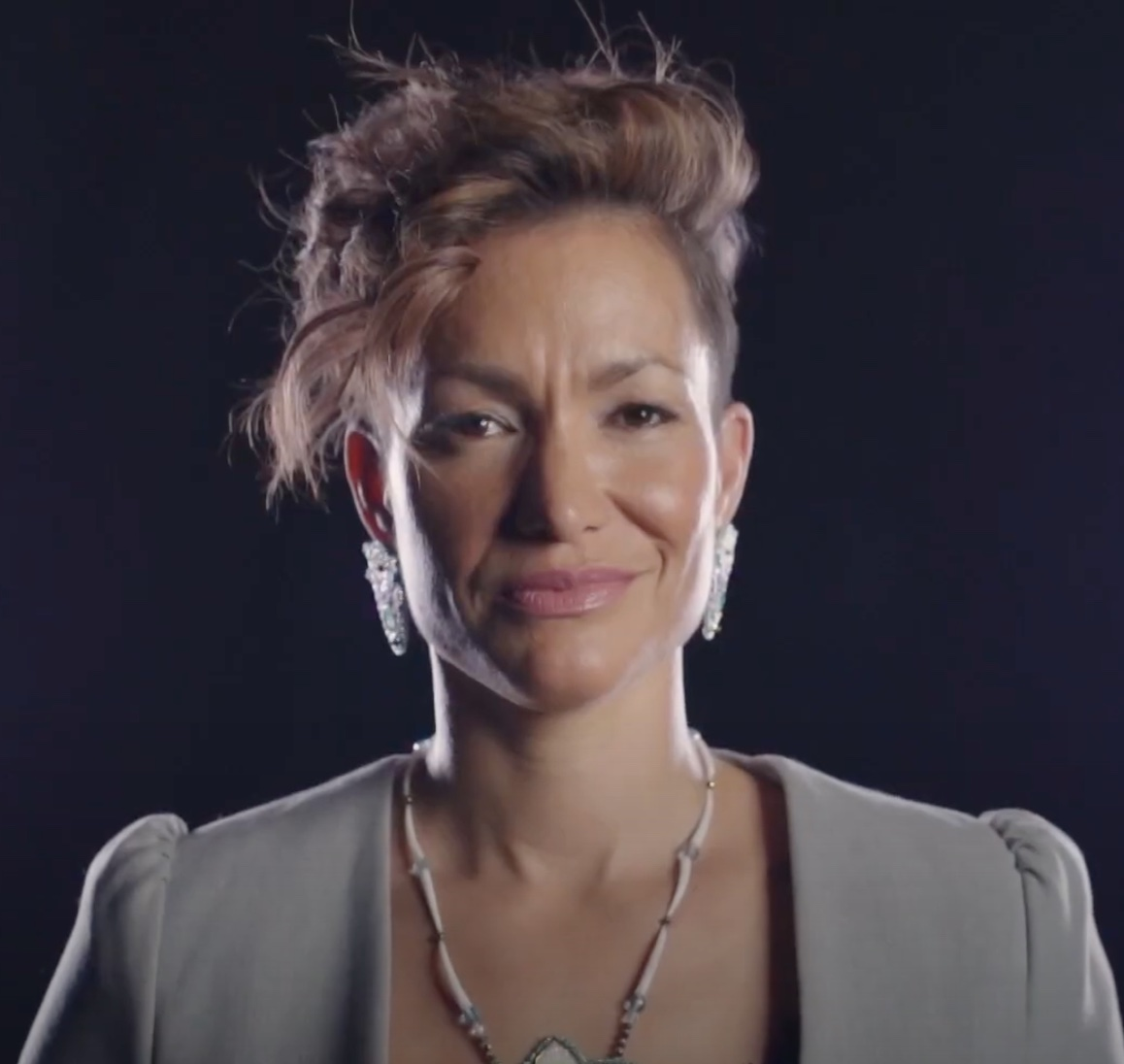
Waneek Horn-Miller

- Derek Holmes, IIHF Hall of Fame inductee
- Waneek Horn-Miller, Olympian and activist
- Linda Thom, Olympic gold medal-winning shooter
- Brian Wilks (born 1966), NHL hockey player

==== Writers ====
- Chris Bailey, writer and productivity consultant
- Shirley Barrie, playwright
- Daniel Francis, writer and historian
- Sara Gruen, fiction author known best for award-winning novel Water for Elephants
- J.J. McAvoy, writer
- Peter Worthington, editor-in-chief of the Toronto Sun

==== Others ====
- Ngaire Blankenberg, former director of the National Museum of African Art
- Louise Charron, Puisne Justice of the Supreme Court of Canada
- Dan Conlin, historian, author, former journalist at CBC Ottawa, currently curator of the Maritime Museum of the Atlantic
- Tong Daochi, former secretary of the Chinese Communist Party of Sanya Committee
- Lorna deBlicquy, pioneering woman aviator
- Michelle Douglas, human rights activist
- Lorne Elias, inventor of the explosives vapour detector EVD-1
- Allan Gregg, pollster, political pundit
- Gregory Henriquez, architect, Governor-General's Medal for Architecture
- Abdul Rahman Jabarah, alleged al-Qaeda member killed in 2003
- Jim Judd, director of the Canadian Security Intelligence Service
- Kenneth Chan Kai-tai, Hong Kong actor and television host for Cable TV Hong Kong channel
- Warren Kinsella, lawyer, author, musician, political consultant, lobbyist and commentator
- Chalmers Jack Mackenzie, former chancellor, first president of Atomic Energy of Canada Limited
- Amy Miller, filmmaker
- Michelle Mohabeer, filmmaker
- Howard Nuk, industrial designer (former VP of Design at Samsung and Co-founder at Palm)
- Kathryn Otley, Anglican bishop of Ottawa
- Michele Pollesel, Anglican bishop of Uruguay
- Karim Rashid, industrial designer
- Cristine Rotenberg, crime statistics analyst and nail art YouTube personality
- Wayne Smith, Chief Statistician of Statistics Canada
- Katie Tallo, filmmaker and writer
- Susan Wood, Canadian literature scholar, pioneer of feminist science fiction studies
- James K. Wright, composer, pianist, and musicologist
- Janice Charette, Canadian public servant

=== Notable honorary degree recipients ===
- Daniel Alfredsson, former Ottawa Senators captain
- Kofi Annan, United Nations Secretary-General (1997–2007), Nobel Peace Prize laureate; awarded a Legum Doctor, honoris causa in 2004
- Wanda Thomas Bernard, Canadian Senator; awarded Legum Doctor, honoris causa in 2021
- Boutros Boutros-Ghali, United Nations Secretary-General (1992–1997); awarded a Legum Doctor, honoris causa in 1995
- Helen Clark, 37th Prime Minister of New Zealand (1999–2008) and Administrator of the United Nations Development Programme (2009–2017); awarded Legum Doctor, honoris causa in 2012
- Tommy Douglas, 7th Premier of Saskatchewan; led the first socialist government in North America and introduced universal public health care to Canada; awarded a Legum Doctor, honoris causa in 1980
- Mikhail Gorbachev, General Secretary of the Communist Party of the Soviet Union; awarded a Legum Doctor, honoris causa in 1993
- Dag Hammarskjöld, United Nations Secretary-General (1953–1961), Nobel Peace Prize laureate; awarded a Legum Doctor, honoris causa in 1954
- Tomson Highway, Indigenous playwright and novelist; awarded Doctor of Fine Arts, honoris causa in 2013
- Michaëlle Jean, Governor General of Canada (2005–2010); awarded a Legum Doctor, honoris causa in 2012
- David Johnston, Governor General of Canada (2010–2017); awarded a Legum Doctor, honoris causa in 2016
- Peter Mansbridge, Canadian Broadcaster; awarded a Legum Doctor, honoris causa in 2014
- Paul Martin, 21st Prime Minister of Canada (2003–2006); awarded Legum Doctor, honoris causa in 2019
- Sheilah L. Martin, Canadian Judge, awarded Legum Doctor, honoris causa in 2021
- Javier Pérez de Cuéllar, United Nations Secretary-General (1982–1992); awarded a Legum Doctor, honoris causa in 1985
- André Picard, Canadian journalist; awarded Legum Doctor, honoris causa in 2017
- Romano Prodi, 79th Prime Minister of Italy; awarded a Legum Doctor, honoris causa in 2001
- Murray Sinclair, Chairman of the Indian Residential Schools Truth and Reconciliation Commission (2009–2015), awarded a Legum Doctor, honoris causa in 2015
- U Thant, United Nations Secretary-General (1961–1971); awarded a Legum Doctor, honoris causa in 1962
- Buffy Ste-Marie, Indigenous musician; awarded Legum Doctor, honoris causa in 2008
- Robert Thirsk, Canadian astronaut and engineer; awarded D.Eng., honoris causa in 2019
- Herman Van Rompuy, 49th Prime Minister of Belgium (2008–2009) and then as the first permanent President of the European Council (2009–2014); awarded a Legum Doctor, honoris causa in 2017
- Kurt Waldheim, United Nations Secretary-General (1972–1981); awarded a Legum Doctor, honoris causa in 1972
- Muhammad Yunus, Bangladeshi social entrepreneur, banker, economist and civil society leader; awarded a Legum Doctor, honoris causa in 2010

== Other people ==
Name	Known for	Relationship to Carleton
Timothy J. Anderson	Opera singer, writer	Graduate
Dan Aykroyd	Actor	Studied at Carleton, honorary D.Litt. 1994
David Azrieli	Architect, businessman	Graduate
Rosemary Barton	Political journalist, host of Power & Politics on CBC News Network	Graduate
Georges Bédard	Ottawa City Councillor	Graduate
Conrad Black	Financier and newspaper magnate	Graduate
Walter Douglas Boyd	Heart surgeon	Graduate
Patrick Boyer	Member of Parliament	Graduate
George Brizan	Former Prime Minister of Grenada	Graduate
Gord Brown	Politician	Graduate
Shona Brown	Google's VP, Business Operations	Graduate
Cody Ceci	NHL player for Edmonton Oilers	Graduate
Rita Celli	Ottawa anchor for CBC TV's Canada Now program	Graduate
Louise Charron	Justice of the Supreme Court of Canada	Graduate
Mike Colle	Politician	Graduate
Michael Cowpland	Former CEO and founder of Corel	Graduate
Alex Cullen	Ottawa City Councillor	Graduate
Allan Cutler	Public servant, politician	Graduate
Hans Daigeler	Politician	Graduate
Barry Devolin	Conservative Member of Parliament	Graduate
Paul Dewar	New Democratic Party Member of Parliament	Graduate
Michelle Douglas	Human rights activist	Graduate
James Duthie	TSN sportscaster	Graduate
Ward P.D. Elcock	Public servant	Graduate
Phil Eyler	Politician	Graduate
Ivan Fellegi	Chief Statistician of Canada	Graduate
Marc Garneau	Former President of the Canadian Space Agency, Member of Parliament	Former chancellor
Evelyn Gigantes	Former New Democrat Ontario cabinet minister	Graduate
Frank Graves	President of EKOS Research Associates	Graduate
Herb Gray	Former Deputy Prime Minister of Canada	Former chancellor
Edward Greenspon	Editor-in-chief of The Globe and Mail	Graduate
Peter Grünberg	Nobel laureate in Physics, 2007	Research faculty
Thomas Homer-Dixon	Author of The Ingenuity Gap; director of Trudeau Centre for Peace and Conflict Studies	Graduate
Peter Hume	Ottawa City Councillor	Graduate
Peter L. Hurd	Evolutionary biologist	Graduate
Marianne Illing	Member of Canadian Olympic water polo team	Graduate
Peter Jennings	Journalist	Studied briefly at Carleton, honorary D.Litt. 1997
Pauline Jewett	Politician	Taught at Carleton; was chancellor 1990–1992
Leo Jordan	Politician	Graduate
Wilbert Keon	Senator, heart surgeon	Graduate
Warren Kinsella	Politician, author, weblogger	Graduate
Alison Korn	Olympic medalist	Graduate
Lawrence M. Krauss	Author of The Physics of Star Trek	Graduate
Arthur Kroeger	Civil servant	Chancellor (1993–2002)
Shawn Little	Ottawa City Councillor	Graduate
Robert MacNeil	Journalist and television news anchor	Graduate
Maestro (Wes Williams)	Musician	Studied at Carleton
John Manley	Politician, former Deputy Prime Minister	Graduate
Randal Marlin	Author	Professor
Trevor Matthews	Producer, actor	Studied at Carleton
Gerald McMaster	Author, artist, and curator	Graduate
John Milloy	Politician	Graduate
Emma Miskew	Olympic curler	Graduate
Tom Nevakshonoff	New Democrat Manitoba MLA	Graduate
Ryan North	Comic author	Graduate
Paul Okalik	Former Premier of Nunavut	Graduate
Ernie Parsons	Politician	Graduate
Michael D. Prue	Politician	Graduate
W. Wesley Pue	Professor of law, past President of Canadian Law and Society Association	Faculty
Karim Rashid	Industrial designer	Graduate
Scott Reid	Politician	Graduate
Cristina Rémond	Model, anthropologist	Graduate
Cristine Rotenberg	Crime statistics analyst, YouTube personality	Graduate
Don Scott	Politician	Graduate
Sheridan Scott	Politician	Professor
Norm Sterling	Politician	Graduate
Barbara Sullivan	Politician	Graduate
Doug Thompson	Ottawa City Councillor	Graduate
Chris Tse	Spoken word poet	Graduate
John Turmel	Engineer, holder of Guinness world record for greatest number of elections lost	Graduate
Jill Vickers	Political scientist, author, candidate	Professor
Graham C. Walker	Professor of Biology, MIT	Graduate
Judy Wasylycia-Leis	Politician	Graduate
Jim Watson	Politician	Graduate
Douglas Whiteway	Journalist	Graduate
Peter Worthington	Journalist	Graduate
Hassan Diab (sociologist)	Convicted of terrorism charges by a French court in absentia and sentenced to life in prison.	Contract Instructor
