= The Ingenuity Gap =

Book by Thomas Homer-Dixon

- Author: Thomas Homer-Dixon
- Subject: Sociology
- Publisher: Knopf
- Publication date: September 2000
- Media type: Print (hardcover & paperback)
- Pages: 480
- ISBN: 978-0-375-40186-2
- OCLC: 44969346
- Dewey Decimal: 303.48/33 21
- LC Class: HM846 .H663 2000
- Website: homerdixon.com

The Ingenuity Gap is a non-fiction book by Canadian academic Thomas Homer-Dixon. It was written over the course of eight years from 1992 to 2000, and was published by Knopf. The book argues that the nature of problems faced by our society are becoming more complex and that our ability to implement solutions is not keeping pace. Homer-Dixon focuses upon complexities, unexpected non-linear results, and emergent properties. He takes an inter-disciplinary approach connecting political science with sociology, economics, history, and ecology.

After Robert D. Kaplan referenced Homer-Dixon's work in the 1994 The Atlantic Monthly article, "The Coming Anarchy", Homer-Dixon was offered a book deal. He spent the next half decade preparing until it was finally published in 2000 in North America and the United Kingdom.

While it spent three weeks at #1 on a Canadian best-seller list, it did not sell many copies in the United States. Critics were pleased with Homer-Dixon's scholarship, straightforward presentation, and the book's breadth, but some found the writing self-indulgent.

Homer-Dixon was awarded the Governor General's Award for English language non-fiction in 2001 and the book went on to be translated into French and Spanish.

== Background ==
Author Thomas Homer-Dixon was a 44-year-old academic and director at the University of Toronto's Peace and Conflict Studies program at the time of publication. While the book took eight years to write, Homer-Dixon had been developing the ideas behind it for most of his career.

As a youth, an interest in current events was fostered by his parents and led him to study causes of human violence at university. He graduated from Carleton University with a Bachelor of Arts and, in 1989, the Massachusetts Institute of Technology with a doctorate in political science. He accepted the director position at the Peace and Conflict Studies program in 1990.

Homer-Dixon and his theories were featured in an article written by Robert D. Kaplan, in the February 1994 edition of The Atlantic Monthly, entitled "The Coming Anarchy". The article made him into an emerging academic celebrity and resulted in several book deal offers. By 1997 Homer-Dixon, working out of his home office, had accumulated more than 100 kilometres (62 mi) of paper and was overwhelmed by the project, stating, "I'm living the problem I'm describing."

In 1999, Homer-Dixon and Princeton University Press published Environment, Scarcity, and Violence containing his research on resource scarcity leading to violence. For The Ingenuity Gap, he re-organized the framework along three strands, thematic, geographical, and metaphoric, and structured it like a travelogue from which he could launch examples.

== Content ==
Homer-Dixon begins by presenting his personal and academic background that led to the drafting of this book. He establishes that the nature of problems are becoming overly burdensome, including providing resources for exponentially growing populations, managing international environmental impacts, and creating a secure global economic market. Modern problems often contain numerous factors that interact to create hidden complexities and non-linear results. The 1997 Asian financial crisis is used to illustrate a system in which professed experts had confidence in but internal and external factors compounded upon each other to create a sudden, unexpected drop. The delusion of control, or the assumption that experts were in control, led to overconfidence in an economic system that was not well understood. Homer-Dixon finds that the experts are just as susceptible to groupthink as non-experts and that they have boundless capacity for hindsight rationalization of unexpected movements.

As older problems are solved, more complexities are being introduced, like adding additional parts to an engine. Interaction of these new parts, or niches, create emergent properties, like time-saving office devices (e.g. email, mobile computers, etc.) make communication more efficient but also expand the network of contacts and increase the amount of time spent on such duties. Homer-Dixon relates this to complexity theory explaining that as new niches are filled there is a synergistic burst of simplicity. However, this can also lead to less control or freedom as emergent properties are created, like a new government program leading to a sprawling bureaucracy. Information theory is touched upon relating the amount of information required to describe a system and the degree of that system's complexity. Chaos theory is used to describe how small changes can lead to widely varying results and path dependence.

Homer-Dixon explains how his theory was influenced by endogenous or new growth theory in which ideas are a factor of production independent of labour and capital. He distinguishes his stance from Neo-Malthusianism which seeks to manage systems by controlling demand and from market fundamentalism which believe free markets can provide timely solutions to any problem. Several problems in advancing basic science are identified: human cognitive limits, intrinsic complexity of field, limits of scientific institutions, and social and cultural values regarding science.

== Style ==
The Ingenuity Gap is a popular science book. Homer-Dixon takes an inter-disciplinary approach connecting political science with sociology, economics, history, biology, and ecology. The narrative is structured as a travelogue as the author travels to meet experts and construct his theory. His observations along the way illustrate the concepts he is explaining and supplement interviews and research. Collecting pieces of his theory from each of his interviews and destinations appears as a recurring metaphor. He includes anecdotes and social commentary.

== Publication and reception ==
The book was published in September 2000 as a hardcover, and Homer-Dixon shortly after began a 10-city tour across Canada with stops in Toronto, Ottawa, Kingston, Hamilton, London, Winnipeg, Calgary, Edmonton, Vancouver, and Victoria, amongst several other smaller venues. Promotional events were also held in the United States and England. It was published by Knopf in North America and by Jonathan Cape in the United Kingdom. An excerpt was published in the October issue of Report on Business Magazine. In the Canadian market, the book spent seven weeks on the Maclean's nonfiction best sellers' list, including three weeks at the #1 spot. It did not sell well in the United States. Homer-Dixon was awarded the 2001 Governor General's Award for English language non-fiction for the book. The trade paperback was released a year after the hardcover edition. It was translated into French and published in 2002 by Éditions du Boréal. A Spanish version was published by Espasa in 2003. Homer-Dixon went on to write a similar book, The Upside of Down: Catastrophe, Creativity, and the Renewal of Civilization, in which he elaborates upon the idea that societies are becoming less able to cope with problems, like global warming or population imbalances, as complexities compound each other and the readily available resources, like fossil fuels, are rapidly consumed.

The book's scholarship was very well received by critics. The research behind the book was called impressive for its breadth, and its presentation was said to be straightforward and thought-provoking. Critics called Homer-Dixon's writing clear, accessible, and engaging. In his review in the Quill & Quire, Mark Shainblum wrote "[d]espite the book's serious import and prodigious endnotes, The Ingenuity Gap is a surprisingly engaging and even exciting read. Homer-Dixon spins parables masterfully, using comprehensible examples to represent the almost incomprehensible complexity of our social system." The Library Journal highly recommended it for academic and general public libraries. Several critics were disappointed by the lack of recommendations to address the problems he raises. The reviewers for Books in Canada, The Canadian Geographer, and the National Post found Homer-Dixon's writing self-indulgent because it overly details his travels and experiences, and because of his overly authoritative tone that compliments people that agree with him and shows little consideration of differing perspectives.
