= Chris Bailey =

Chris Bailey may refer to:

- Chris Bailey (musician, born 1950) (1950–2013), Australian musician, member of the rock bands The Angels and Gang Gajang
- Chris Bailey (musician, born 1956) (1956–2022), Australian musician, co-founder and singer of rock band The Saints
- Chris Bailey (artist) (born 1965), New Zealand Māori carver and sculptor
- Chris Bailey (tennis) (born 1968), English tennis player, TV sports commentator and property consultant
- Chris Bailey (ice hockey) (born 1972), American ice hockey player
- Chris Bailey (rugby league) (born 1982), Australian rugby league footballer
- Chris Bailey (animator) (born 1962), American animator and director
- Chris Bailey (author) (born 1989), Canadian writer and productivity consultant
- Chris Bailey Jr. (born 1989), American stock car racing driver
- Christopher Bailey (runner) (born 2000), American sprinter

== See also ==
- Christopher Bailey (disambiguation)
- Chris Baillie (hurdler) (born 1981), Scottish hurdler
- Chris Baillie (politician) (born 1961/2), New Zealand politician
- Christopher Bayly (1945–2015), British historian
- Bailey (surname)
