= Christopher Bailey =

Christopher Bailey may refer to:

- Christopher Bailey (fashion designer) (born 1971), chief creative and CEO of Burberry
- Christopher Bailey (screenwriter) (born 1948), lecturer and Doctor Who screenwriter
- Christopher Bailey (runner) (born 2000), American track and field athlete

== See also ==
- Chris Bailey (disambiguation)
- Chris Baillie (disambiguation)
- Christopher Bayly (1945–2015), British historian
- Bailey (surname)
