= 2956 Yeomans =

Stony asteroid from the central regions of the asteroid belt

Discovery
- Discovered by: E. Bowell
- Discovery site: Anderson Mesa Stn.
- Discovery date: 28 April 1982

Designations
- Named after: Donald Keith Yeomans (American astronomer)
- Alternative designations: 1982 HN_{1} · 1950 JG; 1974 RN_{1} · 1977 DL_{10}
- Minor planet category: main-belt · (middle)

Orbital characteristics
- Epoch 4 September 2017 (JD 2458000.5)
- Uncertainty parameter 0
- Observation arc: 42.45 yr (15,504 days)
- Aphelion: 3.0155 AU
- Perihelion: 2.5142 AU
- Semi-major axis: 2.7648 AU
- Eccentricity: 0.0907
- Orbital period (sidereal): 4.60 yr (1,679 days)
- Mean anomaly: 229.98°
- Mean motion: 0° 12^{m} 51.84^{s} / day
- Inclination: 2.8688°
- Longitude of ascending node: 112.21°
- Argument of perihelion: 124.34°

Physical characteristics
- Dimensions: 9.350±0.183 km 11.30 km (derived)
- Synodic rotation period: 3.4±0.1 h 3.509±0.0158 h
- Geometric albedo: 0.20 (assumed); 0.292±0.014
- Spectral type: SMASS = Sr · S
- Absolute magnitude (H): 12.1 · 12.3 · 12.39±0.07 · 12.878±0.003 (S)

2956 Yeomans, provisional designation 1982 HN_{1}, is a stony asteroid from the central regions of the asteroid belt, approximately 10 kilometers in diameter. It was discovered on 28 April 1982, by astronomer Edward Bowell at the Anderson Mesa Station of the Lowell Observatory in near Flagstaff, Arizona. It was named after American astronomer Donald Keith Yeomans.

== Orbit and classification ==
Yeomans is a non-family asteroid from the asteroid belt's background population. It orbits the Sun in the central main-belt at a distance of 2.5–3.0 AU once every 4 years and 7 months (1,679 days). Its orbit has an eccentricity of 0.09 and an inclination of 3° with respect to the ecliptic.

The asteroid was first identified as 1950 JG at the Johannesburg Observatory in May 1950. The body's observation arc begins with its identification as 1974 RN_{1} at Crimea–Nauchnij in September 1974, almost 8 years prior to its official discovery observation at Anderson Mesa.

== Physical characteristics ==
In the SMASS classification, Yeomans is an Sr-subtype that transitions from the stony S-types to the uncommon R-type asteroids.

=== Rotation period ===
In April 2014, a rotational lightcurve of Yeomans was obtained from photometric observations made at the Isaac Aznar Observatory in Spain. Lightcurve analysis gave a rotation period of 3.4 hours with a brightness variation of 0.28 magnitude (U=2). A similar period of 3.509 hours with an amplitude of 0.24 magnitude was found by astronomers at the Palomar Transient Factory in October 2011 (U=2).

=== Diameter and albedo ===
According to the survey carried out by the NEOWISE mission of NASA's Wide-field Infrared Survey Explorer, Yeomans measures 9.350 kilometers in diameter and its surface has an albedo of 0.292. The Collaborative Asteroid Lightcurve Link assumes a standard albedo for stony asteroids of 0.20 and derives a diameter of 11.30 kilometers based on an absolute magnitude of 12.1.

== Naming ==
This minor planet was named after American astronomer Donald Keith Yeomans, a celestial mechanician at JPL and astrometry-expert of the International Halley Watch. The official naming citation was published by the Minor Planet Center on 18 September 1986 (M.P.C. 11158).

== In popular culture ==
- In the 1995 Sliders first-season episode "Last Days", asteroid 2956 Yeomans (misspelled Yeoman in the episode) was the asteroid responsible for almost destroying the Earth by impact.
