= Evan Hill =

American journalist & academic (1919–2010)

- Evan Hill in 1979
- Born: January 20, 1919; Philadelphia, US
- Died: April 10, 2010 (aged 91); New London, New Hampshire
- Education: Boston University (MS); Stanford University (BA)
- Occupations: Journalist, college professor
- Employer: University of Connecticut

Evan Hill (January 20, 1919 – April 10, 2010) was an American journalist and professor at the University of Connecticut (UConn), where he chaired the journalism department from 1965 to 1984. A stern but beloved teacher, Hill exerted major influence on Connecticut journalism. He mentored many editors and reporters in the region and served as a director and trustee of The Day. He authored eight books and 160 magazine articles.

== Early life ==
Hill was born in Philadelphia on January 20, 1919, to Louis and Marie (Schmeltz) Hill. He had two sisters. He graduated from high school in Bellingham, Washington, where he worked in a drugstore and a cannery while reporting for the local KVOS television station in 1938 and 1939. Moving to Juneau, Alaska, he worked as a hotel janitor and Daily Alaska Empire reporter and enlisted in the Alaska National Guard in 1941.

== Military service ==
When the United States entered World War II in December 1941, Hill deployed to the Pribilof Islands, where he was assigned to watch for Japanese ships. Bored, he volunteered for combat in Europe, where he served with the 79th Infantry Division in Belgium and France from July to September 1944. Artillery fire shattered his left femur and severed his sciatic nerve in September 1944 near Lunéville. He underwent six major operations and spent four years in and out of California hospitals. He limped for the rest of his life. Hill was discharged with the rank of captain in 1947.

According to his gravestone, Hill received a Bronze Star Medal and a Purple Heart military decoration for his service in World War II.

== Journalism career ==
While recuperating, Hill sold his first magazine article, about wounded soldiers, to Liberty. He attended Stanford University on the G.I. Bill, graduating with a Bachelor of Arts degree in 1948. He moved to Newport, New Hampshire, to serve as editor for the Argus Champion, a semi-weekly newspaper, in 1948 and 1949. He earned his Master of Science degree in journalism from Boston University in 1950. That same year, he won the annual essay contest of the American Newspaper Publishers Association and a Freedoms Foundation award.

Hill stayed at Boston University teaching journalism until 1956, when he joined the journalism faculty at Ohio State University. A year later he returned to Newport, where he spent seven years as a freelance news reporter and nonfiction magazine writer. His work was published in the Saturday Evening Post, Reader's Digest, Redbook, New York Times Magazine, Saturday Review, Yankee, Coronet, and other periodicals. He was a ghostwriter for prominent pollster George Gallup (The Secrets of Long Life, 1960) and several US government officials.

== University of Connecticut ==
In 1965, University of Connecticut president Homer Babbidge drove to New Hampshire, showing up unannounced on Hill's doorstep to persuade him to lead the university's fledgling journalism department. Hill accepted the position, moved to Storrs, and chaired the department until he retired in 1984. The department grew steadily under his leadership and thereafter, going from one full-time faculty member in 1965 to ten full-timers and eight part-timers in 2016. As of 2016, UConn's was the only nationally accredited journalism program in New England.

Former students described Hill as a strict, rigorous, respected teacher. He mentored future editors and reporters for major American periodicals; other students became corporate public relations executives. Students included Robert D. Kaplan; Maureen Croteau, who succeeded Hill as department chair; and G. Claude Albert, editor of The Connecticut Mirror.

During his tenure, Hill coauthored Reporting and Writing the News (Little, Brown, 1977) with UConn colleague John Breen. He also consulted for the Boston Globe, the Providence Journal, and the US Office of Science and Technology. He served on the board of directors of The Day Publishing Company and as a trustee of the Bodenwein Foundation from 1978 to 1989.

Hill's papers are held at the UConn Library's Archives & Special Collections. Included are notes and research he compiled about the university's history, as well as his own letters, publications, unpublished manuscripts, biographies of university presidents and alumni, speeches, notebooks, photographs, annual reports, and other miscellany.

== Later life ==
Following his 1984 retirement, Hill returned to Newport. He stayed active in the community, serving on the public library's board of trustees, the school board, the budget advisory committee, and the planning board. He taught writing to local middle-schoolers in after-school programs and to adults in evening classes. He enjoyed building furniture as a hobby.

Hill continued writing for local papers and the Boston Globe and compiled a historical chronology of Newport. He was a member of the Society for the Protection of New Hampshire Forests.

Hill died from congestive heart failure at the Woodcrest Village assisted living facility in New London, New Hampshire, on April 10, 2010. He was interred at the North Newport Cemetery.

== Personal life ==
Hill met his future wife, Priscilla Fiske (1918–2001), of Natick, Massachusetts, at an Alaska dance. She was a US Coast Guard photographer. The couple married on September 21, 1946.

Priscilla Hill died in New London, NH in 2001. Evan Hill was survived by his daughter, Lucinda Hill Hogarty, son Peter Hill, and three grandchildren.

== Publications ==
- Ghostwriter for George Gallup, The Secrets of Long Life (Geis/Random House, 1960)
- Ghostwriter, A Life after Death (Simon & Schuster, 1963)
- Beanstalk: The History of Miniature Precision Bearings (Keene, NH, 1966)
- Coauthored with William F. Stekl, The Connecticut River (Wesleyan University Press, 1972)
- The Primary State: A Historical Guide to New Hampshire (Countryman Press, 1976)
- Coauthored with John Breen, Reporting and Writing the News (Little, Brown, 1977)
- A Greener Earth (Society for the Protection of New Hampshire Forests, 1977)
- Connecticut's Own University: The First Proud Century, 1881–1981 (Storrs, CT, 1981)
