= Asia's Cauldron =

2014 book by Robert D. Kaplan

Asia's Cauldron: The South China Sea and the End of a Stable Pacific
- Author: Robert D. Kaplan
- Cover artist: Will Brown
- Language: English
- Genre: Nonfiction
- Publisher: Random House
- Publication date: March 25, 2014
- Publication place: United States
- Pages: 225
- ISBN: 978-0-8129-9432-2

Asia's Cauldron: The South China Sea and the End of a Stable Pacific is a 2014 non-fiction book by Robert D. Kaplan. The full text is divided into 8 chapters. The author describes the geopolitical significance of the South China Sea and the territorial disputes that have resulted over the region.

The New York Times, The Dallas Morning News, The Association for Asian Studies, and South China Morning Post gave it positive reviews.
