= The Coming Anarchy =

1994 article by Robert Kaplan

"The Coming Anarchy" is an influential article written by journalist Robert D. Kaplan, which was first published in the February 1994 edition of The Atlantic Monthly. It is a fundamental analysis of world affairs in the post–Cold War era, widely considered comparable in scope and importance to Samuel Huntington's Clash of Civilizations and Francis Fukuyama's The End of History and the Last Man. U.S. President Bill Clinton reportedly recommended the article to White House staff. It has also been criticized for Malthusian pessimism, and for blaming the predicted afflictions on their victims while overlooking political and economic causes such as neoliberal policy.

== The article ==
While Fukuyama believed the end of the Cold War would bring an era of world peace, Kaplan argued the Cold War was the closest the world would ever get to Utopia. The coming struggles would no longer be neatly ideological, but cultural and historical. In the disorder and civil strife then besetting West Africa, Kaplan saw the first signs of broader global trends. As environmental stress worsened, bringing widespread disease and resource conflict, rural populations would migrate toward urban areas, redefining identities along cultural or tribal lines and fomenting social strife. Politics would become localized as central state power faded, with sub-national conflicts about ethnic self-defense and self-interest, not ideology, becoming commonplace. The post-modern world would be, for Kaplan, one of numerous cross-cutting identities, systems and allegiances, far from the ordered state-based system of the West in the modern era. Following Thomas Homer-Dixon, he suggests politics should recover its links to physical territory and resources, and address the causes of problems rather than their consequences.

Kaplan advocates a new kind of cartography which emphasizes the newly relevant borderlines rather than traditional political divisions. The world map should show three dimensions, in which group and other identities are atop the spatial divisions of cities, states, and nations. Maps should be constantly evolving, showing the rise and fall of many smaller groups with moving centers of power. The "last map" should be an ever-mutating representation of chaos.

=== 20 years later ===
20 years after the original publication, Robert D. Kaplan published a follow-up entitled Why So Much Anarchy? (2016), reflecting on the relevance of his thesis to current events, especially in the Arab countries. In the new article, Kaplan recognizes that some of his prophecies, such as a revival of racial violence in America, did not come to be.

However, he stands by some of his more provocative arguments, such as the belief that "Islam is a religion ideally suited for the urbanizing poor who were willing to fight". He mentions the growing popularity of Turkish President Erdogan's conservative Justice and Development Party, largely aligned with political Islam, as fulfilling his prediction about Turkish politics. He makes further analyses of nations' relative strengths, notably a robust bureaucracy, which arises from a well developed middle class. He cites the example of the arguably successful democratic transition of most former Soviet republics into stable democracies, which can be explained by their strong bureaucratic apparatus and middle class. The lack of "bourgeoise traditions", on the other hand, can be interpreted as one of the main reasons of the failure of states such as Sierra Leone. Overall, Kaplan sticks to his original narrative, forecasting growing anarchy in large portions of the world.

In 2018, he revisited the thesis again for The National Interest in an article called "The Anarchy That Came". It concludes with the statement, "My vision—then and now—of vast geopolitical disruption is not ultimately pessimistic, but merely historical."

== The book ==
External videos
- Presentation by Kaplan on The Coming Anarchy: Shattering the Dreams of the Post Cold War, March 7, 2000, C-SPAN

The article was republished as the first chapter of the book The Coming Anarchy in 2000. The book also included the controversial article Was Democracy Just A Moment?, first published in The Atlantic in December 1997, and several others by Kaplan.

== See also ==
- Cultural evolution
- Democratic peace theory
- War to end all wars
- World peace
