= Tong Daochi =

Chinese politician

- 童道驰

Communist Party Secretary of Sanya
- In office 3 November 2018 – October 2020
- Preceded by: Yan Zhaojun
- Succeeded by: Zhou Hongbo

Vice-Governor of Hubei
- In office December 2016 – November 2018
- Governor: Wang Xiaodong

Assistant Minister of Commerce
- In office April 2014 – November 2016
- Minister: Gao Hucheng

Personal details
- Born: October 1967 (age 58–59) Pingjiang County, Hunan, China
- Party: Chinese Communist Party (2004–2021; expelled)
- Education: Peking University; Renmin University of China; Carleton University; Pardee RAND Graduate School

Chinese name
- Simplified Chinese: 童道驰
- Traditional Chinese: 童道馳
Transcriptions
Standard Mandarin
- Hanyu Pinyin: Tóng Dàochí

Tong Daochi (Chinese: 童道驰; born October 1967) is a former Chinese politician who served as Chinese Communist Party Committee Secretary of Sanya between November 2018 and October 2020. He was a member of the Standing Committee of the Hainan Provincial Committee of the Chinese Communist Party. He was investigated by the Central Commission for Discipline Inspection in November 2020.

== Biography ==
Tong was born in Pingjiang County, Hunan in October 1967. After resuming the college entrance examination, he graduated from Peking University and Renmin University of China. After that, he continued his study at Carleton University in Canada as a postgraduate student. After university, he worked at RAND Corporation in Santa Monica, California, United States. In 1994 he worked at the World Bank in Washington, D.C.

Tong returned in China in late 2010 and that same year he became an official in the Planning and Development Department of China Securities Regulatory Commission. He worked there for 8 years. Then he was appointed Assistant Minister of Commerce.

In November 2016 he was transferred to central China's Hubei province and was named vice-governor in the following month. In November 2018 he was transferred again to south China's Hainan province and appointed Chinese Communist Party Committee Secretary of Sanya, replacing Yan Zhaojun.

=== Investigation ===
On November 1, 2020, he has been placed under investigation for serious violations of laws and regulations by the Central Commission for Discipline Inspection (CCDI), the Chinese Communist Party (CCP)'s internal disciplinary body, and the National Supervisory Commission, the highest anti-corruption agency of China.

On April 30, 2021, he was expelled from the CCP and removed from public office. On June 4, he was arrested for suspected bribe taking. On September 30, he was indicted on suspicion of accepting bribes.

On January 13, 2022, prosecutors accused Tong of using his different positions as a senior securities regulator and Sanya government official between 2004 and 2020 to offer business favors and promotion opportunities. In return, he accepted money and property worth over 274 million yuan ($43 million).

On June 2, he was sentenced to death for bribery and insider trading with a two-year reprieve.

Party political offices
Preceded by Yan Zhaojun (严朝君)	Communist Party Secretary of Sanya; 2018-2020	Succeeded by Zhou Hongbo
