= Donald Yeomans =

American astronomer

Donald K. Yeomans
- Yeomans in the Space Flight Operations Facility at NASA's Jet Propulsion Laboratory, 2013
- Born: Donald Keith Yeomans; Rochester, New York, U.S.
- Education: Middlebury College; University of Maryland
- Known for: Orbit computations for Halley's Comet; Management of NASA's Near-Earth Object Program Office
- Awards: NASA Exceptional Service Medal (1986); Space Act Award (1998); NASA Distinguished Service Medal (2009); Carl Sagan Medal (2013)
- Scientific career
- Fields: Astronomy
- Workplaces: Goddard Space Flight Center; Jet Propulsion Laboratory

Donald Keith Yeomans is an American astronomer specializing in the orbital dynamics of comets and asteroids. He spent his career at NASA's Jet Propulsion Laboratory (JPL) in Pasadena, California, where he managed the agency's Near-Earth Object Program Office from 1998 until his retirement in early 2015. The asteroid 2956 Yeomans is named after him.

== Career ==
Yeomans took a bachelor's degree in mathematics at Middlebury College in 1964, followed by a master's degree in 1967 and a doctorate in astronomy in 1970, both from the University of Maryland. He worked as a contractor for the Goddard Space Flight Center before moving to JPL in 1976. There he supervised the Solar System Dynamics Group from 1992, became a senior research scientist in 1994 and was appointed a JPL Fellow in 2010.

His orbit computations for Halley's Comet indicated where observers should look for the comet on its return, and it was recovered at Palomar Observatory on 16 October 1982. He subsequently supplied the predictions used for the flybys of Halley by five spacecraft in March 1986, and his calculations also allowed observations of the comet made by Babylonian astronomers in 164 BC to be identified on clay tablets held in the British Museum. Yeomans provided the positions for the asteroids 951 Gaspra and 243 Ida that enabled the Galileo spacecraft to obtain the first close-up images of an asteroid, and worked with Paul Chodas on the predictions for the impacts of Comet Shoemaker–Levy 9 with Jupiter in July 1994.

Yeomans was radio science team chief for the Near Earth Asteroid Rendezvous mission from 1994 to 2001, and a co-investigator on the Deep Impact and EPOXI projects, which delivered an impactor to comet Tempel 1 in July 2005 and flew past comet Hartley 2 in November 2010. In 1998 he was named project scientist for the American contribution to the Japanese MUSES-C sample return mission, then intended to visit the asteroid 4660 Nereus; flown as Hayabusa, it returned material from Itokawa in 2010.

As manager of the Near-Earth Object Program Office, Yeomans was responsible for coordinating the detection and tracking of asteroids and comets approaching the Earth. Annual funding for the search rose from $4 million at the program's inception in 1998 to $20 million in 2012, and was doubled again to $40 million after the Chelyabinsk meteor of February 2013. He gave oral testimony to the House Subcommittee on Space and Aeronautics on 8 November 2007, and testified on behalf of NASA before the United Nations Committee on the Peaceful Uses of Outer Space in February 2013. He has written more than 160 professional publications and five books, the most recent being Near-Earth Objects: Finding Them Before They Find Us (2012).

== Awards and honours ==
Yeomans received the NASA Exceptional Service Medal in 1986, a Space Act Award in 1998 for the Horizons On-Line Ephemeris and Data System, and the NASA Distinguished Service Medal, the agency's highest award, in 2009. The asteroid 2956 was renamed 2956 Yeomans in his honour in 1986. In 2013 the Division for Planetary Sciences of the American Astronomical Society awarded him the Carl Sagan Medal for public communication, its citation describing him as the scientist whom journalists approached for measured comment on asteroid impacts. That year he was also included in the Time list of the hundred most influential people in the world, in its pioneers category, in a profile written by the Apollo 9 astronaut Rusty Schweickart.
