= Harry Stevenson Southam =

Canadian newspaper publisher

- Born: May 18, 1875; London, Ontario
- Died: March 27, 1954 (aged 78); Ottawa, Ontario
- Known for: newspaper publisher

Harry Stevenson Southam, CMG (May 18, 1875 – March 27, 1954) was a Canadian newspaper publisher of The Ottawa Citizen and chancellor of Carleton College from 1952 to 1954.

He was chairman and member of the board of trustees of the National Gallery of Canada from 1929 to 1953.

He was appointed a Companion of the Order of St Michael and St George in 1935.

Southam Hall on the campus of Carleton University is named after him.

Academic offices
Preceded by New position	Chancellor of Carleton College; 1952–1954	Succeeded by Jack Mackenzie
