= Robert D. Kaplan =

American author (born 1952)

Robert Kaplan
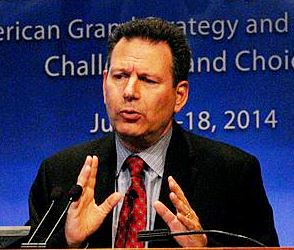
- Kaplan in 2014
- Born: Robert David Kaplan; June 23, 1952 (age 74); New York City, New York, U.S.

Education
- Education: University of Connecticut (BA)

Philosophical work
- School: Neorealism
- Institutions: United States Naval Academy, Center for a New American Security, Foreign Policy Research Institute
- Main interests: International relations, Geopolitics

Robert David Kaplan (born June 23, 1952) is an American author. His books are on politics, primarily foreign affairs, and travel. His work over three decades has appeared in The Atlantic, The Washington Post, The New York Times, The New Republic, The National Interest, Foreign Affairs and The Wall Street Journal, among other publications.

One of Kaplan's most influential articles is "The Coming Anarchy", published in The Atlantic Monthly in 1994. Critics of the article have compared it to Samuel P. Huntington's Clash of Civilizations thesis, since Kaplan presents conflicts in the contemporary world as the struggle between primitivism and civilizations. Another frequent theme in Kaplan's work is the reemergence of cultural and historical tensions temporarily suspended during the Cold War.

From 2008 to 2012, Kaplan was a Senior Fellow at the Center for a New American Security in Washington, DC; he rejoined the organization in 2015. Between 2012 and 2014, he was chief geopolitical analyst at Stratfor, a private global forecasting firm. In 2009, Secretary of Defense Robert Gates appointed Kaplan to the Defense Policy Board, a federal advisory committee to the United States Department of Defense. In 2011 and 2012, Foreign Policy magazine named Kaplan one of the world's "top 100 global thinkers". In 2017, Kaplan joined Eurasia Group, a political risk consultancy, as a senior advisor. In 2020, he was named the Robert Strausz-Hupé Chair in Geopolitics at the Foreign Policy Research Institute. In 2026, he was named Distinguished Senior Lecturer at the University of Texas at Austin.

== Early life and career ==
Kaplan grew up in Far Rockaway in a Jewish family, son of Philip Alexander Kaplan and Phyllis Quasha. Kaplan's father, a truck driver for the New York Daily News, instilled in him an interest in history from an early age. He attended the University of Connecticut on a swimming scholarship, taking newswriting classes with Evan Hill, and earned a BA in English in 1973. He has one sibling, an older brother, Stephen Kaplan.

After graduating, Kaplan applied unsuccessfully to several big-city newsrooms. He was a reporter for the Rutland Herald in Vermont before buying a one-way plane ticket to Tunisia. Over the next several years, he lived in Israel, where he joined the Israeli army, traveled and reported on Eastern Europe and the Middle East, lived for some time in Portugal and eventually settled down in Athens, Greece, where he met his wife. He lives with his wife in Massachusetts.

Kaplan is not related to journalist Lawrence Kaplan, with whom he is occasionally confused. He is also sometimes confused with neoconservative scholar Robert Kagan.

In addition to his journalism, Kaplan has been a consultant to the U.S. Army's Special Forces, the United States Marines, and the United States Air Force. He has lectured at military war colleges, the FBI, the National Security Agency, the Pentagon's Joint Chiefs of Staff, major universities, the CIA, and business forums, and has appeared on PBS, NPR, C-SPAN, and Fox News. He is a senior fellow at the Foreign Policy Research Institute. In 2001, he briefed President Bush. He is the recipient of the 2001 Greenway-Winship Award for Excellence in international reporting. In 2002, he was awarded the United States State Department Distinguished Public Service Award. Kaplan is the recipient of the International Award for 2016 from the Sociedad Geografica Espanola in Madrid, presented by Queen Sofia of Spain.

In 2006–08, Kaplan was a visiting professor at the United States Naval Academy, Annapolis, where he taught a course called "Future Global Security Challenges". As of 2023 he is the Robert Strausz-Hupé Chair in Geopolitics at FPRI.

== Foreign correspondent career ==
Kaplan traveled to Iraq to cover the Iran–Iraq War in 1984. He first worked as a freelance foreign correspondent reporting on Eastern Europe and the Middle East, but slowly expanded his coverage to all regions ignored in the popular press. His first book, Surrender or Starve: The Wars Behind The Famine (1988), contended the famine in Ethiopia in the 1980s was more complex than just drought, blaming instead the collectivization carried out by the Mengistu regime.

Kaplan then went to Afghanistan to write about the guerrilla war against the Soviet Union for Reader's Digest. Two years after writing Surrender or Starve, he wrote and published Soldiers of God: With the Mujahidin in Afghanistan (1990), in which he recounted his experiences during the Soviet–Afghan War.

== Balkan Ghosts and The Arabists ==
Kaplan's third book, Balkan Ghosts, was rejected by several editors before being published in 1993. At first, it did not sell well. After the Yugoslav Wars broke out, President Bill Clinton was seen with Kaplan's book tucked under his arm, and White House insiders and aides said that the book convinced Clinton not to intervene in Bosnia. Kaplan criticized the administration for using the book to justify non-intervention, but his popularity skyrocketed shortly thereafter, along with demand for his reporting. That same year, he also published The Arabists.

External videos
- Booknotes interview with Kaplan on The Ends of the Earth, April 21, 1996, C-SPAN
- Presentation by Kaplan on An Empire Wilderness, September 17, 1998, C-SPAN

In 1994 and 1995, he set out to travel from West Africa to Turkey, Central Asia to Iran, and India to Southeast Asia, and published a travelogue about his journey in The Ends of the Earth. He then traveled across his home country and North America and wrote An Empire Wilderness, published in 1998.

== "The Coming Anarchy" ==
External videos
- Presentation by Kaplan on The Coming Anarchy, March 7, 2000, C-SPAN
- Presentation by Kaplan on Eastward to Tartary, December 11, 2020, C-SPAN

His article "The Coming Anarchy", published in The Atlantic in February 1994, was about how population increase, urbanization, and resource depletion are undermining fragile governments across the developing world and represent a threat to the developed world. It was hotly debated and widely translated. In 2000, Kaplan published the article and other essays in a book with the same title, which also included the controversial article "Was Democracy Just a Moment?" His travels through the Balkans, Turkey, the Caucasus, and the Middle East at the turn of the millennium were recorded in Eastward to Tartary.

For The New York Times, reviewer Richard Bernstein wrote that Kaplan "conveys a historically informed tragic sense in recognizing humankind's tendency toward a kind of slipshod, gooey, utopian and ultimately dangerous optimism."

== After 9/11 ==
External videos
- Interview with Kaplan on Warrior Politics, January 9, 2002, C-SPAN

Demand for Kaplan's unorthodox analysis became more acute after the September 11, 2001, attacks on New York City and Washington, D.C. In his book Warrior Politics: Why Leadership Demands a Pagan Ethos, published shortly after 9/11, Kaplan argues that political and business leaders should discard Christian/Jewish morality in public decision-making in favor of a pagan morality focused on the result rather than the means. He also published a pure travel book, Mediterranean Winter.

=== Support for the Iraq War ===
Kaplan, along with Fareed Zakaria of Newsweek, has been described by American pundit Glenn Greenwald as one of many prominent journalists advocating support for the Iraq War.

Kaplan participated in a secret meeting convened by the then Deputy Secretary of Defense Paul D. Wolfowitz, at which he helped draft an internal government document advocating the invasion of Iraq. He later concluded that the war had been a mistake and expressed deep remorse for supporting it.

In his 2023 book The Tragic Mind: Fear, Fate, and the Burden of Power, Kaplan writes that he suffered from clinical depression due to the loss of American and Iraqi lives he believed his support for the Iraq War indirectly caused. Similarly, he expresses difficulty grappling with the impact of his book Balkan Ghosts, which he believes led the Clinton administration to neglect the genocide in southeastern Europe.

=== Criticism of Donald Trump ===
Although Kaplan expresses sympathy for the many white blue collar voters who chose U.S. President Donald Trump in the 2016 election, in the book Earning the Rockies, he is critical of Trump on foreign policy and national security. Kaplan has argued that Trump's defense and foreign policy rely too heavily on military spending, calling it "American Caesarism". He has drawn parallels between Trump's focus on a militaristic image and large reductions to "soft" non-military foreign policy efforts with the gradual decline of the Roman Empire as a result of similar excess. Kaplan sees Trump's spending plans for national security and foreign policy as the first stage of a "tragic decline" for the United States. On foreign policy more broadly, Kaplan has called Trump "a terrible messenger for realism" who "appears to have no sense of history".

=== Criticism of neoconservatives ===
In The Tragic Mind: Fear, Fate, and the Burden of Power, Kaplan expresses disillusionment with neoconservative foreign policy, in particular the idea of democracy promotion through military force. He argues that this policy is based on uninformed optimism that ignores the tragic nature of reality. Kaplan contrasts neoconservative policy with the less ideologically motivated paradigm of realism. He argues that politicians can benefit from a humanistic understanding of Shakespearean and Greek tragedy to prevent neoconservatism and ideological foreign policy from causing significant loss of life or resources.

=== Imperial Grunts ===
External videos
- Presentation by Kaplan on Imperial Grunts, October 4, 2005, C-SPAN

Kaplan's book Imperial Grunts: The American Military on the Ground was published in 2005. In it, he tells of US Special Forces on the ground across the globe in Colombia, Mongolia, the Philippines, Afghanistan and Iraq. Kaplan predicts that the age of mass infantry warfare is probably over and writes that the conflict in Iraq caught the United States Army between being a "dinosaur" and a "light and lethal force of the future." He reports that many soldiers view certain parts of the world where they are operating as "Injun Country," which must be civilized by the same methods used to subdue the American Frontier in the 1800s.

He also analyzes the revival of Confederate military virtue in the US armed forces. Kaplan was embedded with U.S. troops in Iraq and wrote an often-cited report for The Atlantic titled "Five Days in Fallujah" about the spring 2004 campaign. In June 2005, he wrote the cover story for The Atlantic titled "How We Would Fight China", which suggests the inevitability of a Cold War-type situation between the US and China. In October 2006, he wrote "When North Korea Falls" for the same magazine; in it, he examines the prospect of North Korea's collapse and its effect on the balance of power in Asia in favor of China.

=== Hog Pilots ===
External videos
- Presentation by Kaplan on Hog Pilots, Blue Water Grunts, September 5, 2007, C-SPAN

Kaplan's book Hog Pilots, Blue Water Grunts: The American Military in the Air, at Sea, and on the Ground, published in 2007 by Random House, reflects his continuing interest in the US Armed Forces.

=== Monsoon ===
External videos
- Presentation by Kaplan on Monsoon, November 8, 2010, C-SPAN

Monsoon: The Indian Ocean and the Future of American Power (2010) is about the Indian Ocean region and the future of energy supplies and maritime trade routes in the 21st century. Kaplan writes that the Indian Ocean has been a center of power for a long time and that the shift to the Atlantic can be seen as an anomaly that will be set straight in future years. For the United States to maintain its power, it will have to link its goals with those of the people of the developing world, he concludes.

=== The Revenge of Geography ===
External videos
- Presentation by Kaplan on The Revenge of Geography, September 13, 2012, C-SPAN

- Presentation by Kaplan on The Revenge of Geography, November 2018, YouTube

- Presentation by Kaplan on The Revenge of Geography, November 2014, YouTube

The Revenge of Geography: What the Map Tells Us About Coming Conflicts and the Battle Against Fate (2012) The Book describes how a country's social relations (including government and other institutions) and culture are a product of the geographical characteristic in which they develop. For example, society's relation with the ocean or river and other geographical phenomena like climate. Moreover, he acknowledges the geographical boundaries like oceans and mountains as established or "natural" limits between nations which help to bring peace. Pointing out one of the reasons that the Middle East is a conflictive region. He explores the use of Rimland and Heartland Geopolitical terms of the XIX century to explain the importance of the Euroasian steppe (Modern day Russia). The rest of the book highlights each region of the world and explores its relations among states and the geography that constitutes the region. e.g. Russia and its relation with central Asia and the rest of Europe. The book also focuses on how demographic shifts in countries will affect them in the future. It is important to point out that he gives no comment about Africa or Oceania whatsoever.

The main argument of the book wishes to prove geography as one of the main factors to construct a nation, although it is not limited to it.

=== Asia's Cauldron ===
External videos
- Presentation by Kaplan on Asia's Cauldron, March 24, 2014, C-SPAN

Asia's Cauldron (2014) describes the modern (from the colonial era to the present) cultural and political history of the various countries of Southeast Asia (such as Singapore, Vietnam and the Philippines) and the region's geopolitical significance to China, as well as those states' resultant anxiety over Chinese maritime territorial claims in the region.

=== In Europe's Shadow ===
External videos
- Q&A interview with Kaplan on In Europe's Shadow, March 6, 2016, C-SPAN

In Europe's Shadow (2016) is one of Kaplan's most personal examinations of the influence of geography and civilization on politics and history. Informed by his travels to the Balkans since the 1970s, Kaplan links Romania's contemporary political and social reality to its complex identity and history. While the book echoes many of Kaplan's earlier historical travelogues, it looks ahead to the challenges Europe will face by examining Romania as a microcosm of Europe's coming geopolitical crises.

=== The Return of Marco Polo's World ===
The Return of Marco Polo's World: War, Strategy, and American Interests in the Twenty-first Century (2018) is a collection of Kaplan's post-2000 essays on the evolving system in Eurasia. Commissioned by the Pentagon's Office of Net Assessment, the book's lead essay draws parallels between Eurasia's contemporary emergence as a single "battlespace" to its 13th-century geopolitics, when China last constructed a land bridge to Europe. The book's other essays, published in a range of analytical and journalistic sources, delve into themes such as technology, globalization, and the misguided application of military power. Together they paint a portrait of American influence and European cohesion on the decline in the face of a rapidly emergent new order in Eurasia.

== Influences ==
Kaplan is an admirer of the work of John Mearsheimer, a University of Chicago-based realist political scientist whom Kaplan's books occasionally cite. Kaplan's predictions in The Coming Anarchy dovetail in part with Mearsheimer's predictions for the future of Post-Cold War Europe. Kaplan's stance on Mearsheimer's work is addressed in an essay in The Atlantic, titled "Why John J. Mearsheimer is right (about some things)". The essay was written largely in response to Mearsheimer's stance in his controversial 2007 book The Israel Lobby and U.S. Foreign Policy, which was negatively received and described as an anti-Israel polemic by several reviewers. In the same essay, Kaplan defends the theory of offensive realism Mearsheimer advocates against claims that it entails hawkish or neoconservative foreign policy.

Additionally, Kaplan draws on the classical realism of Hans Morgenthau. He also frequently refers to the geographer Halford Mackinder and his once-influential Heartland theory, along with the theories of Nicholas Spykman and Alfred Thayer Mahan.

== Criticisms and controversy ==
Kaplan's arguments have been criticised on various grounds. Some of his more controversial articles, such as "The Ruins of Empire in the Middle East" and "In Defense of Empire", have been criticized for alluding to empires, and, implicitly, imperialism, as a prosperous, stabilizing force and a net positive for humanity.

Political geographer Nick Megoran argues that "for geographers, Kaplan's article [The Revenge of Geography] makes dismal reading". The article, in Megoran's view, takes theories of classical geopolitical scholars like Halford Mackinder out of their socio-historical context. Kaplan's writing contributes to an "unwelcome return" to what Megoran loosely perceives as militarist-imperialist discourses in traditional geopolitics. This study and approach, due to its historical associations, is considered a discredited field by academic geographers, but Megoran objects to its influence on Kaplan and on the foreign policy of states.

=== Environmental determinism ===
Academic geographer Harm de Blij criticized Kaplan's book The Revenge of Geography for tending toward what de Blij interpreted as environmental determinism. He also argued that the book fails to acknowledge thinkers associated with postmodern schools of geographic thought, such as critical geopolitics. Finally, he calls the book one of several "misleading" books on geography by non-formally trained geographers that misrepresent the field to those unfamiliar with it (other examples de Blij names include Thomas Friedman's The World Is Flat and Jared Diamond's Guns, Germs, and Steel).

=== Orientalism and Balkanism ===
Dag Tuastad, senior lecturer of Middle East and Africa at the University of Oslo, claims that Kaplan, "like Huntington (author of Clash of Civilizations), perpetuates a neo-Orientalist sentiment, namely, emphasizing 'features innately embedded in the Muslim religion, including the provision that Islam is a religion of the sword and a religion that glorifies military virtues'".

Istvan Deak, Columbia University Professor Emeritus of History, labels Balkan Ghosts "an often delightful romp through the past and present politics of a region," saying that Kaplan "intends to convince us, and he assuredly does, with gusto, that the peoples of these five alienated countries do indeed form an unhappy whole." Balkan Ghosts was chosen by the editors of The New York Times as one of the best books of 1993. Balkan Ghosts received heavy criticism from Balkan scholars, primarily for the work's implication that the Balkan peoples have an innate predisposition for violence. For instance, Vesna Goldsworthy criticises his opinion that Nazism has Balkan origins, noting that "no-one would think of blaming the hapless Balkans for the triumphs of Austria's composers." In his review, Henry R. Cooper, labelled the work a "dreadful mix of unfounded generalizations, misinformation, outdated sources, personal prejudices and bad writing." Noel Malcolm took a similarly dim view, remarking after an exchange with Kaplan in the National Interest that "the basic problem, I think, is that Mr. Kaplan cannot read."

== Recognition ==
In 2012, Kaplan was named by Foreign Policy magazine on its list of top global thinkers.

== Bibliography ==
=== Books ===
- Kaplan, Robert D. (1980). Carta's guide to Israel and Jordan. Jerusalem: Carta. ISBN 965-220-023-9.
- Kaplan, Robert D. (2003) [1988]. Surrender or Starve: Travels in Ethiopia, Sudan, Somalia, and Eritrea. Vintage. ISBN 978-1-4000-3452-9.
- Kaplan, Robert D. (2001) [1990]. Soldiers of God: With Islamic Warriors in Afghanistan and Pakistan. Vintage. ISBN 978-1-4000-3025-5.
- Kaplan, Robert D. (2005). Balkan Ghosts: A Journey Through History. Picador. ISBN 978-0-312-42493-0., published February 1993, reprinted March 1994
- — (1993). Arabists : the romance of an American elite. New York: Free Press. ISBN 002916785X.
- — (1996). The ends of the earth : a journey at the dawn of the 21st century. New York: Random House. ISBN 0679431489.
  - Reprinted as: The ends of the earth : from Togo to Turkmenistan, from Iran to Cambodia – a journey to the frontiers of anarchy. Peter Smith. 2000. ISBN 978-0-8446-7124-6.
- Kaplan, Robert D. (1999) [1998]. An Empire Wilderness: Travels into America's Future. Vintage. ISBN 978-0-679-77687-1.
- Kaplan, Robert D. (2001). The Coming Anarchy: Shattering the Dreams of the Post Cold War. Vintage. ISBN 978-0-375-70759-9.
- Kaplan, Robert D. (2001) [2000]. Eastward to Tartary: Travels in the Balkans, the Middle East, and the Caucasus. Vintage. ISBN 978-0-375-70576-2.
- Kaplan, Robert D. (2003) [2001]. Warrior Politics: Why Leadership Demands a Pagan Ethos. Vintage. ISBN 978-0-375-72627-9.
- Kaplan, Robert D. (2004). Mediterranean Winter: The Pleasures of History and Landscape in Tunisia, Sicily, Dalmatia, and Greece. Random House. ISBN 978-0-375-50804-2.
- Kaplan, Robert D. (2006) [2005]. Imperial Grunts: On the Ground with the American Military, from Mongolia to the Philippines to Iraq and Beyond. Vintage. ISBN 978-1-4000-3457-4.
- Kaplan, Robert D. (2007). Hog Pilots, Blue Water Grunts: The American Military in the Air, at Sea, and on the Ground. Random House. ISBN 978-1-4000-6133-4.
- Kaplan, Robert D. (2010). Monsoon: The Indian Ocean and The Future of American Power. Random House. ISBN 978-1-4000-6746-6.
- Kaplan, Robert D. (2012). The Revenge of Geography: What the Map Tells Us About Coming Conflicts and the Battle Against Fate. Random House. ISBN 978-1-4000-6983-5.
- Kaplan, Robert D. (2014). Asia's Cauldron: The South China Sea and the End of a Stable Pacific. Random House. ISBN 978-0-8129-9432-2.
- Kaplan, Robert D. (2016). In Europe's Shadow: Two Cold Wars and a Thirty-Year Journey Through Romania and Beyond. Penguin Random House. ISBN 9780812996814.
- Robert D. Kaplan (2017). Earning the Rockies: How Geography Shapes America's Role in the World. ISBN 9780399588235
- Robert D. Kaplan (2018). The Return of Marco Polo's World: War, Strategy and American Interests in the Twenty-First Century. Random House. ISBN 978-0-8129-9679-1
- Robert D. Kaplan (2021). The Good American: The Epic Life of Bob Gersony, The U.S. Government's Greatest Humanitarian Random House.
- Robert D. Kaplan (2022). Adriatic: A Concert of Civilizations at the End of the Modern Age. Random House. ISBN 978-0-3995-9104-4
- Kaplan, Robert D. (2023). The Tragic Mind: Fear, Fate, and the Burden of Power. Yale University Press. ISBN 978-0300263862.
- Kaplan, Robert D. (2023). The Loom of Time: Between Empire and Anarchy, from the Mediterranean to China. Random House. ISBN 978-0593242797.
- Kaplan, Robert D. (2025). Waste Land: A World in Permanent Crisis. Random House. ISBN 9780593730324.

Contributions to other books

- Gafni, Shlomo S.; A. van der Heyden (1980). Lotan, Yael (ed.). The Glory of the Holy Land. Robert D. Kaplan (research). Jerusalem: Steimatzky's Agency: Jerusalem Publishing House.
- Conrad, Joseph (2000). "Introduction". Lord Jim & Nostromo. Modern Library. ISBN 978-0-375-75489-0.
- Travelers Tales Turkey: True Stories. Travelers' Tales. 2002. ISBN 978-1-885211-82-8. (Contributor)
- Gogol, Nikolai (2003). "Introduction". Taras Bulba. Modern Library Classics. ISBN 978-0-8129-7119-4.

=== Essays and reporting ===
- — (August 1996). "Proportionalism". Notes & Comment. The Atlantic Monthly. 278 (2): 16, 20.
- Kaplan, Robert D. (Spring 2003). "America and the Tragic Limits of Imperialism" (PDF). The Hedgehog Review. Institute for Advanced Studies in Culture, University of Virginia. pp. 56–76. Archived from the original (PDF) on July 11, 2012.
- Kaplan, Robert D. (June 2005). "How We Would Fight China". The Atlantic.
- Kaplan, Robert D. (April 2014). "In Defense of Empire". The Atlantic.
- Kaplan, Robert D. (June 2015). "The Art of Avoiding War". The Atlantic.
- Kaplan, Robert D. (May 26, 2017). "Trump's Budget Is American Caesarism". Foreign Policy.

== See also ==
- Geopolitics
- Pax Americana
- Ralph Peters
