= Aslam Anis =

Bangladeshi-Canadian health economist

Aslam H. Anis
- Born: April 29, 1959 (age 67)
- Education: University of Dhaka, Carleton University
- Known for: Health economics
- Spouse: Janet Anis (née Disanjh)
- Children: 2
- Awards: Fellow of the Canadian Academy of Health Sciences (2010)
- Scientific career
- Fields: Health Economics, Health Services Research, Pharmacoeconomics
- Workplaces: University of British Columbia

Aslam Anis is a Bangladeshi-Canadian health economist whose primary areas of research involvement include health services research, measuring patient-reported outcomes, Canadian competition policy in the pharmaceutical industry, and the cost-effectiveness of treatments for HIV/AIDS, rheumatoid arthritis, and other conditions.

== Biography ==
=== Early life ===
Aslam Hayat Anis was born in Dhaka, Bangladesh (then known as Dacca, East Pakistan) to a Bengali family. His father Anis Waiz (1935 – 2003) was a professor of medicine and founding principal of Bangladesh Medical College. Anis's mother, Rokaiya Anis (née Ahad) (1935 – 2018), was a clinician in gynaecology and obstetrics who participated in the 1952 Language Movement. She joined the Pakistan Army as a civilian medical officer and later ran the gynaecology and obstetrics department at the Combined Military Hospital.

=== Academic career ===
Anis completed his BSS (Honours) in economics at the University of Dhaka (1981) and his MA and PhD in economics at Carleton University (1983, 1990). He joined the faculty of the University of British Columbia Faculty of Medicine, School of Population and Public Health (then called the Department of Health Care & Epidemiology) in 1995. He was appointed as a full professor in the school in 2005. From 2002 to 2013, Anis served as the director of the Masters of Health Administration (MHA) program in the UBC Faculty of Medicine. He is the National Co-director of the CIHR Pan-Canadian Network for HIV and STBBI Clinical Trials Research (CTN+) and the Director of the Centre for Health Evaluation and Outcome Sciences in Vancouver, British Columbia. Anis is currently the Director of the School of Population and Public Health at UBC.

=== Research ===
Anis's research spans several areas, including pharmaceutical pricing and regulation, pharmacoeconomic policy, economic decision analysis, measure of work productivity, arthritis, HIV/AIDS, and addictions research. His work has been used to shape economic and health policies across Canada.

His earliest research in the pharmaceuticals showed that pricing regulations of drug plans were responsible for higher generic drug prices in Canada. In 1995, as the founding director of the Pharmacoeconomic Initiative of BC, Anis developed a framework under which firms seeking to list drugs on the provincial formulary were required to submit cost-effectiveness data in order to inform the government's funding decision.

Anis was among the first scholars worldwide to demonstrate the cost-effectiveness of anti-retroviral therapy for HIV. This work changed policies governing access to this critical treatment for persons living with HIV/AIDS in British Columbia.

He led the health economic analysis for North American Opiate Management Initiative (NAOMI) clinical trial and the Study to Assess Longer-term Opioid Medication Effectiveness (SALOME) clinical trial. These clinical trials were the first of their kind in North America and demonstrated the safety, efficacy, and cost-effectiveness of injectable diacetylmorphine (medical-grade heroin) and hydromorphone (Dilaudid) in treating people with long-term opioid use disorder. In response to this research and other work, the Canadian government amended regulations to improve access to medically prescribed injectable opioids.

== Honours, decorations, awards and distinctions ==
In 2010, Anis was appointed as a Fellow of the Canadian Academy of Health Sciences.
