= Sheridan Scott =

Sheridan Scott is the former Commissioner of Competition (2004–09) of the Competition Bureau of Canada. She joined the Ottawa office of law firm Bennett Jones in March 2009 after leaving the Bureau.

A 1981 graduate in law from the University of Victoria, Scott is a member of the Law Society of Upper Canada. She worked for the Canadian Radio-television and Telecommunications Commission (CRTC), the Canadian Broadcasting Corporation, and Bell Canada before being appointed to the Competition Bureau.
