= Petronila Cleto =

Filipino writer and social activist

- Born: 1945; Philippines
- Died: January 11, 2018 (aged 72)
- Other names: Pet
- Occupation: writer
- Children: Cynthia Cleto

Petronila Cleto (October 18, 1945 – January 11, 2018), also known by her nickname Pet, was a Filipino writer and social activist best known for her advocacy work for women's rights in Ontario, Canada.

== Early life and education ==
Petronila Galicia Cleto was born on October 18, 1945, in the province of Nueva Ecija. She found a strong affinity with writing early on.

In the late 1960s, she went to Canada. She studied medical technology and took literature classes at Carleton University. She returned to Manila a few years after.

Within the Philippines, Cleto is best known as a newspaper reporter and art/film critic. In the mid-1970s, while covering the Manila Film Festival, she produced a series of acclaimed profiles, critiques and interviews with such distinguished directors as Akira Kurosawa, Werner Herzog and Gillo Pontecorvo. In 2004 she was named as one of the country's leading film reviewers by the national association of film critics.

== Political life ==
Early in the 1980s, she became a founding member of many women's organizations in the Philippines, among them: GABRIELA (General Assembly Binding Women for Reforms, Integrity, Equality, Leadership, and Action), WOMB (Women for the Ouster of Marcos and Boycott), Concerned Mothers League and the first Philippine women's political party KAIBA (Kababaihan para sa Inang Bayan).

== Exile and later years ==
In 1991, Cleto moved back to Canada, where she joined PEN Canada, whose International Writers in Exile Network has helped establish the position of International Writer-in-Residence at several Canadian Universities, including McMaster University (2008) and was a lecturer at George Brown College (2010).

She was a regular writer for Toronto's The Philippine Reporter, and co-hosted broadcast shows Radyo Migrante and TV Migrante.

In 2008, Cleto was one of the founding members of women's group Gabriela Ontario, and helped organize various campaigns advocating for temporary foreign workers and care workers in particular.

She died aged 72 due to complications related to multiple organ failure at St. Michael's Hospital on January 11, 2018.

== Legacy ==
In recognition of her years of service to the Greater Toronto Area, she was given posthumously the Golden Balangay Lifetime Achievement Award in 2018.

=== Books ===
- Akdaan 1 Literary Anthology (2013)
- Akdaan 2 Literary Anthology (2015)

=== Plays ===
- Operetang Tatlong Kusing – Filipino adaptation of Bertold Brecht's Three Penny Opera
- Pasintabi Sa Nuno (To Our Ancestors) – performed at the Nancy International Theatre Festival in France

== See also ==
- Filipino community in Toronto
- Filipino Canadians
