= Norm O'Reilly =

Canadian academic, accountant

Norman O'Reilly
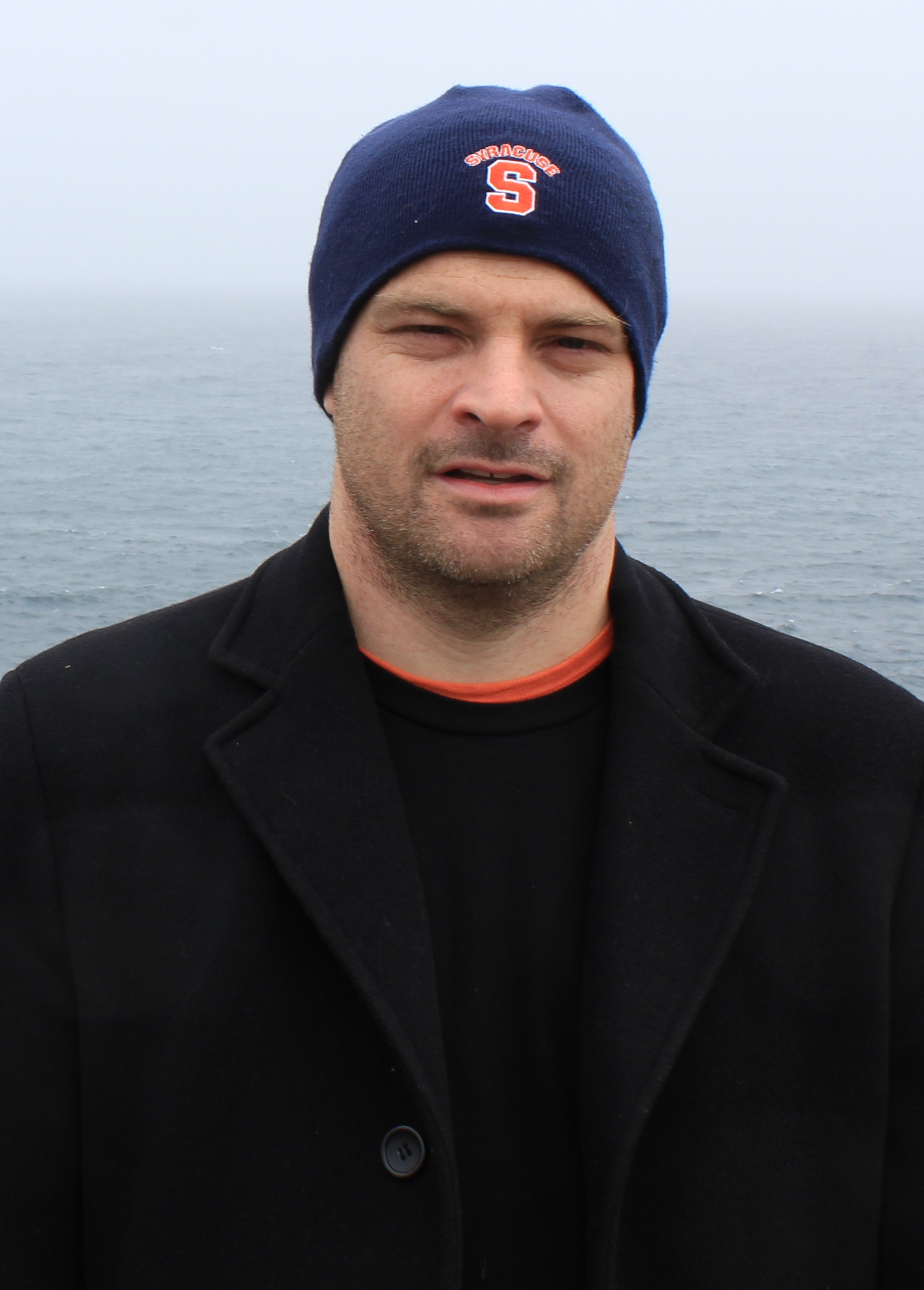
- Occupations: Applied academic, chartered professional accountant and researcher
- Awards: Distinguished Career Achievement Award by American Marketing Association "Five to Watch" in Canadian Sport Business Under 40 Award

Academic background
- Education: BSc. in Kinesiology; M.A. in Sports Administration; MBA in Marketing; Ph.D. in Management; Chartered Professional Accountant
- Alma mater: University of Waterloo; University of Ottawa; Carleton University
- Thesis: Sponsorship Evaluation (PhD) Economic impact of Amateur Sport (MBA)

Academic work
- Institutions: University of Guelph

Norm O'Reilly is a Canadian academic, chartered professional accountant and researcher. He is a Professor in Department of Sport Management, and Director of the Sport Sponsorship Lab, within the College of Health & Human Performance, at the University of Florida. Previously, he was the inaugural dean of the University of New England's College of Business. He joined UNE after two decades of leadership experience in higher education, including as the dean of the Graduate School of Business at the University of Maine. He is a partner consultant at the T1 Agency and editor of the Emerging Issues and Trends in Sport Business series of books by World Scientific Publishing.

O'Reilly has authored or co-authored 15 books and more than 140 publications in the areas of marketing analytics, sponsorship, social media, sport finance, social marketing, tourism marketing, and management education. His books include Social Media in Sport, Sport Marketing: A Canadian Perspective, Public-Private Partnerships in Physical Activity and Sport and Sport Business Unplugged: Leadership Challenges from the World of Sports, among others.

O'Reilly was awarded the Career Achievement Award by the American Marketing Association's Sport Marketing Special Interest Group in 2015. He is a lifetime research fellow of the North American Society for Sport Management and also a fellow of Institute for Innovation and Entrepreneurship at Mount Royal University. He is also an athlete and has represented Canada as an age-grouper at World Long Distance Championships several times. He won the Chemong Lake Triathlon overall in 2019.

== Education ==
O'Reilly completed his bachelor's degree in kinesiology from the University of Waterloo in 1997. He completed his Master studies in Sports Administration in 1998 and his MBA with majors in Marketing in 2000, both from the University of Ottawa. In 2007, O'Reilly completed his doctoral studies in management from Carleton University's Eric Sprott School of Business. He received his Chartered Professional Accountant certification in 2009.

== Career ==
After his MBA, O'Reilly taught as a Part-Time Professor at University of Ottawa for three years before joining Laurentian University as an assistant professor from 2002 till 2003. He then taught at Ryerson University for three years. From 2006 until 2009, he was an associate professor at Laurentian University. O'Reilly then moved to New York and taught as an Associate Professor for one year at Syracuse University before coming back to Canada and joining the University of Ottawa as an associate professor from 2010 until 2014. He was the Richard P. and Joan S. Fox Professor at Ohio University from 2014 till 2018. O'Reilly took up a Professorial position at University of Guelph's Lang School of Business & Economics in 2018 and was the Founding Director of International Institute for Sport Business and Leadership. In 2021, O'Reilly left University of Guelph and joined The University of Maine as Dean of the Graduate School of Business.

O'Reilly was appointed the Department Chair of Sports Administration at Ohio University from 2014 till 2018. He also served as the Assistant Dean of executive programs at University of Guelph from 2018 till 2020.

In 2007, he became a partner consultant and minority owner at The T1 Agency. He was part of the Mission Staff for Canadian Team for the 2004, 2008 and 2010 Olympic Games and the Deputy Chef of Canadian Team for the 2016 Rio Paralympic Games.

== Research ==
O'Reilly's work is focused in analytics, sponsorship, social media, sport finance, social marketing, tourism management, and management education. One of O'Reilly's early research topics includes his work on education and sport marketing. He authored an article about the pedagogies involved in sports marketing and the use of experiential learning to facilitate the knowledge and skill development in students. He examined the 'Field Trip' course adopted by Laurentian University and discussed how students are involved to work on Client-Based Projects. He has also examined the role of mixed method approach in research about sports marketing. O'Reilly conducted content analysis of articles published over two decades. His research revealed that the use of mixed method approach in sports marketing addressed several important research questions.

O'Reilly's research about sponsorships started alongside his work on sports marketing in mid 2000s. He included the financial perspective in his research about activating sponsorships. He researched on the activation ratio of sponsorships to address the limited sponsorship implementation in the industry. By conducting an exploratory research and using a case study, O'Reilly studied various drivers, possible methods and the appropriate expenditures for activation ratio of sponsorships and then presented a four step model incorporating all the related variables.

O'Reilly has also conducted research about sport participation. He used the environmental deterministic perspective in his study about the sports participation. He examined the role of 'sportscape' in encouraging youth participation in sports. The results from conducting a case study relating to geography of sports indicated that the geography of sport is also dependent on the infrastructure used, along with the location of sports venues. O'Reilly stressed upon the importance of quality and capacity of sportscape along with other variables. He also examined the potential of using experimental design methods in the study of sports management. O'Reilly discussed the involvement of Playoff Safely Bias in an individual's decision-making process when selecting a sport from the sequential gold heuristic. He conducted an experiment on undergraduate students using consumer psychology approach. He found that individuals had similar estimations about the number of playoff teams, when they were first conditioned to maximize the number of playoff appearances.

One of O'Reilly's significant research areas is the study of mega-events, tourism marketing and business. He studied the tourist's view about China, its inhabitants and the 2008 Olympic Games held in the country by conducting a research survey with tourists present during the aforementioned games. His results proved that China's images as a country, destination and mega-event host were interrelated. His research addressed the existing gap in the image based research of the mega-events. He conducted research on the sponsorship outcomes of mega-events and host countries. He also addressed the cameo effect on the host country, mega-event and sponsor images. O'Reilly's research suggested that the host city has a cameo effect on the tourists during a mega-event, while the event itself has a cameo effect on the natives of the host city.

In the second half of the 2000s, O'Reilly conducted research on social marketing and authored an article focusing on sponsorships in the context of social marketing. He then conducted an empirical research study on how to formulate and implement a sponsorship in order to support a social media marketing campaign about mental health and social stigmas. He further identified the key stakeholders, objectives and development strategies used in the social marketing sponsorship as compared to commercial sponsorships.

== Awards and honors ==
- 2011 - Media Excellence Award, University of Ottawa
- 2012 - Lifetime Research Fellow, North American Society for Sport Management
- 2015 - Inducted into the Lindsay Sports Hall of Fame
- 2015 - Distinguished Career Achievement Award, American Marketing Association
- 2017 - Career Research Impact Award, Ohio University

== Bibliography ==
=== Selected books ===
- Sport Marketing: A Canadian Perspective, (2009) ISBN 978-0176104580
- Global Sports Marketing: Sponsorship, Ambush Marketing and the Olympic Games (2015) ISBN 978-1935412434
- Sports Business Management: Decision-Making Around the Globe, (2016) ISBN 978-1138919549
- The 20 Secrets of Success for a Student-Athlete Who Won't Go Pro, (2018) ISBN 978-0821422953
- Sports Business Management: Decision-Making Around the Globe, 2nd Edition (2020) ISBN 978-0367356064
- Implications and Impacts of eSports on Business and Society: Emerging Research and Opportunities (2020) ISBN 978-1799815389

=== Selected articles ===
- Nadeau, J., Heslop, L., O'Reilly, N, and Luk, P. (2008). "Destination in a Country Image Context", Annals of Tourism Research, 35(1), 84–106.
- Abeza, G., O'Reilly, N., & Reid, I. (2013). Relationship Marketing and Social Media in Sport. International Journal of Sport Communication, 6(2), 120–142.
- O'Reilly, N. & Lafrance Horning, D. (2013). "Leveraging Sponsorship: The Activation Ratio", Sport Management Review, 16(4), 424–437.
- Finch, D., Nadeau, J., and O'Reilly, N. (2013). "The Future of Marketing Education: A Practitioner's Perspective", Journal of Marketing Education, 35(1), 54–67.
- Gibbs, C., O'Reilly, N., & Brunette, M. (2014). "Professional Team Sport and Twitter: Gratifications Sought and Obtained by Followers", International Journal of Sport Communication, 7(2), 188–213
- Preuss, H., Seguin, B. & O'Reilly, N. (2007). Profiling Major Sport Event Visitors: The 2002 Commonwealth Games. Journal of Sport & Tourism, 12(1), 5-23.
