= International Halley Watch =

Halley's Comet, named after English astronomer Edmund Halley who first demonstrated its periodicity, returns to the vicinity of the Sun and Earth approximately every 76 years. Since comets are believed to be the most primordial objects in the Solar System, their study is of great importance to planetary science. At the time of the 1986 return (technically, "apparition") of the comet, astronomical telescopes and related instrumentation were vastly more sensitive than for any previous apparition. Consequently, the International Halley Watch (IHW) was organized to stimulate, standardize, collect, and archive observations of the comet.

The initial plans were formulated by scientists at NASA's Jet Propulsion Laboratory in California, where a Lead Center for western hemisphere observations was established with support from NASA; a corresponding Center for eastern hemisphere observations was funded by the Federal Republic of Germany at the Remeis Observatory (code 521) in Bamberg. An international Steering Group was established, and a set of Discipline Specialists was chosen to organize observing networks, coordinate their activity, and ultimately to collect and archive their data. This effort was endorsed by the International Astronomical Union in 1982, and cometary scientists were chosen as Discipline Specialists in the areas of Astrometry, Infrared Studies, Large Scale Phenomena, Near-Nucleus Studies, Photometry and Polarimetry, Radio Studies, Spectroscopy and Spectrophotometry, Meteor Studies, and Amateur Observations. The IHW also coordinated with the space missions to the comet, Giotto by the European Space Agency and Vega by the Soviet Union and collaborating countries. The collected data were subsequently published as a digital archive on CD-ROMs.
