= The Upside of Down (book) =

2006 book by Thomas Homer-Dixon

The Upside of Down: Catastrophe, Creativity, and the Renewal of Civilization
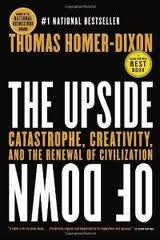
- Author: Thomas Homer-Dixon
- Genre: Non-fiction, Political Science, Social Science
- Publisher: Random House Canada
- Publication date: October 2006
- Media type: Print (Hardcover & Paperback)
- Pages: 448 pp.
- ISBN: 978-0-676-97722-6
- Dewey Decimal: 909.83
- LC Class: HC79.E5 H66 2006

The Upside of Down: Catastrophe, Creativity, and the Renewal of Civilization (ISBN 0-676-97722-7) is a non-fiction book published in 2006 by Thomas Homer-Dixon, a professor who at the time was the director of the Trudeau Centre for Peace and Conflict Studies at University of Toronto.

The book sets out a theory of the growth, crisis, and renewal of societies. The world's converging energy, environmental, and political stresses could cause a breakdown of national and global order. Yet there are things we can do now to keep such a breakdown from being catastrophic. And some kinds of breakdown could even open up extraordinary opportunities for creative, bold reform of our societies, if we are prepared to exploit these opportunities when they arise.

== Content and style ==
The prologue of the book provides an overview of the main argument. It begins in San Francisco during the great 1906 fire that destroyed the city, then moves on to Rome, 2003, with some reflections on the remnants of a once powerful global empire. The prologue finishes with a perilously fast car ride along unfamiliar country roads in dense fog. These three seemingly unrelated accounts illustrate the basic premises of the book: our fate is uncertain, unpredictable devastation can happen at any time, and even the mightiest societies are susceptible to failure due to a variety of complex factors, but there is the hope of catagenesis—"renewal through breakdown."

The ensuing twelve chapters expand on these theories, using many examples from general knowledge to maintain the book's accessibility and common understanding. Through this technique some very complex ideas and crucial terminology are introduced. In chapter one, for instance, we have the explanation of the "tectonic stresses" which could bring down society as we know it if "synchronous failure" were to occur. There is also reference to the "prospective mind", the quality required to help prevent/solve such crises.

== Release and reception ==
The book was released as a hardcover in Canada on October 31, 2006, by publisher Random House of Canada and as paperback, in 2007, under the Vintage Canada imprint. It was published by Island Press in the United States, Souvenir Press in the United Kingdom and by Text Publishing in Australia. To promote the book, Homer-Dixon went on a 22-city book tour, with events in Vancouver, Victoria, Calgary, Hamilton, and an interview on Fareed Zakaria's Foreign Exchange. The book reached number one on the Maclean's non-fiction bestsellers list and peaked at number five on The Globe and Mail list. The book was awarded the 2007 National Business Book Award and a Gold Award from ForeWord Magazine. In 2007, the book was named a best book for 2007 in the politics and religion category by the Financial Times.

Reviewers found the writing clear and accessible, even though the content was not specifically new. Writing in The Globe and Mail, political philosopher Will Kymlicka called it a "clear and accessible overview" though "none of this is particularly new". Similarly, Harold Heft in The Montreal Gazette called Homer-Dixon a "master compiler" of information covered in magazines such as The New Yorker or Harper's. In the Quill & Quire, the reviewer noted, "Although none of the stresses Homer-Dixon speaks about are news, it is very rare to have all of them so deftly assembled and correlated." In the Toronto Star, the reviewer wrote that there "wasn't much in the book that I hadn't read in similarly themed books and articles, but Homer-Dixon's sheer thoroughness and level-headed tone somehow shredded the veil of cognitive dissonance".

The book also received positive reviews, noting the quality of the writing, in Grist, The Ecologist, and Environment. Barbara Julian of the Victoria Times Colonist also addresses the issue of the seeming dearth of solutions in the book and rounds out the argument when she writes in her review: "Every resident of the planet should be capable of joining the discussion about remedies. Thomas Homer-Dixon does his part in providing entry points for readers who are interested, in the form of research sources and websites to consult and to communicate through, including his own." Providing a summary, John Ikenberry wrote in Foreign Affairs: "Homer-Dixon offers a striking vision of how to confront the world of risk and uncertainty, calling for 'resilience-enhancing' strategies that protect food—and energy—supply networks and that can better cope with surprise."

Several reviewers identified the book's ending as its weakness. Kymlicka wrote that "his discussion of what we should do in response to these challenges...[is] disappointing". Heft wrote that the book's weakness was in guessing what Heft called "fictional doomsday scenario[s]" because there are ultimately "an infinite number of possible destinies".

== See also ==
- Progress trap
