= J. J. McAvoy =

Canadian-American writer

J. J. McAvoy (born Judy Onyegbado) is a writer of romance fiction.

== Early life and education ==
McAvoy was born in Montreal, Quebec to Nigerian-born parents. McAvoy is of Igbo descent. She was raised in the United States.

She graduated from Carleton University with a degree in humanities in 2016.

== Writing career ==
McAvoy began writing poetry when she was 12 or 13. She wrote her first novel while in her teens. She stated that she wrote 10 novels in two years. She published her first books when she was a university student.

Her Du Bells series has been noted for its similarities to Julia Quinn's Bridgerton series. About the first novel in the series, Aphrodite and the Duke (2022), Publishers Weekly said, "the melodramatic appeal of their romance is marred slightly by inconsistent pacing and some awkward language, but readers will easily fall in love with the protagonists". Christie Ridgway in a review for Bookpage wrote, "The characters' somewhat formal voices lend a verisimilitude that balances the enjoyable escape of McAvoy's Regency world of balls, gowns and romance". Booklist also reviewed Aphrodite and the Duke.

Verity and the Forbidden Suitor, the second novel in the Du Bells series, was published in 2023. Publishers Weekly wrote, "The leads are well suited and the series conceit—which diversifies the upper echelons of Regency society sans historical comment or justification—continues to make for memorable, Black-centered love stories". Library Journal gave it a starred review, writing that the book "avoids easy answers to the mental and societal problems her protagonists face from within and without. Supporting characters frequently steal scenes and imbue humor into the couple’s emotional journey".

== Selected works ==
=== Du Bells series ===
- Aphrodite and the Duke. Dell, 2022. ISBN 978-0-593-50004-0.
- Verity and the Forbidden Suitor. Dell. 2023. ISBN 978-0-593-50006-4.

=== Ruthless People series ===
- Ruthless People. The Writers Coffee Workshop. 2014. ISBN 9781612133195.
- The Untouchables. 2015. ISBN 9781507526743.
- American Savages. 2015. ISBN 9781508770237.
- A Bloody Kingdom. 2017. ISBN 9781542995757.

=== Children of Vice series ===
- Children of Vice. 2017. ISBN 9781546492887.
- Children of Ambition. 2018. ISBN 9781981520411.
- Children of Redemption. 2018. ISBN 9781985821293.
- Vicious Minds Part 1. 2020. ISBN 9798645641856.
- Vicious Minds Part 2. 2020. ISBN 9798645650124.
- Vicious Minds Part 3. 2020. ISBN 9798555974020.

=== The Prince's Bride series ===
- The Prince's Bride Part 1. 2020. ISBN 9798667116363.
- The Prince's Bride Part 2. 2020. ISBN 9798560733889.
- The Prince's Bride: Beginning Forever. 2021. ISBN 9798577652449.
