= Chris Baillie =

Chris Baillie may refer to:

- Chris Baillie (politician) (born 1961 or 1962)
- Chris Baillie (hurdler) (born 1981)
