= Thomas Homer-Dixon =

Canadian political scientist (born 1956)

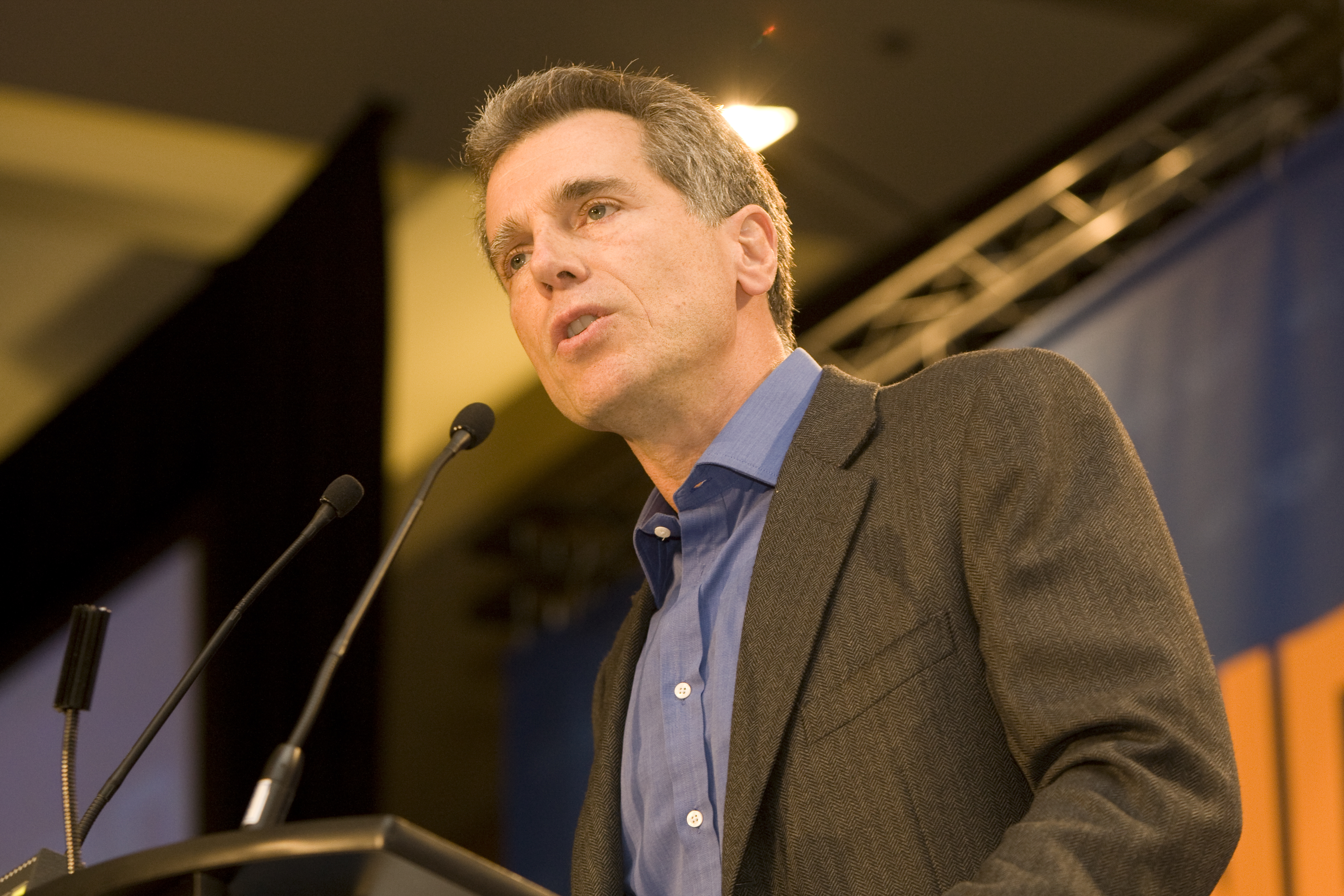
- Homer-Dixon in 2007
- Born: British Columbia
- Education: Carleton University (BA); Massachusetts Institute of Technology (PhD)
- Website: https://homerdixon.com/

Thomas Homer-Dixon (born 1956) is a Canadian political scientist and author who researches threats to global security. He is the founder and Executive Director of the Cascade Institute at Royal Roads University in Victoria, British Columbia. He is the author of seven books, the most recent being Commanding Hope: The Power We Have to Renew a World in Peril (2020).

== Early life and education ==
Homer-Dixon was born and raised in a rural area outside Victoria, British Columbia. In his late teens and early twenties, he worked on oil rigs and in forestry.

=== Higher education ===
In 1980, he received a B.A. in political science from Carleton University in Ottawa. He then established the Canadian Student Pugwash organization, a forum for discussion of the relationships between science, ethics, and public policy. He completed his Ph.D. in political science at the Massachusetts Institute of Technology in 1989, specializing in international relations and conflict theory under the supervision of Hayward Alker.

== Academic career ==
Homer-Dixon began his academic career at the University of Toronto in 1990 where he led several research projects examining links between environmental stress and violence in poor countries. In 1993, he joined the faculty of University College and the Department of Political Science, progressing to full professor status in 2006. Meanwhile, he was director of the Peace and Conflict Studies Program, University College, before he moved on to be the Director of the Trudeau Centre for Peace and Conflict Studies until 2007.

In 2008, Homer-Dixon moved to the University of Waterloo, Ontario, to assume the role as the Centre for International Governance Innovation Chair of Global Systems at the newly created Balsillie School of International Affairs.

He was the founding director of the Waterloo Institute for Complexity and Innovation at the University of Waterloo between 2009 and 2014.

In 2019, Homer-Dixon was appointed a University Research Chair at the University of Waterloo in Waterloo, Ontario. In 2020, he became the executive director of the Cascade Institute at Royal Roads University.

== Academic work ==
=== Environmental stress and violent conflict ===
In the early 1990s, at the University of Toronto, Homer-Dixon led a team of researchers that pioneered study of the links between environmental stress and violent conflict. Two of his articles in the Harvard journal International Security identified underlying mechanisms by which scarcities of natural resources like cropland and fresh water could contribute to insurgency, ethnic clashes, terrorism, and genocide in poor countries. This research culminated in his book Environment, Scarcity, and Violence, which won the Caldwell Prize of the American Political Science Association.

=== Social innovation and the "ingenuity gap" ===
In the mid-1990s, Homer-Dixon worked on the determinants of successful social innovation in response to key threats and challenges like climate change. He coined the term "ingenuity gap," and his work resulted in the book The Ingenuity Gap. The book was published in six countries and won the 2001 Governor General's Award for English-language non-fiction in Canada.

=== Societal breakdown and renewal ===
In the 2000s, Homer-Dixon studied the links between major crisis and societal renewal—a phenomenon he called "catagenesis." Using the Roman Empire as a case study, he focused especially on the relationship between energy inputs, social complexity, and social crisis. This work led to the book The Upside of Down which won the 2007 National Business Book Award. The book introduced the concept of "synchronous failure," which was further developed in a co-authored 2015 article in Ecology and Society.

=== The role of hope ===
After 2010, Homer-Dixon's work became more prescriptive, focusing on how humanity might address its crises, and in particular on the essential role of the emotion hope. These ideas were brought together in the book Commanding Hope: The Power We Have to Renew a World in Peril.

== Views ==
In an opinion piece published in The New York Times in April 2013, Homer-Dixon stated that Alberta's oil sands industry "is undermining Canadian democracy" and that "tar sands influence reaches deep into the federal cabinet." Homer-Dixon also said that "Canada is beginning to exhibit the economic and political characteristics of a petro-state" and that the oil sands industry "is relentlessly twisting our society into something we don't like."

In 2022, Homer-Dixon expressed the belief that the United States could be ruled by a right-wing dictator before 2030.

In 2026, Homer-Dixon co-wrote a column in The Globe and Mail in which he and his co-author argued that Canada should prepare for U.S. President Donald Trump to use military force against Canada.

== Bibliography ==
- Environmental Scarcity and Global Security. New York: Foreign Policy Association. 1993. ISBN 0-87124-152-8.
- Population and Conflict. Liège: International Union for the Scientific Study of Population. 1994. ISBN 2-87108-032-1.
- Environment, Scarcity, and Violence. Princeton: Princeton University Press. 1999. ISBN 0-691-02794-3.
- The Ingenuity Gap. New York: Knopf. 2000. ISBN 0-375-40186-5.
- The Upside of Down: Catastrophe, Creativity, and the Renewal of Civilization. Toronto: Knopf. 2006. ISBN 0-676-97722-7.
- Carbon Shift: How Peak Oil and the Climate Crisis Will Change Canada (and Our Lives). Toronto: Vintage Canada. 2010. ISBN 978-0-307-35719-9.
- Commanding Hope: The Power We Have to Renew a World in Peril. Toronto: Knopf Canada. 2020. ISBN 978-0307363169.

== See also ==
- List of University of Waterloo people
