= Chris Bailey (author) =

Canadian writer

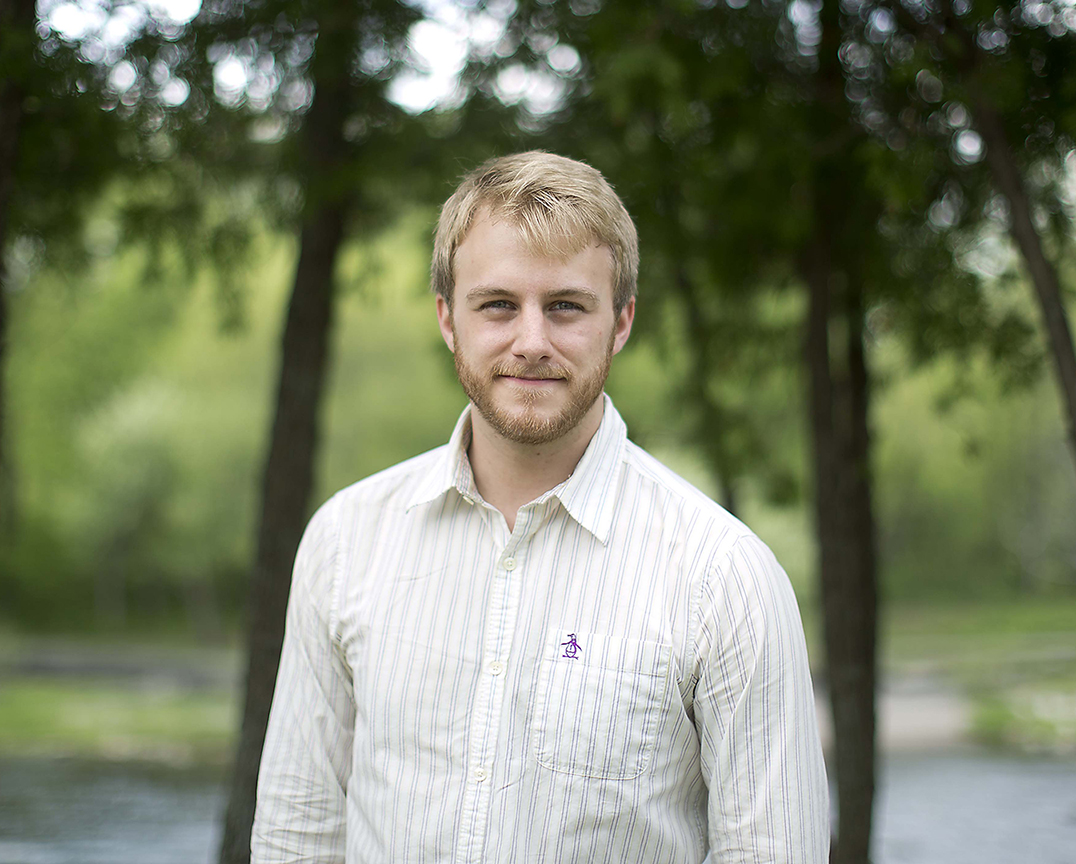
- Born: 1989 (age 36–37); Red Deer, Alberta, Canada
- Education: Carleton University
- Occupations: Author, consultant
- Years active: 2013–present
- Website: alifeofproductivity.com

Chris Bailey (born 1989) is a Canadian writer and productivity consultant, and the author of The Productivity Project (2016), Hyperfocus (2018) and How to Calm Your Mind (2022).

== Personal life and education ==
Bailey was born in Red Deer, Alberta, and raised in Belleville, Ontario, Canada. He first became interested in productivity in high school, after reading David Allen's 2001 book Getting Things Done. He moved to Ottawa, Ontario, to attend Carleton University, graduating from the Sprott School of Business in 2013. Bailey lives in Kingston, Ontario, with his wife, Ardyn Nordstrom.

== Career ==
=== The Productivity Project ===
After college, Chris Bailey took a one-year sabbatical to research and conduct experiments in productivity on himself, documenting his experiences on his blog, A Year of Productivity (later renamed A Life of Productivity). He began the year-long project in May 2013, testing new and old productivity theories through experiments including living in seclusion for 10 days; limiting his smartphone use to an hour a day for 3 months; getting up at 5:30 am each morning; and experimenting with varying-length workweeks, between 20 hours and 90 hours, to find the optimal workweek length. He watched 296 TED talks (roughly 70 hours) in 7 days, and then compiled lists on his blog of 100 things he learned, the 7 characteristics of highly effective TED speakers, and 10 TED talks one can watch in order to be more productive.

Insights and strategies learned from these experiments, as well as from interviews with other experts in the field, were compiled into his 2016 book The Productivity Project, a Canadian nonfiction bestseller and the top-selling nonfiction audio book on Audible.com for the week ending July 15, 2016. The Globe and Mail named The Productivity Project one of the 10 best management and business books of 2016, and Fortune magazine named it one of three best business books of the year. The Mandarin Chinese translation was a bestselling Business Finance book in Taiwan.

The book's main principles involve learning to manage one's time, energy and attention. Among other productivity tactics, Bailey discusses the benefits of finding one's Biological Prime Time (the unique time of day when a person has their highest energy level) and dedicating that time to performing important tasks, through the creation of a daily to-do list limited to the three most important things that need to be accomplished that day. In addition to a "to-do" list, Bailey recommends keeping a "done" list of one's largest accomplishments, adding to it each week and reviewing it every Sunday to gain inspiration for the week ahead. He also advises sitting alone in a room for 15 minutes, allowing the brain to wander, and taking notes with a pen and paper, a concept adapted from cognitive neuroscientist Daniel Levitin.

Bailey has also advised that to be more efficient while watching television, one could simultaneously perform mindless everyday chores around the house, such as doing laundry, working out, or doing the dishes. He suggests delaying coffee consumption until before embarking on an important task in order to fully utilize the resulting energy boost, rather than drinking coffee automatically at the same time each day. He has stated that in the workplace, employers should focus on employees' accomplishments instead of how late they stay at work, to emphasize quality over quantity. Regarding work emails, Bailey advises to keep them brief (three sentences or less), to send them early in the work day, and to wait to reply to gain more insight and give yourself time to put together a succinct and effective message.

At TEDxLiverpool in 2016, he delivered the talk "A More Human Approach to Productivity", encouraging people to set three intentions each day, and focus on achieving those goals.

=== Hyperfocus ===
Bailey's second book, Hyperfocus, was published by Viking Press on August 28, 2018. For the book, he conducted a yearlong research experiment to determine how people can be as productive as possible each day, in a world filled with nonstop technology distractions. The book offers advice on maintaining and controlling focus, determining priorities, and minimizing interruptions in order to increase productivity. It is split into two sections: the first on hyperfocus, or being productive by devoting all your attention to completing a task; and the second on scatterfocus, where you allow your mind to wander, which supports creativity and can help to recharge. Bailey writes that you can increase focus and improve attention span by reducing your time with online access, letting your attention wander, and focusing on building a quality attention span. He recommends methods such as keeping emails brief (five sentences or less; if a response requires more, he makes a phone call), responding to emails in batches, and turning off email notifications. He recommends meditating daily to increase productivity, and setting intentions daily, weekly, and yearly.

== Bibliography ==
=== Book ===
- The Productivity Project: Accomplishing More by Managing Your Time, Attention, and Energy (Crown Business / Penguin Random House, January 5, 2016, ISBN 978-1101904053)
- Hyperfocus: How to Be More Productive in a World of Distraction (Viking Press, August 28, 2018, ISBN 978-0525522232)
- How to calm your mind : finding presence and productivity in anxious times (Penguin Life, December, 27, 2022, ISBN 978-0593298510)

=== Articles ===
- "10 Lessons I Learned from a Year of Productivity Experiments" – Lifehacker, June 3, 2014
- "Slacker success: Why working 20 hours a week is more effective than 90" – National Post, December 31, 2015
- "How Keeping Track of These Two Things Totally Transformed My Productivity" – Fast Company, January 6, 2016
- "5 Research-Based Strategies for Overcoming Procrastination" – Harvard Business Review, October 4, 2017
- "Distracted? Work Harder!" – The New York Times, August 25, 2018
- "4 Strategies for Overcoming Distraction" – Harvard Business Review, August 30, 2018
- "Time management isn’t the problem – our attention span is" – The Globe and Mail, November 2, 2018
