= Holmes (surname) =

- Language: English

Origin
- Languages: English, Scottish Gaelic
- Meaning: Various; in Highland Gaelic contexts, anglicisation of Mac Thomáis / Mac Thámhais

Other names
- Variant forms: Holme, MacHomais, MacTamhais
- Anglicisations: Scottish Gaelic MacGilleTamhais, MacTamhais, MacHomais

Holmes is an English-language surname with several origins.

The name can be a variant of the surname Holme. This surname has several etymological origins: it can be derived from a name for someone who lived next to a holly tree, from the Middle English holm; it can also be derived from the Old English holm and Old Norse holmr. Another probable origin of Holmes is from a placename near Dundonald, or else a place located in the barony of Inchestuir.

The surname is also sometimes an Anglicised form of the Gaelic Mac Thomáis; similarly, Holmes can also be a variant of Cavish, derived as an Anglicised form of Mac Thámhais. In the western Highland Gaelic dialect of Knapdale and Argyll, Holmes derives specifically from MacGilleTamhais, transitioning through MacTamhais and MacHomais before anglicising to Holmes — making it an associated family name of Clan MacTavish. These Highland Holmes families are genealogically distinct from Lowland Holmes families, which have separate etymological origins.

== People ==
=== A ===
- A.J. Holmes Jr. (born 2003), American football player
- Alan Holmes, Welsh musician and record producer
- Albert Holmes (footballer, born 1885) (1885–?), English footballer
- Albert Holmes (footballer born 1942), English-born footballer
- Alex Holmes (born 1981), American football player
- Alexander Holmes, crewman of the ship William Brown, convicted of manslaughter in 1841 for forcing passengers out of an overloaded lifeboat
- Alexander Holmes, pseudonym of Hans Habe
- Alfred Holmes (1931–1994), sergeant of the Gibraltar Regiment
- Alfred Holmes (composer) (1837–1876), violinist and composer
- Alice Waring Holmes (1872 – 1939), dentist and suffragette
- Alvin Holmes (1939–2020), American politician
- Andre Holmes (born 1988), American football player; brother of Jason Holmes (see below)
- Andrew Holmes (disambiguation), multiple people
- Anthony Holmes, British author and businessman
- Anthony D. Holmes (born 1945), Australian plastic and reconstructive surgeon
- J. Anthony Holmes, American diplomat
- Arthur Holmes (1890–1965), British geologist
- Arthur F. Holmes (1924–2011), American professor of philosophy
- Ashton Holmes (born 1978), American film and TV actor
- Augusta Holmès (1847–1903), French composer

=== B ===
- Barry Holmes (1928–1949), Anglo-Argentinian rugby union player
- Ben Holmes (director) (1890–1943), American film director
- Benjamin Holmes (disambiguation)
- Besby Holmes (1917–2006), American World War II fighter pilot
- Bill Holmes (disambiguation)
- Brad Holmes (born 1979), American football executive
- Brenda Swann Holmes, American research chemist
- Bruce Holmes (born 1965), American football player
- Burton Holmes (1870–1958), American traveller, photographer and filmmaker

=== C ===
- Catherine Holmes, Australian judge
- Charles Holmes (disambiguation)
- Charlie Holmes (1910–1985), American jazz saxophonist
- Chris Holmes (disambiguation)
- Christian Holmes (born 1997), American football player
- Christian R. Holmes Jr. (1896–1944), decorated American soldier and zoo owner
- Chuck Holmes (ice hockey) (1934–2019), Canadian ice hockey player
- Clara H. Holmes (1838–1927), American writer
- Clarence Holmes (born 1968), also known as Ready Rock C, American musician
- Clay Holmes (born 1993), American baseball player
- Clent Holmes (1917–?), American guitarist

=== D ===
- Daniel Henry Holmes (1816–1898), American businessman
- Danny Holmes (born 1989), English footballer
- Darnay Holmes (born 1998), American football player
- Darren Holmes (baseball) (born 1966), American baseball player and coach
- Dave Holmes (actor) (born 1971), American television personality
- Dave Holmes (sportscaster), American sportscaster
- David Holmes (disambiguation)
- Donald Grahame Holmes, Australian electrical engineer
- Dorothy Evans Holmes (born 1943), American psychoanalytic thinker, psychoanalyst and psychotherapist

=== E ===
- Eamonn Holmes (born 1959), Northern Irish journalist and broadcaster
- Earl Holmes, American football player
- Edmond Holmes (1850–1936), English writer and poet
- Edward Morell Holmes (1843–1930), British botanist
- Edwin Holmes (disambiguation)
- Elizabeth Holmes, American businesswoman, founder of Theranos
- Emma Holmes, American Civil War diarist
- Eric Holmes (racing driver) (born 1974), American race car driver
- Eric Holmes (video game designer), Scottish writer, creative director and videogame designer
- Eric Leighton Holmes, British chemist
- Ernest Holmes (1887–1960), founder of the movement known as Religious Science, also known as "Science of Mind," a part of the New Thought Movement
- Ernie Holmes (1948–2008), American football player
- Errol Holmes (1905–1960), English cricketer

=== F ===
- Frank Holmes (disambiguation)
- Fred Holmes (1878–1956), American baseball player
- Frederic L. Holmes (1932–2003), American historian of science
- Frederick Hale Holmes (1812–1875), British professor of chemistry, pioneer of electric lighting and inventor
- Frederick William Holmes (1889–1969), English soldier awarded the Victoria Cross

=== G ===
- Gabriel Holmes (1769–1829), American politician
- Gavrielle Holmes, American politician
- Genta Hawkins Holmes (born 1940), American foreign service officer
- George Holmes (archivist) (1662–1749), English archivist and editor of Thomas Rymer's Fœdera
- George Holmes (historian) (1927–2009), Chichele Professor of Medieval History Emeritus at the University of Oxford
- George Frederick Holmes (1829–1897), American educator
- George M. Holmes (1929–2009), U.S. politician
- Gordon Morgan Holmes (1876–1965), British neurologist
- Grant Holmes (born 1996), American baseball player
- Greg Holmes (cricketer) (born 1993), Welsh cricketer
- Greg Holmes (rugby union) (born 1983), Australian rugby union player
- Greg Holmes (tennis) (born 1963), American former tennis player

=== H ===
- Hamilton E. Holmes (1941–1995), American physician who helped desegregate the University of Georgia as one of the first two African-American students
- Hap Holmes (1889–1940), Canadian ice hockey goalie
- Harold Holmes (disambiguation)
- Harry Holmes (disambiguation)
- Harvey Holmes (1873–1948), American college football player and coach of football, baseball and track
- Helen Freudenberger Holmes (1915–1997), American journalist, historian, teacher, politician and Women's Army Corps officer
- Helen Holmes (actress) (1893–1950), American actress
- Henry Holmes (disambiguation)
- H. H. Holmes (1861–1896), American con man, killer and bigamist
- Howdy Holmes (born 1949), American racing driver
- Hugh Holmes (1840–1916), Irish politician

=== I ===
- Ian Holmes (disambiguation)

=== J ===
- J. Anthony Holmes, American diplomat
- Jacob Holmes (born 1983), Australian basketball player
- Jackie Holmes (1920–1995), American Formula One driver
- Jake Holmes (born 1939), American folk-pop singer/songwriter
- Jalyn Holmes (born 1996), American football player
- James Holmes (disambiguation)
- Jason Holmes (born 1989), American Australian rules footballer; brother of Andre Holmes
- Jennie Florella Holmes (1842–1892), American suffragist and temperance activist
- Jennifer Holmes (disambiguation), multiple people
- Jerome Holmes (born 1961), American federal judge
- Jessica Holmes (born 1973), Canadian comedian and actor
- Jimmy Holmes (born 1953), Irish former professional footballer
- Joan Holmes (born 1935), founding president of The Hunger Project
- Joe Holmes (born 1963), American heavy metal guitarist
- Joe Holmes (singer) (1906–1978), Irish singer
- Joel Holmes (1821–1872), English soldier awarded the Victoria Cross
- John Holmes (disambiguation)
- Jon Holmes (born 1973), British comedy writer and broadcaster
- Jonathan Holmes (disambiguation)
- Joseph Holmes (disambiguation)
- Josh Holmes (boxer) (born 1995), English boxer
- Josh Holmes (rugby union) (born 1987), Australian rugby union player
- Josh Holmes (video game designer) (born 1973), Canadian game producer and video game designer
- Julie Lynn Holmes, American former figure skater

=== K ===
- Katie Holmes (born 1978), American actress
- Keith Holmes (palaeobotanist) (born 1933), Australian palaeobotanist
- Keith Holmes (boxer) (born 1969), American boxer
- Kelda Holmes (born 1970), English actress
- Kelly Holmes (born 1970), British middle-distance athlete
- Kenneth Holmes (1934–2021), British scientist
- King K. Holmes (born 1937), American physician, medical researcher, and medical school professor
- Kris Holmes (born 1950), American type designer

=== L ===
- Larry Holmes (born 1949), American boxer
- La'Shanda Holmes (born 1985), American Coast Guard helicopter pilot
- Laura Holmes (1932–2016), American NSA career cryptanalyst
- Lee Holmes (born 1987), English footballer
- Len Holmes, Australian rugby league footballer
- Leslie Holmes (1901–1983), Canadian opera baritone and voice teacher
- Leslie Holmes (variety entertainer) (1901–1960), English variety entertainer, pianist, drummer, bandleader, songwriter, and actor.
- Linda Holmes (born 1959), American politician
- Lindsey Holmes (born 1973), American politician
- Lizzie Holmes (1850–1926), American anarchist and editor
- London Holmes (born 1991), known professionally as "London on da Track", American record producer, rapper, and songwriter.
- Louis Holmes, American football player
- Lucy Holmes (born 1979), British-born Australian TV presenter and performer

=== M ===
- Mackenzie Holmes (born 2000), American basketball player
- Margaret Holmes (1909–2009), Australian peace activist
- Margaret Holmes (ecumenist) (1886–1981), Australian refugee resettlement officer
- Margaret Flagg Holmes (1886–1976), co-founder of Alpha Kappa Alpha sorority
- Mark Holmes (disambiguation)
- Martha Holmes (photographer) (1923–2006), American photographer
- Martha Holmes (broadcaster), British marine biologist, TV journalist and producer
- Mary Holmes (disambiguation)
- Matt Holmes (actor) (born 1976), Australian actor
- Matthew Holmes (engineer) (1844–1903), chief mechanical engineer of the North British Railway
- Maurice Holmes (cricketer), English cricketer and barrister
- Michael Holmes (disambiguation)
- Michelle Holmes (born 1967), English actress
- Mike Holmes (born 1963), Canadian professional contractor and host of Holmes on Homes
- Mike Holmes (born 1948), British electrical engineer
- Mike Holmes (wide receiver) (born 1950), Canadian Football League receiver

=== N ===
- Nancy Holmes (born 1959), Canadian poet and educator
- Nick Holmes (disambiguation)

=== O ===
- Obadiah Holmes (1610–1682), early Rhode Island settler and Baptist minister
- Oliver Holmes (rugby league) (born 1992), Canadian rugby player
- Oliver Wendell Holmes Sr. (1809–1894), poet and essayist
- Oliver Wendell Holmes Jr. (1841–1935), justice of the Supreme Court of the United States
- Oscar Holmes (1916–2001), first African-American Naval Aviator and air traffic controller

=== P ===
- Paul Holmes (disambiguation)
- Pehr G. Holmes (1881–1952), US Representative from Massachusetts
- Percy Holmes (1886–1971), English cricketer
- Pete or Peter Holmes (disambiguation)
- Philip Holmes (born 1945), American engineering professor
- Phillips Holmes (1907–1942), American film actor
- Portia Holmes Shields, American academic administrator
- Priest Holmes (born 1973), American football player

=== R ===
- Ray Holmes (1914–2005), British Second World War fighter pilot
- Rand Holmes, (1942–2002), Canadian comic artist
- Reggie Holmes (born 1987), American basketball player
- Renita Holmes, American housing activist
- Richard Holmes (disambiguation)
- Richaun Holmes (born 1993), American basketball player
- Robert Holmes (disambiguation)
- Rupert Holmes, British-American composer, singer-songwriter and dramatist
- Ruth Bradley Holmes (1924–2021), American linguist, educator, and polyglot

=== S ===
- Samuel Jackson Holmes (1868–1964), American zoologist
- Santonio Holmes (born 1984), American footballer and Super Bowl XLIII MVP
- Sean Holmes (theatre director), British theatre director and former Artistic Director of Lyric Hammersmith
- Sharon Holmes (1950–2015), Canadian artist (née Sharon Christian)
- Simon Hugh Holmes (1831–1919), Nova Scotia politician, publisher and lawyer
- Stanley Holmes, 1st Baron Dovercourt (1878–1961), British politician
- Steve Holmes (actor) (born 1961), Romanian-born German pornographic film actor
- Susan Holmes (disambiguation)

=== T ===
- Taylor Holmes (1878–1959), American stage actor
- Terry Holmes (born 1957), former Welsh international rugby union player
- Thalia Holmes (born 2004), English chess player
- Theophilus H. Holmes (1804–1880), Confederate Civil War lieutenant general
- Thomas Holmes (disambiguation)
- Tim Holmes (artist) (born 1955), American sculptor, filmmaker and musician
- Tim Holmes (actor) (born 1967), American actor
- Timothy Holmes (1825–1907), English surgeon
- Tina Holmes (born 1973), American television and film actress
- Tom Holmes (born 1979), contemporary American artist
- Tom Holmes (British politician) (born 1930s), current chairman of the far-right British political party the National Front
- Tommy Holmes (1917–2008), American baseball player

=== V ===
- Valentine Holmes (born 1995), Australian-born American football player and rugby player
- Valerie Susan Holmes (born 1946), English beauty pageant contestant
- Victoria Holmes, English novelist

=== W ===
- William Holmes (Australian general) (1862–1917), Australian Army Major General during World War I
- William Edgar Holmes (1895–1918), English soldier and VC recipient
- William Holmes (1779–1851), British politician
- William Holmes (British Army officer, born 1892) (1892–1969), British general during the Second World War
- William Henry Holmes (1846–1933), American anthropologist, archaeologist, geologist and museum director
- William Henry Holmes (musician) (1812–1885), English musician
- William Norman Holmes (1896–1981), British air gunner

== Fictional characters ==
- Enola Holmes (character), sister of Sherlock Holmes created by Nancy Springer
- Hemlock Holmes, a character from UPA's Dick Tracy cartoon
- Mycroft Holmes, brother of Sherlock Holmes
- Sherlock Holmes, fictional detective

== See also ==
- Justice Holmes (disambiguation)
- Safiya Henderson-Holmes (1950–2001), African-American poet
- Holmes à Court, a surname
- Derek St. Holmes (born 1953), American musician
- Holm (surname)
