= Holm (surname) =

Holm is a surname which originated in Scandinavia and Britain. Holm is derived from the Old Norse word holmr meaning a small island. Also Danish, Swedish and Norwegian.

== Geographical distribution ==
As of 2014, 24.7% of all known bearers of the surname Holm were residents of the United States (frequency 1:19,643), 21.0% of Denmark (1:360), 19.7% of Sweden (1:671), 10.0% of Norway (1:691), 6.5% of Germany (1:16,505), 4.0% of Finland (1:1,837), 3.8% of Ghana (1:9,477), 2.4% of Canada (1:20,196), 1.3% of Australia (1:24,284) and 1.2% of South Africa (1:58,477).

In Denmark, the frequency of the surname was higher than national average (1:360) in the following regions:

1. Capital Region of Denmark (1:321)
2. Region of Southern Denmark (1:333)

In Sweden, the frequency of the surname was higher than national average (1:671) in the following counties:

1. Örebro County (1:443)
2. Gävleborg County (1:445)
3. Västmanland County (1:496)
4. Kalmar County (1:515)
5. Dalarna County (1:559)
6. Jönköping County (1:606)
7. Östergötland County (1:613)
8. Uppsala County (1:618)
9. Södermanland County (1:649)

In Norway, the frequency of the surname was higher than national average (1:691) in the following regions:

1. Trøndelag (1:559)
2. Eastern Norway (1:559)

In Finland, the frequency of the surname was higher than national average (1:1,837) in the following regions:

1. Ostrobothnia (1:263)
2. Central Ostrobothnia (1:836)
3. Åland (1:950)
4. Central Finland (1:1,125)
5. Uusimaa (1:1,444)
6. Southwest Finland (1:1,649)

== People ==
- Anders Holm, American comedy writer
- Andreas Holm (politician) (1906–2003), Norwegian politician for the Centre Party
- Andrew Holm (fl. 1882–1883), Scottish international football player
- Anne Holm (1922–1998), Danish journalist and children's writer
- Asbjørn Holm (1921–2001), Norwegian politician for the Socialist People's Party
- Askil Holm, Norwegian singer and musician
- Astrid Holm (1893–1961), Danish actress
- Astrid Valborg Holm (1876–1937), Danish painter
- Barbara Holm (born 1948), American politician
- Bill Holm (poet) (1943–2009), American poet, essayist, memoirist, and musician
- Bill Holm (art historian), American artist, author and art historian
- Billy Holm (1912–1977), American Major League Baseball catcher
- Børge Holm (1910–1971), Danish boxer who competed in the 1936 Summer Olympics
- Brian Holm, retired Danish professional rider in road bicycle racing
- Celeste Holm, American stage, film, and television actress
- Christian Holm (Scouting)
- Chr. L. Holm (1892–1981), Norwegian politician for the Conservative Party
- Claus Holm (1918–1996) German film actor
- Christian Holm (Norwegian politician) (1783–1855), Norwegian politician
- Christian Holm (Swedish politician), Swedish politician of the Moderate Party
- Christian Hintze Holm Norwegian politician for the Socialist Left Party
- D. K. Holm, movie reviewer, Internet columnist, radio broadcaster, and author
- Dallas Holm, singer-songwriter of Christian music,
- Daniel Fredheim Holm, Norwegian striker in the football club Aalborg
- Dick Holm, American CIA Operations Officer
- Dorthe Holm, Danish curler
- Einar Knut Holm, Norwegian politician for the Liberal Party
- Eleanor Holm (1913–2004), American swimmer
- Elmer Holm, American football coach at Washburn University in Topeka, Kansas
- Emil Holm (sport shooter) (1877–1968), Finnish sport shooter
- Emil Holm (footballer) (born 2000), Swedish footballer
- Erlend Holm, Norwegian football defender
- Espen Beranek Holm, Norwegian pop artist and comedian
- Esther Aberdeen Holm (1904–1984), American geologist
- Fred Lonberg-Holm, American cello player
- Georg Hólm, bassist of the Icelandic post-rock band Sigur Rós
- Gretelise Holm (born 1948), Danish journalist, non-fiction and fiction writer
- Gustav Frederik Holm (1849–1940), Danish naval officer and Arctic explorer
- Hanya Holm (1893–1992), German-born dancer, choreographer, and dance educator
- Harry Holm (1902–1987), Danish gymnast who competed in the 1920 Summer Olympics
- Håvard Holm, Norwegian civil servant
- Henrik Holm (actor), Norwegian actor and model
- Henrik Holm, Swedish former tennis player
- Holly Holm, former UFC bantamweight champion, kickboxer and retired welterweight boxing champion
- Ian Holm (1931–2020), English actor known for his stage work and for many film roles
- Janet Holm (1923–2018), New Zealand environmental activist and historian
- Jeanne M. Holm (NASA), American scientist and Chief Knowledge Architect at Jet Propulsion Laboratory
- Jeanne M. Holm, United States Air Force Major General and Women's rights activist.
- Jens Holm, Swedish Member of the European Parliament for the Left Party
- Jim Holm (born 1945), American politician
- John Cecil Holm, (1904–1981) American dramatist
- John Holm, Canadian politician
- John A. Holm, linguist
- John Holms (1830–1891), Scottish businessman and Liberal politician
- Kai Holm (1896–1985), Danish film actor
- Karl Eric Holm (1919–2016), Swedish Army lieutenant general
- Knud Holm (1887–1972), Danish gymnast who competed in the 1906 Summer Olympics and 1908 Summer Olympics
- Kris Holm, Canadian best known for riding a unicycle in off-road conditions
- Lasse Holm, Swedish composer, lyricist and singer
- Leif-Erik Holm (born 1970), German politician
- Ludvig Holm (1858–1928), Danish violinist and composer
- Martin Holm (1976–2009), Swedish Muay Thai kickboxer and former WMC Muay Thai World Champion
- Melwin Lycke Holm (born 2004), Swedish high jumper
- Michael Holm, German singer, musician, songwriter and producer
- Mike Holm (1876–1952), Swedish-born American politician
- Ove Holm
- Peter Holm (disambiguation)
- Richard H. Holm, American inorganic chemist
- Richard Holm (tenor), (1912–1988), German operatic tenor
- Dick Holm, American CIA Operations Officer
- Rikke Holm (born 1972), Danish footballer
- Sejer Holm (born 1939), Danish chess player
- Skip Holm, American military pilot during the Vietnam War
- Soren Holm, prominent bioethicist and philosopher of medicine
- Staffan Valdemar Holm, Swedish theatre director
- Stefan Holm, Swedish high jumper
- Steve Holm, American Major League Baseball catcher
- Sverre Holm (1931–2005), Norwegian stage and film actor
- Theo Holm (1854–1932), Danish-American systematic botanist
- Thomas Holm (disambiguation)
- Tony Holm, American professional football player
- Tore Holm (1896–1977), Swedish sailor who competed in the 1920, 1928, 1932, 1936 and in the 1948 Summer Olympics.
- Ulf Holm, Swedish Green Party politician, member of the Riksdag
- Valsø Holm (1906–1987), Danish film actor
- Vilhelm Christian Holm (1820–1886), Danish composer
- Virginia Paul Holm, American politician
- Wattie Holm (1901–1950), American Major League Baseball player
- Yngve Holm (1895–1943), Swedish sailor who competed in the 1920 Summer Olympics

== See also ==
- Holmes (surname)
