= Josh Holmes =

Josh or Joshua Holmes may refer to:

- Josh Holmes (rugby union) (born 1987), Australian rugby union player
- Josh Holmes (video game designer) (born 1973), Canadian game producer and video game designer
- Josh Holmes (boxer) (born 1995), English boxer
