= Chuck Holmes =

Chuck Holmes may refer to:

- Chuck Holmes (ice hockey)
- Chuck Holmes (entrepreneur)

== See also ==
- Charles Holmes (disambiguation)
