= Donald Holmes =

Donald or Don Holmes may refer to:

- Donald F. Holmes (1910–1980), American inventor
- Donald Grahame Holmes, Australian electrical engineer
- Donald Don Holmes (born 1959), Australian rules football player
- Donald Don Holmes (American football) (born 1961), American former National Football League player and college coach
