= Frank Holmes =

Frank Holmes may refer to:

- Sir Frank Holmes (economist) (1924–2011), New Zealand economist
- Frank Holmes (geologist) (1874–1947), British geologist
- Frank E. Holmes, chief executive and chief investment officer at U.S. Global Investors
- Frank Holmes (athlete) (1885–1980), American track and field athlete
- Frank J. Holmes, American painter
- Frank Holmes (filmmaker) (1908–1990), producer and director of Seaport of the Prairies
- Frank Holmes (footballer) (1900–1989), Australian rules footballer
- Frankie Holmes, a co-host and subject of the documentary television series Dopesick Nation
