= William Holms =

William Holms may refer to:

- William Holms (politician)
- William Holms (engineer)

== See also ==
- William Holmes (disambiguation)
