= Keith Holmes =

Keith Holmes may refer to:

- Keith Holmes (boxer) (born 1969), American boxer
- Keith Holmes (palaeobotanist) (born 1933), Australian palaeobotanist
