= Benjamin Holmes =

Benjamin Holmes may refer to:

- Benjamin Holmes (American politician) (1846–1914), Democratic Mayor of Kansas City
- Benjamin Holmes (Canadian politician) (1794–1865), Lower Canada businessman
- Ben Holmes (baseball) (1858–1949), American baseball player
- Ben Holmes (director) (1890–1943), American film director
- Ben Holmes (gridiron football) (born 1994), American football quarterback
- Benjamin Holmes (death in absentia) (born 1952)
- Ben Wetzler (Benjamin Holmes-Wetzler, born 1991), American professional baseball pitcher for the Miami Marlins
