= Jamie Holmes =

Jamie Holmes may refer to:

- Jamie Holmes (author) (born 1980) American author
- Jamie Holmes (cricketer) (born 1992), Irish cricketer
- Jamie Holmes (soccer) (born 1983), American professional soccer player
- Jamie Holmes (tennis) (born 1973), Australian professional tennis player
