= Thomas Holmes =

Thomas, Tom, or Tommy Holmes may refer to:

== Law and politics ==
- Thomas Holmes, 1st Baron Holmes (1699–1764), English Member of Parliament
- Thomas J. Holmes (c. 1819–1867), English born American politician; mayor of Portland, Oregon
- Tom Holmes (British politician) (1930–2016), British politician; chairman of the National Front
- Thomas Holmes (politician) (born 1949), American politician in South Dakota
- Tom Holmes (Texas politician) (1935–2023), American politician in Texas
- Tom Holmes (Alabama politician), American politician in Alabama

== Sports ==
- Tommy Holmes (footballer, born 1902) (1902-1997), English footballer, 138 appearances for Southport, see List of Bury F.C. players (1–24 appearances)
- Tommy Holmes (sportswriter) (1903–1975), American sports writer
- Tommy Holmes (1917–2008), American baseball player and manager
- Tom Holmes (rugby union) (born 1990), English rugby union player
- Tom Holmes (rugby league) (born 1996), English rugby league footballer
- Tom Holmes (footballer) (born 2000), English footballer

== Others ==
- Thomas A. Holmes (1804–1888), American surveyor, trader, and politician
- Thomas Holmes (mortician) (1817–1900), American mortician
- T. Rice Holmes (Thomas Rice Edward Holmes, 1855–1933), Irish scholar
- Thomas William Holmes (1898–1950), Canadian soldier; recipient of the Victoria Cross
- Tom Holmes (artist) (born 1979), American artist
- Thomas Holmes (executive), American business executive
- Thomas Holmes (missionary) (1846–1918), British police-court missionary, philanthropist and author

== See also ==
- Thomas Fraser-Holmes (born 1991), Australian swimmer
- Thomas Holme (disambiguation)
- Thomas Holm (disambiguation)
