= Andrew Holmes =

Andrew Holmes or Andy Holmes may refer to:

- Andrew Holmes (army officer) (died 1814), American army officer in the War of 1812
- Andrew Holmes, U.S. Army soldier convicted of having committed war crimes in Afghanistan, see Maywand District murders
- Andrew Holmes (activist), activist and local politician from Illinois
- Andrew Fernando Holmes (1797–1860), Canadian physician and academic
- Andrew Holmes, California National Guardsman and plaintiff in Holmes v. California National Guard
- Andrew Holmes (chemist) (born 1943), Australian scientist
- Andy Holmes (1959–2010), British rower
- Andy Holmes (footballer) (born 1969), English footballer
- Andrew O. Holmes (1906–1965), associate justice of the Tennessee Supreme Court
