= David Holmes =

David Holmes may refer to:

== Academics ==
- David L. Holmes (1932–2023), American academic and historian of Anglicanism
- Dave Holmes (researcher) (born 1967), Canadian researcher and academic

== Arts and entertainment ==
- David Holmes (musician) (born 1969), Northern Irish electronic musician and composer
- David Holmes, drummer and vocalist for Servant
- Dave Holmes (actor) (born 1971), American MTV VJ, television presenter, actor, and writer
- David Holmes (actor) (born 1981), British stuntman and actor in the Harry Potter films

== Politics and government ==
- David Holmes (politician) (1769–1832), last governor of the Mississippi Territory and the first governor of the State of Mississippi, congressman from Virginia
- David Holmes (trade unionist) (1843–1906), British trade unionist
- Ronald Holmes (David Ronald Holmes, 1913–1981), British colonial government official
- David Holmes (journalist) (1926–2014), BBC political editor
- David S. Holmes Jr. (1914–1994), American politician in Michigan,
- David Holmes (diplomat), United States Department of State official

== Sports ==
- Dave Holmes (American football) (1924–1999), American football player and coach
- Dave Holmes (sportscaster), American sportscaster
- David Holmes (businessman) (born 1935), Scottish businessperson, former Chairman of Rangers F.C.
- David L. Holmes (coach) (1887–1960), American college sports coach and athletics administrator
