= Thomas Holme (disambiguation) =

Thomas Holme was Surveyor General of Pennsylvania.

Thomas Holme may also refer to:

- Thomas Holme (MP), for City of York

== See also ==
- Thomas Holm (disambiguation)
- Thomas Holmes (disambiguation)
