= The Hunger Project =

Charitable organization

- Type: 501(c)(3) non-profit
- Industry: charitable organization
- Founded: 1977; 49 years ago
- Headquarters: New York, New York
- Key people: Rowlands Kaotcha, President and CEO; Jenna Recuber, Deputy CEO; Kosha Shiswawala, Chief Financial Officer; Joan Holmes, founder Werner Erhard, founder Robert W. Fuller, founder John Denver, founder
- Revenue: $23,882,732 USD (2023)
- Total assets: 19,288,851 United States dollar (2022)
- Number of employees: 118
- Website: www.thp.org

The Hunger Project (THP), founded in 1977 with the stated goal of ending world hunger in 25 years, is an organization committed to the sustainable end of world hunger. It has ongoing programs in Africa, Asia, and Latin America, where it implements programs aimed at mobilizing rural grassroots communities to achieve sustainable progress in health, education, nutrition, and family income. THP is a 501(c)(3) non-profit charitable organization incorporated in the state of California.

== History ==
The Project was founded in 1977 by Werner Erhard, who obtained support from figures such as Robert Works Fuller, former president of Oberlin College, and popular singer John Denver.

== Countries of operation ==
As of 2024, The Hunger Project is active in Africa (in Benin, Burkina Faso, Ethiopia, Ghana, Malawi, Mozambique, Senegal, Uganda, and Zambia); South Asia (Bangladesh and India), and Latin America (Mexico and Peru, where THP partners with the Center for Indigenous Peoples' Cultures of Peru or Chirapaq). It also had offices in Australia, Canada, Germany, Japan, the Netherlands, New Zealand, Sweden, Switzerland, and the United Kingdom, in addition to its global headquarters in the United States.

== Primary activities ==
In Africa, THP implements what it calls "the Epicenter Strategy", organizing clusters of 10 to 15 villages to construct community centers, partner with local government agencies and community-based organizations, and establish and manage their own programs for microfinance, improved agriculture, food-processing, income-generation, adult literacy, food security, and primary health-care (including the prevention of HIV/AIDS).

In India, THP facilitates the mobilization and training of elected women panchayat leaders. In Bangladesh, THP conducts trainings focused on gender issues and leadership for local leaders who then organize local meetings, lead workshops, and initiate campaigns against early marriage and dowry, malnutrition, maternal and child mortality, gender discrimination and inequality, illiteracy, and corruption. In Latin America, THP works with communities to overcome economic marginalization, particularly that of the indigenous women.

Dionne Warwick represented the charity on the US TV series The Celebrity Apprentice in Season 11 (which was aired in early 2011) and was fired before any money was made for donation. She left the show abruptly.

=== Methods and impact on food security in Uganda ===
In Uganda, The Hunger Project (THP) employs measures to facilitate the mobilization and growth of capital, as well as creating partnerships to alleviate food and health issues.

In 2009, THP-Uganda implemented the Microfinance program to improve food security and reduce poverty. The Microfinance program is a training, savings, and credit program; enabling the targeted poor who traditionally lack access to banking and related services to get small loans with the purpose of engaging in income-generating activities.

The program consists of two phases: Direct Credit and Rural Bank.

A Revolving Loan Fund (RLF) of about US$20,000 is allocated to a center, with the center's community electing its own people into the loan committee to manage the RLF. The funds go through a cycle of disbursement to the community, repayment of the loans from community members, and disbursement again. Through this process, the funds grow via accumulated interest.

After 4 to 5 years into the Direct Credit phase, if the microfinance operation in the community meets the level of criteria set by the government, the operation can apply to evolve into a savings and credit cooperative (Rural bank). All members of the community may deposit savings and access credit from the Rural Bank. The THP stops giving assistance to the Rural Bank when it becomes operationally self-sufficient in the next 2 years.

The Rural Bank is able to mobilise the community's wealth to create more wealth, as well as meeting its aim of providing the community with sustainable access to savings and credit facilities . In practice, the program saw success as THP's Iganga Epicenter Rural Bank in Uganda was named the "Best SACCO (Savings and Credit Cooperative) of 2009" by the District Commercial Office of the Ministry of Trade, Tourism and Industry.

THP's contributions to the whole operation include the gifting of RLF to start the whole process, payment of the Rural bank manager's salary for the first 2 years to secure full compliance, and assistance in the preparation of reports for the appropriate government office. The organization hopes to again achieve an end of world hunger by 2030. production is greatly constrained by pests and diseases, especially the African cassava mosaic virus. The partnership enabled the education of Ugandan farmers through grants of laptops with inbuilt training courses on group management, cassava multiplication, pests and diseases. Farmers were also taught on and given access to disease-free high-yielding cassava variety MH97/2961. This arrangement has improved household incomes and food security for a total of 1,455 partners in the last three years.

=== World Hunger Day ===
In 2011, The Hunger Project launched World Hunger Day as an international campaign to raise awareness about solutions to food insecurity. The event is observed annually on May 28.

=== Impact assessment ===
Innovations for Poverty Action, a nonprofit evaluation organization, partnered with THP to conduct a randomized controlled trial that evaluated the long-term impact of this strategy on health, nutrition, income, the role of women, social cohesion and education in Ghana in 2012. They found that, in the villages studied, THP's programs did not lead to any measurable improvement in socioeconomic indicators.

== Financial and accountability reports ==
The Hunger Project raises funds, via contributions, in Australia, Canada, Germany, Japan, New Zealand, Sweden, Switzerland, the Netherlands, the United Kingdom, and the United States. According to its online report, retrieved February 2007, Charity Navigator reports that The Hunger Project's program costs in FY2005 were 80.2% of expenses, and administrative and fundraising costs were 19.8%. Give.org/Better Business Bureau reports that as of December 2006, the Project's program expenses were 77% of total, and administrative and fundraising costs 23% and meets all of its standards. Charity Navigator gives The Hunger Project four out of four stars, and the American Institute of Philanthropy gives it an A− rating.

The Hunger Project met the standards to be listed on the 2004 Combined Federal Campaign National List and the Commonwealth of Virginia 2005 Charity Application.

== The Power of Half donation ==
Kevin Salwen and his then 14-year-old daughter Hannah, authors of The Power of Half, describe in their 2010 book how their family sold their home and donated half the proceeds (about $800,000) to The Hunger Project. The family used the other half of the proceeds to buy a smaller, less expensive home. Their donation was earmarked to help 30,000 rural villagers in over 30 villages in Ghana.

== Public criticism ==
The Hunger Project has been the object of criticism, focused on:

- the organization's original ties (severed in 1991) to Werner Erhard, Erhard Seminars Training, and their philosophies. The origin of the Hunger Project can be seen in the source document "The End of Starvation: Creating an Idea Whose Time Has Come", from 1977, written by Werner Erhard.
- the failure of the Hunger Project to reach its goal of "ending world hunger by 1997...";
- the focus of the Project (1977–1990) on public education and advocacy, rather than providing food and other direct action. On May 30, 1981, the board of directors of Oxfam Canada passed a resolution which stated they would not endorse any activities or programs sponsored by The Hunger Project, nor would they accept funds from the project.

== Governance and administration ==
=== Executive staff ===
- Rowlands Kaotcha, President and chief executive officer
- Jenna Recuber, Deputy CEO
- John Coonrod, Executive Vice President
- Kosha Shiswawala, CFO
- Rowlands Kaotcha, Global Vice President
- Badiul Alum Majumdar, Global Vice President
- Tim Prewitt, Senior Advisor

=== Board membership ===
As of 2023, the board membership was as follows:

- Sheree S. Stomberg, Chair
- Steven J. Sherwood, chair, CWS Capital Partners, LLC
- Joan Holmes, Founding president, The Hunger Project
- Mirna Kay Cunningham Kain, Former Chair of the UN Permanent Forum on Indigenous Issues
- Bineta Diop, Special Envoy of the Chairperson of the African Union Commission on Women, Peace and Security
- Syeda Saiyidain Hameed, former member of Planning Commission for the Government of India
- Koosum Kalyan, Director, Aker Solutions
- Roger Massy-Greene, Chair of Eureka Capital Partners
- Queen Noor of Jordan (honorary)
- Neera Nundy, Managing Partner and co-founder of Dasra
- Amartya Sen, economist, Harvard University. winner of the Nobel Prize in Economics (honorary)
- Tim Prewitt, (Ex Officio)
- M. S. Swaminathan, chair emeritus (heads the MS Swaminathan Research Foundation)
- Charles Deull, Executive Vice President, Clark Transfer, Inc.
