= Edwin Holmes =

Edwin Holmes may refer to:

- Edwin R. Holmes (1878–1961), United States federal judge
- Edwin Holmes (inventor) (1820–1901), American businessman credited with commercializing the electromagnetic burglar alarm
- Edwin Holmes (astronomer) (1839–1919), English amateur astronomer
- Edwin N. Holmes, head football coach for the Middlebury College Panthers football team, 1915–1917
