= Don't Move, Improve =

- Presented by: Alison Cork; Michael Holmes
- Country of origin: United Kingdom
- Original language: English
- No. of series: 1
- No. of episodes: 30

Production
- Running time: 45 minutes (inc. adverts)
- Production company: Shine TV

Original release
- Network: ITV
- Release: 8 May – 23 June 2006

Don't Move, Improve is a British home interior design television programme that aired on ITV from 8 May to 23 June 2006, which was about helping homeowners realise their dream property might be nearer than they think, they might actually be living in it.

The series was about showing people how to identify the potential of their home and, with expert help, made them realise they can get what they want by staying put.

Alison Cork and Michael Holmes assessed the homeowners’ present property and suggested two options of how they could renovate their house to meet their family's needs.

The show then followed the highs and lows of the renovation process. Then, Alison and Michael return to see if the homeowners have followed their advice and discovered the true potential of their home.
