= Judge Holmes =

Judge Holmes may refer to:

- Edwin R. Holmes (1878–1961), judge of the United States Court of Appeals for the Fifth Circuit
- James Leon Holmes (born 1951), judge of the United States District Court for the Eastern District of Arkansas
- Jerome Holmes (born 1961), judge of the United States Court of Appeals for the Tenth Circuit
- Mark V. Holmes (born 1960), judge of the United States Tax Court
- Paul K. Holmes III (born 1951), judge of the United States District Court for the Western District of Arkansas
- Sven Erik Holmes (born 1951), judge of the United States District Court for the Northern District of Oklahoma

== See also ==
- Justice Holmes (disambiguation)
