= Michael Holmes =

Michael Holmes may refer to:

- Michael Holmes (politician), former leader of the United Kingdom Independence Party
- Michael Holmes (journalist), British television presenter and writer
- Michael Holmes (broadcaster) (born 1960), Australian anchor on CNN
- Michael Holmes (saxophonist) (born 1982), American classical saxophonist
- Michael Holmes (whistleblower) (born 1965), U.S. Army National Guard whistleblower
- Mike Holmes (born 1963), Canadian builder/contractor and TV personality
  - Mike Holmes Jr., Canadian builder/contractor and TV personality, son of Mike Holmes (Sr.)
- Mike Holmes (wide receiver) (born 1950), played for several teams in the NFL, CFL, and USFL
- Michael W. Holmes, professor of Biblical Studies and Early Christianity, Bethel University
- Micky Holmes (born 1965), English footballer
- Mike Holmes (politician), member of the Alabama House of Representatives
- James M. Holmes (born 1957), known as Mike, U.S. Air Force general

== See also ==
- Michelle Holmes (born 1967), British actress
- Mitch Holmes (born 1962), Kansas politician
- Mike Holm (1876–1952), Minnesota politician
- Michael Holm (born 1943), German musician
