= I Faked My Own Death =

I Faked My Own Death is a documentary-miniseries on the Discovery Channel, originally aired on September 3, 2011, Three hour-long episodes were aired on Saturday nights for three weeks. The final episode was shown on September 17, 2011.

== Description ==
The show followed the stories of six different individuals who staged their own deaths at some point in their lives. The show attempted to go into the minds of the participants and find out what their motives were for committing death fraud.

The show premiered on 3 September 2011, featuring the story of Benjamin Holmes, the only one of the six not to have faced prison time due to the police corruption that caused him to go into hiding. The stories that followed featured convicted criminals and their tales of mistakes, legal troubles, and regrets.

== Episode guide ==
No.	Title	Original release date
1	"Framed and Fraud"	September 3, 2011
A plane crash is staged and an innocent man goes into hiding after refusing to commit a crime in the opener of the series examining cases in which people have faked their deaths.
2	"For Love and Money"	September 10, 2011
A husband and wife try to evade drug dealers, the law and a suspicious mother-in-law; a bid to illegally cash in a life insurance policy is detailed.
3	"Alligators and Autopsy"	September 17, 2011
An alligator attack is staged to help a Florida drug dealer start a new life; a Texas man exhumes a corpse as a stand-in.

== See also ==
- List of premature obituaries
- Benjamin Holmes (death in absentia)
- Faked death
- Insurance Fraud
