= Brenda Swann Holmes =

American chemist

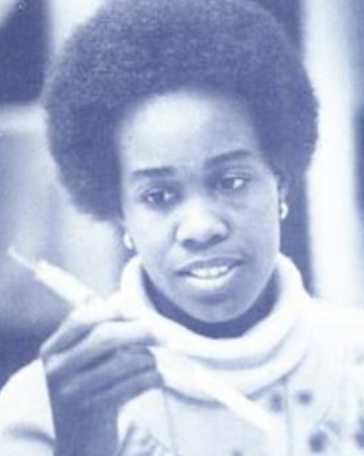
- Brenda Swann Holmes, from a 1980 publication of the Federal Women's Program
- Occupation: Chemist

Brenda Swann Holmes is an American chemist.

== Early life and education ==
Holmes graduated from Howard University in 1971, and earned a Ph.D. in chemistry there in 1976, with a dissertation titled "A Study of Spin-Lattice Relaxation Times of ^{19}F, ^{31}p, and ^{2}D in PF_{6}-In Deuterated Dimethyl Sulfoxide".

== Career ==
Holmes won a National Research Council postdoctoral appointment in chemical research at the U. S. Naval Research Laboratory (NRL), studying nuclear magnetic resonance techniques. In 1985 she won an EEO Award at the NRL. She was with Naval Sea Systems Command (NAVSEA) in the 1990s.

Holmes served on the editorial review committee of the National Technical Association in 1990, and was keynote speaker at the Howard University Graduate Symposium in 1997.

== Publications ==
In the 1980s, Holmes' research was published in Macromolecules, Journal of Magnetic Resonance, and Journal of Applied Polymer Science.

- "Application of the J cross-polarization technique to nitrogen-15 of polyamides in solution" (1981, with G. C. Chingas, W. B. Moniz, and Raymond C. Ferguson)
- "NMR study of nylon 66 in solution (proton, carbon-13, and nitrogen-15 NMR using adiabatic J cross polarization)" (1982, with W. B. Moniz and Raymond C. Ferguson)
- "Spin trapping of .NO_{2} radicals produced by uv photolysis of RDX, HMX, and nitroguanidine" (1983, with M. D. Pace)
- "Cure Monitoring of Polymeric Materials" (1984)
- "Effect of water on the strength of filled polychloroprene vulcanizates" (1986, with Jeffrey A. Hinkley)
- "Cure studies of interpenetrating networks by microdielectrometry" (1988, with Craig A. Trask)
