= Richard Holmes =

Richard Holmes may refer to:

== Entertainment ==
- Richard Holmes (biographer) (born 1946), British biographer
- Richard Holmes (organist) (1931–1991), American jazz organist known as Richard "Groove" Holmes
- Rick Holmes (born 1963), American actor
- Richard Holmes (producer) (born 1963), independent film producer
- Rick Holmes (disc jockey) (1936–2015), American jazz disc jockey

== Sports ==
- Richard Holmes (cricketer) (born 1952), English cricketer
- Richard Holmes (Canadian football) (born 1952), former Canadian Football League running back
- Richard Holmes (footballer) (born 1980), former footballer for Notts County
- Richard G. Holmes (born 1947), former Paralympic athlete and psychologist

== Other ==
- Richard Rivington Holmes (1835–1911), British archivist and courtier
- Richard Holmes (military historian) (1946–2011), British soldier and military historian
- Richard E. Holmes (1944–2026), first black student to enroll at Mississippi State University
- Richard T. Holmes, American ornithologist
- Richard Winn Holmes (1923–1999), associate justice of the Kansas Supreme Court
