= James Holmes =

James Holmes may refer to:

== Artists ==
- Jimmy "Duck" Holmes (born 1947), American blues musician
- James Flournoy Holmes, album cover artist
- James Holmes (actor) (born 1965), British actor
- James Holmes (artist) (1777–1860), English painter
- James Roland Holmes (1939–1999), organist, partner of Ned Rorem
- James S. Holmes (1924–1986), Dutch poet and translator

== Criminals ==
- James Holmes (mass murderer) (born 1987), convicted of the 2012 Aurora theater shooting
- James William Holmes (1956–1994), convicted murderer of Don Lehman

== Public servants ==
- James Holmes (politician) (1831–1910), member of the New Zealand Legislative Council
- James Howard Holmes (born 1943), diplomat
- James Leon Holmes (born 1951), U.S. federal judge
- James M. Holmes (born 1957), United States Air Force general

== Sportspeople ==
- Ducky Holmes (James William Holmes, 1869–1932), baseball player
- Jim Holmes (baseball) (1882–1960), baseball pitcher
- Jimmy Holmes (footballer, born 1908) (1908–1971), English footballer
- Jimmy Holmes (footballer, born 1953), Irish footballer
- Jim Holmes (footballer) (born 1954), Scottish footballer

== Trade unionists ==
- James Holmes (trade unionist) (1861–1934), English railway industry trade unionist
- Jimmy Holmes (trade unionist) (1850–1911), English hosiery industry trade unionist

== Other ==
- James H. Holmes (1826–1900), Baptist minister in Richmond, Virginia

== See also ==
- Jamie Holmes (disambiguation)
