= Michael Holmes (journalist) =

- Born: Leeds, England
- Occupations: TV Presenter, author, journalist
- Notable credit(s): How to Build a House; Don't Move, Improve; Renovating for profit
- Spouse: Emma Kirby
- Children: 3

Michael Holmes is an English property expert and presenter of multiple property-based television shows on networks such as BBC1, Channel 4, Five, ITV, Channel 4, Discovery Real Time and UK Style. He is also the Editor-In-Chief of several British home magazines and author of Renovating For Profit.

== Career ==
=== Television ===
Holmes began his television career in 1997 as a property expert on Five series Hot Property. Later, he was the property expert on BBC2's All the Right Moves. He has also been the property expert on Channel 4's Richard & Judy. He later presented the BBC1 property-based TV show; Trading Up.

Holmes was formerly the presenter of UK Style TV show Hard Sell where, along with a gardening expert, he helped to transform properties that were lagging on the property market. His most recent series is I Own Britain's Best Home.

Has presented property programmes on the Discovery Real Time such as How to Build a House and Build, Buy or Restore. The latter has spawned a spin-off also hosted by Holmes, Build, Buy or Restore: Abroad.

He has also presented the recent ITV property series Good Bid, Good Buy as well as the first series of Don't Move, Improve. On Quest television the repeats are being shown of Build, Buy or Restore Abroad as of 7 June 2014

=== Magazines and publications ===
Holmes is the Editor-in-Chief of British homes-market newsstand publications such as Real Homes, Homebuilding & Renovating magazine and Period Living, all monthly.

He has also written for leading British newspapers, including The Daily Telegraph, Sunday Times, Daily Express, Daily Mirror and The Independent, and appeared on news programmes such as BBC Breakfast.

Michael also is a leading seminar speaker at the Homebuilding & Renovating Show, held around the country, and the annual National Home Improvement Show at London's Earls Court Exhibition Centre.

=== Books ===
- Renovating for Profit (2008) (ISBN 0091896002)
