= Mary Holmes =

Mary Holmes may refer to:

- Mary Adams Holmes (1910–2002), Artist and Professor
- Mary Anne Holmes (1773–1805), Irish poet and writer
- Mary Emilie Holmes (1850–1906), American geologist
- Mary Emma Holmes (1839-1937), American reformer, suffragist, and religious teacher
- Mary Jane Holmes (1828–1907), American author
- Mary Rehling Holmes, American golf coach

== See also ==
- Mary Holmes College in Mississippi, founded in 1892
