= Dopesick Nation =

American documentary television series

- Genre: Documentary
- Starring: Allie Severino; Frank Holmes
- Country of origin: United States
- No. of seasons: 1
- No. of episodes: 10

Production
- Executive producers: Jenny Daly; Pat McGee; Ian Manheimer; Jaime Manheimer; Patrick Moses
- Camera setup: Multi-Camera; Handheld HDV cameras
- Running time: 44 minutes

Original release
- Network: Viceland
- Release: September 12, 2018

Dopesick Nation, also known as "American Junkie" and "American Relapse", is an American documentary television series that premiered on September 12, 2018. The series takes place in southern Florida and follows two recovering addicts, Allie and Frankie, and their journey to take on the opioid epidemic by assisting as many addicts into recovery as they can. The series also sheds light on the "recovery capital of America", Delray Beach, and the corruption and exploitation that exist in the rehab industry.

== Episodes ==
No.	Title	Original release date
1.1	"All in the Industry"	September 12, 2018
Frankie works to help Nate, a former recovery advocate-turned-heroin addict, get his life and his son back. Allie tries to help her best friend Kelly get a scholarship to rehab.
1.2	"These Are All Good Veins"	September 19, 2018
Allie tries to assist her friend Kelly to check into detox. Frankie meets Chris, a newly homeless father who is headed down a dark path.
1.3	"Love in Vein"	September 26, 2018
Tiffany, a heroin addict, turns to prostitution to support her habit, and Frankie tries to reach her before she falls to her addiction. Allie aims to find a homeless addict that may need her help.
1.4	"Warrior Down"	October 3, 2018
A talented artist's life unravels as he turns to drugs to cope with his father's death. Allie's longtime friend continues her recovery while battling the demons caused by her 20-year tumultuous addiction.
1.5	"Death Rattle"	October 10, 2018
Frankie checks in on Chris, an addict who keeps lying about his participation in rehab. Allie partakes in a dangerous and traumatizing rescue.
1.6	"Till Dope Do Us Part"	October 17, 2018
Heroin addicts Chris and Rachel must free themselves of their tumultuous, co-dependent relationship. Frankie faces his past demons when he visits his hometown.
1.7	"The Young & The Desperate"	October 24, 2018
Young and homeless, serious health concerns compel Kyle to seek out rehab. Gwen, a new drug user, considers tricking after she loses her day job.
1.8	"Mother of All Pain"	October 31, 2018
Allie helps opiate-addicted Tia cope with her past childhood abuse. Frankie works with veteran amputee Scotty, whose heroin addiction left him homeless.
1.9	"Rehab Romance"	November 7, 2018
The recovery of an ex-addict is put to the test when she tries to save her husband from addiction. A meth addict tries to start a new beginning.
1.10	"Dying for Freedom"	November 14, 2018
Frankie is on the verge of having a full-blown relapse as he and Allie try to help a junkie couple who are trapped in a notoriously dangerous area in Palm Beach County.
