= Holmes v. California National Guard =

1998 court case in California

- Court: United States Court of Appeals for the Ninth Circuit
- Full case name: Holmes v. California National Guard
- Argued: July 8, 1996
- Submitted: April 7, 1997
- Decided: September 5, 1997
- Citations: 124 F.3d 1126; 71 Empl. Prac. Dec. (CCH) ¶ 45,000; 97 Cal. Daily Op. Serv. 7165; 97 Daily Journal D.A.R. 11,571

Court membership
- Judges sitting: Thomas M. Reavley (5th Cir.), Stephen Reinhardt, Charles E. Wiggins

Case opinions
- Majority: Wiggins, joined by Reavley
- Dissent: Reinhardt

Laws applied
- First Amendment; Equal Protection Clause

Andrew Holmes v. California National Guard, 124 F.3d 1126 (9th Cir. 1998) was a federal court case heard by the Ninth Circuit Court of Appeals, that upheld the "don't ask, don't tell" policy that restricted service by gays and lesbians in the California National Guard of the United States. The court decided that a member of the National Guard could not be discharged for saying publicly that he or she is homosexual or bisexual, but could be restricted to assignments that did not require recognition by the federal government.

== Military policy ==
"Don't Ask, Don't Tell" (DADT) is the common name for federal policy established in part by law Pub. L. 103–160 (10 U.S.C. § 654), enacted by the Congress of the United States in 1993, and in part by the military regulations that implemented that legislation, which restricted inquiries and investigations into the sexual orientation of a service member. It prevented homosexual members of the armed services from dismissal solely on the grounds of their sexual orientation. Under the policy, military officials were prohibited from initiating inquiries into the sexual orientation a service member. Any service member who stated that he or she was gay or lesbian would be discharged.

== Background ==
Andrew Holmes enlisted in the California National Guard in 1986. He was sworn in and commissioned as an officer in May 1988. Over the course of his service he received honors for his work, including a promotion to First Lieutenant and combat Military Police platoon leader. He was also awarded the Army Achievement Medal, the Army Reserve Components Achievement Medal, and the National Defense Service Ribbon for his exemplary performance during Operation Desert Shield and Operation Desert Storm.

Holmes claimed he was pressured by his superiors to issue a statement affirming his heterosexuality. Instead, he presented a memo to his commanding officer stating that as "a matter of conscience, honesty and pride, I am compelled to inform you that I am gay." The U.S. Army National Guard (USARNG) responded by declaring that due to his homosexuality, he would be discharged from the California Army National Guard and the Army National Guard of the United States. In June 1993, Holmes was notified that his commanding officer had issued a request to remove the First Lieutenant's federal recognition as a consequence of the statement acknowledging his homosexuality. Holmes was unable to convince the federal recognition withdraw board that he had no intention of partaking in homosexual activities, and was consequently discharged from the California Army National Guard (CAARNG) on May 21, 1994.

== District Court ruling ==
In February 1995, Holmes sued the California and National Army Guards in the United States District Court for the Northern District of California, claiming that the "don't ask, don't tell" policy was unconstitutional because it violated his right to equal protection and to free speech. He sought damages as well as injunctive relief and declaratory relief. The U.S. District Court granted summary judgment to Holmes on his federal equal protection and free speech claims against the CAARNG and USARNG.

== Ninth Circuit decision ==
On September 5, 1997, in a 2-1 decision, a panel of the Ninth Circuit Court of Appeals reversed the lower court's decision and denied Holmes' equal protection claim. The court determined that homosexuals are not considered a suspect class and subjected Holmes' claims to rational basis review. The court found the military had legitimate reasons for the exclusion of gay and lesbian service members because the military reasonably believed that they posed a threat to the successful maintenance of discipline and combat readiness. The court ruled the plaintiff's discharge did not violate his free speech rights because it was based not on his statement, but on the "inference of homosexual conduct." Judge Stephen Reinhardt dissented.

The United States Supreme Court rejected Holmes' petition for a writ of certiorari.

== See also ==
- Sexual orientation and military service
- LGBT rights in the United States
- 1998 in LGBT rights
