= Ben Holmes (baseball) =

American baseball player (1858–1949)

- Third baseman
- Born: April 3, 1858; King and Queen County, Virginia, U.S.
- Died: May 11, 1949 (aged 91); Washington, D.C., U.S.

Negro league baseball debut
- 1886, for the Cuban Giants

Last appearance
- 1891, for the Cuban Giants

Teams
- Cuban Giants (1886–1888, 1891)

Benjamin F. Holmes (April 3, 1858 – May 11, 1949) was an American Negro league third baseman in the 1880s and 1890s.

A native of King and Queen County, Virginia, Holmes played several seasons for the Cuban Giants between 1886 and 1891. He died in Washington, D.C., in 1949 at age 91.
