= Charles Holmes (disambiguation) =

Charles Holmes (1868–1936) was a British painter, art critic and museum director.

Charles Holmes may also refer to:

- Charles Holmes (Royal Navy officer) (1711–1761), British naval officer and MP, Wolfe's third-in-command during the capture of Quebec in 1759
- Charles H. Holmes (1827–1874), member of the U.S. House of Representatives from New York
- Charlie Holmes (1910–1985), saxophonist
- Charlie Holmes (footballer) (1910–1981), Australian footballer for Fitzroy
- Charlie Holmes, frontman of English rock band Heart in Hand
- Chuck Holmes (entrepreneur) (1945–2000), American entrepreneur and philanthropist, founded Falcon Studios
- Chuck Holmes (ice hockey) (1934–2019), ice hockey player
