= Esther Aberdeen Holm =

American geologist and paleontologist (1904–1984)

- Born: January 06, 1904; Chicago, Illinois
- Died: May 4, 1984 (aged 80)
- Education: University of Chicago
- Spouse: Donald August Holm

Esther Aberdeen Holm (January 6, 1904 – May 4, 1984) was an American academic who began as a paleontologist before turning to applied geology.

== Early life ==
Born in Chicago, Illinois she made many trips to Lake Michigan where her passion for geology began. Through encouragement from her mother, she was able to support herself through her years attending Northwestern University by working as a stenographer for an advertising company. She married on August 15, 1953, to Donald August Holm who she met while working in Algiers. At the time, she traveled to Saudi Arabia where she grew fond of Arabian horses and brought several of them to Arizona.

== Education ==
Holm was hired as a physical education instructor at the YWCA in St. Joseph, Michigan for only a year after her graduation in 1928, before returning to Northwestern University where she had obtained her master's degree in science. After which, she carried on at the institution as a tutor before she entered graduate school at the University of Chicago in 1933, studying only for a year before she postponed her studies to work as a geology instructor at Milwaukee-Downer College for one more year. In 1937 Holm received her Ph.D. from the University of Chicago with a major in paleontology.

== Career ==
Five years after receiving her Ph.D. (1942), she changed her career from being an assistant professor at Wellesley College to being involved in terrain interpretation and preparation of applied geologic maps for the Military Geology Branch of the U.S. Geological Survey. A short two years later (1944), Esther wrote a section on the roads of Mindanao. She was a part of the Military Geology Unit which did an immense amount of work during WW2 producing maps of inaccessible foreign areas. From 1946 to 1948, Esther made geological contributions toward the war effort, outlined below. Esther went to the 19th International Geological Congress in Algiers in 1952, where she met her soon to be husband Donald Holm who was a geologist. During her stay in Algiers, Esther taught Economic Geography to a variety of people. Esther's contribution to the study of diatoms and Radiolaria was included in the Treatise on Ecology and Paleoecology in 1957. Always finding things to contribute to, she transferred from Washington to Flagstaff, AZ in 1965 to the Branch of Astrology contributed to the program of studies of the lunar equatorial zone Finally retiring in 1971, Esther received the highest award of the Interior Department, the Distinguished Service Medal.

== War Contributions ==
Esther Holm was a part of the Military Geology Unit which did an immense amount of work during WW2 producing maps of inaccessible foreign areas. At the time, maps were needed to show “construction materials and water supplies...track cross-country movement” and detect underground installations (p. 9). A colleague of hers, Alice Allen said, "Terrain information was so urgently needed overseas that all waking hours were spent in the 'dungeon'--the basement quarters for classified work--except for time needed on Sundays to wash enough clothes to get through the next week." With Charles B. Hunt's influence, she created a fast-paced system that allowed interpretation of map data by looking at “expanded map legends and tables”(p. 9). Through the years 1946–1948, Esther was assigned to field-check the intelligence for Operation Coronet (the invasion of the island of Honshu, Japan) which was to take place on March 1, 1946 She completed a series of terrain-intelligence field checks and then played a key role in the beginning of the Pacific Island Mapping Program. She made several trips to Okinawa and one to Palau. She proved to be a first-class staff officer. The result of her efforts was a “Strategic Engineering Study” for army operatives that were still used after the second world war (p. 9). Following the war, her technology was applied to fields such as “engineering geology, environmental studies, and planetary geology”(p. 9).

== Contributions to Modern Geological Science ==
Holm has made numerous contributions to not only the field of geology, but to the entire discipline of biological sciences. These contributions focus on disambiguating the relationship between fossilized Radiolaria and the deposition of sediments in deep-sea environments. Holm explicates these findings in the Treatise on Marine Ecology and Paleoecology, delineating the nature of Radiolaria, as well as disambiguating the nature of the relationship between Fossilized Radiolaria and sedimentary deposition.

Specifically, Holm purported that fossilized Radiolaria exhibits two principle conditions which result in such fossils creating a significant contribution to marine sediment. These two conditions are: Radiolaria are not subject to decomposition when sinking towards the ocean floor; and, Fossilized Radiolaria are not hidden by additional sedimentary material.

Additionally, Holm explicated the ancient environments which supported populations of Radiolaria, subsequently providing several accounts of how Radiolaria fossilized in a myriad of different types and ages of rocks. All of these findings serve to augment the general understanding of how ancient biological factors and circumstances have impacted contemporary geological findings, most saliently being the deposition of marine sediments.

While Holm's was in the Military Geology Branch, she was able to do significant research and write plenty of reports for the Corps of Engineers. Following a career that was heavily dictated by war, Holm's wrote very few papers that went unpublished. She turned her focus to applied geology and astrology specializing and providing information about the lunar landscape and lunar terrain mapping. With her knowledge in terrain analysis, she did research on lunar areas that would be the most suitable for landings by both crewed and uncrewed spacecraft and probes.

Holm's research played a role in studying river deltas. Her ideas were the basis on classifying the features of deltas.
