= Mark Holmes =

Mark Holmes may refer to:

- Mark V. Holmes (born 1960), United States judge
- Mark Holmes (filmmaker) (born 1968), filmmaker and part owner of Daisy 3 Pictures
- Mark Holmes (canoeist) (born 1964), Canadian sprint canoer
- Mark H. Holmes (born 1950), American applied mathematician
- Mark Holmes (musician) (born 1960), vocalist and bassist for the Canadian new wave band Platinum Blonde
- Mark Holmes, writer for the Christian-based television series Gerbert
- Mark Holmes, member of the Los Angeles band Bleed the Dream
