= Joseph Holmes =

Joseph or Joe Holmes may refer to:

- Joseph Holmes (New Jersey politician) (1736–1809), American politician
- Joseph Erskine Holmes (born 1940), Northern Irish politician
- Joseph John Holmes (1866–1942), Australian politician
- Joseph Warren Holmes (1824–1912), American sea captain
- Joseph William Holmes (1842–?), Canadian politician
- Joe Holmes (born 1963), American heavy metal guitarist
- Joe Holmes (singer) (1906–1978), Irish fiddler, lilter and singer
- Joseph Holmes (photographer), American photographer
- Joseph Austin Holmes (1859–1915), American geologist and occupational safety and health pioneer
- Joseph R. Holmes (1838–1869), African-American politician
