= Ian Holmes =

Ian Holmes may refer to:

- Ian Holmes (footballer, born 1950), midfielder for Sheffield United, York City, Huddersfield Town
- Ian Holmes (computational biologist), co-creator of the popular BBC Micro game Pipeline
- Ian Holmes (footballer, born 1985), striker for Matlock Town, Mansfield Town and AFC Telford United
- Ian Holmes (runner), English fell runner

== See also ==
- Ian Holm, actor
