= Justice Holmes =

Justice Holmes may refer to:

- Andrew O. Holmes (1906–1965), associate justice of the Tennessee Supreme Court
- Catherine Holmes (born 1956), justice of the Supreme Court of Queensland, Australia
- Oliver Wendell Holmes Jr. (1841–1935), associate justice of the United States Supreme Court from 1902 to 1932
- Richard Winn Holmes (1923–1999), associate justice of the Kansas Supreme Court
- Robert E. Holmes (1922–2004), associate justice of the Ohio Supreme Court

== See also ==
- Judge Holmes (disambiguation)
