= Nick Holmes (disambiguation) =

Nick Holmes is the vocalist of Paradise Lost and Bloodbath.

Nick Holmes may also refer to:

- Nick Holmes (footballer) (born 1954), retired English footballer
- Nick Holmes-Smith (born 1958), Canadian equestrian

== See also ==
- Holmes (disambiguation)
- Nick (disambiguation)
