= Emma Holmes =

American diarist (1838–1910)

Emma Edwards Holmes (December 17, 1838 in Charleston, South Carolina – January 21, 1910 in Charleston, South Carolina) was a resident of South Carolina who kept a diary during the American Civil War. This document has since been published as The Diary of Miss Emma Holmes, 1861-1866 by the Louisiana University Press. It is thought to be a historically significant document due to Emma's in-depth accounting of events occurring during the American Civil War.

== Biography ==
Holmes was born in Charleston, South Carolina, the daughter of a wealthy planter. She was living in Charleston at the time of the 1861 attack on Fort Sumter that began the Civil War.

As a Confederate, Miss Holmes' writings reflected the early confidence of the Southern United States at the start of the war, but later turned to despair as the conflict grew closer to home. From February 13, 1861 until April 7, 1866, Emma kept a detailed diary of life in Charleston, the affairs of her family and the swirl of history around her. Through that diary a day-to-day narrative was produced of the life of the Holmes family and of Charleston in general. In the diary's introduction, John F. Marszalek states in regard to Emma Holmes:

A believer in aristocracy, Miss Holmes felt that people could be classed as betters or inferiors, and she often spoke of the mobocracy...she accepted slavery without question...she was a woman of considerable intellect and curiosity...she read widely…her intellectual bent drew her to the teaching profession…she remained a teacher most of her life.

The diary provides a portrait of various members of the Holmes family and their actions during the war period. For instance, on March 18, 1861 Emma reported that "Uncle Edward (Holmes), who was then in Washington, had written to General (Winfield) Scott asking if Fort Sumter really was to be given up, and was answered in the affirmative." Isaac Edward Holmes, who is referred to in this passage, was an 1815 graduate of Yale University and a Congressman from South Carolina from 1838 to 1850. When secession came, he went to Washington and conferred with Secretary of State William Seward, among others, in an effort to maintain peace. After the war, he was a member of a South Carolina delegation that went to Washington to negotiate with the administration of President Andrew Johnson. A subsequent diary entry, on March 20, 1861, reported that, "A letter has been received from Uncle Edward, saying he has seen (Gen. Winfield) Scott, who assured him there would be no collision between the two forces but never even mentioned Fort Sumter." Many subsequent diary entries made reference to visits from and meals with Uncle Edward after his return from Washington, with his analysis of troop movements around Washington.

The first part of the diary, while outlining war preparation and the early part of the war, also presented a fascinating picture of life in the antebellum South. On March 31, 1862, Emma reported that "We were surprised by the arrival before breakfast of cousin Wilmot (De Saussure) and Governor (Francis) Pickens," who came by to take the family to view fortifications around the city. The next day, on April 1, 1862, she wrote,

We walked to visit the fortifications..., the gentlemen had provided us with fruit cake and champagne for lunch. The dinner was laid in a tent and was very nice, but camp life was shown by the deficiency of china…its place being supplied by tin ware.

On the following day, the entry advised that,

We went to dinner about two o'clock in a large tent in the garden. The dinner was in regular city style, boned turkey, ham, lobster, salad, etc, but it was also laid in camp fashion - all the dessert being on at the same time...fresh preserved peaches, jelly and pound cake and afterwards ice cream and of course champagne and wines.

Another diary entry dated March 12, 1863 presented a chilling view of slavery:

Margaret (a slave) had become so excessively negligent and indifferent to her duties…that Carrie (Caroline Holmes White, Emma's sister) asked Isaac to punish her...He...after dark took her to an extreme end of the garden, intending to reprimand her and with a light strap gave her two or three cuts across her shoulders... She tore away...and sprang into the creek…she plunged head foremost...Mr. Bull had the creek dragged unsuccessfully...and the current must have swept the body out... She had (said) a few days ago that if she was ever touched again she would drown or kill herself…But none dreamed of such a demoniac temper...It put poor Isaac nearly crazy, for he blamed himself as...undue severity... Poor fellow, to have his peace of mind destroyed by the blind rage of such a creature is too dreadful.

Another entry, on July 16, 1861, described a house slave who evidently killed a neighbor's infant child. Emma wondered, "what was the cause of this act, we cannot imagine."

Emma often conveyed news of her brother Henry (Dr. Henry M. Holmes, Jr.) in her diary. On March 21, 1863, her diary entry was as follows:

Brother Henry has written me an account of a 12 days trip in the Cumberland Mountains hunting bushwackers, as the Tories there are called, in which they underwent frightful cold exposure and fatigue, through pouring rains...almost without food, the wagons having to be left behind; they went from Tennessee to Western North Carolina.

Earlier, on November 9, 1862, Miss Holmes reported,

Mother received a letter ...from Henry, dated Tennessee...his company was in the battle of Richmond, Kentucky and received the credit from Maj. Brown, chief of Gen. Kirby Smith's staff, of winning that battle by enabling our forces to outflank the enemy...he is still only sergeant, through acting surgeon also. The medical department refused to commission him as a surgeon to the company, as it is too small.

Holmes wrote multiple antisemitic passages in her diary. She stated that she disliked living in "Sumter very much from the prevalence of sand & Jews, my great abhorrences." By 1862, Holmes was blaming all of her ills on Jewish people. Holmes was particularly repulsed by the notion of relationships and offspring between non-Jewish Black people and white Jewish people. In a July 1864 diary entry, she described a train trip from Camden where she witnessed two Jewish male youths and their two Black female slaves. Holmes wrote that the Jewish slave owners "seemed on the most intimate & familiar terms" with their slaves and suspected that "miscegenation had already commenced - disgustingly." In August 1865, she expressed disgust that she knew of two formerly enslaved Black men who had moved North and married white Yankee woman, one of whom was a white Jewish woman, writing that the idea of a Black man marrying a "Jewess" was "too revolting" to contemplate.
