= Jamie Holmes (author) =

American author (born 1980)

- Born: April 8, 1980 (age 46)
- Education: New York University; Columbia University
- Occupation: Nonfiction writer
- Writing career
- Subjects: Science, World War II
- Website: www.jamieholmesbooks.com

Jamie Holmes (born April 8, 1980) is an American author. His writing has appeared in The New York Times, The New Yorker, The Atlantic, The New Republic, and Slate, among many other publications. Holmes has written two books. The first, Nonsense: The Power of Not Knowing, was published by Penguin Random House (Crown) in 2015 and explores the psychology of uncertainty. He is also the author of 12 Seconds of Silence: How a Team of Inventors, Tinkerers, and Spies Took Down a Nazi Superweapon, about the creation of the proximity fuse, which was published on August 4, 2020 by Houghton Mifflin Harcourt.

== Life and career ==
Born in Boston, Massachusetts, and raised in Chicago and Boston, Holmes received his undergraduate degree from New York University in 2002. After college he served in the Peace Corps in Iași, Romania, teaching English, and worked as a Research Coordinator at Harvard University, where he focused on behavioral economics. In 2009, he received a Master of International Affairs from Columbia University's School of International and Public Affairs. From 2009 to 2012, Holmes worked as a research associate, program associate, and policy analyst at New America. He is currently a Future Tense Fellow at New America and lives in Washington, D.C.

He is the son of Nancy Maull and political scientist Stephen Holmes.

== Reception ==
Holmes received widespread attention for his 2011 article in the New Republic, "Why Can't More Poor People Escape Poverty," as well as for his 2015 Op-Ed in the New York Times, "The Case for Teaching Ignorance." His book Nonsense: The Power of Not Knowing was reviewed favorably by the Washington Post, Kirkus Reviews, and New York Magazine, among other outlets.

Reviewing 12 Seconds of Silence in Air Mail, the renowned historian Andrew Roberts described the book as: “Meticulously researched and well-written…a prescient reminder of the role of science in both power and peace…an impressive and necessary monument to the spirit and sacrifice of the Americans whose innovation proved so imperative in winning the Second World War.” Roberts acknowledged that book corrects the "egregious error" of past histories which claim that the British invented the fuse and merely delivered it to the Americans to manufacture. In fact, most of the hard work was done by the Office of Scientific Research and Development's Section T.
