= Susan Holmes (disambiguation) =

Susan Holmes may refer to:

- Susan Holmes (born 1972), American model
- Susan Holmes (fabric artist) (born 1941), New Zealand fabric artist
- Susan Holmes (politician) (1942–2025), American politician
- Susan Carter Holmes (born 1933), English botanist
- Susan P. Holmes, American statistician
