= Edwin N. Holmes =

American football coach

Biographical details
- Born: September 5, 1889; Duluth, Minnesota, U.S.
- Died: November 8, 1973 (aged 84); Tulsa, Oklahoma, U.S.

Playing career

Football
- 1914: Springfield YMCA
- Position: Tackle

Coaching career (HC unless noted)

Football
- 1915–1916: Middlebury

Basketball
- 1917–1918: Lawrence

Head coaching record
- Overall: 8–6–3 (football); 4–2 (basketball)

Edwin Noyes Holmes (September 5, 1889 – November 8, 1973) was an American college football and college basketball coach and educator. He served as the head football coach at Middlebury College in Middlebury, Vermont from 1915 to 1916, compiling a record of 8–6–3. Holmes was also the head basketball coach at Lawrence College—now known as Lawrence University—in Appleton, Wisconsin for one season, in 1917–18, tallying a mark of 4–2.

Holmes graduated from the University of Sioux Falls and coached football for two years at William Jewell College in Liberty, Missouri. He played football in 1914 as a tackle at the International YMCA College—now known as Springfield College—in Springfield, Massachusetts, where took a three-year course in physical education. Holmes was hired as physical director at Middlebury in 1915, succeeding Ray Fisher. In 1917, he was hired at Lawrence College to succeed Mark Catlin Sr. as coach. In 1918, Holmes was appointed as athletic director for military training camps in the vicinity of Austin, Texas.

A native of Minneapolis, Holmes moved to Tulsa, Oklahoma, from Muskogee, Oklahoma, in 1920. There he was the owner of the Tulsa Monument Company, until retiring in 1956, and a member of the board of directors of the Morris Plan Bank and Security Federal Savings & Loan Association. Holmes died on November 8, 1973, of an apparent heart attack.

== Head coaching record ==
=== Football ===
Year	Team	Overall	Conference	Standing	Bowl/playoffs
Middlebury (Independent) (1915–1916)
1915	Middlebury	3–4–2			
1916	Middlebury	5–2–1			
Middlebury:		8–6–3			
Total:		8–6–3			
