= Jim Holm =

American politician (born 1945)

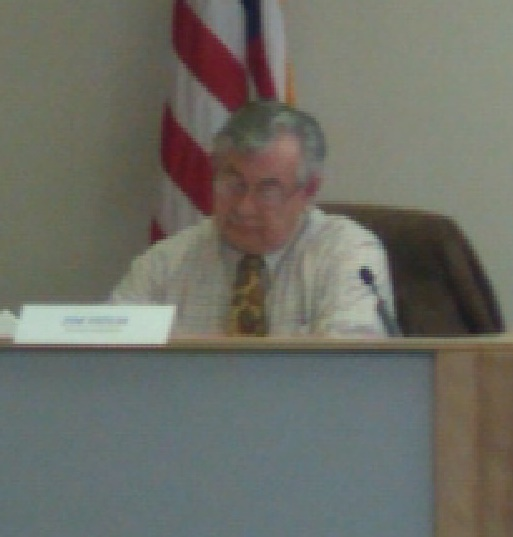
Jim Holm

Jim Holm (born July 15, 1945) was an American businessman and politician.

Born in Glendale, California, Holm settled in Fairbanks, Alaska in 1946 and graduated from Lathrop High School in Fairbanks in 1963. He went to University of Alaska Fairbanks. He was the owner of Holm Town Nursery. From 1999 to 2003, he served on the Fairbanks North Star Borough, Alaska Assembly. He then served in the Alaska House of Representatives from 2003 to 2007 and was a Republican.
