= Joan Holmes =

- Born: 1935 (age 90–91); United States
- Occupations: School Psychologist; Consulting Educational Psychologist, Erhard Seminars Training; President, CEO, The Hunger Project
- Website: Corporate Website, The Hunger Project

Joan Holmes (born 1935) is an American psychologist. She was the founding president of The Hunger Project, and served as one of 31 members on 'Task Force 2 on Hunger' of the UN Millennium Project of 2000–2006. She worked as a consulting educational psychologist for Erhard Seminars Training (est) prior to establishing The Hunger Project in 1977.

== Education ==
Holmes has a B.A. in psychology from the University of Colorado, and an M.A. in psychology from San Francisco State University.

== Career ==
=== Erhard Seminars Training ===
Holmes held a position as Lecturer and Supervisor at California State University, Hayward from 1971 to 1975. She subsequently served as a "consulting educational psychologist" for Erhard Seminars Training.

"EST training altered everything for me", Holmes stated in 1975. She also served as consulting educational psychologist for the preparation of the book A look at est in education.

Werner Erhard decided to utilize Holmes in conjunction with The Hunger Project:

To run the project, Erhard tapped ... Joan Holmes, a 1973 est graduate who had served in various est staff positions over the years.

In 1975, Holmes served as consulting educational psychologist for the preparation of the book A look at est in education: Analysis, review and selected case studies of the impact of the est experience on educators and students in primary, secondary, and post-secondary education, by Robert W. Fuller and Zara Wallace.

In August 1977, the est organization presented Holmes to its "graduates" as:

The est Foundation's manager for the recently announced project that has been formally named The Hunger Project.

In a 1980 memo, Holmes stated:

Est graduates represent the state of transformation in the world, the space of having the world work for everyone. Four years ago the graduates took on The Hunger Project and the end of starvation on our planet...

She was principal author in 1985 of Ending hunger: An idea whose time has come, by The Hunger Project (corporate author), ISBN 0-03-005549-0.

=== The Hunger Project ===
Holmes served as the principal author of the book Ending Hunger: An Idea Whose Time Has Come. She made $232,010.00 as president of The Hunger Project in 2004. Administrative and fundraising expenses in 2004 accounted for 23.5% of total expenses. Based on this information, Charity Navigator gave The Hunger Project three out of four stars. The American Institute of Philanthropy give it an A− rating. According to Charity Navigator:

Compensation for the CEO of this charity is equal to 2.97% of this organization's total functional expenses.

== See also ==
- The Hunger Project
- Oxfam Canada
- World Food Conference
- Erhard Seminars Training
