= Frank E. Holmes =

American businessman

Frank Edward Holmes

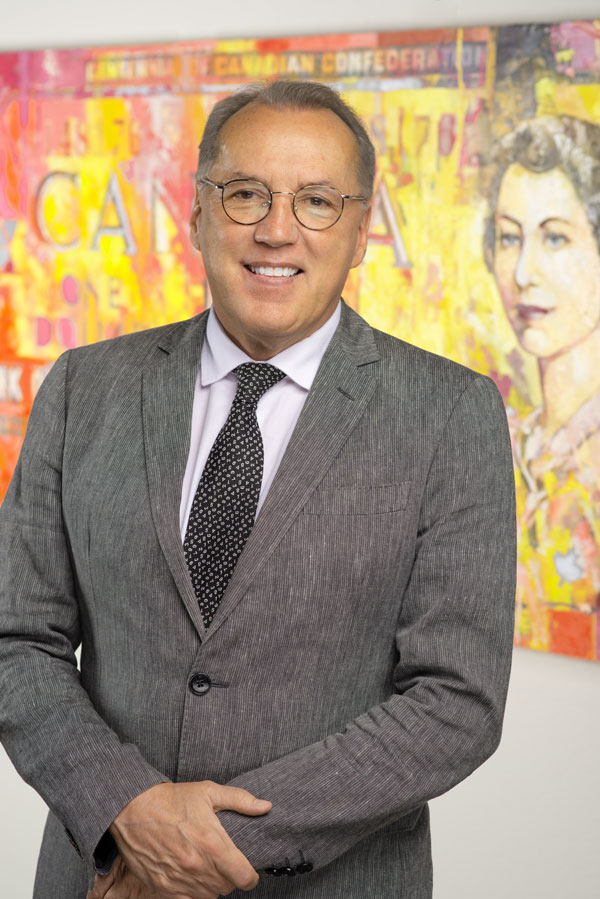
Frank Holmes CEO US Global Investors)

Frank Edward Holmes is an American businessman and investor. He is currently the Executive Chairman of Hive Digital Technologies Ltd., the first Bitcoin miner to go public in 2017 on the TSX.V, and CEO and Chief Investment Officer at U.S. Global Investors, Inc. U.S. Global Investors is an investment management firm located in San Antonio, TX.

== Early life and education ==
Holmes received an undergraduate degree from the University of Western Ontario - Huron University College.

== Business career ==
=== U.S. Global Investors ===
Prior to Holmes’ involvement, U.S. Global Investors (then known as United Services Advisors) was rocked by a scandal involving one of the firm’s fund managers, who was found to be taking bribes from stock promoters. Both the manager and the promoters were convicted of criminal charges for their roles in the case. The United States Securities and Exchange Commission (SEC) discovered that the president of United Services knew of the illegal behavior before he disclosed it to the commission. In 1989, United Services Advisors was put up for sale at auction and won by Holmes for $2.2 million, or $4 a share.

The company was rebranded to U.S. Global Investors and regained its reputation. The company, which offers 10 different funds, is now profitable, according to regulatory filings for the quarter ended December 31, 2020. Holmes owns 100% of the voting shares of U.S. Global Investors.

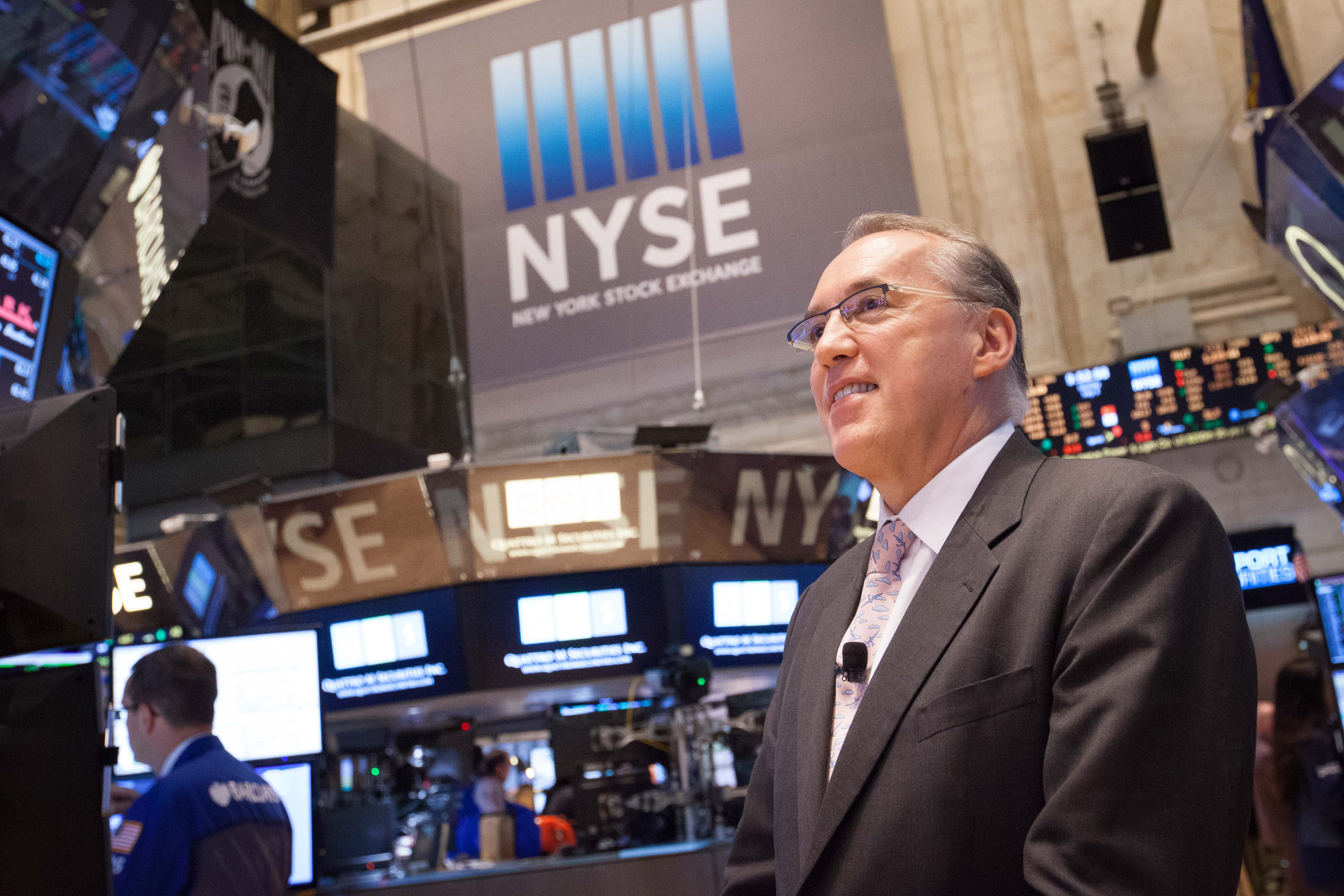
Frank Holmes visiting the New York Stock Exchange in April 2015.

In 2006, Holmes was named Mining Fund Manager of the Year by The Mining Journal, a London-based publication for the global natural resources industry.

Holmes became an elected member of the Young Presidents’ Organization (YPO) in 1991 and served as chairman of the San Antonio chapter from 1997 to 1998.

=== Board appointments ===
Holmes has served on the board of various companies and has held leadership positions in several sectors:

Endeavour Financial Corp – Chairman from October 2005 to November 2008.

GoldSpot Discoveries – Chairman of the Board and Director from February 2019 to May 2020.

Thunderbird Entertainment – Served on the Board from June 2014 to February 2021.
