= Benjamin Holmes (death in absentia) =

American who faked his own death

- Born: 1952 (age 73–74); Cleveland, Ohio
- Known for: Faking his own death

Benjamin Holmes (born 1952) is a man from Cleveland, Ohio, US, who is known for faking his own death and evading detection for 20 years.

== Biography ==
In 1979, Benjamin Holmes was an auto repairman in Cleveland working on his master's degree in engineering. Holmes was approached by Italian Mafia members and was asked to make a muffler for a gun. He refused, and took the story to the police; however, Holmes was approached by a cop who also began to pressure Holmes to outfit his guns with suppressors.

In October 1979, Holmes returned to his home from work and discovered the lights in his house were off, including a light that he had always left on. When he entered his home and hit the light switch, he was engulfed in a fiery explosion. The light switch had been connected to a bomb.

During hospitalization for treatment of the burns he suffered, Holmes was visited by someone who accused him of attempting to burn down his own house to collect insurance money. Upon leaving the hospital, Holmes saw the news that he was wanted for several violent crimes he did not commit, and that a shoot on sight order was announced. It was then Holmes realized that someone was setting him up.

Out of desperation, Holmes came to the conclusion he had no choice but to fake his own death. He set the stage for a murder inside his car using a syringe from his medicine cabinet to withdraw and splatter his own blood around the car in an attempt to make it look like he was shot. He left the car running on a deserted road and headed for Lorain, Ohio, where a friend was waiting for him.

Over the next several months, Holmes grew a beard and let his hair grow long. He bought a fraudulent driver's license and tattooed himself to cover the burns on the backs of his hands. He eventually found work in an auto shop.

In 1988, seven years after his disappearance, Holmes was presumed dead and his wife was issued a death certificate. She then collected a $100,000 life insurance check for the presumed loss of her husband.

With the extra money, Holmes moved with his wife and young daughter to a new neighborhood in Youngstown, Ohio. Twenty years after his presumed "death", Holmes caught his wife having an affair, confronted her, and was shot by his wife twice in his midsection. He was rushed to the hospital, where a high school classmate working as a nurse recognized him.

Holmes was then found out, but no charges were filed against him. Holmes still lives in Youngstown and is currently writing a book about his life.

== Television appearance ==
In September 2011 Holmes was featured on the first episode of the Discovery Channel show I Faked My Own Death.

== See also ==
- Death hoax
- List of premature obituaries
- Apparent death
