= Dave Holmes (researcher) =

Canadian professor of nursing, researcher, and author

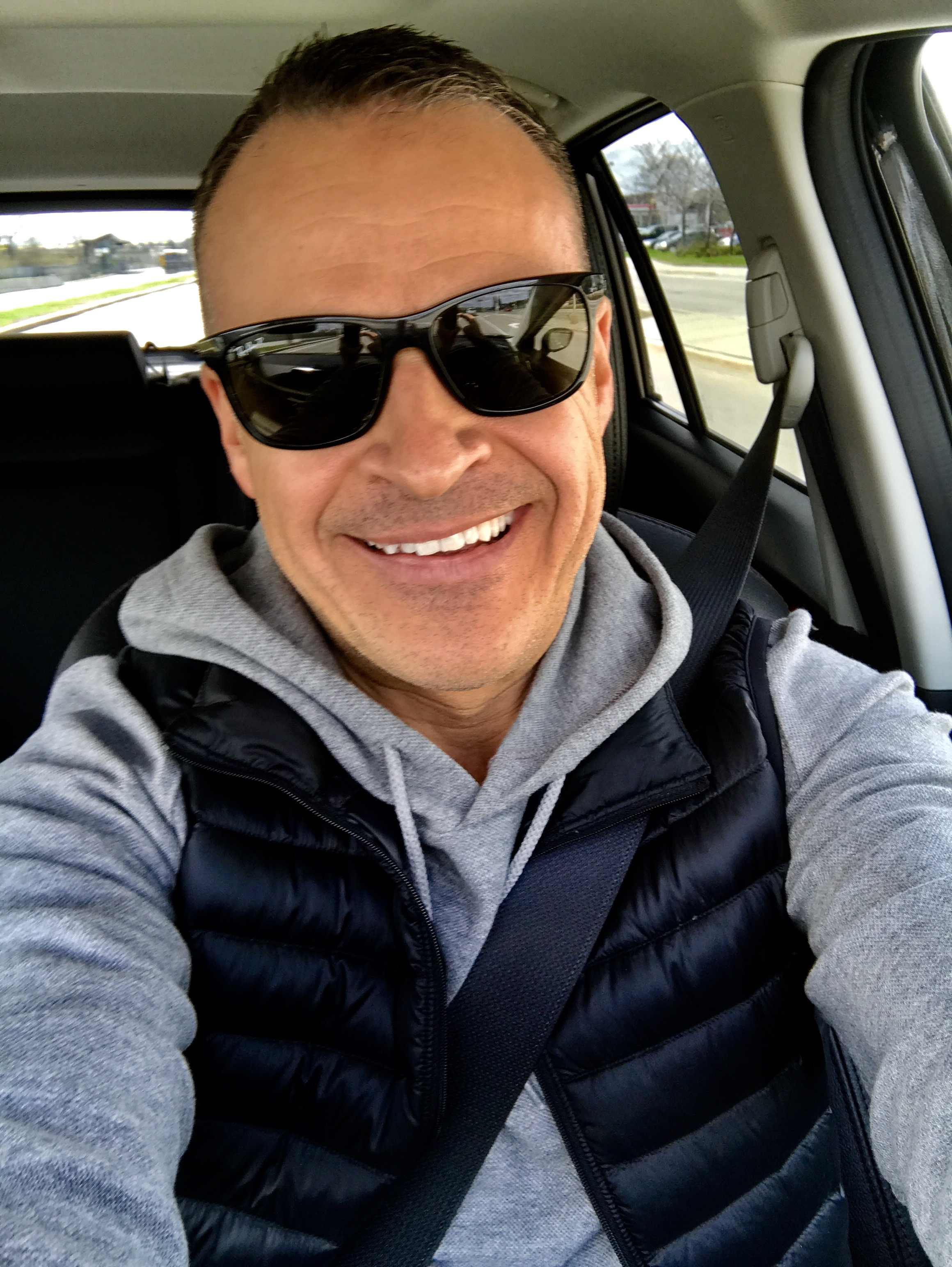
- Born: 20 September 1967 (age 59)
- Education: PhD, Nursing; MSc, Nursing; BSc, Nursing
- Alma mater: Université de Montréal, Montréal, Québec; University of Ottawa, Ottawa, Ontario
- Occupations: Full professor, University of Ottawa; researcher, author, editor-in-chief
- Years active: 2002–present
- Employer: University of Ottawa
- Notable work: Radical Sex Between Men: Assembling Desiring Machines (Routledge, 2017)
- Awards: Fellow of the American Academy of Nursing (2019–) Fellow of the Canadian Academy of Nursing (2021-)
- Website: [www.drdaveholmes.com]

Dave Holmes is a Canadian professor of nursing, researcher, and author based in Ottawa, Ontario, Canada. His research and writing are focused in the fields of public health, forensic nursing, critical theory, epistemology, law, ethics, psychiatric nursing, correctional nursing, the sociopolitical aspects of nursing, sexuality, and public health nursing.

== Biography ==
Holmes earned his bachelor's degree in nursing from the University of Ottawa in 1991, his MSc in nursing from the Université de Montréal in 1998, and his PhD in nursing from the Université de Montréal in 2002. In 2003, he completed a CIHR postdoctoral fellowship in health care, technology, and place at the University of Toronto, Faculty of Social Work. Since then he has been principal investigator on CIHR and SSHRC funded research projects on risk management in the fields of public health and forensic nursing. Most of Holmes's work and research is based on the poststructuralist works of Gilles Deleuze, Félix Guattari, and Michel Foucault. He has presented at several national and international conferences.

Holmes teaches postgraduate courses at the University of Ottawa. Since 2009 he holds a University Research Chair in Forensic Nursing. Holmes has also been an Honorary Visiting Professor at Binawan Institute of Health Sciences.

Since 2020, Holmes has been identified as one of the top 2% most cited scientists in the world by a team of researchers based at Stanford University, United States.

== Works ==
He has authored over 215 articles in peer-reviewed journals, 55 book chapters, and 7 books. Professor Holmes was also one of the interviewees for Philosophy of Nursing: 5 Questions.

In January 2009, he co-wrote a paper with Janet L. McCabe entitled: Reflexivity, critical qualitative research and emancipation: a Foucauldian perspective, which was accepted for publication by the Journal of Advanced Nursing.

In April 2010, Le Devoir published an article in which Holmes, along with his colleague Christabelle Sethna from the University of Ottawa, advocate for government-funded access to abortion as part of comprehensive maternal healthcare, including in Canada's foreign aid programs.
