= Jennifer Holmes =

Jennifer Holmes may refer to:

- Jennifer Holmes (actress), actress who appeared on U.S. TV series Newhart
- Jennifer C. Holmes, actress who appeared on U.S. TV series This Is US

== See also ==
- Jennifer L. Holm (fl. 2000s), American writer
