= Richard Holmes (cricketer) =

English cricketer

Personal information
- Full name: William Richard Holmes
- Born: 25 November 1952 (age 73); Wednesbury, Staffordshire, England
- Batting: Right-handed
- Bowling: Right-arm medium

Domestic team information
- Years: Team
- 1974: Cambridge University

Career statistics
Competition	List A
Matches	1
Runs scored	1
Batting average	1.00
100s/50s	0/0
Top score	1
Balls bowled	66
Wickets	0
Bowling average	–
5 wickets in innings	0
10 wickets in match	–
Best bowling	–
Catches/stumpings	0/–
- Source: Cricinfo, 6 November 2013

William Richard Holmes (born 25 November 1952) is a former English cricketer. Holmes was a right-handed batsman who bowled right-arm medium pace. He was born at Wednesbury, Staffordshire.

While studying at the University of Cambridge, Holmes made a single appearance in List A cricket for the university cricket team in the 1974 Benson & Hedges Cup against Sussex at the County Cricket Ground, Hove. In a match which Sussex won by 186 runs, Holmes bowled eleven wicketless overs and was dismissed for just one run by Mike Buss. This was his only appearance for Cambridge University, with him not featuring in any first-class fixtures for the team.
