= Renita Holmes =

American housing campaigner

Renita Holmes is an American housing activist. She runs consulting practice OUR Homes, specializing in issues related to African-American and inner-city women.

== Early life ==
Holmes was raised by a single mother with 11 children. She was raised in foster care, where she experienced and witnessed abuse. She began a landscaping company as a teenager, later hiring formerly incarcerated women.

== Career and activism ==
Holmes lives in Little Haiti, Miami, where rent has been raising due to rising sea levels. She calls this climate gentrification, in which the poor are pushed out by the rich for climate reasons.

Holmes runs business and property consulting practice OUR Homes and campaigns for housing rights for marginalized communities. She also helps local housing agencies on issues related to African-American and inner-city women. Holmes's work and other activism frequently bring her into conflict with the Miami government and leadership, and has reportedly included physical altercations.

In 2016, Holmes was honored by the Miami Commission for risking her life to save a teenager injured by a bullet.

In 2020, a video of Holmes hugging a police officer during the George Floyd protests went viral.

Holmes is a fellow of Cleo Institute's Empowering Resilient Women program.

In 2023, she was named on the BBC's 100 Women list as one of the world's inspiring and influential women.

== Personal life ==
Holmes is a senior living with disabilities.

Holmes lost a child to gun violence.
