= Peter Holmes =

Peter or Pete Holmes may refer to:

- Peter Holmes (1675–1732), Irish High Sheriff and MP in the Irish House of Commons
- Peter Holmes (1731–1802), Irish High Sheriff and MP in the Parliament of Ireland
- Peter Holmes (businessman) (1932–2002), British businessman
- Pete Holmes (politician) (born 1956), Seattle City Attorney
- Peter Holmes à Court (born 1968), Australian businessman
- Pete Holmes (born 1979), American stand-up comedian, actor, writer, podcaster, and cartoonist
- Peter Holmes (footballer) (born 1980), English footballer
