= Charlie Holmes (footballer) =

Australian rules footballer, born 1910

Personal information
- Full name: Charles Leslie Holmes
- Born: 23 January 1910; Broken Hill, New South Wales
- Died: 30 July 1981 (aged 71); East Melbourne, Victoria
- Height: 183 cm (6 ft 0 in)
- Weight: 73 kg (161 lb)

Playing career^{1}
Years	Club	Games (Goals)
1931	Fitzroy	1 (0)
- ^{1} Playing statistics correct to the end of 1931.

Charles Leslie Holmes (23 January 1910 – 30 July 1981) was an Australian rules footballer who played with Fitzroy in the Victorian Football League (VFL).
