= Harry Holmes =

Harry Holmes may refer to:

- Harry Holmes (boxer)
- Harry Holmes (footballer) (1908–1993), English footballer
- Hap Holmes (Harry George Holmes, 1888–1941), Canadian ice hockey player
- Harry W. Holmes (1896–1986), activist for Esperanto
- Harry Holmes, a character in the TV series Hustle, played by Martin Kemp

== See also ==
- Henry Holmes (disambiguation)
- Harold Holmes (disambiguation)
