= Clara H. Holmes =

American writer

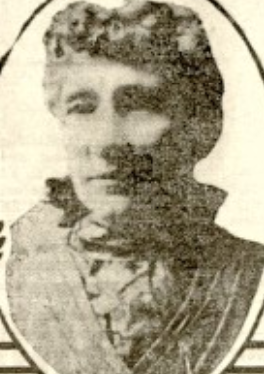
- Clara H. Holmes, from a 1910 newspaper
- Born: 1838; Ohio, U.S.
- Died: July 14, 1927; Colorado Springs, Colorado, U.S.
- Occupation: Writer
- Notable work: Floating Fancies Among the Weird and Occult (1898)

Clara H. Holmes (1838 – July 14, 1927) was an American writer, author of short stories and poems that appeared in magazines and newspapers, and of an early science fiction and horror collection by an American woman, Floating Fancies Among the Weird and Occult (1898).

== Career ==
Holmes contributed to magazines including Midland Monthly, Overland Monthly, and Travel; her poems and stories were also published in newspapers, including Street & Smith's New York Weekly. She published a collection of science fiction and horror short stories, Floating Fancies Among the Weird and Occult (1898), and a collection of poetry, Scattered Autumn Leaves (1926). She ran a florist business in Cripple Creek, Colorado.

== Publications ==
- "Out on the Prairie" (1865, story)
- "My Husband and I" (1865, story)
- "The Foundling, or Why I Endured It" (1865, story)
- "The Shores of Dreamland" (1867, essay)
- "September" (1867, poem)
- "Spring is Coming" (1868, poem)
- "Rowena Clare" (1869, story)
- "A Teacher's Story: Incidents of Western Life" (1892, story)
- "Little Mittie's Christmas" (1896, story)
- "The Cripple Creek Boom" (1896, article)
- "Ferd's Luck: A Character Sketch" (1898, story)
- "A Lilt" (1898, poem)
- Floating Fancies Among the Weird and the Occult (1898, eleven short stories)
- "Fragmentary" (1899, poem)
- "A Hero and His Wife" (1899, story)
- "In Pensive Strain" (1900, poem)
- "How Bess Won Her Wager" (1908, story)
- "Uncle Eben's Mistake" (1908, story)
- "Gordon's Proposal" (1909, story)
- "Mattie's Lucky Find" (1910, story)
- "Trifling Telephone Tangles" (1910, story)
- "How Joe Went Home for Good" (1910, story)
- "A Case of Tit for Tat" (1915, story)
- Scattered Autumn Leaves (1926, poetry)
