= Henry Holmes =

Henry Holmes may refer to:

- Henry Holmes (Yarmouth MP, died 1738), English Member of Parliament for Yarmouth (Isle of Wight)
- Henry Holmes (composer) (1839–1905), English composer and violinist
- Henry Holmes (British Army officer) (1703–1762), MP for Yarmouth
- Henry Holmes (Northern Ireland politician) (1912–1992), MP in the Northern Ireland Parliament for Belfast Shankill
- Henry Holmes (Confederate soldier) (1827–1865), commanded a detachment of Confederate soldiers during the Battle of Picacho Pass
- Henry Holmes (cricketer) (1833–1913), English cricketer
- H. Allen Holmes (born 1933), American diplomat
- H. H. Holmes (1861–1896), known as Dr. Henry Howard Holmes, American serial killer

== See also ==
- Harry Holmes (disambiguation)
- Henry Holmes Smith (1909–1986), photographer
