= Harold Holmes =

Harold Holmes may refer to:

- Harold Holmes (boxer), British boxer in the 1908 Summer Olympics
- Harold Holmes (rugby league), Australian rugby league player
- Harold Holmes, architect of Ankeny Building
- Harold Holmes, political candidate, see Electoral results for the Division of Bass

== See also ==
- Harold Holmes Library, University of the Witwatersrand
- Harry Holmes (disambiguation)
- Hal Holmes (1902–1977), U.S. Representative from Washington
- "Archbishop Harold Holmes", a 2024 song by Jack White from the album No Name
