= Peter Holm =

Peter Holm may refer to:

- Peter Holm (singer) (born 1947), Swedish pop singer and playboy
- Peter Holm (museum director) (1873–1950), Danish museum director and curator
- Peter Holm (politician) (1733–1817), government official and topographical writer in Denmark-Norway
- Peter R. Holm (born 1931), Norwegian poet, author and translator
- Peter Rabe Holm (1751–1824), Danish wine merchant, brewer and director of the Danish Asiatic Company
