= Anthony Holmes =

British author and expert in the turnaround and business recovery field

Anthony Holmes is a British author and active expert in the turnaround and business recovery field.

== Biography ==
Holmes' books include Complex Infrastructure Projects and Managing Through Turbulent Times (ISBN 978-1-906659-11-0). Holmes is best known for his arguments and published works on the inherent difference between leaders and managers and why managers at the top of large organisations are unlikely to ever become true leaders. The themes "leadership cannot be taught" and "how leaders should behave in crises" are recurrent in all of Holmes' published works and public appearances.

Holmes is a regular lecturer and contributor to many UK business publications seeking authority on corporate behaviour in recession. He was cited in the Financial Times "Road to Recovery" report on recovery from recession, The Sunday Times, Management Today, The Director (Institute of Directors), and Financial World.

Holmes' comments on complex infrastructure projects focus on the systematic errors made in the evaluation of benefits and costs.

After a career in investment banking and corporate management, Holmes has recently focused on how and why large, complex infrastructure becomes impaired. He is also co-founder of the Institute for Infrastructure Studies think tank.

== Published works ==
- Holmes, Anthony (1 October 2014). Complex Infrastructure Projects: A Critical Perspective. Harriman House. ISBN 9780857194442.
