= Journal of Applied Polymer Science =

- Discipline: Polymer science
- Language: English
- Edited by: Stefan Spiegel

Publication details
- History: 1959-present
- Publisher: John Wiley & Sons
- Frequency: Bimonthly
- Impact factor: 3.125 (2020)

Standard abbreviations
- ISO 4: J. Appl. Polym. Sci.

Indexing
- ISSN: 0021-8995 (print); 1097-4628 (web)

Links
- Journal homepage; Online access; Online archive

The Journal of Applied Polymer Science is a peer-reviewed scientific journal covering polymer science. The journal covers all applications of synthetic and renewably sourced polymers, including batteries and fuel cells, organic electronics, biomedical implants and drug delivery, coatings and packaging. It also covers composites, blends, elastomers, films and membranes, fibers, emulsions and latices, degradation of polymers, block co-polymers, hydrogels, foams, nanostructured polymers, as well as innovative synthesis and processing techniques. According to the Journal Citation Reports, the journal has a 2020 impact factor of 3.125.
