= Chris Holmes =

Chris Holmes may refer to:

== Music ==
- Chris Holmes (DJ), American DJ, musician, and producer
- Chris Holmes (guitarist) (born 1958), American musician and member of the band W.A.S.P.
- Chris Holmes, British keyboard player, member of Timebox and Babe Ruth
- Chris Holmes, producer of the Megan Slankard album Freaky Little Story
- Chris Holmes, pseudonym of radio DJ Chris Moyles whilst at Radio Luxembourg

== Other ==
- Chris Holmes, Baron Holmes of Richmond, British Paralympian swimmer and peer
- Chris Holmes (mathematician), British statistician
- Christian R. Holmes Jr. (1896–1943), American soldier and zoo owner

== See also ==
- Kris Holmes (born 1950), type designer
