= William Holmes =

William, Bill, or Billy Holmes may refer to:

== Sports ==
- Bill Holmes (ice hockey) (William Orser Holmes, 1899–1961), Canadian ice hockey player
- Bill Holmes (footballer, born 1926) (1926–2020), English footballer
- Billy Holmes (footballer, born 1875) (1875–1922), English footballer with Manchester City who became manager of Clapton Orient
- Billy Holmes (footballer, born 1951) (1951–1988), English footballer with Hereford United, Wimbledon and other clubs
- Billy Holmes (Australian footballer) (1890–1942), Australian footballer for Collingwood and Fitzroy
- William Holmes (English cricketer) (1885–1951), English cricketer
- William Holmes (New Zealand cricketer) (1849-1885), New Zealand cricketer
- William Holmes (cyclist) (born 1936), British Olympic cyclist
- William Holmes (footballer) (1889–1933), footballer who played for Stoke
- Wil Holmes (born 2006), Australian cyclist

== Politicians ==
- Bill Holmes (trade unionist) (1873–1961), British Labour Party politician and trade unionist
- William Holmes (politician) (1779–1851), British Tory politician

== Military ==
- William Holmes (Australian general) (1862–1917), Australian Major General of World War I
- Sir William Holmes (British Army officer, born 1892) (1892–1969), British Lieutenant General of World War II
- William Edgar Holmes (1895–1918), English recipient of the Victoria Cross
- William Holmes (British Army medical officer) (1762–1834), Surgeon-General to the British Forces in Canada
- William Norman Holmes (1896–?), World War I flying ace
- William T. Holmes (1846–1916), Union Army soldier in the American Civil War and Medal of Honor recipient

== Others ==
- William Holmes (academic) (1689–1768), vice-chancellor of Oxford University 1732–1735
- William Holmes (actor), American actor
- William Holmes, anarchist writer and husband of Lizzie Holmes
- William Holmes (film editor) (1904–1978), American film editor
- William Hardy Holmes (1873–1951), Anglican bishop
- William Henry Holmes (1846–1933), American anthropologist
- William Henry Holmes (musician) (1812–1885), English musician
- William E. Holmes (1856–1931), Baptist minister and educator
- William Anthony Holmes (1782–1843), Irish clergyman
- William Trumbull Holmes, American minister and college president

== See also ==
- William à Court-Holmes, 2nd Baron Heytesbury (1809–1891), British peer and Conservative MP
- Wil Holmes (born 2006), Australian cyclist
