= Keith Holmes (palaeobotanist) =

Australian paleobotanist

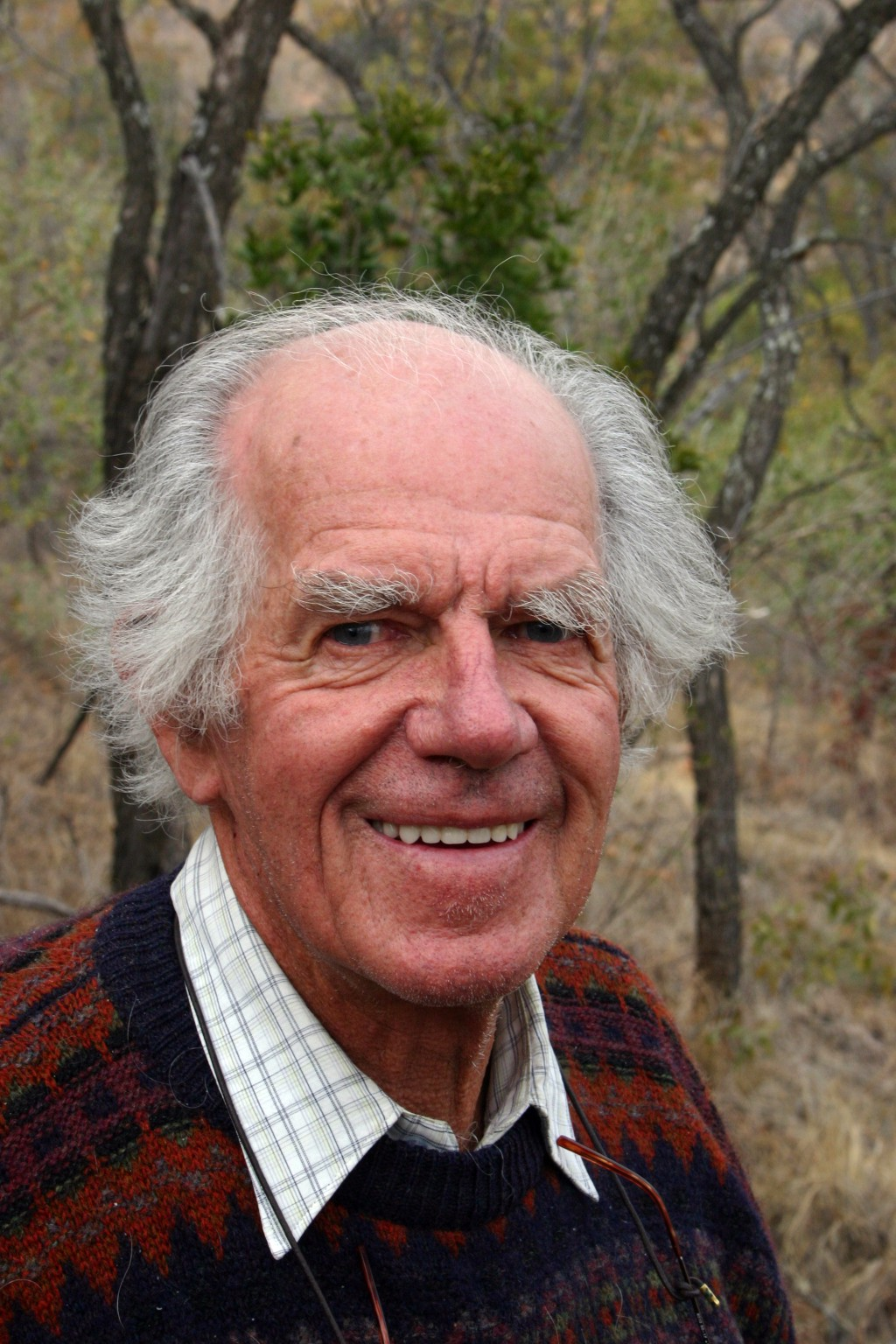

William Brian Keith Holmes is an Australian palaeobotanist, best known for his work "Fructifications of Glossopteris" (1974), published in the Proceedings of the Linnean Society of New South Wales. Despite having received no formal training in palaeontology, he has become an important contributor in the field and has described some 80 new species, mostly from 2 quarries at Nymboida in northern New South Wales, and situated on the Triassic.

== Biography ==
Born 5 March 1933 in Penrith, Australia, the second of four children of William Henry Maitland Holmes, a farmer from Berowra, and Ethel Vea Jay from Bellingen, Keith Holmes started his schooling at Berowra Primary School where he fell under the influence of a Mr. Dawson who instilled in him a lasting interest in natural history. At Homebush Boys High School he was inspired by the principal, Dr. Watson, who had been to Antarctica as a geologist. On leaving high school he joined the CSIRO for a year and attended night school courses in chemistry at the University of Technology in Sydney. From here he joined the family dairy farm at Berowra and moved with it to Raleigh, New South Wales in 1952. In 1958 he went to the United States and visited Maryland and Minnesota under the Young Farmers Exchange program.

From the 1960s Holmes had been collecting fossils from every site in Australia that he had been able to access, and particularly Glossopteris specimens from the Dunedoo formation in the western part of the Sydney Basin. When his farming operations moved to Wellington in New South Wales to start a beef herd of Aberdeen Angus cattle, he finally managed to put together his first paper for publication. The South African palaeobotanist, Dr. Edna P. Plumstead of the Bernard Price Institute for Palaeontological Research, who had focused world attention on the glossopterids of the Permian and Triassic as supporting evidence for continental drift, acted as referee for this first paper - Holmes had met Dr. Plumstead at the Conference on Stratigraphy and Palaeontology in Canberra in I973.

In 1980 Holmes became an Honorary Research Fellow in the Geology Department of the University of New England in Armidale and worked on the taxonomy of the Middle Triassic Nymboida Flora. His collection of approximately 3 000 specimens, supplemented by those of Gould, Flint and Retallack, is one of the most comprehensive Gondwanan Triassic floras, and is preserved in the Australian Museum. Parts 1-7 of the Nymboida Flora have been published, as well as papers dealing with early eucalypts from the Cenozoic, cycads and conifers. Holmes enjoyed close relationships with the Australian Museum and his mentor, the former director, Dr. A.B. Walkom, as well as Dr. Rod Gould of the University of New England.

After his wife's death in 1998, Holmes left the management of his farming operations to his daughter 'Netta' and started visiting palaeobotany centres all over the world. In 2005 he was elected Fellow of the Linnean Society of New South Wales. He is an active member of Rotary International and staunch conservationist, having been delegate to the Nature Conservation Council of New South Wales. He was chairman of the Burrendong Arboretum Trust from 1985 to 1995, as well as chairman of the Mount Arthur Reserve Trust near Wellington.

== Family ==
Keith Holmes married Felicity Gowing (1930-1998) from Kempsey, New South Wales in 1959, and they had 2 daughters, 'Marnie' Heather Marion born 1962, and 'Netta' Eileen Annette born 1964. He married fellow palaeobotanist Heidi Schwyzer from South Africa in Pretoria in 2002.

== Publications ==
- 1966 – Some New South Wales terrestrial orchids of the swamps and damp places. Australian Plants, 4(29), 27-28.
- 1969 – (with F. Holmes) The Pterostylis genus on the mid-north coast of NSW. Australian Plants. 5(41), 219-220.
- 1973 – Notes on Epipogium roseum (D. Don) Lindl. Orchadian, 4(5).
- 1974 – On some Fructifications of the Glossopteridales from the Upper Permian of N.S.W. Proc. Linn. Soc. NSW. 98(3), 132-141.
- 1977 – A pinnate leaf with reticulate venation from the Permian of N.S.W. Proc. Linn . Soc. NSW. 102(2), 52-57.
- 1979 – (with Ash S.R.) An Early Triassic Megafossil Flora from the Lorne Basin, N.S.W. Proc. Linn . Soc. NSW. 103(1), 47-70.
- 1981 – A New Leaf, Glossopteris duocaudata sp. nov. from the Late Permian of Cooyal, NSW. The Palaeobotanist. 28-29, 46-52.
- 1981 – The present day vegetation of south-east Queensland and northern and central NSW. X111 Int. Bot. Congress Field Trip 36, 2-3.
- 1981 – Trip notes for the Lismore to Sydney section of the Palaeobotany and Palynology Field Excursion. X11 Int. Bot. Congress Field Trip. 36, 7-20.
- 1982 – The Middle Triassic flora from Benolong, near Dubbo, central-western NSW. Alcheringa, 6,-1-33. 1982 –(Webb, J.A. and Holmes, W.B.K.) Three new thalloid plants from the Middle Triassic of eastern Australia. Proc. Roy. Soc. Queensland. 93, 83-88.
- 1983 – (with Holmes, F.M. and Martin, H.A.) Fossil Eucalyptus remains from the Middle Miocene Chalk Mountain Formation, Warrumbungle Mountains, NSW. Proc. Linn. Soc. NSW. 106(4), 299-310.
- 1984 – Geology – in The Dubbo Region – A Natural History. Field Naturalist Club, Dubbo. pp 6–16.
- 1987 – New Corystosperm Ovulate Fructifications from the Middle Triassic of Eastern Australia. Alcheringa, 11, 165-173.
- 1990 – Austroglossa walkomii Holmes, a glossopterid ovulate fructification from the Late Permian of New South Wales. Proc. 3IOP Conference, Melbourne 1988, 67-73.
- 1990 – (with Pickett, J. et al.) A stratigraphic evaluation of Ettinghausen’s New England Tertiary plant localities. Austr. Jl. Earth Sciences. 37, 293-303.
- 1991 – Glossopteris – low diversity, high productivity. 4th IOP Conference, Paris.39 (Abstract)
- 1991 – Burdekinia multiseptata gen.et sp. nov..an unusual fossil plant from the late Carboniferous of New South Wales. 8th International Symposium on Gondwana. 44 (Abstract).
- 1992 – (with Holmes, F.M.) Fossil flowers of Ceratopetalum Sm. (Family Cunoniaceae) from the Tertiary of eastern Australia. Proc. Linn. Soc. NSW. 113(4), 265-270.
- 1992 – Glossopteris-like leaves from the Triassic of eastern Australia. Proc “Birbal Sahni Birth Centenary Palaeobotanical Conference” Geophytology, 22, 119-125.
- 1993 – The Wattle Walk – Burrendong Arboretum. 8pp.
- 1994 – Bobborah Wallah Track – Burrendong Arboretum. 8pp.
- 1995 – A Late Permian flora from Cooyal, central-western N.S.W. Proc. Birbal Sahni Centenary Conference, Lucknow 1991, 123-152.
- 1996 – Ginkgo biloba, the last of an illustrious line. The fossil record of the Ginkgoales, with special reference to Gondwana occurrences. International Dendrology Society Year Book, 1995, 38-43.
- 1996 – A fossil plant organ with unusual internal structure from the late Carboniferous of N.S.W. Alcheringa, 20, 69-72.
- 1997 – Southern record for Rhinerrhiza divitiflora. The Orchadian, 12(3), 107.
- 1997 - From go to woe – The Triassic vegetation of eastern Australia. Palaeobiogeography of Australasian Floras.48, 39, (abstract)
- 2000 – The Middle Triassic Megafossil Flora of the Basin Creek Formation, Nymboida Coal Measures, NSW, Australia. Part 1; Bryophyta, Sphenophyta. Proc. Linn. Soc. NSW. 122, 43-68.
- 2000 – Equisetalean Plant Remains from the Early to Middle Triassic of New South Wales, Australia. Records of the Australian Museum. 53, 9-20.
- 2001 - The Middle Triassic Megafossil Flora of the Basin Creek Formation, Nymboida Coal Measures, NSW, Australia. Part 2; Filicophyta. Proc. Linn. Soc. NSW. 123, 39-87.
- 2003 - The Middle Triassic Megafossil Flora of the Basin Creek Formation, Nymboida Coal Measures, NSW, Australia. Part 3; Fern-like Foliage. Proc. Linn. Soc. NSW. 124, 53-108.
- 2005 - (with Anderson, H.M.) The Middle Triassic Megafossil Flora of the Basin Creek Formation, Nymboida Coal Measures, NSW, Australia. Part 4; Umkomasiaceae. Dicroidium and Affiliated Fructifications. Proc. Linn. Soc. NSW. 126, 1-37.
- 2005 - (with Anderson, H.M.) The Middle Triassic Megafossil Flora of the Basin Creek Formation, Nymboida Coal Measures, NSW, Australia. Part 5; The Genera Lepidopteris, Kurtziana, Rochipteris and Walkomiopteris. Proc. Linn. Soc. NSW. 126, 39-79.
- 2007 - (with Anderson, H.M.) The Middle Triassic Megafossil Flora of the Basin Creek Formation, Nymboida Coal Measures, NSW, Australia. Part 6. Ginkgophyta. Proc. Linn. Soc. NSW. 128, 155-200
- 2008 - (with Anderson, H.M.) The Middle Triassic Megafossil Flora of the Basin Creek Formation, Nymboida Coal Measures, NSW, Australia. Part 7. Cycadophyta. Proc. Linn. Soc. NSW. 129, 113–149.
- 2008 - (with Anderson, H.M. and Fitness, L.A.) Stems with attached Dicroidium leaves from the Ipswich Coal Measures, Queensland, Australia. Memoirs of the Queensland Museum, 52, 1–12.
- 2010 - (with Anderson, H.M.) The Middle Triassic Megafossil Flora of the Basin Creek Formation, Nymboida Coal Measures, NSW, Australia. Part 8. The Genera Nilssonia, Taeniopteris, Linguifolium, Gontriglossa and Scoresbya.. Proc. Linn. Soc. NSW. 131, 1–26.
- 2013 - (with Anderson, H.M.) A synthesis of the rich Gondwana Triassic megafossil flora from Nymboida, Australia. In Tanner, L.H., Spielmann, J.A. and Lucas, S.G. eds 2013 - The Triassic System. New Mexico Museum of Natural History and Science, Bulletin 61, 296 - 305.
- 2013 - (with Anderson, H.M.) The Middle Triassic Megafossil flora of the Basin Creek Formation, Nymboida Coal Measures, New South Wales, Australia. Part 9. The genera Heidiphyllum, Voltziopsis, Rissikia and affiliated cones, and ? Yabiella. Proc. Linn. Soc. NSW. 135, 55 - 76.
