= Josh Holmes (boxer) =

English boxer (born 1995)

Personal information
- Nationality: English
- Born: 6 July 1995 (age 31)
- Weight: Super-featherweight

Boxing career
- Stance: Orthodox

Boxing record
- Total fights: 18
- Wins: 18
- Win by KO: 7

Josh Holmes (born 6 July 1995) is an English professional boxer. He held the English super-featherweight title in 2024.

== Career ==
Holmes made his professional debut at King George's Hall in Blackburn on 30 March 2019, winning a four-round contest against Naheem Chaudhry on points in a fight which saw him knock his opponent to the canvas during the first round.

After a stop-start career that was hampered by two hand surgeries and a failed brain scan, he won his first pro-title by claiming the vacant English super-featherweight championship with a fourth round stoppage success over Lewis Wood at Bowlers Exhibition Centre in Manchester on 16 November 2024. Holmes vacated the title without making any defenses.

He faced Alex Murphy at Co-op Live Arena in Manchester on 28 March 2026. After he knocked his opponent to the canvas for a second time in the first round the referee stopped the contest and awarded Holmes the win via technical knockout.

== Personal life ==
Away from the boxing ring, Holmes works as a personal trainer with actor Johnny Depp among his clients.
