= Donald Grahame Holmes =

Australian electrical engineer

Donald Grahame Holmes is an electrical engineer at the Royal Melbourne Institute of Technology in Melbourne, Australia. He was named a Fellow of the Institute of Electrical and Electronics Engineers (IEEE) in 2013 for his contributions to the modulation and control of solid-state power electronic conversion equipment.
