= Thomas Holm =

Thomas Holm may refer to:

- Thomas Holm (footballer) (born 1981), Norwegian footballer
- Thomas Holm (musician) (born 1978), Danish singer-songwriter
- Tom Holm, professor of Native-American studies

== See also ==
- Thomas Heebøll-Holm, medieval historian
- Thomas Holme (disambiguation)
