= William Edgar Holmes =

Recipient of the Victoria Cross

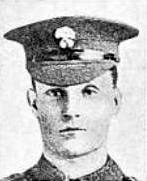
- Born: 26 June 1895; Wood Stanway, Gloucestershire, England
- Died: 9 October 1918 (aged 23) †; Cattenières, France
- Burial place: Carnieres Communal Cemetery Extension, France
- Military career
- Allegiance: United Kingdom
- Branch: British Army
- Service years: 1913–1918
- Rank: Private
- Service number: 16796
- Units: Gloucestershire Regiment; Grenadier Guards
- Conflicts: First World War: Battle of Mons; First Battle of Ypres; Winter operations 1914–1915 (WIA); Battle of Loos; Battle of the Somme; Battle of Cambrai; Battle of Arras; Hundred Days Offensive †
- Awards: Victoria Cross

Private William Edgar Holmes VC (26 June 1895 − 9 October 1918) was a British Army soldier and an English recipient of the Victoria Cross (VC), the highest and most prestigious award for gallantry in the face of the enemy that can be awarded to British and Commonwealth forces. A soldier with the Grenadier Guards during the First World War, he was posthumously awarded the VC for his actions on 9 October 1918, during the Hundred Days Offensive.

== Early life ==
Born on 26 June 1895 in the village of Wood Stanway, in Gloucestershire, William Edgar Holmes was the son of a timber worker, Edward Holmes, who worked on the Stanway Estate, and his wife Ellen Holmes née Stanley. He was educated at Church Stanway and on completing his schooling, he joined his father in working on the Stanway Estate.

In July 1913, Holmes enlisted in the Gloucestershire Regiment of the British Army. Before the year was out, he transferred to the Grenadier Guards and was posted to its 2nd Battalion.

== First World War ==
On the outbreak of the First World War in August 1914, Holmes' battalion was part of the British Expeditionary Force (BEF) sent to France. He saw action in the Battle of Mons and at the First Battle of Ypres. After suffering frostbite in the winter of 1914, he was medically evacuated to England for treatment; this saw two toes being amputated.

Holmes returned to his unit in 1915. As part of the Guards Division, the battalion was engaged in several battles on the Western Front, including the Battles of Loos, the Somme, Cambrai, and Arras. In the final stages of the war, it advanced against the Hindenburg Line.

On 9 October 1918, Holmes' battalion was advancing towards the villages of Cattenières and Estourmel when it was held up by machine-gun fire. While under heavy fire, Holmes retrieved two wounded men. While assisting a third wounded soldier he himself was wounded. He remained in the frontlines until he was shot in the throat and died of his wounds. Cattenières was captured the following day. For his actions of 9 October, Holmes was awarded the Victoria Cross (VC). The VC, instituted in 1856, was the highest award for valour that could be bestowed on a soldier of the British Empire. The citation for Holmes' VC read:

For most conspicuous bravery and devotion to duty at Cattenieres on the 9th October, 1918. Pte. Holmes carried in two men under the most intense fire, and, while he was attending to a third case, he was severely wounded. In spite of this, he continued to carry wounded, and was shortly afterwards again wounded, with fatal results. By his self-sacrifice and disregard of danger he was the means of saving the lives of several of his comrades.

— London Gazette, 24 December 1918

Holmes is buried at Carnieres Communal Cemetery Extension, a cemetery administered by the Commonwealth War Graves Commission, in Carnieres, to the east of Cambrai.

== Victoria Cross ==
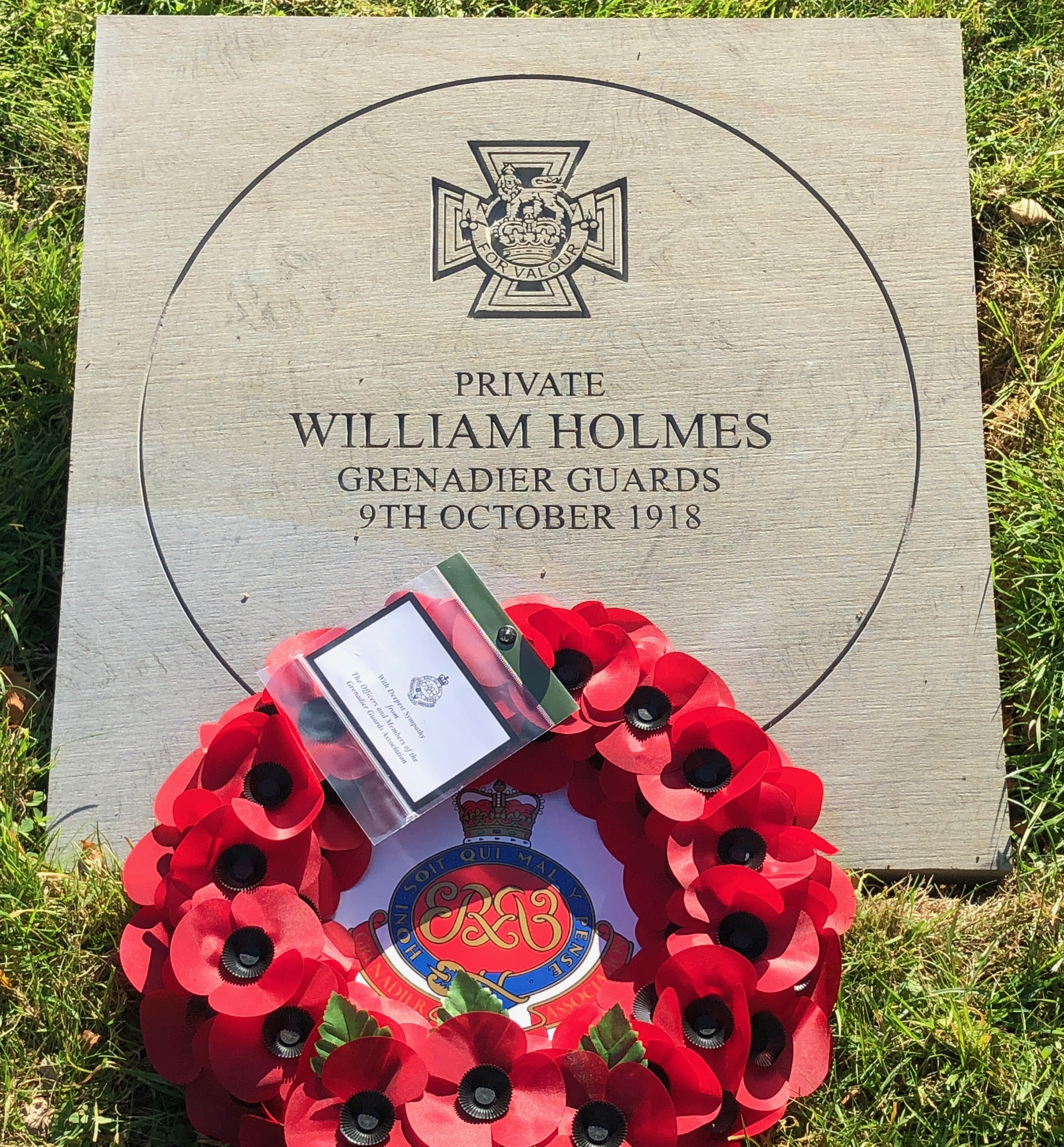
Holmes' VC Stone at St George's Church, Didbrook

King George V presented Holmes' VC to his parents on 29 March 1919, in a ceremony at Buckingham Palace. He was also entitled to the 1914 Star with clasp, the British War Medal, and the Victory Medal. His medals were donated to the Grenadier Guards in 1959 and are displayed at The Guards Museum, located at Wellington Barracks in London.

On 9 October 2018, the centenary of Holmes' death, the Lord-Lieutenant of Gloucester, Dame Janet Trotter, unveiled a VC Stone to honour Holmes at St George's Church, in Didbrook, Gloucestershire. His name is recorded on the Roll of Honour inside the church.

== Bibliography ==
- Ashcroft, Michael (2007) [2006]. Victoria Cross Heroes. Headline Review. ISBN 978-0-7553-1633-5.
- Fraser, David (1998) [1978]. The Grenadier Guards. Men-at-Arms Series. Vol. 78. Osprey Publishing. ISBN 0-85045-284-8.
- Gliddon, Gerald (2014) [2000]. The Final Days 1918. VCs of the First World War. The History Press. ISBN 978-0-7509-5368-9.
