= List of Filipino Canadians =

This is a list of Filipino Canadians who have made significant contributions to Canadian culture, politics, or society. It also includes those with notable mentions in Canadian media.

== Academia ==
- Joselito (Lito) M. Arocena – soil scientist, Canada Research Chair in Soil and Environmental Sciences, University of Northern British Columbia, Prince George, BC
- Michael Batu - Associate Professor of Economics at the University of the Fraser Valley
- Glenda Bonifacio- Professor of Women's Studies and Dean of the Faculty of Social Sciences and Humanities at Lakehead University
- Herbert Gaisano – Professor and Researcher at the University of Toronto's Faculty of Medicine and Gastroenterologists
- Jessica Trisko-Darden – activist, former model, beauty queen and assistant professor of international development and conflict at American University's School of International Service
- Ann Makosinski – student inventor and public speaker
- Romulo F. Magsino Sr. – former Dean of Education at a major university in Canada
- Rogemar Mamon – mathematician, professor at the University of Western Ontario
- Ana Serrano-artist, Dean of the Ontario College of Art and Design University
- Eleanor Ty – professor in the department of English and film studies at Wilfrid Laurier University.

== Arts and letters ==
=== Dance ===
- AC Bonifacio – dancer/female member of Lucky Aces
- Maribeth Manalaysay Tabanera aka Kilusan – artist, abolitionist educator and community organizer
- Alvin Erasga Tolentino – choreographer and dance artist

=== Graphic arts ===
- Adrian Alphona – comic book artist
- Mike del Mundo – comic book artist
- Francis Manapul – comic book artist and writer
- Francisco Reyes – illustrator and comic strip artist
- Leanne Shapton – artist, art director, illustrator, and publisher

=== Visual arts ===
- Stephanie Comilang – artist and filmmaker
- Lani Maestro
- Sofronio Y. Mendoza, aka by his monogram SYM – painter
- Marigold Santos – inter-disciplinary artist

=== Journalism ===
- Ruben Cusipag – founder of Toronto-based Balita newspaper.
- Melissa Grelo – co-host of CP24 Breakfast and the moderator of The Social
- Hazel Mae – sportscaster and anchor Rogers Sportsnet
- Cherie Mercado – journalist, host and producer Filipino TV
- Rhea Santos – journalist, presenter OMNI News

=== Literature ===
- Jennilee Austria-Bonifacio – author
- Albert Casuga – writer
- Petronila Cleto – writer and activist
- Edmundo Farolan – writer
- C. E. Gatchalian – playwright, poet
- Catherine Hernandez – novelist, children's book writer, playwright
- Marc Perez – poet
- Jhet van Ruyven – writer
- Alexis Tioseco – film critic
- Jia Tolentino – writer and editor
- J. Torres – comic book writer

=== Theater ===
- Rogelio Balagtas – actor
- Esteban Comilang – actor
- Ma-Anne Dionisio – actress

== Business ==
- Victor Cui – CEO and owner of the MMA promotion ONE FC
- Dominic Penaloza – CEO & founder of Ushi and WorldFriends

== Fashion and pageantry ==
=== Pageants ===
- Karla Henry – Miss Earth 2008
- Bea Santiago – Miss International 2013
- Riza Santos – Miss Earth Canada 2006, Miss World Canada 2011 and Miss Universe Canada 2013
- Tisha Silang – former Bb. Pilipinas-Universe; beauty queen; TV host; entrepreneur
- Jessica Trisko – Miss Earth 2007, academic, activist, beauty queen, and former model

== Labour ==
- Juliet Cuenco – rights activist, public servant
- Columbia 'Coco' Diaz – program manager for Intercede, an Ontario advocacy group for domestic workers
- Don Garcia – ILWU Canada president
- Virginia Guiang-Santoro – founder of Filipino Domestic Workers Association of Manitoba
- Ging Hernandez – advocate for domestic care workers and women's rights activist
- Juana Tejada – caregiver who campaigned for overseas Filipino workers' (OFW) and immigrants' rights in Canada
- Pura Velasco – advocate for caregivers
- Fely Villasin – advocate for domestic workers, caregivers and new immigrants, founder/artistic director of Carlos Bulosan Theatre

== Health Science ==
- Eileen de Villa – Medical Officer of Health for the City of Toronto
- Gigi Osler – president of the Canadian Medical Association

== Politics ==
- Cris Aglugub – Manitoba former NDP MLA, the Maples (1999–2007), former Legislative Assistant to the Minister of Labour and Immigration, and subsequently to the Minister of Intergovernmental Affairs and Trade.
- Carl Benito – former MLA for Edmonton-Mill Woods (2008–2012)
- Lisa Bower – Councillor for Town of Ajax, Ontario (2018–present).
- Yvonne Clarke – first Filipina MLA (Portercreek 2021–present) in the Yukon Legislative Assembly
- Jelynn Dela Cruz – Member of the Manitoba Legislative Assembly for Radisson
- Narima dela Cruz – community organizer
- Mable Elmore – first Filipina-Canadian MLA in BC (NDP) (2009–present), current Parliamentary Secretary for Seniors’ Services and Long-Term Care (2020–present), former Parliamentary Secretary for Poverty Reduction of British Columbia (2017–2020), former Spokesperson for Temporary Foreign Workers and Immigration and former the Deputy Spokesperson for Finance
- Tobias C. Enverga – first Filipino-Canadian Senator (Conservative); first Filipino-Canadian elected to the City of Toronto in 2010 (to the Toronto Catholic District School Board as trustee)
- Taciana Jew – first Filipino citizenship judge in Ontario
- Flor Marcelino – first Filipino woman and racialized woman elected MLA in Manitoba (2007–2019), former Leader of the Opposition (2016–2017), Minister of Multiculturalism and Literacy (2013–2016), and Minister of Culture, Heritage, and Tourism (2009–2013)
- Malaya Marcelino – MLA in Manitoba- Notre Dame (2019)
- Ted Marcelino – former MLA in Manitoba, first MLA for the electoral district of Tyndall Park (2011–2019)
- Rey Pagtakhan – first Filipino-Canadian Member of Parliament (1988–2004), first Filipino-Canadian Cabinet Minister (2001–2004), former Minister of Western Economic Diversification(2003–2004),Minister of Veterans Affairs (2002–2003), Senior Minister for Manitoba (2002–2004),Secretary of State (Science, Research and Development) (2002–2003), and Secretary of State (Asia-Pacific) (2001–2002).
- Jon Reyes – Conservative MLA (St. Norbert 2016–2019, Waverley 2019–present) and Minister of Economic Development and Jobs in Manitoba (2020–present), former special envoy for military affairs
- Conrad Santos – first Filipino Canadian elected in Canada (elected as MLA in Manitoba (1981–1988, 1990–2007), and first Filipino Canadian to run for the leadership of a political party (Manitoba NDP, 1989)
- Rowena Santos – first Filipino councillor in City of Brampton, Vice Chair of Audit and Risk, and Chair of Community Services (2018–present)
- Rechie Valdez – first Filipina woman elected MP, current MP for Mississauga-Streetsville, first Filipina-Canadian Cabinet Minister
- Tany Yao – Conservative MLA in Alberta in the riding of Fort McMurray-Wood Buffalo (2015)

== Sports ==
- Sean Anthony – professional basketball player for the Phoenix Super LPG Fuel Masters
- Eve Badana – football goalkeeper
- Matthew Baldisimo – midfielder for Pacific FC
- Michael Baldisimo – soccer player for Vancouver Whitecaps FC
- Jonathan de Guzmán – midfielder for Feyenoord Rotterdam
- Julian de Guzman – soccer coach and former professional player
- Edrian Paul Celestino – figure skater
- David Choinière – soccer player
- Mathieu Choinière – soccer player
- Kadin Chung – soccer player for Pacific FC
- Camille Clarin – basketball player for the Philippines women's national basketball team
- Aidan Daniels – midfielder for Colorado Springs Switchbacks
- Crispin Duenas – Olympic archer
- Mathew Dumba – professional hockey player (NHL)
- Leylah Annie Fernandez – tennis player
- Bianca Fernandez – tennis player
- Rey Fortaleza – Olympic boxer
- James Forrester – professional basketball player
- Gilmore Junio – Winter Olympics long track speed skater
- A. J. Mandani – former PBA & ABL basketball player
- Patrick Metcalfe – soccer player for Vancouver Whitecaps FC
- Nick O'Donnell – soccer player for Philippines national football team in 2014
- Alex Pagulayan – 2004 world pool champion
- Victoria Pickett – professional soccer player
- Kharis Ralph – former ice dancer
- Rebecca Rivera – professional volleyball player
- Kayla Sanchez – Olympic swimmer
- Jaclyn Sawicki – footballer for Philippines women's national football team
- Devin Shore – professional ice hockey player
- Jesse Shugg – international soccer player
- Kat Tolentino – professional volleyball player
- Ernestine Tiamzon – former professional volleyball player
- Norbert Torres – professional basketball player
- Matthew Wright – basketball player for Kyoto Hannaryz, former PBA player

== Television and film ==
=== Television ===
- Susan Aceron – actress
- Chasty Ballesteros – actress
- Eric Bauza – voice actor, stand-up comedian and animation artist
- Carlos Bustamante (TV personality) – television host, actor and voice actor
- Gelli De Belen - actress
- Nancy Castiglione – actress and singer; actress on Sana Ay Ikaw Na Nga
- Chelsea Clark – actress
- Gordon Cormier – actor
- Lexa Doig – actress
- Patrick Guzman – actor
- Manny Jacinto – film and television actor
- Josette Jorge – actress
- Ron Josol – actor and stand-up comedian
- Amanda Joy – actress, screenwriter, comedian, satirist, and producer
- Mig Macario – actor
- Alex Mallari Jr. – actor
- Shay Mitchell – actress
- Keith Pedro – comedian
- Ann Pornel – comedian, host The Great Canadian Baking Show
- Ariel Rivera – singer-songwriter, multi-platinum recording artist, actor
- Kayla Rivera – actress
- Jeff Rustia – television host and VJ
- Gervacio Santos – film editor
- Michael Sager – actor
- Cassie Steele – actress
- Veena Sud – television writer, director, and producer
- Cheryl Torrenueva – designer
- Louriza Tronco – actress and singer
- Lisa Marcos – actress
- Beverly Vergel – actress and film writer, director and producer
- Jessalyn Wanlim – actress and model

=== Reality show ===
- Celeste Anderson – competitive gamer and reality television personality
- Mikey Bustos – Canadian Idol finalist; singer from Toronto
- Erika Casupanan – Survivor 41; first Canadian to win
- Darren Espanto – The Voice Kids Philippines season one runner-up, singer, recording artist
- Elise Estrada – singer; recording artist; Pinoy Pop Superstar finalist
- Elena Juatco – Canadian Idol finalist; roving reporter for season 4 of Canadian Idol
- John Alvarez – Chef, Chopped Canada chef contestant
- Kyne Santos – Drag performer; Canada's Drag Race Season 1 contestant
- Kimmy Couture – Drag performer; Canada's Drag Race Season 3 contestant
- Melinda Verga – Drag performer; Canada's Drag Race Season 4 contestant
- Kiki Coe – Drag performer; Canada's Drag Race Season 4 contestant

=== Film ===
- Kim Albright – filmmaker
- Paul Denham Austerberry – production designer
- Rogelio Balagtas – actor
- Enrique Miguel Baniqued – producer
- Romeo Candido – filmmaker
- Tirso Cruz III – actor, comedian, and singer
- Seán Devlin – filmmaker and comedian
- Liam Diaz – actor
- Gelli de Belen - actress
- Martin Edralin – filmmaker
- Von Flores – actor
- Marco Grazzini – film and television actor
- Haji – actress
- Kathleen Jayme – filmmaker
- Mig Macario – actor; filmmaker
- Isiah Medina – filmmaker
- Marianne Métivier – filmmaker
- Serville Poblete – filmmaker
- Ellie Posadas – actress
- Gervacio Santos – film editor
- Ian Tuason - filmmaker

== Internet ==
- Sabrina Cruz – YouTube personality
- Elle Mills – YouTuber
- Domics – animator
- Kariza Santos - YouTuber, better known as Life of Riza

== Disc jockeys ==
- Mark Anthony – co-launched the web-based music label Dark Panties Recordings

== Music ==
- Joey Albert – recording artist
- Jeremie Albino – singer
- Maria Aragon – singer
- Eleanor Calbes – soprano
- Elise Estrada – singer
- Warren Dean Flandez – R&B and gospel singer
- Emmalyn Estrada – singer, songwriter
- Carolyn Fe – jazz and blues artist
- Carlo Gimenez – guitarist of the band Meg & Dia
- Emm Gryner – singer/songwriter
- Manila Grey - (stylized as MANILA GREY), R&B duo
- Martha Joy – singer, recording artist
- MICO - alt-pop and pop-punk singer, songwriter
- Killy – rapper
- Kimmortal – musician, songwriter and visual artist
- Kytami – musician
- Casey Mecija and Jennifer Mecija – musicians from the band Ohbijou
- Pressa — rapper
- Preston Pablo – Breakthrough Artist of the Year, Juno Awards 2023
- August Rigo – recording artist, songwriter, producer and musician
- Alcvin Ramos – composer
- Maylee Todd – indie pop singer

== Other ==
- Benson Flores – first known Filipino immigrant to Canada on record
- Christina Calayca – daycare worker who mysteriously disappeared on a camping trip in August 2007
- Erik Mana – professional magician and mentalist
- Jeff Rustia – executive director & founder of Toronto Men's Fashion Week
- Japoy Lizardo – former taekwondo athlete
- Wiliam B. Norrie – chancellor of University of Manitoba
- Henry Omaga Diaz – YouTuber, former newscaster journalist
