= Columbia "Coco" Diaz =

Philippine-born activist in Canada (1953–2018)

Columbia Tarape-Diaz
- Born: Columbia Tarape; October 21, 1953; Philippines
- Died: March 23, 2018 (aged 64); Mississauga, Ontario, Canada
- Occupation: activist
- Spouse: Dardo Diaz

Columbia Tarape-Diaz (October 21, 1953 – March 23, 2018) also known as Coco Diaz was a Philippine-born activist. She was an esteemed community organizer for domestic workers and caregivers.

== Biography ==
Columbia Tarape was born on October 21, 1953, in Asingan, Pangasinan, Philippines. She studied at Asingan School of Arts and Trades then pursued social work at the University of Baguio. She immigrated to Canada via Madrid, Spain. Beginning in 1981, she was hired as a domestic worker in Toronto.

Coco Tarape (who subsequently married to be Mrs. Diaz) was a key figure in the formation of a campaign for landed immigrant status for foreign domestics. She was a founding member of the ad hoc committee for landed status for foreign domestic workers. Other core members of the committee were Zeny Dumlao, Ving Domingo and Tessie Rayo. Assisted by Fely Villasin of the International Association of Filipino Patriots, and Ging Hernandez of the Coalition Against the Marcos Dictatorship, it was a short-lived group.

Towards the end of that year, the Canadian federal government introduced the Foreign Domestic Movement (FDM) program. The new policy allowed domestic workers who had been in the country for two years to apply for permanent residency from within Canada. But they had to satisfy first the requirements of "self-sufficiency."

In the 1980s and 1990s, Tarape-Diaz was involved in the steering committee of INTERCEDE, or the International Coalition to End Domestic Exploitation, a Toronto-based lobbying and advocacy group. While membership was open to all domestic workers, it was initially conceived as an alliance of foreign domestic workers and advocates from community, women's and immigrant organizations. In this role she challenged discriminatory immigration policies that impacted domestic workers coming to Canada from the global south.

Given her educational background in social work, she was hired as a settlement counsellor. She was also actively contributed to the group's newsletter "Domestics' Cross-Cultural News" where she wrote her own column. She worked with INTERCEDE (As of 1994, it was renamed Intercede for the Rights of Domestic Workers, Caregivers, and Newcomers) until it folded in 2009 often commenting on local news items related to the lives of domestic workers.

Tarape-Diaz was also a founding member of the Caregiver Connections, Education, and Support Organization (CCESO), a volunteer organization dedicated to educating and supporting newcomers and caregivers. CCESO was founded in 2007 consisting of former Intercede members.

She died on March 23, 2018, at 64 years old.

== See also ==
- Filipino community in Toronto
- List of Filipino Canadians
