= National Council of Canadian-Filipino Associations =

The National Council of Canadian Filipino Associations (NCCFA) (French: Conseil national des associations canadiennes des Philippines) (Filipino: Pambansang Sanggunian ng mga Samahang Kanadiano Pilipino) was an umbrella organization and advocacy group for the Filipino Canadian organizations in Canada. It was officially established in 1983 and registered as a Canadian non-profit organization with headquarters in Ottawa in 1990. It was dissolved in 2015.

== History ==
The immediate predecessor to the NCCFA was the United Council of Filipino Associations in Canada (UCFAC) founded in 1963 by community leaders in Toronto, Montreal and Vancouver. According to the organization's 'historique', "the establishment of a national body for Filipino Canadians was first envisioned by Azucena Dulay, President of the Filipino Association in Canada, of Toronto. She brought together Filipino community leaders from Vancouver, Montreal, and Winnipeg for the purpose of forming a national organization." Membership to UCFAC comprised representation from Filipino associations across Canada.

The UCFAC held conferences since it was founded. In 1965, discussions focused on how to improve links in the communities across Canada. In 1971, the conference announced that "unity and cooperation among Filipino associations and communities can best be achieved through a cohesive and vigorous national association." The 1973 conference took the theme "The Filipino Identity in our Evolving Multicultural Society."

In the early 1980s a distinctively different organization developed in the place of the original one. In 1983, Dr. Rey Pagtakhan called community leaders from around Canada to his home in Winnipeg where they discussed the possibility of a new formation. As former UCFAC National President and Chair of the Canadian Ethno-cultural Council (CEC), Pagtakhan proposed major changes in the organizational structure that followed other CEC groups had and the federal government's Multiculturalism program guide. It also ceased relations with the Philippine Consul General as their official adviser. The new organization also included in its mission 'national unity'. Thus, the UCFAC was revived as the National Council of Canadian Filipino Associations (NCCFA). The NCCFA followed its precursor with similar activities. In 1989, it organized a national dialogue on Filipino domestic workers during the International Women's Day celebrations in Toronto.

Along with 37 national ethnic organizations across Canada, NCCFA was a member organization of the Canadian Ethnocultural Council.

Position	Name	Term
National President	Salvador Cabugao	1990-1994
Regional Vice Presidents
Region I-Newfoundland, Nova Scotia, New Brunswick, PEI	Leticia La Rosa	1990-
Region II-Quebec	Ma. Aurora R. Osdon	1990-1994
Region III-Ontario (other than Greater Toronto)	Jose A. Sotto	
Region IV-Greater Toronto	Carmencita Hernandez	
Region V-Manitoba	Lou Fernandez	
Region VI-Saskatchewan & Northwest Territories	Gerry Gilongos	
Region VII-Alberta	Rhoda S.J. Abada	
Region VII-Alberta	Linda Cantiveros	
Region VII-Alberta	Eric Lazo	
Region VIII-British Columbia & Yukon Territory	Alan T. Decolongon	
National Secretary	Marilen de la Cruz	
National Secretary	Rhoda S.J. Abada	
National Treasurer	Victor L. Nombrado	
Youth Director	Elizabeth Casuga	
Coordinator	Linda S. Baltazar	
Legal Counsel	Emilio S. Binavince	

== See also ==
- Filipino Canadians
