= Filipino domestic helpers in Canada =

Domestic workers from the Philippines living and working in Canada

Filipino domestic workers in Canada are Overseas Filipino Workers who frequently immigrated through the Live-In Caregiver program, which was cancelled to new applicants in 2014. After immigration processes and approval "the Live in Caregiver Program required of participants that they work as a live-in caregiver for two full years before applying for an open visa (at which point they are released from the obligation to do live-in domestic work.)". Many Filipinas found this program attractive because of their need to provide for their families, especially children. One of the main ways to provide for their children is giving them proper education. Highly valuing this, "a larger proportion of the mostly women who have come through these programs have come from the Philippines; by 1996 fully 87 percent came from the Philippines."

After the outbreak of Covid-19, applications and requests for entry were denied by the Canadian Government for mitigation of the COVID Virus.

== Cultural background ==
It is recognized that "domestic service is one of the largest categories of waged work for women in the Philippines; by 1975, one out of five employed women was in domestic service". On the global market "migrant Filipina women [are] employed as domestic workers in more than 130 countries". In conjunction with the rest of the world, gender stereotypes of Filipina women stem from the Philippines itself, with "the ideal Filipino family [consisting] of a male breadwinner and a female housekeeper, and housework and child care are predominantly considered women’s duties". This thus translates back over to the rest of the world with the Western world seeking women as domestic workers and "[creating] a niche for Filipina women in the global labor market".

== Ethnicity ==
Although women may be part of the same occupational group as domestic workers, there are ethnic divisions that grant different attitudes toward them. Filipina domestic workers fall near the bottom of this division. An example would be between Filipinas and Europeans in Canada. Filipinas and Europeans are constructed in different ways in that "Filipinas are constructed as housekeepers, while European women are called nannies". This distinction comes from the fact that Filipino housekeepers (domestic workers) have no title behind them, while European nannies are titled through the Nursery Nurse Examination Board (NNEB).

However, even if Filipina women do not have an NNEB background, many women received degrees through various universities in the Philippines. These women "even go so far as to draw equivalency between a university degree in Canada and one from the Philippines". Thus, these Filipina women have high educational statuses behind them and have every means to be at par with European women who have NNEB status. However, this is not the case as differentiation through ethnicities takes hold again. It seems that "[nanny] agents display an odd forgetfulness about Filipinas’ educations while assigning the NNEB certificate weight and importance".

== Perception ==
Gender and ethnic biases and stereotypes have led to negative perceptions of the Filipina domestic worker. Some perceptions may seem positive, such as those from their employers saying, "they make good immigrants. They’re hard working. And they Canadianize extremely well". Others see them as "respectful" because they "[do] not intrude". They do not overstep their position/speak up and they do not eat a lot of food (227-228, Nurse). However, the underlying position of these views are not positive, as it results in Filipinas being perceived as easy to control, thus making them good employees as domestic workers. This also shows the perception of the Western world viewing themselves as being above them. To corroborate this is the thought that "benefits to the Canadian state and Canadian households are translated into a benefit for the domestic workers". This states that the happiness of the employer ultimately dictates the happiness of the Filipina domestic worker as well. With the perception of Filipinas being more respectful because they do not challenge the employer, employers tend to be more "fond" of them compared to other ethnicities that are more willing to challenge their employers.

Even Filipinos themselves perpetuate the negative perceptions of Filipina domestic workers. As stated in the article, "From Registered Nurse to Register Nanny: Discursive Geographies of Filipina Domestic Workers in Vancouver, B.C.," written by Geraldine Pratt:

Filipinos are sometimes embarrassed by being mistaken as domestic workers when they travel outside the Philippines: "Embarrassment arises from their inability to keep social lines from blurring (thereby rendering problematic their position as privileged representatives of the nation) and maintaining a distinction between ‘Filipino’ as the name of a sovereign people and ‘Filipino’ as the generic term for designating a subservient class dependent on foreign economies".

Thus, the views held by the Western world regarding Filipinos has been adopted by Filipinos themselves, and do not challenge the undeserving negative perceptions regarding Filipina domestic workers.

== Working conditions ==
The working conditions of the Filipina domestic worker do not display proper representation of the Filipina woman. Even from the beginning, conditions start off negatively:

People are welcomed into countries, are border-crosses, only insofar as they meet the need for "cheap labor" and at the same time produce no strain on the resources of the "host" country. As a result, not only are such migrant workers overlooked by policy makers (governmental and nonprofits), but also by the wider public, leaving their lives and especially the benefits of their work invisible.

The Filipina woman falls under these conditions by immigrating as a domestic worker and thus suffers from its implications.

The Live-in Caregiver Program states that "registrants must live in their employers’ homes". This brings about many implications on its own. First, living in the employer's home gives the feeling of being at work 24 hours a day, 7 days a week. This means that their employer may ask them to do tasks very early or late in the day, even after working a full day. Other issues are vulnerability to sexual abuse and difficulties in challenging their employer due to the fact that their employer is not only providing them a job, but also their shelter.

Most pressing may be the issue of salary and how Filipina domestic workers are unfairly paid. The Filipina woman immigrates as a domestic worker to attain a better life and to provide for her family. However, this becomes difficult to achieve when these women are paid below the minimum wage for their work. Furthermore, it has been reported that while Filipina domestic workers make minimum wage, "those from Europe and Australia make $100 more a month".

Virginia Guiang is a social activist based in Manitoba, best known as the founder and adviser of the Filipino Domestic Workers Association of Manitoba, a volunteer group advocating for the rights of caregivers in the province.

== Bibliography ==
- Lan, Pei-Chia. "Maid of Madam? Filipina Migrant Workers and the Continuity of Domestic Labor." Gender and Society 17, 2 (April 2003): 187–208.
- Parrenas, Rhacel Salazar. "Migrant Filipina Domestic Workers and the International Division of Reproductive Labor." Gender and Society 14, 4 (August 2000): 560–580
- Pratt, Geraldine. "From Registered Nurse to Registered Nanny: Discursive Geographies of Filipina Domestic Workers in Vancouver, B.C." Economic Geography 75, 3 (July 1999): 215–236.
- Tung, Charlene. "The Cost of Caring: The Social Reproductive Labor of Filipina Live-in Home Health Caregivers." Frontiers: A Journal of Women Studies 21, 1/2 (2000): 61–82.
- Zosa, Victorina, and Orbeta Jr., Aniceto. "The Social and Economic Impact of Philippine International Labor Migration and Remittances." Philippine Institute for Development Studies 32 (November 2009): 1–36.
