= BBCM =

BBCM may refer to:

- Bad Boy Club Montréal
- BBC Monitoring
