= Fely Villasin =

Philippine-born activist

- Born: December 24, 1941; Philippines
- Died: December 27, 2006 (aged 65); Toronto, Canada
- Occupation: Activist
- Spouse: Ruben Cusipag
- Children: Nadine Villasin Feldman

Felicita "Fely" Villasin (December 24, 1941 - December 27, 2006) was a Philippine-born activist most notable in her part in the anti-Marcos movement and domestic workers' rights advocacy.

== Biography ==
Felicita Ortuoste Villasin graduated from the University of the Philippines when she was 15, with a Bachelor of Science in Foreign Service. She earned a French government scholarship for the Sorbonne and studied in Paris for four years, where she became increasingly engaged in far-left politics.

She arrived in Toronto in 1974. Her then-husband, Ruben Cusipag, a journalist was among the first people arrested by the Philippine military when President Ferdinand Marcos declared martial law in September 1972. The couple tried to leave the country two years after her husband's release from prison; they were able to immigrate to Canada with the help of a friend.

She became involved in numerous causes, including the International Association of Filipino Patriots, which did educational work about the abuse of human rights in the Philippines. She helped found the Kababayan Multicultural Centre and Kapisanan Philippine Centre in Toronto.

In 1982, Villasin co-founded the Carlos Bulosan Cultural Workshop (now Carlos Bulosan Theatre) as a cultural wing of CAMD, the North America-wide Coalition Against the Marcos Dictatorship. She functioned as de facto artistic director while co-founder Martha Ocampo as the producer.

In 1981, she moved to San Francisco, California, where she worked within the leadership of the national CAMD organization. She came back to Toronto in 1987 and had served as the coordinator for Intercede for the Right of Domestic Workers, Caregivers, Nannies and Newcomers or INTERCEDE, which conducted research and advocacy for Filipina and Caribbean migrant care workers.

She also served as an executive board member of the National Action Committee on the Status of Women (NAC) in Canada.

She died in Toronto on December 27, 2006, at 65 years old.

== Selected publications ==
=== Books authored ===
- Caregivers Break the Silence: a Participatory Action Research on the Abuse and Violence, Including the Impact of Family Separation, Experienced by Women in the Live-in Caregiver Program. Toronto: INTERCEDE, 2001.

=== Chapters ===
- "One February night in San Francisco", in A time to rise : collective memoirs of the Union of Democratic Filipinos (KDP) Ed. Rene Ciria Cruz, Cindy Domingo, Bruce Occena. pp 261–264. Seattle : University of Washington Press, 2017.
- "Taking leadership of the mainstream women's movement", in Migrant women's human rights in G-7 countries: organizing strategies Ed. Mallika Dutt, Leni Marin, Helen Zia. pp 5–9. San Francisco, Calif.: Family Violence Prevention Fund; New Brunswick, N.J.: Center for Women's Global Leadership, 1997.
- "Falling Through the Cracks: Domestic Workers and Progressive Movements", in Canadian Woman Studies Vol 14, No 2, 1994.

== See also ==
- Coalition Against the Marcos Dictatorship
- Protest art against the Marcos dictatorship
- Filipino community in Toronto
