= Asingan =

Municipality in Pangasinan, Philippines

- Municipality
- Municipality of Asingan
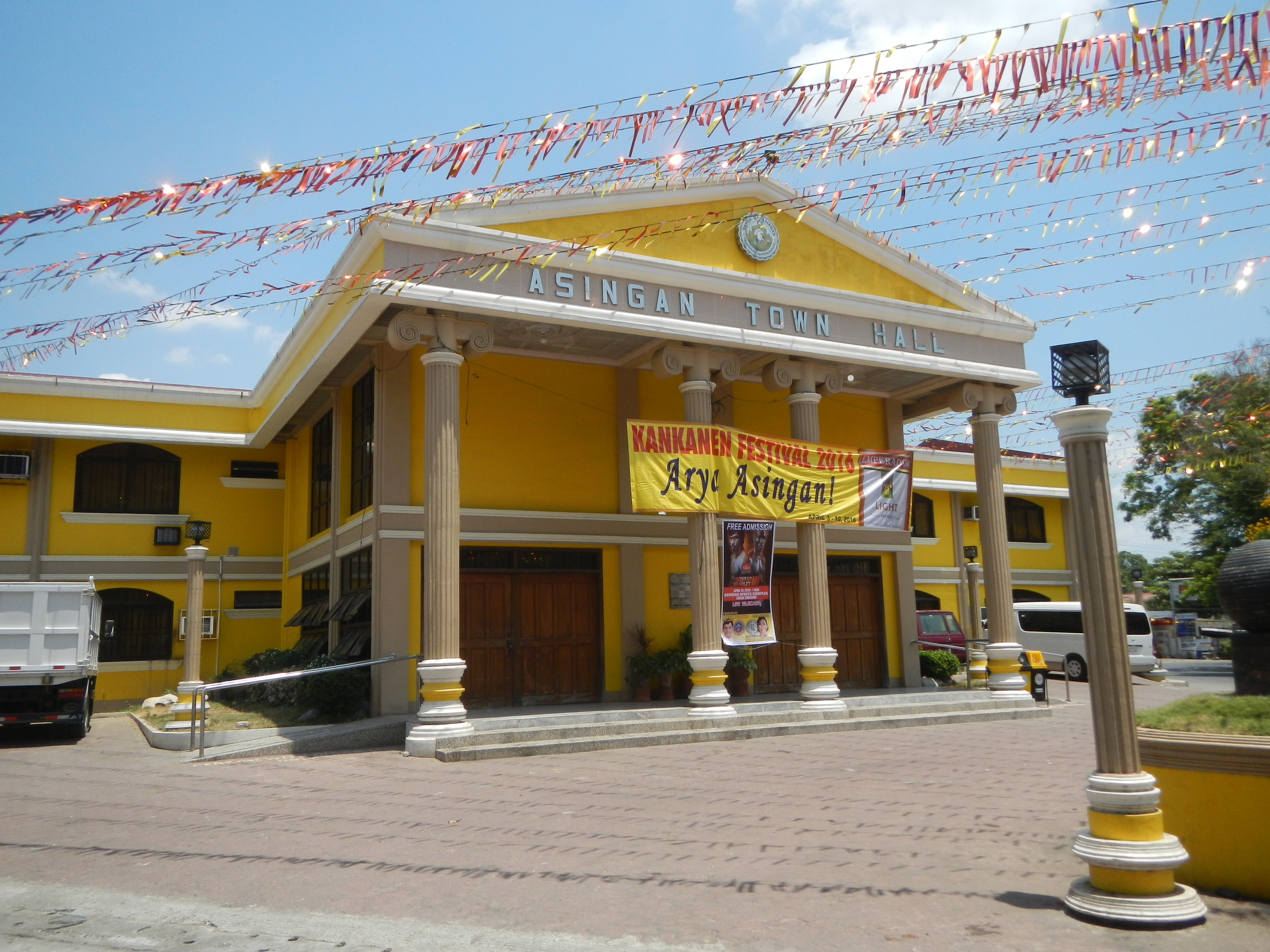
- Asingan Municipal Hall

- Seal
- Etymology: Saltbeds
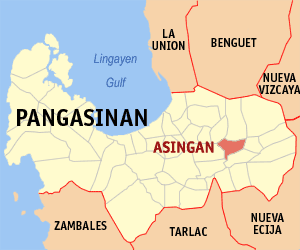
- Map of Pangasinan with Asingan highlighted
- Interactive map of Asingan
- Location within the Philippines
- Coordinates: 16°00′08″N 120°40′10″E
- Country: Philippines
- Region: Ilocos Region
- Province: Pangasinan
- District: 6th district
- Founded: 1782
- Barangays: 18 (see Barangays)

Government
  - Type: Sangguniang Bayan
  - Mayor: Carlos F. Lopez Jr.
  - Vice Mayor: Heidee G. Chua
  - Representative: Marlyn L. Primicias-Agabas
  - Municipal Council: Members: Athena Ira G. Chua; Joselito V. Viray; Johnny Mar A. Carig; Christian Benedict D.C. Robeniol; Melchor O. Cardinez, Jr.; Virgilio I. Amistad; Mark E. Abella; Gilbert S. Piso
  - Electorate: 40,713 voters (2025)

Area
  - Total: 66.64 km^{2} (25.73 sq mi)
- Elevation: 45 m (148 ft)
- Highest elevation: 66 m (217 ft)
- Lowest elevation: 32 m (105 ft)

Population (2024 census)
  - Total: 58,349
  - Density: 875.6/km^{2} (2,268/sq mi)
  - Households: 15,331

Economy
  - Income class: 1st municipal income class
  - Revenue: ₱ 239.8 million (2024)
  - Assets: ₱ 781.5 million (2024)
  - Expenditure: ₱ 220.1 million (2024)
  - Liabilities: ₱ 227.5 million (2024)

Service provider
  - Electricity: Pangasinan 3 Electric Cooperative (PANELCO 3)
- Time zone: UTC+8 (PST)
- ZIP code: 2439
- PSGC: 0105506000
- IDD : area code: +63 (0)75
- Native languages: Pangasinan; Ilocano; Tagalog
- Feast date: October 10
- Catholic diocese: Roman Catholic Diocese of Urdaneta
- Patron saint: St. Louis Bertrand
- Website: www.asingan.gov.ph

Asingan, officially the Municipality of Asingan (Pangasinan: Baley na Asingan; Ilocano: Ili ti Asingan; Tagalog: Bayan ng Asingan), is a municipality in the province of Pangasinan, Philippines. According to the 2024 census, it has a population of 58,349 people.

It was the hometown of President Fidel V. Ramos, the 12th President of the Philippines from 1992–1998.

== Etymology ==
According to historian Francisco Malala, the name of Asingan originated from an early encounter where visitors exclaimed "Naasing kayo," an Ilocano phrase meaning "you are hostile," referring yo locals who resisted outsiders in the area.

== History ==
Asingan traces its origins to the Spanish colonial period through early Dominican missionary efforts in the Caboloan (present-day Pangasinan). Around 1600, missionaries founded the San Bartolome de Agno mission in 1687 near present-day San Manuel, followed by the San Luis Beltran de Sinapog mission in 1698 in the area that is now Asingan along the Sinapog River. Following a 1719 attack on the San Bartolome mission by mountain residents, survivors and friars sought refuge at San Luis Beltran. The establishment of a town was granted by the Governor-General in 1733, and the settlement eventually became Asingan in 1802. During the 1762 revolts against Spain, Asingan and Binmaley remained loyal, serving as a sanctuary for endangered Dominican friars and earning the town the title of "Most Noble and Most Loyal Asingan."

Central to the town's history is the Asingan Catholic Church, which has withstood numerous calamities, insurrections, and earthquakes over the centuries. On March 16, 1892, an earthquake left the structure with horizontal cracks, though it remained functional for worship. During the Philippine Revolution in 1898, revolutionary forces under General Francisco Makabulos captured the area, during which the local convent, then considered as the largest in eastern Pangasinan, was burned down by a Katipunero named Agustin Alejo.

On October 8, 1903, during the subsequent American colonial period, the town of San Manuel and barrio San Andres in Tayug were annexed to Asingan, by virtue of Act No. 931. San Manuel was later separated as a re-established municipality on October 31, 1906.

A powerful earthquake on July 16, 1990 struck the municipality, causing damage especially to the church.

== Geography ==
Asingan is situated 52.78 kilometres (32.80 mi) from the provincial capital Lingayen, and 191.19 kilometres (118.80 mi) from the country's capital city of Manila.

=== Barangays ===
Asingan is politically subdivided into 21 barangays. Each barangay consists of puroks and some have sitios.

- Ariston East
- Ariston West
- Bantog
- Baro
- Bobonan
- Cabalitian
- Calepaan
- Carosucan Norte
- Carosucan Sur
- Coldit
- Domanpot
- Dupac
- Macalong
- Palaris
- Poblacion East
- Poblacion West
- San Vicente Este
- San Vicente Weste
- Sanchez
- Sobol
- Toboy

=== Climate ===
Climate data for Asingan, Pangasinan
Month	Jan	Feb	Mar	Apr	May	Jun	Jul	Aug	Sep	Oct	Nov	Dec	Year
Mean daily maximum °C (°F)	31 (88)	31 (88)	32 (90)	34 (93)	35 (95)	34 (93)	32 (90)	32 (90)	32 (90)	32 (90)	32 (90)	31 (88)	32 (90)
Mean daily minimum °C (°F)	22 (72)	22 (72)	22 (72)	24 (75)	24 (75)	24 (75)	24 (75)	24 (75)	24 (75)	23 (73)	23 (73)	22 (72)	23 (74)
Average precipitation mm (inches)	13.6 (0.54)	10.4 (0.41)	18.2 (0.72)	15.7 (0.62)	178.4 (7.02)	227.9 (8.97)	368 (14.5)	306.6 (12.07)	310.6 (12.23)	215.7 (8.49)	70.3 (2.77)	31.1 (1.22)	1,766.5 (69.56)
Average rainy days	3	2	2	4	14	16	23	21	24	15	10	6	140
Source: World Weather Online

== Demographics ==
Population Census of Asingan
Year	Pop.	±% p.a.
1903	12,911	—
1918	16,920	+1.82%
1939	19,571	+0.70%
1948	24,701	+2.62%
1960	26,453	+0.57%
1970	34,148	+2.58%
1975	36,267	+1.21%
1980	37,301	+0.56%
1990	43,704	+1.60%
1995	46,647	+1.23%
2000	51,225	+2.03%
2007	54,092	+0.75%
2010	56,353	+1.50%
2015	57,355	+0.34%
2020	57,811	+0.17%
2024	58,349	+0.22%
Source: Philippine Statistics Authority

== Economy ==
Poverty incidence of Asingan

Source: Philippine Statistics Authority

== Government ==
=== Local government ===
Asingan is part of the sixth congressional district of the province of Pangasinan. It is governed by a mayor, designated as its local chief executive, and by a municipal council as its legislative body in accordance with the Local Government Code. The mayor, vice mayor, and the councilors are elected directly by the people through an election which is being held every three years.

=== Elected officials ===
The composition of the Municipal Government of Asingan as of June 30, 2025

Municipal Government of Asingan
Position	Name	Year Elected	Term No.
Representative (6th District)	Marlyn L. Primicias Agabas	2022	5
Mayor	Engr. Carlos F. Lopez Jr.	2019	3
Vice Mayor	Heidee L. Ganigan-Chua	2019	3
Councilor	Athena Ira G. Chua	2019	3
Councilor	Joselito V. Viray	2019	3
Councilor	Johnny Mar A. Carig	2019	3
Councilor	Christian Benedict D.C. Robeniol	2025	1
Councilor	Melchor O. Cardinez, Jr.	2025	1
Councilor	Virgilio I. Amistad	2022	5
Councilor	Mark E. Abella	2025	4
Councilor	Gilbert S. Piso	2025	1
Councilor (ex-officio member); ABC President	Herminio C. Alcantara, Jr.	2023	1
Councilor (ex-officio member); SK President	Napthali Magiting P. Bernabe	2023	1

== Culture ==
=== Kankanen Festival ===
On April 13, 2024, Mayor Carlos Lopez Jr. led the town's annual "Kankanen Festival" with the 21 barangays serving 464 bilaos of rice cakes made from glutinous rice.

== Education ==
There are two schools district offices which govern all educational institutions within the municipality. They oversee the management and operations of all private and public elementary and high schools. These are Asingan I Schools District Office, and Asingan II Schools District Office.

=== Primary and elementary schools ===
- Ariston Este Elementary School
- Ariston-Bantog Elementary School
- Bobonan Elementary School
- Carosucan Adventist Multigrade School
- Carosucan East Elementary School
- Carosucan Norte Elementary School
- Carosucan Sur Elementary School
- Domanpot Elementary School
- Don H. Velasco Community School
- Don Teodorico Bauzon Elementary School
- Lightbearers Learning Center
- Narciso R. Ramos Elementary School SPED Center
- North Central School
- Palaris Elementary School
- San Vicente Este Elementary School
- Sanchez-Cabalitian Elementary School
- Sir Mosesnar School
- Sobol Elementary School
- Teofilo Gante Elementary School
- Toboy Elementary School

=== Secondary schools ===
- Angela Valdez Ramos National High School
- Ariston-Bantog National High School
- Calepaan Integrated School
- Carosucan Norte National High School
- Carosucan Sur National High School
- Luciano Millan National High School
- San Vicente West Integrated School
- Toboy National High School

== Notable personalities ==
- Fidel V. Ramos – 12th President of the Philippines (1992–1998)
- Leticia Ramos Shahani – Senator of the Philippines (1987–1998)
- Narciso Ramos – diplomat and father of President Fidel V. Ramos and Senator Leticia Ramos-Shahani. Former Secretary of Foreign Affairs during Marcos presidency, Filipino Founding Father of ASEAN
- Retired General Hermogenes Esperon, Jr. – retired general of the Armed Forces of the Philippines under President Corazon C. Aquino and President Fidel V. Ramos. AFP Chief of Staff (2004–2009) under President Gloria Macapagal Arroyo. Present Secretary of National Security Council under President Rodrigo Duterte.
- Colonel Vicente S. Santos Jr – founding president of Kapatiran ng mga Kawal na Makawikang Pilipino (KAKAMPI) and author of numerous military books and publications.
- Jhong Hilario- well-known sample king TV personality of ABS-CBN and dancer. Current Councilor of the First District of Makati (1st District)
- Columbia 'Coco' Diaz- community organizer for domestic workers and caregivers in Canada
