= Mark Anthony (DJ) =

French Canadian DJ and music producer

Mark Levitt
- Origin: Montreal, Quebec, Canada
- Genres: House
- Occupations: Disc jockey, record producer
- Years active: 1998–present
- Labels: Dark Panties Recordings
- Website: www.markanthonymusic.com

DJ Mark Anthony is a Canadian DJ and music producer from Montréal who co-launched the web-based music label Dark Panties Recordings. He is married to Sandra Jean-Bart, who is his business partner. He has two children.

He has had a presence in Montreal's Black and Blue Festival main events produced by Bad Boy Club Montréal from its inception in 1991, returning 15 more times to headline the main event in 1995-2000, 2002–2004, 2006–2011, making him the most featured DJ in the festival. The first issue of Montreal's Nightlife Magazine in March 1999 carried Mark Anthony on its cover. On its 10th anniversary, the same magazine picked Mark Anthony as one of the Top 100 that have changed Montreal nightlife. He regularly DJ'd at Playground, Unity (Montreal) and has a regular show in Red Lite (Laval).

== Discography ==
=== Albums ===
- 2002: Ritual: The Album (Nerds Records / Dark Panties Recordings)

=== Compilations ===
- 1998: Mark Anthony Presents the Circuit Party (SPG Music)
- 1999, 2000, 2002, 2003: Black & Blue Festival (Nu Muzik / Masterbeat)
- 2000: Global Grooves (Edge / Centaur)
- 2001: Circuit Sessions 5 (4Play)
- 2001: Sona Massive (Yul Records)
- 2004-2006: Lectro Dub Parts 1 & 2 (Dark Panties Recordings)
- 2006: Red Lite Series (CD) (Red Lite Records)
