= Vicente S. Santos Jr. =

Filipino army colonel

Col. Vicente "Vic" S. Santos Jr.
- Born: May 17, 1944; Asingan, Pangasinan
- Died: February 17, 2012 (aged 68); Muntinlupa, Philippines
- Burial place: Libingan Ng Mga Bayani
- Spouse: Erlinda Tolete Santos
- Military career
- Allegiance: Republic of the Philippines
- Branch: Philippine Army
- Service years: 1966–91
- Rank: Colonel
- Nicknames: Vic, KAKAMPI, Brod Vic, Papang Vic
- Commands: Armed Forces of the Philippines
- Conflicts: Communist insurgency in the Philippines; Moro insurgency in the Philippines

Vicente "Vic" Sumajit Santos Jr. (May 17, 1944 – February 17, 2012) was a colonel of the Philippine Army – Armed Forces of the Philippines (AFP). He is the author of several military books and other publications, as well as the founding president of Kapatiran ng mga Kawal na Makawikang Pilipino (KAKAMPI).

== Early life ==
Santos was born in Asingan in the province of Pangasinan, Philippines on May 17, 1944, to 3rd Lt. Vicente De Leon Santos and Catalina Dela Cruz Sumajit, he was the eldest among three children. His father was then a military officer who served under the USAFFE during World War II, and was later absorbed in the Armed Forces of the Philippines after the war, and is also a recipient of the United States Congressional Gold Medal, whereas his mother worked as a government school teacher.

He took his secondary education in Southern Christian College and graduated valedictorian in 1961.

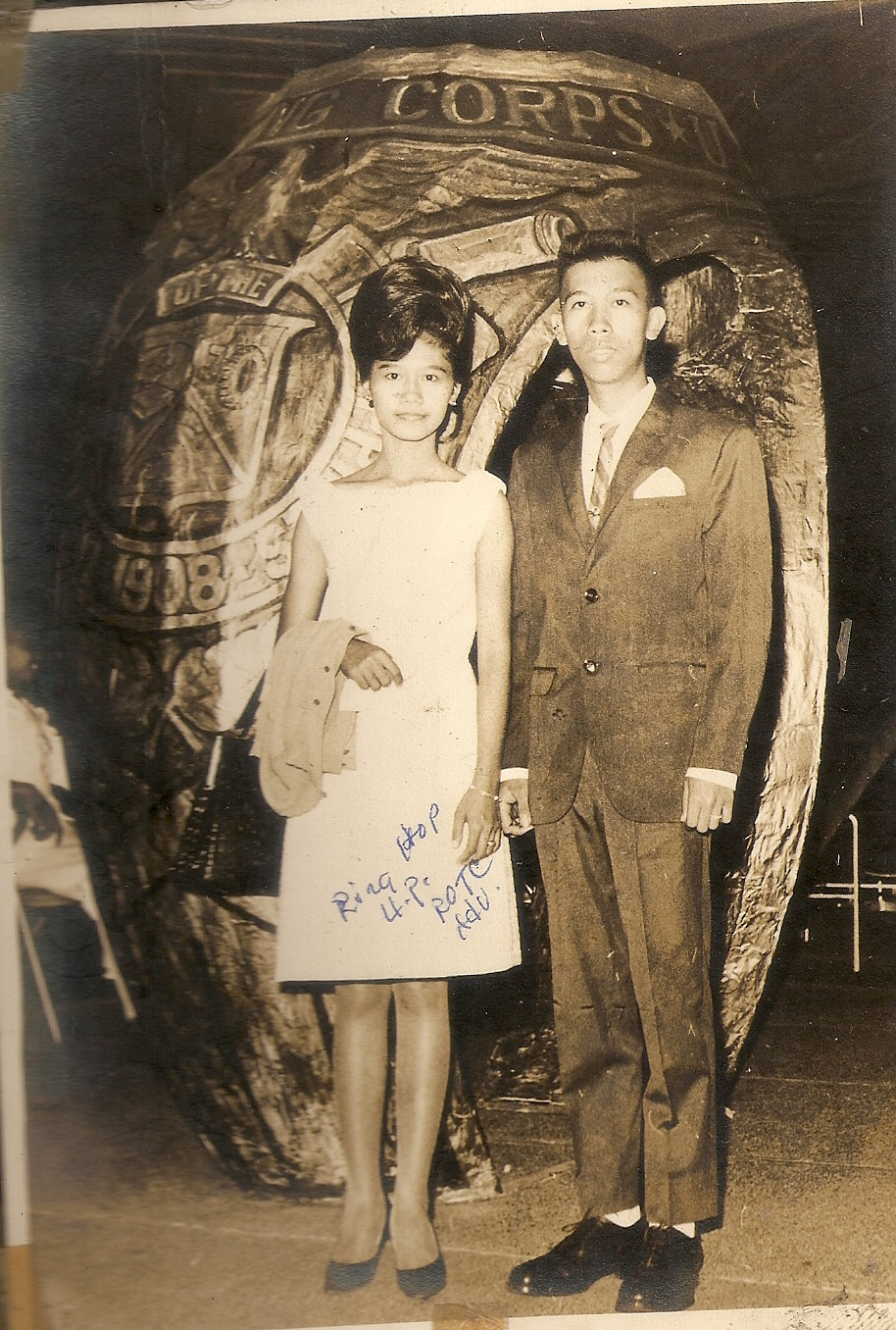
Photo of Col. Vicente Santos Jr, with his then-future-wife, Erlinda during a Ring Hop Ball in the University of the Philippines ROTC, 1966

He graduated at the University of the Philippines with a degree in AB Social Science in 1966. He also showed interest in the military when he graduated on the top of his Advance University of the Philippines ROTC Class of 1966 at the University of the Philippines Diliman Campus as a cadet colonel and class valedictorian.

== Military career ==
He held several positions in the Armed Forces of the Philippines during his military career, one of them is the position of the Assistant Chief of Staff for Civil Military Operations, G-7 and Historical Officer of the HSC, General Headquarters, AFP.

The last position he occupied in the Armed Forces of the Philippines before his retirement was Chief of Value Information Division, Office of the Deputy Chief of Staff for Civil-Military Operations, J-7, AFP.

=== Defense of Camp Emilio Aguinaldo – August 1987 ===
During the attempt to overthrow the Corazon Aquino government in 1987, Santos was one of the defenders of the General Headquarters Building located at the center of Camp Aguinaldo, the headquarters of the Armed Forces of the Philippines. The GHQ building was burned to the ground during an attack by rebel forces of the Reform the Armed Forces Movement, and Santos sustained serious injuries to his lungs; injuries which eventually caused him to take a Complete Disability Discharge (CDD) and retire from military service in 1991.

In the book entitled Demokrasya at Kudeta, by Col. Gaudencio "Ding" L. San Juan, the defense of the GHQ Building was cited and particularly, Santos' account was mentioned.

== Private life ==
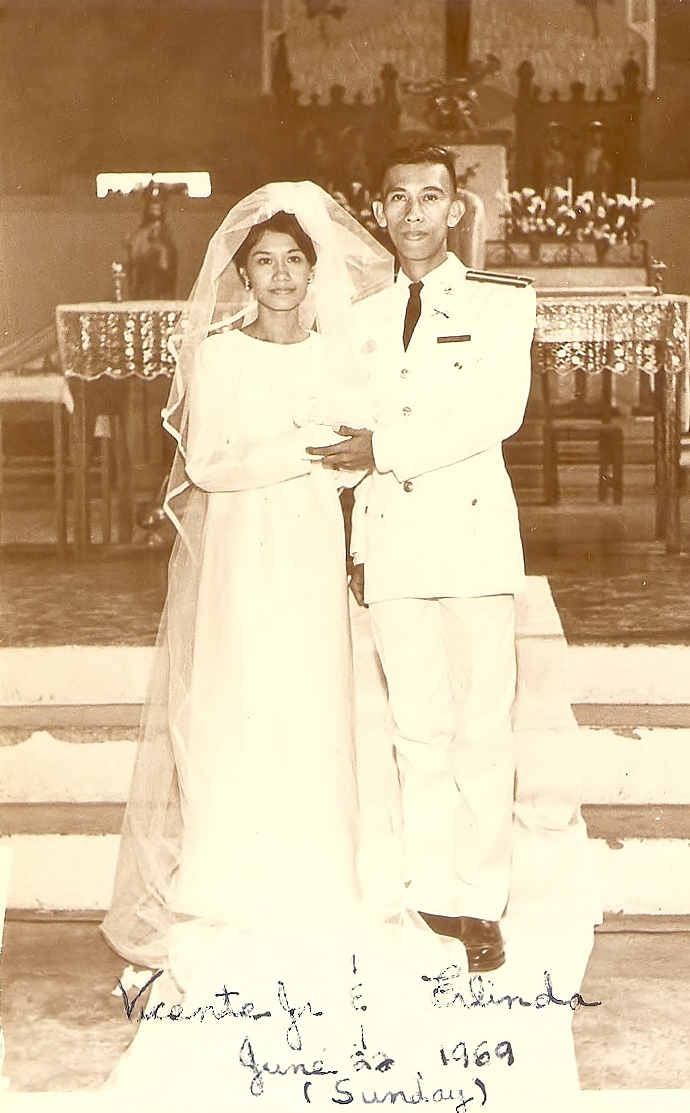
Col. Vicente S. Santos Jr and his wife, Erlinda Tolete Santos on their "Military Wedding" day

Santos married the former Erlinda Solis Tolete on June 22, 1969. Erlinda Santos was a public school teacher, and also a civil servant. They have six children, Vicente III, Benhur, Singapor, Vicerly, Pilipino and Fabian.

Santos was a Born-again Apostolic Christian, he believed in the apostolic doctrine in the Bible at the Book of Acts, Chapter Two (New Testament Plan of Salvation: Acts 2:38) that states:

And Peter said to them, "Repent and be baptized every one of you in the name of Jesus Christ for the forgiveness of your sins, and you will receive the gift of the Holy Spirit."

and attended church at the Lighthouse Apostolic Ministry of Pentecost (LAMP). Before his conversion to born-again Christianity, Santos had been a Bible reader since his childhood. His mother taught him biblical principles which he eventually carried on throughout his life.

At one instance, a few hours before the bloodiest coup attack in Camp Aguinaldo, he was approached by Col. Gregorio Honasan to convince him to join the coup attempts and support the rebel forces against the Corazon Aquino administration. Santos took hold of his pocket Bible and declined the invitation to join the coup. '"I am neutral, my loyalty belongs to God and to my country..."'. A few hours later, the siege of Camp Aguinaldo began.

== Retirement years ==
After the bloodiest coup attempt of 1987, Santos' health slowly deteriorated as a result of his taking part in the defense of the AFP GHQ building, which the rebel soldiers razed to the ground.

Although, he was insistent to continue serving his nation in the Armed Forces of the Philippines; his body could no longer fully perform the physical rigors of a soldier. Upon the advice of his military doctors, Santos inevitably opted to file for a Complete Disability Discharge (CDD) paving way for his early retirement on September 30, 1991.

Having completed 25 years of service, starting from January 17, 1966, to September 29, 1991; Santos retired from the military service of the Armed Forces of the Philippines in the grade of colonel pursuant to Sections 7, 9 and 17 of Presidential Decree 1638, and AFP General Orders 932 dated December 7, 1992.

Santos went on to serve his nation through writing of several military books and publications. He also participated in the development of his community. In 1997, he was appointed as a Public Information Officer of Brgy. Putatan, Muntinlupa by Col. Pablo E. Salamat, who was then the Barangay Chairman of Putatan, Muntinlupa. He also became a columnist and Editor-in-chief of "Ang Bagong Kalayaan" newspaper (1996); and "Balita sa Barangay" (The first Barangay Newsletter in the Philippines, and the official newsletter of Barangay Putatan, Muntinlupa – 1997).

His dedication for the military and concern for the welfare of the veterans and retired soldiers inspired him to write his last book entitled, "The Veteran is Worth Caring For". Together with his youngest son, Prof. Fabian T. Santos, and several military friends like Col. Robinson Lumontod and Col. Gaudencio San Juan, they extensively researched and compiled veteran issues and records which comprised the book.

After several months of praying and coordinating with government agencies, the book was finally launched on May 17, 2011, at the AFP Theatre, Camp Aguinaldo; coincidentally it was also his birthday. The latest volume of this book was co-published by the Philippine Veterans Affairs Office (PVAO) through the support of Undersecretary of National Defense Ernesto G. Carolina.

== Death ==
He died peacefully at his residence in February 17, 2012, due to lung complications caused by the disability he incurred while defending the General Headquarters of the Armed Forces of the Philippines in one of the bloodiest coup d'état of the 1986–90 Philippine coup attempts. The August 1987 Philippine coup attempt was led by then Col. Gregorio Honasan, a friend and colleague of his.

=== Santos Hall ===
During the incumbency of then Gen. Hermogenes Esperon as the Chief of Staff of the Armed Forces of the Philippines, a hall inside the AFP General Headquarters was named in honor of Santos. Santos Hall was a recognition of his plight in the burning GHQ building during the defense of the Camp Aguinaldo against the bloodiest coup attempt of August 28, 1987.

=== Place of interment ===
Several government officials and officers of the military attended his wake, including former Philippine president Fidel V. Ramos.

He was interred with full military honors at the COL. VICENTE S. SANTOS, JR - TOMB at the Libingan ng mga Bayani, Fort Andres Bonifacio, Metro Manila.

== Publications ==
Santos was a prolific writer, an advocate of the Filipino language and was influential in the use of Filipino (Tagalog) military commands and terminology in the Armed Forces of the Philippines. Together with Col. Gaudencio "Ding" San Juan, he co-founded the Kapatiran ng mga Kawal na Makawikang Pilipino (KAKAMPI), a military organization to promote the use of Filipino for the development of the Armed Forces of the Philippines, and served as its founding President.

Santos wrote several military books and other publications which can also be found in the US Library of Congress, among which were:

- The Veteran is Worth Caring For (2010) (Revised 2011)
- Almanac ng ROTC-NSTP Vol.2(2008)
- Almanac ng ROTC-NSTP Vol.1 (2007)
- Filipino para sa Sundalo(2005)
- History of GHQ & HSC, AFP and Camp Gen. Emilio Aguinaldo (Kasaysayan ng Kampo Aguinaldo) (1989)
- Diksyunaryo ng Kawal at Pulis (1985)
- Filipino para sa Kawal, Pulis at Kadete (1984)
- Diksyunaryo ng Kadete (1981)
- Soldier's Dictionary (1978)

Santos also edited Balita sa Kampo (the official newsletter of AFP in 1990) and was a member of the Philippine Army Ad Hoc Committee on the National Language Propagation (1974). He also became a columnist and Editor-in-chief of Ang Bagong Kalayaan newspaper (1996), the Balita sa Barangay (the first Barangay newsletter in the Philippines and the official newsletter of Barangay Putatan, Muntinlupa – 1997).

== Military awards, decorations and commendations ==
Santos received numerous military decorations and awards, among them are:

- Outstanding Achievement Medal
- Military Merit Medal with 3rd Bronze Anahaw Leaf
- Military Merit Medal with 2nd Bronze Anahaw Leaf
- Military Merit Medal with 1st Bronze Anahaw Leaf
- Military Commendation Medals
- Presidential Unit Citation Badge
- Luzon Campaign Medal
- Martial Law Citation Badge
- Visayan Campaign Medal
- Anti-Dissidence Campaign Medal
- Disaster Relief and Rehabilitation Operation Ribbon
- AFP TANGLAW Badge
- Instructor's Badge – HPASC (now TRADOC)
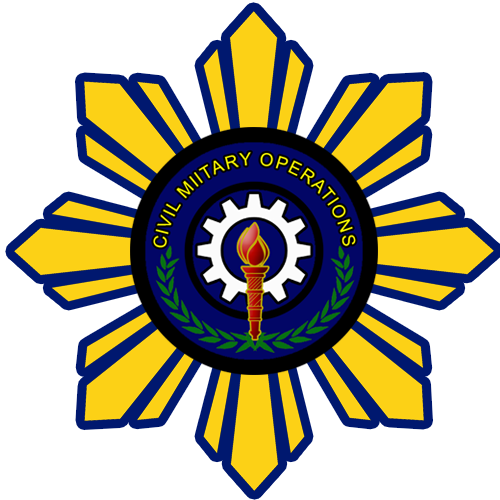
- AFP Home Defense Badge
- AFP Civil-Military Operations Badge
- Sharpshooter Badge
- Long Service Medal 25 Years of Military Service
- Letters of Commendation from the Chief of Staff and Former President Fidel V. Ramos
- Letters of Commendations from CSAFP Gen. Fabian Ver
- Letters of Commendations from CGPA Gen. Rafael Zagala
- Plaque of Appreciation from then Gen. Fidel V. Ramos
- Various Military Commendations and Plaques

Santos was also a recipient of the "Gawad ng Pagkilala" from the Surian ng Wikang Pambansa (now Komisyon sa Wikang Filipino) for his exemplary efforts in the promotion and propagation of the Filipino language in the military, particularly in the Armed Forces of the Philippines.
