= Ging Hernandez =

Philippine-born activist

- Born: December 27, 1943
- Died: December 6, 2011 (aged 67); Toronto, Canada
- Occupation: activist

Carmencita "Ging" Hernandez (December 27, 1943 - December 6, 2011) was an activist most notable in her part in the anti-Marcos movement and women's rights movement in Canada.

== Biography ==
Carmencita Rocha Hernandez came to Canada in 1975, with a Masters of Science degree in finance from University of Minnesota.

In the 1970s, as the Philippines struggled under the Marcos dictatorship, Hernandez was one of the few activist leaders who led the Second Propaganda Movement against the Marcos dictatorship and formed the Toronto chapter of the Coalition Against the Marcos Dictatorship/Philippine Solidarity Network. She became the spokesperson of the Canadian Campaign for the United Opposition in the Philippines.

She co-founded the Kababayan Multicultural Centre, a settlement agency advocating for the rights of Filipino people in Toronto, where she served as a board member together with fellow anti-Marcos activists Ruben Cusipag, Tessie Jew, Voltaire de Leon, and Helen Mascardo in 1977. She was instrumental in setting up Kababayan's programs for the youth and women which took flight during her incumbency as president of Kababayan.

In 1978, she co-founded Balita, one of the first Filipino newspapers in Canada, and became its contributing editor.

She helped establish the Carlos Bulosan Cultural Workshop (now Carlos Bulosan Theatre), a Toronto theatre group which debuted in 1982 with Carding, a play about Filipino immigrants in Canada.

As a women's rights advocate, served various functions in women's committees and coalitions. She served on the board of INTERCEDE, an organization that worked for the welfare of foreign domestic workers, advocating for their right to remain in Canada at the end of their contracts. She was one of the founders of the Coalition of Visible Minority Women (Ontario), which advocated for the rights of immigrant women in Canada.

In 1986, Hernandez was among the attendees of the inaugural meeting of the National Organization of Immigrant and Visible Minority Women of Canada, an umbrella national organization with a vision of creating equality for all women. She was elected the NOIVMWC Regional Vice President representing Ontario through which she organized with the Canadian Ethnocultural Council Women's Issues Committee. She spoke at events as a representative of a member organization of the national Coalition for a Just Refugee and Immigration Policy and as a panelist at various community, labour and feminist events.

Among Filipino organizations, she served as the chair of the Women's Committee of the National Council of Canadian-Filipino Associations (formerly United Council of Filipino Associations in Canada or UCFAC), a non-profit federal organization representing member associates across Canada formed in 1963 and incorporated in 1990. Being the regional representative of Greater Toronto Area. In 1992, Hernandez helped organize the first Filipino Canadian National Conference on Wife Abuse and Violence Against Women held in Montreal.

She was also a member of the Philippines-Canada Development Forum and Philippine Historical Society.

She died on December 6, 2011, at Toronto Western Hospital, three days after she suffered a massive stroke.

== Selected publications ==
- "The Coalition of Visible Minority Women," in Social Movements / Social Change Ed. Frank Cunningham, Sue Findlay, Marlene Kadar, Alan Lennon and Ed Silva. pp 157–168. Toronto: Between the Lines, 1989.
- "The Foundation of NOIVMWC (The National Organization of Immigrant And Visible Minority Women of Canada)," in Canadian Woman Studies Volume 8, No. 2. 1987.

== Legacy ==
In 1987, the City of Toronto gave her its Constance E. Hamilton award, which recognizes efforts to secure fair treatment for women. Two years later, the Toronto Star named her Woman of the Year.

In 1990 she received a YWCA Women of Distinction Award in community service.

in 1993 she was honoured with the prestigious BANAAG Award, given by the Philippine government to overseas Filipinos with extraordinary achievements or humanitarian work.

== See also ==
- Coalition Against the Marcos Dictatorship
- Carlos Bulosan Theatre
- Protest art against the Marcos dictatorship
- Filipino community in Toronto
