= Islands (2021 film) =

- Directed by: Martin Edralin
- Written by: Martin Edralin
- Produced by: Martin Edralin; Priscilla Galvez
- Starring: Rogelio Balagtas; Vangie Alcasid; Esteban Comilang; Sheila Lotuaco
- Cinematography: Diego Guijarro
- Edited by: Bryan Atkinson
- Production companies: Circus Zero; Silent Tower
- Release date: March 16, 2021 (SXSW)
- Running time: 94 minutes
- Country: Canada
- Languages: English; Tagalog

Islands is a 2021 Canadian drama film, written, produced, and directed by Martin Edralin. The film stars Rogelio Balagtas as Joshua, a Filipino Canadian man in his late 40s who has sacrificed his own happiness to care for his aging parents Alma (Vangie Alcasid) and Reynaldo (Esteban Comilang); following his mother's death, his cousin Marisol (Sheila Lotuaco) comes to visit and offers to help care for Reynaldo, leading Joshua to confront what he really wants in life when he begins to experience misplaced feelings of falling in love with Marisol.

Edralin has described the film as inspired in part by the archetype of the "maiden aunt" who stays with her parents and never marries or builds her own independent life, and by a desire to explore that story from the less familiar perspective of a man in the same situation.

The film received production funding from Telefilm Canada's Talent to Watch funding program in 2018. Edralin had originally planned to set the film in the Philippines, but subsequently decided to tell it as a story about Filipino immigrants in Canada.

The film premiered at the 2021 SXSW Film Festival, where Balagtas won the Special Jury Prize for Breakthrough Performance.

== Critical response ==
Barry Hertz of The Globe and Mail praised the film, writing that "Alternately buoyant and heartbreaking, Edralin’s film moves with the kind of carefully calibrated speed that is deeply impressive for a first-timer. So much happens to Joshua over the course of Islands, yet also not that much. Every moment – a minor embarrassment, a brief sliver of hope – only feels momentous because Edralin has created such a relatable, alive underdog of a character. Joshua is a man who we all think we might know – perhaps someone from the periphery of our own lives – but one whose interior life we never gave much thought. Joshua’s richness as a character, though, may have delivered less of an impact if not for Balagtas. With just a short film to his name prior to joining Islands, the Winnipeg actor delivers an honest, stripped-down performance so real that it seems lifted from a documentary. Of course, the actor’s virtual anonymity helps, but there is a deliberate, professional control to Balagtas’ work here that bears the hallmark of a gifted actor."

== Awards ==
Award	Date of ceremony	Category	Recipient(s)	Result	Ref(s)
Canadian Screen Awards	2022	Best Actor	Rogelio Balagtas	Nominated	
Canadian Screen Awards	2022	Best Supporting Actor	Esteban Comilang	Nominated	
Canadian Screen Awards	2022	John Dunning Best First Feature	Martin Edralin	Nominated	
Kingston Canadian Film Festival	2022	Best Canadian Film	Martin Edralin	Won	
