= Carlos Bulosan Theatre =

Canadian theatre company

- Interactive map of Carlos Bulosan Theatre
- Address: Canada
- Location: 95 Danforth Avenue, Suite 202, Toronto, Ontario; M4K 1N2

Construction
- Opened: 1982

Website
- www.carlosbulosan.com

Carlos Bulosan Theatre (CBT) is the only long-standing professional Filipino-Canadian theatre company in Canada and is based in Toronto, Ontario. It was founded in 1982 by activists Fely Villasin, Martha Ocampo, Voltaire de Leon, Ging Hernandez and Bernie Consul under the name Carlos Bulosan Cultural Workshop (as a cultural wing of the North American-based Coalition Against the Marcos Dictatorship). Now in its 37th year, CBT continues to celebrate its history of artistic activity and service to Filipino-Canadians and their broader community.

Honouring its namesake, Filipino poet Carlos Bulosan, CBT produces theatre that reflects on socio-political issues affecting the Filipino community. CBT aims to focus on the encouragement and development of emerging Filipino-Canadian playwrights/performers/multidisciplinary artists and strives to create innovative work that represents vibrant, artistic voices from both older and newer generations of Filipino-Canadians. CBT also seeks to build a larger audience within the varying diasporas in Canada by using a wide range of story-telling that includes Theatre for Young Audiences, theatre based in realism/naturalism, as well as experimental works and one-act presentations.

CBT is a charitable, not-for-profit organization and a former member of the Canada Council for the Arts' Stand Firm, Toronto Theatre Alliance and an affiliate member of PACT (Professional Association of Canadian Theatres).

== Artistic Producers ==
- Leon Aureus (2012–present)

== Past Theatre Works ==
- Carding (1984, 1986) - a play following the story of a new Filipino immigrant in Canada.
- Inay Kung Alam Mo Lang/If My Mother Could See Me Now (1989, 1990) - a play about domestic workers.
- Sampung Mga Daliri/Ten Fingers (1991) - a historical interplay of characters depicting the Philippines past and present.
- Carlos Bulosan: A Trilogy (1992) - a play about the life and works of Carlos Bulosan, a Filipino immigrant in North America.
- Home Sweet Home (1993-1994) - a play about violence against women in the Filipino-Canadian community.
- Noong Kapanahunan Ko... Not On My Time (1994) - a play following the effects of generational gaps in Filipino culture; what we take and what we leave behind from the past traditions, as well as what we choose from the present to incorporate and adapt into our lives today.
- No Boundaries (1995) - a play about how current economic changes have affected the lives of Filipino-Canadians.
- Walang Sugat (Undefeated) (1996, 1998) - a sarsuela (musical production) set in late 1896 when Filipinos took arms against Spanish rule.
- Images of 1896 (1997) - a sarsuela about the resistance to Spanish colonial rule.
- Tales from the Flipside - New Works Festival (ongoing) - an annual festival showcasing new works in development by emerging Filipino-Canadian playwrights, and featuring both emerging and established artists within the local theatre community. A number of CBT’s plays have been developed as part of this series.
- Miss Orient(ed) (2003) - a play written by CBT artists Nadine Villasin and Nina Lee Aquino examining the politics of cultural identity through the eyes of three young beauty pageant contestants. This play marked CBT’s first professional production, and also Canada’s first professional Filipino-Canadian theatrical production.
- The Romance of Magno Rubio (2005) - a multidisciplinary piece about a young Filipino farm labourer’s experience with racism in Depression-era California.
- People Power (2006, 2008, 2010) - a collective creation piece by CBT artists Leon Aureus, Nadine Villasin, Nicco Lorenzo Garcia, Rose Cortez and Christine Mangosing with poetry by Len Cervantes telling the story of the 1986 Philippine People Power Revolution through the eyes of different Philippines citizens during that time period. In 2010, CBT embarked on its first tour as a professional theatre company by taking this play to Montreal.
- Baggage (2008 Toronto Fringe Festival, Pulan Muleta Collective) - a series of five short plays revolving around the cultural baggage of being Filipino-Canadian.
- Shotgun Wedding (2011 Toronto Fringe Festival) - an independent musical written by Len Cervantes.
- Sister Mary’s a Dyke?! (2012) - a workshop production of a comedic play that explores issues of religion and sexual orientation in an all-girls Catholic private school. Written by Flerida Pena.
- In the Shadow of Elephants (2013) - a collective creation play by CBT artists Leon Aureus, Nadine Villasin, Nicco Lorenzo Garcia, Rose Cortez, Christine Mangosing and Aura Carcueva exploring the history of resistance to colonial powers in the Philippines through the perspectives of different Filipinos from pre-colonial to modern-day Philippines.
- Through the Bamboo (2014) - a new play-in-development workshop and public reading by Andrea Mapili & Byron Abalos.
- Love by Numbers (2014) - a new play-in development by Celeste Palanca. A public reading of the play was presented as part of Tales from the Flipside/Kultura Philippine Arts Festival.
- TAGSIBOL Artist Incubator Workshop Program (2015, 2016) - With the goal to reconnect and build a new generation of young Filipino-Canadian artists, CBT launched the TAGSIBOL (Springtime, Renewal, Rebirth) Artist Workshops Program, offering Improv, Yoga + Movement, Indigenous Studies, Play Readings and Mentorship Talks. Coming out of these sessions, CBT introduced early collective creation activities.
- CBT30: Tayo Na! & Staged Reading of People Power (2016) - a celebration of CBT’s 34 year anniversary.
- Respect, Justice, Dignity (2016) - in an effort to reconnect with CBT’s community activist roots, artists developed and performed a short presentation using excerpts from Carlos Bulosan poems for a labour conference organized by the Filipino Workers Network.
- Kaldero (2016, 2017) - a new Theatre-for-Young-Audiences play written by Leon Aureus. The play draws upon Filipino folklore and mythology and introduces Filipino dance, music and food/culture to children. The play premiered at St. Leo’s in Etobicoke, and had a successful mini-tour in Spring 2017 throughout several TCDSB (Toronto Catholic District School Board) elementary schools.
- ‘FAM JAM’ Comedy Night (2016) - spinning-off from the TAGSIBOL - Artist Incubator Program’s Improv sessions, CBT supported the premiere of sister company, FAM JAM, in August 2016.
- In the Heart (2016) - CBT artists created a short theatrical presentation for the PIDC (Philippine Independence Day Committee) Mabuhay! Philippine Festival in August 2016, celebrating the history of Filipino immigration in Canada alongside poetry and writings of various Filipino heroes and poets included Jose Rizal and Carlos Bulosan.
- Anak (2016 public reading in Tales from the Flipside/Kultura Philippine Arts Festival, 2017 workshop production) - a new play about family — their hopes and dreams, their secrets and lies, and their struggle to stay together in the face of unexpected challenges that uncover deep-seated resentment and tensions. Written by CBT artists Ann Paula Bautista, Belinda Corpuz, Isabel Kanaan, Richard Mojica, Alia Rasul and Anthony Raymond Yu with contributions by Ulysses Valiante and Ray Jacildo.
- Our Time of Night (2017) - new play written by CBT artist Richard Mojica that investigates the extrajudicial killings and war-on-drugs occurring in the Philippines under Duterte’s rule. This multidisciplinary piece includes traditional Philippine Kundiman and Harana music, as well as shadow puppetry. A workshop version of the play was broadcast on Montreal radio show ‘Sigaw Ng Bayan’ (CKUT 90.3FM).
- Carlos Bulosan Theatre Anthology Project Launch (2017) - an evening of featured readings from CBT's past works, led by Leon Aureus &Belinda Corpuz, and were performed by past and present CBT artists to help raise funds for Carlos Bulosan Theatre's Anthology. Held at Tarragon Theatre
- TAGSIBOL Theatre Artist Workshop (2018) - a play-writing workshop series led by dramaturg Ash Knight that helped upcoming Filipino-Canadian artists develop their playwriting skills. Held at Tarragon Theatre through their artist workspace program.
- MapasanTu (2019) - a new play-in-development written by Hollie Reamico & Jamiah Tionko that features a collective collaboration from CBT Artists Ranelle Aquino, Leon Aureus and Joy Castro, with movement by Aura Carcueva. The play's title is two Tagalog words combined: Mapasandal, meaning 'to lean against' and Tulog, meaning 'to sleep' and it revolves around the experiences of two young Filipino newcomers to Canada as they navigate the challenges of life in a new country.

== Upcoming Projects ==
- TAGSIBOL Theatre Artist Workshop - Spring 2019
- CBT Anthology: The Film - Winter 2019
