= Dominic Penaloza =

Chinese-Filipino entrepreneur

Dominic Penaloza is a Chinese-Filipino entrepreneur and investor who was born and raised in Toronto, Canada. He was the CEO & founder of Ushi, a Chinese professional network based in Shanghai. He was the CEO and founder of WorldFriends, a social networking service for internationally minded people, with offices in Shanghai and Tokyo and partnered with Yahoo Japan. He has received several awards including the Ivey Emerging Leaders Award. He was the Chief Innovation & Technology Officer at naked Hub, a company that was acquired by WeWork for US$400 million. At WeWork China he was the Head of Innovation & Technology. After leaving WeWork in early 2020, he started REinvent, Asia's first proptech startup studio as CEO and cofounder. One of REinvent's ventures is Switch, a workspace on-demand platform.
