= Jhet van Ruyven =

Filipino-Canadian author (born 1959)

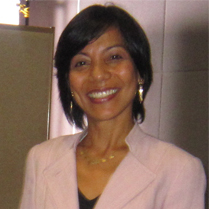
- Jhet van Ruyven at the 2010 Breakthrough to Success Seminar with Jack Canfield in Manila, Philippines
- Born: Juliet Torcelino; January 9, 1959 (age 67); Batangas Philippines
- Occupations: Author and Motivational Speaker
- Website: jhetvanruyven.com

Jhet van Ruyven (born Juliet Torcelino; January 9, 1959) is a Filipino-Canadian author who wrote the auto-biographical book The Tale of Juliet in 2005.

The Tale of Juliet is van Ruyven's self-published book which tells her life story from being a poor child vendor in the Philippines to succeeding as an immigrant in Canada. Following the launch of her book, van Ruyven was recognized by People Asia Magazine as one of the awardees of the 2005 People of the Year in the Philippines and won an Honorable Mention for Best Non-Fiction Book at the Independent Publisher Award in Western Canada.

== Early life ==
Van Ruyven was born in a rural village in Pader, Batangas, Philippines, to a family of 12 siblings. Her father was a family driver and her mother was a vendor. To earn extra money to help her parents, van Ruyven had to spend her childhood selling food and merchandise after going to school. She sold mangoes, rice cakes, fish, vegetables, and candies in her neighborhood and at the popular tourist spot Matabungkay Beach in Batangas.

She was sent to college on scholarship by a priest. After finishing a medical secretarial course, van Ruyven was employed in a local hospital in Manila. She then moved on to work overseas, as an executive secretary in a hospital in Yemen where she met her husband, Ted van Ruyven, an aviation engineer.

== Life as an immigrant ==
After her marriage in 1987, van Ruyven immigrated to Vancouver, British Columbia, Canada, with her husband. They had two daughters, Michelle and Catherine. As a stay-at-home mother, van Ruyven accepted typing jobs and provided computer tutorial lessons to neighbors. She then accepted a job at Discovery Toys as a sales executive.

In 1994, van Ruyven set-up her own print business, Digi-Print Graphics Plus in Surrey, British Columbia, Canada. Due to the success of her business, she was nominated as Business Woman of the Year in South Surrey in 1996.

== Self-publishing and current work ==
After attending one of Chicken Soup for the Soul author Mark Victor Hansen's personal development seminars in 2004, van Ruyven was encouraged to write her life story. Through her publishing company, she was able to print and sell her book, which became a best-seller in the Philippines. The success of her book made her an in-demand motivational speaker in the Philippines, Singapore, Japan, and Canada.

In 2009, van Ruyven was diagnosed with ovarian cancer. Bouncing back to health, van Ruyven now plans to write a second book that will outline simple and practical strategies for success. She currently resides in White Rock, Surrey, British Columbia, with her family.
