= Erik Mana =

Filipino musician

Erik Mana (born September 16, 1972) is a professional magician and mentalist.

Mana was born in Manila and raised in Toronto, Ontario, Canada. He is best known for his three television specials Stranger, Mastermind and Believe, which aired on a local and international Filipino channel.
