= Herbert Gaisano =

Canadian physician and researcher (born 1956)

- Born: Herbert Young Gaisano; December 28, 1956 (age 69); Cebu City, Philippines
- Education: University of the Philippines, Mayo Clinic
- Known for: Research in diabetes and pancreatitis
- Awards: Order of Ontario (2016); Canada Research Chair (Tier 1); Fellow of the Canadian Academy of Health Sciences; Queen Elizabeth II Diamond Jubilee Medal
- Scientific career
- Fields: Internal medicine, Gastroenterology
- Workplaces: University of Toronto, University Health Network

Herbert Young Gaisano is a Filipino-Canadian physician-scientist, gastroenterologist, and cell biologist known for his research on diabetes and pancreatic diseases. He is a professor in the Departments of Medicine and Physiology at the University of Toronto and a senior scientist at the Toronto General Hospital Research Institute and the Krembil Research Institute.

== Early life and education ==
Gaisano was born in Cebu City, Philippines, to John Sy Gaisano, Sr. and Helen Lee Young, members of a prominent Filipino-Chinese business family. He graduated magna cum laude in pre-medicine from the University of the Philippines (UP) in 1977 and earned his MD from the UP College of Medicine in 1981. He completed his internship at the Philippine General Hospital before pursuing residency in internal medicine at the Mayo Clinic in Minnesota.

== Career ==
In 1991, Gaisano began independent medical practice in Ontario, joining the Toronto Western Hospital and the University of Toronto’s Faculty of Medicine. He became UHN’s Research Director (1996–2003), and was promoted to professor in 2004. He co-founded the Centre for Islet Research and Therapeutics at Toronto General Hospital in 2015 and has served as co-director of the Diet, Digestive tract & Disease (3D) Facility.

Gaisano’s research focuses on secretory dysfunction in diabetes and pancreatitis, including insulin exocytosis and ion channel regulation. He has over 100 peer-reviewed publications and holds patents on molecular targets for diabetes treatment.

== Honours ==
Gaisano was appointed to the Order of Ontario in 2015. He is a Fellow of the Royal College of Physicians and Surgeons of Canada, the Canadian Academy of Health Sciences, and the American College of Physicians. Gaisano was awarded the Queen Elizabeth II Diamond Jubilee Medal
