= Pura Velasco =

- Born: Philippines
- Occupation: activist

Pura Velasco is a Philippine-born activist and advocate for caregivers based in Canada.

Pura M. Velasco was a student activist in the University of the Philippines.

After her arrival in Toronto in 1989 from Vienna, where she was a migrant caregiver, Velasco took on the cause of her Filipina compatriots in Canada. In 1991, she began to work as a facilitator for the organization Intercede for the Right of Domestic Workers, Caregivers, Nannies and Newcomers or INTERCEDE. She was a member of Instrac (Institute for Training and Accreditation of Foreign Professional Graduates) and the Multicultural Committee at Mid-Toronto Community Services.

She helped organize Migrante Women's Collective (MWC). Formerly known as the Coalition for the Defense of Migrant Workers' Rights, this organization evolved from a group of organizations such as the United Filipino Mothers, Caregivers' Cooperative, Katipunan ng Manggagawang Kababaihan, and others. She also served as on the board of the Community Alliance for Social Justice.

In 2007, Velasco founded Caregivers Action Centre, previously known as the Caregivers Support Services, with which she served as spokesperson, advocating and lobbying for fair employment, immigration status, and access to settlement services.”

== Awards ==
- 1993 Skills for Change New Pioneer Award
- 2010 Bromley Armstrong Award
- 2016 J.S. Woodsworth Lifetime Achievement Award

== Selected publications ==
- ‘We Can Still Fight Back’: Organizing Domestic Workers in Toronto, in "Not One of the Family" Eds. Abigail B. Bakan, Daiva Stasiulis. pp 157-164. University of Toronto Press, 1997. https://doi.org/10.3138/9781442677944-009
- Filipino Migrant Workers Amidst Globalization in "Canadian Woman Studies" 21.4-22.1 (2002): 131-35.
- Respect and Dignity for Caregivers. Speech delivered at the Almusalan Forum of the Philippine Press Club Ontario. Toronto, February 23, 2008.
