= Narima dela Cruz =

Narima Dela Cruz
- Born: Quezon, Philippines
- Occupations: Realtor, Interpreter, Community Leader, Politician
- Spouse: Eng'r. Joel Dela Cruz
- Children: Daryl Dela Cruz Glisha
- Parent(s): Conrado & Perla Arguelles

Narima Dela Cruz is a prominent Filipino Canadian community leader, community activist, Canadian Realtor, Language Interpreter, politician, and with multiple awards which include 2012 Top 25 Canadian Immigrants Award, Queen's Platinum Jubilee Medal and King Charles Coronation Medal Award.

== Philippines to Canada ==
Born in Quezon, Philippines, Dela Cruz came to Winnipeg, Manitoba in 1998 with her husband and young son where they resided for seven years. Her education and professional background in the Philippines revolved around tourism, education, office administration and law. Adding another child to the family they moved to Surrey, a city in British Columbia within the Metro Vancouver area. She has been a Licensed Realtor since 2006 and a Language Interpreter and Translator since 2013.

== Recognitions as a Community Volunteer ==
As Founder of the Surrey Philippine Independence Day Society (SPIDS), an organization of Filipino Canadians in the city of Surrey, and a very active community volunteer, Dela Cruz was honoured by a Vancouver and Toronto newspaper and website as one of Canada's top 25 immigrants in 2012. She was also presented the Realtors Care Award from the Real Estate Board of Greater Vancouver in 2011 for her volunteer activity and philanthropic acts. Through the years, she has volunteered with various mainstream Canadian organizations which include Canadian Red Cross, Canadian Cancer Society of B.C., S.U.C.C.E.S.S., Options Community Service Society, SD36, Surrey Food Bank, Canadian Blood Services, Surrey Food Bank, and BC Transplant Society. Among other mainstream recognition and nominations she was given are from Surrey Leader Newspaper in 2011, Surrey Board of Trade in 2011, Surrey Cares Foundation in 2016 & 2019, YWCA Vancouver in 2018, City of Surrey in 2020, and the federal government in 2017 for the Canada 150 Community Awards for Excellence in Volunteerism. In 2019, she won among 5 contenders all over Canada the Pinoy (Filipino) of the Year honours of the national Golden Balangay Awards.

== Surrey Civic Election 2014 ==
Ms. Dela Cruz run for Councilor for the City of Surrey under the party One Surrey with mayoral candidate Barinder Rasode. She is the first Filipino-Canadian woman to run for public office in the City of Surrey. She earned 18, 075 votes. The entire Surrey First Slate of Mayoral Candidate Linda Hepner were elected.

== Surrey Civic Election 2018 ==
Ms. Dela Cruz once again run for Councilor for the City of Surrey, this time under the administration party Surrey First with mayoral candidate Tom Gill. She earned 23, 790 votes. Aside from one winner from Surrey First, the other elected council members, including the mayor, are from the Safe Surrey Coalition

== Filipino Canadian National Congress - Founding President ==
After years of advocating for issues concerning Filipino Canadians and contributing to the campaign for the official declaration of June as 'Filipino Heritage Month in Canada in 2018, Dela Cruz emerges as a Founding Director and the pioneer President of the Filipino Canadian National Congress (FCNC), a registered national non profit organization representing the nearly one million Filipino Canadians, and the first and only Filipino organization directly affiliated with the Canada Philippines Parliamentary Friendship Group of Canada's House of Commons.
