= Esteban Comilang =

Filipino-Canadian actor

Esteban Comilang is a Filipino Canadian actor from Toronto, Ontario. He is most noted for his performance as Reynaldo in the 2021 film Islands, for which he received a Canadian Screen Award nomination for Best Supporting Actor at the 10th Canadian Screen Awards in 2022.
