= Emilio Binavince =

Filipino-Canadian lawyer and legal scholar

- Born: April 2, 1935 (age 90); Rosales, Pangasinan, Philippines
- Occupations: Lawyer, academic
- Known for: First Filipino called to the bar in Ontario and Saskatchewan

Emilio Binavince (born April 2, 1935) is a Filipino-Canadian lawyer and legal scholar. He was the first person of Filipino descent to be called to the bars of Ontario (1971) and Saskatchewan (1986).

== Early life and education ==
Binavince was born in Rosales, Pangasinan, Philippines. He completed a Bachelor of Arts in 1954 and a Bachelor of Laws in 1957 at Manuel L. Quezon University. In 1958, he was admitted to the Philippine bar. As a Fulbright scholar, he earned a Master of Comparative Law from Tulane University and an LL.M. from Harvard Law School in 1962. He later received a Humboldt Fellowship and completed legal studies at the University of Bonn in Germany.

== Academic career ==
In 1965, Binavince joined the Faculty of Law at the University of Ottawa, where he founded the Ottawa Law Review in 1966 and served as its first faculty editor. He played a key role in establishing the university's Joint LL.B./M.B.A. Program and co-directed the graduate law program. He was appointed full professor in 1970 and was a visiting professor at New York University in 1972. He remained at the University of Ottawa until 1986.

== Legal career ==
Binavince practiced law with Gowling & Henderson, later joining Cogan & Cogan in Ottawa. He eventually opened his own practice, representing clients including governments, corporations, individuals, and advocacy groups such as Amnesty International and the Minority Advocacy and Rights Council. He appeared before all levels of the Canadian judiciary, including the Supreme Court. In 1986, he was appointed to the Philippine Presidential Commission on Good Government.

== Personal life ==
Binavince married Brigitte Neugebauer, whom he met during his research fellowship in Germany. They have three children, all of whom became lawyers.

== Awards and honours ==
- Banaag Award, Commission on Filipinos Overseas (1991)
- Queen Elizabeth II Golden Jubilee Medal (2002)
