= Rebecca Rivera =

Filipino-Canadian volleyball player (born 1995)

Personal information
- Nickname: Becca
- Nationality: Filipino-Canadian
- Born: 12 May 1995 (age 31)
- Hometown: Mississauga, Ontario, Canada
- Height: 5 ft 7 in (1.70 m)
- Education: University of Connecticut

Volleyball information
- Position: Setter
- Current club: Petron Blaze Spikers

Rebecca Rivera (born May 12, 1995) is a Filipino-Canadian volleyball athlete and plays as a setter.

== Career ==
She is the primary setter for the UConn Huskies. She appeared for 29 games in her first season for the Huskies. Rivera played with Sta. Lucia Lady Realtors for the 2017 PSL All-Filipino Conference season.

== Personal life ==
Rebecca grew up in Mississauga, Ontario with her parents Leo and Myra Rivera. She has a brother Brandon-Sage and a sister Amanda Leigh. She is a close relative of Filipino actor Ariel Rivera.

== Clubs ==
- (Philippines) Sta. Lucia Lady Realtors (2017—2019)
- (Philippines) Petron Blaze Spikers (2020—present)
