= Rogelio Balagtas =

Filipino-Canadian actor

Rogelio Balagtas is a Filipino Canadian actor from Winnipeg, Manitoba. He is most noted for his performance as Joshua in the 2021 film Islands, for which he received a Canadian Screen Award nomination for Best Actor at the 10th Canadian Screen Awards in 2022.

Islands was Balagtas' first-ever leading role in a feature film; his only prior acting experience was in the 2019 short film Piece of Mind. In his review of the film, Barry Hertz of The Globe and Mail praised Balagtas's performance, writing that "Joshua’s richness as a character, though, may have delivered less of an impact if not for Balagtas. With just a short film to his name prior to joining Islands, the Winnipeg actor delivers an honest, stripped-down performance so real that it seems lifted from a documentary. Of course, the actor’s virtual anonymity helps, but there is a deliberate, professional control to Balagtas’ work here that bears the hallmark of a gifted actor."

He also won the Special Jury Prize for Breakthrough Performance at the 2021 SXSW Film Festival.
