= Virginia Guiang =

Filipino-Canadian librarian and activist

Virginia Guiang-Santoro
- Born: Virginia Gonzales Guiang; December 18, 1940 (age 84); Bambang, Nueva Vizcaya, Philippines
- Occupation(s): Librarian, social activist
- Known for: Founding the Filipino Domestic Workers Association of Manitoba
- Awards: Order of Manitoba (2004)

Virginia Guiang-Santoro OM (born 18 December 1940) is a former librarian and social activist based in Manitoba, Canada. She is best known as the founder and adviser of the Filipino Domestic Workers Association of Manitoba, a volunteer group advocating for the rights of caregivers in the province.

== Early years ==
Virginia Guiang was born in Bambang, Nueva Vizcaya, Philippines, the daughter of Eustaquio Brela Guiang and Teodora Gonzales. One of ten children, she was raised in Nueva Ecija.

She graduated from St. Catherine’s High School in 1956 and later earned a degree in education from the University of Santo Tomas in Manila. She taught at St. Theresa’s High School in Baguio before immigrating to Canada.

== Immigration and career ==
Guiang immigrated to Canada in 1969 after visiting family in Belgium, where she was redirected to Canada following an unsuccessful attempt to obtain a U.S. visa. She began work at the University of Manitoba’s Elizabeth Dafoe Library, where she served for over 25 years, retiring in 1999 as head of the shelving unit.

== Community involvement ==
Guiang co-founded a Filipino dance troupe in 1970, which evolved into the Kayumanggi Philippine Performing Arts group, performing at Folklorama for eight years. She served on the Folk Arts Council of Winnipeg and was active in the Queens and Mayors initiative.

She helped form the Immigrant Women’s Association of Manitoba in 1983 and served as secretary of the Cosmopolitan Club in 1972.

As president of the Philippine Association of Manitoba (1988–1991), she led disaster-relief fundraising and initiated the move to a new community centre, now the Philippine Canadian Centre of Manitoba (PCCM). In 2004, she became PCCM’s executive director.

== Advocacy ==
Guiang attended the founding conference of the National Organization of Immigrant and Visible Minority Women of Canada in 1986 and served as one of two Manitoba representatives until 1988.

On 24 April 1988, she co-founded the Filipino Domestic Workers Association of Manitoba (FIDWAM), affiliated with the Philippine Association of Manitoba and the Philippine Heritage Council of Manitoba. She served as the group's adviser.

She also served on Winnipeg’s Community Race Relations Committee in 1986 and helped found the Coalition of Filipino Canadians on Violence Prevention in 1995. In 2003, she was appointed to the board of the Canadian Race Relations Foundation.

== Honours ==
- Award of Recognition, Philippine Association of Manitoba (1992)
- Award of Distinction, City of Winnipeg (1994)
- Citation for Canadian Citizenship (1996)
- YW-YMCA Women of Distinction Award (1997)
- Women on the Move, Winnipeg Sun (2000)
- Queen Elizabeth II's Golden Jubilee Medal (2002)
- Order of Manitoba (2004)
- Most Outstanding Alumna, St. Joseph's College, Quezon City (2005)
- Top 25 Canadian Immigrant (2020)
