= Ruben Cusipag =

Filipino-Canadian journalist

- Born: July 12, 1938; Philippines
- Died: July 9, 2013 (aged 74); Markham, Canada
- Occupation: journalist

Ruben Cusipag (July 12, 1938 - July 9, 2013) was a journalist and social activist. He was a pioneer in Filipino-Canadian journalism having established several community newspapers in Ontario in the 1970s. He was the founding editor of Atin Ito, one of Canada's oldest Filipino newspapers and founder of Toronto-based newspaper Balita.

== Biography ==
Ruben Javier Cusipag was born to Salvador Cusipag Sr. and Nenita Javier in Paco, Manila. He studied in Araullo High School (now Manila High School) where he became editor-in-chief of the school publication in his senior year. He graduated from the University of the Philippines with a Bachelor of Arts, major in English. He became a reporter for several newspapers, notably The Evening News of the Manila Broadcasting Company (MBC). He was one of the first media workers to be arrested and imprisoned when President Ferdinand Marcos declared martial law in the Philippines.

Due to the political suppression, he left for Canada in 1974 together with his family. He worked as an editor with community newspapers including Newfoundland Signal and Toronto-based Philippine Tribune. He also became a foreign correspondent for Bulletin Today (now Manila Bulletin).

In 1976, he co-founded the newspaper Atin Ito where he became its first editor. In 1978, he independently launched another newspaper Balita becoming its founding publisher and editor producing articles that are critical of the Marcos dictatorship. In October 1993, his book, Portrait of Filipino Canadians in Ontario (1960-1990), came off the press. Partly funded by the Ontario Ministry of Citizenship and Culture, the book was sponsored by the Kababayan Community Centre, which he also co-founded.

He died on July 9, 2013, at Markham Stouffville Hospital.

== Selected publications ==
- Democracy in the Philippines. Downsview, Ontario: R. Cusipag (ed.), 1976
- Portrait of Filipino Canadians in Ontario (1960-1990). Toronto: Kalayaan Media Limited, 1993.
- The Philippines, Drawing Closer to a Turning Point. University of Toronto-York University Joint Centre on Modern East Asia, 1986

== See also ==
- Journalism during the Marcos dictatorship
- Coalition Against the Marcos Dictatorship
- Filipino community in Toronto
