= Bad Boy Club Montréal =

Charity based in Quebec, Canada

Bad Boy Club Montréal, also known as BBCM or Fondation BBCM, is a charitable organization established in 1991, based in Montreal, Quebec, Canada. The foundation organizes events for international audiences to generate funds for charitable causes such as HIV/AIDS charities, financial aid, and medical/social services to persons suffering from HIV/AIDS in Montreal. BBCM donates a portion of its proceeds in support of activities of LGBT community groups.

These activities are a celebration of lifestyle and culture of the gay community. Black & Blue Festival is the biggest of the five annual events that BBCM organizes.

== Establishment and progress ==
The first year event, named Black & Blue, attracted 800 people. Through the years, this event has grown and attracted a global following with an average of 60,000 to 75,000 participants. Fondation BBCM has donated over $1,400,000 to different charities.

== Annual events ==
BBCM organizes 5 annual events as follows:

Event	Duration	Coinciding with	Month
"Le Bal des boys"	Week-end party	New Year	end of December
"Red"	Week-end party	Valentine's Day	mid February
"Hot & Dry"	Week-end party	Victoria Day (Fête de la reine) / National Patriots' Day (Journée nationale des patriotes)	May
"tWist"	Week-end party	During Divers/Cité (1993-2014) Montreal Pride Week	August
"Black and Blue Festiva" (or FestiVal Black & Blue)	Full week	Canadian Thanksgiving (Action de grâce)/ Columbus Day	October
