= Filipino community in Toronto =

Filipino Canadians in Toronto
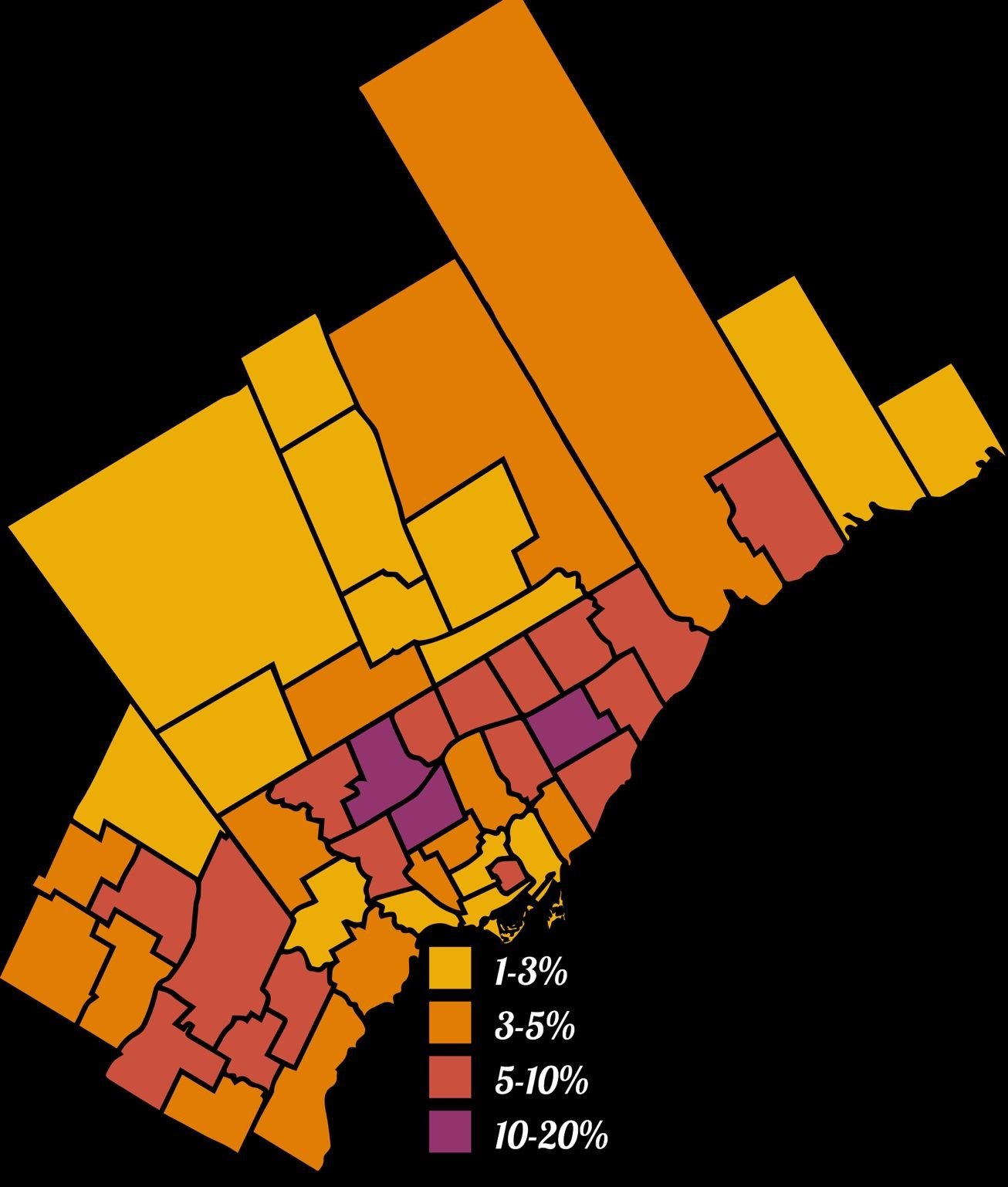
- Population distribution of Filipino Canadians in the Greater Toronto Area by federal electoral district, 2021 census

The Filipino community in Toronto comprises 62% of the Filipino population in Canada. In 2007, 140 000 Filipinos lived in Toronto, accounting for 3% of Toronto’s overall population. According to the study conducted in 2001, 57% of the Filipino community were female.

== History ==
In 2001, 98% of Canadians of Filipino origin were born in the Philippines. Most immigrants of Filipino origin arrived in the past twenty years. In 2001, 53% of Filipino immigrants arrived in Canada between 1991 and 2000, and another 24% arrived between 1981 and 1990. However, only 4% arrived in the 1960s, and less than 1% came to Canada before 1961.

== Demographics ==
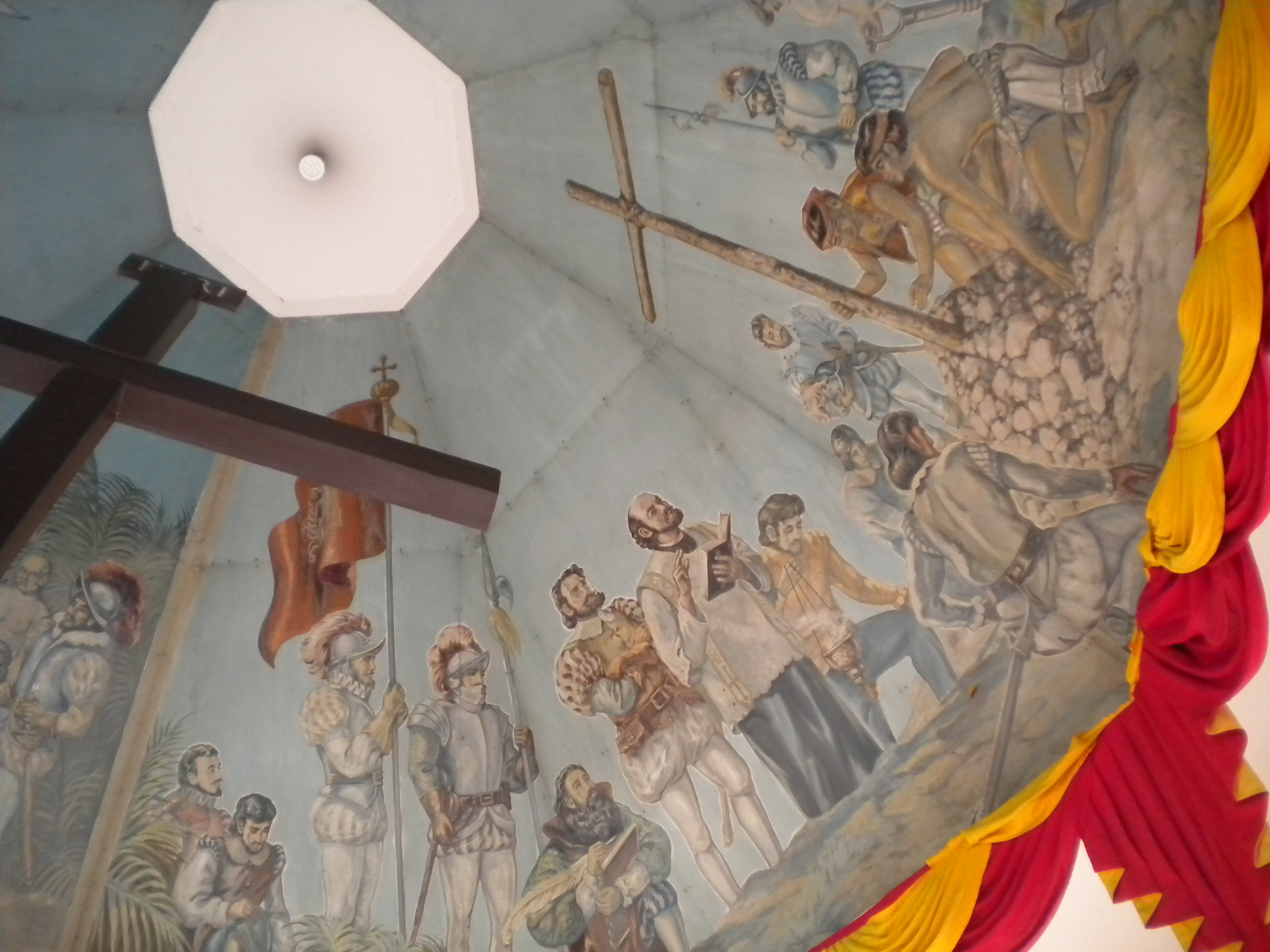
Basilica del Santo Niño, which is considered the Mother and Head of All Churches in the Philippines.

=== Age ===
People of Filipino origin are more likely than Canada's population to be either children or employed young adults, while Filipino Canadians are less likely to be retirees or seniors.

=== Educational attainment ===
Filipino-born Canadians are more likely to hold a university degree than the general population. In 2001, 31% of Canadians of Filipino heritage aged 15 and up held a bachelor's or postgraduate degree. Filipino-born Canadians with post-secondary qualifications likely hold degrees in highly technical fields. In 2001, people of Filipino origin accounted for 2% of university graduates in Canada. In 2001, studies showed that 33% of women of Filipino origin had a university degree, compared to 27% of their male counterparts.

=== Employment ===
Most Canadians of Filipino origin are employed. In 2001, 72% of labor force participants of Filipino origin were employed. In the Filipino population, more men than women work outside the home, constituting a high proportion of all those employed in both healthcare and manufacturing. However, their representation was disproportionately low in management, education, politics, and the social sciences fields.

=== Family status ===
In 2001, 51% of adults in the Filipino community had marriage status. Canadians of Filipino origin are just as likely as the rest of the population to have single-parent status. In 2001, 6% of adults of Filipino origin aged 15 and over were single parents; most of which were women. In the Filipino community, women represented 88% of all single parents in 2001.

=== Religious affiliation ===
Most Canadians of Filipino origin are Christians. In 2001, 81% claimed they were Catholic, while 15% belonged to either a mainline Protestant denomination or another Christian grouping. However, a relatively small proportion of the Filipino community, 3%, reported they had no religious affiliation.

== Institutional support ==
=== Toronto Public Library ===
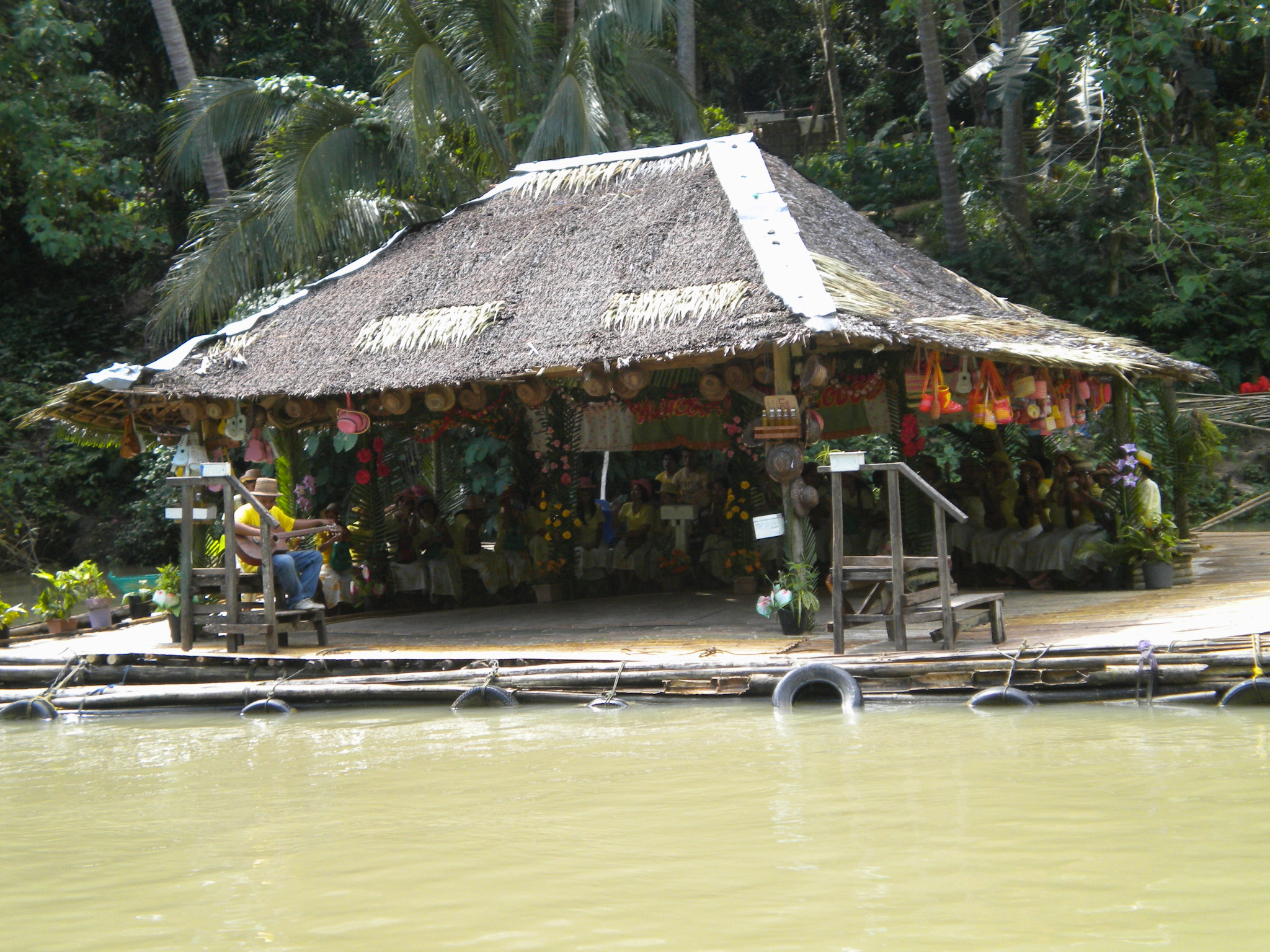
Traditional Philippine music and dance.

Previous censuses reveal that Filipinos in Toronto speak Tagalog more frequently than any other Philippine language, hence Tagalog has precedence on the Toronto Public Library's shelves. Though Filipinos are Toronto's fourth largest visible minority population (2008), TPL's Tagalog items totaled less than 7000, accounting for less than 1% of the library's total multilingual collection in 2006. In 2009, TPL had eight branches with Tagalog collections across Toronto with its larger Tagalog collections at Malvern and Barbara Frum branches found in Tagalog-speaking Filipino neighborhoods. Based on physical examination of shelves and anecdotal evidence provided by staff at TPL branches with Tagalog collections, Tagalog paperbacks and melodramatic movies are borrowed more often than award-winning novels and films. Tagalog shows, particularly teleseryes, dominate the Filipino-Canadian household today, but Hollywood movies are much more popular than locally produced ones. Concerning Philippine music, Filipino singers are just as likely to perform Tagalog songs as English ones, and the titles of the songs they sing in concerts, on TV, on CDs, and streaming services reflect this reality. There is a significant demand for Tagalog material, though Filipinos who most often speak Tagalog at home are not as many as the English-speaking ones. However, Tagalog is not the language spoken or read by most Filipinos. This is the case for 63% of Filipinos in Toronto who speak English at home. The Philippines has 8 major languages and almost 500 dialects, but the language in mass media is limited to English and Tagalog.

=== Filipino Centre Toronto ===
The Toronto Philippine Consulate founded the Filipino Centre. This centre is the meeting place for many Filipinos. A library containing multiple Tagalog collections was their recent establishment. The centre’s free medical clinic aids newcomers to Toronto, while its homework club for students caters to Filipino youth. A Tagalog class us open to Filipino children and Canadians who have interest in learning the language. Guest speakers from Basilica del Santo Niño often visit. The Filipino Singing Idol Contest showcases traditional Filipino music from the Spanish Era, while dance classes are available. The centre offers exercise programs for seniors.

=== Kababayan Multicultural Centre ===
The Kababayan Multicultural Centre is a non-profit agency providing settlement services for Filipino newcomers to Toronto. The settlement program is funded by the three levels of the Canadian government: Federal, Province of Ontario and City of Toronto. Its mission is to support newcomer immigrants by providing settlement services, assisting the job application process, and addressing social barriers. Services are offered in English and Tagalog.

== Status ==
Tagalog is one of the fastest-growing languages in Canada. In the period 2006-2011, Canadians who consider Tagalog their first language at home increased by 64%. Most Canadians of Filipino origin can converse in one of Canada's official languages. In 2001, 99% said they could converse in one or both official languages, while 1% reported they could speak neither English nor French. Most, 93%, could carry on a conversation in English only, while 6% could converse in both English and French and below 1% spoke French only. In 2001, 59% of the Filipino community said that their mother tongue was a non-official language, while 41% said that their mother tongue was English and 1% said that it was French. 60% of the Filipino community considered Tagalog their mother tongue.

=== Greater Toronto Area ===
According to the 2011 census, over 70 000 people in Toronto list Tagalog as their mother tongue. Tagalog is in the top 20 mother tongues listed in Toronto's 140 neighbourhoods. In 22 of those neighbourhoods, over 1000 people list it as their mother tongue. Tagalog mother tongue speakers are largely concentrated in areas such as Scarborough and North York.

=== Relations with Canada ===
According to the Ethnic Diversity Survey of the 2006 Canadian census, most Canadians of Filipino origin feel a strong attachment to Canada. In 2002, 78% of those who reported Filipino origin claimed they had a strong attachment to Canada. At the same time, 89% claimed they had a strong attachment to their ethnic or cultural group. Canadians of Filipino origin are active in Canadian society. In 2002, 73% of eligible voters reported doing so in the 2000 federal election. Also, 41% reported that they participated in an organization such as a sports team or community association. However, one-third of Canadians of Filipino origin reported unfair treatment towards their race, language or accent. Majority (64%) of those who experienced discrimination reported a lack of employment equity due to their race or skin colour, and 69% claimed discrimination occurred in the workplace or job application.
